= 2025 FAMAS Awards =

73rd FAMAS Awards

73rd FAMAS Awards
- Date: August 22, 2025
- Site: Manila Hotel, Manila
- Hosted by: R.S. Francisco, Sam Verzosa, Max Eigenmann and Tessa Prieto-Valdes

Highlights
- Best Picture: Alipato at Muog
- Most awards: Mamay: A Journey to Greatness (4)
- Most nominations: Green Bones (10), Mamay: A Journey to Greatness (10), Topakk (10)

The 73rd Filipino Academy of Movie Arts and Sciences (FAMAS) Awards has taken place on August 22, 2025, at the Fiesta Pavilion of Manila Hotel in Manila, Philippines. It honors the best Filipino films released in 2024.

Alipato at Muog, a documentary about the disappearance of activist Jonas Burgos, won Best Picture and Best Director awards. It is only the second documentary film to be conferred the Best Picture prize in the history of FAMAS Awards, following Aswang in 2020.

== Winners and nominees ==
A separate awards ceremony was held on May 10, 2025 for short-form films.

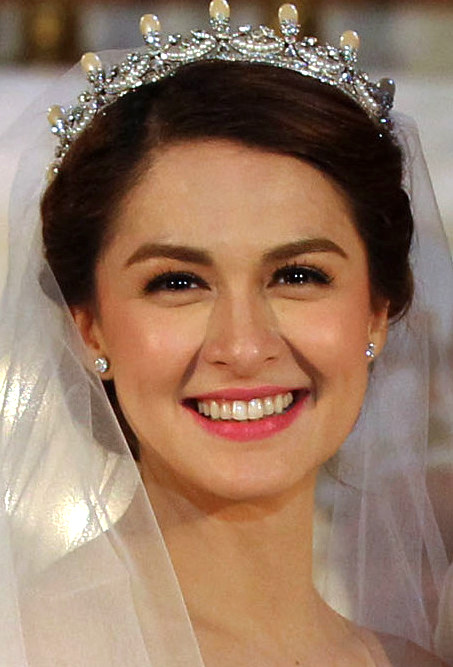
Four-time FAMAS nominee Marian Rivera wins the Best Actress award for her role as a teacher in charge of a ballot box in Kip Oebanda's Balota.

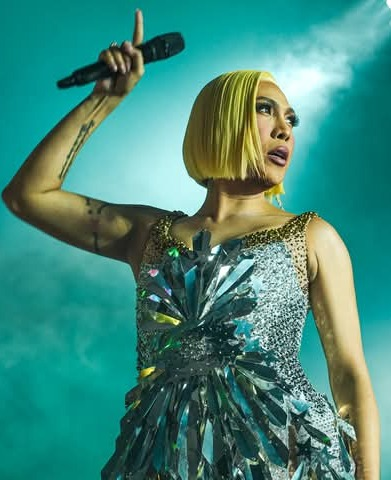
Vice Ganda ties for the Best Actor prize on his first nomination as Overseas Filipino Worker (OFW), Bambi Salvador, on Jun Lana's dramedy, And the Breadwinner Is...

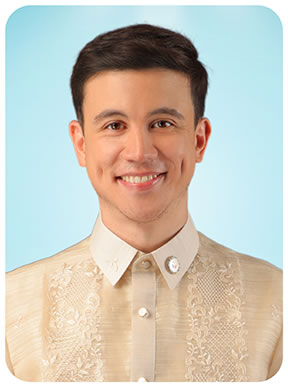
Arjo Atayde ties for the Best Actor award on his first nomination as an ex-special forces operative suffering from PTSD in Richard V. Somes' Topakk.

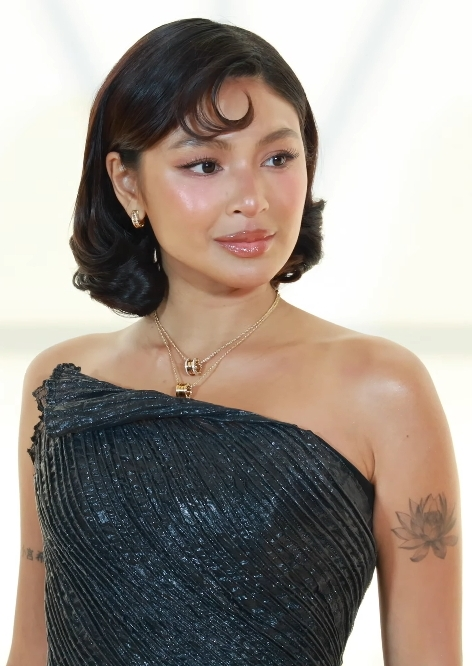
Nadine Lustre wins the Best Supporting Actress award for the first time for her portrayal of a billionaire's feisty rebellious daughter in Uninvited. She has previously won the Best Actress award for Never Not Love You (2018) and Greed (2022).

=== Awards ===
Winners are listed first, highlighted in boldface.

**Best Picture**: **Alipato at Muog**; And the Breadwinner Is...; Balota; Green Bones; Mamay: A Journey to Greatness; The Hearing; Topakk; Under a Piaya Moon; Uninvited; When Magic Hurts	**Best Director**: **JL Burgos – Alipato at Muog**; Chito S. Roño – Espantaho; Dan Villegas – Uninvited; Gabby Ramos – When Magic Hurts; Jun Lana – And the Breadwinner Is...; Kurt Soberano – Under a Piaya Moon; Lawrence Fajardo – The Hearing; Neal "Buboy" Tan – Mamay: A Journey to Greatness; Richard Somes – Topakk; Zig Dulay – Green Bones
**Best Actor**: **Arjo Atayde – Topakk as Miguel Vergara**; **Vice Ganda – And the Breadwinner Is... as Bambi Salvador**; Aga Muhlach – Uninvited as Guilly Vega; Alden Richards – Hello, Love, Again as Ethan del Rosario; Dennis Trillo – Green Bones as Domingo Zamora; Kelvin Miranda – Chances Are You and I as Soleil "Sol" Sikat	**Best Actress**: **Marian Rivera – Balota as Emmy**; Ara Mina – Mamay: A Journey to Greatness as Hadja Alianur Mamay; Judy Ann Santos – Espantaho as Monet; Julia Montes – Topakk as Weng Diwata; Kathryn Bernardo – Hello, Love, Again as Joy Marie Fabregas-del Rosario; Rebecca Chuaunsu – Her Locket as Jewel Ouyang
**Best Supporting Actor**: **Jeric Raval – Mamay: A Journey to Greatness as Mayor Marcos Mamay**; Jhong Hilario – And the Breadwinner Is... as Biboy Salvador; Joel Torre – Under a Piaya Moon as Leopoldo "Lolo Poldo" Infante; Ruru Madrid – Green Bones as Xavier Gonzaga; Sid Lucero – Topakk as Romero; Will Ashley – Balota as Enzo	**Best Supporting Actress**: **Nadine Lustre – Uninvited as Nicolette Chantal "Nicole" Remegio Vega**; Alessandra de Rossi – Green Bones as Betty; Claudine Barretto – When Magic Hurts; Eugene Domingo – And the Breadwinner Is... as Baby Salvador; Isabelle Sophie Ng – Her Locket as young Jewel Ouyang; Mylene Dizon – The Hearing as Madonna
**Best Screenplay**: **Ricky Lee and Angeli Atienza – Green Bones**; Alipato at Muog; Balota; Mamay: A Journey to Greatness; The Hearing; Under the Piaya Moon	**Best Cinematography**: **Mamay: A Journey to Greatness**; And the Breadwinner Is...; Kalakal; Topakk; Uninvited; When Magic Hurts
**Best Visual Effects**: **Espantaho**; Alipato at Muog; Green Bones; Topakk	**Best Editing**: **The Hearing**; Alipato at Muog; Green Bones; Hello, Love, Again; Topakk; Under a Piaya Moon
**Best Production Design**: **Mamay: A Journey to Greatness**; Espantaho; Hello, Love, Again; Topakk; Under a Piaya Moon; When Magic Hurts	**Best Sound**: **Topakk**; Alipato at Muog; And the Breadwinner Is...; Green Bones; Mamay: A Journey to Greatness; Uninvited
**Best Song (Theme Song)**: **"Hamon" – Mamay: A Journey to Greatness**; **"Hahamakin ang Lahat" – Uninvited**; "Paruparo" – When Magic Hurts; "Sa Likod ng Tagumpay" – Idol	**Best Musical Score**: **Mamay: A Journey to Greatness**; And the Breadwinner Is...; Green Bones; Hello, Love, Again; Uninvited; When Magic Hurts

== FAMAS Short Film Festival winners ==
List of winners in the first ever FAMAS Short Film Festival.

Category	Title	Awardee
Best Student Film	Kiyaw	Jericho Jeriel Bassig
Best Documentary Film	No Man Left Behind	Ella Mage and Emir Kahn Bautista
Best Advocacy Film	Benepisyo	Angelito J. De Guzman
Best Advocacy Film	Hello, Mr. Jenkins	Gian Arre and Flo Reyes
Best Child Performer/Actor	Earl Quintana (Parapo)	Jhonn Bobier
Best Actress	Mina Cruz (As The Moth Flies)	Gayle Oblea
Best Actor	Soliman Cruz (Ang Huling Liham)	Miguel Potestades
Best Production Design	Harley Alcasid (One Day, Three Autumns)	Bridget Rabo Ng-Ting
Best Music & Sound Design	Glemuel Rigo and Junelle Tecson (Kiyaw)	Jericho Jeriel Bassig
Best Editing	Gayle Oblea and Noah del Rosario (As The Moth Flies)	Gayle Oblea
Best Cinematography	Jhonn Bobier, Lance Allen, and Justine Mark Uy (Parapo)	Jhonn Bobier
Best Screenplay	Kita Mo ‘To?	Adam Dominic Dumaguin
Best Director	Parapo	Jhonn Bobier
Best Picture	As The Moth Flies	Gayle Oblea

== Honorary Awards ==
The following were the other special honorary awards.

- Film Producer of the Year – Mentorque, Inc.
- Bida sa Takilya Award – Kathryn Bernardo
- FAMAS Circle of Excellence Award – Vilma Santos
- FAMAS Child Icon of Philippine Cinema – Judy Ann Santos, Gladys Reyes, Ian Veneracion, Ice Seguerra, Niño Muhlach, Matet de Leon
- German Moreno Youth Achievement Award – Andres and Atasha Muhlach
- Susan Roces Celebrity Award – Lorna Tolentino
- Nora Aunor Superstar Award – Judy Ann Santos
- FPJ Memorial Bida Award – Manny Pacquiao
- FPJ Memorial Kontrabida Award – Dindo Arroyo
- Dr. Jose Perez Memorial Award for Journalism – PEP.ph
- FAMAS Presidential Award – Marcos Mamay
- FAMAS Loyalty Award – Brian Lu
