= 48th Gawad Urian Awards =

Award ceremony for Philippine films of 2024

- Date: October 11, 2025
- Site: Teresa Yuchengco Auditorium, De La Salle University, Manila, Philippines

Highlights
- Best Picture: Alipato at Muog
- Most awards: Tumandok (4)
- Most nominations: Tumandok (11)

The 48th Gawad Urian Awards (Filipino: Ika-48 na Gawad Urian) was held on October 11, 2025 at the De La Salle University. Established in 1976, the Gawad Urian Awards highlights the best of Philippine cinema as decided by the Filipino Film Critics. The nominations for most categories are announced on September 5 both at the organization's official website and its official Facebook page. The nominees for Best Documentary and Best Short Film are going to be announced in the last week of September. Leading the pack with eleven nominations is Tumandok, a film from the husband-and-wife team of Arlie Sumagaysay and Richard Salvadico. The film tackles the struggles of the Ati people of Panay.

Notably, Felipe Ganancial wins a posthumous Best Supporting Actor title for his role as an elder and chieftain in Tumandok. Ganancial has died on May 13, 2025.

== Winners and nominees ==
Winners are listed first and bolded.

Best Picture Pinakamahusay na Pelikula	Best Director Pinakamahusay na Direksyon
**Alipato at Muog – Pulang Langgam Media Productions**; Green Bones – GMA Pictures, GMA Public Affairs, Brightburn Entertainment; Kono Basho – Cinemalaya Foundation Inc., Project 8 Projects, Mentorque Productions; Phantosmia – Black Cap Pictures, TEN17P, Sine Olivia Pilipinas; Rizal's Makamisa: Pantasma ng Higanti – Kamias Overground, Rapid Eye Movies; The Hearing – Pelikulaw, Center Stage Productions; Tumandok – Southern Lantern Studios, Terminal Six Post, Cinemalaya Foundation, Inc.	**JL Burgos – Alipato at Muog**; Arlie Sweet Sumagaysay & Richard Jeroui Salvadico – Tumandok; Jaime Pacena II – Kono Basho; Khavn – Rizal's Makamisa: Pantasma ng Higanti; Lav Diaz – Phantosmia; Lawrence Fajardo – The Hearing; Zig Dulay – Green Bones
Best Actor Pinakamahusay na Pangunahing Aktor	Best Actress Pinakamahusay na Pangunahing Aktres
**Dennis Trillo – Green Bones**; Baron Geisler – Dearly Beloved; Carlo Aquino – Crosspoint; Enzo Osorio – The Hearing; Ronnie Lazaro – Phantosmia; Ruru Madrid – Green Bones; Sid Lucero – Outside	**Arisa Nakano – Kono Basho**; Aicelle Santos – Isang Himala; Gabby Padilla – Kono Basho; Jenaica Sangher – Tumandok; Lovi Poe – Guilty Pleasure; Mylene Dizon – The Hearing
Best Supporting Actor Pinakamahusay na Pangalawang Aktor	Best Supporting Actress Pinakamahusay na Pangalawang Aktres
**Felipe Ganancial – Tumandok**; Art Acuña – An Errand; David Ezra – Isang Himala; Nor Domingo – The Hearing; Takehiro Hira – Crosspoint	**Kakki Teodoro – Isang Himala**; Bituin Escalante – Isang Himala; Chanda Romero – Espantaho; Ina Feleo – The Hearing; Kei Kurosawa – Crosspoint; Rowena Sangher – Tumandok
Best Screenplay Pinakamahusay na Dulang Pampelikula	Best Cinematography Pinakamahusay na Sinematograpiya
**Tumandok – Arden Rod Condez and Arlie Sweet Sumagaysay**; Alipato at Muog – JL Burgos and Bernardine De Belen; Green Bones – Ricky Lee and Anj Atienza; Kono Basho – Jaime Pacena II; The Hearing – Honeylyn Joy Alipio	**Kono Basho – Dan Villegas**; Alipato at Muog – JL Burgos; Green Bones – Neil Daza; Phantosmia – Lav Diaz; Tumandok – Pabelle Manikan
Best Production Design Pinakamahusay na Disenyong Pamproduksyon	Best Editing Pinakamahusay na Editing
**Green Bones – Marxie Maolen Fadul**; Alipato at Muog – JL Burgos; Kono Basho – Eero Yves Francisco; Phantosmia – Lav Diaz; Rizal's Makamisa: Pantasma ng Higanti –Zeus Bascon; Tumandok – Lynne Belle Salvadico	**Alipato at Muog – JL Burgos**; Kono Basho – Marya Ignacio; Rizal's Makamisa: Pantasma ng Higanti – Furan Guillermo; The Hearing – Lawrence Fajardo and Ysabelle Denoga; Tumandok – Pabelle Manikan
Best Music Pinakamahusay na Musika	Best Sound Pinakamahusay na Tunog
**Tumandok – Paulo Almaden, The Ati People of Kabarangkalan and Nagpana**; Green Bones – Len Calvo; Isang Himala – Vincent De Jesus; Kono Basho – Len Calvo; Rizal's Makamisa: Pantasma ng Higanti – David Toop, Khavn and The Kontra-Kino Orchestra	**The Hearing – Jannina Mikaela Minglanilla and Michaela Docena**; Crosspoint – Ronaldo de Asis; Isang Himala – Albert Michael Idioma and Emilio Bien Sparks; Kono Basho – Allen Roy Santos; Tumandok – Lamberto Casas Jr., Alexis Tomboc, Kevin Padilla

== Special Award ==
=== Natatanging Gawad Urian ===
- Dante Rivero

== Multiple nominations and awards ==
Films that received multiple nominations
Nominations	Films
11	Tumandok
10	Kono Basho
9	The Hearing
8	Green Bones
6	Alipato at Muog
6	Isang Himala
5	Phantosmia
5	Rizal's Makamisa: Pantasma ng Higanti
4	Crosspoint

Films that won multiple awards
Awards	Film
4	Tumandok
3	Alipato at Muog
2	Green Bones
2	Kono Basho
