= Balota (film) =

2024 Philippine political thriller drama film

- Theatrical release poster
- Directed by: Kip Oebanda
- Written by: Kip Oebanda
- Produced by: Nessa S. Valdellon; Lilybeth G. Rasonable
- Starring: Marian Rivera
- Cinematography: Tey Clamor
- Edited by: Chuck Gutierrez
- Music by: Emerzon Texon
- Production companies: GMA Pictures; GMA Entertainment Group; Film Development Council of the Philippines
- Distributed by: GMA Pictures
- Release dates: August 3, 2024 (Cinemalaya); October 16, 2024; (Philippines)
- Running time: 102 minutes
- Country: Philippines
- Language: Filipino
- Box office: ₱40 million

Balota (lit. 'Ballot') is a 2024 Philippine political thriller film written and directed by Kip Oebanda. The film stars Marian Rivera as Emmy, a teacher who is thrust into a dangerous situation during a volatile local election, with Will Ashley, Nico Antonio, Royce Cabrera, Raheel Bhyria, Sue Prado, Sassa Gurl, Esnyr, Donna Cariaga, Joel Saracho, Gardo Versoza, and Mae Paner in supporting roles. It was produced by GMA Pictures, GMA Entertainment Group, and the Film Development Council of the Philippines.

Balota premiered at the 20th Cinemalaya Philippine Independent Film Festival on August 3, 2024, before its international theatrical release on October 16. During its theatrical run, the film became one of the notable box office performers among Filipino films released in 2024. The film received generally positive reviews, with particular acclaim for Rivera's performance. It also received several accolades, including winning Best Film at the 2026 Philippine Arts, Film and Television Awards.

== Plot ==
Emmy, a teacher and mother to her son Enzo, lives in a town where she also serves as an election worker. During the 2007 elections, her school doubles as a polling station, where she monitors the voting process amid a chaotic campaign. Violence, including killings and ballot-snatching orchestrated by a gang led by Migs, plagues the event, while vote-buying schemes distort the mayoral race. The race pits Edralin, a former actor running on a platform of change, against Hidalgo, a corrupt incumbent who owns multiple businesses and mistreats her employees – among them, Emmy's close friends.

The election is tightly contested, with only the results from Emmy's precinct still uncounted. A COMELEC representative arrives at the school, requesting escorts to transport the ballot box holding the final votes to the governor. Emmy volunteers for the mission and is joined by her colleague, Waks. Before they depart, the principal handcuffs Emmy to the ballot box to ensure the votes' safety. During the journey, the COMELEC representative, revealed to be a turncoat for ballot-snatchers, attempts to bribe them into surrendering the box. When they refuse, he draws a gun and mortally wounds Waks. Emmy strikes the shooter down with the ballot box and flees the scene.

Emmy hides in the back of a passing truck but flees into the forest after overhearing police at a checkpoint urging the driver to remain silent regarding the murders of Waks and the COMELEC representative. She contacts Enzo, who is currently with her cousin Melissa and her son, Jimbo. Soon after, two officers, Morales and Pastor, arrive and arrest Enzo; he manages to conceal his phone. While in custody, the officers inform Enzo that Emmy is the primary suspect in the double murder of Waks and the COMELEC representative. Jimbo follows Enzo to the police station, but is captured and held hostage along with Melissa by Migs. Migs demands Emmy reveal her location, but during the confrontation, Jimbo stabs Migs in the leg. In retaliation, Migs shoots both Jimbo and Melissa dead, a tragedy Emmy witnesses from a phone call. At their final rendezvous, Emmy avenges her family by stabbing Migs in the neck with a pen and pushing him down a slope to his death.

As Pastor and Morales transport Enzo, Pastor discovers Enzo's phone and stages a mock execution, summoning Emmy to witness the scene. However, the situation escalates when Morales kills Pastor for attempting to summarily execute Enzo on false charges. After rescuing Enzo, Morales reveals that he owes Emmy for accepting his gay identity, though he admits he remains unaware of who is issuing his orders.

Believing Hidalgo is responsible for the ballot-snatching, Emmy seeks help from Edralin at his estate, only to discover he orchestrated the incident when he attempts to bribe her into surrendering the box. Discreetly warning Enzo while flattering Edralin to buy time, she enables him and Morales to mobilize the community against him, despite their lingering resentment toward Hidalgo. As the crowd storms the estate to rescue Emmy just as Edralin realizes her ruse and prepares to kill her, he is arrested by Morales. Hidalgo arrives shortly after to express her appreciation for Emmy securing the ballot box, whose results ensure her reelection. However, Emmy reveals her contempt for both politicians, demanding that Hidalgo treat her employees fairly in exchange for certifying that no voter fraud occurred; Hidalgo reluctantly complies.

Three years later, Hidalgo is suspended for corruption while an imprisoned Edralin runs again for the mayoralty facing Babe, Emmy's friend. Having been appointed and promoted to the role of school principal, Emmy returns to her role as an election worker, and frustratingly watches the state of politics in the country.

== Cast ==
- Marian Rivera as Emmy
- Will Ashley as Enzo
- Royce Cabrera as SPO1 Jeremy Morales
- Nico Antonio as Migs
- Raheel Bhyria as Jimbo
- Sue Prado as Melissa
- Sassa Gurl as Dominador "Babe" Babista
- Esnyr as Ehrmengard
- Donna Cariaga as Anita Hernandez
- Joel Saracho as Pastor
- Gardo Versoza as Giancarlo Edraline
- Mae Paner as Elena Hidalgo

== Production ==
=== Development and casting ===
After directing Bar Boys (2017) and Liway (2018), Oebanda took on the film as his next project. Oebanda stated that the original script was written in 2019. He described the film as a response to the 2022 Philippine elections. Through the film, he sought to address issues of corruption and election fraud while encouraging voters to make informed choices. The film is co-produced by GMA Pictures, GMA Entertainment Group, and Film Development Council of the Philippines. It was GMA Pictures' first entry to the Cinemalaya Independent Film Festival.

The film stars Marian Rivera as Emmy, a teacher responsible for protecting a crucial ballot box during a politically charged crisis. Oebanda first considered Rivera for the film after seeing her performance in a pandemic-era production of Himala. She eventually joined the project following a script reading and discussions with Oebanda about political themes, despite initial scheduling concerns. Oebanda stated that Rivera was deeply committed to her role and wanted to authentically experience her character's journey. He recalled that she frequently applied actual soil to her face and body during scenes set in the forest. The role challenged Rivera both physically and emotionally, ultimately enabling her to demonstrate a broader range of acting skills.

The supporting cast includes Will Ashley, Royce Cabrera, Nico Antonio, Raheel Bhyria, Sue Prado, Joel Saracho, Gardo Versoza, Mae Paner, Donna Cariaga, Sassa Gurl, and Esnyr. Oebanda explained that the casting decisions were influenced by the pivotal roles women and LGBTQ individuals have historically played in political campaigns and activism. He emphasized that their significant contributions were a key factor in the film's development and wanted to ensure this representation was accurately reflected on screen.

=== Filming ===
Principal photography was shot by cinematographer Tey Clamor. Rivera stated that she did not want to use a body double in her role in the film. She also dismissed concerns about potential injuries, noting that the adrenaline and focus required for acting made her forget about the risk of getting hurt. She believed that if she focused on the possibility of injury, it would negatively impact her performance.

== Themes ==
We made a film about people who are sick and tired of having the rich and powerful take their power and voice away from them.

— Kip Oebanda

The central themes of the film delivers a clear message about corruption, deceit, integrity, and democracy that plague Philippine elections, it also explores the dangers of blindly idolizing politicians. Satire serves as its main form of political commentary, reflecting a reality in which candidates backed by money and political machinery has the upper hand, while the candidate with genuine intentions and fewer resources struggles to be heard. However, rather than presenting fresh insights or a thought-provoking perspective, the film rehashes problems that are already familiar to many Filipinos.

Oebanda expressed that while the corruption of the electoral system is a longstanding issue, it does not have to be inevitable. He pointed to the high rate of violence in Philippine elections including the killing of poll officials, rampant vote buying, and corrupt state forces. He also referenced real-life teachers Filomena Tatlonghari and Nellie Banaag who were killed by gunmen in an ambush of a polling precinct in the 1995 and 2007 elections, respectively.

== Release ==
The film's official teaser was released on July 5, 2024, providing an initial look at the film. The official poster was revealed on July 12, 2024. The 30-second official trailer was released on July 22, 2024.

The film premiered at the 20th Cinemalaya Independent Film Festival on August 3, 2024 and at the Hawaii International Film Festival on October 6, 2024. It was released in cinemas nationwide on October 16, 2024. An exclusive screening for employees at Malacañang Palace was held on December 5, 2024. The production received an official invitation from DESFA-Malacañang and Eduksine to hold the screening. An open forum with director Kip Oebanda and cast members Will Ashley, Joel Saracho, and Felix Petate was held after the screening. It was digitally released on Netflix on January 31, 2025.

== Reception ==
=== Box office ===
A week into the Cinemalaya festival, the film was revealed to be one of the top two performing films in terms of ticket sales, according to the Cinemalaya organization. The film was later reported to be among the box office hits of the 2024 Cinemalaya Independent Film Festival.

Following its nationwide release on October 16, 2024, Balota continued to draw audiences in cinemas during its third week of exhibition. Nearly two weeks after its release, the film was reported to have recorded sold-out screenings in almost 200 cinemas nationwide, helping it emerge as one of the year's highest-grossing local releases. According to a retrospective on Philippine cinema in 2024, the film earned ₱40 million ($660,415) at the box office during its theatrical run that year.

=== Critical reception ===
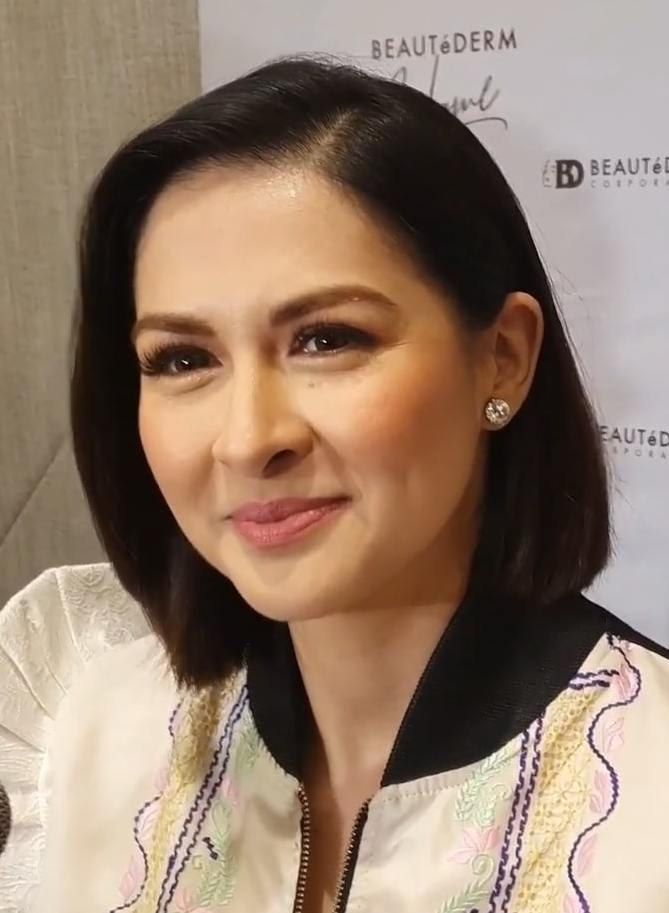
Marian Rivera's performance received praise from critics.

The film received generally positive reviews, with particular acclaim for Marian Rivera's performance. The review aggregator Kritikultura gives the film a score of 70 out of 100 based on 14 reviews. Most reviews praised Marian Rivera's performance.

Nicol Latayan of the International Cinephile Society gave the film a score of 3 out of 5. While he praised the film's depiction of local elections and its satirical approach, he felt that its reliance on humor weakened the impact of its political message, writing that the film's message "plays second fiddle" to its comedy. Latayan nevertheless singled out Rivera's performance for praise, describing her as the film's "greatest asset" and stating that she "fits the role like a glove", bringing the character of Teacher Emmy the energy and conviction needed for the role.

Stephanie Mayo of the Daily Tribune praised Rivera for her portrayal of Teacher Emmy, a character who stands up for what is right while handcuffed to a ballot box. However, Mayo criticized the film’s comedic and theatrical elements, which she felt weakened its potential for strong, impactful commentary. She felt that it clearly aimed to please its audience without any subtlety, ultimately giving it a rating of 2 out of 5 stars. Philbert Dy of the Spot criticized the film's approach to political satire as "toothless", stating that it reiterates known points without adding depth. However, as mainstream entertainment, it could be seen as edgy. He praised Rivera's performance, noting how her energy elevates the film. Kathleen A. Llemit of The Philippine Star spoke of Rivera's performance, "Do not let her award-winning performance in 'Balota' [...] be just another footnote in her Wikipedia page." She further praised Balota for telling a message in an "easily digestible and understandable" way, in contrast to "highbrow" films. Fred Hawson of ABS-CBN praised Rivera's standout performance and how she handled dramatic and comedic scenes. He also noted that the film was timely because of its portrayal of Philippine elections, saying that it encourages voters to take the electoral process seriously and make more informed decisions.

Wanggo Gallaga of ClickTheCity observed that film combines a mainstream story with indie-style, using a thrilling story to encourage reflection. He praised the performances, especially Rivera's portrayal, saying that she brought out the character's toughness, compassion, and strong sense of morality in a way that felt natural and believable without making her seem "corny" or "fictional". Angelo Chu of SINEGANG observed that the film opens with a lively election jingle, a choice that contrasted with the darker tone suggested by its promotional campaign and surprised some viewers. Chu considered Rivera's performance one of the film's strengths.

=== Accolades ===
Accolades received by Balota
Award ceremony	Date	Category	Recipient(s)	Result	Ref.
Cinemalaya	August 11, 2024	Best Actress	Marian Rivera	Won	
Rising Filipino Awards	November 24, 2024	Best Actress	Marian Rivera	Won	
TAG Victorious Awards Chicago	January 15, 2025	Best Actress	Marian Rivera	Won	
Gawad Dangal Filipino Awards	January 23, 2025	Best Actress	Marian Rivera	Won	
Primetime Media Choice Awards	January 28, 2025	Excellence in Performance Award	Marian Rivera	Won	
Pinoy Rebyu Awards	March 8, 2025	Best Lead Performance	Marian Rivera	Nominated	
Pinoy Rebyu Awards	March 8, 2025	Best Film Editing	Chuck Gutierrez	Nominated	
Lasallian Scholarum Awards	March 13, 2025	Outstanding Feature Film on Youth and Education	Balota	Nominated	
Box Office Entertainment Awards	June 28, 2025	Film Actress of the Year	Marian Rivera	Won	
The EDDYS	July 20, 2025	Best Actress	Marian Rivera	Won	
FAMAS Award	August 22, 2025	Best Actress	Marian Rivera	Won	
FAMAS Award	August 22, 2025	Best Supporting Actor	Will Ashley	Nominated	
Manila Film Critics Circle Awards	October 11, 2025	Best Actress	Marian Rivera	Won	
Manila Film Critics Circle Awards	October 11, 2025	Best Supporting Actor	Will Ashley	Won	
Manila Film Critics Circle Awards	October 11, 2025	Best Picture	Balota	Won	
Manila Film Critics Circle Awards	October 11, 2025	Best Original Story	Balota	Won	
PMPC Star Awards for Movies	November 30, 2025	New Movie Actor of the Year	Will Ashley	Won	
Gawad Lasallianeta	January 26, 2026	Most Outstanding Film Actress	Marian Rivera	Won	
Gawad Lasallianeta	January 26, 2026	Most Outstanding Film	Balota	Won	
Philippine Arts, Film and Television Awards	February 21, 2026	Best Actress	Marian Rivera	Won	
Philippine Arts, Film and Television Awards	February 21, 2026	Modern Grand Slam Best Actress	Marian Rivera	Won	
Philippine Arts, Film and Television Awards	February 21, 2026	Best Supporting Actor	Will Ashley	Won	
Philippine Arts, Film and Television Awards	February 21, 2026	Best Film	Balota	Won	
Philippine Arts, Film and Television Awards	February 21, 2026	Best Original Story	Balota	Nominated	
Philippine Arts, Film and Television Awards	February 21, 2026	Best Director	Kip Oebanda	Nominated	
Philippine Arts, Film and Television Awards	February 21, 2026	Best Screenplay	Kip Oebanda	Nominated	
Philippine Arts, Film and Television Awards	February 21, 2026	Best Production Design	Eero Yves Francisco	Nominated	
Philippine Arts, Film and Television Awards	February 21, 2026	Best Editing	Chuck Gutierrez	Nominated	
Philippine Arts, Film and Television Awards	February 21, 2026	Best Sound	Narra Post Production	Won	
