= 2024 Cinemalaya =

Filipino film festival

20th Cinemalaya Independent Film Festival
- Official festival poster
- Closing film: Third World Romance by Dwein Baltazar
- Location: Metro Manila, Philippines
- Film titles: 10
- Festival date: August 4–11, 2024
- Language: English, Filipino
- Website: www.cinemalaya.org

Cinemalaya chronology
- 2025 2023

The 20th Cinemalaya Independent Film Festival billed as Cinemalaya Bente was held from August 2 to 11, 2024 in Metro Manila, Philippines.

The main venue for the film festival is the Ayala Malls Manila Bay in Parañaque since the traditional venue the Cultural Center of the Philippines Complex is being renovated.

== Entries ==
The winning film is highlighted with boldface and a dagger.

Feature Films

Title	Director	Starring	Genre	Ref.
Alipato at Muog	JL Burgos	N/A	Documentary	
Balota	Kip Oebanda	Marian Rivera	Comedy, Suspense, Satire	
An Errand	Dominic Bekaert	Sid Lucero, Art Acuña, Elora Españo, and Nanding Josef	Comedy drama	
Gulay Lang, Manong	BC Amparado	Cedrick Juan and Perry Dizon	Comedy drama	
The Hearing	Lawrence Fajardo	Mylene Dizon, Nor Domingo, Ina Feleo, Enzo Osorio	Drama	
Kantil	Joshua Caesar Medroso	Edmund Telmo, Andre Miguel, Sue Prado, Raul Arellano, Ram Botero, and Perry Dizon	Science fiction, LGBTQ	
Kono Basho	Jaime Pecana II	Gabby Padilla and Arisa Nakano	Drama	
Love Child	Jonathan Jurilla	Jane Oineza and RK Bagatsing	Drama	
**Tumandok** ^{†}	Richard Salvadico; Arlie Sumagaysay	Jenaica Sangher and Felipe Ganancial	Docufiction	
The Wedding Dance	Julius Lumiqued	Mai Fanglayan, Arvin Balageo	Historical drama	

Short Films

Title	Director	Ref.
Pamalandong sa Danow	Breech Asher Harani	
Mama	Alexandra Brizuela	
**Cross My Heart and Hope to Die** ^{†}	Sam Manacsa	
I Was Walking On the Streets of Chinatown	Ryan Capili	
Ambot Wa Ko Kabalo Unsay I-title Ani	Rey Anthony Villaverde	
An Baga Sa Dalam	Mariel Ritchie Jolejole and Roniño Dolim	
Abogbaybay	P.R. Monencillo Patindol	
Primetime Mother	Sonny Calvento	
All This Wasted Space	Cris Bringas	
Mariposa	Melanie Faye	

== Awards ==
2025 Cinemalaya Awards Night
- Date: August 11, 2025

Highlights
- Best Picture: Tumandok
- Best Director: Jaime Pacena II (Kono Basho)
- Best Actor: Enzo Osorio (The Hearing)
- Best Actress: Gabby Padilla (Kono Basho); Marian Rivera (Balota)
- Most awards: Tumandok (5)

The awards ceremony was held on August 11, 2025.

=== Feature films ===
- Best Film – Tumandok by Richard Salvadico and Arlie Sumagaysay
  - Special Jury Award – Alipato at Muog by JL Burgos
  - Audience Choice Award – Gulay Lang, Manong by BC Amparado
- Best Direction – Jaime Pacena II for Kono Basho
- Best Actor – Enzo Osorio for The Hearing
- Best Actress
  - Gabby Padilla for Kono Basho
  - Marian Rivera for Balota
- Best Supporting Actor – Felipe Ganancial for Tumandok
- Best Supporting Actress – Sue Prado for Kantil
- Best Screenplay – Tumandok
- Best Cinematography – Kono Basho
- Best Editing – An Errand
- Best Sound – An Errand
- Best Original Music Score – Tumandok
- Best Production Design – Kono Basho

=== Short films ===
- Best Film – Cross My Heart and Hope to Die
  - Special Jury Award – Pamalandong sa Danow
  - Audience Choice Award – Primetime Mother
- Best Screenplay – Primetime Mother

=== Special awards ===
- NETPAC Full-length Feature Award: Tumandok by Richard Salvadico and Arlie Sumagaysay
- NETPAC Short Film Award: Abogbaybay
