= Tumandok (film) =

- Theatrical release poster
- Directed by: Richard Jeroui Salvadico; Arlie Sweet Sumagaysay
- Screenplay by: Arden Rod Condez; Arlie Sweet Sumagaysay
- Starring: Jenaica Sangher
- Cinematography: Pabelle Manikan
- Edited by: Pabelle Manikan
- Music by: Paulo Almaden; The Ati People of Kabarangkalan and Nagpana
- Production company: Southern Lantern Studios
- Release date: August 2, 2024 (Cinemalaya)
- Running time: 88 minutes
- Country: Philippines
- Language: Inati

Tumandok (lit. 'the native') is a 2024 Philippine docufiction film directed by Richard Jeroui Salvadico and Arlie Sweet Sumagaysay. It narrates a fictionalized account of the Ati people in Iloilo fighting for their ancestral land.

== Premise ==
As per legends, it known to the Ati of Panay that an Ati chieftain once traded their land to Bornean datus for a necklace and gold hat. The mountainside remained the home of the Ati.

En-en (Jenaica Sangher), daughter of the chieftain of an Ati community, is tasked to oversee the processing a Certificate of Ancestral Domain Title (CADT) for their people. The tribe needs around ₱500 thousand to ₱1 million to expedite securing a formal document for their ancestral land.

== Cast ==
The cast played as fictionalized versions of themselves

- Jenaica Sangher as the daughter of the chieftain of the Ati community of Sitio Kabarangkalan. The film was depicted and based largely from the real Sangher's perspective.
- Felipe Ganancial as the Kabarangkalan Ati chieftain; this is his only acting credit since had no prior acting role and died in May 2025.

== Production ==
=== Conceptualization and development ===
Tumandok was directed by Iloilo-based Richard Jeroui Salvadico and Arlie Sweet Sumagaysay under Southern Lantern Studios. The Cinemalaya Foundation and the Film Development Council of the Philippines funded the project while Terminal Six Post, sponsored the post-production. Arden Rod Condez and Sumagaysay did the screenplay. Pabelle Manikan was the cinematographer and editor; Lynn Belle Salvadico was the production designer. The sound was did by Lamberto Casas Jr. and Alexis Tomboc. The original music score was by Paulo Almaden along with the Ati people of Kabarangkalan.

Tumandok marked as a directorial debut for Salvadico and Sumagaysay who are also a married couple. However they have submitted entries for the 2019 and 2022 editions of Cinemalaya. The duo had made frequent visits to Ati community in Barotac Viejo and made advoacy videos for them. They obtained information from Kabarangkalan members Ronnie and Ronemae Elosando, the latter being a former Ati chieftain. Elosando relayed to the directors their community's experience of being forcibly displaced from their land back in 2007 and the community's effort to secure a CADT for their ancestral land since then. Accounts of other Ati communities in the area was also incorporated in Tumandok. The film was produced to help the Atis of Kabarangkalan secure a CADT.

At least three films served as a template for Tumandok as cited by co-director Salvadico. Nomadland (2020) for the production setup as the Ati-focused film team had only a small crew and the cinematography where both teams use largely available lighe; Women Talking (2022) in terms of dialogue and Utama (2022) since the story of Tumandok is also focused on indigenous people.

The film also received support from the National Institute of Indigenous Peoples. The NCIP related the financial requirements to the production team that the Ati needed to satisfy.

The film also juxtaposed the killing of Panay Bukidnon indigenous people in December 2020 by government forces who alleged them being New People's Army rebels.

=== Casting and filming ===
The film's acting cast are all non-professionals who are members of the Ati community in Sitio Kabarangkalan of Barotac Viejo. The film is made in their native Inati language. The film which is a docufiction set in the sitio narrates the struggles of the Ati people for their ancestral lands and the issue of corruption. The community itself is involved in the scriptwriting with lead actress Jenaica Sangher serving as interpreter between the production team and her fellow Ati.

The production team settled in Sitio Kabarangkalan two months prior to the principal photography to establish the trust of the Ati community who are wary of lowlanders.

The filming process took only seven days. Five of which were spent in Sitio Kabarangkalan The whole film was 88 minutes long.

== Release ==
Tumandok premiered at the 20th Cinemalaya which started on August 2, 2024.

== Accolades ==
Tumandok is the biggest winner among the entrant films of the 2024 Cinemalaya, winning five awards in the film festival's awards' night. The film was also the most awarded work at the 48th Gawad Urian Awards.

Year	Award	Category	Recipient(s)	Result	Ref.
2024	Cinemalaya	Best Film	Tumandok	Won	
2024	Cinemalaya	Best Supporting Actor	Felipe Ganancial	Won	
2024	Cinemalaya	Best Screenplay	Arden Rod Condez and Arlie Sweet Sumagaysay	Won	
2024	Cinemalaya	Best Original Music Score	Paulo Almaden and The Ati People of Kabarangkalan and Nagpana	Won	
2024	Cinemalaya	NETPAC Award	Tumandok	Won	
2025	48th Gawad Urian Awards	Best Direction	Arlie Sweet Sumagaysay and Richard Jeroui Salvadico	Won	
2025	48th Gawad Urian Awards	Best Supporting Actor	Felipe Ganancial (posthumous)	Won	
2025	48th Gawad Urian Awards	Best Screenplay	Arden Rod Condez and Arlie Sweet Sumagaysay	Won	
2025	48th Gawad Urian Awards	Best Music	Paulo Almaden and The Ati People of Kabarangkalan and Nagpana	Won	
