= Children of the River (film) =

Philippine independent film

- Official movie poster
- Annak Ti Karayan
- Directed by: Maricel Cariaga
- Written by: Maricel Cariaga
- Produced by: Maricel Cariaga
- Starring: Noel Comia Jr.; Junyka Santarin; Dave Justine Francis; Ricky Oriarte
- Cinematography: Hector Calma
- Edited by: Maricel Cariaga; Zig Dulay; Jerome Dulin
- Music by: Lorenzo Nielsen
- Production companies: Spears Films; Luna Studios; GMA Pictures
- Distributed by: GMA Pictures
- Release date: August 3, 2019
- Running time: 90 minutes
- Country: Philippines
- Languages: Filipino; English

Children of the River (also known as Annak Ti Karayan) is a 2019 Philippine indie, coming of age drama film written, produced and directed by Maricel Cariaga. The film stars Noel Comia Jr., Junyka Santarin, Dave Justine Francis and Ricky Oriarte.

It is one of the entries of Cinemalaya 2019, where it was nominated as Best Film.

== Synopsis ==
The story follows four childhood friends, Elias, Pepsy, Robin and Agol who live in a remote village by the river of Quirino province. Elias is a smart and responsible son, Pepsy is a feisty tomboy, Robin is a frustrated rascal and Agol is a gentle giant whose lives are anchored by waiting a daily phones calls from their soldier fathers. When Elias meets Ted, an attractive tourist, an internal affection emerges leaving him confused and distraught. Elias seeks comfort from his friends while navigating his growing attraction towards Ted.

== Cast ==
- Noel Comia Jr. as Elias
- Junyka Santarin as Pepsy
- Dave Justine Francis as Robin
- Ricky Oriarte as Agol
- Rich Asuncion as Elvy
- Juancho Trivino as Ted
- Jay Manalo as Capt. Eleazar

== Reception ==
The film received mixed reviews. Veteran screenwriter Ricardo Lee praised the film for showcasing the simple life of the children who are unaware of the war surrounding them and its danger and stated that one of director Maricel Cariaga's strengths is the natural charm of the lives of ordinary people. Michael Tan of Fringe Magazine dismissed the film as a propaganda film disguised as a coming-of-age story, citing the anti-LGBT elements and Noel's character given more exposure than the other lead characters.
