= Kip Oebanda =

Filipino film director

- Born: Iloilo City, Philippines
- Education: San Beda University; Asian Institute of Management
- Occupations: Director, screenwriter, producer
- Years active: 2013–present
- Notable work: Liway; Bar Boys; Balota

Dakip "Kip" Oebanda (/ˈoʊ.ɛˌbændə/; OH-eh-BAN-də), is a Filipino film director, screenwriter, and producer. He is best known for directing Bar Boys (2017), Liway (2018), and Balota (2024). Oebanda is known for his films focusing on social realism and exploration of local social issues which became a trademark of his works in Philippine cinema.

== Early life and education ==
Dakip Oebanda was born in Iloilo City, Philippines, to Cecilia and Ricardo Flores-Oebanda. His spent his early childhood in prison, as both of his parents were political detainees during the martial law period in the Philippines. He earned a bachelor's degree in Economics from San Beda College and later obtained a master's degree in Economics and Management from the Asian Institute of Management. Despite his academic background, Oebanda's passion for filmmaking led him to pursue a career in the industry.

== Film career ==
Oebanda began his career in the Philippine film industry as an assistant director and production designer. His early work involved collaborating on films such as Shift (2013), directed by Siege Ledesma. This earned him a nomination for Best Production Design at the 2014 Gawad Urian Awards.

Oebanda's directorial debut came with the drama thriller film Tumbang Preso (2014), for which he also had writing credits. The film took place in a sardine factory and tackled the issue of human trafficking in the Philippines. It received critical acclaim from critics. He won the Best IFC Pitch at the Manila Film Financing Forum for the film. The same year, he was also the assistant director for Bukas na Lang, Sapagkat Gabi Na. Oebanda was part of the editing team for the 2016 film Patay na si Hesus.

In 2017, Oebanda received increased attention for Bar Boys, a film he directed, co-produced, and wrote. The film earned three wins and seven nominations from various award-giving bodies. Oebanda received a Best Screenplay nomination at the Gawad Urian Awards and was also nominated for Indie Movie Director of the Year at the PMPC Star Awards for Movies. He also wrote and directed the horror film Nay, an entry for the Cinema One Originals Film Festival the same year. The horror film was an allegory to the controversial war on drugs in the Philippines during the Duterte regime. It received seven nominations, with Oebanda nominated for Best Picture and Best Director.

In 2018, Oebanda would direct the semi-autobiographical film, Liway, which was well-received by critics. He received another PMPC Star Awards for Movies nomination for Indie Movie Director of the Year as well as a nomination for Indie Movie Screenwriter of the Year, which he shared with Zig Dulay.

Oebanda garnered further critical acclaim for Balota (2024), a political thriller he wrote and directed, which premiered at the 20th Cinemalaya Philippine Independent Film Festival and starred Marian Rivera in the lead role.

== Filmography ==
=== Film ===
| Year | Title | Credited as | | | | Notes |
| Year | Title | Director | Screen writer | Editor | Producer | Notes |
|---|---|---|---|---|---|---|
| 2013 | Shift | No | No | No | No | Production Designer |
| 2013 | Bukas na Lang, Sapagkat Gabi Na | Assistant Director | No | No | No | Assistant Director |
| 2014 | Tumbang Preso | Yes | Yes | No | No | Directorial debut |
| 2016 | Patay na si Hesus | No | No | Yes | No | Part of Editing Team |
| 2017 | Bar Boys | Yes | Yes | No | Yes | Co-producer |
| 2017 | Nay | Yes | Yes | No | No | |
| 2018 | Liway | Yes | Yes | No | No | Co-writer |
| 2019 | Abandoned | Yes | Yes | No | No | |
| 2024 | Balota | Yes | Yes | No | Executive | |
| 2025 | Bar Boys: After School | Yes | Yes | No | No | Director, co-writer |

=== Acting roles ===
Film

| Year | Title | Role | Director | Notes |
|---|---|---|---|---|
| 2016 | My Rebound Girl | Coffee shop customer | Emmanuel Dela Cruz | Bit part |
| 2019 | LSS | P2P Ticket Vendor | Jade Castro | Bit part |
| 2019 | Dead Kids | Crowd | Mikhail Red | Bit part |
| 2020 | Block Z | Zombie | Mikhail Red | Guest Role |
| 2022 | Leonor Will Never Die | Hospital Crowd | Martika Ramirez Escobar | Bit part |

== Accolades ==
Awards and nominations received by Kip Oebanda
Awards and Nominations
| Organization | Year | Nominated Work | Category | Result | Ref. |
|---|---|---|---|---|---|
| Cinemalaya Independent Film Festival | 2018 | Liway | Best Film | Nominated | |
| Cinemalaya Independent Film Festival | 2018 | Liway | Audience Award | Won | |
| Cinemalaya Independent Film Festival | 2018 | Liway | Special Jury Commendation | Won | |
| Cinemalaya Independent Film Festival | 2024 | Balota | Best Film | Nominated | |
| Cinema One Originals Digital Film Festival | 2013 | Shift | Best Production Design | Nominated | |
| Cinema One Originals Digital Film Festival | 2017 | Nay | Best Picture | Nominated | |
| Cinema One Originals Digital Film Festival | 2017 | Nay | Best Director | Nominated | |
| EDDYS Awards | 2019 | Liway | Best Director | Nominated | |
| FAMAS Awards | 2025 | Balota | Best Screenplay | Nominated | |
| Gawad Urian Awards | 2014 | Shift | Best Production Design | Nominated | |
| Gawad Urian Awards | 2018 | Bar Boys | Best Screenplay | Nominated | |
| Gawad PASADO | 2025 | Balota | Pinakapasadong Direktor (Best Director) | Nominated | |
| Gawad PASADO | 2025 | Balota | Pinakapasadong Dulang Pampelikula (Best Screenplay) | Won | |
| Gawad PASADO | 2025 | Balota | Pinakapasadong Istorya (Best Story) | Nominated | |
| Luna Awards | 2019 | Liway | Best Director | Nominated | |
| Luna Awards | 2019 | Liway | Best Screenplay (with Zig Dulay) | Won | |
| Manila Film Financing Forum | 2013 | Tumbang Preso | Best IFC Pitch | Won | |
| Metro Manila Film Festival | 2025 | Bar Boys: After School | Best Director | Nominated | |
| Metro Manila Film Festival | 2025 | Bar Boys: After School | Best Screenplay | Nominated | |
| Platinum Stallion National Media Awards | 2026 | Bar Boys: After School | Director of the Year | Won | |
| PMPC Star Awards for Movies | 2018 | Bar Boys | Indie Movie Director of the Year | Nominated | |
| PMPC Star Awards for Movies | 2018 | Bar Boys | Indie Movie Screenwriter of the Year | Nominated | |
| PMPC Star Awards for Movies | 2019 | Liway | Indie Movie Director of the Year | Nominated | |
| PMPC Star Awards for Movies | 2019 | Liway | Indie Movie Screenwriter of the Year (with Zig Dulay) | Nominated | |
| PMPC Star Awards for Movies | 2025 | Balota | Indie Movie Director of the Year | Nominated | |
| PMPC Star Awards for Movies | 2025 | Balota | Indie Movie Screenwriter of the Year | Nominated | |
| VP Choice Awards | 2025 | Balota | Movie Director of the Year | Nominated | |
