= The Bit Player (2013 film) =

2013 comedy-drama film by Jeffrey Jeturian

- Film poster
- Filipino: Ekstra
- Directed by: Jeffrey Jeturian
- Written by: Jeffrey Jeturian; Antoinette Jadaone; Zig Dulay
- Produced by: Josabeth Alonso; Jeffrey Jeturian; Charo Santos-Concio; Malou N. Santos; Vilma Santos-Recto; John Victor Tence
- Starring: Vilma Santos
- Cinematography: Lee Briones
- Edited by: Glenn M. Ituriaga; Zig Dulay
- Music by: Vincent A. de Jesus
- Production companies: Cinemalaya Foundation; Quantum Films
- Distributed by: ABS-CBN Film Productions (Note: Released under the joint label, Star Cinema/ABS-CBN Film Productions Inc.)
- Release dates: July 27, 2013 (Cinemalaya); August 14, 2013 (Philippines)
- Running time: 111 minutes
- Country: Philippines
- Languages: Filipino; English

The Bit Player (Filipino: Ekstra) is a 2013 Philippine comedy-drama film co-produced and directed by Jeffrey Jeturian from a story and screenplay he co-written with Antoinette Jadaone and Zig Dulay, who co-edited the film. Starring Vilma Santos, the story follows Loida Malabanan, a mother who spends her days dreaming of her big break while working with the country's best small-screen actors. It also features the appearances of various actors and actresses including Marian Rivera, Richard Yap, Piolo Pascual, Eula Valdez, Cherry Pie Picache, and Cherie Gil.

Produced by Cinemalaya Foundation and Quantum Films, with ABS-CBN Film Productions handling its distribution, the film was released on July 27, 2013, as one of the competing entries under the "Directors Showcase" category for the 9th Cinemalaya Independent Film Festival and then, topped the box office in all four venues of said festival. It was later released in mainstream cinemas on August 14, as part of the film studio's 20th founding anniversary.

The film had its international premiere at the 38th Toronto International Film Festival, set from September 5 to 15, under the "Contemporary World Cinema" section. It also showed at the 2013 San Diego Asian Film Festival.

== Plot ==
The film follows a seemingly usual day in the life of Loida Malabanan (Vilma Santos) as she embarks on yet another shooting day of a soap opera as an extra. As the shoot goes on, we get a glimpse of the truth behind the ruling system of the production as well as the exploitation of the marginalized laborers like her.

== Cast ==
- Vilma Santos as Loida Malabanan
- Fatima Centeno as Production Assistant
- Marlon Rivera as Director
- Vincent de Jesus as Assistant Director
- Ruby Ruiz as Josie
- Tart Carlos as Venus
- Hazel Faith Dela Cruz as Olga
- Marian Rivera as Herself / Belinda
- Piolo Pascual as Himself / Brando
- Cherie Gil as Herself / Doña Beatrix
- Pilar Pilapil as Ms. Amanda / Doña Esmeralda
- Tom Rodriguez as Himself / Rafael
- Eula Valdez as Herself
- Cherry Pie Picache as Herself / Ma'am Amelia
- Richard Yap as Himself / Sir Richard
- Terence Baylon as Police 1

== Reception ==
=== Critical reception ===
Richard Kuipers, writing for Variety, described the written screenplay by Jeffrey Jeturian, Antoinette Jadaone, and Zig Dulay as "wise and witty" and "hits the right mix of humor and compassion from the outset". Kuipers also praised director Jeturian and his team for making the film with the best results and cinematographer Lee Briones for its photography that balances between comedy and drama for Vilma Santos' character and her background.

=== Accolades ===
- 9th Cinemalaya Independent Film Festival (Directors Showcase)
  - Special Jury Prize
  - Audience Choice
  - NETPAC Award
  - Best Actress – Vilma Santos
  - Best Supporting Actress – Ruby Ruiz
  - Best Screenplay
  - Nominated–Best Film

Gawad Tanglaw Awards 2014

  - Best Actress - (Vilma Santos)

13th Dhaka International Film Festival

  - Best Actress - (Vilma Santos)

2015 New York Festivals

  - Best Feature Film - Bronze
