= Rights (film) =

2007 Filipino anthology documentary film

- Directed by: Various (see below)
- Production companies: Free Jonas Burgos Movement; Southern Tagalog Exposure
- Release date: August 2007
- Running time: 20 minutes
- Country: Philippines
- Languages: Filipino; English

Rights (also known as Rights Volume I) is a 2007 Filipino short anthology documentary film produced by the collectives Southern Tagalog Exposure and the Free Jonas Burgos Movement. A compilation of independently produced public service announcements, the film is themed around the "present human rights situation in the Philippines". Filmmakers Sunshine Matutina and Kiri Dalena made the film to bring attention to the enforced disappearance of activist Jonas Burgos in April 2007, a case which has remained unsolved as of 2023.

In September 2007, the Movie and Television Review and Classification Board (MTRCB) gave the film a controversial "X" rating for "undermin[ing] the faith and confidence of the government", which prompted criticisms of censorship against the board; the rating was lowered to R-13 a week later.

== Short films ==
Final list of films by 2008:

- Definition #1 (JL Burgos)
- Where Is Jonas? (Kiri Dalena)
- Ignorante (Jon Red)
- The Disappeared (Anna Isabelle Matutina)
- Tanga (Paolo Villaluna)
- Unang Araw (King Catoy)
- Lost and Found (Sigrid Andrea Bernardo)
- Good News (Pam Miras)
- Human Rights Worker (RJ Mabilin)
- Adelisa (Kiri Dalena)
- Bangka o Eroplano (Sigrid Andrea Bernardo)
- Diyaryo (Mike Dagñalan)
- Ikaw (VTagaro)
- One Tilted Screen (John Torres)
- Dukot (Sigfreid Barros-Sanchez)
- Juan Takbo (Anna Isabelle Matutina)
- Karne (Sigfreid Barros-Sanchez)

== Production ==
The Rights project was begun by filmmakers Anna Isabelle "Sunshine" Matutina and Kiri Dalena after activist Jonas Burgos was abducted on April 28, 2007. Matutina thought of creating a film that would bring attention to Burgos' disappearance and shared the idea with Dalena. It was then decided that the film would take the form of a compilation of public service announcements made by various independent filmmakers so that they would "commit pro bono" in creating shorts for the project.

== Release ==
An early version of Rights which then consisted of nine films was released on DVD in August 2007. By next month, the filmmakers met with the Independent Filmmakers Cooperative (IFC), organizers of the film festival Indie Sine at Robinson's Galleria, to arrange for a screening of the film at the festival on September 21, 2007, to coincide with the 35th anniversary of the declaration of martial law in the country.

=== MTRCB classification controversy ===
Before the film could be screened at Indie Sine, the Movie and Television Review and Classification Board (MTRCB) gave the film an "X" rating on September 18, a classification which effectively prohibits any film from being screened due to local theaters having no permission to exhibit X-rated films. The three board members who gave the rating reasoned that the film is "one-sided and undermines the faith and confidence of the government and duly constituted authorities". All 13 directors of the short films compiled in Rights jointly criticized the decision as curtailing their freedom of expression, while film director Carlitos Siguion-Reyna (son of former MTRCB chairwoman Armida Siguion-Reyna) condemned the rating as "simply censorship".

After the filmmakers appealed the rating, the MTRCB held a second review of the film with five other board members led by lawyer Eric Mallonga, and lowered the film's classification to an R-13 rating on September 26.

== See also ==
- Alipato at Muog, a 2024 feature-length documentary film also made in response to the disappearance of Jonas Burgos
- Human rights in the Philippines
- Extrajudicial killings and forced disappearances in the Philippines
