= Bambanti =

2015 Filipino drama film

- Official movie poster
- Directed by: Zig Dulay
- Written by: Zig Dulay
- Produced by: Brillante Mendoza; Wilson Tieng; Jed Medrano; Lucky Jay De Guzman
- Starring: Alessandra de Rossi; Shamaine Buencamino; Micko Laurente; Delphine Buencamino; Erlinda Villalobos; Julio Diaz; Abegail Edilla
- Cinematography: Sol Garcia
- Edited by: Zig Dulay; Cyril Bautista
- Music by: Gian Cianan
- Distributed by: Solar Entertainment; Centerstage Productions
- Release date: March 18, 2015
- Running time: 90 minutes
- Country: Philippines
- Languages: Filipino, Ilocano
- Budget: P2 million

Bambanti (international title Scarecrow) is a 2015 Filipino independent film directed by Zig Dulay starring Alessandra de Rossi, Shamaine Buencamino, Micko Laurente and Julio Diaz. The film is named after the Ilocano word for scarecrow.

== Plot ==
Belyn is a young widow who lives in extreme poverty with her mother Maryang and three children, Popoy, May–May and Yan-Yan. Belyn tends their rural farmstead alone after her husband Dante, a peasant activist, was assassinated by unknown gunmen. She also takes weekly jobs as a laundrywoman for Martha, the wife of her husband's brother Daniel, in the town, taking Popoy along with her.

One day, Martha arranges to have Popoy fetched to her home from school, and asks him whether he had seen an expensive gold watch that went missing after his and Belyn's last cleaning job. Popoy denies seeing the watch and is stressed out when Martha insinuates that he took it. When Belyn comes to do her weekly tasks, Martha's daughter Cristy taunts Belyn with insinuations about them stealing the watch, leading to an argument. Popoy further breaks down when authorities become involved in the investigation while Belyn beats him up in order to tell the truth, but Popoy continues to deny stealing the watch. A visit to a psychic, who confirms that a man and a woman stole the watch, and by Cristy's grandmother Cita, who gave the watch to Cristy as an heirloom, also yields inconclusive results as Belyn and Martha's cordial relations deteriorate and Popoy and Belyn continue to deny the accusations.

News of the theft spreads, and Belyn and Popoy are shunned by the community as Cristy falsely accuses them of selling the watch. In anger, Belyn breaks the windows of Martha's house with a rock, while Popoy gets into a fight at school after being bullied by his classmates, leading to Belyn being summoned by the principal, who advises her to resolve the problem with the watch. As part of a school project, Popoy writes an emotional letter to Belyn, which is read out in class, leading to Belyn suffering an emotional breakdown. She subsequently confesses to the theft despite not doing it, but avoids punishment per a prior agreement with Martha, and finds peace with herself and her family.

As Belyn and her family move on from their tribulation, Cristy confesses to her parents that her boyfriend Jhung-Jhong, a notorious criminal, stole the watch, but framed Popoy instead, fearing that Jhung-Jhong would leave her. A furious Daniel berates her for ruining Belyn and Popoy, but Martha insists they keep quiet. At a festival, Belyn and Martha's families greet each other with silence. As a street-dance performance occurs, Belyn and her family cheer Popoy, who acts as a crucified-looking scarecrow in the performance, while Martha's family, burdened by their knowledge of the truth, looks on.

== Cast ==
- Alessandra de Rossi as Belyn
- Shamaine Buencamino as Martha
- Micko Laurente as Popoy
- Delphine Buencamino as Cristy
- Julio Diaz as Daniel
- Abegail Edillo as May–May
- Erlinda Villalobos as Lola Maryang
- Kiki Baento as Mrs. Liwayway
- Celio Aquino as Jhung-Jhong
- Jillian Pearl Paraggua as Yan-Yan
- Ligaya Rivera as School Principal
- Santiago Norberte as Psychic

== Production ==
Zig Dulay attributed the idea for the film from a personal experience. As a competitor in the inaugural Sinag Maynila Film Festival, Dulay, along with other competing directors, received a budget of P2 million from Sinag Maynila founder and CEO Wilson Tieng and Brillante Mendoza. Production of the film coincided with the week-long annual Bambanti Festival in Isabela in January 2015, which was also the setting for the film's conclusion. The film was shot in Luna, Isabela, with Shamaine and Delphine Buencamino reprising their real-life relationship as mother and daughter in the film.

The film was also Alessandra de Rossi's first collaboration with Dulay, who eventually cast her in several subsequent films such as Firefly. De Rossi also took a crash course in Ilocano as part of the film's dialogue, having described it as sounding like a "foreign language".

== Reception ==
Oggs Cruz, writing for Rappler, praised the film, comparing its story to a morality play and describing Zig Dulay's message as "criticizing how Filipinos hide their faults beneath colorful masks, costumes, smiles, and courteous gestures", only "to point fingers, offer that sacrificial lamb, all for the sake of overrated reputation" at times of reckoning. Ren Aguila, writing for GMA Network also praised the film and its suspense factor, but criticized aspects of its ending, saying that it could have left more suspense.

== Accolades ==
- 2015 - Sinag Maynila Film Festival (Best actress to Alessandra De Rossi)
- 2015 - International Children's Film Festival India (Best Actor to Micko Laurente)
- 2015 - Brussels International Film Festival (Best film)
- 2015 - Ajyal Youth Film Festival (Hilal Best Feature Film)
- 2016 - PMPC Star Awards for Movies
  - Indie Movie of the Year
  - Indie Movie Director of the Year (Zig Dulay)
  - Movie Child Performer of the Year (Micko Laurente)
  - Indie Production Designer of the Year (Aped Santos)
  - Indie Movie Original Theme Song of the Year (Tulog Na; lyrics by Zig Dulay, composed by Gian Gianan, interpreted by Alessandra de Rossi)
