= Unless the Water Is Safer than the Land =

Unless the Water is Safer than the Land
- Directed by: Iar Lionel Arondaing
- Release date: August 3, 2018
- Country: Philippines
- Language: Filipino

Unless the Water is Safer than the Land, whose Filipino language title, Musmos na Sumibol sa Gubat ng Digma actually literally means "A Child Who Sprung out of Forest of War", is a 2018 Philippine independent film directed by Iar Lionel Arondaing.

It was released on August 3, 2018, as part of the 14th (2018) Cinemalaya Independent Film Festival, where it won the award for Best Sound in the full-length feature film category.

In the film, an old man recounts the coming-of-age tale of a young Muslim girl named Eshal (Junyka Sigrid Santarin) who is forced to hide in the forest with her infant brother Affan to escape the violence of the inter-familial dispute (locally called "Rido") that has plagued her family. In the forest, he meets a boy named Farhan (JM Salvado) with whom she develops a friendship as they wait for adults to find them and bring them back to their families.

The English title of the film is taken from Somali-British poet Warsan Shire's poem "Home", which introduces the film.

== Cast ==
- Junyka Sigrid Santarin (as Eshal)
- JM Salvado (as Farhan)
- Star Orjaliza
- Jun Salvado
- Darril Ampongan
- Romerico Jangad
- Haide Movero

== Reception ==
Film critic Oggs Cruz gave the film a mostly positive review, noting that:

Arondaing complements his tale of children hiding in the forest from the dangers of war with ample doses of mystery, setting an unsubtle mythical and primal mood to a story that seems current and pertinent.

Cruz specifically praised the films for its imagery:

There are scenes in Iar Arondaing’s Musmos na Sumibol sa Gubat ng Digma that are just terrifyingly striking, reflective of the mesmerizing draw of narratives derived from communities torn apart by war. There is one long and staggered frame of a family, rendered immobile perhaps by fear and awe, watching men burn their village. It single-handedly confronts the viewer with the terrible beauty of strife. The film is littered with these images. There is one where a naked woman stands in the middle of the river, staring intently at the viewer. There is another showing the canopy of the mangrove forest with a flock of white birds flying above it. In between more mundane scenes, verses from the Quran are chanted.

However, Cruz questioned the film's choice to have the characters speak in Tagalog, rather than one of the Bangsamoro languages that would have actually been used by the characters, who supposedly live in Muslim Mindanao. "Musmos na Sumibol sa Gubat ng Digma works best when it relishes in imagery," Cruz opines. "As soon as the characters talk, its shrouds of integrity and genuineness are removed, making it a tale, much like its young characters, that is sorely missing a home."

== See also ==
- Rido
- 14th Cinemalaya Independent Film Festival
- Cinemalaya Independent Film Festival
- Eddie Garcia
- Tony Labrusca
- Liway
- ML
- Women of the Weeping River
