= 37th Luna Awards =

2019 Philippine film awards ceremony

- Date: November 30, 2019
- Site: Maybank Performing Arts Theater

Highlights
- Best Picture: Goyo: Ang Batang Heneral
- Most awards: Liway (3); Goyo: Ang Batang Heneral (3)
- Most nominations: Liway (9); Signal Rock (9)

The 37th Luna Awards ceremony, presented by the Film Academy of the Philippines (FAP), honored the best Filipino films of 2018. It took place on November 30, 2019, at the Maybank Performing Arts Theater in Taguig, Philippines.

== Winners and nominees ==
=== Awards ===
Winners are listed first, highlighted in boldface.

Best Picture	Best Direction
**Goyo: Ang Batang Heneral – TBA Studios and Globe Studios**; BuyBust; Gusto Kita with All My Hypothalamus; Liway; Signal Rock	**Chito Roño – Signal Rock**; Dwein Baltazar – Gusto Kita with All My Hypothalamus; Erik Matti – BuyBust; Irene Villamor – Meet Me in St. Gallen; Kip Oebanda – Liway
Best Actor	Best Actress
**Daniel Padilla – The Hows of Us**; Christian Bables – Signal Rock; Dingdong Dantes – Sid & Aya: Not a Love Story; Eddie Garcia – Rainbow’s Sunset; Nicco Manalo – Gusto Kita with All My Hypothalamus	**Glaiza de Castro – Liway**; Agot Isidro – Changing Partners; Ai-Ai delas Alas – School Service; Anne Curtis – Sid & Aya: Not a Love Story; Angelica Panganiban – Exes Baggage
Best Supporting Actor	Best Supporting Actress
**Arjo Atayde – BuyBust**; Carlo Aquino – Goyo: Ang Batang Heneral; Epy Quizon – Goyo: Ang Batang Heneral; Mon Confiado – Signal Rock; Soliman Cruz – Liway	**Daria Ramirez – Signal Rock**; Aiko Melendez – Rainbow’s Sunset; Max Collins – Citizen Jake; Nova Villa – Miss Granny; Sunshine Dizon – Rainbow’s Sunset
Best Screenplay	Best Cinematography
**Liway – Zig Dulay and Kip Oebanda**; Goyo: Ang Batang Heneral – Rodolfo Vera and Jerrold Tarog; Meet Me in St. Gallen – Irene Villamor; Signal Rock – Rodolfo Vera; The Hows of Us – Carmi Raymundo, Gillian Ebreo, Crystal San Miguel and Cathy Garcia-Molina	**Gusto Kita with All My Hypothalamus – Neil Daza**; Ang Babaeng Allergic sa WiFi – Tey Clamor; BuyBust – Neil Derrick Bion; Liway – Pong Ignacio; Signal Rock – Neil Daza
Best Production Design	Best Editing
**Gusto Kita with All My Hypothalamus – Maolen Fadul**; BuyBust – Michael Español and Roma Regala; Goyo: Ang Batang Heneral – Roy Lachica; Liway – Aped Santos; Signal Rock – Mark Sabas	**Liway – Chuck Gutierrez**; Ang Dalawang Mrs. Reyes – Maynard Pattaui and Edlyn Tallada-Abuel; BuyBust – Jay Halili; Goyo: Ang Batang Heneral – Jerrold Tarog; The Hows of Us – Marya Ignacio and Noemi Paguiligan
Best Musical Score	Best Sound
**Goyo: Ang Batang Heneral – Jerrold Tarog**; Ang Babaeng Allergic sa WiFi – Emerzon Texon; BuyBust – Malek Lopez and Erwin Romulo; Liway – Nhick Ramiro Pacis; Meet Me in St. Gallen – Emerzon Texon	**Goyo: Ang Batang Heneral – Albert Michael Idioma and Alex Tomboc**; BuyBust – Whannie Dellosa and Steven Vesagas; Gusto Kita with All My Hypothalamus – Axel Fernandez; Meet Me in St. Gallen – Jason Conanan Mikko Quizon and Kat Salinas; Signal Rock – Albert Michael Idioma and Alex Tomboc

=== Special awards ===
The following honorary awards were also awarded.

- Fernando Poe, Jr. (FPJ) Lifetime Achievement Award – Lily Monteverde
- Manuel de Leon Award for Exemplary Achievements – Nova Villa
- Lamberto Avellana Memorial Award – Wenn Deramas, Soxie Topacio
