= Takehiro Hira =

Japanese actor (born 1974)

- 平 岳大
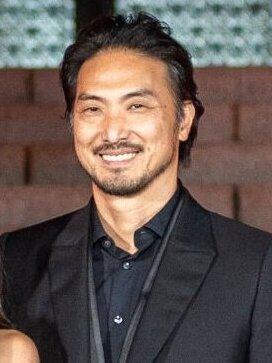
- Hira in 2024
- Born: July 27, 1974 (age 52); Tokyo, Japan
- Education: Brown University (BA); Columbia University
- Occupation: Actor
- Years active: 2001–present
- Parent(s): Mikijirō Hira (father); Yoshiko Sakuma (mother)

Takehiro Hira (平 岳大, Hira Takehiro; born July 27, 1974) is a Japanese theatre, film, and television actor.

== Early life and education ==
Hira was born in Setagaya, Tokyo, Japan to actors Mikijirō Hira and Yoshiko Sakuma and he had a twin sister. He was raised in Japan until he was 15 years old. He went to high school at Moses Brown School in Providence, Rhode Island, United States, and then attended Brown University.

== Career ==
He made his theatrical debut in 2002 with Rokumeikan which was written by Yukio Mishima. He worked closely with his father Mikijirō Hira, who was also a Japanese actor. Takehiro played the role of Iago in the production of Othello with his father playing Othello. He received major recognition when he played the last shogun Yoshinobu Tokugawa in the NHK taiga drama Atsuhime. He has appeared in several films of Takashi Miike, including Hara-Kiri: Death of a Samurai, Ace Attorney, and Aku no Kyoten. He plays Natsuka Masaie in the big-budget film Nobou's Castle.

=== International experience ===
He played the role of the Player Queen in the English stage production of Hamlet in 2005, in which the title role was played by Michael Maloney. This three-month tour was received well at many places in the UK.

Hira played the lead role in the 2019 British TV series Giri/Haji. He has also had notable parts in the American films Lost Girls & Love Hotels (2020) and Snake Eyes (2021) and a minor role in Gran Turismo. In 2024, Hira starred in FX's adaptation of Shōgun.

== Filmography ==
=== Film ===
Year	Title	Role	Notes	Ref.
2006	Memories of Tomorrow			
2007	Chacha	Gotō Mototsugu		
2010	Goodbye, Someday			
2010	SP: The Motion Picture	Eiji Takigawa		
2010	SP: The Motion Picture II	Eiji Takigawa		
2010	Aibō: Gekijō-ban II	Hideaki Maruyama		
2011	Hara-Kiri: Death of a Samurai	Ii Naotaka		
2012	Lesson of the Evil	Teacher Kume		
2012	Ace Attorney	Mitsurugi Shin / Gregory Edgeworth		
2012	The Floating Castle	Natsuka Masaie		
2013	Shundo	Master Harada	Lead role	
2013	The Eternal Zero	Lieutenant		
2015	Mother's Trees	Kenjirō		
2015	S The Last Policeman - Recovery of Our Future	doctor		
2015	Foujita	Lieutenant		
2017	Sekigahara	Shima Sakon		
2018	Killing for the Prosecution	Tanno		
2019	Erica 38			
2020	Lost Girls & Love Hotels	Kazu		
2021	Snake Eyes	Kenta		
2021	We Couldn't Become Adults	Keiichiro Sanai		
2023	Gran Turismo	Kazunori Yamauchi		
2024	Rumours	Tatsuro Iwasaki		
2024	Crosspoint	Shigeru Watanabe		
2025	Captain America: Brave New World	Prime Minister Ozaki		
2025	Tornado	Fujin		
2025	Rental Family	Shinji		
2026	Anima	Paul		
2027	Karoshi	TBA	Post-production	
TBA	The Degrees of Pain	TBA		
TBA	Stages	TBA	Filming	

=== Television ===
Year	Title	Role	Notes	Ref.
2008	Atsuhime	Tokugawa Yoshinobu	Taiga drama	
2009	Dandan	Sawada	Asadora	
2011	Go	Saji Kazunari	Taiga drama	
2012	Doctor Ume	Sanada	Asadora	
2016	Sanada Maru	Takeda Katsuyori	Taiga drama	
2019	Giri/Haji	Kenzo Mori		
2021	Yasuke	Oda Nobunaga (voice)	ONA	
2023	The Swarm	Riku Sato		
2023–present	Monarch: Legacy of Monsters	Hiroshi Randa		
2024	Shōgun	Ishido Kazunari		

== Stage ==
- Rokumeikan (2002)
- King Lear, Edmund (2003)
- And Then There Were None, Philip Lombart (2004)
- Hamlet, Player Queen (2005)
- Korikoribanashi (2006)
- Othello, Iago (2007)
- Genghis Khan, Title role (2008)
- Gabrielle Chanel (2009)
- The Film of the Nation, Gustav Friedrich (2011)
- Bouye (2011)
- Harvest, Albert (2012)
- Pygmalion, Dr. Higgins (2013)
- HInoyouni Sabishi Anegaite (2014)
- Tokaido Yotsuya Kaidan (2015)
- Kakuonnna (2016)
- Super Kabuki (2016–18)
- Otoko no Hanamichi (2017)
- Yukinojo Henge (2017)
- Phedre (2017)

== Awards and nominations ==
Award	Year	Category	Nominated work	Result	Ref.
Primetime Emmy Awards	2024	Outstanding Supporting Actor in a Drama Series	Shōgun	Nominated	
Gawad Urian Award	2025	Best Supporting Actor	Crosspoint	Nominated	
