= Liway =

2018 independent film by Kip Oebanda

- Film poster
- Directed by: Dakip "Kip" Oebanda
- Written by: Dakip "Kip" Oebanda; Zig Dulay
- Produced by: Alemberg Ang
- Starring: Glaiza de Castro; Kenken Nuyad; Dominic Roco; Sue Prado; Soliman Cruz
- Cinematography: Pong Ignacio; Bran Reluao
- Edited by: Chuck Gutierrez
- Music by: Nhick R. Pacis
- Release date: August 3, 2018 (Cinemalaya)
- Running time: 100 minutes
- Country: Philippines
- Language: Filipino

Liway is a 2018 Filipino independent film directed by Kip Oebanda from a screenplay he co-wrote with Zig Dulay. It about the experiences of Dakip, a young boy growing up in prison as the son of anti-Marcos dissident Cecilia Flores-Oebanda, better known as Commander Liway and referred to in the film by the vernacular endearment "Day", during the waning days of the Marcos dictatorship. The film is based on true events, with Glaiza de Castro playing the film's major lead.

The film was released on August 3, 2018, as part of the 14th Cinemalaya Independent Film Festival, where it received a special jury commendation and the audience choice award in the full-length feature film category.

During its run, the film was noted for bringing out strong emotional responses or reactions from its audiences. During its Cinemalaya screenings, filmgoers often spontaneously applauded the film during the end credits. In some instances, viewers chanted protest songs used in the film that originated during the Marcos era.

Along with Benedict Mique's ML, it was one of the two Cinemalaya 2018 films about martial law, continuing the tradition of 2017's Respeto in light of the 2016 burial of Ferdinand Marcos and the prominence of his wife Imelda Marcos and his children, Bongbong Marcos and Imee Marcos, in Philippine politics.

== Plot ==
Based on a true story and set in the waning days of the Marcos dictatorship, Liway is told from the point of view of Dakip, a boy living in a prison camp housing both criminals and members of the New People's Army. Even as conditions in the camp become progressively more difficult, his mother tries her best to shield him from the trauma of a political prisoner's life and to give him a normal life, telling him stories based on Philippine mythology and folklore. One of these stories is about Liway, the guardian diwata of Mount Kanlaon, a fictionalized version of her own story in the resistance against the Marcos dictatorship. As the dictatorship becomes more unstable and their lives become more uncertain, Dakip's mother has to weigh his best interests against the prospect of never seeing each other again.

== Cast ==
=== Main cast ===
- Kenken Nuyad as the film's point-of-view character, Dakip "Kip" Oebanda, the film's director, when he was a child.
- Glaiza de Castro as Ma. Cecilia Flores-Oebanda, better known as Commander Liway, and nicknamed "Day" (a vernacular endearment meaning "lady" or "miss") throughout the film.
- Dominic Roco as Ric, Day's husband and Kip's father, better known as Commander Toto.
- Soliman Cruz as the warden of the prison in which the Oebandas are held.
- Sue Prado as Pinang, another dissident imprisoned with the Oebandas.

=== Supporting cast ===
- Joel Sargo
- Paolul O'Harina
- Ubong Joson
- Nico Antonio
- Gerry Corneto
- Piana Alperez
- Julie Batista
- Don Benitoz
- Liway Sabong
- Sha Malala
- Renante Bustamante
- Madeleine Colas
- Don Perding
- Dengman
- Boy Golden
- Ben Tambling
- Khalil Ramos as Karl

== Production ==
=== Writing ===
Director Kip Oebanda says that Liway took seven months to write, which made it more difficult because so much of the story was personal to him. To ensure the story was "more universal" and less specific to a single person's perspective, he worked with co-writer Zig Dulay, who could be more detached from all the emotions Oebanda associated with the story.

Oebanda was aware that the film's events would be perceived as politically sensitive, because the adult protagonists in the story were part of the New People's Army. In an interview with CNN Philippines, he remarked:

"Some of the people from the left are asking me, 'Is this about the struggle? Is it about the NPA?' In parts it is, but that is a context of where this family came from more than it [is] the actual story... It's really just, how do you find and keep yourself resilient and hopeful even in a situation when you're in prison with your child?"

In an interview with the Manila Bulletin, he recounted that the response a Facebook post he shared in response to the 2016 burial of Ferdinand Marcos at the Philippines' Libingan ng mga Bayani (Cemetery of the Heroes) helped convince him of the need to tell the story of his childhood:

"I didn't judge any political figure, I did not praise or insult anyone in politics, I didn't pin the blame on anyone, I just said 'these are the facts, this is what happened.' It got massively shared, and what surprised me was, no one bashed me for it, I didn't get trolled or hated, not even by those who do not necessarily agree with my political leanings. And so I thought maybe this is the way to start the discourse with people who don't necessarily subscribe to your political views: Just give them facts, give them the stories of what really happened. Even some people who supported the regime were okay with it. They were willing to listen."

=== Casting and filming ===
Liway (2018)

In a Reddit AMA before the film's release, Kip Oebanda said that he sought out de Castro for the role, not knowing whether he would be lucky enough to get such a high-profile actress. Describing why he specifically thought de Castro was suited to the role, he remarked: " ...She has both the vulnerability and strength required by the character. Someone who is gentle and kind but is handed a very difficult lot in life, and found strength and hope. I wanted to have an empowered and empowering female character, which is what Commander Liway is in real life. And Glaiza manages that perfectly."

Shooting for the film proved physically demanding, especially flashback scenes which depicted the capture of Commander Liway and Commander Toto before their days in prison. These scenes were shot in the jungle, and de Castro had to rush between the set of Liway and the set of a television series she was doing simultaneously.

The actors, particularly de Castro, were originally apprehensive about inhabiting their roles because the people they were portraying were real people who were still alive. To make the actors more comfortable, Oebanda had to arrange for the actors to meet the actual people they were portraying. For de Castro, this meant a very emotional discussion with Oebanda's mother, Commander Liway herself.

== Music ==
De Castro, also an indie music artist, performed a cover of Philippine folk group Asin's song "Himig ng Pag-Ibig" as part of the film and its promotion. She had to learn and record the song in one day because the director wanted the performance to have "raw, unpracticed emotion".

== Reception ==
=== Audience reception ===
Public reaction to the film was strong, with audiences spontaneously applauding the film after screenings, and at least one screening erupting in various revolutionary chants which were used in the film but still used in contemporary protests, such as "Ang tao, ang bayan! Ngayon ay lumalaban!" (The people, the country! Are now fighting back!) and "Huwag matakot! Makibaka!" (Do not be afraid! Dare to struggle!)

In a tweet on August 4, 2018, the film's director reported:

"The cinema in Trinoma showing Liway erupted in spontaneous chants led by a guy at the back as the credits rolled: "Ang tao ang bayan!" then the audience answered "Ngayon ay Lumalaban!" "Huwag matakot! Makibaka!" It was a surreal experience. "

=== Critical response ===
Critical reviews of the film were quick to praise how it humanized the events of the Marcos dictatorship era and note its relevance in contemporary Philippine life.

Heinrich Domingo of Cinetactic noted:

"Liway is an important work of cinema, especially in these trying times. As the Marcos family and their cohorts spend millions to brainwash the general public, the film's director uses his personal narrative to tell a counter-story. Liway is an inspiration to fight back. It calls for resistance."

Rappler film critic Oggs Cruz said: "Kip Oebanda’s Liway is not just an elegant and rousing tribute of a son to his mother, it is also a testament to the importance of telling stories." He particularly praised the film's choice to focus on Dakip's point of view:

[Dakip']s concept of the world is limited to the curious mix of guards, criminals and rebels he interacts with and the stories they tell. Oebanda doesn't waste resources in highlighting the pleasure and delight Dakip exudes in every story he hears, with the film employing the simple spectacle of shadow puppets to convey childlike wonder to the audience. The film slowly but surely creeps towards more pertinent territories when the child becomes aware of the world beyond the prison, and the stories morphing from fables and fairy tales to very real experiences of strife, suffering and struggle.

Cruz compares the film to Oebanda's previous films Tumbang Preso (2014), Bar Boys (2017), and Nay (2017), saying that:

This time, there is a certain ease in the storytelling. It is as if the film is unburdened by a need to veil itself with unnecessary metaphors or trappings of sophistication. It is also sourced from a more personal space. It is perhaps because the narrative is structured much simpler, with the tall tales and the flashbacks occupying the same space as stories being told by character to character instead of being an arbitrary and convenient device. It helps that there is a softness to the visuals, a preference in depicting not the glaring atrocities of the times but the enduring humanity in the midst of all the suffering.

=== Accolades ===
Liway received a special jury commendation and the Audience Choice Award in the 2018 Cinemalaya Film Festival. Kenken also received a Special Jury Prize for his performance. The film also won the Best Picture, Best Screenplay, and Best Editing at the The EDDYS 2019. Glaiza de Castro won the Best Actress Award at the 37th Luna Awards.

== See also ==
- List of films about martial law under Ferdinand Marcos
- Timeline of the Marcos dictatorship
- List of torture methods used by the Marcos dictatorship
- Asin
- ML (film)
- Respeto
- Citizen Jake
- Panahon ng Halimaw (Season of the Devil)
- Unless the Water Is Safer than the Land (Musmos na Sumibol sa Gubat ng Digma)
