= Kiri Dalena =

Kiri Dalena is a visual artist, filmmaker and human rights activist who lives and works in the Philippines. Her work deals with issues of political and social injustice, drawing from events in Philippine history. Dalena's works utilise diverse media and expressive languages, evoking an imaginative force that challenges the "reality" viewers maintain in their consciousness, as well as the frameworks that shape the significance of her work.

== Work ==
=== Erased Slogans (2008) ===
Among Dalena's most recognized works is Erased Slogans, a series of photographic prints begun in 2008 that depicts protesters holding placards with their slogans digitally removed. Based on archival images of Manila protests in the 1970s during the Marcos regime, the series alludes to the silencing of voices of dissent as well as ongoing acts of protest in the region and across the globe. According to the artist, "the blank placards offer a silence that is necessary for reflection."

Red Book of Slogans (2008)

Red Book of Slogan is an adjoining work of the Erased Slogans. The ‘expunged’ and ‘censored’ slogans in Erased Slogans compiled into a 700-pages book, with one slogan per page. The form of Red Book of Slogans reminiscent of an expanded communist red book or a bible.

=== Southern Tagalog Exposure ===
Co-founded by Kiri Dalena with King Catoy in 2001, Southern Tagalog Exposure is a multimedia collective that focuses on producing and exhibiting digital video documentaries and audio-visual works that address socio-political concerns. The group "appropriates multimedia as medium to advance social change." In 2007, the collective in collaboration with the Free Jonas Burgos Movement made the short anthology documentary film Rights, in which Dalena directed two short films that are in the form of public service announcements.

== Exhibitions and accolades ==
In 2009, Dalena received an Ateneo Art Award for an installation artwork that appeared in the group exhibition Keeping the Faith at the Lopez Museum. The work, called Barricade, book of slogans, erased slogans, and isolation room, drew from images in the Lopez archive from the Martial Law period during the regime of Ferdinand Marcos. In 2012, Dalena was a recipient of the CCP 13 Artists Award. She has participated in group exhibitions at UP Vargas Museum, Ateneo Art Gallery, Lopez Memorial Museum, Museum of Contemporary Art & Design, Cultural Center of the Philippines, and Museum of Contemporary Art Tokyo. Her work has also been shown in international art events including the Singapore Biennale (2013), the Yokohama Triennial (2014), the Fukuoka Asian Art Triennial (2014), and the 8th Asia Pacific Triennial (2015).

== Museum collections ==
Dalena's works are in the permanent collections of the Singapore Art Museum, Queensland Art Gallery and Queensland Gallery of Modern Art, Ateneo Art Gallery, and M+ in Hong Kong's West Kowloon Cultural District.
