= 2018 Cinemalaya =

Film festival edition

14th Cinemalaya Independent Film Festival
- Official festival poster
- Opening film: BuyBust by Erik Matti
- Closing film: The Taste of Rice Flower by Peng Fei Song
- Location: Metro Manila, Philippines
- Film titles: 20
- Festival date: August 3, 2018–August 12, 2018
- Website: Official Website

Cinemalaya chronology
- 2019 2017

The 14th Cinemalaya Independent Film Festival was held from August 3–12, 2018 in Metro Manila, Philippines. A total of ten full-length features and ten short films competed. The festival was opened by Erik Matti's BuyBust and was closed by Peng Fei Song's The Taste of Rice Flower.

== Entries ==
The winning film is highlighted with boldface and a dagger.

=== Full-Length Features ===
| Title | Director | Cast | Genre |
|---|---|---|---|
| Distance | Perci Intalan | Iza Calzado, Nonie Buencamino and Therese Malvar | Family drama |
| **Kung Paano Hinihintay ang Dapithapon** ^{†} | Carlo Enciso Catu | Dante Rivero, Menggie Cobarrubias and Perla Bautista | Drama |
| Kuya Wes | James Robin Mayo | Ogie Alcasid and Ina Raymundo | Comedy, Drama |
| Liway | Kip Oebanda | Glaiza de Castro and Dominic Roco | Period drama |
| The Lookout | Afi Africa | Andres Vasquez, Yayo Aguila, Jay Garcia and Elle Ramirez | Action, Thriller |
| Mamang | Denise O'Hara | Celeste Legaspi and Ketchup Eusebio | Drama |
| ML | Benedict Mique, Jr. | Eddie Garcia and Tony Labrusca | Thriller |
| Musmos na Sumibol sa Gubat ng Digma | Iar Arondaing | Junayka Sigrid Santarin, JM Salvado and Star Orjaliza | Social drama |
| Pan de Salawal | Che Espiritu | Bodjie Pascua and Miel Espinosa | Family comedy |
| School Service | Louie Ignacio | Ai-Ai delas Alas and Joel Lamangan | Drama, Thriller |

=== Short films ===
| Title | Director |
|---|---|
| Si Astri maka Si Tambulah | Xeph Suarez |
| Babylon | Keith Deligero |
| **Jodilerks Dela Cruz, Employee of the Month** ^{†} | Carlo Francisco Manatad |
| Kiko | Jojo Driz |
| Logro | Kani Villaflor |
| Nangungupahan | Glenn Barit |
| Sa Saiyang Isla | Christian Candelaria |
| Siyudad sa Bulawan | Jarell Serencio |
| Yakap | Mika Fabella; Rafael Froilan |
| You, Me and Mr. Wiggles | Jav Velasco |

== Awards ==
The awards ceremony was held on August 12, 2018, at the Cultural Center of the Philippines.

=== Full-Length Features ===
- Best Film – Kung Paano Hinihintay Ang Dapithapon by Carlo Enciso Catu
  - Special Jury Prize – Pan de Salawal by Che Espiritu
  - Audience Choice Award – Liway by Kip Oebanda
- Best Direction – Che Espiritu for Pan de Salawal
- Best Actor – Eddie Garcia for ML
- Best Actress – Ai-ai delas Alas for School Service
- Best Supporting Actor – Ketchup Eusebio for Mamang
- Best Supporting Actress – Therese Malvar for Distance and School Service
- Best Screenplay – John Carlo Pacala for Kung Paano Hinihintay Ang Dapithapon
- Best Cinematography – Neil Daza for Kung Paano Hinihintay Ang Dapithapon
- Best Editing – Mikael Pestano for ML
- Best Sound – Wild Sound for Musmos na Sumibol sa Gubat ng Digma
- Best Original Music Score – Len Calvo for Pan de Salawal
- Best Production Design – Marielle Hizon for Kung Paano Hinihintay Ang Dapithapon
- NETPAC Award – Kung Paano Hinihintay Ang Dapithapon by Carlo Enciso Catu

=== Short films ===
- Best Short Film – Jodilerks dela Cruz: Employee of the Month by Carlo Francisco Manatad
  - Special Jury Prize – Si Astri Maka Si Tambulah by Xeph Suarez
  - Audience Choice Award – Kiko by Jojo Driz
- Best Direction – Xeph Suarez for Si Astri Maka Si Tambulah
- Best Screenplay – Christian Candelaria for Sa Saiyang Isla
- NETPAC Award – Sa Saiyang Isla by Christian Candelaria
