= Enzo Osorio =

Filipino actor

- Born: June 26, 2009 (age 17)
- Occupation: Actor
- Years active: 2013–present

Enzo Osorio (born June 26, 2009) is a Filipino child actor who won Best Actor in the 2024 Cinemalaya for his role in The Hearing.

== Career ==
Osorio started acting at age four, appearing in the 2014 television series Ilustrado. He also played a role in On the Wings of Love and Pulang Araw.

Osorio portrayed the role of Lucas in the 2024 Cinemalaya film, The Hearing. Lucas is a deaf and mute child who was sexually abused by a priest. He drew inspiration from the real experience of his mother who was also a victim of sexual abuse. Osorio won best actor for the role in the Cinemalaya Awards Night, becoming one of the youngest winners of the award at age 15.

He was also part of the cast for the 2024 Metro Manila Film Festival entry Green Bones.

== Personal life ==
Born on June 26, 2009, Osorio hails from Pandacan, Manila.
