= ML (film) =

- Directed by: Benedict Mique Jr.
- Written by: Benedict Mique Jr.
- Produced by: Roselle Lorenzo; Benedict Mique Jr.
- Starring: Eddie Garcia; Tony Labrusca
- Cinematography: Anne Monzon
- Edited by: Mikael Pestano
- Music by: Pearlsha Abubakar-Quebral
- Distributed by: Solar Pictures
- Release date: August 3, 2018 (Cinemalaya)
- Running time: 91 minutes
- Country: Philippines
- Language: Filipino

ML is a 2018 Philippine independent psychological horror film written, co-produced, and directed by Benedict Mique Jr., starring Eddie Garcia as a retired METROCOM Colonel suffering from Alzheimer's disease, leading him to believe that he is still living in the days of Ferdinand Marcos' dictatorship. He mistakes a visiting student, played by Tony Labrusca, as a dissident resisting Martial Law, and captures and tortures him, just as he did back in the 1970s. The film was released on August 3, 2018, at the 14th Cinemalaya Independent Film Festival.

Along with Kip Oebanda's Liway, it is one of two Cinemalaya 2018 films featuring social commentary about the martial law, continuing the tradition of 2017's Respeto in light of the 2016 burial of Ferdinand Marcos and the rise of his children Bongbong and Imee Marcos in Philippine politics.

== Plot ==
Carlo, a Marcos loyalist, interviews retired METROCOM Colonel Jose Z. Dela Cruz at his home about his experience and service under the Marcos regime during the martial law days for a school assignment. Unbeknownst to Carlo, the Colonel is delusional and psychopathic, believing that he is still an active-duty soldier in the dictatorship.

As Carlo starts interviewing the Colonel, he strikes Carlo unconscious. When Carlo wakes up, he finds himself strapped on a chair in the basement. Confused of what was happening, he demands to be cut loose by the Colonel but is only answered with physical battery. He is later tortured in numerous ways by the Colonel while asking him questions about his supposed links with a dissident movement. His best friend Jace and girlfriend Pat are later lured into the same basement through deceiving text messages. All three of them are tortured in front of each other. Both Carlo and Jace are beaten-up and electrocuted. Jace is water-boarded and later murdered by Russian roulette. Pat is stripped naked, tied up, burned with cigarettes on her private parts and sexually violated with a bottle.

Jace's corpse is dumped on a pavement and framed as a drug dealer in President Duterte's drug war. Carlo and Pat manage to escape the basement but are met at the doorstep by the Colonel, who is about to kill them before being distracted by a call, upon which the couple escape. They report their case to the police but the Colonel cleans his house of evidence, ensuring his acquittal. Hungry for justice, Carlo goes back to the Colonel's home one night to kill him, only to find that he has already died in his sleep. The Colonel is buried with honors at the Libingan ng mga Bayani (Cemetery of Heroes) as Carlo is asked regarding his assignment.

== Cast ==
- Eddie Garcia as Colonel dela Cruz
- Tony Labrusca as Carlo
- Lianne Valentin as Pat
- Henz Villaraiz as Jace
- Jojit Lorenzo
- Rafa Siguion-Reyna
- Chanel Latorre
- Chrome Cosio
- Jindric Macapagal

== See also ==
- List of films about martial law in the Philippines
- Philippine Constabulary Metropolitan Command
- 14th Cinemalaya Independent Film Festival
- Cinemalaya Independent Film Festival
- Liway
- Respeto
