= Mamay: A Journey to Greatness =

2024 Philippine biographical film

- Theatrical release poster
- Directed by: Neal Tan
- Screenplay by: Neal Tan
- Starring: Jeric Raval; Ara Mina; Victor Neri
- Cinematography: Gilbert Obispo
- Production company: Mamay Production
- Release date: August 27, 2024
- Country: Philippines

Mamay: A Journey to Greatness 'The Marcos Mamay Story' is a 2024 Philippine biographical film directed by Neal "Buboy" Tan. It tackles the biography of Nunungan mayor Marcos Mamay from his childhood to his experience as a politician.

== Cast ==
- Jeric Raval as Marcos Mamay, mayor of Nunungan, Lanao del Norte
  - Teejay Marquez as young Marcos Mamay
- Ara Mina as Hadja Alianur Mamay, Mamay's wife
- Victor Neri

== Production ==
The film was directed by Neal "Buboy" Tan and was produced under Mamay Production. Mamay Production is owned by Nunungan mayor Marcos Mamay, the primary subject matter of the biographical film. Mamay was also the assistant director making sure that the portrayal of Muslim culture and traditions were done accurately and with respect.

The film tackles various phases and aspects of Mamay's biography including his childhood and life as an honor student at Sapad Elementary School in Lanao del Norte and Kapatagan National High School, a business economics college student at the Mindanao State University, his unfulfilled dream to graduate from the Philippine Military Academy, and his political career. It also covered Mamay's involvement in family feuds and clan conflicts, his advocacy, and his romantic relationship with his eventual wife.

The film was filmed in Mamay's hometown of Nunungan. Several films were also filmed in Kapatagan, Iligan, Cagayan de Oro, Metro Manila, Baguio, and Dubai. The film reportedly took a year to complete.

== Release ==
Mamay premiered on August 27, 2024, at the SM Megamall.

== Accolades ==
Year	Award	Category	Recipient	Result
2025	73rd FAMAS Award	Best Picture	Mamay: A Journey to Greatness	Nominated
2025	73rd FAMAS Award	Best Actress	Ara Mina	Nominated
2025	73rd FAMAS Award	Best Supporting Actor	Jeric Raval	Won
2025	73rd FAMAS Award	Best Director	Neal Buboy Tan	Nominated
2025	73rd FAMAS Award	Best Screenplay	Neal Buboy Tan	Nominated
2025	73rd FAMAS Award	Best Production Design	Cyrus Khan	Won
2025	73rd FAMAS Award	Best Cinematography	Gilbert Obispo	Won
2025	73rd FAMAS Award	Best Musical Score	Mamay: A Journey to Greatness	Won
2025	73rd FAMAS Award	Best Sound	Mamay: A Journey to Greatness	Nominated
2025	73rd FAMAS Award	Best Original Song	"Hamon" by Gerald Santos, composed by Vehnee Saturno	Won
