= The Hearing (film) =

2024 drama film by Lawrence Fajardo

- Theatrical release poster
- Directed by: Lawrence Fajardo
- Screenplay by: Honee Alipio
- Produced by: Krisma Maclang Fajardo
- Starring: Enzo Osorio; Mylene Dizon; Nor Domingo; Ina Feleo
- Cinematography: Roberto Yñiguez
- Edited by: Lawrence Fajardo; Ysabelle Denoga
- Music by: Peter Joseph Legaste
- Production companies: Center Stage Productions; Pelikulaw
- Release date: August 2, 2024 (Cinemalaya)
- Running time: 100 minutes
- Country: Philippines
- Languages: Filipino; Sign language

The Hearing is a 2024 Philippine drama film directed and co-edited by Lawrence Fajardo from a screenplay by Honee Alipio. Starring Enzo Osorio, Mylene Dizon, Nor Domingo, and Ina Feleo, the story follows a couple who is suing a priest for sexually abusing their 12-year-old deaf-mute son.

Produced by Center Stage Productions and Pelikulaw, the film was theatrically released on August 2, 2024, as part of Cinemalaya.

== Cast ==
- Enzo Osorio as Lucas, a deaf and mute 12-year-old boy who was sexually abused by the town priest.; Osorio almost did not got the role. He learned of an audition for The Hearing while he is still in class. Upon the convincing of his mother, Osorio was allowed to leave school to audition. For the role, Osorio drew inspiration from his own's mother sexual abuse when she was a young girl. Osorio had to rely solely on facial expressions and sign language due to his character's disability.
- Mylene Dizon as Madonna, Lucas' mother; this is noted as Dizon's comeback in Cinemalaya since last appearing for Belle Douleur in 2019.
- Nor Domingo as Dante, Lucas father; in real life Domingo himself disclosed that "something horrible" happened to him as a teenager.
- Ina Feleo as Maya, a court interpreter who was involved in Lucas' legal case. Feleo in context of her role disclosed how she herself was a victim of sexual abuse at age 13, a trauma she processed during a workshop with Laurice Guillen when she was 21-years old already. For the role, Feleo had to learn sign language two to three days before filming and was aided by coaches on-set.
- Rom Factolerin as Fr. Mejor, the town priest
- Joel Torre as a lawyer.
- Rome Mallari as Jose Steffan, a relay interpreter; he is a deaf actor.

== Production ==
The Hearing was produced under Center Stage Productions and Pelikulaw with Lawrence Fajardo as director. Honee Alipio did the screenplay, Roberto Yñiguez was in charge of the Cinematography. Fajardo and Ysabelle Denoga were the editor. Peter Joseph Legaste created the original music score and Jannina Mikaela Minglanilla did the sound.

=== Theme ===
The idea to produce The Hearing bornes back in 2020 when Fajardo and Alipio were doing research related to persons with disabilities particularly dragon boat paddlers. Fajardo stumbled the concept of a court interpreter with the two interviewing one. They learned about rape cases involving deaf people which are often dismissed leading to the two to shelf their original pitch and make a film centering on a deaf boy instead.

Fajardo says the film was meant to spread awareness on the plight of the deaf community and the lack of sign language interpreters on courts which leads to the dismissal of cases involving deaf people. He also emphasized on how deaf children "are sexually abused in the Philippines regardless of their gender".

Subtitles were deliberately omitted for scenes involving sign languages.

=== Filming ===
Principal photography took place in Mauban, Quezon. It took seven days to finish. Some of the cast and crew members assisted in sign language during filming. This includes Eloi, a special education teacher and John Balliza, a teacher from De La Salle–College of Saint Benilde who guided the crew in the court scenes.

For the cinematography, the film was shot from the point-of-view of the characters with the final output having earth tones and with slight desaturation. The behavior of the characters was noted to be factor for the camera movements.

Filming was supposed to begin in January 2024 but was delayed due to funding issues.

== Release ==
The Hearing premiered at the 20th Cinemalaya which started on August 2, 2024.

== Accolades ==
Accolades received by Green Bones
Year	Award	Category	Recipient(s)	Result	Ref.
2024	20th Cinemalaya	Best Actor	Enzo Osorio	Won	
2025	41st Star Awards	Indie Movie Musical Scorer of the Year	Peter Joseph Legaste; Joaquin Santos	Nominated	
