= Phantosmia (film) =

2024 film by Lav Diaz

- Promotional poster
- Directed by: Lav Diaz
- Written by: Lav Diaz
- Produced by: Paul Soriano; Mark Victor; Lav Diaz
- Starring: Ronnie Lazaro; Janine Gutierrez; Paul Jake Paule; Hazel Orencio
- Cinematography: Lav Diaz
- Edited by: Lav Diaz
- Production companies: Black Cap Pictures; TEN17P; Sine Olivia Pilipinas
- Distributed by: Diversion
- Release date: 2 September 2024 (Venice)
- Running time: 246 minutes
- Country: Philippines
- Language: Filipino

Phantosmia is a 2024 Philippine psychological drama film written, co-produced, photographed, edited, and directed by Lav Diaz. It stars Ronnie Lazaro, Janine Gutierrez, Paul Jake Paule, and Hazel Orencio.

The film had its world premiere out of competition of the 81st Venice International Film Festival on 2 September 2024.

== Plot ==
In late-1970s Philippines, Hilarion Zabala, a highly decorated and retired Master Sergeant and family man, starts feeling that everything smells bad around his house. After pest control fails to identify a source for the odor, he visits Dr. Corazon Valle. There, Zabala recounts his time in the military as a Scout Ranger and describes how this condition first affected him shortly following his participation in a deadly mission, for which he had to bury many bodies, and has since returned intermittently. Valle suspects he is suffering from phantosmia and begins counseling. However, when Zabala complains of worsening symptoms, Valle proposes the radical approach of “reimmersion” where Zabala has to return to military employment in some capacity, believing that his physical presence in a military setting will help to clarify his troubled memories of service.

Zabala accepts and assumes the position of a cook for local prison inmates, a role he performs well in. However, one day, he is intrigued by a hiring notice for a guard to supervise the rear of the penal colony on the remote Pulo Island and applies. He is hired and upon arrival, greeted enthusiastically by overseer Major Ramon Lukas, who reluctantly complies with Zabala’s unexplained request to be stationed alone at his post, with no companion to relieve him.

During the day, Zabala surveys the colony, watching the prisoners as they farm and listening to Lukas’ broadcasts over the loudspeaker. He also begins observing those outside of the colony and taking an interest in the lives of a family that owns a restaurant very close to his post. He soon discovers that the family consists of 1) Narda, the matriarch; 2) Setong, her adopted son; 3) Reyna, her adopted daughter, Setong’s biological sister, and forcibly prostituted by Narda. Going by the rules, Zabala disapproves of how close the restaurant is to his post as well as the selling of alcohol and existence of prostitution in the area, but fails to enact meaningful change because his colleagues choose to turn a blind eye. At night, Zabala begins reflecting upon his life in a journal given to him by Valle.

Displeased with Zabala’s strict enforcement of rules, Narda pays a visit to Lukas, who encourages her to work with Zabala and persuades her to make himself Reyna’s exclusive client. When Setong accompanies Reyna to Lukas’, Zabala tails her. One day, Zabala meets Maku, a resident on nearby Dugong Island who travels by boat to purchase groceries from Narda, and the two form a connection.

Some time later, hunters arrive in the area to spend the following month hunting the Haring Musang, a mythical boar-like creature that has obsessed locals, including Lukas’ father, dining at Narda’s and camping uncomfortably close to Zabala’s post. To maintain appearances, Narda halts Reyna’s prostitution. After a hunter falls off of a cliff, Zabala organizes the rescue effort, but to no avail. The others soon leave, without having hunted down the beast. Reflecting in his journal upon the death within the context of his career as a killer, Zabala seeks to give meaning to his life.

When Reyna’s prostitution is resumed, Zabala confronts her and Setong, telling them that what they are engaging in is wrong and proposing to let Maku help them escape the island via his boat. Reyna agrees, so Zabala arranges for her to hide with Maku in a discreet part of the forest. However, Setong refuses and returns to Narda, lying that Reyna had escaped when he was taking a nap. Narda viciously beats him and forces him to inform Lukas. Enraged, Lukas orders Zabala to accompany him on a trip to hunt down both the Haring Musang and Reyna.

That night, Lukas independently wanders around the forest, futilely calling attention to the beast and Reyna, while Zabala remains by their campfire. The next morning, returning to their campsite after delivering his morning broadcast, Lukas is shot by Zabala, a decision he rationalizes as being necessary for victims like Reyna to escape, even though he believes that it is never anyone’s duty to kill. Using a previously agreed-upon signal, Zabala communicates with Maku and Reyna, who leave the island by traveling down a river in Maku’s boat.

== Cast ==
- Ronnie Lazaro as Hilarion Zabala
- Janine Gutierrez as Reyna
- Paul Jake Paule as Major Lukas
- Hazel Orencio as Narda
- Arjay Babon as Setong
- Dong Abay as Marlo
- Allen Alzola as Laban
- Heart Puyong as Nika
- Mitzi Comia as Brando
- Vince Macapobre as Michael
- Toni Go as Aling
- Lhorvie Nuevo as Dr. Valle
- Edrick Alcontado as Nelson

== Production ==
The film was shot in Sampaloc, Quezon.

== Release ==
The trailer was released on 19 August 2024. The film premiered at the 81st Venice International Film Festival on 2 September 2024.

== Reception ==
Diego Batlle of Otros Cines gave the film three out of five stars, writing, "...Phantosmia demands patience and concentration from the viewer; thus, when one immerses oneself in the universe proposed by Lav Diaz we are transported to a time, a place and some very particular and at times fascinating characters."

Hector A. Gonzalez of Loud and Clear Reviews gave the film two-and-a-half stars out of five, writing that Lav Diaz's Phantosmia hypnotizes viewers in the first half only to remove them from the experience in the second with a weak, laborious structure.
