= Jeric Raval =

Filipino actor

- Born: Ricardo Baluyut Buensuceso; 1961 (age 64–65)
- Occupation: Actor
- Years active: 1992–present
- Spouse: Holiday Buensuceso (m. 1991)
- Children: 18 (4 with Holiday)

Ricardo Baluyut Buensuceso (born 1961), known professionally as Jeric Raval, is a Filipino film and television actor. He was known for his role as an action star in the 1990s.

== Career ==
=== 1990s: as a young action film actor ===
Jeric Raval originally auditioned to become rapper for OctoArts Films in 1990. Instead he was encouraged to become an actor instead by Willy Milan.

With Milan, Raval reached out to other film studios. The outfits suggests Raval should be cast in an antagonistic role which Milan rejected as it would limit Raval's popularity as an actor.

Raval returned to OctoArts and made his debut in the 1992 film Primitivo 'Ebok' Ala which was directed by Junn P. Cabreira. He had a lead role on his very first film. This was followed by Valentin Zapanta: Alyas Ninong which starred Eddie Garcia and Estribo Gang: The Jinggoy Sese Story.

He was known during this period for the appearing in action films. Already an adult in his late 20s. Raval was marketed as a young actor at least 18 years of age. Monica Herrera was also often his leading actress in his films. His marriage with his actual wife was concealed as part of his contract.

In 1997, the demand for action films began to decline. After almost two decades from his acting debut, he retreated from mainstream entertainment industry. He engaged buy and sell business and became a construction supplies contractor. He still appeared in indie action films.

=== Return: 2010s ===
In 2014, Raval returned to the mainstream guesting at Maalaala Mo Kaya.

Raval joined Viva Films and acted in the 2015 Metro Manila Film Festival (MMFF) entry Manila's Finest, He also appeared in ABS-CBN television series Magpahanggang Wakas, We Will Survive, Ang Probinsyano and Kapamilya, Deal or No Deal.

Raval acted in the 2017 films Double Barrel and Ang Panday, the latter being a 2017 MMFF entry.

His career was distrupted by the COVID-19 pandemic.

Jeric Raval acted as Nunungan mayor Mamay Marcos in the 2024 biographical film Mamay: A Journey to Greatness. He won the best supporting actor honor in the 2025 FAMAS Awards. He was not eligible for the main best actor award since younger Marcos portrayed by another actor had more screentime in the film

== Personal life ==
Jeric Raval was born as Ricardo Baluyut Buensuceso in 1961.

Raval married Holiday Buensuceso on May 20, 1991. Holiday was his childhood friend, dating her from 1987 to 1990. He kept his marriage a secret due to contractual obligations with OctoArts Films. He has 14 other children with other women. This includes Monica Herrera who gave birth to three of his 18 children.
