= Crosspoint (film) =

2024 Philippine-Japanese film by Donie Ordiales

- Theatrical release poster

Japanese name
- Kanji: クロスポイント
Transcriptions
- Revised Hepburn: Kurosupointo
- Directed by: Donie Ordiales
- Screenplay by: Adam Luff; Tommy Shoes Morrison
- Story by: Donie Ordiales
- Produced by: Rav Bracero; Sho Ikushima
- Starring: Carlo Aquino; Takehiro Hira
- Cinematography: Hans Bobanovits
- Edited by: Apollo Jon Trinidad
- Music by: Jean-Paul Verona
- Production companies: High Road Creatives; 034 Productions; Storiesbound
- Distributed by: Buffalo 8; Fire and Ice Entertainment
- Release dates: 16 October 2024 (Philippines); 24 May 2025 (Japan)
- Running time: 95 minutes
- Countries: Philippines; Japan
- Languages: Filipino; English; Japanese

Crosspoint (Japanese: クロスポイント, Hepburn: Kurosupointo) is a 2024 Philippine-Japanese action thriller film written and directed by Donie Ordiales, with the screenplay written by Adam Luff and Tommy Shoes Morrison. The film stars Filipino actor Carlo Aquino and Emmy-nominated Japanese actor Takehiro Hira as the two men who started a manhunt for a wanted serial killer whose bounty will be the solution to their respective financial struggles.

A Philippine-Japanese collaboration film, produced by High Road Creatives and 034 Productions, was theatrically released in the Philippines on 16 October 2024 and in Japan on 24 May 2025.

== Synopsis ==
A struggling Filipino entertainer and a bankrupt Japanese business professional join forces to capture the wanted serial killer whose bounty is estimated to be 10 million yen.

== Cast ==
=== Primary cast ===
- Carlo Aquino as Manuel Hidalgo, a struggling Filipino entertainer who used to be a very well-known actor in the Philippines
- Takehiro Hira as Shigeru Yamaguchi, a Japanese business professional who was declared bankrupt
- Sho Ikushima as Tatsuya Aso
- Kei Kurosawa as Mayuko Yamaguchi
- Sarah Jane Abad as Melanie Hidalgo
- Dindo Arroyo as Frank Hidalgo
- Ian De Leon as Alvin
- Rie Shibata as Yuriko
- Ken Yamamura as Souta Kamimura

=== Supporting and other cast ===
- Natsuki Kunimoto as Hiromi (Alvin's wife)
- Aoi Okuyama as Risako Ohara
- Anam Sekiguchi as Police Officer 1
- Polo Ravales as Toto
- Misa Shimizu as Michiko Ohara
- Stefanie Arianne as Jessica
- Zeppi Borromeo as Oliver
- Maria Theresa Gow as Janice
- Danny "Brownie" Punzalan as Security Guard
- Chris Lamatsch as Yua's father
- Seira Kojima as Female Detective
- Miyabi Koteyama as Philippine Pub customer
- Burger Hasegawa as Yasuhiro
- Marlene Dela Peña as Mama Cherry
- Hirota Ōtsuka as Male Detective
- Shohei Muroya as Thug 1
- Tetsuji Muraoka as Uotani
- Osamu Narimatsu as Nagai
- Yuuki Ikushima as Suzuki

== Development ==
Shot mostly in Japan, the film Crosspoint was written and directed by Japan-based Filipino director Donie Ordiales from a story he wrote years earlier. The film was originally going to be a low-budget independent film but this was changed when ABS-CBN exclusive actor, Carlo Aquino, joined the project and made it into his first feature-length film. According to Ordiales, the characters in the movie were based on and inspired by the people he met in Japan.

Carlo Aquino, who was known for being a usual actor in family dramas and romantic comedies and being a fan of the Bourne film series, landed the role of Manuel Hidalgo when they informed that the project would contain suspense, action, and drama. Aquino's landing on the role of a washed-up Filipino actor-turned-entertainer in Japan is also attributed when his friend Zeppi Borromeo, who plays Oliver, recommended him to the production team.

== Reception ==
The film received a review score of 67/100 from 8 reviews according to review aggregator website Kritikultura, indicating a generally positive reception.
