= Alipato at Muog =

2024 Philippine documentary film

- Theatrical release poster
- Directed by: JL Burgos
- Written by: JL Burgos; Bernardine De Belen
- Produced by: Pulang Langgam Media Productions
- Cinematography: JL Burgos
- Edited by: JL Burgos
- Music by: Bong Ramilo
- Distributed by: GMA Public Affairs through GMA Pictures
- Release date: August 2, 2024 (Cinemalaya)
- Running time: 96 minutes
- Country: Philippines
- Language: Filipino

Alipato at Muog (English: Flying Embers and a Fortress) is a 2024 Philippine independent documentary film revolving around activist Jonas Burgos who was forcibly disappeared by suspected military personnel in 2007. Burgos was a member of the Peasant Alliance of Bulacan, the Peasant Movement of the Philippines and an activist for farmers’ rights. He helped farmers organize to reclaim their land. Written, shot, edited and directed by JL Burgos, Jonas's brother, the film premiered at the 2024 Cinemalaya Philippine Independent Film Festival on August 2, 2024. The film was produced by Pulang Langgam Media Productions and distributed by GMA Public Affairs for GMA Pictures.

Alipato at Muog was initially given a controversial "X" rating by the Movie and Television Review and Classification Board (MTRCB) for "undermin[ing] the faith and confidence of the people in their government", but was lowered down to an R-16 after protests and an appeal from Burgos. It was nominated for six awards at the 73rd FAMAS Awards, winning Best Picture and Best Director.

== Production ==
Alipato at Muog is about activist Jonas Burgos who was abducted at the Ever Gotesco Commonwealth shopping mall in Quezon City by suspected military personnel on April 28, 2007. It was during the presidency of Gloria Macapagal Arroyo. Jonas was the son of press freedom advocate Joe Burgos who was known for his work during the martial law era under President Ferdinand Marcos. The film also depicts the search of the missing Burgos.

Jonas' younger brother JL Burgos is the director of the film. Work on Alipato at Muog began as soon as Jonas' disappearance was announced by the Burgoses. A mixture of materials including old mini DVD tapes, HD, and 4k footage were used for the documentary film. The release of the film was held off due to the Burgos family's hope on a positive development regarding Jonas Burgos' disappearance case.

The documentary genre was chosen due to being cost effective. The film was distributed by GMA Public Affairs for GMA Pictures.

== Release ==
Alipato at Muog was shown at the 20th Cinemalaya Philippine Independent Film Festival which ran from August 2 to 11, 2024. The film was self-rated as Parental Guidance for the Cinemalaya release.

According to GMA Pictures, the film was initially given an "X" rating by three members of the Movie and Television Review and Classification Board (MTRCB) on August 22, 2024 for the reason that it would "undermine the faith and confidence of the people in their government and/or duly-constituted authorities". The three MTRCB members who decided on the rating were listed as Fernando Prieto, Glenn Patricio and Jose Alberto V.

The rating would have prohibited future commercial public releases in the Philippines. The film was eventually re-rated as "R-16" on September 5 after a formal appeal and protests by JL Burgos and various activists at the MTRCB office. The "X" rating was condemned as censorship.

== Accolades ==
The film was given the Special Jury Prize at the awarding ceremony of the 20th Cinemalaya Philippine Independent Film Festival. In 2025, the film was nominated for six awards at the 73rd FAMAS Awards: Best Picture, Best Director, Best Screenplay, Best Editing, Best Visual Effects, and Best Sound. The film ultimately won the awards for Best Picture as well as Best Director for JL Burgos on August 22, 2025, exactly a year from when the initial "X" rating was given by the MTRCB.

== See also ==
- Rights (film), a 2007 short anthology film also produced in response to Jonas Burgos' disappearance and given an initial "X" rating by the MTRCB
