= Bar Boys =

2017 Filipino comedy-drama film by Kip Oebanda

- Theatrical release poster
- Directed by: Kip Oebanda
- Written by: Kip Oebanda
- Produced by: Kip Oebanda; Vanessa Ulgado; Kevin Kho; Gavin Kho
- Starring: Carlo Aquino; Rocco Nacino; Enzo Pineda; Kean Cipriano; Odette Khan
- Cinematography: Sasha Palomares
- Edited by: Jeremiah "JD" Domingo
- Music by: Bryan Dumaguina
- Production companies: TropicFrills Film Productions; Wildsound Studios
- Distributed by: Quantum Films
- Release date: August 16, 2017
- Running time: 110 minutes
- Country: Philippines
- Languages: Filipino; English

Bar Boys is a 2017 Philippine comedy drama film written, co-produced, and directed by Kip Oebanda. The film stars Carlo Aquino, Rocco Nacino, Enzo Pineda and Kean Cipriano, and revolves around a group of friends who will try their best to become aspiring lawyers in a law school.

Produced by TropicFrills Film Productions, in cooperation with Wildsound Studios, and distributed by Quantum Films, it was released on August 16, 2017, as one of the official entries for the Pista ng Pelikulang Pilipino. Bar Boys was adapted into a musical in 2024. A sequel, Bar Boys: After School, was released in 2025.

== Plot ==
A group of friends consisting of legal management graduates Christian Carlson, Erik Vicencio, Joshua Zuniga, and Torran Garcia, play League of Legends in an internet café and later check the results of their law school entrance examination. Erik, Christian, and Torran manage to pass, while Joshua fails. Joshua says that he never truly wanted to be a lawyer, and only pursued legal management due to his parents' wishes.

Torran, from a middle-class family of seven, had his parents invite neighbors to show support for his education, aiming to make a name for the family. Erik comes from a working-class family whose father, an aging retired cop now working as a security guard, hopes the law degree will lift them out of poverty, while his mother worries about the expensive law school tuition. Christian, from a wealthy family, could attend an Ivy League university in the U.S., but chooses to study law in the Philippines to be closer to his girlfriend Rachel, a decision his Filipino-American father Maurice is unaware of until he stumbles upon both of them during a surprise visit. Christian lies by promising to break up with Rachel to focus on his studies, keeping her hidden from online calls to his father.

The trio begins their law school journey, facing various challenges. In their first class, they meet Atty. Victor Cruz, a young gay lawyer who taught them the importance of specificity. Torran is invited to join Alpha Beta Gamma, an elite law school fraternity, and hooks up with one of his classmates during a frat party. However, he faces a moral dilemma when he witnesses fraternity abuse and struggles whether to report it or protect his status. Meanwhile, Erik's father suffers a stroke, forcing Erik to balance his studies, work, and caregiving duties. Tired of years of being neglected by Christian who refuses to stand up to his father, Rachel breaks up with Christian.

As the trio reaches their senior year, one of their most challenging classes is taught by the strict Deputy Dean, retired Supreme Court Associate Justice Hernandez, who demands precise answers. In one class, she emphasizes the seriousness of studying law and shares a pro bono case she's handling involving land titles and the generational oppression of farmers.

Months before graduation, Hernandez reveals that the dean had asked her to choose between a curve or a cut-off for grading. She chooses the curve, and announces that Christian earned a perfect 1.0. They were then warned that more students would be at risk of failing because of this. She gives Christian the choice to keep his grade or lower it to help classmates, including Erik, who risks not graduating if he fails the class. This leads to an argument among the trio, as Christian risks losing his honors title if he lowers his grade. Torran and Christian, believing in Erik, each resolve to convince Hernandez to help him. Touched by their persistence, Hernandez relented, choosing a cut-off over the curve, allowing Erik to pass and qualify for graduation.

During the bar exams, Christian found the test easy, while Torran struggled with labor law. Erik, grieving his father's recent death, was uncertain of his answers. When the results were released, Torran pranks his family into thinking he failed, bringing them joy. Erik fails, while Christian emerges as a bar topnotcher. Christian rekindles his relationship with Rachel. Joshua reunites with the trio, and Christian offers a portion of Joshua's income as an actor to Erik, but he declines. Joshua insists Erik keep the money as condolence. Later, Erik meets with Hernandez, who reveals that he's considering not retaking the bar and pursuing business or a call-center job instead. Hernandez supports his decision but encourages him to try again, revealing Christian and Torran's efforts to convince her to believe in him.

Years later, Joshua has become a successful actor, while Erik ranked ninth in his second take of the bar exam. Now married with children to Rachel, Christian calls up Joshua, before heading to the courthouse library, where he reunites with Torran and Erik. Torran and Christian reveal that they coached Erik for his bar exam retake. They then enter the courtroom, ready for their session as Erik and Torran represent two opposing parties.

== Cast ==
- Carlo Aquino as Erik Vicencio
- Rocco Nacino as Torran Garcia
- Enzo Pineda as Christian Carlson
- Kean Cipriano as Joshua Zuniga
- Sebastian Castro as Atty. Victor Cruz, one of the group's professors in their freshman year who is openly gay
- Odette Khan as Justice Hernandez, a retired court Justice and one the group's strict professors in their senior year
- Maey Bautista as Atty. Formilleza, one of the group's professors
- Anna Luna as Rachel, Christian's girlfriend
- Rener Concepcion as Renato Vicencio, Erik's father
- Irene Celebre as Linda Vicencio, Erik's mother
- Vance Larena as Lord Master, the head of Alpha Beta Gamma, Torran's fraternity
- Pontri Bernardo as Atty. Maurice Carlson, Christian's Filipino-American father
- Hazel Faith Dela Cruz as Alice, Torran's classmate whom he hooks up with

== Production ==
Bar Boys was produced under TropicFrills Film Productions in cooperation with Wildsound Studios. It was directed and written by Kip Oebanda. The concept for the film was created when Oebanda was watching Pridyider with a lawyer friend who described to him that law school is the "ultimate horror film". Oebanda presented the idea for the film at the 2014 Film Financing Forum. This led to Oebanda researching on law schools and its culture, law students and instructors and even the concept of friendship.

The role of Justice Hernandez was originally offered to Senator Miriam Defensor Santiago, who initially accepted only to drop out due to her 2016 presidential campaign conflicting with the production schedule. Khan, who ultimately landed the role, cited Santiago as her inspiration after Oebanda informed her that she would be portraying the late senator.

He describes the film as a "love story" saying that friendship is a "form of love". He says that the characters in the film went through conflicts that made them make tough decisions and was asked to pick between friendship or personal success. The film was produced by Vanessa Ulgado.

The film received support from the SM Foundation. Principal photography for Bar Boys was made in 2015, and additional shots were made the following year. Most of the school scenes, including the library and classrooms, were filmed in San Beda College (now San Beda University), while scenes depicting the bar operations of different law schools were actual footage of the 2015 bar examinations at the University of Santo Tomas (UST). However, as filming inside UST, the venue for the bar examinations, was prohibited for security reasons, scenes of law graduates taking the bar examinations were instead filmed in another portion of San Beda College.

== Release ==
The film, distributed by Quantum Films, made its theatrical debut on August 16, 2017, as one of the twelve official entries at the 2017 Pista ng Pelikulang Pilipino.

== Sequel ==
A sequel title Bar Boys: After School has been in development since October 4, 2024.

== Stage adaptation ==
The film was adapted into a stage musical by Barefoot Theatre Collaborative, premiering in 2024. The musical follows the same story of three friends navigating law school while one pursues a different path and features a total of 20 songs. It had a limited run before the end of the year. In 2025, the show returned with an all-new staging, featuring updated direction, design, and performances. Reviews praised the production for its storytelling and performances.

== Reception ==
=== Critical response ===
The Cinema Evaluation Board gave Bar Boys an "A" rating. Writer-director Erik Matti described the film as "nostalgic and sentimental", saying that Bar Boys reminded him of Maryo J. de los Reyes's Bagets and Jake Tordesillas's High School Circa '65. He also praised the performance of the lead actors as well as the "nuanced detail on the inner workings of making it to law school" as depicted in the film.

=== Accolades ===
Award	Date of ceremony	Category	Recipient	Result	Ref.
FAMAS Awards	June 10, 2018	Best Supporting Actress	Odette Khan	Won	
Gawad Urian Awards	June 14, 2018	Best Supporting Actress	Odette Khan	Won	
Gawad Urian Awards	June 14, 2018	Best Screenplay	Kip Oebanda	Nominated	
PMPC Star Awards for Movies	February 18, 2018	Movie Supporting Actress of the Year	Odette Khan	Won	
PMPC Star Awards for Movies	February 18, 2018	Indie Movie of the Year	Bar Boys	Nominated	
PMPC Star Awards for Movies	February 18, 2018	Indie Movie Director of the Year	Kip Oebanda	Nominated	
PMPC Star Awards for Movies	February 18, 2018	Indie Movie Screenwriter of the Year	Kip Oebanda	Nominated	
PMPC Star Awards for Movies	February 18, 2018	Indie Movie Production Designer of the Year	Aped Santos	Nominated	
PMPC Star Awards for Movies	February 18, 2018	Indie Movie Editor of the Year	JD Domingo	Nominated	
PMPC Star Awards for Movies	February 18, 2018	Indie Movie Musical Scorer of the Year	Alyana Cabral	Nominated	
