= Zig Dulay =

Filipino television and film director

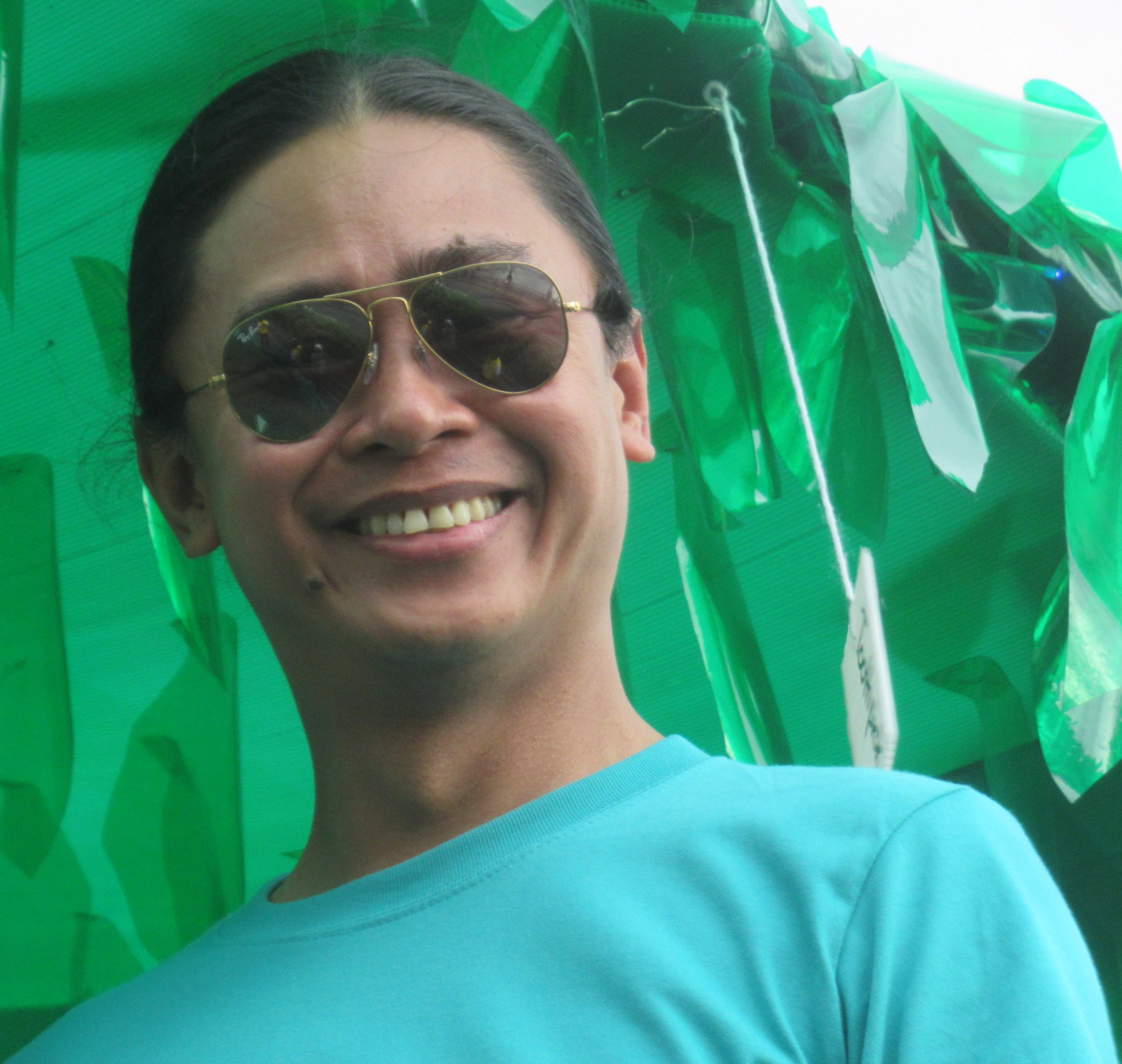
- Dulay at the 2024 Metro Manila Film Festival Parade of Stars
- Born: Zig Madamba Dulay; January 2, 1987 (age 39); Santiago, Isabela, Philippines
- Education: University of the Philippines Baguio (BA); University of the Philippines Diliman (MA)
- Occupations: Film Director; Screenwriter; Film Editor; Producer; Cinematographer; Television Director
- Years active: 2009–present
- Employer: GMA Network
- Notable work: Maria Clara at Ibarra (2022); Firefly (2023); Green Bones (2024)
- Awards: TOYM 2024

Zig Madamba Dulay (born January 2, 1987) is a Filipino independent filmmaker, TV director, producer, screen writer, film editor and cinematographer. He is known for directing and writing several acclaimed Indie films such as The Bit Player, Black Rainbow, Missing, Bambanti and Bagahe. Dulay has directed and written several television series for GMA Network, where he serves as one of the head-writers and resident director. He has gained nationwide recognition after directing a fantasy drama series Maria Clara at Ibarra and the award-winning movies Firefly and Green Bones.

== Early life and education ==
Zig Madamba Dulay was born on January 2, 1987, in Santiago, Isabela, to a family of farmers. He is the 10th of 11 siblings. He pursued college as a scholar at the University of the Philippines Baguio and earned his degree in Communication, majoring in Journalism. He later obtained his Master of Arts in Creative Writing and Film from the University of the Philippines Diliman.

During his stay in UP Diliman, he became a protégé of script writer and director Armando "Bing" Lao, the founder of Found Story scriptwriting workshops. Dulay credited all his achievements to his late mentor.

== Career ==
=== Early work (2011–2021) ===
Dulay began his career in the entertainment industry in 2009. In 2014, he worked as a co-director for the television series Sa Puso ni Dok.

=== Breakthrough in television (2022) ===
At the age of 36, Zig Dulay achieved significant recognition when he became the director of the Philippine television historical drama portal fantasy series Maria Clara at Ibarra.

In February, Dulay was invited as International Jury member at the 28th Vesoul International Film Festival in France. By September 2022, He presided as one of the jurors of Pista ng Pelikulang Pilipino (PPP) for Sine ng Kabataan.

=== Recent work and recognition (2023–present) ===
Following his success with Maria Clara at Ibarra, Dulay directed the award-winning film Firefly in 2023. In recognition of his contributions to Philippine cinema and television, he was named among The Outstanding Young Men (TOYM) 2024 in the Culture and Arts: TV and Film category.

Dulay served as Jury member at the 2023 Kaş International Film Festival in Turkey.

In 2024, Dulay was member of the jury panel for Narrative Film Feature at the 19th Harlem International Film Festival in New York, USA.

== Filmography ==
=== Film ===
| Year | Title | Credited as | | | | Notes |
| Year | Title | Director | Screen writer | Editor | Producer | Notes |
|---|---|---|---|---|---|---|
| 2009 | Sa Paglaya ng aking Salita | Yes | Yes | No | No | |
| 2009 | Latak or Residue | Assistant Director | No | No | No | |
| 2010 | Boy Toys | Assistant Director | No | No | No | |
| 2010 | Magkakapatid | No | No | No | No | Casting director |
| 2011 | The Last Day in Baguio | Yes | Yes | Yes | No | Cinematographer |
| 2011 | The Natural Phenomenon of Madness | No | No | No | No | Cinematographer |
| 2012 | Qwerty | No | Yes | No | Yes | Line Producer and casting director |
| 2012 | Posas or Shackled | Assistant Director | Story | No | No | Story and screenwriter |
| 2012 | Ag Ignorantiam | No | Yes | No | No | |
| 2012 | Crossroads | No | Yes | No | No | |
| 2012 | The Strangers | First Assistant Director | No | No | No | |
| 2013 | The Bit Player or Ekstra | No | Story | Yes | No | Story and screen play (shared with Antoinette Jadaone and Jeffrey Jeturian) |
| 2013 | Missing | Yes | Yes | Yes | Executive | |
| 2013 | Philippino Story | First Assistant Director | Yes | No | No | |
| 2014 | Unfriend | No | Yes | No | No | |
| 2014 | Senior | No | No | Yes | No | |
| 2014 | The Commitment | No | Yes | Yes | Yes | Co-producer |
| 2014 | M: Mother's Maiden Name | Yes | Yes | No | No | |
| 2015 | Bambanti | Yes | Yes | Yes | No | |
| 2016 | Paglipay | Yes | Yes | Yes | Yes | |
| 2016 | T.P.O | No | No | No | Yes | Co-producer |
| 2017 | Bagahe | Yes | Yes | Yes | Executive | Screen play (shared with Mikhail Red and Rae Red) |
| 2017 | Neomanila | No | Yes | No | No | |
| 2018 | Liway | No | Yes | No | No | Screen play (shared with Kip Oebanda) |
| 2019 | Ang Aking Korona | Yes | Yes | No | No | |
| 2019 | Children of the River | No | No | Yes | No | |
| 2021 | Black Rainbow | Yes | Yes | Yes | Yes | Co-producer and acting workshop facilitator |
| 2022 | The Baseball Player | No | No | Yes | No | |
| 2023 | Firefly | Yes | No | No | No | |
| 2024 | A Lab Story | No | No | No | No | Creative consultant |
| 2024 | Green Bones | Yes | No | No | No | |
| 2025 | Bar Boys: After School | No | Yes | No | No | Screen play with Kip Oebanda & Carlo Enciso Catu |

=== Television ===
| Year | Title | Role | Notes | Ref. |
|---|---|---|---|---|
| 2013—2018 | Wagas | Director and Screen writer | | |
| 2014 | Sa Puso ni Dok | Director and Screen writer | | |
| 2014 | Elemento | Screen writer | | |
| 2015—2016 | Dangwa | Director and screen writer | | |
| 2016 | Naku, Boss Ko! | Screen writer | | |
| 2016 | Conan, My Beautician | Head writer | | |
| 2015—2017 | Karelasyon | Director and screen writer | | |
| 2017 | D' Originals | Second-unit assistant director | | |
| 2018 | Sirkus | Director and head writer | | |
| 2018 | Inday Will Always Love You | Head-writer | | |
| 2018—2019 | Tadhana | Director and head writer | | |
| 2019 | Sahaya | Director | | |
| 2020 | I Can See You | Director | | |
| 2020 | Project Destination | Director | | |
| 2021 | My Fantastic Pag-ibig | Director | | |
| 2021 | Legal Wives | Director | | |
| 2019—2022 | Magpakailanman | Director | | |
| 2021—2022 | Stories from the Heart | Director | | |
| 2022—2023 | Maria Clara at Ibarra | Director | | |
| 2024 | My Guardian Alien | Director | | |
| 2024—2025 | Widows' War | Director | | |
| 2026 | Whispers from Heaven | Director | | |

== Awards and recognition ==
=== International awards ===
Awards and nominations received by Zig Dulay
International Awards
| Organization | Year | Nominated Work | Category | Result | Country | Ref. |
|---|---|---|---|---|---|---|
| 3rd Ajyal Youth Film Festival | 2015 | Bambanti or "Scarecrow" | Hilal Best Feature Film | Won | Qatar | |
| Amsterdam International Film Festival | 2018 | Bagahe | Best Foreign Language Feature Film (with Jed Medrano and Milgaros How) | Nominated | Netherlands | |
| Amsterdam International Film Festival | 2018 | Bagahe | Best Original Screenplay of a Foreign Language Feature Film | Nominated | Netherlands | |
| Amsterdam International Film Festival | 2018 | Bagahe | Best Editing of a Foreign Language Film | Nominated | Netherlands | |
| Asia Independent Film Festival | 2018 | Bagahe | Best International Feature Film Award | Won | India | |
| 19th Asiatic Film Festival | 2022 | Bagahe | Jury Award in Crime and Drama | Won | Italy | |
| Bogotá Film Festival | 2014 | M: Mother's Maiden Name | Best Film | Nominated | Columbia | |
| Brussels International Festival of Films | 2015 | Bambanti | Best Film | Won | Belgium | |
| ContentAsia Awards | 2024 | Firefly | Best Asian Feature Film-Silver Medal | Won | Taiwan | |
| Cultural Diversity Film Festival | 2022 | Paglipay "Crossing" | Best Director | Won | Canada | |
| Filipino International Cine Festival (FACINE) | 2021 | Black Rainbow | Best Film "Gold Award" | Won | United States of America | |
| Filipino International Cine Festival (FACINE) | 2021 | Black Rainbow | Best Director "Gold Award" | Won | United States of America | |
| Filipino International Cine Festival (FACINE) | 2022 | Liway | Best Screen play (with Kip Oebanda) | Won | United States of America | |
| Harlem International Film Festival | 2022 | Black Rainbow | Best Short Film | Won | United States of America | |
| 5th International Film Festival for Environment, Health, Culture (IFFEHC) | 2017 | Paglipay "Crossing" | International Award of Outstanding Excellence | Won | Indonesia | |
| Kaş International Film Festival | 2022 | Black Rainbow | Jury Award | Won | Turkey | |
| London International Film Festival | 2017 | Bagahe | Best Language Feature Film | Nominated | United Kingdom | |
| London International Film Festival | 2017 | Bagahe | Best Foreign Director | Nominated | United Kingdom | |
| LUCAS International Film Festival | 2022 | Black Rainbow | Best Short Film | Won | Germany | |
| Madrid International Film Festival | 2015 | The Bit Player or Ekstra | Best Editing (with Antoinette Jadaone and Jeffrey Jeturian) | Nominated | Spain | |
| Malaysia Golden Global Awards | 2019 | Liway | Best Film | Nominated | Malaysia | |
| Manila International Film Festival | 2024 | Firefly | Best Film | Won | United States of America | |
| Manila International Film Festival | 2024 | Firefly | Best Director | Won | United States of America | |
| Nantes Three Continents Festival | 2015 | Bagahe | Best Film "Golden Montgolfiere" | Nominated | France | |
| New York Festival TV and Film Awards | 2017 | Maria Clara and Ibarra | Best Entertainment: Drama Program-Bronze Medal | Won | United States of America | |
| Prague International Film Festival | 2022 | Black Rainbow | Best Foreign Language Short Film | Won | Czech Republic | |
| Vesoul International Film Festival | 2018 | Bagahe | Best Film "Gold Cyclo Award" | Won | France | |
| 51st WorldFest-Houston International Film Festival | 2018 | Bagahe | "Gold Remi Award" in Crime and Drama | Won | United States of America | |
| 5th World Film Awards | 2017 | Paglipay "Crossing" | International Feature Film | Won | Indonesia | |
| Zagora International Trans-Sahara Film Festival | 2018 | Bagahe | Special Critics Choice Award | Won | Africa | |
| Zagora International Trans-Sahara Film Festival | 2018 | Bagahe | People Choice Award | Won | Africa | |

=== National awards ===
Awards and nominations received by Zig Dulay
National Awards and Recognitions
| Organization | Year | Nominated Work | Category | Result | Ref. |
|---|---|---|---|---|---|
| Anak TV Seal Awards | 2023 | Maria Clara at Ibarra | Household Favorite Program | Won | |
| 45th Catholic Mass Media Awards | 2023 | Maria Clara at Ibarra | Best Drama Series | Won | |
| Cinemalaya Independent Film Festival | 2011 | The Last Day in Baguio | NETPAC Trophy Award | Nominated | |
| Cinemalaya Independent Film Festival | 2013 | The Bit Player or Ekstra | Best Screenplay (with Antoinette Jadaone and Jeffrey Jeturian) | Won | |
| Cinemalaya Independent Film Festival | 2013 | Missing | Best Short-film | Nominated | |
| Cinemalaya Independent Film Festival | 2017 | Bagahe | Best Screenplay | Won | |
| Cinemalaya Independent Film Festival | 2017 | Bagahe | Special Jury Prize | Won | |
| Cinemalaya Independent Film Festival | 2021 | Black Rainbow | Best Short Film | Won | |
| Cinemalaya Independent Film Festival | 2021 | Black Rainbow | NETPAC Trophy Award | Won | |
| Cinemalaya Independent Film Festival | 2021 | Black Rainbow | Best Screenplay | Won | |
| Cinemalaya Independent Film Festival | 2021 | Black Rainbow | Best Editing | Won | |
| Cinemalaya Independent Film Festival | 2022 | The Baseball Player | Best Editing | Won | |
| EDDYS Awards | 2019 | Liway | Best Screenplay (with Kip Oebanda) | Won | |
| EDDYS Awards | 2024 | Firefly | Best Picture | Nominated | |
| EDDYS Awards | 2024 | Firefly | Best Director | Nominated | |
| FAMAS Awards | 2014 | The Bit Player or Ekstra | Best Story (with Antoinette Jadaone and Jeffrey Jeturian) | Nominated | |
| FAMAS Awards | 2014 | The Bit Player or Ekstra | Best Screenplay (with Antoinette Jadaone and Jeffrey Jeturian) | Nominated | |
| FAMAS Awards | 2014 | The Bit Player or Ekstra | Best Editing (with Glenn Ituriaga) | Nominated | |
| Gawad Banyuhay Award | 2022 | Maria Clara at Ibarra | Best Educational Program | Won | |
| Gawad Dangal Filipino Awards | 2022 | Maria Clara at Ibarra | Best TV Director of the Year | Won | |
| Gawad Dangal Filipino Awards | 2025 | Green Bones | Best Picture | Won | |
| Gawad Dangal Filipino Awards | 2025 | Green Bones | Best Director | Won | |
| Gawad Urian Awards | 2012 | Posas | Best Screenplay | Nominated | |
| Gawad Urian Awards | 2013 | Missing | Best Short Film | Won | |
| Gawad Urian Awards | 2016 | Bambanti | Best Director | Nominated | |
| Gawad Urian Awards | 2016 | Bambanti | Best Screenplay | Nominated | |
| Gawad Urian Awards | 2017 | Paglipay | Best Picture | Nominated | |
| Gawad Urian Awards | 2017 | Paglipay | Best Director | Nominated | |
| Gawad Urian Awards | 2017 | Paglipay | Best Screenplay | Nominated | |
| Gawad Urian Awards | 2017 | Paglipay | Best Editing | Nominated | |
| Gawad Urian Awards | 2022 | The Baseball Player | Best Editing | Nominated | |
| Gawad Urian Awards | 2024 | Firefly | Best Picture | Nominated | |
| Gawad Urian Awards | 2024 | Firefly | Best Director | Nominated | |
| 5th Gawad Lasallianeta | 2023 | Maria Clara at Ibarra | Teleserye and Green Zeal Award of Excellence | Won | |
| 7th GEMS Awards | 2023 | Maria Clara at Ibarra | Best TV Series | Won | |
| 6th Golden Laurel Awards | 2022 | Best Drama Series | Maria Clara at Ibarra | Won | |
| 11th Golden Screen Awards | 2014 | The Bit Player | Best Editing (with Glenn Ituriaga) | Nominated | |
| Knights of Rizal 23rd International Assembly | 2023 | Special citation | Maria Clara at Ibarra | Won | |
| Luna Awards | 2017 | Neomanila | Best Screenplay (with Mikhail Red and Rae Red) | Nominated | |
| Luna Awards | 2019 | Liway | Best Screenplay (with Kip Oebanda) | Won | |
| Luna Awards | 2022 | The Baseball Player | Best Editing | Nominated | |
| Metro Manila Film Festival | 2014 | M: Mother's Maiden Name | Special Jury Prize | Won | |
| Metro Manila Film Festival | 2023 | Firefly | Best Picture | Won | |
| Metro Manila Film Festival | 2023 | Firefly | Best Director | Nominated | |
| Metro Manila Film Festival | 2024 | Green Bones | Best Picture | Won | |
| Metro Manila Film Festival | 2024 | Green Bones | Best Director | Nominated | |
| Metro Manila Film Festival | 2024 | Green Bones | Fernando Poe Jr. Memorial Award for Excellence | Nominated | |
| Platinum Stallion National Media Awards | 2023 | Firefly | Best Director | Won | |
| Platinum Stallion National Media Awards | 2023 | Maria Clara at Ibarra | Best Primetime Drama Series and Culturally Relevant TV Series | Won | |
| PMPC Star Awards for Movies | 2013 | The Bit Player or Ekstra | Indie Movie Screenwriter (with Antoinette Jadaone and Jeffrey Jeturian) | Nominated | |
| PMPC Star Awards for Movies | 2013 | The Bit Player or Ekstra | Best Editing (with Glenn Ituriaga) | Nominated | |
| PMPC Star Awards for Movies | 2015 | Bambanti | Movie Director of the Year | Won | |
| PMPC Star Awards for Movies | 2015 | Bambanti | Indie Movie Screenwriter | Nominated | |
| PMPC Star Awards for Movies | 2015 | Bambanti | Indie Movie Editor | Nominated | |
| PMPC Star Awards for Movies | 2015 | Bambanti | Indie Movie Bambanti Original Theme Song "Tulog na" (with Gian Gianan and Alessandra De Rossi) | Won | |
| PMPC Star Awards for Movies | 2016 | Paglipay | Indie Movie Director of the Year | Nominated | |
| PMPC Star Awards for Movies | 2016 | Paglipay | Indie Movie Screen writer | Nominated | |
| PMPC Star Awards for Movies | 2016 | Paglipay | Indie Movie Editor | Nominated | |
| PMPC Star Awards for Movies | 2016 | Paglipay | Indie Movie Original Theme Song "Panata" (shared with Gian Gianan and Alessandra De Rossi) | Won | |
| PMPC Star Awards for Movies | 2018 | Liway | Indie Movie Screen writer of the Year (with Kip Oebanda) | Nominated | |
| PMPC Star Awards for Movies | 2021 | Black Rainbow | Best Short Film | Won | |
| PMPC Star Awards for Movies | 2021 | Black Rainbow | Best Short film Director | Won | |
| PMPC Star Awards for Movies | 2022 | The Baseball Player | Indie Movie Editor of the Year | Nominated | |
| Society of Filipino Film Reviewers | 2022 | Black Rainbow | Best Live Action Short Film | Nominated | |
| Sinag Maynila Film Festival | 2019 | Ang Aking Korona | People's Choice Awards | Won | |
| Sinag Maynila Film Festival | 2019 | Ang Aking Korona | Best Picture | Nominated | |
| Sinag Maynila Film Festival | 2019 | Ang Aking Korona | Best Director | Nominated | |
| Sinag Maynila Film Festival | 2019 | Ang Aking Korona | Best Screenplay | Nominated | |
| ToFarm Film Festival | 2016 | Paglipay | Best Picture | Won | |
| ToFarm Film Festival | 2016 | Paglipay | Best Director | Won | |
| 17th UP ComBroadSoc Gandingan Awards | 2023 | Maria Clara at Ibarra | Development-Oriented Drama Program (Special Citation) | Won | |
| Urduja Film Festival | 2016 | Bambanti | Best Picture | Included | |
| Urduja Film Festival | 2017 | Paglipay | Best Heritage Film | Included | |
| Urduja Film Festival | 2017 | Paglipay | Best Director | Included | |

=== Honorary awards ===
Awards and nominations received by Zig Dulay
| Organization | Year | Work / Nominee | Category | Result | Ref. |
|---|---|---|---|---|---|
| Ani ng Dangal | 2016 | Bambanti - Brussels International Festival of Films Award | Harvest of Honors in Cinema | Honored | |
| Ani ng Dangal | 2016 | Zig Dulay | Harvest of Honors in Cinema | Honored | |
| Ani ng Dangal | 2018 | Paglipay | Harvest of Honors in Cinema | Honored | |
| Ani ng Dangal | 2019 | Bagahe - Vesoul International Film Festival of Asian Cinema "Golden Cyclo Award" | Harvest of Honors in Cinema | Honored | |
| Ani ng Dangal | 2022 | Black Rainbow - LUCAS International Festival for Young Film Lovers Award | Harvest of Honors in Cinema | Honored | |
| Department of Tourism (PH) - Cine Turismo | 2018 | Paglipay - CineTurismo Award | Film Tourism | Honored | |
| Film Development Council of the Philippines | 2018 | Bagahe - Vesoul International Film Festival "Golden Cyclo Award" (Top prize) | Camera Obscura Artistic Excellence Award | Honored | |
| Film Development Council of the Philippines | 2018 | Paglipay - World Film Awards and International Film Festival for Environment, Health, Culture (IFFEHC) Awardee | 2nd Film Ambassador Night (FAN) - Full length film | Honored | |
| Film Development Council of the Philippines | 2019 | Zig Dulay | Sine-Sandaan Luminary Award - New Voices of Luzon | Honored | |
| Film Development Council of the Philippines | 2019 | Zig Dulay | TV Documentary Category | Honored | |
| Film Development Council of the Philippines | 2020 | Bagahe - Zagora International Trans-Sahara Film Festival Award | 4th Film Ambassador Night (FAN) - Feature Film | Honored | |
| Inquirer Indie Bravo! | 2016 | Bambanti | Indie Bravo Awards | Honored | |
| Inquirer Indie Bravo! | 2017 | Paglipay | Indie Bravo Awards | Honored | |
| Inquirer Indie Bravo! | 2018 | Bagahe | Indie Bravo Awards | Honored | |
| Inquirer Indie Bravo! | 2022 | Black Rainbow | Indie Bravo Awards | Honored | |
| The Outstanding Young Men of the Philippines (TOYM) | 2024 | Zig Dulay - Firefly and Maria Clara and Ibarra | Culture and Arts: TV and Film category | Honored | |
| University of the Philippines Baguio | 2023 | Zig Dulay | Outstanding Alumni for Exceptional Achievements | Honored | |

=== Listicles ===
Name of publisher, name of listicle, year listed, and placement result
| Publisher | Listicle | Yea | Result | Ref. |
|---|---|---|---|---|
| Tatler Asia | Gen.T Leaders of Tomorrow | 2024 | Placed | |
