= List of Philippine films of 2017 =

This is an incomplete list of Filipino full-length films, both mainstream and independently produced, released in theaters and cinemas in 2017.

== Top ten grossing films ==
The highest-grossing Filipino films released in 2017, by domestic box office gross revenue, are as follows:

- – a Metro Manila Film Festival entry film

Rank	Title	Distributor	Box office
1.	Gandarrapiddo: The Revenger Squad	Star Cinema, Viva Films	₱571 million
2.	My Ex and Whys	Star Cinema	₱400 million
3.	Ang Panday	Star Cinema, Viva Films, CCM Film Productions	₱379 million
4.	Kita Kita	Viva Films, Spring Films, Sharo Entertainment Productions	₱320 million
5.	Can't Help Falling in Love	Star Cinema	₱320 million
6.	Finally Found Someone	Star Cinema, Viva Films	₱316.5 million
7.	Seven Sundays	Star Cinema	₱271 million
7.	Unexpectedly Yours	Star Cinema	₱249 million
9.	Love You to the Stars and Back	Star Cinema	₱112 million
10.	100 Tula Para Kay Stella	Viva Films	₱100 million

== Films ==
=== January–March ===
Opening		Title	Production company	Cast and crew	Genre	Ref.
J A N U A R Y	4	Mang Kepweng Returns	Viva Films, Cineko Productions	GB Sampedro (director); Vhong Navarro, Jaclyn Jose, James Blanco, Sunshine Cruz. Kim Domingo	Fantasy, comedy	
J A N U A R Y	11	Extra Service	Star Cinema, Skylight Films	Chris Martinez (director); Arci Muñoz, Coleen Garcia, Jessy Mendiola	Action, adventure	
J A N U A R Y	19	Darkroom	Viva Films, Blackops Studios Asia, Psyops8	Pedring A. Lopez (director); Ella Cruz, Bret Jackson, AJ Muhlach, Donnalyn Bartolome, Andrew Muhlach, Rose Van Ginkel, Caleb Santos, Samantha Capulong, Jack Reid	Horror	
J A N U A R Y	19	Ilawod	Quantum Films, MJM Productions, Tuko Film Productions, Buchi Boy Entertainment	Dan Villegas (director); Ian Veneracion, Iza Calzado, Xyriel Manabat, Therese Malvar, Epy Quizon, Harvey Bautista	Horror	
J A N U A R Y	25	Foolish Love	Regal Entertainment	Joel Lamangan (director); Angeline Quinto, Jake Cuenca, Miho Nishida, Tommy Esguerra	Romantic comedy	
J A N U A R Y	25	Across the Crescent Moon	Gold Barn International	Baby Nebrida (director); Matteo Guidicelli, Alexandra Godinez, Joem Bascon, Ivan Carapiet, Christopher de Leon, Dina Bonnevie	Action, drama	
F E B R U A R Y	1	Sakaling Hindi Makarating *(2017 commercial release)	Unitel Productions, Media East Productions	Ice Idanan (director); Alessandra de Rossi, Therese Malvar, Leslie Lina, Pepe Herrera, JC Santos	Drama, documentary	
F E B R U A R Y	1	Swipe	Aliud Entertainment, Ledge Films, Viva Films	Ed Lejano (director, writer); Mercedes Cabral, Meg Imperial, Alex Medina, Luis Alandy, Gabby Eigenmann, Ma. Isabel Lopez	Drama, suspense	
F E B R U A R Y	8	Moonlight Over Baler	T-Rex Entertainment	Gil Portes (director); Elizabeth Oropesa, Vin Abrenica, Ellen Adarna, Sophie Albert	Historical, romance	
F E B R U A R Y	15	I'm Drunk, I Love You	Tuko Film Productions, Buchi Boy Entertainment	JP Habac (director); Maja Salvador, Paulo Avelino	Romantic comedy	
F E B R U A R Y	15	My Ex and Whys	Star Cinema	Cathy Garcia Molina (director); Liza Soberano & Enrique Gil	Romantic comedy, drama	
M A R C H	1	Tatlong Bibe	Regis Films and Entertainment	Joven Tan (director); Lyca Gairanod, Marco Masa, Raikko Mateo, Dionisia Pacquiao	Family drama	
M A R C H	1	Baka Bukas *(2017 commercial release)	Star Cinema, Cinema One Originals	Samantha Lee (director); Jasmine Curtis-Smith, Louise delos Reyes	Romance	
M A R C H	8	Pwera Usog	Regal Entertainment	Jason Paul Laxamana (director); Devon Seron, Joseph Marco, Sofia Andres, Aiko Melendez, Albie Casiño	Horror	
M A R C H	9	Kristo	Solar Entertainment, Brillante Mendoza	HF Yambao (director); Angela Cortez, Julio Diaz, Kristoffer King	Drama	
M A R C H	9	Beyond the Block	Solar Entertainment, Brillante Mendoza	Ricardo Carranza (director);	Dance, docudrama	
M A R C H	9	Ladyfish	Solar Entertainment, Brillante Mendoza	Jason Orfalas (director); JC Santos, Martin Escudero, Brenda Mage, Ruby Ruiz	Comedy	
M A R C H	9	Bhoy Intsik	Solar Entertainment, Brillante Mendoza	Joel Lamangan (director); RS Francisco, Ronwaldo Martin, Elora Espano, Jim Pebangco	Crime, drama	
M A R C H	9	Tu Pug Imatuy (The Right To Kill)	Solar Entertainment, Brillante Mendoza	Arnel Barbarona (director); Malona Sulatan, Jong Monzon, Luis Georlin Banaag III	Drama	
M A R C H	15	2 Cool 2 Be 4gotten *(2017 commercial release)	Star Cinema, Cinema One Originals	Peterson Vargas (director); Khalil Ramos, Ethan Salvador, Jameson Blake	Teen drama	
M A R C H	22	Higanti	Gitana Film Productions	Rommel Ricafort (director); Assunta De Rossi, Jay Manalo, Meg Imperial, Katrina Halili, Jon Lucas, DJ Durano, Kiko Matos	Action, drama	
M A R C H	29	Northern Lights: A Journey to Love	Star Cinema, Regal Entertainment, Spring Films	Dondon Santos (director); Piolo Pascual, Yen Santos, Raiko Matteo	Drama	
M A R C H	29	Hiwaga: Ang Paglalakbay sa Liwanag ng Buhay	M7 Films	Sir Rca (director); John McEarl. Anne Catherine Cubelo, Jiane Abalos, Michaella Torres	Fantasy, drama	

Color key

– a Sinag Maynila Film Festival entry film

=== April–June ===
Opening		Title	Production company	Cast and crew	Genre	Ref.
A P R I L	15	Can't Help Falling in Love	Star Cinema	Mae Cruz-Alviar (director); Kathryn Bernardo, Daniel Padilla	Romantic comedy	
A P R I L	26	1st Sem *(2017 commercial release)	Team Campry Entertainment	Dexter Hemedez, Allan Ibanez (director); Lotlot de Leon, Darwin Yu, Miguel Bagtas, Alan Paule	Comedy, drama	
M A Y	2	Bubog	Blank Pages Productions	Arlyn dela Cruz (director/screenplay); Julio Diaz, Alan Paule, Karl Medina, Elizabeth Oropesa, Menggie Cobarrubias	Drama	
M A Y	3	Luck at First Sight	Viva Films, N^{2} Productions	Dan Villegas (director); Jericho Rosales, Bela Padilla, Jeric Raval, Dennis Padilla, Cholo Baretto, Kim Molina	Romance, drama	
M A Y	10	Bliss	Artikulo Uno Productions	Jerrold Tarog (director); Iza Calzado, Ian Veneracion, TJ Trinidad, Adrienne Vergara	Thriller	
M A Y	10	Our Mighty Yaya	Regal Entertainment	Jose Javier Reyes (director); Ai-Ai delas Alas, Megan Young, Sofia Andres, Zoren Legaspi, Eula Valdez	Comedy	
M A Y	17	Dear Other Self	Star Cinema	Veronica Velasco (director); Jodi Sta. Maria, Joseph Marco, Xian Lim	Romantic comedy	
M A Y	24	Ang Araw sa Likod Mo	An Earth Below Productions	Dominic Nuesa (director); Ping Medina, Bong Cabrera, Mike Liwag	Advocacy, war	
J U N E	14	Can We Still Be Friends?	Star Cinema	Prime Cruz (director); Gerald Anderson, Arci Muñoz	Romance	
J U N E	28	Ang Pagsanib kay Leah Dela Cruz	Viva Films, Reality Entertainment	Katski Flores (director); Shy Carlos, Sarah Lahbati	Horror	

=== July–September ===
Opening		Title	Production company	Cast and crew	Genre	Ref.
J U L Y	12	Bloody Crayons	Star Cinema	Topel Lee (director); Janella Salvador, Elmo Magalona, Sofia Andres, Diego Loyzaga, Jane Oineza, Maris Racal, Yves Flores, Empoy Marquez, Ronnie Alonte	Horror, thriller, mystery	
J U L Y	12	Baklad	ToFarm	Topel Lee (director); Ronwaldo Martin, Elora Españo, Rafa Siguion-Reyna	Drama, dark comedy	
J U L Y	12	High Tide	ToFarm	Tara Illenberger (director); Arthur Solinap, Sunshine Teodoro, Dalin Sarmiento	Drama, adventure	
J U L Y	12	Instalado	ToFarm	Jason Paul Laxamana (director); McCoy de Leon, Junjun Quintana, Francis Magundayao	Sci-fi	
J U L Y	12	Kamunggai	ToFarm	Vic Acedillo, Jr. (director); Dulce, Bayang Barrios, Skyzx Labastilla	Comedy, light drama	
J U L Y	12	Sinandomeng	ToFarm	Byron Bryant (director); Sue Prado, Julio Diaz, Lou Veloso, Lui Quiambao	Comedy	
J U L Y	12	What Home Feels Like	ToFarm	Joseph Abello (director); Bembol Roco, Irma Adlawan	Drama	
J U L Y	19	Kita Kita	Spring Films	Sigrid Bernardo (director); Alessandra De Rossi, Empoy Marquez	Romantic comedy	
J U L Y	26	Finally Found Someone	Star Cinema, Viva Films	Theodore Boborol (director); John Lloyd Cruz, Sarah Geronimo	Romance	
A U G U S T	5	Baconaua	Cinemalaya	Joseph Israel Laban (director); Elora Españo, Therese Malvar, JM Salvado, Bembol Roco	Coming-of-age drama	
A U G U S T	5	Bagahe	Cinemalaya	Zig Dulay (director); Angeli Bayani	Social drama	
A U G U S T	5	Ang Guro Kong 'Di Marunong Magbasa	Cinemalaya	Perry Escaño (director); Alfred Vargas, Mon Confiado, James Blanco, Miggs Cuaderno, Micko Laurente, Marc Justine Alvarez	Action, drama	
A U G U S T	5	Kiko Boksingero	Cinemalaya	Thop Nazareno (director); Noel Comia, Jr., Yayo Aguila, Yul Servo	Family drama	
A U G U S T	5	Nabubulok	Cinemalaya	Sonny Calvento (director); Gina Alajar, JC Santos, Billy Ray Gallion, Jameson Blake	Drama, crime	
A U G U S T	5	Ang Pamilyang Hindi Lumuluha	Cinemalaya	Mes de Guzman (director); Sharon Cuneta	Black comedy	
A U G U S T	5	Requited	Cinemalaya	Nerissa Picadizo (director); Jake Cuenca, Anna Luna	Drama	
A U G U S T	5	Respeto	Cinemalaya	Treb Monteras II (director); Abra, Dido de la Paz, Loonie	Hip-hop, drama	
A U G U S T	5	Sa Gabing Nanahimik ang mga Kuliglig	Cinemalaya	Iar Arondaing (director); Angel Aquino, Jake Macapagal	Social drama	
A U G U S T	9	Double Barrel	Viva Films	Toto Natividad (director); AJ Muhlach, Phoebe Walker, Jeric Raval	Action, crime	
A U G U S T	16	100 Tula Para Kay Stella	Viva Films	Jason Paul Laxamana (director); Bela Padilla, JC Santos	Romance, drama	
A U G U S T	16	AWOL	Skylight Films, CineBro	Enzo Williams (director); Gerald Anderson, Bembol Roco, Dianne Medina	Action	
A U G U S T	16	Bar Boys	SM Lifestyle Entertainment, TropicFrills Film Productions	Kip Oebanda (director); Carlo Aquino, Rocco Nacino, Enzo Pineda, Kean Cipriano	Comedy, drama	
A U G U S T	16	Birdshot *(2017 commercial release)	Tuko Film Productions, Buchi Boy Films, CJ Entertainment	Mikhail Red (director); Mary Joy Apostol, Arnold Reyes, Ku Aquino, John Arcilla	Mystery, thriller	
A U G U S T	16	Hamog *(2017 commercial release)	Cinema One Originals	Ralston Jover (director); Zaijan Jaranilla, Teri Malvar, Sam Quintana, Bon Lentejas, Kyline Alcantara	Crime, drama	
A U G U S T	16	Ang Manananggal sa Unit 23B *(2017 commercial release)	QCinema, The IdeaFirst Company, Indioboy Productions	Prime Cruz (director); Ryza Cenon, Martin del Rosario	Dark romance	
A U G U S T	16	Paglipay *(2017 commercial release)	ToFarm, Universal Harvester	Zig Dulay (director); Garry Cabalic, Joan dela Cruz, Anna Luna	Drama	
A U G U S T	16	Patay na si Hesus *(2017 commercial release)	QCinema, T-Rex Productions	Victor Villanueva (director); Jaclyn Jose, Chai Fonacier, Melde Montañez, Vincent Viado	Black comedy	
A U G U S T	16	Pauwi Na *(2017 commercial release)	ToFarm	Paolo Villaluna (director); Bembol Roco, Cherry Pie Picache, Meryll Soriano	Comedy, drama	
A U G U S T	16	Salvage *(2017 commercial release)	Cinema One Originals	Sherad Anthony Sanchez (director); Jessy Mendiola, JC de Vera	Horror	
A U G U S T	16	Star na si Van Damme Stallone *(2017 commercial release)	CineFilipino	Randolph Longjas (director); Candy Pangilinan, Paolo Pingol	Family drama	
A U G U S T	16	Triptiko	Michelena Brothers Production, Barrio's Pictures	Miguel Franco Michelena (director); Joseph Marco, Kylie Padilla, Kean Cipriano, Albie Casiño	Romance, thriller	
A U G U S T	23	Woke Up Like This	Regal Entertainment	Joel Ferrer (director); Vhong Navarro, Lovi Poe	Comedy	
A U G U S T	30	Love You to the Stars and Back	Star Cinema	Antoinette Jadaone (director); Julia Barretto and Joshua Garcia	Romance, drama	
S E P T E M B E R	6	FanGirl FanBoy	Viva Films, N^{2} Productions	Barry Gonzalez (director); Julian Trono, Ella Cruz	Romantic comedy	
S E P T E M B E R	13	DAD: Durugin ang Droga	Yebahdabadoo Entertainment	Dinkydoo Clarion (director); Allen Dizon, Alma Concepcion, Efren Reyes, Jackie Aquino, Jeffrey Santos, Rey "PJ" Abellana, Sharmaine Suarez, Jeric Raval	Drama, advocacy	
S E P T E M B E R	13	Loving in Tandem	Star Cinema	Giselle Andres (director); Maymay Entrata, Edward Barber, Kisses Delavin, Marco Gallo	Romantic comedy	
S E P T E M B E R	15	I Found My Heart in Santa Fe	BluArt Productions	Bona Fajardo (director); Roxanne Barcelo, Will Devaughn	Romantic comedy	
S E P T E M B E R	20	Amalanhig: The Vampire Chronicle	Viva Films, Vic Val Blue Sapphire Productions	Francis Posadas (director); Jerico Estregan, Sanya Lopez	Horror, action	
S E P T E M B E R	27	Last Night	Star Cinema, Spring Films, N^{2} Productions	Joyce Bernal (director); Piolo Pascual and Toni Gonzaga	Romantic comedy	
S E P T E M B E R	27	You with Me	Gitana Film Productions	Rommel Ricafort (director); Devon Seron, Hyun Woo, Jin Ju-Hyeong	Romance	

Color key

- – a Cinemalaya Philippine Independent Film Festival entry film
- – a Pista ng Pelikulang Pilipino entry film
- – a ToFarm (The Outstanding Farmers in the Philippines) Film Festival entry film

=== October–December ===
Opening		Title	Production company	Cast and crew	Genre	Ref.
O C T O B E R	4	The Debutantes	Regal Entertainment, The IdeaFirst Company	Prime Cruz (director); Sue Ramirez, Miles Ocampo, Michelle Vito, Jane de Leon, Chanel Morales	Horror, mystery	
O C T O B E R	4	New Generation Heroes	Golden Tiger Films	Anthony Hernandez (director); Aiko Melendez, Anita Linda, Jao Mapa, Joyce Peñas	Advocacy, drama	
O C T O B E R	11	Balatkayo	BG Productions International	Neal Tan (director); Aiko Melendez, Polo Ravales, Rico Barrera, Nathalie Hart, James Robert	Drama	
O C T O B E R	11	Seven Sundays	Star Cinema	Cathy Garcia-Molina (director); Ronaldo Valdez, Aga Muhlach, Dingdong Dantes, Cristine Reyes, Enrique Gil	Family drama, comedy	
O C T O B E R	13	Riding in Tandem	CineBro	Toto Natividad (director); Jason Abalos, Khalil Ramos	Action, crime	
O C T O B E R	17	The Helper	Cheeky Monkey Productions, Treacle	Joanna Bowers (director); Liza Avelino, Joy Carbonell, Jane Engelmann	Documentary	
O C T O B E R	18	Bes and the Beshies	Cineko Productions, Regal Entertainment	Joel Lamangan (director); Ai-Ai delas Alas, Zsa Zsa Padilla, Carmi Martin, Beauty Gonzalez	Comedy	
O C T O B E R	18	Si Tokhang at ang Tropang Buang	KIB Production, Red Post Production House	Roland Sanchez (director); Leo Martinez, Rey "PJ" Abellana, Dennis Padilla, Mon Confiado, K Brosas, Long Mejia, Erlinda Villalobos	Satirical comedy	
O C T O B E R	19	Balangiga: Howling Wilderness	QCinema	Khavn (director); Justine Samson, Warren Tuaño, Pio del Rio, Lourd de Veyra, Jun Sabayton, Roxlee, Daniel Palisa, Althea Vega	Historical epic	
O C T O B E R	19	The Chanters	QCinema	James Robin Mayo (director); Jally Nae Gilbaliga, Romulo Caballero	Comedy, drama	
O C T O B E R	19	Dapol Tan Payawar na Tayug 1931	QCinema	Christopher Gozum (director); Perry Dizon, Soliman Cruz, Cedrick Juan, Fe GingGing Hyde	History	
O C T O B E R	19	Dormitoryo	QCinema	Emerson Reyes (director); Jun Sabayton, Wowie de Guzman, Vandolph Quizon, Kate Alejandrino, Charles Salazar, Max Celada, Sheenly Gener, Ces Quesada	Comedy	
O C T O B E R	19	Kulay Lila ang Gabi na Binudburan pa ng mga Bituin	QCinema	Jobin Ballesteros (director); Max Eigenmann, Rafael Alonso, Jay Castillo, Frida Fridur	Drama	
O C T O B E R	19	Medusae	QCinema	Pam Miras (director); Desiree del Valle, Carl Palaganas	Drama, mystery	
O C T O B E R	19	Neomanila	QCinema	Mikhail Red (director); Eula Valdes, Rocky Salumbides, Timothy Castillo	Neo-noir, thriller	
O C T O B E R	19	The Write Moment	QCinema	Dominic Lim (director); Jerald Napoles, Valeen Montenegro	Romantic comedy, drama	
O C T O B E R	25	The Barker	Blank Pages Productions, Viva Films	Dennis Padilla (director); Empoy Marquez, Shy Carlos	Romantic comedy, action	
N O V E M B E R	1	The Ghost Bride	Star Cinema	Chito S. Roño (director); Kim Chiu, Matteo Guidicelli, Alice Dixson, Christian Bables	Horror	
N O V E M B E R	1	Spirit of the Glass 2: The Haunted	OctoArts Films, T-Rex Entertainment	Jose Javier Reyes (director); Cristine Reyes, Daniel Matsunaga, Maxine Medina, Benjamin Alves, Ashley Ortega, Enrico Cuenca, Janine Gutierrez	Horror	
N O V E M B E R	8	#12	Viva Films	Dondon Santos (director); Alessandra de Rossi, Ivan Padilla	Romance, drama	
N O V E M B E R	8	This Time I'll Be Sweeter	Regal Entertainment	Joel Lamangan (director); Barbie Forteza, Ken Chan	Romance	
N O V E M B E R	12	Guerrero	EBC Films	Carlo Ortega Cuevas (director); Genesis Gomez, Julio Cesar Sabenorio, Joyselle Cabanlong	Drama	
N O V E M B E R	13	Bundok Banahaw, Sacred and Profane	Cinema One Originals	Dempster Samarista (documentarist)	Documentary	
N O V E M B E R	13	Changing Partners	Cinema One Originals	Dan Villegas (director); Agot Isidro, Jojit Lorenzo, Sandino Martin, Anna Luna	Musical, romance	
N O V E M B E R	13	Si Chedeng at si Apple	Cinema One Originals	Fatrick Tabada, Rae Red (directors); Gloria Diaz, Elizabeth Oropesa	Black comedy	
N O V E M B E R	13	Haunted: A Last Visit to the Red House	Cinema One Originals	Phyllis Grande (documentarist)	Documentary	
N O V E M B E R	13	Historiographika Errata	Cinema One Originals	Richard Somes (director); Joem Bascon, Max Eigenmann, Alex Medina, Nathalie Hart	Historical satire	
N O V E M B E R	13	Nay	Cinema One Originals	Kip Oebanda (director); Sylvia Sanchez, Enchong Dee, Jameson Blake	Horror	
N O V E M B E R	13	Nervous Translation	Cinema One Originals	Shireen Seno (director); Jana Agoncillo	Family drama	
N O V E M B E R	13	Paki	Cinema One Originals	Giancarlo Abrahan (director); Dexter Doria, Noel Trinidad, Eula Valdes, Ricky Davao, Shamaine Buencamino, Ina Feleo, Paolo Paraiso	Dramedy	
N O V E M B E R	13	Throwback Today	Cinema One Originals	Joseph Teoxon (director); Carlo Aquino, Annicka Dolonius, Kat Galang	Sci-fi	
N O V E M B E R	15	Fallback	Cineko Productions, Star Cinema	Jason Paul Laxamana (director); Rhian Ramos, Zanjoe Marudo	Romantic comedy	
N O V E M B E R	22	Trip Ubusan: The Lolas vs. Zombies	APT Entertainment, M-Zet Productions	Mark A. Reyes (director); Jose Manalo, Wally Bayola, Paolo Ballesteros	Comedy horror	
N O V E M B E R	25	The Blood	Salvastar Movie Production	Jess Vargas (director/screenplay); Isabel Granada, Diana Salvador, Nissy May Avila, Tracy Tem Avila, Jess Vargas, Dan Alvaro	Action	
N O V E M B E R	29	Barbi, D' Wonder Beki	OctoArts Films, M-Zet Productions, T-Rex Entertainment	Tony Y. Reyes (director); Paolo Ballesteros, Joey De Leon	Action, comedy	
N O V E M B E R	29	Unexpectedly Yours	Star Cinema	Cathy Garcia-Molina (director); Sharon Cuneta, Robin Padilla, Julia Barretto, Joshua Garcia	Romantic comedy	
D E C E M B E R	6	Kamandag ng Droga	Viva Films	Carlo J. Caparas (director); Christopher de Leon, Sarah Lahbati, Lorna Tolentino, Mark Neumann, Meg Imperial, Ronnie Lazaro, CJ Caparas	Crime drama	
D E C E M B E R	6	Smaller and Smaller Circles	Tuko Film Productions, Buchi Boy Entertainment	Raya Martin (director); Nonie Buencamino, Sid Lucero, Bembol Roco, Carla Humphries	Horror	
D E C E M B E R	25	All of You	Quantum Films, MJM Productions	Dan Villegas (director); Jennylyn Mercado, Derek Ramsay	Romance, comedy	
D E C E M B E R	25	Deadma Walking	T-Rex Entertainment	Julius Alfonso (director); Joross Gamboa, Edgar Allan Guzman	Comedy, drama, musical	
D E C E M B E R	25	Gandarrapiddo: The Revenger Squad	Star Cinema, Viva Films	Joyce Bernal (director); Vice Ganda, Daniel Padilla, Pia Wurtzbach	Action, comedy	
D E C E M B E R	25	Haunted Forest	Regal Entertainment	Ian Loreños (director); Jane Oineza, Jameson Blake, Maris Racal, Jon Lucas	Horror, thriller	
D E C E M B E R	25	Ang Larawan	Culturtain Musicat Productions	Loy Arcenas (director); Joanna Ampil, Rachel Alejandro, Paulo Avelino	Musical	
D E C E M B E R	25	Meant to Beh	OctoArts Films, M-Zet Productions, APT Entertainment	Chris Martinez (director); Vic Sotto, Dawn Zulueta	Family, comedy	
D E C E M B E R	25	Ang Panday	CCM Productions, Star Cinema, Viva Films	Coco Martin (director); Coco Martin	Action, fantasy	
D E C E M B E R	25	Siargao	Ten17P	Paul Soriano (director); Jericho Rosales, Erich Gonzales, Jasmine Curtis-Smith	Romance, drama	

Color key

- – a Cinema One Originals Film Festival entry film
- – a QCinema International Film Festival entry film
- – a Metro Manila Film Festival entry film

== Awards ==
=== Local ===
The following first list shows the Best Picture winners at the four major film awards: FAMAS Awards, Gawad Urian Awards, Luna Awards and Star Awards; and at the three major film festivals: Metro Manila Film Festival, Cinemalaya and Cinema One Originals. The second list shows films with the most awards won from the four major film awards and a breakdown of their total number of awards per award ceremony.

Award/festival	Best Picture		Ref.
66th FAMAS Awards	Balangiga: Howling Wilderness		
41st Gawad Urian Awards	Balangiga: Howling Wilderness		
36th Luna Awards	Ang Larawan		
34th Star Awards for Movies	Changing Partners	Kita Kita	
28th Young Critics Circle Citations	Baconaua		
20th Gawad PASADO	(tied) Ang Larawan, Seven Sundays, Siargao		
16th Gawad Tanglaw	Respeto		
2nd Eddy's Awards	Respeto		
43rd Metro Manila Film Festival	Ang Larawan		
13th Cinemalaya Independent Film Festival	Respeto		
13th Cinema One Originals Film Festival	Paki		
5th QCinema Film Festival	Balangiga: Howling Wilderness		
2nd ToFarm Film Festival	High Tide		
3rd Sinag Maynila Film Festival	Tu Pug Imatuy		
1st Pista ng Pelikulang Pilipino	Birdshot		

Film	Total	FAMAS	Urian	Luna	Star
Ang Larawan	11	0	2	7	2
Balangiga: Howling Wilderness	7	5	2	0	0
Changing Partners	7	2	0	0	5
Respeto	7	2	4	0	1
Birdshot	4	0	0	1	3
Kita Kita	4	0	0	0	4
Bar Boys	3	1	1	0	1
Seven Sundays	3	0	0	3	0
Siargao	3	0	0	1	2
Tu Pug Imatuy	3	2	1	0	0
Yield	3	2	1	0	0
