= 34th PMPC Star Awards for Movies =

2017 Philippine Movie Press Club awards

34th Star Awards for Movies
- Date: February 18, 2018
- Hosted by: Judy Ann Santos; Kim Chiu; Julia Barretto; Xian Lim; Enchong Dee; Iza Calzado
- Produced by: Airtime Marketing Philippines
- Directed by: Bert de Leon
- Organized by: Philippine Movie Press Club (PMPC)

Highlights
- Best Picture: Kita Kita; Changing Partners (Indie)
- Most awards: Changing Partners (5)
- Most nominations: Ang Larawan (12)

Television coverage
- Network: ABS-CBN

The 34th PMPC Star Awards for Movies honored outstanding achievements in Philippine cinema for films released in 2017. Organized by the Philippine Movie Press Club (PMPC), the ceremony was held on February 18, 2018, at the Newport Performing Arts Theater in Resorts World Manila.

Ang Larawan led the nominees with 14 categories, while Kita Kita and Changing Partners emerged as the top winners of the night, receiving Movie of the Year and Indie Movie of the Year, respectively. Changing Partners won five awards, followed by Kita-Kita with four.

The event was hosted by Judy Ann Santos, Kim Chiu, Julia Barretto, Xian Lim, Enchong Dee, and Iza Calzado, with performances by Jona, Mark Santos, JBK, Neil Perez, Zeus Collins, Tanner Mata, Jameson Blake, Maris Racal, Loisa Andalio, Grae Fernandez, AC Bonifacio, and Louise delos Reyes. It was broadcast on ABS-CBN on March 18, 2018.

== Winners and Nominees ==
The following are the nominations for the 34th PMPC Star Awards for Movies, covering films released from January to December 2017.

Winners are listed first and indicated in bold.

=== Major categories ===
Movie of the Year (Mainstream)	Movie of the Year (Indie)
Winner: **Kita Kita** (Spring Films and Viva Films): 100 Tula Para Kay Stella (Viva Films); Ang Larawan (Culturtain Musicat Productions); Deadma Walking (T-Rex Entertainment Productions and Octo Arts Films); Love You to the Stars and Back (Star Cinema); Seven Sundays (Star Cinema); Siargao (TEN17P); Unexpectedly Yours (Star Cinema) ·	Winner: **Changing Partners** (Cinema One Originals): Bar Boys (Tropic Frills Film Productions); Bhoy Intsik (Frontrow Entertainment); Birdshot (TBA Studios and Pelikula Red); Bliss (TBA Studios); Guerrero (EBC Films); I'm Drunk, I Love You (TBA Studios); Respeto (Cinemalaya Foundation, Arkeofilms, and Dogzilla)
Movie Director of the Year	Indie Movie Director of the Year
Winner: **Sigrid Andrea Bernardo** (Kita Kita): Julius Alfonso (Deadma Walking); Loy Arcenas (Ang Larawan); Antoinette Jadaone (Love You to the Stars and Back); Jason Paul Laxamana (100 Tula Para Kay Stella); Cathy Garcia Molina (Seven Sundays); Cathy Garcia Molina (Unexpectedly Yours); Paul Soriano (Siargao)	Winner: **Dan Villegas** (Changing Partners): Carlo Ortega Cuevas (Guerrero); JP Habac (I'm Drunk, I Love You); Joel Lamangan (Bhoy Intsik); Alberto Monteras II (Respeto); Kip Oebanda (Bar Boys); Mikhail Red (Birdshot); Jerrold Tarog (Bliss)
Movie Actor of the Year	Movie Actress of the Year
Winner: **Raymond Francisco** (Bhoy Intsik): Dingdong Dantes (Seven Sundays); Joshua Garcia (Love You to the Stars and Back); Jojit Lorenzo (Changing Partners); Aga Muhlach (Seven Sundays); Robin Padilla (Unexpectedly Yours); Piolo Pascual (Last Night); Derek Ramsay (All Of You); Jericho Rosales (Siargao); Vic Sotto (Meant to Beh)	Winner: **Iza Calzado** (Bliss): Joanna Ampil (Ang Larawan); Kim Chiu (The Ghost Bride); Sharon Cuneta (Unexpectedly Yours); Alessandra De Rossi (Kita Kita); Agot Isidro (Changing Partners); Jennylyn Mercado (All Of You); Bela Padilla (100 Tula Para Kay Stella); Maja Salvador (I'm Drunk, I Love You); Jodi Sta. Maria (Dear Other Self)
Movie Supporting Actor of the Year	Movie Supporting Actress of the Year
Winner: **Arnold Reyes** (Birdshot): Ku Aquino (Birdshot); Nonie Buencamino (Ang Larawan); Miggs Cuaderno (Ang Guro Kong ‘Di Marunong Magbasa); Enrique Gil (Seven Sundays); Matteo Guidicelli (Can't Help Falling in Love); Edgar Allan Guzman (Deadma Walking); Xian Lim (Dear Other Self); Joseph Marco (Dear Other Self); Ronwaldo Martin (Bhoy Intsik)	Winner: **Odette Khan** (Bar Boys): Julia Barretto (Unexpectedly Yours); Jasmine Curtis-Smith (Siargao); Alice Dixson (The Ghost Bride); Chai Fonacier (Respeto); Celeste Legaspi (Ang Larawan); Therese Malvar (Ilawod); Aiko Melendez (Pwera Usog); Pilar Pilapil (Unexpectedly Yours); Dimples Romana (Deadma Walking)
New Movie Actor of the Year	New Movie Actress of the Year
Winner: Tied between **McCoy De Leon** (Instalado) and **Mateo San Juan** (Magkadugo): Abra (Respeto); Jay Castillo (Kulay Lila Ang Gabi Na Binudburan Pa Ng Mga Bituin); Kyle Echarri (Seven Sundays); Genesis Gomez (Guerrero); Kenneth Medrano (Trip Ubusan); Ivan Padilla (12); Ahwel Paz (Bhoy Intsik); Raffy Reyes (Bubog)	Winner: Tied between **Joanna Ampil** (Ang Larawan) and **Pia Wurtzbach** (Gandarrapiddo! The Revenger Squad): Mary Joy Apostol (Birdshot); Maymay Entrata (Loving In Tandem); Maxine Medina (Spirit Of The Glass 2: The Haunted); Joyce Pilarsky (New Generation Heroes); Yen Santos (Northern Lights: A Journey To Love); Malona Sulatan (Tu Pug Imatuy); Jemina Sy (Bubog); Adrienne Vergara (Bliss)
Movie Child Performer of the Year
Winner: Tied between **Marco Masa** (Tatlong Bibe) and **Julio Cesar Sabenorio** (Guerrero): Marc Justine Alvarez (Ang Guro Kong ‘Di Marunong Magbasa); Caprice Cayetano (Trip Ubusan); Noel Comia Jr. (Kiko Boksingero); Christine Mary Demaisip (High Tide); Baste Granfon (Meant To Beh); Raikko Mateo (Northern Lights: A Journey To Love); Enzo Pelojero (Ang Panday); Justine Quilantang (Gandarrapiddo! The Revenger Squad)

=== Technical categories ===
Movie Screenwriter of the Year	Indie Movie Screenwriter of the Year
Winner: **Sigrid Andrea Bernardo** (Kita Kita): Eric Cabahug (Deadma Walking); Antoinette Jadaone (Love You To The Stars And Back); Jason Paul Laxamana (100 Tula Para Kay Stella); Melai Monge, Kiko Abrillo, John Raphael Gonzaga (Seven Sundays); Anj Pessumal (Siargao); Karen Ramos and Janica Mae Regalo (Unexpectedly Yours); Rolando Tinio (Ang Larawan)	Winner: **Lilit Reyes and Vincent De Jesus** (Changing Partners): Giancarlo Abrahan and JP Habac (I'm Drunk, I Love You); Ronald Carballo (Bhoy Intsik); Carlo Ortega Cuevas (Guerrero); Njel De Mesa and Alberto Monteras II (Respeto); Kip Oebanda (Bar Boys); Rae Red and Mikhail Red (Birdshot); Jerrold Tarog (Bliss)
Movie Cinematographer of the Year	Indie Movie Cinematographer of the Year
Winner: **Odyssey Flores** (Siargao): Lee Briones-Meily (Deadma Walking); Odyssey Flores (Ang Panday); Theo Lozada (Seven Sundays); Rommel Sales (100 Tula Para Kay Stella); Rommel Sales (Pwera Usog); Boy Yñiguez (Ang Larawan); Boy Yñiguez (Kita Kita)	Winner: **Mycko David** (Birdshot): Ike Avellana (Respeto); Mycko David (Ilawod); Mycko David (Neomanila); Don Gerardo Frasco (Si Chedeng At Si Apple); Mackie Galvez (Bliss); Rain Yamson (Bhoy Intsik); Boy Yñiguez (I'm Drunk, I Love You)
Movie Production Designer of the Year	Indie Movie Production Designer of the Year
Winner: **Benjamin Padero and Carlo Tabije** (Siargao): Nancy Arcega (Ang Panday); Angel Diesta (Deadma Walking); Gino Gonzales (Ang Larawan); Mervin Lacerna (Pwera Usog); Mark Christian Sabas (The Ghost Bride); Gerry Santos (Last Night); Thesa Tang (Kita Kita)	Winner: **Michael Español** (Birdshot): Popo Diaz (Respeto); Edgar Martin Littaua (Bhoy Intsik); Shari Marie Montiague (Ilawod); Benjamin Padero and Carlo Tabije (Si Chedeng At Si Apple); Aped Santos (Bar Boys); Aped Santos (Nay); Monica Sebial (Bliss)
Movie Editor of the Year	Indie Movie Editor of the Year
Winner: **Marya Ignacio** (Kita Kita): Mai Calapardo (100 Tula Para Kay Stella); Vanessa De Leon (Deadma Walking); Lawrence Fajardo (Ang Larawan); Marya Ignacio (Love You To The Stars And Back); Marya Ignacio (Seven Sundays); Marya Ignacio (Unexpectedly Yours); Mark Victor (Siargao)	Winner: **Marya Ignacio** (Changing Partners): Lawrence Ang (Respeto); JD Domingo (Bar Boys); JD Domingo (Nay); Marya Ignacio (Ilawod); Jay Halili and Mikhail Red (Birdshot); Jerrold Tarog (Bliss); John Anthony Wong (Bhoy Intsik)
Movie Musical Scorer of the Year	Indie Movie Musical Scorer of the Year
Winner: **Ryan Cayabyab** (Ang Larawan): Len Calvo (Kita Kita); Cesar Francis Concio (Love You To The Stars And Back); Von De Guzman (Deadma Walking); Robbie Factoran and Ricardo Jugo (Siargao); Jessie Lasaten (Can't Help Falling In Love); Jessie Lasaten (Unexpectedly Yours); Paulo Protacio (100 Tula Para Kay Stella)	Winner: **Vincent De Jesus** (Changing Partners): Abet Alfonso and Amiel Tuazon (Guerrero); Teresa Barrozo (Birdshot); Alyana Cabral (Bar Boys); Jay Durias (Respeto); Jerrold Tarog (Bliss); Jerrold Tarog (I'm Drunk, I Love You); Emerzon Texon (Bhoy Intsik)
Movie Sound Engineer of the Year (Mainstream)	Movie Sound Engineer of the Year (Indie)
Winner: **Albert Michael Idioma** (The Ghost Bride): KC Caballero, Hit Productions (Ang Larawan); Lamberto Casas, Jr. (Deadma Walking); Lamberto Casas, Jr and Immanuel Verona (Pwera Usog); Albert Michael Idioma (Ang Panday); Albert Michael Idioma (Last Night); Mikko Quizon, Jason Conanan, Kat Salinas, Mark Locsin (Siargao); Allen Roy Santos (Love You To The Stars And Back)	Winner: **Mikko Quizon** (Bliss): Corinne De San Jose (Respeto); Monoxide Works (Nay); Mikko Quizon, Jason Conanan, Kat Salinas (Changing Partners); Mikko Quizon and Jason Conanan (Ilawod); Mikko Quizon (I'm Drunk, I Love You); Alex Tomboc and Bebet Casas (Birdshot); John Anthony Wong, Apol Cebreiros, Paulo Agudelo (Bhoy Intsik)
Movie Original Theme Song of the Year (Mainstream)	Movie Original Theme Song of the Year (Indie)
Winner: **"Natapos Tayo"** – composed by Nar Cabico, arranged by Mic Llave, interpreted by Nar Cabico (All Of You): "Aking Ligaya" (Deadma Walking); "Ang Panday" (Ang Panday); "Huling Gabi" (Last Night); "Kaya Natin ‘Yan" (100 Tula Para Kay Stella); "Maging Superhero" (Gandarrappido! The Revenger Squad); "Twelve" (12)	Winner: **"Respeto"** – lyrics by Abra and Loonie, music by Jay Durias, beats by B-Boy Garcia, interpreted by Abra and Loonie (Respeto): "Basta’t Kasama Kita" (I'm Drunk, I Love You); "Darating Din" (Ang Guro Kong ‘Di Marunong Magbasa); "Kahit Saglit" (You With Me); "One In You" (Maestra); "Wag Mong Isipin" (Bubog)

== Special awards ==
- Darling of the Press – Harlene Bautista
- Movie Loveteam of the Year – Joshua Garcia and Julia Barretto (Love You To The Stars And Back)
- Nora Aunor Ulirang Artista Lifetime Achievement Award – Gina Alajar
- Ulirang Alagad ng Pelikula sa Likod ng Kamera Lifetime Achievement Award – Tikoy Aguiluz
- Male Star of the Night – Xian Lim
- Female Star of the Night – Tied between Kim Chiu and Joyce Peñas Pilarsky
- Plaza Fair Male Face of the Night – Joshua Garcia
- Plaza Fair Female Face of the Night – Celeste Legaspi

== Most nominations ==
The following table lists the films with the most nominations for this PMPC Star Awards for Movies edition. Counts include all competitive categories.

Nominations by Film
Nominations	Film
12	Ang Larawan
11	Bhoy Intsik
11	Birdshot
11	Deadma Walking
11	Respeto
10	Bliss
10	Siargao

== Most wins ==
The following table lists the films with the most wins for this PMPC Star Awards for Movies edition. Counts include all competitive categories.

Wins by Films
Wins	Films
5	Changing Partners
4	Kita Kita
3	Birdshot
