= Sandino Martin =

Filipino actor

- Born: Augusto Rafael Sandino Martin; October 12, 1991 (age 34); Philippines
- Occupation: Actor
- Years active: 2014–present
- Agent: Star Magic (2021–present)

Augusto Rafael Sandino Martin (born October 12, 1991) or known professionally as Sandino Martin is a Filipino actor.

== Personal life ==
Martin was raised a Mormon.

== Filmography ==
=== Television ===
Year	Title	Role	Source
2015 / 2017	FPJ's Ang Probinsyano	SPO2 Marlon Delgado	
2016	Karelasyon	Jopet	Episode: "Rigodon"
2018	The Blood Sisters	Juancho	
2019	Sino ang Maysala?: Mea Culpa	Gaylord Mamaril	
2020	Almost Paradise	Kidlat Luzon	Episode: "It's Personal"
2022	The Broken Marriage Vow	Dr. Barry Valdicano	
2023	Cattleya Killer	Nolet	

=== Film ===
Year	Title	Role	Notes	Source
2014	Unfriend	David		
2014	Dagitab	Angelo		
2014	Esprit de Corps	Pvt. Abel		
2016	Ang Tulay ng San Sebastian			
2016	Ringgo: The Dog Shooter	Ringgo		
2016	Oro	Cesar		
2016	Ang Larawan	Bitoy Camacho		
2016	Changing Partners	Cris		

=== Theater ===
Year	Title	Role	Notes	Source
2009	Spring Awakening	Otto	Atlantis Theatrical Entertainment Group	
2011	William		Philippine Educational Theater Association	
2013	Piaf		Atlantis Theatrical Entertainment Group	
2015	Manhid		Ballet Philippines	
2016	Awitin Mo, Isasayaw Ko		Ballet Philippines	
2016	Changing Partners	Cris	Philippine Educational Theater Association	
2018	Himala: The Musical	Pilo	Sandbox Collective and 9 Works Theatrical	
2019	Spring Awakening	Melchior Gabor	Atlantis Theatrical Entertainment Group	

== Awards and nominations ==
Year	Work	Award	Category	Result	Source
2014	Esprit de Corps	Cinema One Originals Film Festival	Best Actor	Won	
2015	Esprit de Corps	Gawad Urian Awards	Best Actor	Nominated	
2015	Esprit de Corps	PMPC Star Awards for Movies	New Movie Actor of the Year	Nominated	
2016	Ang Tulay ng San Sebastian	CineFilipino Film Festival	Best Actor	Nominated	
2016	Ringgo: The Dog Shooter	Filipino New Cinema Award	Best Performance by an Actor	Won	
2016	Oro	Metro Manila Film Festival	Best Supporting Actor	Nominated	
2016	Changing Partners	Cinema One Originals Film Festival	Best Actor	Nominated	
2016	Changing Partners	Cinema One Originals Film Festival	Best Acting Ensemble	Won	
2017	Ang Tulay ng San Sebastian	Young Critics Circle Awards	Best Performance by Male or Female, Adult or Child, Individual or Ensemble in Leading or Supporting Role	Nominated	
2017	Ringgo: The Dog Shooter	FAMAS Awards	Best Actor	Nominated	
2017	Nananaghoy Ang Puso Ko (Note: As performer. Written and arranged by Tonton Hernandez.)	PMPC Star Awards for Movies	Movie Original Theme Song of the Year (Indie)	Nominated	
2017	Ang Larawan	Metro Manila Film Festival	Best Supporting Actor	Nominated	
2018	Changing Partners	Gawad Urian Awards	Best Actor	Nominated	
2018	Changing Partners	Luna Awards	Best Actor	Nominated	
