= Wedding Tayo, Wedding Hindi! =

Wedding Tayo, Wedding Hindi
- Theatrical movie poster
- Directed by: Jose Javier Reyes
- Written by: Jose Javier Reyes
- Produced by: Elma S. Medua (supervising)
- Starring: Toni Gonzaga; Eugene Domingo; Zanjoe Marudo; Wendell Ramos
- Cinematography: Rodolfo Aves Jr.
- Edited by: Tara Illenberger
- Music by: Jesse Lucas
- Production companies: Star Cinema; OctoArts Films
- Distributed by: Star Cinema
- Release date: August 31, 2011
- Running time: 115 minutes
- Country: Philippines
- Language: Filipino
- Box office: ₱65.9 million

Wedding Tayo, Wedding Hindi! is a 2011 Filipino comedy film written and directed by Jose Javier Reyes. Titled as a pun on the phrase "pwedeng tayo, pwedeng hindi" (transl. We could be, we could also not be), it stars Toni Gonzaga, Eugene Domingo, Zanjoe Marudo and Wendell Ramos. It was released by Star Cinema. The film premiered on August 31, 2011.

The film is about two people trying to discover the significance of marriage, love and relationships.

== Synopsis ==
The story follows two cousins who are in a crossroad of their romantic relationship. Maribelle, a Japanese singer returns home to marry her childhood sweetheart while Preciosa has left her family and files for an annulment from her husband. The two try to persuade each other that their views on love and marriage is better than the other, in hopes of saving themselves from a life of misery and pain.

== Cast ==
Main cast

- Toni Gonzaga as Maribelle "Belay" Bautista
- Eugene Domingo as Preciosa "Precy" Matias
- Zanjoe Marudo as Oscar "Oca" Bayteon
- Wendell Ramos as Benito "Ben" Matias

Supporting cast

- Nikki Valdez as Mila
- Sylvia Sanchez as Yolanda "Yolly" Bautista
- Ramon Christopher as Delfin Bautista
- Miles Ocampo as Karen Matias
- Paul Salas as Jay-R Matias
- Teddy Corpuz as Elmer Bautista
- Miriam Quiambao as Atty. Lily Vargas
- Dominic Ochoa as Atty. Moises
- Wendy Valdez as Raquel
- Regine Angeles as Jocelyn
- Say Alonzo as Donna
- Manuel Chua as Bodyok
- Anna Luna as Wendy Bautista
- Irma Adlawan as Laura Bayteon
- Vangie Labalan as Loleng Garbanzos
- Odette Khan as Ursula Matias
- Lou Veloso as Nanoy Garbanzos
- Gigi Locsin as Mrs. Damian
- Tessie Villarama as Mrs. Castro
- Roli Innocencio as Roger
- Vincent de Jesus as Hermes
- April Anne Dolot as Jasmin
- Manolito Ampon as Frankie
- Jay Custodio as Wilson
- Antonette Garcia as Tessie
- Lani Tapia as Amy Rose
- Alvin Fortuna as Fred
- Vince Cando as Otep
- Lui Manansala as Judge Thelma San Luis

== Reception ==
The film premiered nationwide on August 31, 2011. It opened with a Php 16.7 million total of gross receipts in its first five days beating out Zombadings 1: Patayin sa Shokot si Remington in the Philippine box office, which also premiered the same day. Its total gross for its four weeks of showing added up to Php 37.2 million.
