= Anna Luna (actress) =

Filipino actress (born 1993)

- Born: Anna Jardeleza Luna; September 12, 1993 (age 33); Manila, Philippines
- Occupation: Actress
- Years active: 2010–present
- Agents: Star Magic (2010–2021); Viva Artists Agency (2021–present)
- Spouse: Clark Alpuerto (m. 2021)
- Children: 1

Anna Jardeleza Luna-Alpuerto (born September 12, 1993) is a Filipino actress. She is best known for starring in Philippine art-house and independent films, notably Mike de Leon's Citizen Jake, Nerissa Picadizo's Requited, and Chito Roño's Emir.

She was nominated best actress at the 2018 Philadelphia Independent Film Awards (PIFA) for her performance in the 2018 independent film Maestra (English title: An Educator).

== Career ==
She appeared in popular romance and comedy features like The Breakup Playlist (2015), How to Be Yours (2016), The Girl in the Orange Dress (2018), Tayo sa Huling Buwan ng Taon (2019), and the award-winning family drama Family Matters (2022).

Luna was officially launched as part of the Star Magic Circle in March 2018 after gaining mainstream attention for her breakthrough performance in the musical film Changing Partners. She later decided to transfer to Viva in 2021.

Luna is considered a highly skilled stage performer. Notably, she starred in the musical adaptation of Changing Partners and has taken on significant theatrical roles with groups like the Philippine Educational Theater Association (PETA), including their musical staging of One More Chance.

== Filmography ==
=== Film ===
Year	Title	Role	Ref.
2010	Emir	Rachel	
2011	Won't Last a Day Without You	DJ Pentunya	
2011	Wedding Tayo, Wedding Hindi	Wendy Bautista	
2013	Menor De Edad	Barbie	
2014	Shake, Rattle & Roll XV	Young Linda	
2014	Past Tense	Quennie	
2014	Beauty in a Bottle	Princess	
2015	The Breakup Playlist	Cathy	
2016	How to Be Yours	Liezl	
2017	Changing Partners	Chris	
2017	Bar Boys	Rachel	
2017	Requited	Sandy	
2017	Dear Other Self	Monica	
2018	The Girl in the Orange Dress	Karen Villegas / Anna's Sister	
2018	Citizen Jake	Mellisa	
2018	Single/Single: Love is Not Enough	Ranee	
2019	Silly Red Shoes	Celine Magpantay	
2019	Tayo sa Huling Buwan ng Taon	Anna	
2022	Family Matters	Irene	
2023	What If	Hannah	
2024	Mujiage	Rainalyn De Jesus	
2026	Enjoy Your Stay	Aileen	
2026	Wonderful Nightmare		

=== Television ===
Year	Title	Role	Ref.
2013–present	ASAP XP	Herself / performer	
2014	Pure Love	Jackie Cortez	
2014	Dream Dad	Young Nenita Viray-Javier	
2015	Maalaala Mo Kaya: Gasa	Agnes	
2015	Oh My G!	Sister Marie Bernard	
2015	Maalaala Mo Kaya: Entablado	Emy	
2015	Maalaala Mo Kaya: Kamay	Ferlita	
2015	Ipaglalaban Mo: Nasa Maling Landas	Lani	
2016	The Greatest Love	Young Lydia Balane-Thompson	
2016	Ipaglaban Mo: Bayaw	Flora	
2017	Tadhana: Huling Hiling	Lanie	
2017–2018	Hanggang Saan	Rizalina "Lina" Reyes	
2018	Bagani	Young Mother of Dilag and Ganda	
2019	Maalaala Mo Kaya: Youth Citizen	Myrna	
2019	Maalaala Mo Kaya: Passport	Jean	
2019	Sino ang May Sala?: Mea Culpa	Janet	
2019	Ipaglaban Mo: Hostage	Liezel	
2019	Hinahanap-hanap kita	Sugar	
2019–2020	Starla	Lolita Batumbakal	
2020	24/7	Charlotte Narvaes	
2022	Maalaala Mo Kaya: Logbook	Eva	
2022	Maalaala Mo Kaya: Selda	Eva	
2022–2023	The Iron Heart	Hera Cruz	
2023	Hex Boyfriend	Lupe	
2023–2024	Can't Buy Me Love	Kida	
2024	Wish Ko Lang: Sadista	Nida	
2024	What's Wrong with Secretary Kim	Laura	
2025	Incognito	Rita	
2025	Maalaala Mo Kaya: The Maguad Family Story	Tata	
2025	I Love You Since 1892	Josefina Montecarlos	
2025	Para sa Isa't Isa	Jona	

=== Music video appearances ===
Year	Title	Artist
2020	"A Trilogy - Patawad paalam, paalam & patawad"	Moira dela Torre with Ben&Ben

== Accolades ==
Awards and NominationsAwards and nominations received by Anna Luna
Award	Year	Category	Nominated work	Result	Ref.
Aliw Awards	2024	Best Lead Actress in a Musical	One More Chance	Nominated	
ASEAN International Film Festival and Awards	2015	Best Supporting Actress	Bendor	Nominated	
Cinema One Originals Digital Film Festival	2013	Best Supporting Actress	Bendor	Won	
Cinema One Originals Digital Film Festival	2013	Best Supporting Actress	Islands	Nominated	
Cinema One Originals Digital Film Festival	2015	Best Supporting Actress	Hamog	Nominated	
Cinema One Originals Digital Film Festival	2017	Best Actress	Changing Partners	Nominated	
Five Continents International Film Festival	2017	Best Lead Actress	Maestra	Won	
Gawad Urian Awards	2017	Best Supporting Actress (Pinakamahusay na Pangalawang Aktres)	Paglipay	Nominated	
Luna Awards	2018	Best Supporting Actress	Changing Partners	Nominated	
Philadelphia Independent Film Awards	2018	Best Actress	Maestra	Nominated	
