= 2017 Metro Manila Film Festival =

2017 film festival edition

2017 Metro Manila Film Festival 43rd Metro Manila Film Festival
- Awards: Gabi ng Parangal (transl. Awards Night)
- No. of films: 8
- Festival date: December 25, 2017 to January 7, 2018

MMFF chronology
- 44th ed. 42nd ed.

The 2017 Metro Manila Film Festival (MMFF) is the 43rd edition of the annual Metro Manila Film Festival held in Metro Manila and throughout the Philippines. It is organized by the Metropolitan Manila Development Authority (MMDA). During the festival, no foreign films are shown in Philippine theaters (except IMAX, 4D, and large format 3D theaters).

The festival began with the traditional Parade of Stars (Filipino: Parada ng mga Artista) on December 23, 2017. Unlike the previous editions, which held its parade in Manila, the 2017 parade was held in Muntinlupa to celebrate the centennial of the city's founding as a municipality.

== Launch and reform ==
The following was the criteria used in determining the final 8 entries:
1. Artistic excellence (40.0%)
2. Commercial appeal or viability (40.0%)
3. Filipino cultural and/or historical value (10.0%)
4. Global appeal (10.0%)

The 2017 Metro Manila Film Festival was formally launched on March 7, 2017. As part of the launch ceremony, changes to the composition of the MMFF Executive Committee were announced. The changes were made in a bid to include more sectors of the film industry – representatives from the academe, government, media, and private sector professionals.

Among the changes were the removal of Moira Lang and Ed Cabangot, who reportedly favor independent films, and the addition of representatives from theater chains. The best practices from the film entries selection criteria used for the previous edition will be adopted into the selection process of the 2017 edition with MMFF Chairman Thomas Orbos saying that the film festival will feature a film roster that are of "quality and box office potential".

New rules and regulations were introduced in the 2017 edition. This year's edition reintroduced the script submission which was the regulation prior to the 2016 edition. The festival committee will now select four scripts and four finished films that will completely make up the Magic 8. The selection criteria were also revised to reintroduce the controversial "commercial appeal/viability". The MMFF Executive Committee was criticized for these as it was alleged that the reintroduction of these old rules was made to accommodate the big mainstream studios that were mostly left out last year. This move was seen as a way to prioritize box-office success over quality films. After the announcement of the first four official entries from the script submissions, three members of the MMFF Executive Committee, namely, Ricky Lee, Rolando Tolentino and Kara Magsanoc-Alikpala, resigned due to failure to continue the reforms that occurred in the 2016 edition. In a joint statement, the three former members stated that they did not agree on the MMFF Execom "putting too much emphasis on commerce over art" and they also explained that the first four entries did not affect their decision to leave as they're planning to leave long before the announcement of these entries. Another MMFF Execom member, Ed Lejano, resigned only days after. The first three resigned members were replaced by Maryo J. de los Reyes, Joy Belmonte-Alimurung and Arnell Ignacio. The remaining fourth slot is kept open for representatives of the independent cinema.

== Entries ==
=== Feature films ===
The first four films were announced on June 30, 2017, representing the Magic 8, by using the script submission method. The last four official entries were announced on November 17, 2017, completing the list of 8 official entries. Of all the 26 submitted entries, 8 were chosen for the said film festival:

Title	Starring	Studio	Director	Genre
First batch
All of You	Jennylyn Mercado, Derek Ramsay	Quantum Films, MJM Productions	Dan Villegas	Romance, Comedy
Gandarrapiddo: The Revenger Squad	Vice Ganda, Daniel Padilla, Pia Wurtzbach	Star Cinema, Viva Films	Joyce Bernal	Action, Comedy
Meant to Beh	Vic Sotto, Dawn Zulueta	OctoArts Films, M-Zet Productions, APT Entertainment	Chris Martinez	Family, Comedy
Ang Panday	Coco Martin	CCM Productions, Star Cinema, Viva Films	Rodel Nacianceno	Action, Fantasy
Second batch
Deadma Walking	Joross Gamboa, Edgar Allan Guzman	T-Rex Entertainment	Julius Alfonso	Comedy, Drama, Musical
Haunted Forest	Jane Oineza, Jameson Blake, Maris Racal, Jon Lucas	Regal Entertainment	Ian Loreños	Horror, Thriller
Ang Larawan	Joanna Ampil, Rachel Alejandro, Paulo Avelino	Culturtain Musicat Productions	Loy Arcenas	Musical
Siargao	Jericho Rosales, Erich Gonzales, Jasmine Curtis-Smith	Ten17P	Paul Soriano	Romance, Drama

=== Short films ===
Aspirant producers had until September 1, 2017 to submit entries for the Short Film category. The eight short film entries were announced in November 2017. Two of the entries were animated films, Kinalimutan Natin ang mga Bata and Noel.

Title	Studio	Director
Anino (transl. Shadow)	Chrox Productions	Malaya Ad Castillo
Anong Nangyari kay Nicanor Dante? (transl. What Happened to Nicanor Dante?)	EMJEI Films and Photographs	Brian Spencer Reyes
Black Market	Lakan Media Creatives	Gio Gonzalves
Crab Mental	—N/a	Joaquin Bamba
Gunita	Pamantasan ng Lungsod ng Maynila	Ryceanne Marie Manlulu
Isang Gabi (One Night)	Lakan Media Creatives	Gio Gonzalves
Kinalimutan Natin ang mga Bata (transl. We Forgot about the Kids)	University of the Philippines Film Institute	Gilb Baldoza
Noel	Go Motion Productions	Win Gonzales

=== Rejected and unsubmitted entries ===
26 scripts for candidate film entries were submitted to the MMFF Executive Committee. Among these potential entries four films were accepted as the first official four entries. The following films had their scripts submitted to the film festival organizers but their entries were not accepted.

- Ang Bomba ni Ginger Paloma by Antoinette Jadaone
- Buy Bust by Erik Matti
- Deadma Walking by Julius Alfonso (later accepted)
- Ang Larawan by Loy Arcenas (later accepted)
- My Fairy Tail Love Story by Perci Intalan
- Ang Sikreto ng Piso by Perry Escaño

Other films reportedly has expressed interest to enter the 2017 MMFF prior to the announcement of the first four official entries:

- Bagtik by Chito Roño
- Blood Hunters: Rise of the Hybrids by Vincent Soberano
- Smaller and Smaller Circles by Raya Martin
- The Significant Others by Joel Lamangan
- Tuwa, Luha, Saya: Memoirs of Timog by Roderick Lindayag

The following films were reportedly submitted after the first four official entries were announced:

- Journeyman Finds Home: The Simone Rota Story by Albert Almendralejo and Maricel Cariaga
- Citizen Jake by Mike de Leon reportedly attempted to enter the film festival through the script method but it was clarified that the film may be submitted in its finished form at a later date. Due to issues of corruption within the festival committee, director Mike de Leon decided to cancel his entry for the festival.

== Parade of Stars ==
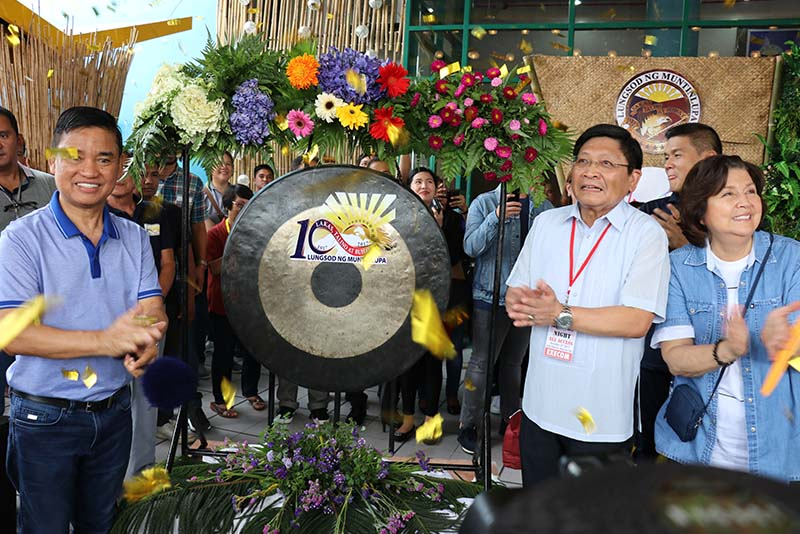
Muntinlupa Mayor Jaime Fresnedi and MMDA Chairman Danilo Lim leading the launching of the event.

The traditional Parade of Stars which featured floats of the film festival's eight entries took place in Muntinlupa instead of the traditional route on Roxas Boulevard in Manila proper. The organizers made the decision in order to give opportunity to other local government units of Metro Manila to host the customary event. The parade was also done as part of Muntinlupa's centennial on its foundation as a municipality on December 19, 1917.

The route of the parade began south of the city at the Muntinlupa Sports Complex and ended at the Filinvest Event Grounds in the barangay of Alabang. The route's scope included Buendia Street, Centennial Avenue, and the National Road.

== Awards ==
2017 Metro Manila Film Festival Gabi ng Parangal
- Date: December 27, 2017

Highlights
- Best Picture: Ang Larawan
- Most awards: Siargao (7)

Television coverage
- Network: TV5

The Gabi ng Parangal (transl. Awards Night) of the 2017 Metro Manila Film Festival was held on December 27, 2017 at the Kia Theatre in Quezon City.

=== Major awards ===
Winners are listed first, highlighted in boldface, and indicated with a double dagger (‡). Nominations are also listed if applicable.

Best Picture	Best Director
**Ang Larawan – Culturtain Musicat Productions**‡; Siargao – Ten17 Productions (2nd Best Picture); All of You – Quantum Films, MJM Productions (3rd Best Picture)	**Paul Soriano – Siargao**‡; Loy Arcenas – Ang Larawan; Julius Alfonso – Deadma Walking; Rodel Nacianceno – Ang Panday; Dan Villegas – All of You
Best Actor	Best Actress
**Derek Ramsay – All of You**‡; Joross Gamboa – Deadma Walking; Coco Martin – Ang Panday; Jericho Rosales – Siargao	**Joanna Ampil – Ang Larawan**‡; Erich Gonzales – Siargao; Jennylyn Mercado – All of You; Dawn Zulueta – Meant to Beh
Best Supporting Actor	Best Supporting Actress
**Edgar Allan Guzman – Deadma Walking**‡; Robert Arevalo – Ang Larawan; Nonie Buencamino – Ang Larawan; Jake Cuenca – Ang Panday; Sandino Martin – Ang Larawan	**Jasmine Curtis-Smith – Siargao**‡; Rachel Alejandro – Ang Larawan; Menchu Lauchengco – Ang Larawan; Dimples Romana – Deadma Walking; Andrea Torres – Meant to Beh
Best Child Performer	Best Screenplay
**Baeby Baste – Meant to Beh**‡	**Carl Chavez, Dan Villegas and Mae Chua – All of You**‡; Eric Cabahug – Deadma Walking; Anj Pessumal – Siargao
Best Cinematography	Best Production Design
**Odyssey Flores – Siargao**‡; Dexter Dela Peña – All of You; Boy Yniguez – Ang Larawan	**Gino Gonzales – Ang Larawan**‡; Benjamin Padero and Carlo Tabije – Siargao; Nancy Arcega – Ang Panday
Best Editing	Best Sound
**Mark Victor – Siargao**‡; Lawrence Fajardo – Ang Larawan; Marya Ignacio – All of You	**Mark Locsin, Mikko Quizon, Jason Conanan** **and Kat Salinas – Siargao**‡; Hit Productions – Ang Larawan; Albert Michael Idioma – Ang Panday
Best Original Theme Song	Best Musical Score
**"Alon" from Siargao – Hale**‡; "Biyaheng Langit" from Deadma Walking – Eric Cabahug; "Natapos Tayo" from All of You – Nar Cabico	**Ryan Cayabyab – Ang Larawan**‡; Von de Guzman – Deadma Walking; Robbie Factoran and Ricardo Jugo – Siargao
Best Visual Effects	Best Float
**Ang Panday**‡; Jux the Post – Haunted Forest	**Deadma Walking**‡
Gatpuno Antonio J. Villegas Cultural Award	Fernando Poe Jr. Memorial Award for Excellence
**Ang Larawan**‡	**Ang Panday**‡
People's Choice Award	Special Jury Prize
**Gandarrapiddo: The Revenger Squad**‡	**Nick Joaquin (posthumous) – Ang Larawan**‡; **Coco Martin – Ang Panday**‡
Children's Choice Award
**Ang Panday**‡

==== Other awards ====
- Male Star of the Night – **Derek Ramsay**
- Female Star of the Night – **Erich Gonzales**

=== Short Film category ===
- Best Picture – **Anong Nangyari kay Nicanor Dante?**
- People's Choice Award – **Noel**

== Multiple awards ==
Awards	Film
7	Siargao
6	Ang Larawan
4	Ang Panday
3	All of You
2	Deadma Walking

== Box office gross ==
A week prior to the start of the Metro Manila Film Festival it was agreed upon that the disclosure of sales record of all 8 entries will be prohibited. The organizers announced that the gross sales of the first and second day has surpassed the figures of the 2015 edition. On January 8, 2018, the MMFF executive committee announced that the total box office gross for all 8 entries surpassed ₱1 billion and decided to extend the screening of MMFF films in select cinemas beyond January 7, 2018.

Official Overall Gross (December 25, 2017 - January 7, 2018)
#	Entry	Gross Ticket Sales
1.	Gandarrapiddo: The Revenger Squad	₱ 571 million
2.	Ang Panday	₱ 204 million
3.	Siargao	₱ 80 million
4.	Haunted Forest	₱ 56 million
5.	Meant to Beh	₱ 51 million
6.	All of You	₱ 34 million
7.	Ang Larawan	₱ 29 million
8.	Deadma Walking	₱ 26 million
TOTAL		₱ 1.02 billion

Preceded by 2016 Metro Manila Film Festival	Metro Manila Film Festival; 2017	Succeeded by 2018 Metro Manila Film Festival
