= Baste Granfon =

Filipino actor (born 2012)

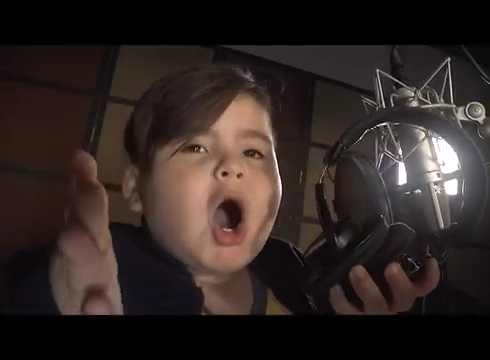
- Baste during the recording sessions of "Bastelicious" in 2017
- Born: Sebastian Benedict Granfon Arumpac; August 22, 2012 (age 14); General Santos, Philippines
- Other name: Bae-by Baste
- Occupations: actor; host; singer
- Years active: 2015–present

Sebastian Benedict Granfon Arumpac (born August 22, 2012) also known by his nicknames Baste Granfon and Bae-by Baste, is a Filipino child actor, television host, and singer. He was the youngest host in the roster of presenters of the longest-running noontime variety show Eat Bulaga!.

== Career ==
He first appeared in Kapuso Mo, Jessica Soho on July 19, 2015, as one of the featured segments of the news magazine television show.

He was one of the audience members of The Ryzza Mae Show when Ryzza Mae took a selfie with him. This led to Ryzza inviting him to appear on Ryzza's former TV talk show. Now he is a co-host of the longest-running noontime variety show in the Philippines, Eat Bulaga!

On August 19, 2017, during his 5th birthday celebration on Eat Bulaga!, Vic Sotto announced that Baste will be dubbed as the new "Youngest recording artist" of the country because he will be having his own dance single entitled "Bastelicious", which he performed live on Eat Bulaga!

== Filmography ==
=== Television ===
Year	Title	Role	Notes
2015–2021	Eat Bulaga!	Himself	Co-host
2015	Ang Pinaka	Himself	Guest
2015	Kapuso Mo. Jessica Soho	Himself	Guest
2015	AHA!	Himself	Guest
2016	Eat Bulaga! Lenten Special: Panata	Luke	Supporting cast
2017	Eat Bulaga! Lenten Special: Pagpapatawad	Biboy	Supporting cast
2018	Eat Bulaga! Lenten Special: Pamilya	Jed Leoncito	Supporting cast
2018	Daig Kayo ng Lola Ko: The Adventures of Laura Patola and Duwen-Ding	Duwen-Ding	Main role
2019	Eat Bulaga! Lenten Special: Bulawan	Kyle	Supporting cast
2019	Daddy's Gurl	Chukoy	Guest role
2019	The Gift	Kyle Cordero	Guest role
2019	Daig Kayo ng Lola Ko: Christmas Carol	Bobot	Supporting cast
2022	Jose & Maria's Bonggang Villa	Junior	Guest role
2023	E.A.T.	Himself/Performer	Guest
2025	Eat Bulaga!	Himself/Performer	Guest

=== Film ===
Year	Title	Role
2017	Meant to Beh	Riley
2018	Jack Em Popoy: The Puliscredibles	Angelo Montenegro

== Discography ==
Single
Year	Title	Ref.
2017	Bastelicious	

== Awards ==
Year	Award	Category	Work/Nominee	Result	Ref.
2016	3rd PEP List Awards	Pepster's Choice: Child Star of the Year	Eat Bulaga!	Won	
2016	Push Awards	Push Play: Best Newcomer	Eat Bulaga!	Nominated	
2016	30th PMPC Star Awards for Television	Best New Male TV Personality	Eat Bulaga!	Nominated	
2016	ComGuild Academe's Choice Awards	Most Loved Child Endorsers (with Ryzza Mae Dizon)	Himself	Won	
2017	9th ComGuild Awards	Most Admired Child Endorser	Himself	Won	
2017	43rd Metro Manila Film Festival	Best Child Performer	Meant to Beh	Won	
2018	49th GMMSF Box-Office Entertainment Awards	Most Popular Male Child Performer	Eat Bulaga & Meant to Beh	Won	

== See also ==
- Alden Richards
- AlDub
- Maine Mendoza
