= Haunted Forest (2017 film) =

Film by Ian Loreños

- Theatrical release poster
- Directed by: Ian Loreños; Agung Gede
- Written by: Jeps Gallon
- Produced by: Lily Y. Monteverde; Roselle Monteverde
- Starring: Jane Oineza; Jameson Blake; Maris Racal; Jon Lucas; Raymart Santiago; Joey Marquez
- Cinematography: Rommel Sales
- Edited by: Tara Illenberger
- Music by: Francis Concio
- Production company: Regal Entertainment
- Distributed by: Regal Entertainment
- Release date: December 25, 2017
- Running time: 110 minutes
- Country: Philippines
- Language: Filipino
- Box office: ₱56 million

Haunted Forest is a 2017 Filipino supernatural horror film directed by Ian Loreños, and starring Jane Oineza, Maris Racal, Jameson Blake and Jon Lucas. It is the second installment in the Haunted film series, following Haunted Mansion in 2015. The film follows a teenager who moves to a rural town with her estranged policeman father, where she encounters a supernatural presence deep inside a forest.

The film deals with supernatural mythical creatures: among them is the sitsit, a creature that preys on women at night and is believed to be the cause of sudden disappearances and deaths of women in the subject town.

Haunted Forest was released in Philippine cinemas as an official entry to the 43rd Metro Manila Film Festival, on December 25, 2017. A third film, Haunted Carnival, is scheduled to be released on December 25, 2026 at the 52nd Metro Manila Film Festival.

== Premise ==
The story revolves around Aris (Raymart Santiago) and his estranged daughter, Nica (Jane Oineza). When Aris was reassigned, he immediately starts on a case investigating a murder which is staged similarly to the death of a childhood friend that haunts him. While her father is away, Nica, her cousin and her local friends went for an outing where she started to get weird things happen to her. She tries to shake it off at first, but it gets worse day after day.

== Cast ==
=== Main cast ===
- Jane Oineza as Nica
- Jameson Blake as RJ
- Maris Racal as Mich
- Jon Lucas as Andre

=== Supporting cast ===
- Raymart Santiago as Aris
- Joey Marquez as Nardo
- Jerald Napoles as Voltron
- Myrtle Sarrosa as Lorena
- Miho Nishida
- Betong Sumaya
- Beverly Salviejo as Merly
- Fiona Yang
- Kelvin Miranda

== Production ==
Haunted Forest was produced under Regal Films and is directed by Ian Loreños. Loreños described the direction of the film as a mixture of Regal Film's "usual style" on horror and his own take on the genre. He said that the production team decided to put more "organic horror" elements in the film aside from relying on scaring the audience by surprise while adding that the film had "story" and "lessons". He stated that his film as an all-in-one film being a horror, family story, and love story while making sure the film won't have the impression of being a "mishmash".

== Release ==
An official trailer for Haunted Forest was released by December 4, 2017. The film was premiered in cinemas on December 25, 2017, as one of the eight entries of the 2017 Metro Manila Film Festival.

== Reception ==
On January 4, 2018, Lily Monteverde of Regal Films was satisfied of the box office gross of the film despite describing the then undisclosed figure as "not overwhelming". It was later reported that the film grossed about ₱56 million and was the fourth most sold team during the official run of the 2017 Metro Manila Film Festival.

== See also ==
- List of ghost films
