= Siargao (film) =

2017 Filipino film by Paul Soriano

- Official theatrical poster
- Directed by: Paul Soriano
- Written by: Anj Pessumal
- Produced by: Paul Soriano
- Starring: Jericho Rosales; Erich Gonzales; Jasmine Curtis-Smith
- Cinematography: Odyssey Flores
- Edited by: Mark Victor
- Music by: Robbie Factoran; Ricardo Jugo
- Production company: Ten17P
- Distributed by: Solar Pictures
- Release date: December 25, 2017
- Running time: 108 minutes
- Country: Philippines
- Language: Filipino
- Box office: ₱80 million

Siargao is a 2017 Philippine surf romance film directed by Paul Soriano. Starring Jericho Rosales, Erich Gonzales, and Jasmine Curtis-Smith, it is produced under Soriano's own company Ten17P.

The film was commercially released in the Philippines on December 25, 2017, as part of the 43rd Metro Manila Film Festival, and was the festival's top multi-awarded entry having won seven of its twelve nominations: including 2nd Best Picture, Best Director (Soriano), Best Cinematography, Best Sound, and Best Editing.

== Plot ==
Diego, a burned-out musician, returns to his hometown in Siargao to escape his troubles in the city. He meets Laura, a sheltered YouTuber who is picking herself up after a failed relationship, when they are seated beside each other on the plane ride to Siargao. Upon arrival on the island, Laura realizes that she has no means of transportation to her reserved lodgings, and so Diego offers to give her a ride on his friend's Jeep. Along the journey, they get to know each other's backgrounds and learn each other's purpose for going to Siargao.

In their respective residences, the real reasons for their getaway are revealed: Diego is returning home after experiencing unhappiness and dissatisfaction in Manila as an artist, stemming from his regret over leaving his hometown sweetheart Abi, whom he has always loved but had never gotten the timing right to be with. Laura, on the other hand, is trying to discover her independence after rejecting the marriage proposal of her ex-boyfriend, Mikey, whom she still loves but is afraid to commit to in marriage. In one of the many heartfelt conversations Laura and Diego participate in, she asks Diego what his favorite flavor of popcorn is, and divulges that she does not know the answer to the question herself, as she had spent all of her time in her relationship trying to mold her interests to mirror Mikey's.

As Diego rekindles his connection with Abi through surfing and Laura continues to film her experiences in Siargao, the two find understanding and support in each other's woes. Diego and Abi hash out their still existing feelings for each other, with Abi revealing that even if she loves Diego, she cannot be with him if he wants to return to the city, as she is used to and does not want to leave her simple life in Siargao. Laura watches Mikey's livestream about his and Laura's breakup, tearfully sharing his willingness to give Laura the world and being turned down, and that Laura has been trying to keep in touch, to no avail, as Mikey does not see the point when it had been her who had left him.

After a conversation between Diego and Laura where they agree that no matter the setbacks, mistakes, and disappointments, they have to keep on living and pushing for those they truly love, Diego holds a public performance for the locals where he dedicates a song to Abi that he wrote about her years prior, while Laura decides that after spending some time in Siargao by herself trying to figure out if she can and deserves to be alone, she ultimately refuses to be and attempts to contact Mikey again, finally reaching him via phone call after weeks of estrangement.

Diego, on his way back to Manila, sees Laura on the plane once again, and decides to stay permanently in Siargao to pursue a long-desired relationship with Abi. Laura lands in Manila, and is met at the airport by Mikey where the two hug.

== Cast ==
Main

- Jericho Rosales as Diego
- Erich Gonzales as Laura
- Jasmine Curtis-Smith as Abi

Supporting

- Luke Landrigan as Edong
- Suzette Ranillo as Diego's mom
- Mica Javier as Karen
- Wilmar Melindo as Wilmar
- Roxanne Barcelo as Belay
- Will Devaughn as Tommy
- Wil Dasovich as Oliver

Special participation

- Enchong Dee as Mikey

Cameo appearances

- Franco as Performer
- Reese Lansangan
- Bret Maverick-Higham as Johnny

== Production ==
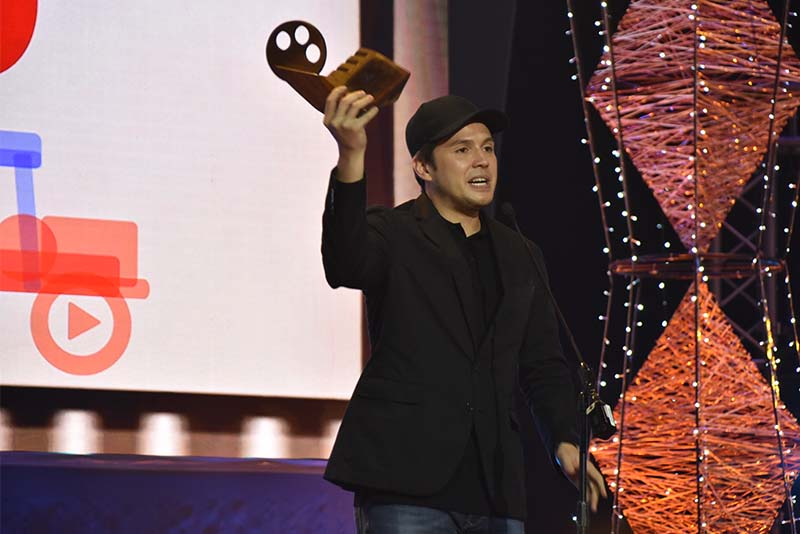
Paul Soriano directed the film, who was later named Best Director at the 2017 Metro Manila Film Festival.

Siargao was directed by Paul Soriano under his production company, Ten17P. The film was set and filmed in Siargao island. Soriano described the premise of his film as a story of "finding and losing yourself, and falling in and out of love".

Soriano went to Surigao del Norte province to inform government officials of his plans to shoot a film in the province's island. Soriano planned to start principal photography in April after the Holy Week observances. Filming wrapped in August 2017. The production team and cast stayed in Siargao for at least six weeks during film shoot.

== Release ==
A minute-long trailer of Siargao was officially released by October 2017 with no definite release date announced at that time.

The film was commercially released in the Philippines on December 25, 2017, as part of the 43rd Metro Manila Film Festival.

== Reception ==
=== Box office ===
Siargao sold about ₱80 million during the official run of the 2017 Metro Manila Film Festival making it the third most successful film in the film festival in terms of box office gross behind Ang Panday and Gandarrapiddo: The Revenger Squad.

=== Accolades ===
List of accolades
Award / Film Festival	Category	Recipient(s)	Result
2017 Metro Manila Film Festival
2017 Metro Manila Film Festival	Best Director	Paul Soriano	Won
2017 Metro Manila Film Festival	Best Actress in a Leading Role	Erich Gonzales	Nominated
2017 Metro Manila Film Festival	Best Actress in a Supporting Role	Jasmine Curtis-Smith	Won
2017 Metro Manila Film Festival	Best Actor in a Leading Role	Jericho Rosales	Nominated
2017 Metro Manila Film Festival	Best Screenplay	Siargao	Nominated
2017 Metro Manila Film Festival	Best Cinematography	Siargao	Won
2017 Metro Manila Film Festival	Best Sound	Siargao	Won
2017 Metro Manila Film Festival	Best Production Design	Jericho Rosales	Nominated
2017 Metro Manila Film Festival	Best Theme Song	"Alon" by Hale	Won
2017 Metro Manila Film Festival	Best Editing	Siargao	Won

== See also ==
- Apocalypse Child
