= Deadma Walking =

- Directed by: Julius Alfonso
- Written by: Eric Cabahug
- Produced by: Rex A. Tiri
- Starring: Edgar Allan Guzman; Joross Gamboa
- Cinematography: Lee Briones
- Edited by: Vanessa de Leon
- Music by: Von de Guzman
- Production company: T-Rex Entertainment
- Distributed by: OctoArts Films
- Release date: December 25, 2017
- Running time: 109 minutes
- Country: Philippines
- Language: Filipino
- Box office: ₱26 million

Deadma Walking is a 2017 Philippine comedy - drama musical film, directed by Julius Alfonso.

The film is about a terminally ill gay man who fakes his own death to attend his own wake to hear his friends views on him.

The film, based on a Palanca Award-winning screenplay, was commercially released in the Philippines on December 25, 2017, as part of the 43rd Metro Manila Film Festival.

== Plot ==
The film begins with a casket, opening up and a man takes a selfie of him, and told himself that he's an ugly dead man. John Samson, is about to record a video message to his friend Mark Caramat, who is also a theater actor. However, John has been diagnosed with cancer and has only one to two years to live. He tried several treatments, but to no avail. When John told Mark about his condition, he became devastated. John then suggests to fake his death and have a played wake and funeral. Mark refused to help him, but in the end he decided to help him. The plan is that John and Mark would go on a vacation in a resort. On the night of the vacation, John would die in his sleep. But, they would use a dead body to look like John really died. He doesn't want to be buried, but to be cremated. But he doesn't want his ashes to be buried, but rather scatter his ashes in the sea. In the wake, he wanted to have a different funeral decorations daily. As John's condition worsen, they decided to go with their plan. He also told Mark that when he dies, he will give to him his laundromat business and water refilling station. At the day 1 of his mock wake, John disguised himself as Yolly Redgrave, a transgender woman. In his wake, different people gave their eulogies to John. On the second day, John's older sister Mary came unexpectedly. She attempted to open the casket, but Mark tried to stop her until he fainted. They decided to lock the casket to prevent it from opening. On the third day, John's bestfriend Luke came and said his eulogy. He said that he's thankful to John because he'd became a good friend to him. As a reward, John gave Mark a trip for two to Maldives. On the fourth and final day, Mark gave his eulogy to John. Joseph, visits the wake. Joseph met Mark at a bathhouse. But it was raided and he sought help of John. John then met Joseph. Six months after, Joseph and Mark broke up. There, Joseph told Mark that he and John had an affair. But, John broke up with him because he didn't want to hurt his friend. Because of what happened, their friendship ended. The remains of the fake John was cremated. Yolly came to Mary and confessed that she is really John. John attended the stage play of Mark. But, Mark didn't mind the gift from John. Until Mark texted John about the trip to Maldives. John replied that he will not go if he's not with him. After a party with his fellow stage actors, Mark met his death in a vehicular accident. This left John devastated and mourning. Mary and John who is disguised as Yolly visit the wake of Mark. She then gave a video message for Mark. The message is a farewell message of John to Mark.

Then, Mary and Mark's mother attended the blessing of the fashion boutique. This was the business that inherited to Mark from John. A voiceover of John congratulating Mark for fulfilling his dream and told him that even in the afterlife, they're still a diva. Mary and Mark's mother looked at the pictures of John and Mark, indicating that John also passed away. Then the voices of John and Mark said "Once a diva, always a diva".

== Cast ==
=== Main cast ===
- Edgar Allan Guzman as Mark "Crying Diva" Caramat

He is the best friend of John.

- Joross Gamboa as John "Dying Diva" Samson/Yolly Redgrave

John Samson: He is a terminally ill gay man who fakes his own death. He is also known as "Migs," short for amiga, Spanish word for "female friend."
Yolly Redgrave: She is the disguise of John in order to attend his own funeral.

=== Supporting cast ===
- Candy Pangilinan as Martha
- Nico Antonio
- Dimples Romana as Mary

She is the only sister of John. Mary had misunderstandings between his brother John as she was not able to go home when their mother died.

- Gerald Anderson as Luke
- Vin Abrenica as Joseph
- Eugene Domingo as the leading lady on the fictional French film Au Revoir
- Bobby Andrews as doctor

=== Cameo appearances ===
- Iza Calzado
- Joseph Bitangcol as policeman
- Piolo Pascual
- Kiray Celis
- Sue Ramirez
- Princess Velasco
- Bing Pimentel as Elizabeth Samson
- Lloyd Samartino as Samson Samson
- Joel Lamangan

== Production ==
Deadma Walking was directed by Julius Alfonso and produced under T-Rex Productions. Eric Cabahug began writing the screenplay of the film in 2014, predating Die Beautiful another film which Deadma Walking has been compared to by two years. Alfonso sees his film as with "more heart" than Die Beautiful and remarks that "the character doesn’t really die" in Deadma Walking while the protagonist in the other film "really dies".

The screenplay of the film won second prize of the Carlos Palanca Memorial Awards for Literature in 2016.

== Release ==
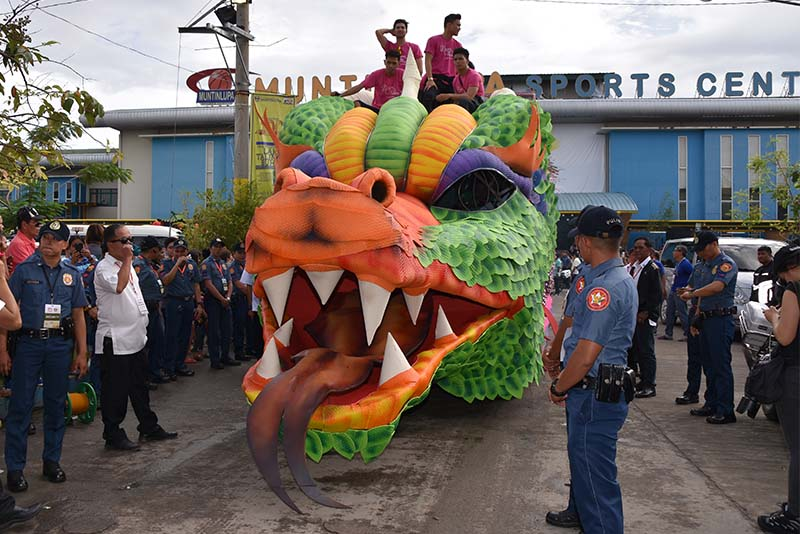
Float of Dead Walking at the MMFF Parade of the Stars.

The film was commercially released in the Philippines on December 25, 2017, as part of the 43rd Metro Manila Film Festival.

== Reception ==
=== Box office ===
Deadma Walking garnered a total of ₱26 million box office gross during the official run of the 2017 Metro Manila Film Festival.
