= Derek Ramsay =

Filipino actor and model (born 1976)

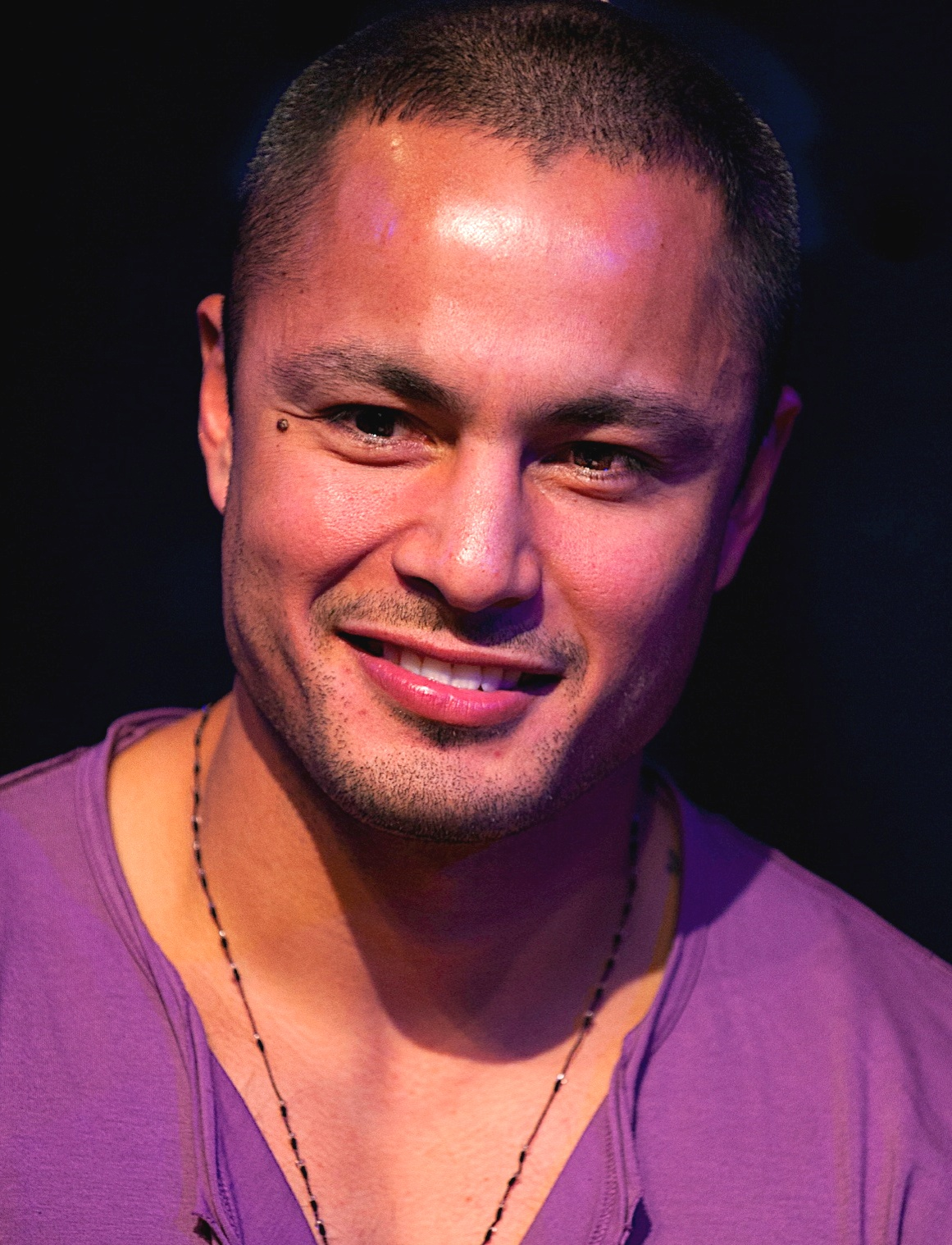
- Ramsay in 2010
- Born: Derek Arthur Ramsay Jr. December 7, 1976 (age 49); Enfield, England, United Kingdom
- Citizenship: Philippines; United Kingdom
- Occupations: Actor; model; television host; VJ; athlete
- Years active: 1997–present
- Agent(s): Sparkle GMA Artist Center (2001–2004; 2019–2022; hiatus for leave of absence); Viva Artists Agency (2011–2021); Regal Entertainment (2015–2021)
- Spouses: Mary Christine Jolly (m. 2002; ann. 2020) Ellen Adarna (m. 2021; sep. 2025)
- Children: 2
- Sports career
- Country: Philippines
- Sport: Basketball; golf; ultimate
- Team: Boracay Dragons (ultimate)
- Basketball career

Career history
- 2004: Toyota Otis–Letran Knights
- 2019–2020: Batangas City Athletics

Derek Arthur Ramsay Jr. (born December 7, 1976) is a Filipino model, actor, and television host. He had an exclusive contract with GMA Network. In 2022, Ramsay froze his contract with GMA Network. Since then, he has been inactive in show business to focus on his personal life.

== Early life and education ==
Derek Arthur Ramsay Jr. was born on December 7, 1976, in Enfield, England, and he was raised in the Philippines for most of his childhood.

His Filipina mother, Remedios Paggao, was the head of the housekeeping unit of 11 Cadogan Gardens in London, and his British father, Derek Arthur Ramsay Sr., was an inspector for the Metropolitan Police Service stationed at Scotland Yard.

He was educated in the Philippines at Maria Montessori High School and at a boarding school in England. He studied for an undergraduate degree in marketing in New Hampshire and Boston.

== Career ==
=== Modelling ===
Early in the 2000s, Ramsay found work as an MTV VJ, a model, as well as TV commercial actor.

=== Television and film ===
Ramsay first came into wider public attention in Eat Bulaga! as a co-host of the segment Pool Watch from 2001 to 2004 on GMA Network.

In April 2012, he signed a three-year contract and transferred to TV5.

His first show on TV5 was The Amazing Race Philippines, which he hosted. After his contract expired in February 2015, he signed another three-year contract with TV5 on 28 April 2015.

After months of speculations about network transfer, Ramsay returned to GMA Network and signed a five-year exclusive contract with the network on 3 April 2019. He started in the network as a co-host of Eat Bulaga! from 2001 to 2004. His first comeback Kapuso project was The Better Woman that garnered high ratings aired in 2019.

In 2020, he was supposed to topbill a project Kapuso project entitled Sanggang Dikit, however, because of the pandemic, the production was halted. In 2022, he received an offer to do with To Love and To Hold, but he declined the role due to lock-in taping.

In January 2022, Ramsay and GMA Network have agreed that the actor would take an "indefinite leave" and "freeze the contract" from showbiz so Ramsay can focus on family matters.

Ramsay's acting career has been characterized as a hiatus that lasted for six years. Ramsay did however appear in the 2023 film, Kampon.

Ramsay announced his return to acting in television in January 2026 at the storycon for the upcoming series The Kingdom: Magkabilang Mundo, the sequel for the film The Kingdom. He was to portray Rajah Siyam, a new character which did not appear in the 2024 film. However the project was cancelled.

=== Sports ===
==== Basketball ====
Ramsay also played basketball competitively. In 2004, he played for the Toyota Otis–Letran Knights in the now-defunct Philippine Basketball League. He made his return to the sport, after joining the Batangas City Athletics of the Maharlika Pilipinas Basketball League (MPBL) for the 2019–20 MPBL Lakan Season. He debuted for the team in Batangas' 80–67 win against the Caloocan Supremos in July 2019.

==== Beach soccer ====
Ramsay was the head ambassador of the Philippine national beach soccer team, and was set to participate in the 2013 FIFA Beach Soccer World Cup Asian qualifiers, but ultimately did not because of his commitment to Kidlat, where he played the lead role.

==== Golf ====
He also played golf at an amateur level. He took up the sport he took up after his involvement in the 2014 film Trophy Wife. Along with John Estrada, Ramsay won the 2017 Jack Nicklaus International Invitational, a recreational golf tournament in Dublin, Ohio.

==== Ultimate ====
Ramsay was part of the Philippines national ultimate frisbee team from 2012 to 2017. He was the ninth top scorer at the 13th World Ultimate and Guts Championship 2012. He represented the Philippines again as part of the Boracay Dragons in the 2017 World Championships of Beach Ultimate. In January 2026, Ramsay returned to playing ultimate and joined a tournament.

== Personal life ==
Ramsay was married to Mary Christine Jolly from 2002 to 2020, having separated after five months of dating. They have a son together. Ramsay married fellow actor Ellen Adarna on November 11, 2021. Ramsay revealed on December 11, 2023, that Adarna had a miscarriage. He and Adarna are coparenting her son with John Lloyd Cruz. Adarna gave birth to a child with Ramsay in October 2024.

== Filmography ==
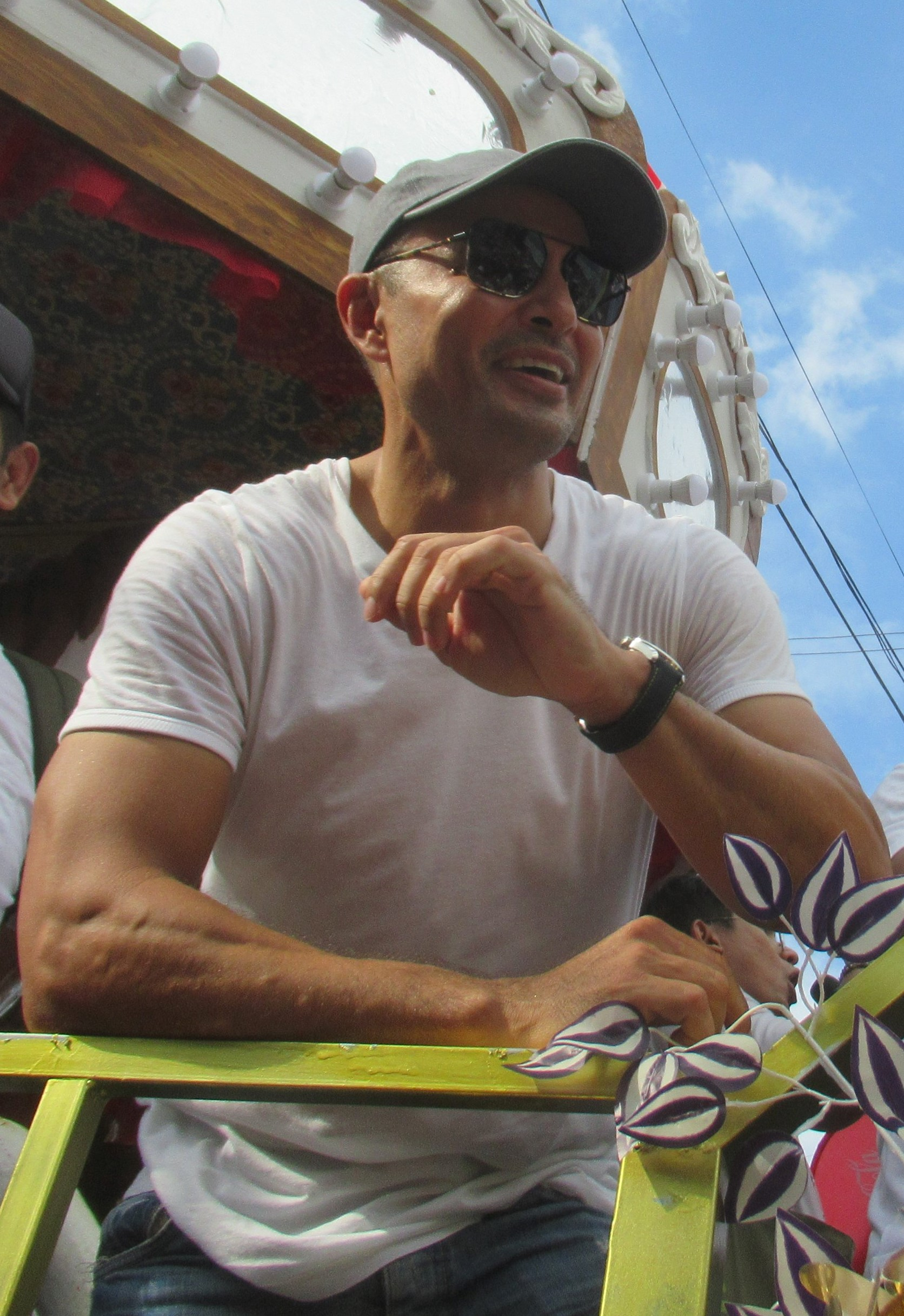
Ramsay in Kampon

=== Film ===
Year	Title	Role
2006	Kasal Kasali Kasalo	Ronnie
2006	One More Chance	Mark
2007	Sakal, Sakali, Saklolo	Ronnie
2009	T2	Jeremy
2009	And I Love You So	Oliver Cruz
2009	I Love You, Goodbye	Gary Angeles
2011	No Other Woman	Ram Escaler
2011	The Unkabogable Praybeyt Benjamin	Brandon Estolas
2012	Corazon: Ang Unang Aswang	Daniel
2012	A Secret Affair	Anton
2014	Trophy Wife	Chino
2014	The Janitor	Dindo Marasigan
2014	English Only, Please	Jeremy
2015	Ex with Benefits	Adam Jacob Castrences
2015	Etiquette for Mistresses	Arthur Clemente
2015	All You Need Is Pag-ibig	Dom
2016	Love Is Blind	Wade Santillan
2016	The Escort	Xyruz
2016	My Candidate	Sonny Suarez
2016	Pangil Sa Tubig	Marlon
2017	All of You	Gab
2018	Kasal	Wado Dela Costa
2018	The Girl in the Orange Dress	Ethan
2019	Mga Mata Sa Dilim	Borgy
2023	Kampon	Clark

=== Television ===
Year	Title	Role
2001–2004	One Piece Season 1!	Usopp Voice actor
2005–2006	Ang Panday: Book 1&2	Kahimu
2005–2006	Entertainment Konek	Himself/host
2006	Your Song: Wish	Mark
2006	Super Inggo	Louie/Machete
2006	Maalaala Mo Kaya: Love Letter	Abner
2006–2007	U Can Dance	Himself/host
2007	Your Song: Kailan Kaya	Migs
2007	Your Song: Never Knew Love Like This Before	Eric
2007	Ysabella	Mito Valenzuela
2007	Your Song: Never Knew Love Like This Before	Eric
2007	Your Song: Upside Down	Ricky
2007	Maging Sino Ka Man: Ang Pagbabalik	Joaquin Delos Santos
2008	Maalaala Mo Kaya: Mansyon	Chris
2008	Maalaala Mo Kaya: Isda	Buboy
2009	Your Song: Open Arms	Raphael
2009	Your Song: Feb-ibig	Ralph
2009	Precious Hearts Romances Presents: Ang Lalaking Nagmahal Sa Akin	Zephyrus "Zephy" McNally
2009	Komiks Presents: Nasaan Ka Maruja?	Rodrigo Santiago / Ross Lozano
2009	Maalaala Mo Kaya: Boarding House	Richard
2009	The Wedding	Warren Garcintorena / Philip Garcintorena
2010	Habang May Buhay	Samuel David Corpuz / David Briones
2010	Magkaribal	Louie Villamor
2011	Your Song Presents: Kim	Ariel
2012	The Amazing Race Philippines	Host
2013	Kidlat	Voltaire Megaton / Kidlat
2013	Undercover	Roy Velasco
2013	For Love or Money	Edward
2013	Let's Ask Pilipinas	Himself
2014	The Amazing Race Philippines 2	Host
2015	Mac & Chiz	Mac Vasquez
2015	Extreme Series: Kaya Mo Ba 'To?	Host
2018	Brillante Mendoza's Amo	Rodrigo Macaraeg
2019	The Better Woman	Andrew de Villa

== Awards and nominations ==
Year	Award-Giving Body	Category	Work	Result
2009	35th Metro Manila Film Festival	Best Actor	I Love You, Goodbye	Nominated
2010	12th Gawad PASADO Awards	Pinakapasadong Katuwang na Aktor	I Love You, Goodbye	Won
2011	25th PMPC Star Awards for TV	Best Drama Actor	Magkaribal	Nominated
2011	ENPRESS Golden Screen TV Awards	Outstanding Performance by an Actor in a Drama Series	Magkaribal	Nominated
2012	28th PMPC Star Awards for Movies	Mr. Great Shape Personality	—N/a	Won
2012	28th PMPC Star Awards for Movies	Male Face of the Night	—N/a	Won
2012	28th PMPC Star Awards for Movies	Movie Actor of the Year	No Other Woman	Nominated
2012	GMMSF Box-Office Entertainment Awards	Box-Office King	No Other Woman	Won
2012	30th Luna Awards	Best Actor	No Other Woman	Nominated
2012	60th FAMAS Awards	Best Actor	No Other Woman	Nominated
2013	61st FAMAS Awards	Best Actor	A Secret Affair	Nominated
2014	40th Metro Manila Film Festival	Best Actor	English Only, Please	Won
2015	31st PMPC Star Awards for Movies	Movie Actor of the Year	English Only, Please	Nominated
2015	17th Gawad PASADO Awards	PinakaPASADOng Actor	English Only, Please	Nominated
2017	43rd Metro Manila Film Festival	Best Actor	All of You	Won
2017	43rd Metro Manila Film Festival	Male Star of the Night	—N/a	Won
2018	34th PMPC Star Awards for Movies	Movie Actor of the Year	All of You	Nominated
2023	49th Metro Manila Film Festival	Best Actor	Kampon	Nominated
