= All of You (2017 film) =

- Theatrical release poster
- Directed by: Dan Villegas
- Screenplay by: Dan Villegas; Carl Chavez; Mae Chua
- Story by: Dan Villegas; Paul Sta. Ana
- Produced by: Enrique Henares; Josabeth Alonso; Edgardo Mangahas
- Starring: Jennylyn Mercado; Derek Ramsay
- Cinematography: Dexter dela Peña
- Edited by: Marya Ignacio
- Music by: Emerzon Texon
- Production companies: Quantum Films; MJM Productions; Globe Studios; Planet A Media Productions
- Distributed by: Quantum Films
- Release date: December 25, 2017
- Running time: 103 minutes
- Country: Philippines
- Language: Filipino
- Box office: ₱34 million

All of You is a 2017 Philippine romantic comedy film directed by Dan Villegas and starring Jennylyn Mercado and Derek Ramsay. It is produced and released by Quantum Films, MJM Productions and serves as an official entry to the 2017 Metro Manila Film Festival.

The film revolves around two strangers who met each other through a mobile app.

In 2019, the film is now being streamed on Netflix as of January 19, 2019.

== Cast ==
- Jennylyn Mercado as Gabby
- Derek Ramsay as Gab
- Yayo Aguila
- Kean Cipriano
- Nico Antonio
- Enzo Marcos
- Via Antonio
- Hannah Ladesma
- Milo Elmido Jr.
- Kelvin Yu
- Sam Milby
- Rafael Rosell
- Solenn Heussaff

== Release ==
The first trailer for All of You was released on November 15, 2017 which also featured a "Dying Inside" cover by Darren Espanto. The film had its commercial release on December 25, 2017 as one of the eight entries at the 2017 Metro Manila Film Festival.

== Reception ==
=== Box office ===
All of You collected ₱34 million of box office gross during the official run of the 2017 Metro Manila Film Festival. It is the sixth most sold film among eight entries during the film festival.

=== Critical response ===
Critic Fred Hawson whose review on All of You got republished by ABS-CBN News described the film as "generic" and "had nothing new to offer" remarking other recent films at that time romantic drama genre had a gimmick to make themselves stand out such as Kita Kita, 100 Tula Para Kay Stella, 12, Changing Partners. Hawson expressed his puzzlement of the fact that the film was given the Best Screenplay Award at the MMFF Awards though he commended the performances of Jennylyn Mercado and Derek Ramsay. Oggs Cruz of Rappler labeled the film as a "missed opportunity" and criticized the direction of the plot which he says "tries too hard to navigate a relationship towards a happy ending that just doesn’t feel justified" though he commended the performance of Mercado and Ramsay as well as the technical aspects of the film especially the lighting.
