= Changing Partners (film) =

2017 musical comedy-drama film by Dan Villegas

- Theatrical film poster
- Directed by: Dan Villegas
- Written by: Vincent de Jesus; Lilit Reyes
- Based on: Changing Partners (musical play) by Vincent de Jesus
- Produced by: Antoinette Jadaone; Dan Villegas
- Starring: Agot Isidro; Jojit Lorenzo; Sandino Martin; Anna Luna
- Cinematography: Mycko David
- Edited by: Marya Ignacio
- Music by: Vincent de Jesus
- Production companies: Cinema One Originals; ABS-CBN Film Productions; Project 8 Projects
- Distributed by: ABS-CBN Film Productions
- Release dates: November 14, 2017 (Cinema One Originals Film Festival); January 31, 2018 (Commercial release)
- Running time: 92 minutes
- Country: Philippines
- Languages: Filipino; English
- Budget: US$100,000

Changing Partners is a 2017 Filipino independent musical drama film directed by Dan Villegas, starring Agot Isidro, Jojit Lorenzo, Sandino Martin, and Anna Luna. Based on the Palanca Award-winning musical play by Vincent de Jesus, the adaptation tells the story of couple Alex and Cris–their love relationship and at the period of breaking up. The film tells the story in four gender bending relationship variations.

The film premiered on November 14, 2017 at the 2017 Cinema One Originals Film Festival, where it receive eight awards, including Best Director, Best Music, and Best Editing. It was commercially released by Star Cinema on January 31, 2018, in selected theaters nationwide.

== Cast ==
- Agot Isidro as Alex
- Jojit Lorenzo as Alex
- Sandino Martin as Cris
- Anna Luna as Cris

Nicco Manalo and Vincent de Jesus also made their cameo appearances in the film.

== Soundtrack ==
The soundtrack album was digitally released via iTunes on June 1, 2017. The pop version of the soundtrack was released by Star Music on January 26, 2018. It features Jona, KZ Tandingan, Daryl Ong, and Khalil Ramos respectively.

Changing Partners – Standard edition^{CP}
No.	Title	Performer(s)	Length
1.	"Madaling Magsalita"	Agot Isidro; Jojit Lorenzo; Anna Luna; Sandino Martin	6:24
2.	"Yung Pakiramdam"	Isidro; Lorenzo	3:31
3.	"Nakatitig Lang Siya Sa Akin"	Lorenzo; Martin	4:05
4.	"Sa Mga Salita Pa Lamang Niya"	Martin; Luna	2:40
5.	"Ano Pa Ba Ang Gusto Niya?"	Isidro; Lorenzo; Luna; Martin	3:07
6.	"Hanggang Sa Kinaya Ng Puso Ko"	Martin; Luna	3:33
7.	"Maleta"	Isidro; Lorenzo; Luna; Martin	5:06
Total length:			27:46

Changing Partners – Original Motion Picture Soundtrack [Pop Version]
No.	Title	Performer(s)	Length
1.	"Yung Pakiramdam"	Viray	3:34
2.	"Sa Mga Salita Pa Lamang Niya"	Tandingan	2:40
3.	"Hanggang Sa Kinaya Ng Puso Ko"	Ong	3:39
4.	"Maleta"	Ramos	4:22
Total length:			13:35

^{CP}The tracks consist of seven songs played throughout the film and the theater play.

== Release ==
Changing Partners was screened at the 2018 CinemAsia Film Festival in Amsterdam, Netherlands.

The film was released and made available to stream on Apple TV and IWantTFC respectively.

== Awards and nominations ==
Year	Association	Award	Category	Nominee	Result	Source
2017	Cinema One Originals	13th Cinema One Originals Film Festival	Best Music	Vincent de Jesus	Won	
2017	Cinema One Originals	13th Cinema One Originals Film Festival	Best Editing	Marya Ignacio	Won	
2017	Cinema One Originals	13th Cinema One Originals Film Festival	Best Director	Dan Villegas	Won	
2017	Cinema One Originals	13th Cinema One Originals Film Festival	Best Actor	Jojit Lorenzo	Won	
2017	Cinema One Originals	13th Cinema One Originals Film Festival	Best Actress	Agot Isidro	Won	
2017	Cinema One Originals	13th Cinema One Originals Film Festival	Best Ensemble Acting	Changing Partners	Won	
2017	Cinema One Originals	13th Cinema One Originals Film Festival	Audience Choice Award	Changing Partners	Won	
2017	Cinema One Originals	13th Cinema One Originals Film Festival	Champion Bughaw	Marya Ignacio	Won	
2018	34th Philippine Movie Press Club (PMPC)	Star Awards for Movies	Indie Movie of the Year	Changing Partners	Won	
2018	34th Philippine Movie Press Club (PMPC)	Star Awards for Movies	Best Indie Director	Dan Villegas	Won	
2018	34th Philippine Movie Press Club (PMPC)	Star Awards for Movies	Best Screenwriter for Indie Movie	Lilit Reyes and Vincent de Jesus	Won	
2018	34th Philippine Movie Press Club (PMPC)	Star Awards for Movies	Indie Movie Editor of the Year	Marya Ignacio	Won	
2018	34th Philippine Movie Press Club (PMPC)	Star Awards for Movies	Indie Movie Musical Scorer of the Year	Vincent de Jesus	Won	
