= Meant to Beh =

- Theatrical release poster
- Directed by: Chris Martinez
- Produced by: Orlando Ilacad; Marvic Sotto; Antonio P. Tuviera
- Starring: Vic Sotto; Dawn Zulueta
- Music by: Jesse Lucas
- Production companies: OctoArts Films; M-Zet Productions; APT Entertainment
- Distributed by: OctoArts Films
- Release date: December 25, 2017
- Country: Philippines
- Language: Filipino
- Box office: ₱81 million (worldwide)

Meant to Beh is a 2017 Philippine family comedy film directed by Chris Martinez and starring Vic Sotto and Dawn Zulueta.

It was distributed and produced by OctoArts Films, M-Zet Productions and APT Entertainment and served as an official entry to the 2017 Metro Manila Film Festival. The movie also marks the reunion of Zulueta and Sotto, 22 years after working together in the fantasy series Okay Ka, Fairy Ko! way back in 1995.

== Cast ==
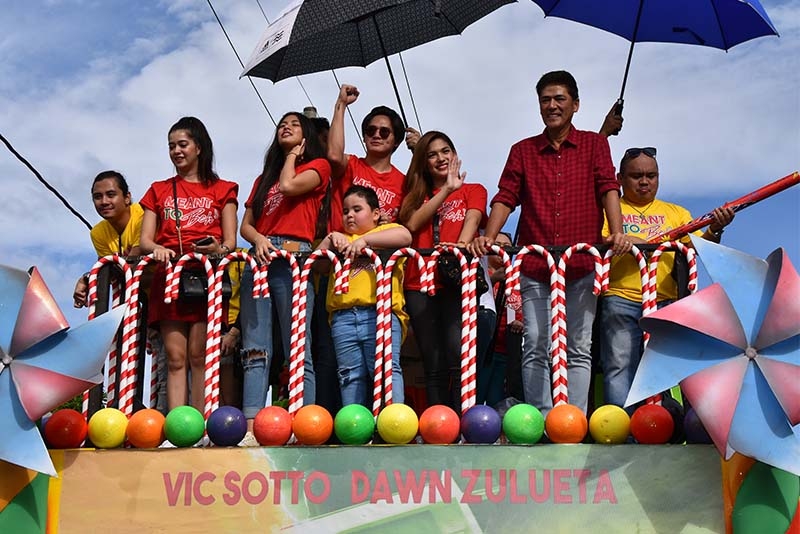
Cast of Meant to Beh riding their movie float at the MMFF Parade of the Stars.

=== Main cast ===
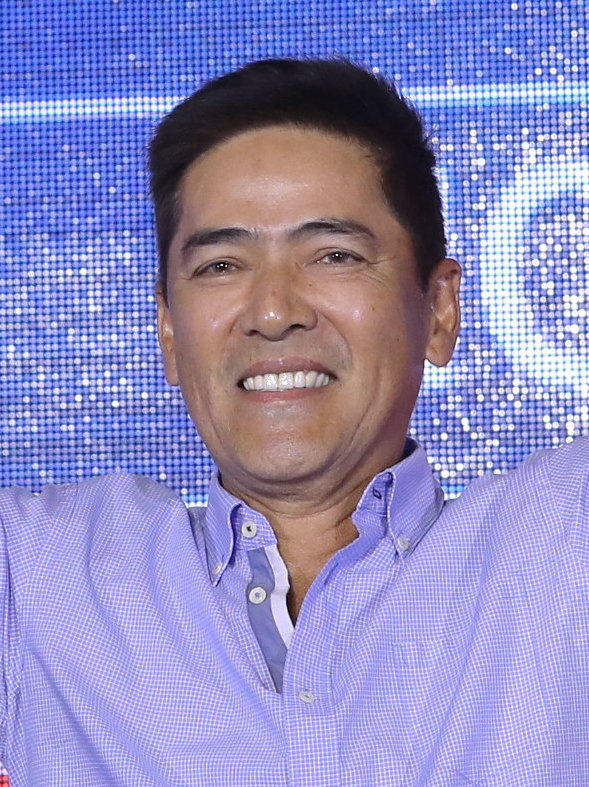
Vic Sotto, Portrays Ron Balatbat

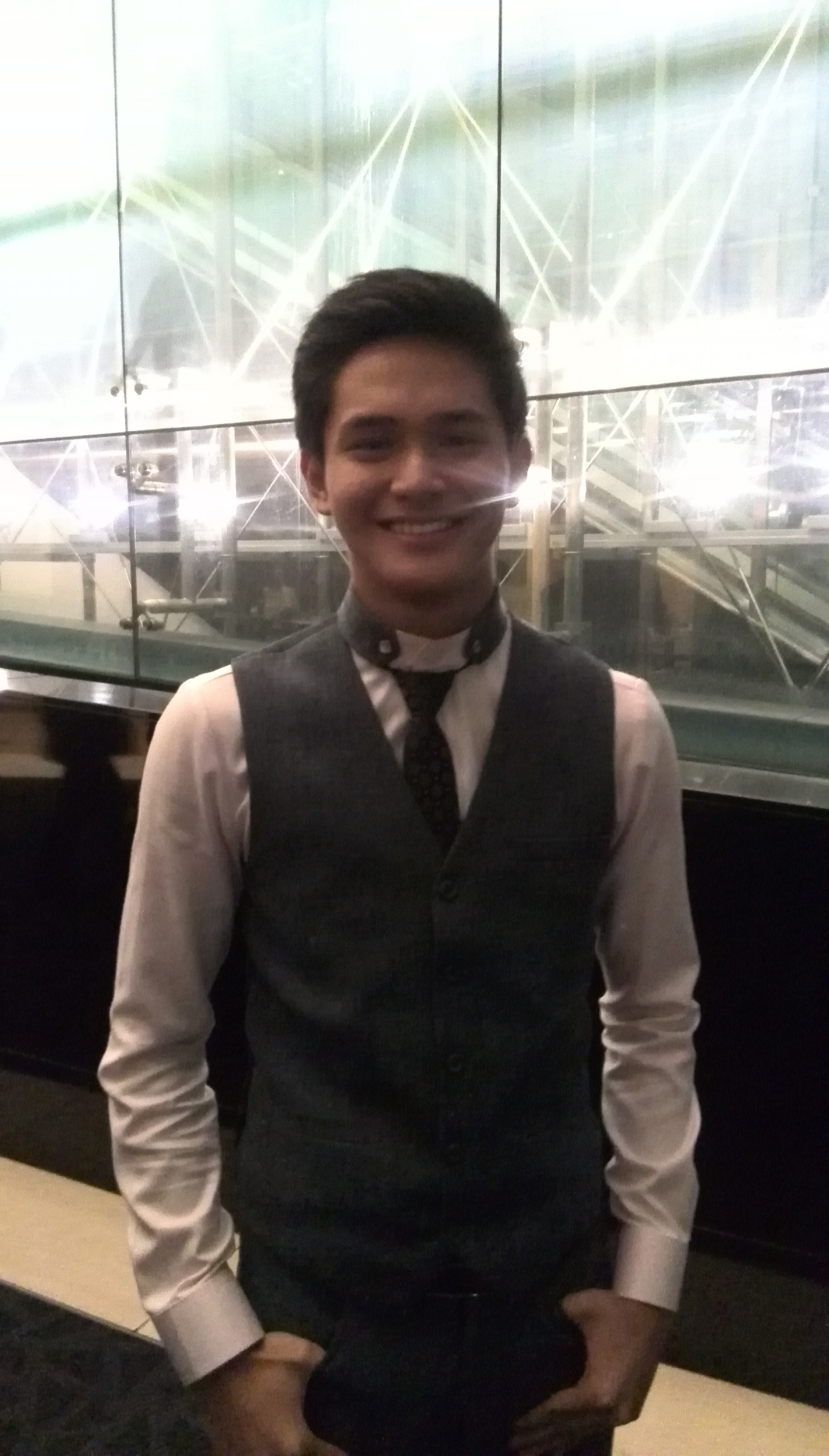
Ruru Madrid, Portrays Diego Bartolome

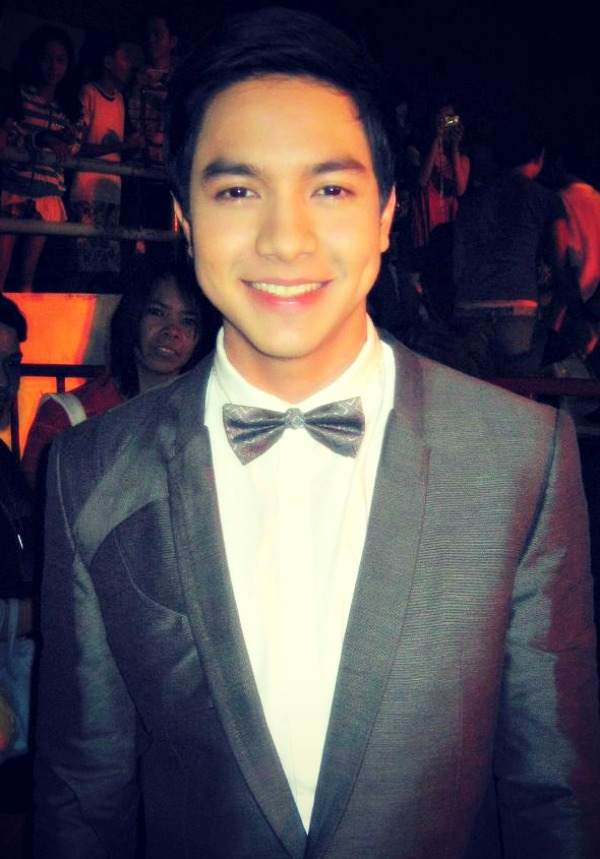
Alden Richards, as Cameo Role

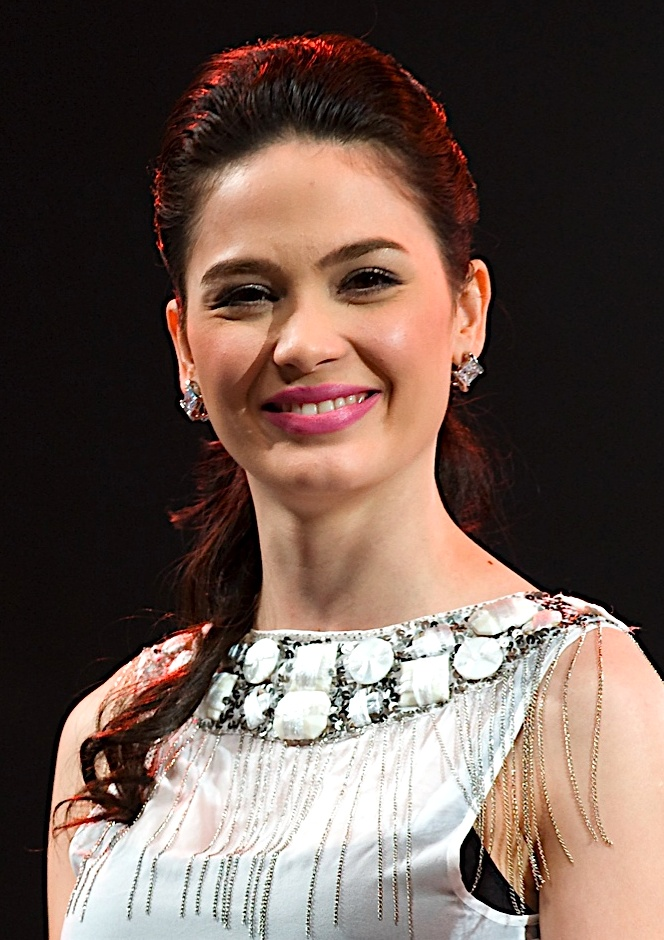
Kristine Hermosa, portrays as Young Andrea

- Vic Sotto as Ron Balatbat
- Dawn Zulueta as Andrea Balatbat

=== Supporting cast ===
- JC Santos as Christian Balatbat
- Daniel Matsunaga as Benjo Marasigan
- Sue Ramirez as Rihanna Biglang-awa
- Gabbi Garcia as Alexandra Balatbat
- Ruru Madrid as Diego Bartolome
- Andrea Torres as Agatha Bayona
- Baby Baste as Riley Balatbat

=== Special participation ===
- Alden Richards as Gruber passenger in a Cameo Role
- Maine Mendoza
- Kristine Hermosa-Sotto as young Andrea
- Oyo Sotto as young Ron
- Jose Manalo
- Wally Bayola
- Paolo Ballesteros
- Kitkat
- Roi Vinzon as Jake (Andrea's ex-boyfriend)
- Lharby Policarpio

== Production ==
=== Development ===
On August 15, 2017, a story conference was held announcing the movie and Vic Sotto's return to the Metro Manila Film Festival (MMFF) after skipping it for a year after his movie Enteng Kabisote 10 and the Abangers didn’t make it to last year’s lineup.

In the conference, Sotto said that he definitely missed doing the MMFF and he was glad that they were back. He also agrees with the rules of this year's festival to accommodate everyone regarding the line-up of combining mainstream movies and indie films in the magic 8 movies. For Sotto, the dichotomy is unnecessary because all of them are promoting the Filipino movie industry.

It is also a first for him doing a family movie genre far from his past movies which is concentrated on fantasy and action. Several artists from two rival networks ABS-CBN and GMA Network agreed to be part of the movie.

The film's former title was Love Traps: #FamilyGoals during the announcement of first four movies included in the MMFF 2017. On the day of story conference, it was revealed that the movie title was changed to Meant to Beh. Also with the director from Tony Y. Reyes to be replaced by Chris Martinez.

=== Filming ===
Principal photography for the film began in August 2017.

== Release ==
Meant to Beh premiered in Philippine cinemas on December 25, 2017 as one of the eight official entries of the 2017 Metro Manila Film Festival.

== Reception ==
=== Box office ===
Meant to Beh had the fifth biggest box office gross garnered during the official run of the 2017 Metro Manila Film Festival grossing about ₱51 million. This is the first time that a Vic Sotto film didn't make it to the top 4 box office films.

=== Critical response ===
The film received mixed to positive reviews from critics after its premiere. Matt Suzara of Lakwatsera Lovers commented that "Meant To Beh is a good film to watch with your family this Christmas Day. Vic Sotto finally got lose from the Enteng series and came up with a decent family-friendly picture that is worthy of your hard-earned money." According to Ace Antipolo of Movies For Millennials, compared to the past Vic Sotto movies that came before, the film was "an improvement over his past movies." Baby Baste's performance was also praised. He was "the biggest stand-out of the film... He is oozing with charm and confidence on screen and he definitely stole the show." The reviewer concluded that "Meant To Beh is an entertaining, family-friendly comedy that is too good to miss."
