= OctoArts Films =

Philippine film production company

- Logo as OctoArts Films used since 2017
- Type: Private
- Industry: Theatrical distribution film production marketing
- Founded: 1989; 37 years ago (original); January 1, 2003; 23 years ago (relaunched)
- Founder: Orlando R. Ilacad
- Defunct: February 3, 1999; 27 years ago (original)
- Headquarters: OctoArts Building, 108 Panay Avenue, Barangay South Triangle, Quezon City, Philippines
- Area served: Worldwide
- Products: Motion pictures

OctoArts Films (also known as OctoArts Films International for foreign films) is a Philippine film production and distribution company founded in 1989 by Orly R. Ilacad. A veteran record producer, Ilacad only decided to establish the film company when producer Simon Ongpin agreed to be its head.

Former OctoArts executive producer and musician, and Ilacad's brother Art (Artie) died from heart surgery complications on July 30, 2023.

In 2024, OctoArts Films established its YouTube channel making available online the movies they have produced and released since 1990. In addition, the production company also acquired some of the film libraries from defunct movie productions [CineSuerte, Moviestars Production (co-distributed with Solar Pictures with few exceptions), Four-N Films, Tagalog Ilang-Ilang Productions, Lea Productions, etc.] making them available also online.

== List of films ==
- Iputok Mo... Dadapa Ako! (Hard to Die) (1990)
- Mayor Latigo: Ang Barakong Alkalde ng Baras (1991)
- Valentin Zapanta Alyas Ninong: Huling Kilabot ng Tondo (1992)
- Totoy Buwang: Mad Killer ng Maynila (1992)
- Estribo Gang: The Jinggoy Sese Story (1992)
- Ali in Wonderland (1992)
- Primitivo Ebok Ala: Kalabang Mortal ni Baby Ama (1992)
- Boboy Salonga: Batang Tondo (1992)
- Working Students (1992)
- Ano Ba 'Yan? (1992)
- Bakit Labis Kitang Mahal (1992)
- Beloy Montemayor Jr.: Tirador ng Cebu (1993)
- Dahil Mahal Kita: The Dolzura Cortez Story (1993)
- Mama's Boys: Mga Praningning (1993)
- Ano Ba 'Yan 2 (1993)
- Paniwalaan Mo (1993)
- Loretta (1993)
- Dalawa Laban sa Mundo: Ang Siga at ang Beauty (1993)
- Victor Meneses: Dugong Kriminal (1993)
- Maestro Toribio: Sentensyador (1994)
- Bakit Ngayon Ka Lang (1994)
- Biboy Banal: Pagganti Ko... Tapos Kayo (1994)
- Koronang Itim (1994) with Prime Pictures
- Pwera Biro Mahal Kita: Da Beach Boys (1994)
- Manolo en Michelle: Hapi Together (1994)
- Elsa Castillo Story: Ang Katotohanan (1994)
- Mama's Boys 2: Let's Go Na! (1994)
- Si Ayala at si Zobel (1994) with Cinemax Studios and Viva Films
- Manila Girl: Ikaw ang Aking Panaginip (1995) with Prime Pictures
- Barkada Walang Atrasan (1995)
- Bunso: Isinilang Kang Palaban! (1995)
- Saan Ako Nagkamali (1995)
- Isko: Adventures in Animasia (1995)
- Muntik Nang Maabot ang Langit (1995) with Mahogany Pictures
- Maginoong Barumbado (1996) with RS Productions
- Tubusin Mo ng Bala ang Puso Ko (1996) with Cinemax Studios
- Leon Cordero: Duwag Lang ang Hahalik sa Lupa (1996) with Cinemax Studios
- Ben Balasador: Akin ang Huling Alas (1996) with Cinemax Studios
- Lab en Kisses (1996) with M-Zet Films and Cinemax Studios
- 'Wag Na 'Wag Kang Lalayo (1996) with Cinemax Studios
- Totoy Hitman: Batas Ko ang Hahatol (1996) with Cinemax Studios
- Rubberman (1996) with Cinemax Studios
- Bitoy ang Itawag Mo sa Akin (1997) with Cinemax Studios
- Bastardo (1997) with Cinemax Studios
- Malikot na Mundo (1997)
- Halik ng Vampira (1997) with Cinemax Studios
- Kamandag Ko ang Papatay sa Iyo (1997) with Cinemax Studios
- Frame Up: Ihahatid Kita sa Hukay (1997) with Cinemax Studios
- Selosa (1997)
- Kriselda Sabik Sa'yo (1997) with Canary Films
- Mapusok (1997) with Cinemax Studios
- Ang Kilabot At si Miss Pakipot (1998) with Canary Films
- Anting-Anting (1998) with GMA Films
- Guevarra: Sa Batas Ko, Walang Hari (1998) with GMA Films
- Sinaktan Mo ang Puso Ko (1998) with GMA Films
- May Sayad (1998) with GMA Films
- Marahas: Walang Kilalang Batas (1998) with GMA Films
- Armadong Hudas (1998) with GMA Films
- D' Sisters: Nuns of the Above (1999) with GMA Films and M-Zet Films
- Bakit Pa? (1999) with GMA Films
- Bestman: 4 Better, Not 4 Worse (2002) with Maverick Films
- Lastikman (2003)
- Fantastic Man (2003)
- Malikmata (2003) with Canary Films
- Enteng Kabisote: Okay ka, Fairy Ko: The Legend (2004)
- Spirit of the Glass (2004) with Canary Films
- Enteng Kabisote 2: Okay Ka Fairy Ko: The Legend Continues (2005)
- Kutob (2005) with Canary Films
- Enteng Kabisote 3: Okay Ka, Fairy Ko: The Legend Goes On and On and On (2006)
- Matakot Ka sa Karma (2006) with Canary Films
- Pasukob (2007)
- Enteng Kabisote 4: Okay Ka Fairy Ko...The Beginning of the Legend (2007)
- Iskul Bukol 20 Years After (2008) with APT Entertainment and M-Zet Productions
- Love on Line (LOL) (2009) with APT Entertainment and M-Zet Productions
- Ang Darling Kong Aswang (2009) with APT Entertainment and M-Zet Productions
- Here Comes the Bride (2010) with Star Cinema and Quantum Films
- Si Agimat at si Enteng Kabisote (2010) with GMA Pictures, APT Entertainment, Imus Productions, and M-Zet Productions
- Pak! Pak! My Dr. Kwak! (2011) with Star Cinema, APT Entertainment, and M-Zet Productions
- Wedding Tayo, Wedding Hindi (2011) with Star Cinema
- My House Husband: Ikaw Na! (2011) with GMA Pictures*uncredited
- Enteng Ng Ina Mo (2011) with Star Cinema, APT Entertainment, and M-Zet Productions
- Si Agimat, si Enteng Kabisote at si Ako (2012) with APT Entertainment, M-Zet Productions, Imus Productions, and GMA Films
- My Little Bossings (2013) with APT Entertainment, M-Zet Productions and Kris Aquino Productions
- My Big Bossing (2014) with APT Entertainment and M-Zet Productions
- My Bebe Love (2015) with GMA Pictures, APT Entertainment, MEDA Productions and M-Zet Productions
- Enteng Kabisote 10 and the Abangers (2016) with M-Zet Productions and APT Entertainment
- Spirit of the Glass: The Haunted (2017) with T-Rex Entertainment
- Barbi: D' Wonder Beki (2017) with M-Zet Productions and T-Rex Entertainment
- Meant to Beh (2017) with M-Zet Productions and APT Entertainment
- Deadma Walking (2017) with T-Rex Entertainment
- Through Night and Day (2018) with Viva Films
- Ang Pangarap Kong Holdap with Mavx Productions
- Nuuk (2019) with Viva Films and Mavx Productions
- Izla (2021) with Mavx Productions and ALV Films
- Without You (2023) with Mavx Productions and ALV Films
- Kampon with Quantum Films and Brightlight Productions
- Ang Pangarap Kong Oskars (2023)
