= Tu Pug Imatuy =

2017 Filipino drama film

- Directed by: Arnel Barbarona
- Produced by: Norhaiya Diabo Macusang; Milo Tolentino; Arnel Mardoquio; Arnel Barbarona
- Starring: Malona Sulatan; Jong Monzon; Luis Georlin Banaag III; Jamee Rivera; Jillian Khayle Barbarona
- Cinematography: Bryan Jimenez; Arnel Barbarona
- Edited by: Arbi Barbarona
- Music by: Arnel Barbarona
- Production companies: Red Motion Media; Kilab Multimedia; Yellow Kite Productions; Play Weaver Productions
- Distributed by: Solar Entertainment
- Release dates: 9 March 2017 (Sinag Maynila Film Festival); 26 October 2017 (Tokyo International Film Festival)
- Running time: 130 minutes
- Country: Philippines
- Language: Manobo

Tu Pug Imatuy (lit. 'The Right to Kill'; Japanese: 殺人の権利) is a 2017 Filipino drama film directed by Arnel Barbarona, produced by Red Motion Media and distributed by Solar Entertainment. The film stars Jong Monzon and Malona Sulatan in lead roles and had its world premiere at the 30th Tokyo International Film Festival on 26 October 2017. Inspired by actual events, the drama tackles the struggle of indigenous Manobos against environmental plunder and the militarization of their communities.

== Synopsis ==
Set in a community in the hinterlands in Mindanao, the film follows an indigenous couple whose displaced lives are compromised with their relation to the military.

Obunay and Dawin are a young indigenous Manobo couple in Mindanao who raise their three children through hunting and farming. The death of their young infant child leads to events that put their lives and their community in danger. After burying their child, Dawin learns from the village chieftain that soldiers are forcing him to accept the mining project that is destroying other communities. Dawin later encounters a squad of soldiers who pry him away from his children. Obunay is also captured later.

The couple are forced to act as guides in the soldiers' pursuit of armed rebels. They reach a Lumad school where the soldiers hostage the teachers and the community members, suspecting they are communist sympathizers. Obunay springs a plot to help the teacher and community escape. But they were caught again by the soldiers, leading to the tragic killing of Dawin.

Obunay tries to escape as soldiers were caught in a gunfire with the actual rebels. As one military squad kept chasing her, the widow leads them to the hole meant for wild boars. Obunay's act of killing is one of seeking justice.

== Cast ==
- Jong Monzon as Dawin
- Malona Sulatan as Obunay
- Luis Georlin Banaag III as Lieutenant Olivar
- Jamee Rivera as Sergeant Villamor
- Jillian Khayle Barbarona as Ilyan
- Henyo Ehem as Langit
- Mentroso Malibatu
- Nona Ruth Sarmiento
- Datu Mintroso Malibato

== Production ==
According to the filmmaker, creating the movie was not easy due to budget constraints. Notably, the main characters were played by amateurs who had their first time acting in a full-length feature. The movie was inspired by Barbarona's experience making documentary of the Manobo evacuees from Talaingod in 2014.

Barbarona said "I think the issues are somewhat universal in terms of land rights and the destruction of the Earth and our natural world. There's an influx of mining in country without really thinking what will happen tomorrow, what will happen to the indigenous people who are living on this land. Capitalism, I think, is the problem. This was one of the messages I wanted to convey. I want there to be peace talks in the Philippines."

The film's credits indicate that its storyline is based on true events that unfolded in the hinterlands of Mindanao. It shows a scene of an elderly Manobo woman named Ubunay Botod Manlaon from Sitio Bagang. She recounts her humiliating treatment by the military as she was forced to act as their guide.

== Release ==
Tu Pug Imatuy was first shown at Cinematheque Davao on March 7 and 8, 2017. Its theatrical release followed after.

It premiered in the 2017 Sinag Maynila Independent Film Festival where it won six major awards. In 2018, it was nominated for the Star Awards for Movies and Television by the Philippine Movie Press Club. It also earned a special Grand Jury Prize for Outstanding Film at the 2018 FAMAS Award.

The film was screened in the Special Features section at the 2018 Pista ng Pelikula Pilipino organized by the Film Development Council of the Philippines.

== Reception ==
Film reviews noted the movie's "raw beauty" and "painfully lyrical images" amid the beautiful visuals of forests and waterfalls that contrast sharply to the horrors of the characters that encounter torture and fear.

Film critic Skilty Labastilla wrote "The film makes up for in honesty in storytelling and in imbuing its characters with quiet dignity in the face of harrowing abuse."

In 2021, Tu Pug Imatuy was included in the Gawad Dekada Para sa Natatanging Pelikula (2010-2019) (Best Film of the Decade) by the Gawad Urian.

== Accolades ==
Accolades received by Tu Pug Imatuy
Award	Date of ceremony	Category	Recipient(s)	Result	Ref.
Asia-Pacific Film Festival	September 1, 2018	Best Director	Arnel Barbarona	Nominated	
Asia-Pacific Film Festival	September 1, 2018	Best New Actor/Actress	Malona Sulatan	Nominated	
Asia-Pacific Film Festival	September 1, 2018	Best Music	Arnel Barbarona	Nominated	
Asia-Pacific Film Festival	September 1, 2018	Best Sound	Tu Pug Imatuy	Nominated	
FACINE Filipino International Cine Festival	October 18, 2018	Audience Choice Award for Full-Length Film	Tu Pug Imatuy	Won	
FAMAS Awards	June 10, 2018	Outstanding Achievement in Directing	Arnel Barbarona	Won	
FAMAS Awards	June 10, 2018	Best Musical Score	Arnel Barbarona	Nominated	
FAMAS Awards	June 10, 2018	Best Picture	Tu Pug Imatuy	Nominated	
FAMAS Awards	June 10, 2018	Best Picture (Grand Jury Prize)	Tu Pug Imatuy	Won	
Gawad Urian Awards	June 14, 2020	Best Film	Tu Pug Imatuy	Nominated	
Gawad Urian Awards	June 14, 2020	Best Director	Arnel Barbarona	Won	
Gawad Urian Awards	June 14, 2020	Best Actress	Malona Sulatan	Nominated	
Gawad Urian Awards	June 14, 2020	Best Screenplay	Arnel Mardoquio	Nominated	
Gawad Urian Awards	June 14, 2020	Best Cinematography	Bryan Jimenez, and Arbi Barbarona	Nominated	
Gawad Urian Awards	June 14, 2020	Best Production Design	Bagwani Ampalayo	Nominated	
Gawad Urian Awards	June 14, 2020	Best Editing	Arnel Barbarona	Nominated	
Gawad Urian Awards	June 14, 2020	Best Music	Arnel Barbarona	Nominated	
Gawad Urian Awards	June 14, 2020	Best Sound	Jeff Sabayle	Nominated	
PMPC Star Awards for Movies	February 18, 2018	New Movie Actress of the Year	Malona Sulatan	Nominated	
Sinag Maynila Film Festival	March 9–14, 2017	Best Picture	Tu Pug Imatuy	Won	
Sinag Maynila Film Festival	March 9–14, 2017	Best Actress	Malona Sulatan	Won	
Sinag Maynila Film Festival	March 9–14, 2017	Best Director	Arnel Barbarona	Won	
Sinag Maynila Film Festival	March 9–14, 2017	Best Screenplay	Arnel Mardoquio	Won	
Sinag Maynila Film Festival	March 9–14, 2017	Best Cinematography	Bryan Jimenez, and Arbi Barbarona	Won	
Sinag Maynila Film Festival	March 9–14, 2017	Best Musical Score	Arnel Barbarona	Won	
