= Gandarrapiddo! The Revenger Squad =

Gandarrapiddo!: The Revenger Squad
- Theatrical release poster
- Directed by: Bb. Joyce Bernal
- Screenplay by: Danno Kristoper C. Mariquit; Daisy G. Cayanan; Jonathan James A. Albano; Jose Marie Viceral (addl. dialogue); Joyce Bernal (addl. dialogue)
- Story by: Enrico C. Santos; Juvy G. Galamiton
- Produced by: Vincent del Rosario III; Veronique del Rosario-Corpus
- Starring: Vice Ganda; Daniel Padilla; Pia Wurtzbach
- Cinematography: Mackie Galvez
- Edited by: Joyce Bernal; Noah Tonga
- Music by: Carmina R. Cuya; Emerzon Texon (addl. music)
- Production companies: ABS-CBN Film Productions; Viva Films
- Distributed by: Star Cinema
- Release date: December 25, 2017
- Running time: 111 minutes
- Country: Philippines
- Language: Filipino
- Box office: ₱571 million (January 17, 2018)

Gandarrapiddo!: The Revenger Squad is a 2017 Filipino superhero comedy film directed by Joyce Bernal and starred by Vice Ganda, Daniel Padilla, and Pia Wurtzbach. It is distributed and produced by Star Cinema and Viva Films, serving as an official entry to the 2017 Metro Manila Film Festival.

Gandarrapiddo: The Revenger Squad and Ang Panday marked the return of co-production between Star Cinema and Viva Films return to Metro Manila Film Festival since Beauty and the Bestie (2015) and it was the first and only time to have 2 co-productions between Star Cinema and Viva Films movies released at the same time during MMFF.

== Plot ==
Madman and Mino take over the lair of superheroes owned by Professor Clean but Mino is imprisoned in a mirror. Gandarra, along with Higopa, Flawlessa, Barna and Pospora fight against Madman. Their battle causes the lair to be destroyed. Madman tells Gandarra to give him the lipstick spear in exchange for Mino. But Gandarra refuses, and Madman tells her that Gandarra would never see her sister Cassandra again. Gandarra then kills Madman but is hit by a falling rock in the head. Before Professor Clean dies, he tells them to take care of Madman's son. When the superheroes try to save Gandarra, she suffers from amnesia. They take the boy named Chino and live like mortals.

Years later, Gandarra, who is called Emi along with Chino and Juvie live a decent life including fellow superheroes and neighbors Peppa (Barna), Bulldog (Pospora), Luz-Luz (Higopa) and Bokbok (Flawlessa). Peppa informed them that Chino's powers would activate on his 21st birthday. Chino is a fan of international model Cassandra Stockings, whom he encounters in a racing event. It is also revealed that Cassandra is also Kweenie, a villain who is known for spreading fake news around the internet. After Chino is fired from his job, he decides to join the Philippine Army, but Emi disagrees with him. As Chino's birthday draws near, Peppa and her group hit Gandarra in the head several times until she regains her memory.

On his 21st birthday, Chino's powers begin to appear. He gains the ability to run fast and save people from Kweenie's men. Because of his speed, he is called Rapido, infuriating Kweenie. Rapido then joins forces with Gandarra, Barna, Higopa, Flawlessa and Pospora. They identify themselves as "The Revengers Squad". Kweenie also remembers her sister Emi. But Mino tells her that she was always absent during the times she needed her. When Cassandra is invited by Chino to their house, she feels sweaty and was given a towel. Suddenly, a big mole in her left cheek appears, indicating that she is recognized by Emi. During a fight between Gandarra and Kweenie, Rapido becomes furious after learning that Gandarra killed his father Madman. He then takes the lipstick spear and leaves her.

Rapido is asked by Mino, who disguised himself as Madman, to give the lipstick spear. As the power of the lipstick spear fuses the mirror, Mino is released from the mirror. Kweenie asks the help of The Revengers Squad. They fight Mino, but Mino causes Gandarra to lose her powers. After a near death experience during which she is encouraged by Professor Clean, she comes back and defeats Mino. As they continue with their normal lives, Cassandra is visited by Marlon Stockinger, while Chino is visited by Kathryn Bernardo.

== Cast and characters ==
=== Main cast ===
- Vice Ganda as Emerson "Emy" Mariposque / Gandarra :
  A low-cost cosmetics salesperson and cleaning rag maker who lives in a decrepit house with his brother, Chino. He suffered from memory loss after being involved in a "great battle" among super beings which took place years before the main story line of the film began. Before he lost his memory, he was a superhero named Gandarra who draws power from a bertud or artifact in a form of a lipstick which he later applies on himself to transform to his alter-ego. Gandarra's signature weapon is a Lipstick Spear.

Vice Ganda himself was involved in creating the costume design for his character. He said that he and the producers first decided on the color scheme of the costume and Vice said that he wanted the costume to be vibrantly colored while also look good to appeal to children. Elements of the mobile game, EverWing - which was popular at that time, as well as Sailor Moon was also incorporated in the costume.

- Daniel Padilla as Chino Mariposque / Rappido :
  The 21-year-old brother of Emy who is characterized as "siga (lit. 'badboy') with a heart". He possesses superhuman strength and supersonic speed who adopts the alias Rappido.

Director Joyce B. Bernal said that the costume design of Padilla's character was made to reflect the "manly character" and the superhuman speed ability of his character.

- Pia Wurtzbach as Cassandra Stockings / Cassandra "Cassey" Mariposque / Kweenie :
  An orphan who became a rising fashion designer and international model who goes by the super-powered alias Kweenie. She possess combat skills, knowledge in advance technology and hypnosis ability known as "smizenopsis".

Wurtzbach's involvement in The Revenger Squad marks the first time that Wurtzbach will portray a lead role and a superhero character. Wurtzbach took refresher courses on acting before the filming of Gandarappido began. Her previous acting stint was a guest role in the television series Aryana. Director Bernal stated that the only "requirement" for the costume design of Kweenie is for it to be color gold as a nod to Wurtzbach being the titleholder of Miss Universe 2015

=== Supporting cast ===
- Ejay Falcon as Mino :
  A supervillain who is trapped within a mirror. He seeks to get Gandarra's lipstick which would free him from his imprisonment.
- Loisa Andalio as Velle :
  A close friend and neighbor of Chino Mariposque.
- Justin James Quilantang as Juvee/Enrique Heal
  The only boy in the Mariposque household who is known for being mischievous. As a provider of food, he helps Barna in her superheroine battles.
- Wacky Kiray as Bul-Dog / Pospora:
  A member of the Mariposque household who is a street cigarette vendor. As Pospora, he has the ability to control and produce fire like a match stick.
- Lassy Marquez as Bokbok / Flawlessa :
  A loyal friend of Emy Mariposque who acts as an aunt-figure to Chino. He sells floors as a living and as Flawlessa he draws powers from his pimples (or pimplets as he calls them) which he can multiply at will to use as his weapons.
- MC Calaquian as Luz-Luz / Higopa
  A soda reseller who lives with the Mariposques. As the superhero Higopa, he possess indestructible fat and has the ability the engulf and puff virtually anything.
- Karla Estrada as Peppa/Barna
  The annoying neighbor of the Mariposques who runs a food delivery business. As the superheroine, Barna, she draws power from food.
- RK Bagatsing as Renz / Madman :
  A supervillain who is the real biological father of Chino and Gandarra's greatest enemy.
- Carlo Mendoza as himself
- Michael Flores as Professor Clean
- Alvin Ronquillo
- Warren Tablo

=== Cameo role ===
- Zanjoe Marudo as Emy's love interest
- Kathryn Bernardo as Chino's love interest
- Marlon Stockinger as Cassey's love interest
- Julia Barretto as Chino's rescue
- TNT Boys
- KaladKaren Davila as a news reporter

Kris Aquino was offered to make a cameo appearance in the film to portray an antagonistic role. She declined saying that companies managing the brands she endorses may not be amicable to her playing a role of an antagonist.

== Production ==
Gandarrapiddo! was initially known to the public under at least two working titles, the first being simply known as The Revengers. In August 2017, it was announced that the name of the film was changed to Gandarah N’ Gwapito: The Revengers. Principal photography of Gandarappiddo: The Revenger Squad officially began by July 2017.

== Release ==
Gandarappiddo!: The Revenger Squad premiered in Philippine cinemas on December 25, 2017, as one of the eight official entries of the 2017 Metro Manila Film Festival.

=== Marketing ===
An official microsite for The Revenger Squad was launched on December 13, 2017. The official theme song of the film is "Gigil si Aquo", a music video featuring Vice Ganda, also released as additional marketing efforts for the film. A lyric video was later released which featured the characters of Vice Ganda, Daniel Padilla, and Pia Wurtzbach and included "never-before-seen moments on set". According to critics, the song resembles Blackpink's "Boombayah".

== Reception ==
The Revenger Squad's total box office gross during the official run of the 2017 Metro Manila Film Festival is ₱540 million, making it the top-grossing film among the festival entries. By January 17, 2018, the overall domestic box office gross of the film which screened beyond the official run of the film festival amounted to ₱571 million.

=== Accolades ===
Year	Award-Giving Body	Category	Recipient	Result
2017	Metro Manila Film Festival	People's Choice Award	Gandarrapiddo: The Revenger Squad	Won

== Future ==
In January 2018, Vice Ganda and Pia Wurtzbach two of the stars of The Revengers Squad, hinted that the film might have a sequel remarking that there is still yet to be explored regarding the characters of film.
