= Dear Other Self =

Filipino romantic comedy film

- Theatrical release poster
- Directed by: Veronica Velasco
- Screenplay by: Veronica Velasco; Jinky Laurel
- Story by: Veronica Velasco
- Produced by: Charo Santos-Concio; Malou N. Santos
- Starring: Jodi Sta. Maria; Xian Lim; Joseph Marco
- Cinematography: Kerwin Go
- Edited by: Henry Ramirez
- Music by: Cesar Francis Concio
- Production company: Star Cinema
- Distributed by: ABS-CBN Film Productions
- Release date: May 17, 2017
- Running time: 110 minutes
- Country: Philippines
- Languages: Filipino; English

Dear Other Self is a 2017 Filipino romantic comedy film written and directed by Veronica Velasco starring Jodi Sta. Maria, Xian Lim and Joseph Marco. The film was released in the Philippines on May 17, 2017, and May 26, 2017, in the United States.

== Synopsis ==
Becky, a family breadwinner finds herself in a delimmna and ponders two possible future where she visualizes herself between taking a promotion at her current job or pursuing her love for traveling.

== Cast ==
Main Cast

- Jodi Santamaria as Rebecca "Becky" Macadaeg
- Xian Lim as Henry
- Joseph Marco as Chris

Supporting Cast

- Carla Martinez as Minda Macadaeg
- Bodjie Pascua as Roger Macadaeg
- Anna Luna as Monica
- Paul Salas as Pepe Macadaeg

Guest Cast

- Elaine Ochoa as Sophia
- Sunshine Teodoro as Grace Pascual
