= 36th Luna Awards =

2017 Filipino film awards

- Date: September 29, 2018
- Site: Resorts World Manila

Highlights
- Best Picture: Ang Larawan
- Most awards: Ang Larawan (7)
- Most nominations: Changing Partners (10)

The 36th Luna Awards ceremony, presented by the Film Academy of the Philippines (FAP), honored the best Filipino films of 2017. It took place on September 29, 2018 at the Resorts World Manila in Pasay, Philippines.

== Winners and nominees ==
=== Awards ===
Winners are listed first, highlighted in boldface.

Best Picture	Best Direction
**Ang Larawan**; Changing Partners; Chanters; Historiographika Errata; Kita Kita; Love You to the Stars and Back; Neomanila; Respeto; Seven Sundays; Siargao	**Loy Arcenas – Ang Larawan**; Alberto Monteras II – Respeto; Antoinette Jadaone – Love You to the Stars and Back; Cathy Garcia-Molina – Seven Sundays; Dan Villegas – Changing Partners; James Robin Mayo – Chanters; Mikhail Red – Neomanila; Paul Soriano– Siargao; Richard V. Somes – Historiographika Errata; Sigrid Andrea Bernardo – Kita Kita
Best Actor	Best Actress
**Aga Muhlach – Seven Sundays**; Allen Dizon – Bomba; Empoy Marquez – Kita Kita; Jericho Rosales – Siargao; Joshua Garcia – Love You to the Stars and Back; Justine Samson – Balangiga: Howling Wilderness; Noel Trinidad – Paki; Nonie Buencamino – Smaller and Smaller Circles; Sandino Martin – Changing Partners	**Joanna Ampil – Ang Larawan**; Agot Isidro – Changing Partners; Alessandra de Rossi – Kita Kita; Dexter Doria – Paki; Erich Gonzales – Siargao; Eula Valdez – Neomanila; Jally Nae Gilbaliga – Chanters; Julia Barretto – Love You to the Stars and Back
Best Supporting Actor	Best Supporting Actress
**John Arcilla – Birdshot**; Alex Medina – Historiographika Errata; Ku Aquino – Birdshot; Nonie Buencamino – Ang Larawan; Rocky Salumbides – Neomanila; Romulo Caballero – Chanters; Ronwaldo Martin – Bhoy Instik; Sid Lucero – Smaller and Smaller Circles	**Jasmine Curtis-Smith – Siargao**; Anna Luna – Changing Partners; Cristine Reyes – Seven Sundays; Kate Bikos – Bomba; Yayo Aguila – Kiko Boksingero
Best Screenplay	Best Cinematography
**Seven Sundays – Roumelia Narciso and Kiko Abrillo**; Ang Larawan – Waya Gallardo; Changing Partners – Lilit Reyes and Vincent Reyes; Chanters – Andrain Legaspi and John Bedia; Historiographika Errata – Jimmy Flores; Kita Kita – Sigrid Andrea Bernardo; Neomanila – Mikhael Red, Zig Dulay and Rae Red; Respeto – Njel De Mesa and Albert Monteras II	**Ang Larawan – Boy Yniguez**; Balangiga: Howling Wilderness – Albert Banzon; Bhoy Intsik – Rain Yamson II; Birdshot – Mycko David; Bomba – Pipo Domagas; Historiographika Errata – Alex Espartero; Kita Kita – Boy Yniguez; Neomanila – Mycko David; Seven Sundays – Theo Lozada
Best Production Design	Best Editing
**Ang Larawan – Gino Gonzales**; Bhoy Intsik – Edgar Littaua; Changing Partners – Shari Mari Montague; Historiographika Errata – Donald Russ Camon and Julius Erving Somes; Kita Kita – Thesa Tang; Love You to the Stars and Back – Ana Lou Sanchez; Neomanila – Daniel Red; Respeto – Popo Diaz; Seven Sundays – Norico Santos; Siargao – Benjamin Padero and Carlo Tabije	**Seven Sundays – Marya Ignacio**; Ang Larawan – Lawrence Fajardo; Birdshot – Jay Halili and Mikhail Red; Bhoy Intsik – John Anthony L. Wong; Changing Partners – Marya Ignacio; Chanters – Ron Acal; Kita Kita – Marya Ignacio Joyce Bernal; Neomanila – Jeffrey Loreno and Mikhail Red; Smaller And Smaller Circles – Jay Halil
Best Musical Score	Best Sound
**Ang Larawan – Ryan Cayabyab**; Balangiga: Howling Wilderness – Khavn; Changing Partners – Vincent De Jesus; Historiographika Errata – Francis De Veyra; Kiko Boksingero – Pepe Manikan; Kita Kita – Len Calvo; Love You to the Stars and Back – Cesar Francis Concio; Seven Sundays – Jesse Lasaten	**Ang Larawan – Hit Productions**; Bhoy Intsik – John Wong and Apol Cebreiros; Changing Partners – Jason Conanan, Katherine Salinas, and Myco Quizon; Historiographika Errata – Junel R. Valencia; Kita Kita – Lamberto Casa and Immanuel T. Verona; Love You to the Stars and Back – Allen Roy Santos; Neomanila – Bryan Dumaguina; Seven Sundays – Allen Roy Santos; Siargao – Myko Quizon/ Kat Salinas and Jason Conanan; Smaller and Smaller Circles – Corinne De San Jose

=== Special awards ===
The following honorary awards were also awarded.

- FPJ Lifetime Achievement Awardee – Charo Santos
- Lamberto Avellana Memorial Awardee – Maryo J. Delos Reyes and Augusto Buenaventura
- Manuel de Leon for Exemplary Achievement Award – Rosa Rosal
