= 41st Gawad Urian Awards =

2018 Philippine film awards ceremony

- Date: June 14, 2018
- Site: ABS-CBN Vertis Tent, Bagong Pag-asa, Quezon City
- Hosted by: Alessandra de Rossi; Butch Francisco; Empoy Marquez

Highlights
- Best Film: Balangiga: Howling Wilderness
- Most awards: Respeto (4)
- Most nominations: Respeto (12)

Television coverage
- Network: Cinema One

The 41st Gawad Urian Awards or Ika-41 na Gawad Urian was held on June 14, 2018, at ABS-CBN Vertis Tent. They honored the best Filipino films for the year 2017. It aired live at Cinema One channel.

Nominations were announced on May 22. Respeto received the most nominations with twelve.

Balangiga: Howling Wilderness won the Best Film while Respeto won the most awards with four. The Natatanging Gawad Urian was awarded to jazz pianist and musical scorer Winston Raval.

== Winners and nominees ==
Best Film Pinakamahusay na Pelikula	Best Direction Pinakamahusay na Direksyon
Balangiga: Howling Wilderness; Birdshot; Bhoy Intsik; The Chanters; Respeto; Tu Pug Imatuy	Arnel Barbarona – Tu Pug Imatuy; Sigrid Andrea Bernardo – Kita Kita; Khavn de la Cruz – Balangiga: Howling Wilderness; Joel Lamangan – Bhoy Intsik; James Robin Mayo – The Chanters; Treb Monteras II – Respeto; Mikhail Red – Birdshot
Best Actor Pinakamahusay na Pangunahing Aktor	Best Actress Pinakamahusay na Pangunahing Aktres
Abra – Respeto; Nonie Buencamino – Smaller and Smaller Circles; Timothy Castillo – Neomanila; Noel Comia Jr. – Kiko Boksingero; Allen Dizon – Bomba; RS Francisco – Bhoy Intsik; Jojit Lorenzo – Changing Partners; Empoy Marquez – Kita Kita; Sandino Martin – Changing Partners; Justine Samson – Balangiga: Howling Wilderness	Joanna Ampil – Ang Larawan; Angeli Bayani – Bagahe; Alessandra de Rossi – Kita Kita; Gloria Diaz – Si Chedeng at Si Apple; Dexter Doria – Paki; Jally Nae Gilbaliga – The Chanters; Agot Isidro – Changing Partners; Elizabeth Oropesa – Si Chedeng at Si Apple; Bela Padilla – 100 Tula Para Kay Stella; Angeli Nicole Sanoy – Bomba; Malona Sulatan – Tu Pug Imatuy
Best Supporting Actor Pinakamahusay na Pangalawang Aktor	Best Supporting Actress Pinakamahusay na Pangalawang Aktres
Dido de la Paz – Respeto; John Arcilla – Birdshot; Robert Arevalo – Ang Larawan; Romulo Caballero – The Chanters; Pio del Rio – Balangiga: Howling Wilderness; Nor Domingo – Respeto; Ronwaldo Martin – Bhoy Intsik; Jess Mendoza – Sa Gabing Nanahimik ang mga Kuliglig; Arnold Reyes – Birdshot	Odette Khan – Bar Boys; Yayo Aguila – Kiko Boksingero; Angeli Bayani – Maestra; Shamaine Buencamino – Paki; Jasmine Curtis-Smith – Siargao; Chai Fonacier – Respeto; Nathalie Hart – Historiographika Errata; Menchu Lauchengco-Yulo – Ang Larawan; Gloria Sevilla – Maestra
Best Screenplay Pinakamahusay na Dulang Pampelikula	Best Cinematography Pinakamahusay na Sinematograpiya
Christopher Gozum – Dapol Tan Payawar na Tayug 1931; Sigrid Andrea Bernardo – Kita Kita; Ronald Carballo – Bhoy Intsik; Njel de Mesa & Treb Monteras II – Respeto; Jerry Gracio & Khavn de la Cruz – Balangiga: Howling Wilderness; Andrian Legaspi & John Bedia – The Chanters; Arnel Mardoquio – Tu Pug Imatuy; Kip Oebanda – Bar Boys	Mycko David – Neomanila; Ike Avellana – Respeto; Albert Banzon – Balangiga: Howling Wilderness; Mycko David – Birdshot; Bryan Jimenez & Arbi Barbarona – Tu Pug Imatuy; TM Malones – Baconaua; JA Tadena – Smaller and Smaller Circles
Best Production Design Pinakamahusay na Disenyong Pamproduksyon	Best Editing Pinakamahusay na Editing
Gino Gonzales – Ang Larawan; Bagwani Ampalayo – Tu Pug Imatuy; Popo Diaz – Respeto; Marielle Hizon – Baconaua; Ericson Navarro – Smaller and Smaller Circles; Daniel Red – Neomanila; Thesa Tang – Kita Kita; Marija Vicente, Timmy Harn & Zeus Bascon – Balangiga: Howling Wilderness	Lawrence Ang – Respeto; Arnel Barbarona – Tu Pug Imatuy; Lawrence Fajardo – Ang Larawan; Jay Halili – Smaller and Smaller Circles; Marya Ignacio – Kita Kita; Marya Ignacio – Changing Partners; Carlo Francisco Manatad – Balangiga: Howling Wilderness; John Anthony Wong – Bhoy Intsik
Best Music Pinakamahusay na Musika	Best Sound Pinakamahusay na Tunog
Khavn de la Cruz – Balangiga: Howling Wilderness; Arnel Barbarona – Tu Pug Imatuy; Ryan Cayabyab – Ang Larawan; Vincent de Jesus – Changing Partners; Jay Durias – Respeto; Erwin Fajardo – The Chanters; Lutgardo Labad & Odoni Pestelos – Smaller and Smaller Circles	Corrine de San Jose – Respeto; KC Caballero – Ang Larawan; Aian Caro – Birdshot; Stephen Lopez – Balangiga: Howling Wilderness; Mikko Quizon – Changing Partners; Jeff Sabayle – Tu Pug Imatuy; Immanuel Verona – The Chanters
Best Short Film Pinakamahusay na Maikling Pelikula	Best Documentary Pinakamahusay na Dokyumentaryo
Kiri Dalena – Gikan sa Ngitngit nga Kinailadman; Glenn Barit – Aliens Ata; Christian Candelaria – Sa Saiyang Isla; Carl Adrian Chavez – Sorry for the Inconvenience; Keith Deligero – Babylon; Kyle Fermindoza – Manggagarab; Dennis Hubag – Empyreus; TM Malones – Bawod; Carlo Francisco Manatad – Jodilerks Dela Cruz, Employee of the Month; Roanna Mercado – Piko; Maje Papin & Ef Orpiada Jr.– Lutab; Xeph Suarez – Si Astri Maka Si Tambulah; Edmund Telmo – Redempsyon; Kim Timan – Caramel Child	Victor Delotavo Tagaro & Toshihiko Uriu – Yield; Jose Buenconsejo – Seven Dances of Life; JL Burgos – Han-ayan; Sari Dalena & Keith Sicat – History of the Underground; Ramona Diaz – Motherland; Phyllis Grande – Haunted: A Last Visit to the Red House; Nawruz Paguidopon – God BLISS Our Home; Dempster Samarista – Bundok Banahaw, Sacred and Profane

== Multiple nominations and awards ==
Nominations	Film
12	Respeto
10	Balangiga: Howling Wilderness
9	Tu Pug Imatuy
7	The Chanters
7	Ang Larawan
6	Birdshot
6	Bhoy Intsik
6	Changing Partners
6	Kita Kita
5	Smaller and Smaller Circles
3	Neomanila
2	Baconaua
2	Bar Boys
2	Bomba
2	Si Chedeng at Si Apple
2	Kiko Boksingero
2	Maestra
2	Paki

Awards	Film
4	Respeto
2	Balangiga: Howling Wilderness
2	Ang Larawan
