= The EDDYS =

Annual media awards in the Philippines

- Current: The EDDYS 2026
- Awarded for: Excellence in cinematic achievements
- Country: Philippines
- Presented by: Society of Philippine Entertainment Editors
- Hosted by: Pops Fernandez and Kim Atienza
- First award: July 8, 2017; 9 years ago

Television/radio coverage
- Directed by: Calvin Neria

The EDDYS or The Entertainment Editors' Choice is an annual film event in the Philippines that honors craftsmen, actors, writers, directors, workers, and producers in the Philippine film industry.

The awards are given by the Society of Philippine Entertainment Editors (SPEEd), whose members are the entertainment editors of national broadsheets, top tabloids, and online news sites in the Philippines. The group was established in 2015.

== History ==
The inaugural The EDDYS was staged on July 8, 2017 at the Kia Theatre (now New Frontier Theatre) and was telecast on ABS-CBN. It was hosted by father and son Edu Manzano and Luis Manzano.

In 2018, The EDDYS collaborated with Globe Studios as major presenter while the awards night was produced by FM station, Wish 107.5. For the first time, The EDDYS staged a Nominees Night on June 3, 2018 at Valencia Events Place in Quezon City. It was co-sponsored by the Film Development Council of the Philippines (FDCP), headed by Chairman Liza Diño.

The 2nd EDDYS was held at Theatre at Solaire in Parañaque City on July 9, 2018. The show was directed by Paolo Valenciano and was hosted by siblings Ruffa Gutierrez and Raymond Gutierrez.

The third edition of the annual awards was held on July 14, 2019 at the New Frontier Theatre in Cubao Quezon City. The awarding ceremonies was telecast on Colours Channel. It was hosted by broadcast journalist and Rated K host Korina Sanchez with Lourd de Veyra as segment host.

In its 4th edition, EDDYS was supposed to introduce four additional categories to include local films that first premiered on streaming services like Netflix, iflix, iWant, and HOOQ. Due to COVID-19 pandemic, the awards night, which was slated on July 5 and to be hosted by Boy Abunda, was cancelled.

== Organization ==
SPEEd (Society of the Philippine Entertainment Editors), the organization behind the annual The EDDYS, is made up of entertainment editors of newspapers and tabloid circulated daily nationwide. The non-profit organization was established in 2015 initially as a social club.

The organization was initially formed as a social group led by its founding president, Manila Standard's former entertainment editor, the late Isah V. Red. He was succeeded by Manila Bulletin's Jojo Panaligan (2018) and then by People's Tonight's Ian Fariñas (2019).

=== Current Officers ===
- President - Tessa Mauricio-Arriola (The Manila Times)
- Vice President Internal - Maricris Nicasio - Hataw
- Vice President External - Gie Trillana - Malaya Business Insights
- Secretary - Ervin Santiago - Bandera and Rohn Romulo - People's Balita
- Treasurer - Dondon Sermino (Abante)
- Assistant Treasurer - Dinah Ventura (Daily Tribune)
- Auditor - Rohn Romulo (People's Balita)
- P.R.O. - Nickie Wang (Manila Standard) and Janiz Navida - Bulgar

=== Members ===
- Tessa Mauricio-Arriola - The Manila Times
- Ervin Santiago - Bandera
- Rohn Romulo - People's Balita
- Salve Asis - Pilipino Star Ngayon, Pang Masa
- Neil Ramos - Tempo and Manila Bulletin
- Nestor Cuartero - Tempo
- Nickie Wang - Manila Standard
- Maricris Nicasio - Hataw
- Dondon Sermino - Abante
- Dinah Ventura - Daily Tribune
- Gie Trillana - Malaya Business Insights
- Nathalie Tomada - The Philippine Star
- Ian Fariñas - People's Tonight
- Eugene Asis - People's Journal
- Janiz Navida - Bulgar
- Anna Pingol - Pika Pika
- Jun Lalin - Abante
- Roldan Castro - Abante

=== Honorary Member ===
- Rito Asilo - Philippine Daily Inquirer

== Events ==
The Nominees Night, which is one of the most anticipated run-ups to the main event celebrates the creatives, talented artists, and film workers who are nominated in The EDDYS. The first and second edition was in partnership with the Film Development Council of the Philippines (FDCP).

Prior to the awarding ceremony for the 2nd EDDYS, cinematography, acting, scriptwriting, and sound design workshops were held in partnership with FDCP. Two best film nominees (TBA's Birdshot and T-Rex Entertainment's Deadma Walking) were also screened at FDCP's Cinematheque Center Manila. The free film showing was in line with Globe Studio's #playitright anti-piracy campaign.

== Award ceremonies ==
Year	Ceremony	Awards Night Venue	Host/s	Director	Telecast
2017	1st Eddys	Kia Theater	Edu Manzano and Luis Manzano		ABS-CBN
2018	2nd Eddys	The Theatre at Solaire Resort & Casino	Ruffa Gutierrez and Raymond Gutierrez	Paolo Valenciano	
2019	3rd Eddys	New Frontier Theater	Korina Sanchez-Roxas	Calvin Neria	Colours Channel
2021	4th Eddys	virtual event due to Covid-19 restrictions	Robi Domingo	Ice Seguerra	no telecast since held virtually
2022	5th Eddys	Manila Metropolitan Theater	Boy Abunda	Ice Seguerra	
2023	6th Eddys	Aliw Theater	Piolo Pascual and Iza Calzado	Eric Quizon	A2Z
2024	7th Eddys	Marriott Grand Ballroom Newport World Resorts	Janine Gutierrez, Gabbi Garcia and Jake Ejercito	Eric Quizon	All TV
2025	8th Eddys	Marriott Grand Ballroom Newport World Resorts	Darren Espanto, Kyline Alcantara, Kaila Estrada and Alexa Ilacad	Eric Quizon	iWant Jeepney TV
2026	9th Eddys	Marriott Grand Ballroom Newport World Resorts	Pops Fernandez and Kim Atienza	Calvin Neria	The Eddys Facebook Page

== Categories ==
The awards are presented in the following 14 categories:

1. Best Picture
2. Best Director
3. Best Actor
4. Best Actress
5. Best Supporting Actor
6. Best Supporting Actress
7. Best Screenplay
8. Best Cinematography
9. Best Visual Effects
10. Best Musical Score
11. Best Production Design
12. Best Sound
13. Best Editing
14. Best Original Theme Song

=== Special awards ===
1. Joe Quirino Award
2. Manny Pichel Award
3. Producer of the Year
4. Rising Producer Circle Award
5. ICONS AWARD — (7 artists)
6. Posthumous Honorees

== Winners ==
=== 2017 ===
1. Best Picture - Ang Babaeng Humayo
2. Best Director - Lav Diaz (Ang Babaeng Humayo)
3. Best Actor - Paolo Ballesteros (Die Beautiful)
4. Best Actress - Vilma Santos (Everything About Her)
5. Best Supporting Actor - John Lloyd Cruz (Ang Babaeng Humayo)
6. Best Supporting Actress - Angel Locsin (Everything About Her)
7. Best Screenplay - Everything About Her
8. Best Cinematography - Seklusyon
9. Best Visual Effects - Seklusyon
10. Best Musical Score - Everything About Her
11. Best Production Design - Die Beautiful
12. Best Sound - Seklusyon
13. Best Editing - Die Beautiful
14. Best Original Theme Song - Saving Sally

==== Special awards ====
1. Joe Quirino Award - Boy Abunda
2. Manny Pichel Award - Lav Diaz
3. Producer of the Year: Mother Lily Monteverde of Regal Films

=== 2018 ===
1. Best Picture - Respeto
2. Best Director - Mikhail Red (Birdshot)
3. Best Actor - Aga Muhlach (Seven Sundays)
4. Best Actress - Mary Joy Apostol (Birdshot)
5. Best Supporting Actor - Dido dela Paz (Respeto)
6. Best Supporting Actress - Angeli Bayani (Maestra), Therese Malvar (Ilawod) and Chai Fonacier (Respeto)
7. Best Screenplay - Eric Cabahug (Deadma Walking)
8. Best Cinematography - Mycko David (Birdshot(
9. Best Visual Effects - Ang Panday
10. Best Musical Score - Jay Durias (Respeto)
11. Best Production Design - Gino Gonzales (Ang Larawan)
12. Best Sound - Corrine De San Jose (Respeto)
13. Best Editing - Marya Ignacio (Kita Kita)
14. Best Original Theme Song - "Respeto" by Abra (rapper) and Loonie (Respeto)

==== Special awards ====
1. Joe Quirino Award - Mario Hernando
2. Manny Pichel Award - Ricky Lo
3. Producer of the Year - Viva Films
4. Rising Producer Circle Award - Regal Films
5. Icons Award - Charo Santos-Concio, Eddie Garcia, Susan Roces, Gloria Romero, Nora Aunor and Maricel Soriano
6. Posthumous Honorees - Mario Hernando, Maryo J. delos Reyes, Soxie Topacio, Maning Borlaza, Bernardo Bernardo, Argel Joseph and Isabel Granada

=== 2019 ===
1. Best Picture - Liway
2. Best Director - Joel Lamangan (Rainbow's Sunset)
3. Best Actor - Dingdong Dantes (Sid & Aya)
4. Best Actress - Kathryn Bernardo (The Hows of Us)
5. Best Supporting Actor - Arjo Atayde (BuyBust)
6. Best Supporting Actress - Max Collins (Citizen Jake)
7. Best Screenplay - Zig Dulay (Liway)
8. Best Cinematography - Yam Laranas (Aurora)
9. Best Visual Effects - Aurora
10. Best Musical Score - Paulo Protacio (Bakwit Boys)
11. Best Production Design - Roy Lachica (Goyo: Ang Batang Heneral)
12. Best Sound - Bakwit Boys
13. Best Editing - Chuck Gutierrez (Liway)
14. Best Original Theme Song - Maybe The Night by Ben&Ben (Exes Baggage)

==== Special awards ====
1. Joe Quirino Award - Cristy Fermin
2. Manny Pichel Award - Ethel Ramos
3. Producer of the Year Star Cinema
4. Rising Producers’ Circle Award - Spring Films and T-Rex Entertainment
5. Lifetime Achievement Award - Elwood Perez
6. Posthumous Honoree - Dolphy

=== 2020 ===
The 2020 Entertainment Editors’ Choice (Eddys) was cancelled due to Covid-19 pandemic.The Society of Philippine Entertainment Editors (SPEEd), the group which hands out the movie awards, released a statement in April announcing their decision to forgo The Eddys 2020.

=== 2021 ===
The Society of Philippine Entertainment Editors, in partnership with the Film Development Council of the Philippines, held the first virtual edition of The EDDYS on April 4, 2021. The awards night, which streamed live on various platforms (Facebook via Manila Standard, The Daily Tribune, and SPEEd pages; FDCPchannel.ph; and on Nickie Wang's YouTube channel VERY WANG) was hosted by Robi Domingo and directed by Ice Seguerra. Among the presenters were FDCP's Liza Dino, actor Dingdong Dantes, and Star for All Seasons Vilma Santos-Recto.

Here are the winners:

1. Best Picture - Fan Girl
2. Best Director - Antoinette Jadaone (Fan Girl)
3. Best Actor - Paulo Avelino (Fan Girl)
4. Best Actress - Charlie Dizon (Fan Girl)
5. Best Supporting Actor - Edgar Allan Guzman (Coming Home)
6. Best Supporting Actress - Shaina Magdayao (Tagpuan)
7. Best Screenplay - Antoinette Jadaone (Fan Girl)
8. Best Cinematography - Rody Lacap (Magikland)
9. Best Visual Effects - Magikland
10. Best Musical Score - On Vodka, Beer and Regrets and The Boy Foretold by the Stars
11. Best Production Design - Ericson Navarro (Magikland)
12. Best Sound - Vincent Villa (Fan Girl)
13. Best Editing - Benjamin Tolentino (Fan Girl)
14. Best Original Theme Song - "Ulan" (The Boy Foretold by the Stars)

==== Special awards ====
1. Joe Quirino Award - Lolit Solis
2. Manny Pichel Award - Mario Bautista
3. Isah V. Red Award - Angel Locsin, Bong Revilla, Kim Chiu, Beautderm's Rhea Anicoche-Tan, Unilab's Claire de Leon-Papa, and Ramon Ang
4. Rising Producer Circle Award - Black Sheep Productions
5. Producer of the Year - The IdeaFirst Company
6. Icons Award - Gloria Sevilla, Ronaldo Valdez, Pilar Pilapil, Boots Anson-Rodrigo, Gina Pareño, Dante Rivero, Tommy Abuel, Caridad Sanchez, Joel Lamangan and Ricky Lee
7. Posthumous Award - Peque Gallaga, Tony Mabesa, Menggie Cobarrubias, Ramon Revilla, Sr. and Tony Ferrer

=== 2022 ===
1. Best Picture - On the Job: The Missing 8
2. Best Director - Erik Matti (On the Job: The Missing 8)
3. Best Actor - Christian Bables (Big Night!)
4. Best Actress - Charo Santos (Kun Maupay Man It Panahon)
5. Best Supporting Actor - Mon Confiado (Arisaka)
6. Best Supporting Actress - Lotlot de Leon (On the Job: The Missing 8)
7. Best Screenplay - Jun Robles Lana (Big Night!)
8. Best Cinematography - Neil Derrick Bion (On the Job: The Missing 8)
9. Best Visual Effects - On the Job: The Missing 8
10. Best Musical Score - Erwin Romulo (On the Job: The Missing 8), Cesar Francis Concio (Love Is Color Blind) and Teresa Borrozo (Big Night!)
11. Best Production Design - Whammy Alcazaren (Kun Maupay Man It Panahon)
12. Best Sound - Corinne de San Jose (On the Job: The Missing 8)
13. Best Editing - Jay Halili (On the Job: The Missing 8)
14. Best Original Theme Song - "Maghihintay" (More Than Blue)

==== Special awards ====
1. Joe Quirino Award - Mario Dumaual
2. Manny Pichel Award - Eric Ramos
3. Producer of the Year - Viva Films
4. Rising Producer Circle Award - Rein Entertainment
5. Isah V. Red Awardees - Alfred Vargas, Gretchen Barretto, Kris Aquino, GMA Kapuso Foundation and ABS-CBN Sagip Kapamilya
6. Icon Award - Helen Gamboa, Divina Valencia, Elizabeth Oropesa, Sharon Cuneta, Alma Moreno, Tito Sotto, Vic Sotto, Joey de Leon, Phillip Salvador and Roi Vinzon

=== 2023 ===
1. Best Picture - Blue Room and Family Matters
2. Best Director - Nuel Crisostomo Naval (Family Matters)
3. Best Actor - Elijah Canlas (Blue Room)
4. Best Actress - Max Eigenmann (12 Weeks) and Janine Gutierrez (Bakit 'Di Mo Sabihin?)
5. Best Supporting Actor - Mon Confiado (Nanahimik ang Gabi)
6. Best Supporting Actress - Nikki Valdez (Family Matters)
7. Best Screenplay - Mel Mendoza-Del Rosario (Family Matters)
8. Best Cinematography - Moises Zee (Nanahimik ang Gabi)
9. Best Visual Effects - Carl Regis Abuel, Tricia Bernasor, Geraldine Co (LiveScream)
10. Best Musical Score - Jazz Nicolas and Mikey Amistoso (Blue Room)
11. Best Production Design - Marxie Maolen Fadul (Blue Room)
12. Best Sound - Emilio Bien Sparks (Nanahimik ang Gabi)
13. Best Editing - Vanessa de Leon (Blue Room)
14. Best Original Theme Song - "Sa Hawak Mo" by Paulo Zarate and Floyd Tena (Family Matters)

==== Special awards ====
1. Joe Quirino Award - Aster Amoyo
2. Manny Pichel Award - Ed de Leon
3. Producer of the Year - Viva Films
4. Rising Producer Circle Award - MavX Productions
5. Isah V. Red Awardees - Coco Martin, Herbert Bautista and Piolo Pascual
6. Icon Award - Niño Muhlach, Aga Muhlach and Snooky Serna

=== 2024 ===
1. Best Picture - About Us But Not About Us
2. Best Director - Jun Robles Lana (About Us But Not About Us)
3. Best Actor - Piolo Pascual (Mallari)
4. Best Actress - Julia Montes (Five Breakups and a Romance) and Charlie Dizon (Third World Romance)
5. Best Supporting Actor - Enchong Dee (GomBurZa)
6. Best Supporting Actress - Gladys Reyes (Apag)
7. Best Screenplay - Jun Robles Lana (About Us But Not About Us)
8. Best Cinematography - Juan Lorenzo Orendain (Mallari)
9. Best Visual Effects - Shake, Rattle & Roll Extreme
10. Best Musical Score - Von De Guzman (Mallari)
11. Best Production Design - Mariel Hizon (Mallari)
12. Best Sound - Immanuel Verona and Nerrika Salim (Mallari)
13. Best Editing - Lawrence Ang (About Us But Not About Us)
14. Best Original Theme Song - "Sa Duyan ng Bayan" (GomBurZa)

==== Special awards ====
1. Box Office Heroes Award - Dingdong Dantes, Marian Rivera, Kathryn Bernardo, Piolo Pascual, Alden Richards and Julia Montes
2. Icons Award — Eva Darren, Nova Villa, Leo Martinez, Lito Lapid and Gina Alajar
3. Posthumous Award- Carlo J. Caparas

=== 2025 ===
1. Best Picture - Green Bones
2. Best Director - Zig Dulay - (Green Bones)
3. Best Actor - Dennis Trillo - (Green Bones)
4. Best Actress - Marian Rivera - (Balota)
5. Best Supporting Actor - Ruru Madrid in (Green Bones) and Aga Muhlach in (Uninvited
6. Best Supporting Actress - Lorna Tolentino - (Espantaho)
7. Best Screenplay - Vicente Groyon - (Under the Piaya Moon)
8. Best Cinematography - (Green Bones)
9. Best Visual Effects - (Espantaho)
10. Best Musical Score - Vincent de Jesus - (Isang Himala)
11. Best Production Design - (The Kingdom)
12. Best Sound - (Topakk)
13. Best Editing - (My Future You)
14. Best Original Theme Song - (My Future You)

==== Special awards ====
1. Box Office Heroes - Alden Richards, Kathryn Bernardo, Joshua Garcia, Julia Barretto and Vice Ganda
2. Movie Icons - Laurice Guillen, Odette Khan, Perla Bautista, Pen Medina, Rosemarie Gil, Eddie Mesa and Kidlat Tahimik
3. Producer of the Year - GMA Pictures
4. Rising Producer Circle Award - Nathan Studios
5. Joe Quirino Memorial Award - Ogie Diaz
6. Manny Pichel Memorial Award - Crispina Belen
7. Isah V Red Award - RS Francisco

== Philanthropy ==
Apart from the annual awards show, the group behind The EDDYS also organizes events to give back to the community. SPEEd marked the founding of the organization with an outreach activity at the Anawim Home for the Abandoned and Rejected Elderlies in Barangay San Isidro in Rodriguez, Rizal. In its effort to advance entertainment journalism in the Philippines, SPEEd currently supports a Communication Arts student as the group's first scholar.
