= 2017 Cinemalaya =

13th Cinemalaya Independent Film Festival
- Festival official poster
- Opening film: Birdshot by Mikhail Red
- Closing film: Pastor by Adolfo Alix, Jr.
- Location: Metro Manila, Philippines
- Film titles: 21
- Festival date: August 4, 2017–August 13, 2017
- Website: Official Website

Cinemalaya chronology
- 2018 2016

The 13th Cinemalaya Independent Film Festival was held from August 4–13, 2017 in Metro Manila, Philippines. A total of nine full-length features and twelve short films competed. The festival was opened by Mikhail Red's Birdshot and was closed by Adolfo Alix, Jr.'s Pastor.

== Entries ==
The winning film is highlighted with boldface and a dagger.

=== Full-Length Features ===
Title	Director	Cast	Genre
Baconaua	Joseph Israel Laban	Elora Españo, Therese Malvar, JM Salvado and Bembol Roco	Coming-of-age drama
Bagahe	Zig Dulay	Angeli Bayani	Social drama
Ang Guro Kong 'Di Marunong Magbasa	Perry Escaño	Alfred Vargas, Mon Confiado, James Blanco, Miggs Cuaderno, Micko Laurente and Marc Justine Alvarez	Action, Drama
Kiko Boksingero	Thop Nazareno	Noel Comia, Jr., Yayo Aguila and Yul Servo	Family drama
Nabubulok	Sonny Calvento	Gina Alajar, JC Santos, Billy Ray Gallion and Jameson Blake	Crime, Drama
Ang Pamilyang Hindi Lumuluha	Mes de Guzman	Sharon Cuneta	Black comedy
Requited	Nerissa Picadizo	Jake Cuenca and Anna Luna	Drama
**Respeto** ^{†}	Treb Monteras II	Abra, Dido de la Paz and Loonie	Drama, Music
Sa Gabing Nanahimik ang mga Kuliglig	Iar Arondaing	Angel Aquino and Jake Macapagal	Social drama

=== Short films ===
Title	Director
Aliens Ata	Glenn Barit
Bawod	T.M. Malones
Fatima Marie Torres and the Invasion of Space Shuttle Pinas 25	Carlo Francisco Manatad
**Hilom** ^{†}	P.R. Patindol
Islabodan	Juan Carlo Tarobal
Juana and the Sacred Shores	Antonne Santiago
Lola Loleng	Che Tagyamon
Manong ng Pa-aling	E. del Mundo
Maria	Jaime Habac, Jr.
Nakauwi Na	Marvin Cabangunay; Jaynus Olaivar
Nakaw	Arvin Belarmino; Noel Escondo
Sorry for the Inconvenience	Carl Adrian Chavez

== Awards ==
The awards ceremony was held on August 13, 2017 at the Tanghalang Nicanor Abelardo, Cultural Center of the Philippines.

=== Full-Length Features ===
- Best Film – Respeto by Treb Monteras II
  - Special Jury Prize – Baconaua by Joseph Israel Laban
  - Audience Choice Award – Respeto by Treb Monteras II
- Best Direction – Joseph Israel Laban for Baconaua
- Best Actor – Noel Comia Jr. for Kiko Boksingero
- Best Actress – Angeli Bayani for Bagahe
- Best Supporting Actor – Dido de la Paz for Respeto
- Best Supporting Actress – Yayo Aguila for Kiko Boksingero
- Best Screenplay – Zig Dulay for Bagahe
- Best Cinematography –
  - Ike Avellana for Respeto
  - T.M. Malones for Baconaua
- Best Editing – Lawrence Ang for Respeto
- Best Sound – Corinne de San Jose for Respeto
- Best Original Music Score – Pepe Manikan for Kiko Boksingero
- Best Production Design – Marxie Maolen Fadul for Nabubulok
- NETPAC Award – Respeto by Treb Monteras II

=== Short films ===
- Best Short Film – Hilom by P.R. Patindol
  - Special Jury Prize – Fatima Marie Torres and the Invasion of Space Shuttle Pinas 25 by Carlo Francisco Manatad
  - Audience Choice Award – Nakauwi Na by Marvin Cabangunay and Jaynus Olaivar
- Best Direction – E. del Mundo for Manong ng Pa-Aling
- Best Screenplay – Duwi Monteagudo (aka Joseph Israel Laban) for Bawod
- NETPAC Award – Aliens Ata by Glenn Barit
