= Patay na si Hesus =

2016 film by Victor Villanueva

- Theatrical release poster
- Directed by: Victor Villanueva
- Screenplay by: Fatrick Tabada; Moira Lang
- Story by: Fatrick Tabada
- Produced by: Jill Anoba-Yap; Bianca Balbuena; Raymond Lee; Rex A. Tiri
- Starring: Jaclyn Jose; Vincent Viado; Chai Fonacier; Melde Montañez; Mailes Kanapi
- Cinematography: Ruel Dahis Antipuesto
- Edited by: Philip Muana
- Music by: Francis De Veyra
- Production company: T-Rex Entertainment Productions
- Distributed by: Sony Pictures Worldwide Acquisitions (Philippines)
- Release dates: October 13, 2016 (QCinema); August 16, 2017 (Commercial release)
- Running time: 90 minutes
- Country: Philippines
- Languages: Cebuano; Filipino; English

Patay na si Hesus (lit. 'Jesus is Already Dead') is a 2016 Filipino black comedy road film directed by Victor Villanueva and written by Fatrick Tabada and Moira Lang from a story concept developed by Tabada.

Produced by T-Rex Entertainment, the film was theatrically released on October 13, 2016, as part of QCinema and a commercial release on August 16, 2017.

== Plot ==
Iyay, a food vendor in Cebu City, learns of the death of her estranged husband, Hesus, in Dumaguete. She decides to drive her van to the funeral and forces her apathetic children, Hubert who is diagnosed with Down syndrome, trans man Judith Marie "Jude" and penniless, jobless Jay to join her. Bert quickly agrees, while Jude decides to apply for leave and bring his adoptive daughter Mia with him, and Jay refuses, but gives in to Iyay's demands. Their pet dog Judas comes along as well.

Along the way, Jude and Jay argue over the latter still not having a job and not passing the board exams, and the former not giving any benefits to the family despite his high-paying job, after which Iyay tells that there are two knives they could use, and whoever dies is buried with their father.

During a stopover at Carcar and while eating lechon, Iyay discovers that her stall is being forcibly relocated. She tries to go back, but relents when Jay uses reverse psychology on her.

Later, Jay tries to urinate and run away - but Jude catches up to him. Jude and Iyay later bicker over their father's misdeeds, including cheating on her with his mistress. Jude also gets irritated by how Iyay often addresses him, by his birth name Judith Marie, in retaliation to Jude bringing up his father. When Mia asks what is puki (vagina) after Iyay brings it up, Jay and Jude come up with absurd meanings.

They make another stopover to the Simala Shrine, where Iyay picks up Hesus's deranged sister Lucy. On the way, Lucy reveals that early on, when Iyay and Hesus eloped to Dumaguete, Iyay was illiterate in Cebuano but calm and controlled, compared to the current situation where she is now fluent in Cebuano and rather violent. Suddenly, Lucy defecates, triggering a foul smell in the minivan. Stopping by the road, Lucy strips completely in a fit of insanity before being covered by Iyay.

At another stopover, Jude discovers that his girlfriend Mary, whom he had thought to be in an out-of-town seminar, was in fact flirting with another girl. Jude flies into a rage, attacking a cake vendor in the process. Later in a park, he lashes out at Mary for her deception. Upon leaving, a heartbroken Jude leaves Mia to Mary.

At another stopover, Jay reveals to Jude that he impregnated his girlfriend. Jude lambasts him for failing at sex education despite five years at college. Unbeknownst to them, Bert leaves the van, as does Lucy, who hops along someone else's motorcycle. This leads to Iyay and Jay searching for him, which involves stumbling into a parade and a criminal who is also named Bert. Meanwhile, Jude is approached by a few local drunkards and gets drunk with them upon learning one of the men is heartbroken as well.

After reuniting with Jude, she and Iyay are told that Bert asked for directions to Santander Port and took a bus going there. They rush to the port, and see a ferry leave, plunging them to despair, only to discover him and Judas still in port. While waiting for another ferry, Jay reveals that he impregnated his girlfriend to Iyay, during which she decides not to lash out at him, saying it's too melodramatic. He then reveals that he skipped his third board exam, for which she does slap him.

After taking the ferry, they arrive at Hesus' home. There, they meet Linda, Hesus' second wife, and her children. Iyay comes to terms with Jude being a trans-man, Jay talks to his half-brother, and women become attracted to Bert. At Hesus' casket, Iyay gazes at Hesus for a few moments before slamming her hands onto it, unwittingly causing the glass to break and the casket to fall. Iyay opens up about life without Hesus and revealed that he in fact wanted to mend his relationship with Iyay before meeting Linda, and that she could not always keep up with their problems, after which Bert remarks that she did her best despite such challenges and that she is still loved by her children.

Iyay later tells Linda that she can manage being a single mother, and she and the children stay for the burial. The next day, Hudas is run over and killed. Iyay's family mourns the dog's death, ignoring the funeral procession of Hesus behind them. (The film has a caption saying "Patay na rin si Hudas" afterwards, to complement the film name).

The film ends with them heading home to Cebu and in between, they talk about how Jay would raise his child, Jude being single and Hubert attracting someone at the funeral, going to a beach, and passing thru a church where one of its statues falls off.

== Cast ==
- Jaclyn Jose as Iyay
- Chai Fonacier as Judith "Jude" Marie
- Melde Montañez as Jay
- Vincent Viado as Hubert
- Angelina Kanapi as Sister Lucy/Aunt Lucy
- Mailes Kanapi as Linda
- Albert Chan Paran as Drunkard Man
- Harvey Quimbo as Drunkard Man
- Miel Espinoza as Mia
- Bernard Catindig as Bert
- Therese Villarante as Sarah
- Sheen Gener as Mary

== Release ==
The film was initially released in October 2016 as an entry at the QCinema International Film Festival. In May 2017, an advance screening of the film was held during the launch of the InterAksyon Cinema Club. Columbia Pictures Philippines became the official distributor of the film in July 2017.

The film was one of the 12 official entries at the 2017 Pista ng Pelikulang Pilipino which ran from August 16 to 22, 2017.

== Accolades ==
Award / Film Festival	Category	Recipient(s)	Result
QCinema International Film Festival 2016	Audience Choice	Patay na si Hesus	Won
QCinema International Film Festival 2016	Gender Sensitivity Award	Patay na si Hesus	Won
Pista ng Pelikulang Pilipino	Jury's Choice	Patay na si Hesus	Won
