= Treb Monteras II =

- Occupations: Film director, music video director

Alberto "Treb" Monteras II is a Filipino film director and music video director. He is best known for directing the feature film Respeto.

Monteras has amassed a large number music video credits directing music videos for Bamboo, Rivermaya, Sugarfree, Hale, Martin Nievera, Gary Valenciano and Regine Velasquez among other notable artists.

== Life and career ==
Monteras graduated from the University of Santo Tomas with a Bachelor of Fine Arts Major in Advertising and pursued his passion for filmmaking and studied at the Mowelfund Film Institute, and at the International Institute for Film and the Arts. Later in 2016, he attended the American Society of Cinematographer’s Masterclass.

Monteras´s debut feature film Respeto, starring Abra, Dido de la Paz and Loonie, premiered at the New York Asian Film Festival. It also won the awards for best feature length film, Best Supporting Actor, Best Editing, Best Cinematography, and Best Sound at the 2017 Cinemalaya Film Festival.

== Filmography ==
Film

Year	Film	Note	Note
2017	Respeto	Director/Writer	Feature Film

Television

Year	Film	Note	Note
2011	Party Pilipinas	Director	TV musical Variety Show
2012	Chef Boy Logro: Kusina Master	Director	TV Cooking Show
2012–2018	Sarap Diva	Director	TV Talk Show
2014–2015	Myx Ambushed	Director	TV show
2020	Trip to Quiapo	Director	Documentary online series
2021	Flex	Director	TV Variety Show
2022–present	Family Feud Philippines	Director	Game Show
2024–present	Bubble Gang	Director	Sketch Comedy

== Awards ==
Year	Film	Award	Category	Result
2018	Respeto	International Film Festival of India	Best Debut Film of a Director	Won
2018	Respeto	Exground Film Festival	Jury Prize - Youth Days Category	Won
2018	Respeto	Carrousel international du film de Rimouski	Best Youth Feature	Won
2018	Respeto	New York Asian Film Festival	Silver Tiger Uncaged Award for Best Feature Film	Won
