= Magikland =

Theme park in Negros Occidental, Philippines

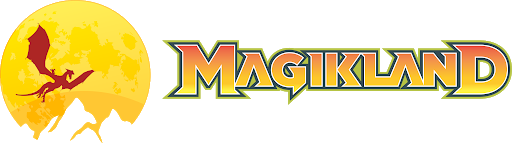
- Interactive map of Magikland
- Location: Sitio Cabug, Brgy. Guinhalaran, Silay, Negros Occidental, Philippines
- Coordinates: 10°46′49″N 122°58′21″E
- Status: Operating
- Opened: September 27, 2019; 6 years ago
- Owner: Aton Land and Leisure
- Slogan: "Live the Dream, Feel the Magic"
- Operating season: Year-Round
- Attendance: At least 72,000 (2019)
- Area: 5 hectares (12 acres)
- Website: www.magiklandpark.com

Magikland is a Filipino amusement park located in Silay, Negros Occidental. It is also known as the first outdoor theme park in the Visayas. The park is owned and operated by Aton Land and Leisure, Inc.

== History ==
The theme park was founded by Atty. Simplicio Palanca, the chairman of the board of Aton Land and Leisure, Inc. Palanca was known as the "Mr. Showman" in the province, on account of his taste in the predilection towards the entertainment; in fact, Palanca owned theaters before. It was his dream to establish the theme park, to give happiness and entertainment to all the Negrosanons. Subsequently, Reynaldo Bantug, president of the Aton Land and Leisure Inc., former 3rd District Representative Albee Benitez, Willy Au, and others, helped Palanca to build the first Filipino Theme Park in the country.

=== Construction ===
In April 2017, the groundbreaking and 12 rides were transpired and installed. The construction was assisted by the IAAPA (International Association of Amusement Parks and Attraction) and PHILAAPA (Philippines Association of Amusement Parks and Attractions) to make sure everything is well-designed according to the management's plan. Magikland is built granting its utmost safety measures, which the management hired well-trained technicians to maintain and ensure the safety of all the newly installed rides. On September 27, 2019, the soft-opening of the theme park betided.

Its operations were temporarily halted sometime in 2020 due to the COVID-19 pandemic. It resumed operations on November 14, 2020, with appropriate health protocols implemented as precautionary measures against COVID-19.

== Park Layout and design ==
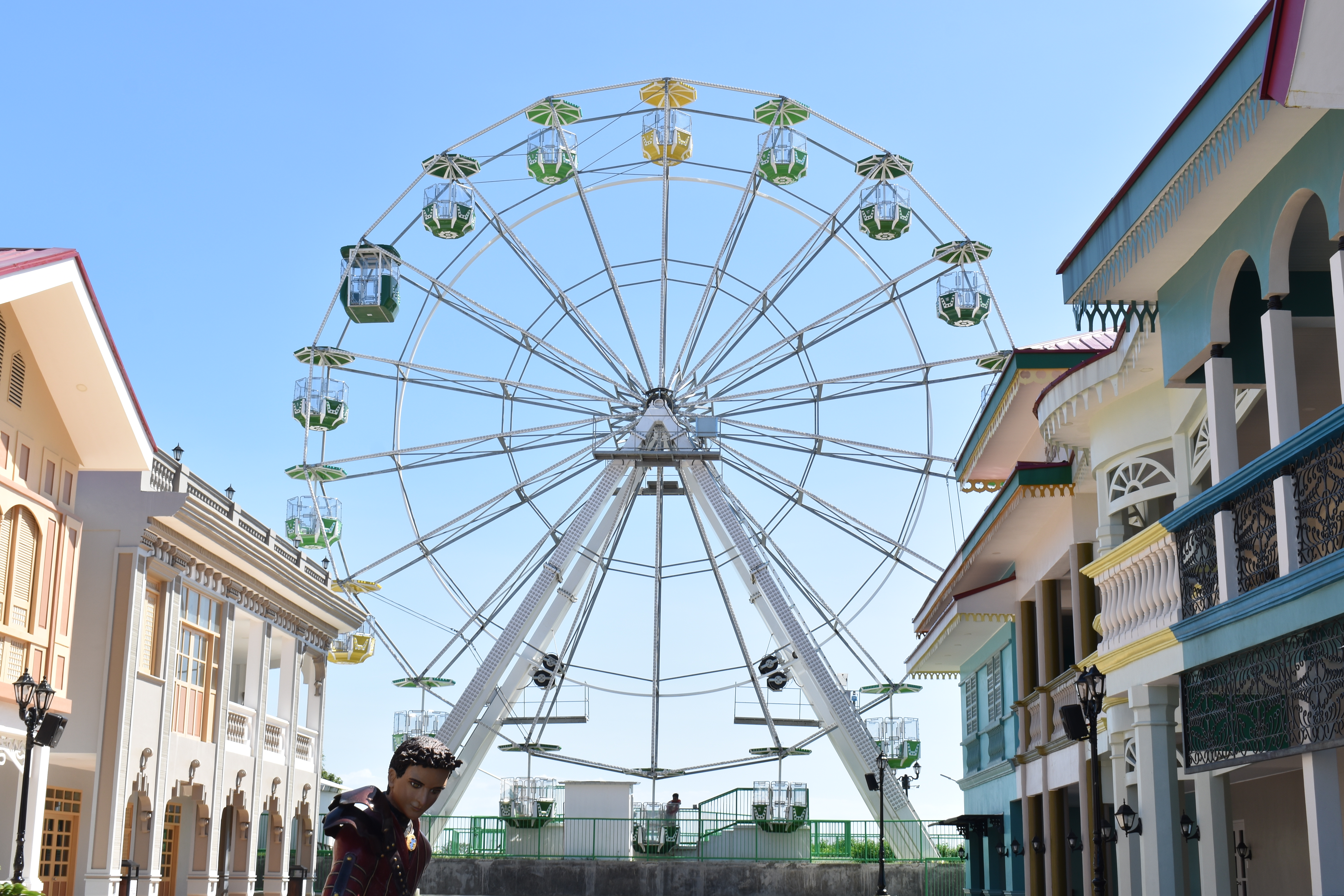
Silay Eye: A 25 m (82 ft) high Ferris Wheel that offers the scenic view of Silay City.

The theme of Magikland is based on Negros folklore and legend, adapting the legend of Bakunawa (the moon-eating dragon) to make it modern and fun, while still bearing respect to local culture. The park has three themed zones, namely the Magical Zone, Mystical Zone, and Cultural Zone. The Magical Zone is designed to cater younger generation; with six rides installed, specifically the Crazy Surf, Magic Bike, Smasher Cars, Happy Swing, Mt. Kanlaon, and Magikland Express. On the other hand, the Mystical Zone is designed to cater thrill seekers; with four rides installed, specifically the Disk'O, Sky Tower, Family Swinger, and Crazy Trail. Lastly, the Cultural Zone is designed to cater jingoistic people; with two rides installed, specifically the Silay Eye, and Fantasy Carousel.

The Aton Land and Leisure Inc. plans to have lifestyle and commercial buildings, residential area, theaters, and additional new zones soon.

== Branding ==
=== Characters ===
Magikland's main mascot is Bakunawa, the moon-eating dragon. Along with Bakunawa are the four child-warriors who are the champions of Magikland. The children, whose names pay homage to the local landscape are Boy Bakunawa, Mara Marapara, Pat Patag, and Kit Kanlaon.

=== Film ===
Peque Gallaga, a Filipino filmmaker, announced that the Magikland theme park has prompted his live-action animated film of the same name. The producers were Albee Benitez (for Brightlight Productions), Lore Reyes, and Gallaga himself. The actors are Miggs Cuaderno, Princess Aguilar, Elijah Alejo, Josh Eugenio, Hailey Mendes, and KenKen Nguyad. The film was released on December 25, 2020, as it is officially part of the 46th Metro Manila Film Festival.

== Gallery ==
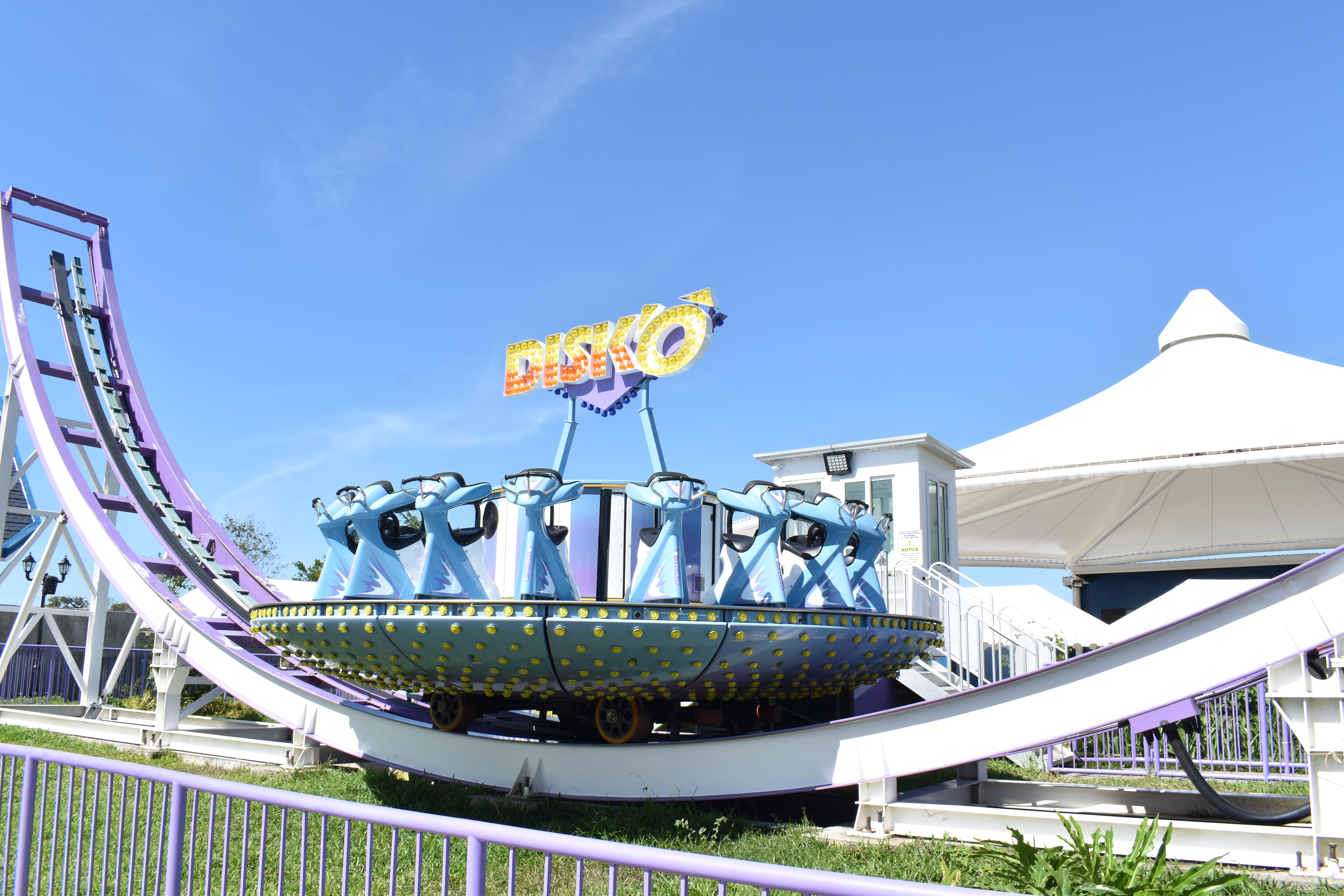
Disk'O

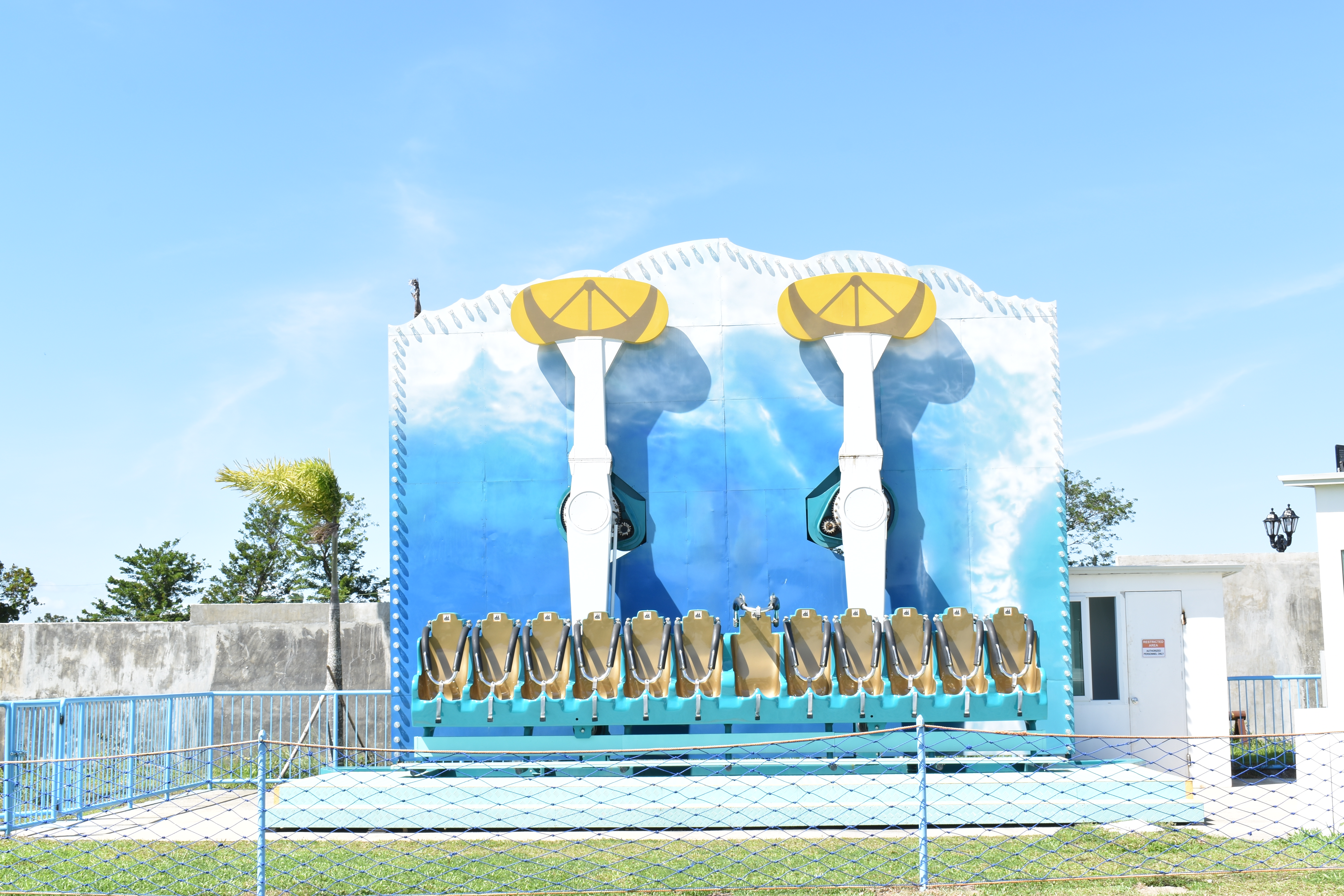

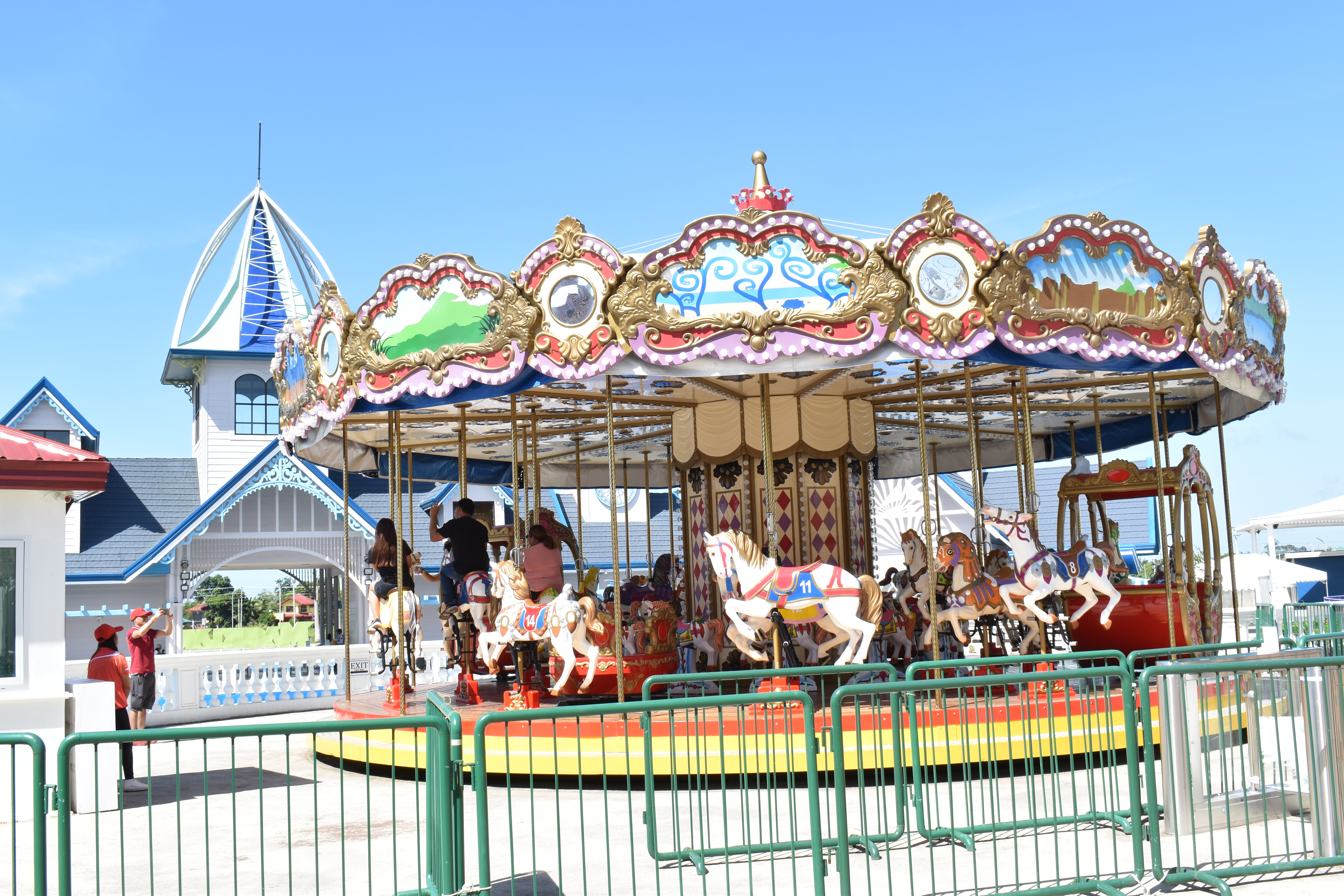
Fantasy Carousel

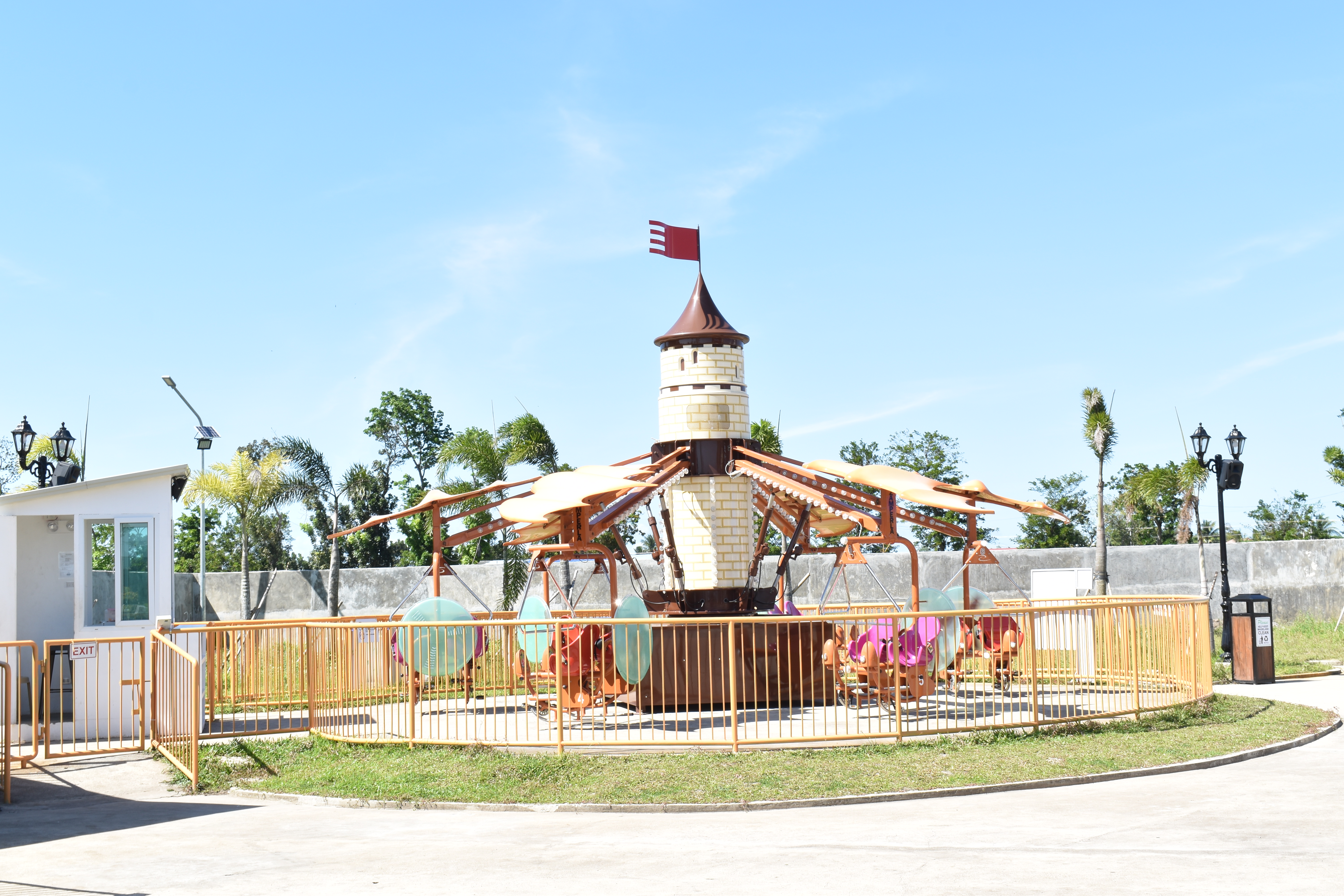
Family Swinger

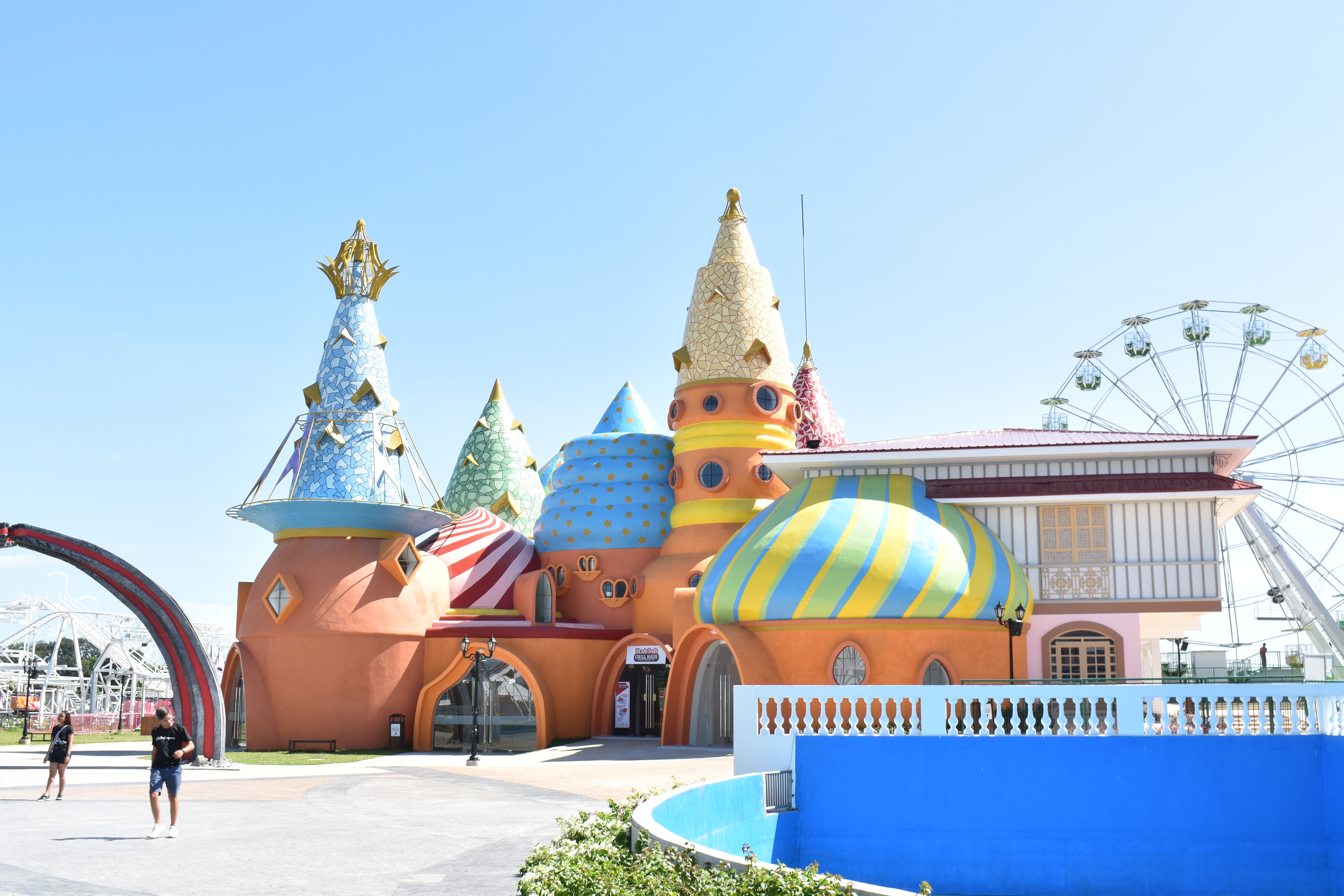

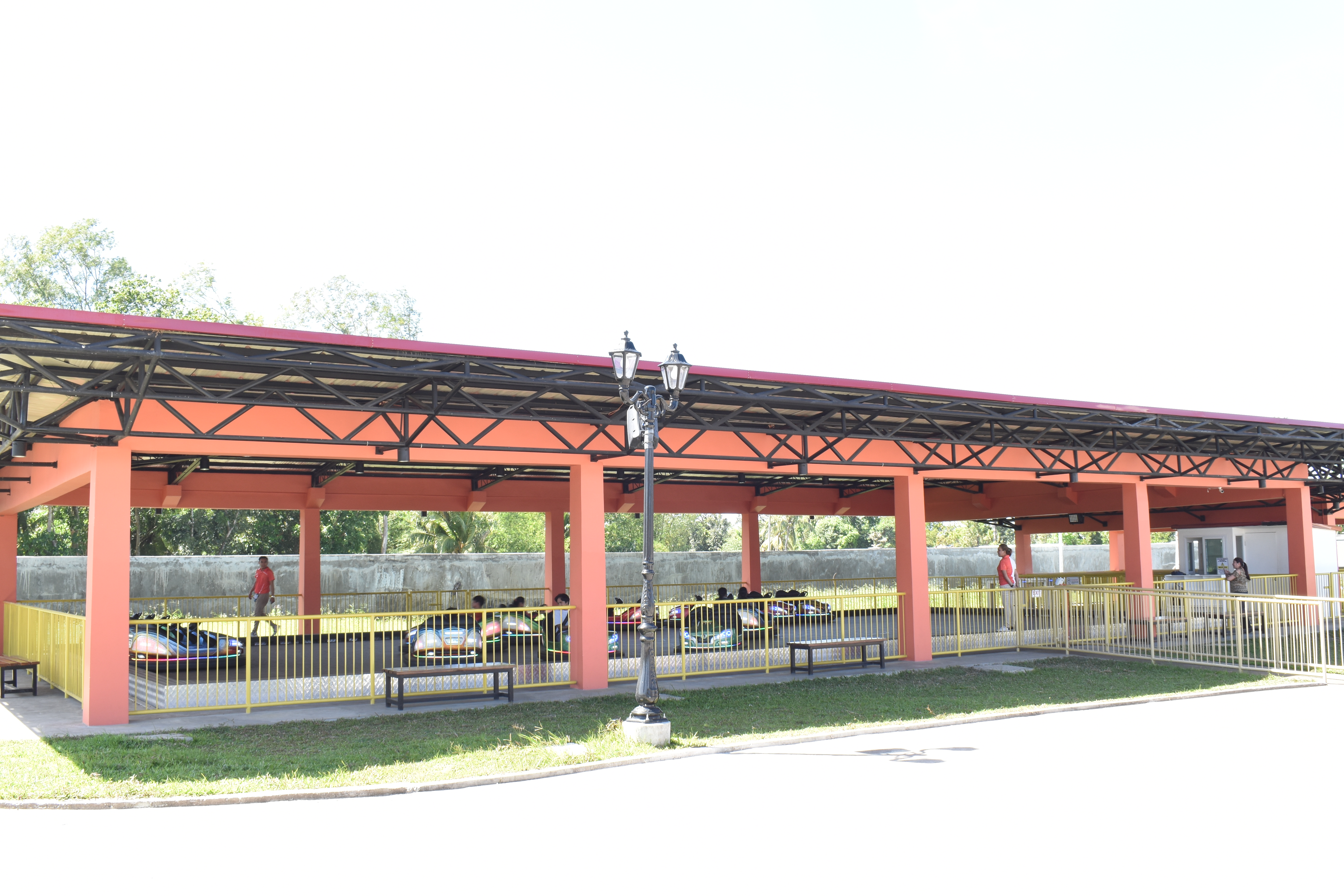
Smasher Cards

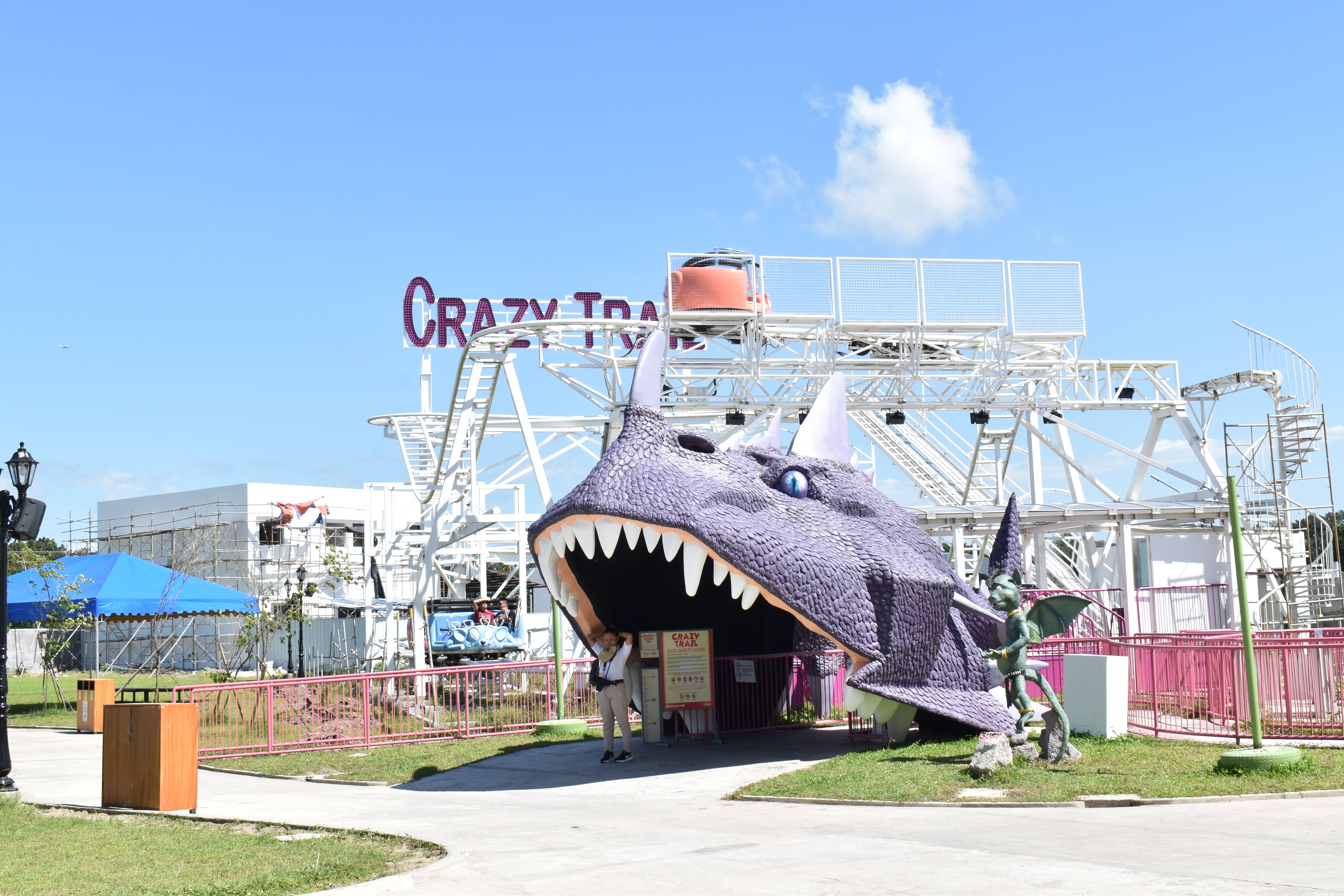
Crazy Trail

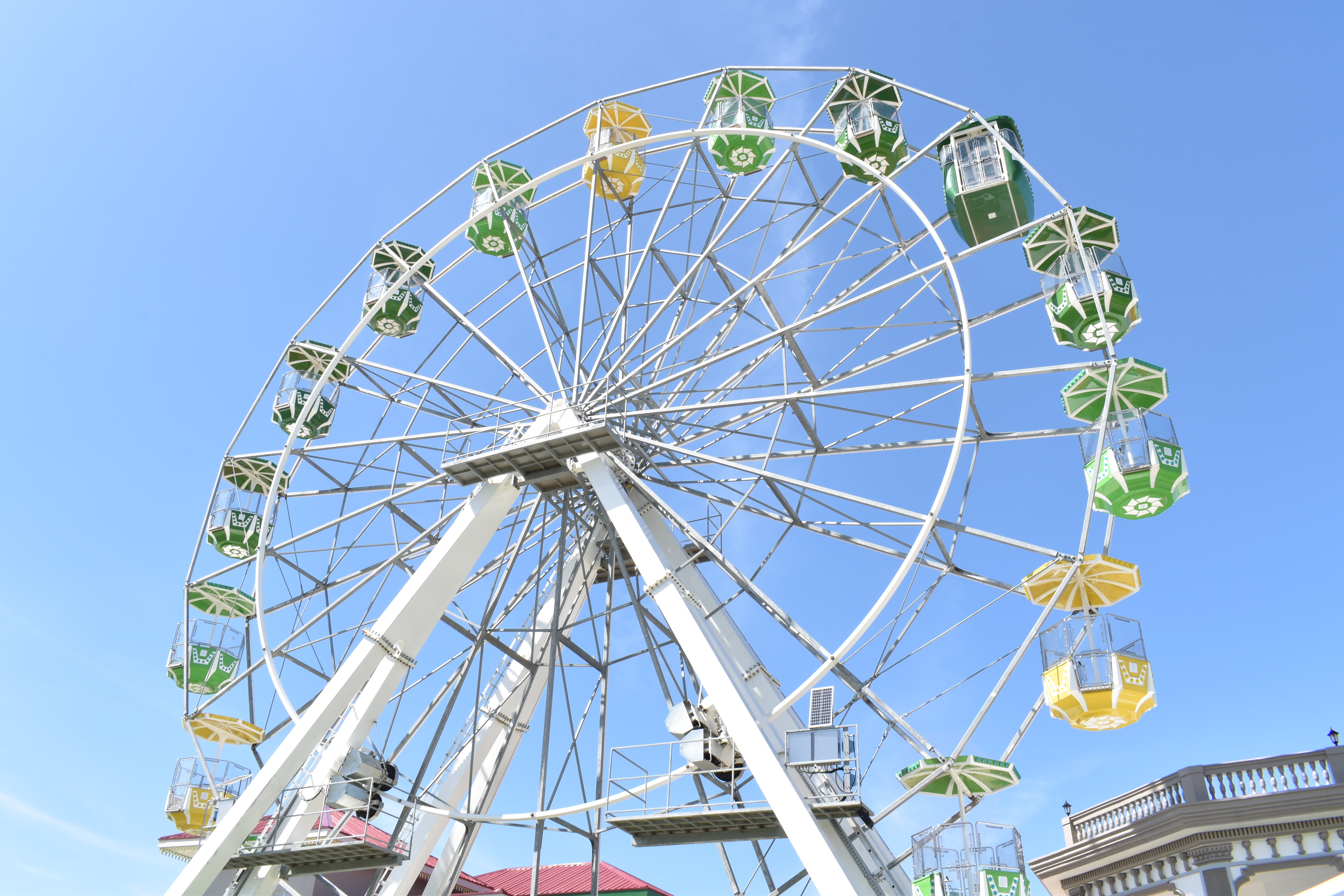
Silay Eye
