= Birdshot (film) =

- Theatrical poster for the Philippine release
- Directed by: Mikhail Red
- Written by: Mikhail Red; Rae Red
- Produced by: Pamela L. Reyes
- Starring: Mary Joy Apostol; Arnold Reyes; Ku Aquino; John Arcilla
- Cinematography: Mycko David
- Edited by: Jay Halili; Mikhail Red
- Music by: Teresa Barrozo
- Production companies: PelikulaRED; Globe Studios
- Distributed by: Tuko Film Productions; Buchi Boy Films; CJ Entertainment; Netflix
- Release dates: October 28, 2016 (Tokyo); August 16, 2017 (PPP); March 26, 2018 (Netflix)
- Running time: 116 minutes
- Country: Philippines
- Language: Filipino
- Budget: ₱14 million

Birdshot is a 2016 Philippine coming-of-age thriller film written, directed and edited by Mikhail Red. Starring Mary Joy Apostol, Arnold Reyes, Ku Aquino, and John Arcilla, its story revolves around a farm girl (Apostol) in the countryside, who unwittingly kills a Philippine eagle (an endangered species locally known as the haribon), and two police officers (Reyes and Arcilla) assigned to track down the haribon's killer while investigating the mysterious disappearance of a busload of farmers en route to Manila.

The film was selected as the Filipino entry for the Best Foreign Language Film at the 90th Academy Awards, but it was not nominated. Birdshot is the first Filipino film released worldwide by Netflix.

== Plot ==
Diego Mariano (Ku Aquino) is the caretaker of the land surrounding a forest sanctuary. He is the father of 14-year-old Maya (Mary Joy Apostol), whose mother died in childbirth. Maya wants to explore the land beyond the family's isolated shack. Diego wants his daughter to be self-sufficient, so he teaches her how to fire a gun. After failing her first shooting lessons, Maya wanders into the forest with her father's double-barreled shotgun and deliberately kills a Philippine eagle, an endangered animal.

Meanwhile, newly-recruited police officer Domingo (Arnold Reyes) goes to the area to investigate the mysterious disappearance of farmers en route to Manila on a bus, but is ordered to stop. Domingo's partner Mendoza (John Arcilla) and their commander De la Paz (Dido de la Paz) believe that Domingo should focus on finding the killer of the Philippine eagle instead.

== Cast ==
- Mary Joy Apostol as Maya
- Arnold Reyes as Domingo
- John Arcilla as Mendoza
- Ku Aquino as Diego
- Angie Ferro as Lola

== Production ==
Birdshot was directed by Mikhail Red, who wrote the screenplay with his cousin, Rae Red. Red was also the film editor opposite Jay Halili. The cinematographer was Mycko David. The music used in the film was composed by Teresa Barrozo.

Red and his cousin began writing the script in 2014. Producer Pamela L. Reyes submitted it to the Doha Film Institute, which granted production funding for the film in early 2015. After winning the CJ Entertainment Award at the Busan Film Festival's Asian Project Market, other investors granted funding, including TBA Studios. The film project was selected at the Festival des 3 Continents' Produire au Sud workshop to improve Birdshot and its screenplay. Birdshot's PelikulaRED studio (owned by Reyes and Red) managed to co-produce the film with Tuko Film Productions and Buchi Boy Productions. The total budget of the film was ₱14 million.

Red was inspired by a shooting incident in 2008, where a three-year-old Philippine eagle was shot and cooked by a Bukidnon farmer in Mount Kitanglad. Principal photography lasted for 23 days. Scenes were shot in the provinces of Isabela and Rizal, as well as at the Philippine Eagle Sanctuary in Davao City.

The color red is a prominent element in the film, signifying important scenes and details.

== Release ==
Birdshot was first screened at film festivals outside the Philippines before it was screened in the country. The film made its debut at the 2016 Tokyo International Film Festival and was screened in 14 other film festivals before it made its local debut at the 13th Cinemalaya Independent Film Festival in August of the following year.

The film was also screened as one of the twelve official entries at the 1st Pista ng Pelikulang Pilipino.

It was acquired by streaming service Netflix and released on the platform on March 26, 2018, in all available countries. Birdshot became the first Filipino-produced film to be made available on Netflix Philippines.

== Reception ==
In a review for Variety, film critic Richard Kuipers described Birdshot as a “gripping combination of police procedural and coming-of-age drama”, and noted that its social commentary evokes the 2009 Maguindanao massacre. He also praised Apostol’s performance as “impressive” and highlighted Teresa Barrozo’s “haunting soundscapes”.

=== Accolades ===
The film won Best Picture in the Asian Future category at the 2016 Tokyo International Film Festival and was selected for the Ingmar Bergman International Debut Award at the Goteborg Film Festival.

Accolades received by Birdshot
Award	Year	Category	Recipient(s)	Result	Ref.
Adelaide Festival	2017	Best Feature	Mikhail Red	Nominated	
ASEAN Film Awards	2017	Best Actress	Mary Joy Apostol	Won	
Australian Academy of Cinema and Television Arts	2017	Best Asian Film	Birdshot	Nominated	
FAMAS Award	2018	Best Picture	Birdshot	Nominated	
FAMAS Award	2018	Best Director	Mikhail Red	Nominated	
FAMAS Award	2018	Best Supporting Actor	John Arcilla	Nominated	
FAMAS Award	2018	Best Cinematography	Mycko David	Nominated	
FAMAS Award	2018	Best Production Design	Michael N. Español	Nominated	
Gawad Urian Award	2018	Best Film "Pinakamahusay na Pelikula"	Birdshot	Nominated	
Gawad Urian Award	2018	Best Direction "Pinakamahusay na Direksyon"	Mikhail Red	Nominated	
Gawad Urian Award	2018	Best Supporting Actor "Pinakamahusay na Pangalawang Aktor"	John Arcilla	Nominated	
Gawad Urian Award	2018	Best Supporting Actor "Pinakamahusay na Pangalawang Aktor"	Arnold Reyes	Nominated	
Gawad Urian Award	2018	Best Cinematography "Pinakamahusay na Sinematograpiya"	Mycko David	Nominated	
Gawad Urian Award	2018	Best Sound "Pinakamahusay na Tunog"	Aian Caro	Nominated	
Luna Award	2018	Best Supporting Actor	John Arcilla	Won	
Luna Award	2018	Best Supporting Actor	Ku Aquino	Nominated	
Luna Award	2018	Best Cinematography	Mycko David	Nominated	
Luna Award	2018	Best Editing	Jay Halili, Mikhail Red	Nominated	
Palm Springs International Film Festival	2018	Best Foreign Language Film	Mikhail Red	Nominated	
Pista ng Pelikulang Pilipino	2017	Critics Choice Award	Birdshot	Won	
PMPC Star Awards for Movies	2018	Indie Movie of the Year	Birdshot	Nominated	
PMPC Star Awards for Movies	2018	Indie Movie Director of the Year	Mikhail Red	Nominated	
PMPC Star Awards for Movies	2018	Movie Supporting Actor of the Year	Ku Aquino	Nominated	
PMPC Star Awards for Movies	2018	Movie Supporting Actor of the Year	Arnold Reyes	Won	
PMPC Star Awards for Movies	2018	New Movie Actress of the Year	Mary Joy Apostol	Nominated	
PMPC Star Awards for Movies	2018	Indie Movie Screenwriter of the Year	Rae Red, Mikhail Red	Nominated	
PMPC Star Awards for Movies	2018	Indie Movie Cinematographer of the Year	Mycko David	Won	
PMPC Star Awards for Movies	2018	Indie Movie Production Designer of the Year	Michael N. Español	Won	
PMPC Star Awards for Movies	2018	Indie Movie Editor of the Year	Jay Halili, Mikhail Red	Nominated	
PMPC Star Awards for Movies	2018	Indie Movie Musical Scorer of the Year	Teresa Barrozo	Nominated	
PMPC Star Awards for Movies	2018	Indie Movie Sound Engineer of the Year	Alex Tomboc, Lamberto Casas Jr.	Nominated	
The EDDYS	2018	Best Picture	Birdshot	Nominated	
The EDDYS	2018	Best Director	Mikhail Red	Won	
The EDDYS	2018	Best Actress	Mary Joy Apostol	Won	
The EDDYS	2018	Best Supporting Actor	Arnold Reyes	Nominated	
The EDDYS	2018	Best Cinematography	Mycko David	Won	
The EDDYS	2018	Best Production Design	Michael N. Español	Nominated	
The EDDYS	2018	Best Editing	Jay Halili, Mikhail Red	Nominated	
Tokyo International Film Festival	2016	Asian Future Best Film Award	Birdshot	Won	

== See also ==
- List of submissions to the 90th Academy Awards for Best Foreign Language Film
- List of Philippine submissions for the Academy Award for Best Foreign Language Film
