= Neomanila =

- Theatrical release poster
- Directed by: Mikhail Red
- Written by: Mikhail Red; Rae Red; Zig Dulay
- Produced by: Nicole Runi; Sara Santiago
- Starring: Eula Valdez; Timothy Castillo
- Cinematography: Mycko David
- Edited by: Jeffrey Loreno; Mikhail Red
- Music by: Paul Sigua; Myka Magsaysay
- Production companies: Waning Crescent Arts Inc.; PelikulaRED; Monoxide Works
- Distributed by: TBA Studios
- Release dates: October 20, 2017 (QCinema Film Festival); March 13, 2019 (Philippines)
- Running time: 101 minutes
- Country: Philippines
- Language: Filipino

Neomanila is a 2017 Philippine neo-noir thriller film directed and co-written by Mikhail Red. Set in modern Manila amid the war on drugs, it tells the story of Irma (Eula Valdez), a hitwoman who trains the young orphan Toto (Timothy Castillo) to become a professional assassin. It premiered at the 2017 Quezon City International Film Festival from October 20–28, before having a Philippine theatrical release on March 13, 2019. The Hollywood Reporter described the film as a "slick thriller".

== Plot ==
In modern Manila amid the war on drugs, street orphan Toto (Timothy Castillo) raises money in an effort to bail out his imprisoned brother Kiko, who is terrified that the gang involved in an illegal drug trade he is running might be plotting to kill him. When Toto finds out that, indeed, he and his brother have become targets of assassination by local gangsters as well as corrupt officers, he is rescued by Irma (Eula Valdez), a professional hitwoman who introduces herself as a friend of his dead mother, with whom she spent time as a hawker of counterfeit goods. Irma's assignments are set up by a corrupt police officer named "Sarge". Although occupied with another assignment, Irma offers Toto refuge and trains him to become an assassin. Toto comes to see Irma as a surrogate mother.

== Cast ==
- Eula Valdez as Irma
- Timothy Castillo as Toto
- Rocky Salumbides as Raul
- Jess Mendoza as Dugo
- Angeline Bayani as Irene
- Raul Morit as Mackoy

== Production ==
Neomanila was the third feature film of writer-director Mikhail Red, the first two being Rekorder (2013) and Birdshot (2016). According to Red, he had the idea for Neomanila after watching an interview conducted by the BBC, which had gone viral, of a married couple who both worked as hitmen at night. He added that his research mainly involved visiting Manila Police District precincts and recording violent events late at night: "We would hang around near the police station—Nightcrawler level. We would go to the actual crime scenes, and I recorded a lot on my phone."

Principal photography on the film began August 2017 and lasted 11 days, which is a relatively short schedule compared to the two-year period Red spent completing Birdshot. Although Red believes that shooting for two years is optimal for a production schedule, he elected releasing Neomanila immediately that year because he felt that extrajudicial killings (EJK), especially during the Philippine drug war, were a "very relevant" subject tackled in the film, and shooting in that period would eliminate its significance. The film was photographed by Birdshot cinematographer Mycko David, whom Red compared favorably to Roger Deakins. Aesthetically, Red shot the film with the Arri Alexa utilizing the cinéma vérité technique, emphasizing mostly hand-held camera movements. He prefers that his films deliver a "strong social commentary" by using genre, explaining that "It's a better way of reaching more people and getting your message across". Red insists that Neomanila is devoid of any political statement, and he believes that whether the characters' decisions are "moral" is best left for audiences to contemplate:

I guess what makes it different from most EJK-themed films—and there's a lot being done now—is the perspective. It's basically about people caught in the middle of the drug war, literally, because they're the middlemen. They're morally ambiguous. I'm always interested in that, where you have very likable criminals, going up against corrupt cops. It's very gray. You don’t know: Who’s good? Who’s bad? Is this justified? I wouldn't say it's political because even the characters themselves, they're unaware, oblivious to the politics of it. They don't talk about the politics of the whole situation. They just do it for the money. It's like a lens, looking at the whole situation, and it keeps throwing questions at the audience. It's up to you to decide: is this moral? It's up to you to question yourself.

== Release and reception ==
Neomanila premiered at the 2017 Quezon City International Film Festival from October 20–28, and had a Philippine wide release on March 13, 2019. The review-aggregation website Rotten Tomatoes gives the film a score of 100 percent (based on five reviews) and a weighted average of 8 out of 10. Clarence Tsui for The Hollywood Reporter called the film a "slick thriller", extending praise to Eula Valdez's against-type role and Tim Castillo's "nuanced performance". Wanggo Gallaga of InterAksyon.com wrote, "It's a powerful film that doesn't pull its punches".

== See also ==
- List of films with a 100% rating on Rotten Tomatoes
