= Balangiga: Howling Wilderness =

- Theatrical release poster
- Directed by: Khavn De La Cruz (credited as Khavn)
- Written by: Jerry Gracio, Khavn, Achinette Villamor
- Produced by: Edong Canlas, Khavn, Achinette Villamor
- Starring: Justine Samson; Pio Del Rio; Warren Tuaño; Daniel Palisa; Don Gordon Bell; Jun Sabayton
- Cinematography: Albert Banzon
- Edited by: Carlo Francisco Manatad
- Music by: Khavn
- Production company: QCinema Film Festival
- Distributed by: Sine Screen stylized as CineScreen
- Release date: October 20, 2017
- Running time: 113 minutes
- Country: Philippines
- Languages: Waray Waray; Filipino
- Budget: ₱1.2 million (est.)

Balangiga: Howling Wilderness is a 2017 Filipino arthouse historical drama film directed by Khavn De La Cruz. It is one of the circle competition entries to the 5th QCinema International Film Festival or QCinema. This movie shows, in the eyes of an eight-year-old, the tragedy that occurred in the days of 1901 when the Americans were supposed to identify with the Balangiga and other parts of Samar, including the events following the brutal massacre of several Samarnon and how they fled elsewhere to the neighboring island. The movie's shooting location took place in different parts of Samar, Leyte and Zambales (Central Luzon). Although there were various issues the movie received just before its release to the public, it still managed to receive several top recognition from various prestigious award-giving bodies in the Philippines, including the highest "Best Picture" award. The director of this movie receives “Best Director” as well as the movie stars who were based in Tacloban City.

It had a Philippine nationwide theatrical release from August 15–21, 2018 in selected SM Cinemas, Gateway Cineplex, Robinsons Movieworld and Cinema '76 theaters as part of the Special Feature Section of 2nd Pista ng Pelikulang Pilipino.

It was also shown as part of World Cinema section of the 24th edition of International Film Festival of Kerala in India, and also exhibited in Exground Film Festival in Wiesbaden, Germany last November 2018; further, it was also selected to be screened at the 20th edition of Jeonju International Film Festival held at the city of Jeonju, North Jeolla Province, South Korea in May 2019 under the Newtro Jeonju section, which was created to celebrate the 20th anniversary of Jeonju IFF and a special program that sheds light on the contemporary artists who have shared their vision with JIFF for the last 20 years. And, was awarded the coveted Jury Prize at the 5th Bangkok ASEAN Film Festival during the closing ceremony held in Cinema Central World, Bangkok, Thailand.

== Cast ==
=== Main cast ===
- Justine Samson as Kulas
- Pio Del Rio as Apoy Buroy
- Warren Tuaño as Bola
- Daniel Palisa as American soldier

=== Supporting cast ===
- Jun Sabayton
- Althea Vega
- Don Gordon Bell
- Lourd de Veyra
- Roxlee

== Reception ==
The film has received critical acclaim in the Philippines.

According to Oggs Cruz of Rappler.com, "Balangiga: Howling Wilderness navigates its seemingly simple narrative around the very relevant tenuous relations the Philippines has with America. The film has clear political implications and suggestions. Yet as soon as it ends with an ironic burst of animated hues and figures, it graduates from being a mere document on the sufferings and indignity of a nation under a colonial power's regime."

Prof. Joel David notes in his review, "Khavn deploys cinematic tricks (stop-motion animation, disorienting lenses, startling drone footage, etc.) as well as basic special effects that serve to emblematize the childhood world of Kulas. His persistent (though inevitably sordid) humor, tenderhearted embrace of Otherness, and contempt for everything represented by modern existence and its enforcement via wholesale genocidal-if-necessary violence – these make of "Balangiga" all that Filipinos can claim so far as their retribution for the incredible injustice visited on the country's distant central island over a century ago."

Arnold Alamon of Sunstar reviewed the film positively and writes, "the film Balangiga: Howling Wilderness is a cinematic experience that is difficult to put in words and is better felt than described. [...] The end is not to cease but to destroy, or as the film puts succinctly – WAZAK!"

However, according to Businessworld the film was not rated/graded by the Cinema Evaluation Board of the Film Development Council of the Philippines and writes, "One reviewer finds it “a rambling narrative with no clear direction.” Another cites the attack against Catholicism, particularly “the grotesquely, lewd scene of a shaman masturbating while singing Salve Regina.” The reviewer concludes that “Over all, the Balangiga story is ultimately bigger than the story of hate, murder, and sexual perversion that this film unfortunately chose to focus on."

== Accolades ==
Year	Award-giving body	Recipient(s)	Award	Result
2017	QCinema International Film Festival	Balangiga: Howling Wilderness	Best Picture	Won
2017	QCinema International Film Festival	Khavn	Best Director	Won
2017	QCinema International Film Festival	Justine Samson	Best Actor	Won
2017	QCinema International Film Festival	Pio del Rio	Best Supporting Actor	Won
2018	66th Filipino Academy of Movie Arts and Sciences (FAMAS) Awards	Balangiga: Howling Wilderness	Best Picture	Won
2018	66th Filipino Academy of Movie Arts and Sciences (FAMAS) Awards	Khavn	Best Director	Nominated
2018	66th Filipino Academy of Movie Arts and Sciences (FAMAS) Awards	Justine Samson	Best Actor	Nominated
2018	66th Filipino Academy of Movie Arts and Sciences (FAMAS) Awards	Khavn, Achinette Villamor, Jerry Gracio	Best Original Screenplay	Won
2018	66th Filipino Academy of Movie Arts and Sciences (FAMAS) Awards	Albert Banzon	Best Cinematography	Won
2018	66th Filipino Academy of Movie Arts and Sciences (FAMAS) Awards	Marija Vicente, Timmy Harn and Zeus Bascon	Best Production Design	Won
2018	66th Filipino Academy of Movie Arts and Sciences (FAMAS) Awards	Carlo Francisco Manatad	Best Editing	Nominated
2018	66th Filipino Academy of Movie Arts and Sciences (FAMAS) Awards	Mikko Quizon and Stephen Lopez	Best Sound	Nominated
2018	66th Filipino Academy of Movie Arts and Sciences (FAMAS) Awards	Khavn	Best Musical Scoring	Nominated
2018	66th Filipino Academy of Movie Arts and Sciences (FAMAS) Awards	Gitik–Gitik (composed by Max Surban)	Best Original Song	Nominated
2018	66th Filipino Academy of Movie Arts and Sciences (FAMAS) Awards	Katurog Na (composed by Lolita Carbon)	Best Original Song	Won
2018	41st Gawad Urian Awards	Balangiga: Howling Wilderness	Best Film	Won
2018	41st Gawad Urian Awards	Khavn	Best Director	Nominated
2018	41st Gawad Urian Awards	Justine Samson	Best Actor	Nominated
2018	41st Gawad Urian Awards	Pio del Rio	Best Supporting Actor	Nominated
2018	41st Gawad Urian Awards	Khavn, Jerry Gracio	Best Original Screenplay	Nominated
2018	41st Gawad Urian Awards	Albert Banzon	Best Cinematography	Nominated
2018	41st Gawad Urian Awards	Marija Vicente, Timmy Harn and Zeus Bascon	Best Production Design	Nominated
2018	41st Gawad Urian Awards	Carlo Francisco Manatad	Best Editing	Nominated
2018	41st Gawad Urian Awards	Mikko Quizon and Stephen Lopez	Best Sound	Nominated
2018	41st Gawad Urian Awards	Khavn	Best Musical Scoring	Won
2018	36th Luna Awards of the Film Academy of the Philippines	Justine Samson	Best Actor	Nominated
2018	36th Luna Awards of the Film Academy of the Philippines	Khavn	Best Musical Scoring	Nominated
2018	36th Luna Awards of the Film Academy of the Philippines	Albert Banzon	Best Cinematography	Nominated
2018	12th Asia Pacific Screen Awards	Balangiga: Howling Wilderness	Best Feature Film	Nominated
2018	12th Asia Pacific Screen Awards	Balangiga: Howling Wilderness	UNESCO Award	Nominated
2019	5th Bangkok ASEAN Film Festival	Balangiga: Howling Wilderness	Jury Prize	Won
