= Noel Comia Jr. =

Filipino singer and actor (born 2004)

Noel M. Comia Jr.
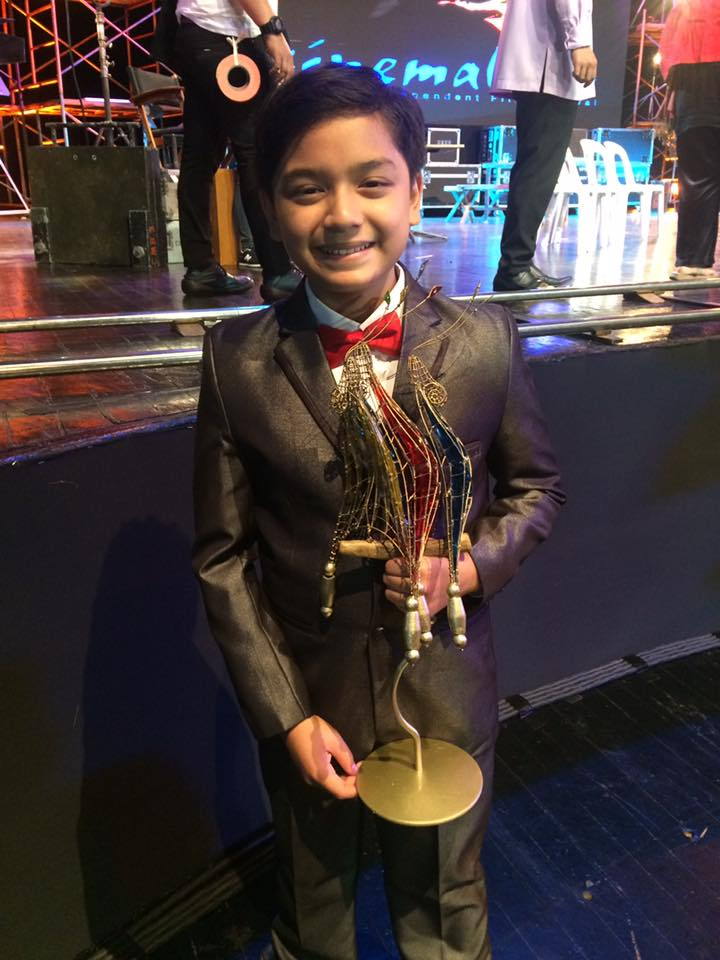
- Noel Comia Jr., with his award for Best Actor at Cinemalaya 2017
- Born: May 29, 2004 (age 22); Batangas City, Philippines
- Other names: Noel Comia, Kuya, Niño,
- Occupations: Singer; Actor; Model; Host; Voice actor
- Years active: 2010–present
- Agent: Viva Artists Agency (2026–present)
- Notable work: Niña Niño
- Height: 5 ft 6½ in
- Website: Noel Comia Jr. on Instagram

Noel Marasigan Comia Jr. (born May 29, 2004) is a Filipino actor, model, singer, television host, and voice actor. He received the Best Actor Award in 2017 at the Cinemalaya Philippine Independent Film Festival for his performance in Kiko Boksingero, becoming the youngest recipient of the award. He also competed in the third season of The Voice Kids Philippines, as a member of the Team Lea under coach Lea Salonga. Prior to his appearances, Comia had performed in various theatre productions and appeared in several television commercials.

He is currently under the management of Viva Artists Agency (VAA).

== Early life and education ==
Noel Comia Jr. was born to Filipino businessman Noel C. Comia Sr. and Elisa M. Comia.

When he was 6 years old, his parents took notice of his musical talents as he belted out songs on their karaoke machine, and playing harmonies on several musical instruments. The same year Noel Jr attended his first musical theater class in 'Kids Acts Philippines' TheCampArt Performing School, a professional children's theater company in the Philippines. There, he was trained as a scholar and has been a student and actor of the theater company ever since.

== Career ==
Noel Jr. began his career in musical theater and commercial modeling, first appearing as the lead role in a television commercial.

At 7 years old, he was cast as a member of the ensemble for KAPI's theater production of the popular childhood fairy tale, "Hansel and Gretel". He has performed in more than 20 theater productions.

On theater performance and modeling, Noel Comia Jr. is also a singer, and was a part of The Voice Kids (Philippines season 3). He was one of Team Lea's top 8 artists, and was eliminated in the Sing-offs part of the competition. In March 2017, Noel Jr., together with his fellow The Voice Kids alum and label mate Elha Nympha, released a cover duet of John Legend and Ariana Grande's "Beauty and the Beast" produced by MCA Music Inc. In August 2017, he released a cover of "The Show" by Lenka. at the age of 12, Noel Jr. was awarded the Best Actor Award at the Cinemalaya 2017 for his performance in the independent Filipino film Kiko Boksingero.

He was cast as "Jeremy Potts" in the Manila production of Ian Fleming's "Chitty Chitty Bang Bang" at the Newport Performing Arts Theater in Resorts World Manila which opened October 27, 2017. In 2021, Noel is now on TV5 for his new and also his first acting teleserye drama series, "Nina Niño," with co-stars Teleserye "Primetime Majesty" Maja Salvador, and Empoy Marquez. He also starred in the Thriller "Tenement 66," with co-stars Francine Diaz and Francis Magundayao.

== Filmography ==
=== Film ===
| Year | Title | Role | Ref. |
|---|---|---|---|
| 2013 | Bingoleras | | |
| 2014 | 2nd Best | | |
| 2016 | This Time | Young Coby Martinez | |
| 2016 | Ang Tatay Kong Sexy | | |
| 2017 | Kiko Boksingero | | |
| 2018 | Rainbow's Sunset | Rufus | |
| 2019 | The Last Interview: The Mayor Antonio Halili Story | Young Antonio Halili | |
| 2019 | Children of the River | Elias | |
| 2019 | Damaso | Basilio | |
| 2019 | Gitarista | Young Marcelo | |
| 2020 | Death of Nintendo | Paolo | |
| 2021 | Tenement 66 | Ron-Ron | |
| 2021 | Versus | Nico | |
| 2024 | Boys at the Back | Kevin | |
| 2024 | Fruitcake | Jagson | |
| 2025 | Song of the Fireflies | Herbert | |

=== Television ===
| Year | Title | Role | Ref. |
|---|---|---|---|
| 2012 | Pinoy Big Brother: Teen Edition 4 | One of 5 Pinoy Big Bulilits | |
| 2014 | Umagang Kay Ganda | Bulilit Host | |
| 2015 | Wansapanataym: I Heart Kuryente Kid | Erickson | |
| 2016 | The Voice Kids (season 3) | Himself / Contestant | |
| 2017–2018 | Team Yey! (season 2) | Himself / Sound Check host | |
| 2017 | ASAP | Guest performer | |
| 2017 | Maalaala Mo Kaya: Tubuhan | Young Noven Belleza | |
| 2017 | Maalaala Mo Kaya: Tape Recorder | Young Allan | |
| 2017 | Tabi Po | Pedrito | |
| 2018 | Ipaglaban Mo: Angkin | Atong | |
| 2018 | The Good Son | Young Anthony | |
| 2018 | Your Face Sounds Familiar Kids (season 2) | Contestant / Performer | |
| 2019 | Dok Ricky, Pedia | Willy | |
| 2019 | Project Feb 14 | Young Cody | |
| 2019 | Maalaala Mo Kaya: Youth Center | Estong | |
| 2019 | Parasite Island | Young Gary | |
| 2019 | I Am U | Young Tristan | |
| 2021–2022 | Niña Niño | Niño | |
| 2023 | Drag You and Me | Richie | |
| 2024 | Ang Himala ni Niño | Niño | |
| 2025 | Incognito | Luis | |
| 2025 | It's Okay to Not Be Okay | Young Matmat | |
| 2025–2026 | The Alibi | Young Walter Cunanan | |

=== Music Videos ===
| Year | Title | Role | Ref. |
|---|---|---|---|
| 2015 | "Sa Piling Mo" by Silent Sanctuary | Guest Artist | |
| 2017 | The Show | Main Role | |
| 2017 | Beauty and the Beast Cover with Elha Nympha | Main Role | |
| 2019 | "Dito sa Barangay 143" by Gloc-9 | Guest Artist | |

== Stage credits ==
| Year(s) | Production | Role | Director | Theater/Company |
|---|---|---|---|---|
| 2011, 2012 | "Hansel and Gretel" | Ensemble | Luigi Nacario | Lucky Chinatown Atrium Eastwood Mall Alphaland Southgate Mall Star Theater and St. Cecilia's Hall – KAPI |
| 2012–2013 | "Peter Pan, A Musical Adventure in Neverland" | Michael | Luigi Nacario | Star Theater, Pasig & Alabang – KAPI |
| 2012, 2013, 2014, 2015 | "Jack and the Beanstalk" | Jack/Giant | Luigi Nacario | Venice Piazza, SM Southmall, Alphaland Southgate Mall CCP Tanghalang Huseng Batute Star Theater – KAPI (Giant) |
| 2013 | "Cinderella" | Kid Ensemble | Michael Stuart Williams | Resorts World Manila |
| 2013, 2014 | "Munting Saranggola" | Jun–Jun | Melvin Lee | PETA Theater; & PCMC Grounds – PETA |
| 2013, 2014 | "Wizard of Oz" | Wizard | Luigi Nacario | Star Theater – Alphaland Southgate Mall & CCP Tanghalang Huse Batute |
| 2013, 2015 | "Hua Mulan" | Mulan's Brother | Luigi Nacario | Alphaland Southgate Mall SM Southmall Venice Piazza Lucky Chinatown Atrium Star Theater – KAPI |
| 2013,2014, 2015 | "Alice in Wonderland" | Mr. Rabbit/ Ensemble | Luigi Nacario | St. Cecilia's Hall, St. Scholastica's College, MNL Eastwood Mall, CCP Tanghalang Huse Batute Alphaland Southgate Mall & Star Theater – KAPI (Ensemble) |
| 2013,2014, 2015 | "Rated: PG" | Tonton | Mae Quesada-Medina | PETA Theater; Valenzuela and Cainta, Rizal – PETA |
| 2014 | "Aladdin and the Magic Lamp" | Genie of the Lamp | Luigi Nacario | Star Theater – KAPI |
| 2014 | "Pinocchio" | Pinocchio | Joy Virata | Onstage, Greenbelt 1, Makati City – Repertory Philippines |
| 2014 | "Scrooge" | Young Ebenezer Scrooge/Urchin | Baby Barredo | Onstage, Greenbelt 1, Makati City – Repertory Philippines |
| 2014 | "Hansel and Gretel" | Hansel | Luigi Nacario | SM Fairview |
| 2015 | "Beauty and the Beast" | Brother of Beauty | Luigi Nacario | Lucky Chinatown Mall and Eastwood Mall – KAPI |
| 2015 | "Snow White and the Seven Dwarfs" | Mosquito/Fred | Joy Virata | Onstage, Greenbelt 1, Makati City – Repertory Philippines |
| 2015 | "The Secret Garden" | Colin Craven | Anton Juan | Onstage, Greenbelt 1, Makati City- Repertory Philippines |
| 2015 | "Prinsipe Munti" | Munti | Tuxqs Rutaquio | CCP Tanghalang Huseng Batute, Pasay Assumpta Theater, Assumption College, Antipolo City Teatrino, Greenhills, San Juan City – Tanghalang Pilipino |
| 2016 | "Awitin Mo at Isasayaw Ko" | Lito | Paul Alexander Morales | CCP Main Theater, Tanghalang Nicanor Abelardo – Ballet Philippines |
| 2016, 2017 | "Pinocchio" | Pinocchio | Luigi Nacario | Globe Auditorium St.Cecilia's Hall, St. Scholastica's College CCP Pasinaya, Tanghalang Huseng Batute – KAPI |
| 2016, 2017 | "Fun Home" | John Bechdel | Bobby Garcia | Carlos P. Romulo Auditorium, RCBC Plaza, Makati City – Atlantis Theatrical |
| 2016, 2017 | "Tagu-Taguan, Nasaan Ang Buwan" | Jepoy/Popoy | Melvin Lee/ Dudz Terana | PETA Theater/Star Theater – PETA |
| 2017 | "Noli Me Tangere The Opera Manila" | Basilio | Jerry Sibal | CCP Main Theater, Tanghalang Nicanor Abelardo, Pasay – J&S Productions |
| 2017 | "Peter Pan" | Peter Pan | Luigi Nacario | CCP Pasinaya, Tanghalang Huseng Batute – KAPI |
| 2017 | "Cinderella" | Ensemble | Luigi Nacario | Globe Auditorium, BGC, Taguig – KAPI |
| 2017 | "Chitty Chitty Bang Bang" | Jeremy Potts | Jaime del Mundo | NPAT, Resorts World Manila – Full House Productions |
| 2017 | "Ang Buhay ni Galileo" | Young Andrea/ Narrator | Rody Vera | Rajah Sulayman Theater – PETA |
| 2018 | "Chitty Chitty Bang Bang" | Jeremy Potts | Jaime del Mundo | NPAT, Resorts World Manila – Full House Productions |
| 2018 | "Ang Buhay ni Galileo" | Young Andrea/ Narrator | Rody Vera | PETA Theater – PETA |
| 2019 | "Noli Me Tangere The Opera Manila" | Basilio | Jerry Sibal | CCP Main Theater, Tanghalang Nicanor Abelardo, Pasay – J&S Productions |
| 2019 | "Love Does Not Hurt: Sining Aruga Para sa Pamilyang Valenzuelano" | Host | PETA | Valenzuela Amphitheater and City Hall Park |
| 2019 | "Love Does Not Hurt" | Host | PETA | Quezon City Memorial Circle |
| 2019 | "Sino’ng Bayani" | Diego | Maribel Legarda | National Museum of Natural History, Manila - PETA |
| 2020 | "Tabing-Ilog The Musical" | Sammy | Topper Fabregas | Dolphy Theater, ABS-CBN Compound, Mo. Ignacia, Quezon City – Teatro Kapamilya |
| 2020 | "Blackpink" | Bunso | Tyrone Casumpang | Online Platform-CCP FB Page, VLF FB Page & Vimeo - Virgin Labfest 2020 |
| 2020 | ”Lola Doc” | Noel | Layeta Bucoy-Writer | Online Platform - Tanghalang Pilipino FB Page & YouTube Channel - Tanghalang Pilipino |
| 2020 | ”Gabay Guro” | Noel | Dexter M. Santos | Online Platform - Gabay Guro FB Page & YouTube Channel - PLDT Home |
| 2020 | ”Gabay Kalikasan” | Noel | Dexter M. Santos | Online Platform - Gabay Kalikasan FB Page & YouTube Channel - PLDT Home |
| 2022 | "Bayang Pinapangarap" | Noel | Floy Quintos | The Metropolitan Theater, Manila |
| 2023 | "Halimaw" | Alberto | Raffy Tejada | Teresa Yuchengco Auditorium, DLSU, Taft, Manila - DLSU Harlequin Theater Guild |
| 2023 | "Silver Lining" | Young Anton | Maribel Legarda | Carlos P. Romulo Auditorium, RCBC Plaza, Makati - Rockitwell Studios & MusicArtes Inc. |
| 2024 | "Buruguduystunstugudunstuy" | Tikmol | Dexter Santos | Newport Performing Arts Theater - Full House Productions |
| 2024 | "Jepoy and the Magic Circle" | Jepoy | Joy Virata | REP Eastwood Theater - Repertory Philippines |
| 2025 | "Romeo & Juliet" | Romeo | Meldrig Costuna | St. Cecilia’s Hall, St. Scholastica’s College - KAPI |
| 2026 | "Bagets The Musical" | Gilbert | Maribel Legarda | Newport Performing Arts Theater - PETA/Viva/Philstar |

== Discography ==
=== Singles ===
| Year | Song | Label |
|---|---|---|
| 2017 | Alaalarawan | MCA Music Inc. |
| 2017 | The Show | MCA Music Inc. |
| 2017 | Parating na ang Pasko | MCA Music Inc. |
| 2017 | Laman Ng Isip | Universal Records (Philippines) |

== Accolades ==
| Year | Award | Category | Work | Result |
|---|---|---|---|---|
| 2014 | 27th Aliw Awards | Best Child Performer | KAPI's Hua Mulan | Won |
| 2016 | 2015 Philstage Gawad Buhay! | Male Featured Performance in a Musical | Repertory Philippines’ Secret Garden | Cited |
| 2016 | 2015 Philstage Gawad Buhay! | Outstanding Male Lead Performance in a Musical | Tanghalang Pilipino's Prinsipe Munti | Nominated |
| 2016 | 29th Aliw Awards | Best Child Performer | Repertory Philippines’ Secret Garden | Won |
| 2017 | 2016 Philstage Gawad Buhay! | Male Featured Performance in a Musical | Ballet Philippines’ Awitin Mo at Isasayaw Ko | Cited |
| 2017 | Cinemalaya 2017 | Best Actor | Kiko Boksingero | Won |
| 2017 | 30th ALIW Awards | Best Child Performer | Atlantis Productions' Fun Home | Won |
| 2018 | The 2017 BroadwayWorld Regional Award | Best Actor (Musical) | PETA's Tagu-Taguan, Nasaan Ang Buwan? | Won |
| 2018 | 34th PMPC Star Awards For Movies | Movie Child Performer of the Year | Kiko Boksingero | Nominated |
| 2018 | 2017 Philstage Gawad Buhay! | Male Featured Performance in a Play | PETA's Ang Buhay ni Galileo | Nominated |
| 2018 | FAMAS 2018 | Best Actor | Kiko Boksingero | Nominated |
| 2018 | GAWAD URIAN 2018 | Best Actor | Kiko Boksingero | Nominated |
| 2018 | Awit Awards 2018 | Best Song Written for Movie/TV/Stage play | Alaalarawan (Kiko Boksingero) | Nominated |
| 2018 | Young Critics Circle | Best Performance | Kiko Boksingero | Nominated |
| 2018 | Urduja Film Festival 2018 | Best Young Actor | Kiko Boksingero | Won |
| 2018 | 31st Aliw Awards | Hall of Fame Awardee | Best Child Performer | Won |
| 2019 | 35th PMPC Star Awards for Movies | Best Child Performer | Rainbow's Sunset | Nominated |
| 2021 | YCC Film Desk's 31st Annual Circle Citations for Distinguished Achievement in Film for 2020 | Best Performance (ensemble) | Death of Nintendo | Won |
| 2021 | International Film Festival Manhattan | Jury Award Best Ensemble in Acting | Gitarista | Won |
| 2022 | FDCP Film Ambassadors' Night (FAN) Award | Film Ambassador (Actor) | Gitarista (Guitarist) | Honoree |
| 2022 | Gawad Pasado 2022 | Pinakapasadong Katuwang na Aktor 2021 | Tenement 66 | Nominated |
| 2023 | 36th Aliw Awards | Best Lead Actor in a Musical | DLSU Harlequin Theater Guild’s Halimaw | Nominated |
| 2023 | The 35th PMPC Star Awards for TV | Best Drama Actor | Niña Niño | Nominated |
| 2025 | Manila International Film Festival 2025 | Best Supporting Actor | Song of the Fireflies | Won |
