= Kiko Boksingero =

- Theatrical Movie Poster
- Directed by: Thop Nazareno
- Screenplay by: Denise O'Hara; Ash Malanum; Heber Justin O'Hara; Emmanuel Espejo Jr.
- Story by: Thop Nazareno
- Produced by: James Robin Mayo; Ferdinand Lapuz
- Starring: Noel Comia Jr.; Yayo Aguila; Yul Servo; Denise Soliva; William Buenavente; JM Canlas
- Cinematography: Marvin Reyes
- Edited by: Thop Nazareno
- Music by: Pepe Manikan
- Release date: August 5, 2017 (Cinemalaya)
- Country: Philippines
- Language: Filipino

Kiko Boksingero (lit. 'Kiko the Boxer') is a 2017 Philippine independent film starring Noel Comia Jr., and directed by Thop Nazareno. It won the awards for Best Actor (Noel Comia Jr.), Best Supporting Actress (Yayo Aguila), and Best Original Music Score (Pepe Manikan) at the 2017 Cinemalaya Film Festival.

== See also ==
- 13th Cinemalaya Independent Film Festival
- Respeto
