= Mikhail Red =

Filipino filmmaker

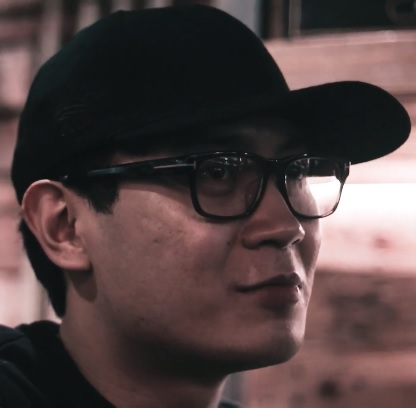
- Red in 2021
- Born: December 11, 1991 (age 34); Manila, Philippines
- Occupation: Filmmaker
- Years active: 2013–present
- Known for: Birdshot; Eerie; Dead Kids; Deleter
- Father: Raymond Red

Mikhail Red is a Filipino filmmaker and storyteller. He is best known for his films Birdshot (2016), Eerie (2019), and Dead Kids (2019), which was the first ever Netflix original film from the Philippines.

Red began directing in his early twenties. His work spans multiple genres, often incorporating elements of social commentary.

== Early life ==
Mikhail Red is the eldest son of Raymond Red, who won the Short Film Palme d'Or for his film Anino at the 2000 Cannes Film Festival. At the age of 15 Red studied filmmaking under Marilou Diaz-Abaya, and directed his first short film, called The Threshold. The film took Red to his first international film festival, in Germany. Several more short films would follow, such as Kamera, Harang, and Hazard, with Harang winning the Grand Prize at the Seoul International Youth Film Festival and Hazard winning the Special Jury Prize at the Cinemanila International Film Festival in 2010.

== Career ==
Since his childhood days, Red was a gamer and the role-playing games are reflected in the ethical dilemma of his characters.

Red was 21 years old when he directed his first feature film Rekorder, in 2013. The experimental film, about film piracy and voyeurism, took 13 days to shoot. After screening at Cinemalaya, the film won Red the Best New Director award at the 2014 Vancouver International Film Festival.

In 2016, Red directed the film Birdshot, a police procedural and coming-of-age drama. The film won Best Film in the Asian Future section at the 29th Tokyo International Film Festival. It was also the Philippines' submission for the Best Foreign Language Film at the 90th Academy Awards, and was the first Filipino film to be released worldwide by Netflix.

Red's first film with a major studio was the horror film Eerie, released in 2019. The film was an international co-production involving Star Cinema and Aurora Media of Singapore. The film starred Charo Santos-Concio and Bea Alonzo.

In 2019, Red directed the heist film Dead Kids which was the first Filipino Netflix original film. This was followed by the zombie film Block Z (2020), a return to mainstream filmmaking and Star Cinema.

In 2021, Red directed Arisaka, a revenge Western film produced by Ten17P. He also completed production on the third season of the HBO series Halfworlds.

== Prospective projects ==
Red has a number of films planned or in development. He has been developing The Grandstand, a hostage drama based on the Manila hostage crisis written by Ricky Lee and to be produced by Globe Studios. He also plans to direct a science-fiction film called Quantum Suicide which will be co-produced with Japan; he has stated he wants Daniel Padilla to star in the film.

Red is also planning to direct a prequel to Eerie titled Eerie Zero and a remake of Magic Temple (1996), both for Star Cinema. He also has a thriller planned, to be written by his brother Nikolas Red and set during the pandemic, his first film for Viva Films. Other projects that Red has mentioned include a film about the Black Dahlia serial killer (which has been greenlit after being in development for four years), a Star Cinema hacker-heist film featuring a young cast, and a period horror film.

On February 1, 2023, Variety announced that Red is set to be the series director of "Dreamwalker", a live-action book-to-series adaptation of a story about a monster-slaying vlogger. The series is based on the graphic novel by Mikey Sutton and Noel Layon Flores, and is also set to have Kate Valdez in the lead role.

== Filmography ==
=== Film ===
Table featuring feature films directed by Mikhail Red
Year	Title	Director	Writer	Editor	Ref.
2013	Rekorder	Yes	Yes	Yes	
2016	Birdshot	Yes	Yes	Yes	
2017	Neomanila	Yes	Yes	Yes	
2019	Eerie	Yes	Yes	No	
2019	Dead Kids	Yes	No	No	
2020	Block Z	Yes	No	No	
2021	Arisaka	Yes	No	No	
2022	Deleter	Yes	Yes	No	
2024	Friendly Fire	Yes	No	No	
2024	Nokturno	Yes	No	No	
2025	Lilim	Yes	No	No	
2027	Remote	Yes	TBA	TBA	

=== Television ===
Year	Title	Role	Network
2021	Halfworlds	Director (season 3)	HBO Asia
2024	Dreamwalker	Director	
