= Chai Fonacier =

Filipina actress, singer, writer and songwriter

- Born: September 27, 1986 (age 39); Cagayan de Oro, Philippines
- Occupations: Actress, writer, singer, songwriter
- Years active: 2006–present

Chai Fonacier (born September 27, 1986) is a Filipino actress, singer and songwriter.

== Career ==
=== Music ===
Fonacier was a contestant of the first season of Pinoy Dream Academy. She was also a part of the defunct Cebu-based trip hop trio Womb with Anthony Uy and Fender Figuera.

=== Acting ===
Fonacier won her first Best Supporting Actress award in the 11th Sinulog Film Festival for her performance in Ara Chawdhury's short film Operation Prutas in 2015. Later in the same year, she appeared in the Cinema One Originals Digital Film Festival entry Miss Bulalacao and won the Best Supporting Actress award.

In 2016, Fonacier appeared in the film Pauwi Na. For her performance in Patay na si Hesus, Fonacier was awarded Best Supporting Actress in the 35th Luna Awards.

In 2018, Fonacier appeared in the film Asuang. She also appeared in Halik and Wansapanataym's Switch be with You miniseries, both running from 2018 to 2019.

In 2019, she appeared in the films Born Beautiful and Sakaling Maging Tayo. Later in the same year, she would reprise her role in the TV adaptation of Born Beautiful.

== Personal life ==
When speaking of her acting role portraying a trans man, Fonacier stated she identifies as cisgender and mostly straight, so she talked to her LGBTQ++ friends about their experiences to prepare for the role and to perform it with sensitivity.

She speaks English, Cebuano, Tagalog, and Hiligaynon.

== Filmography ==
=== Television ===
| Year | Title | Role | Notes | Source |
|---|---|---|---|---|
| 2006 | Pinoy Dream Academy | Herself — Contestant | Season 1 | |
| 2018–2019 | Halik | Chari Ortiz | | |
| 2018–2019 | Wansapanataym | Upeng Atay-atayan | Miniseries: "Switch be with You" | |
| 2019 | Born Beautiful | Percival | Episode: "Tarantulala Sa'yo" | |
| 2019 | Ipaglaban Mo! | Gina | Episode: "Paninira" | |
| 2021–2022 | FPJ's Ang Probinsyano | Cheche | Season 9 | |
| 2022–2023 | Maria Clara at Ibarra | Lucia | | |
| 2024 | Lilet Matias: Attorney-at-Law | Rosanna Dacanay | | |
| 2025 | Lolong: Bayani ng Bayan | Mercy | | |
| 2025 | Beauty Empire | Kriselda Hoffman / Teresa Banuag / Marie Armani | | |
| TBA | The Bagman | | | |

=== Film ===
| Year | Title | Role | Notes | Source |
|---|---|---|---|---|
| 2015 | Operation Prutas | | Short film | |
| 2015 | Miss Bulalacao | | | |
| 2017 | Patay na si Hesus | Judith "Jude" Marie | | |
| 2017 | Respeto | Betchai | | |
| 2018 | Asuang | | | |
| 2019 | Sakaling Maging Tayo | Ernaline Marie "Erna" Alindogan | | |
| 2019 | Born Beautiful | Yumi | | |
| 2022 | Nocebo | Diana | Filipino-Irish film | |
| 2024 | A Thousand Forests | Crystal Flores | Independent film | |
| 2025 | Song of the Fireflies | | | |

== Awards and nominations ==
| Year | Work | Award | Category | Result | Source |
|---|---|---|---|---|---|
| 2015 | Operation Prutas | Sinulog Film Festival | Best Supporting Actress | Won | |
| 2015 | Miss Bulalacao | Cinema One Originals Film Festival | Best Supporting Actress | Won | |
| 2017 | Patay na si Hesus | PMPC Star Awards for Movies | Movie Supporting Actress of the Year | Nominated | |
| 2017 | Patay na si Hesus | Young Critics Circle Awards | Best Performance by Male or Female, Adult or Child, Individual or Ensemble in Leading or Supporting Role (Note: Shared with the cast of Patay na si Hesus.) | Nominated | |
| 2017 | Patay na si Hesus | Luna Awards | Best Supporting Actress | Won | |
| 2018 | "Kun Di Pa Lang Ko Buang" | Cebu Siloy Music Awards | Best Vocal Performance — Female | Nominated | |
| 2018 | Respeto | PMPC Star Awards for Movies | Movie Supporting Actress of the Year | Nominated | |
| 2018 | Respeto | Gawad Urian Awards | Best Supporting Actress | Nominated | |
| 2018 | Respeto | FAMAS Awards | Best Supporting Actress | Nominated | |
| 2018 | Asuang | Cinema One Originals Film Festival | Best Supporting Actress | Nominated | |
