= Ang Larawan =

- Official theatrical release poster
- Directed by: Loy Arcenas
- Screenplay by: Rolando Tinio
- Based on: Larawan (1997 play) by Nick Joaquin
- Produced by: Girlie Rodis; Celeste Legaspi
- Starring: Joanna Ampil; Rachel Alejandro; Paulo Avelino
- Cinematography: Boy Yñiguez
- Edited by: Lawrence Fajardo
- Music by: Ryan Cayabyab
- Production company: Culturtain Musicat Productions
- Distributed by: Solar Pictures
- Release dates: October 30, 2017 (Tokyo); December 25, 2017 (Philippines)
- Running time: 124 minutes
- Country: Philippines
- Language: Filipino
- Budget: ₱25 million
- Box office: ₱29 million

Ang Larawan, internationally released as The Portrait, is a 2017 Philippine musical film directed by Loy Arcenas.

Based on the 1997 stage play Larawan, which in turn was based on the 1950 literary play A Portrait of the Artist as Filipino by National Artist Nick Joaquin, the film takes place in 1941 just before World War II in a mansion in Manila.

Ang Larawan had its premiere in Japan on October 30, 2017, as part of the 30th Tokyo International Film Festival. It was commercially released in the Philippines on December 25, 2017, as an entry to the 43rd Metro Manila Film Festival, where it won five of its twelve categories, including Best Picture, Best Musical Score, Best Production Design, and the Gatpuno Antonio J. Villegas Cultural Award and Best Actress given to Joana Ampil. Critical response for the film was mostly positive.

== Cast ==
The cast of Ang Larawan includes:

- Joanna Ampil as Candida Marasigan
- Rachel Alejandro as Paula Marasigan
- Paulo Avelino as Tony Javier
- Sandino Martin as Bitoy Camacho
- Cris Villonco as Susan
- Aicelle Santos as Violet
- Nonie Buencamino as Manolo
- Menchu Lauchengco-Yulo as Pepang
- Robert Arevalo as Don Perico
- Celeste Legaspi as Doña Loleng
- Zsa Zsa Padilla as Elsa Montes
- Cara Manglapus as Patsy
- Rayver Cruz as Charlie Dacanay
- Ogie Alcasid as Pulis Tinio
- Jojit Lorenzo as Pulis Bernal
- Dulce as Doña Upeng
- Nanette Inventor as Doña Irene
- Jaime Fabregas as Don Aristeo
- Bernardo Bernardo as Don Alvaro
- Noel Trinidad as Don Miguel
- Leo Rialp as Don Lorenzo Marasigan

Ricky Davao, Mikee Cojuangco, Martin del Rosario, as well as Ryan Cayabyab and his wife and son all made cameo appearances in the film.

== Production ==
=== Development ===
==== Background ====
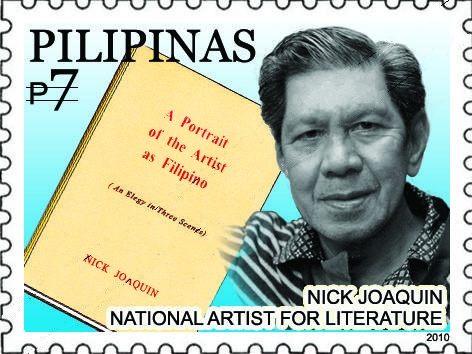
The film was adapted on a play written by Nick Joaquin.

The film is based on the 1997 stage play Larawan, which had its 1998 restaging written by Nick Joaquin, a recognized National Artist for Literature which in turn was also an adaption of an earlier play A Portrait of the Artist as Filipino, which was also by Joaquin. The film is the third full-length feature film to be directed by Loy Arcenas, a former Broadway production designer.

The film is produced by Culturtain Musicat Productions which is owned by talent manager Girlie Rodis and singer-actress Celeste Legaspi who were also producers of the film.

Rodis aims to present the film as an "alternative" to romance comedy and horror films prevailing in Philippine mainstream cinema but clarified she does not want to "compete" with other local film production companies. She recalled a man in SM Cinema telling her there was a lack of local films suitable for school educational viewings which led her to come up with an "alternative" film.

==== Financing ====
The production budget has been described as expensive, with producer Rodis partly responsible for the financing. The National Commission for Culture and the Arts (NCCA), the Quezon City Film Fund, Resorts World Manila, the Film Development Council of the Philippines, as well as individual sponsors were among the financiers of the film. The budget of the film was ₱25 million which took a year to raise. Ang Larawan also received endorsements from the Commission on Higher Education and the NCCA.

=== Filming ===
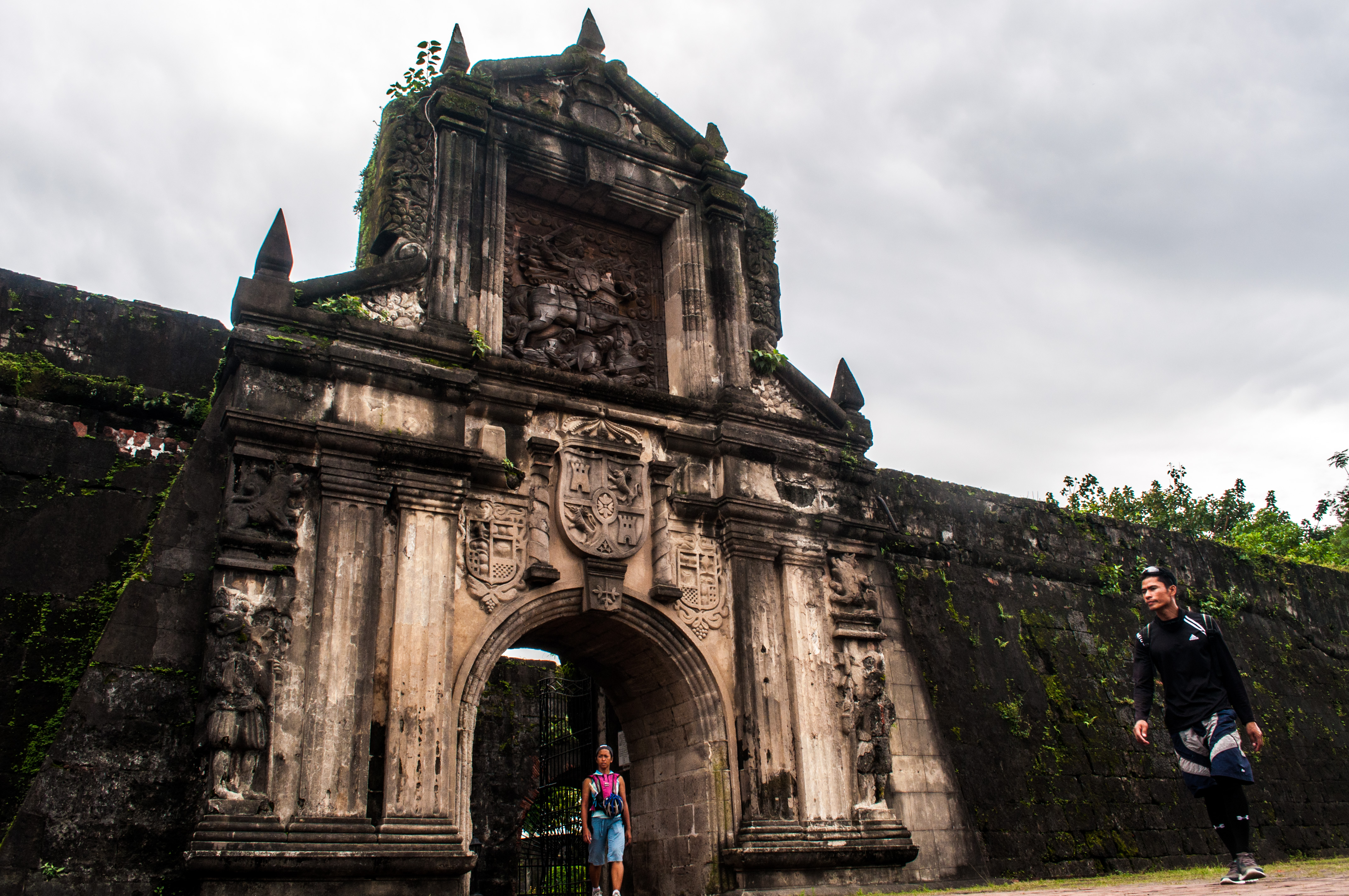
Filming on Ang Larawan commenced in Intramuros itself but scenes set in the walled area were later filmed in Taal, Batangas.

Principal photography on Ang Larawan began in June 2015, with Boy Yñiguez as cinematographer. It officially began in Intramuros, Manila for the La Naval procession scene, where 600 costumed extras were involved. Filming with the cast occurred in Taal, Batangas and lasted 11 days, particularly in the Villavicencio ancestral home, which served as the ancestral home of the protagonists' family in Intramuros. Gino Gonzales supervised the production design. While the music and song performances were mostly prerecorded, the dialogues were recorded live.

=== Music ===
The libretto used in the film was by deceased National Artist for Theater and Literature Rolando Tinio while the ABS-CBN Philharmonic Orchestra rendered National Artist for Music Ryan Cayabyab's music which was used for the film. Cayabyab is the musical director. Nick Joaquin has described Tinio's libretto style as "Tinio’s Manila Tagalog".

One of Arcenas' key direction of the film is to treat the film's songs as dialogue remarking that the songs are "not set pieces" and "they have to blend with the text". Many rehearsals were done were the acting members of the cast had to practice delivering both speaking lines and singing songs. The production team decided to make the Ang Larawan as a musical film instead of a traditional play so it would be more acceptable to a younger audience and a musical setup would allow for "funny and light moments". All song performances in the film were prerecorded except for a single solo performance by Joanna Ampil as her character, Candida in "Act One".

== Release ==
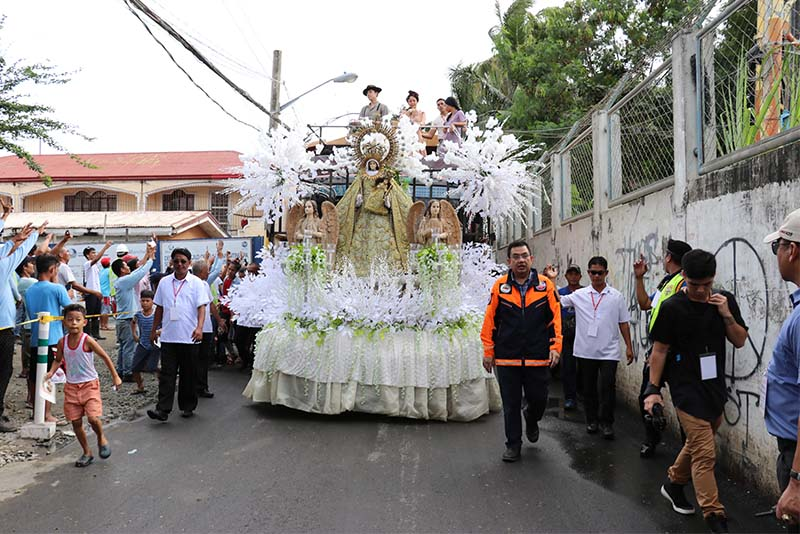
Float of Ang Larawan at the MMFF Parade of the Stars

Ang Larawan was first released in Japan in 2017 as part of the 30th Tokyo International Film Festival (TIFF) under the title, The Portrait (ある肖像画, Aru Shōzō-ga). The film's TIFF release was in Filipino and Part Color and had a duration of 120 minutes. The film was screened from October 30–31, 2017 at the TOHO Cinemas in Roponggi Hills. It was one of the ten nominated films which vied for the Asian Future Film award.

The film had its Philippine theatrical release as one of the eight entries of the 2017 Metro Manila Film Festival which began on December 25, 2017. Ang Larawan was announced as an entry to the film festival in November 2017 with three other films. According to the MMFF organizers, after the producers learned about the first day sales, they decided to come up with an agreement with select mall owners to pull out Ang Larawan from select cinemas the producers deemed that have a limited market. They agreed to bring back the film in those selected cinemas on January 1, 2018.

== Reception ==
=== Box office ===
During the official run of the 2017 Metro Manila Film Festival, Ang Larawan garnered a total of ₱29 million box office gross, and was ranked seventh among eight film entries in terms of sale.

=== Critical response ===
Ang Larawan drew very positive reactions from critics. Richard Kuipers, a film critic writing for Variety described the film as "beautifully decorated and top-notch in every technical detail" and added that it was "clearly made with the utmost love and care". Kuipers also praised the performance of Joanna Ampil and Rachel Alejandro as sisters Candida and Paula. The critic also remarked that Roland Tinio's lyrics and Ryan Cayabyab's musical direction created a "highly effective atmosphere of doom, gloom and family turmoil before offering a ray of light".

Tristan Zinampan of Screen Anarchy commented that "The meticulousness of 'Ang Larawan'’s crafting is in itself is an act of love. Performances, production design, and, of course, the music carries this affection as all the above mentioned bring their A-game on screen. They go above and beyond the required, and you can’t help but admire the grandeur exhibited." Oggs Cruz of Rappler said that "the film is a gorgeous pageant of taste and manner. What it lacks in subtlety in its garish sentimentality for a foregone age, it makes up for generosity and vivid earnestness." Fred Hawson, whose review was republished in ABS-CBN News, praised its visuals and music, stating that "the technical aspects of this film -- lush cinematography (with those tight closeups) by Boy Yniguez, meticulous period production design by Gino Gonzales, and of course, the rousing musical score by Ryan Cayabyab -- definitely stand out and deserve award recognition." Broadway World's Oliver Oliveros praised Ampil and Alejandro's performances, saying that they "make a pair of complementing heroines whose life choices--whether they're right or wrong--and their instinctive spoken lines and impassioned singing keep you in the palm of their hands in the film's entirety--they both keep the movie moving and authentic." Members of the Cinema Evaluation Board unanimously gave the film an "A" rating.

=== Accolades ===
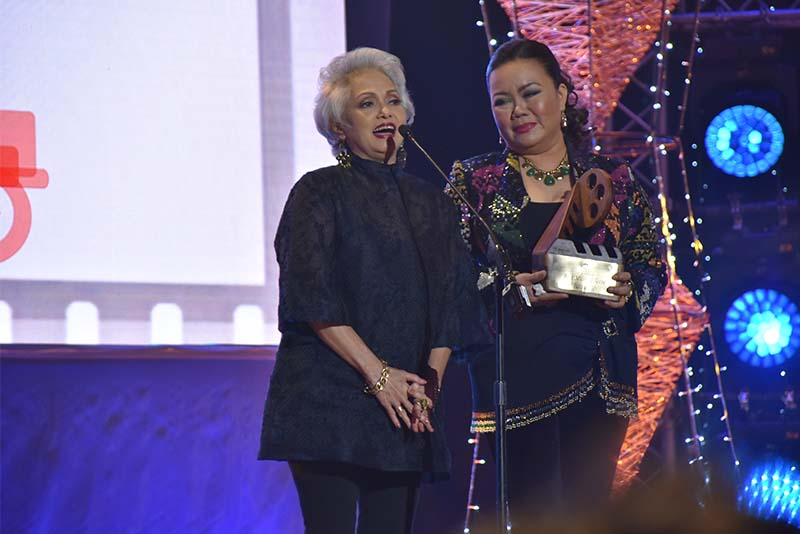
Celeste Legaspi and Dulce claim the Special Jury Prize

The Gabi ng Parangal (transl. Awarding Night) of the 2017 Metro Manila Film Festival was held on December 27, 2017, at the Kia Theatre in Quezon City. 'Ang Larawan' earned a total of five awards, including Best Picture.

List of accolades
Award / film festival	Category	Recipient(s)	Result
2017 Metro Manila Film Festival
2017 Metro Manila Film Festival	Best Picture	Ang Larawan	Won
2017 Metro Manila Film Festival	Gatpuno Antonio J. Villegas Cultural Award	Ang Larawan	Won
2017 Metro Manila Film Festival	Best Director	Loy Arcenas	Nominated
2017 Metro Manila Film Festival	Best Actress in a Leading Role	Joanna Ampil	Won
2017 Metro Manila Film Festival	Best Actress in a Supporting Role	Rachel Alejandro	Nominated
2017 Metro Manila Film Festival	Best Actress in a Supporting Role	Menchu Lauchengco	Nominated
2017 Metro Manila Film Festival	Best Actor in a Supporting Role	Robert Arevalo	Nominated
2017 Metro Manila Film Festival	Best Actor in a Supporting Role	Nonie Buencamino	Nominated
2017 Metro Manila Film Festival	Best Actor in a Supporting Role	Sandino Martin	Nominated
2017 Metro Manila Film Festival	Special Jury Prize	Nick Joaquin tied with Coco Martin of Ang Panday	Won
2017 Metro Manila Film Festival	Best Musical Score	Ang Larawan	Won
2017 Metro Manila Film Festival	Best Production Design	Ang Larawan	Won
