= Respeto =

2017 Philippine independent film

- Theatrical release poster
- English: Respect
- Directed by: Treb Monteras
- Written by: Treb Monteras; Njel de Mesa
- Produced by: Monster Jimenez
- Starring: Abra; Dido de la Paz; Loonie; Chai Fonacier; Ybes Bagadiong; Brian Arda; Thea Yrastorza; Kate Alejandrino; Nor Domingo
- Cinematography: Ike Avellana
- Edited by: Lawrence S. Ang
- Music by: Jay Durias
- Release date: August 4, 2017 (Cinemalaya)
- Running time: 80 minutes
- Country: Philippines
- Language: Filipino

Respeto (Respect) is a 2017 Philippine drama independent film starring Filipino hip hop artist Abra, and directed by Alberto "Treb" Monteras II. It was co-written by Monteras and screenwriter Njel de Mesa, who drew inspiration from the works of veteran poets such as Vim Nadera and National Artists Bienvenido Lumbera and Virgilio Almario.

The final film features a guest cameo appearance by poet Vim Nadera. Aside from Abra and de la Paz, the film cats includes Chai Fonacier, Ybes Bagadiong, Brian Arda, Thea Yrastorza, Kate Alejandrino, Nor Domingo and Filipino rapper Loonie.

== Plot ==
Hendrix is a poor aspiring rapper who wants to make a name for himself in the underground rap battle scene and gain respect in the community. After attempting to rob a second-hand bookstore in the neighborhood, he is discovered by the owner, Doc, an old poet with a haunted past as a dissident.

== Cast ==
- Abra as Hendrix
- Dido de la Paz as Fortunato "Doc" Reyes
- Loonie as Breezy G
- Chai Fonacier as Betchai
- Ybes Bagadiong as Payaso
- Brian Arda as Mando
- Thea Yrastorza as Connie
- Kate Alejandrino as Candy
- Nor Domingo as Fuentes

== Reception ==
It has received critical acclaim for its powerful use of the Filipino poetry in the form of Pinoy hip hop rap battles and Balagtasan poetry, the performance of veteran theater actor Dido de la Paz, and what film critic Philbert Dy calls its "rather powerful examination of a generational relationship with government-backed violence."

== Awards and nominations ==
The film won the awards for best feature-length film, Best Supporting Actor (Dido de la Paz), Best Editing, Best Cinematography, and Best Sound at the 2017 Cinemalaya Film Festival.

== See also ==
- Pinoy hip hop
- Abra (rapper)
- Balagtasan
- Kiko Boksingero
