= 2023 FAMAS Awards =

Annual Filipino film awards ceremony

71st FAMAS Awards
- Date: August 13, 2023
- Site: Manila Hotel, Manila
- Hosted by: Johann Enriquez; Gazini Ganados
- Directed by: Vince Tañada

Highlights
- Best Picture: Family Matters
- Most awards: Family Matters (4)
- Most nominations: Family Matters (12)

The 71st Filipino Academy of Movie Arts and Sciences (FAMAS) Awards took place on August 13, 2023, at the Manila Hotel in Manila and honored the best Filipino films released in 2022.

The nominations were announced on August 1 on FAMAS official Facebook page. The drama film Family Matters which premiered at the 2022 Metro Manila Film Festival received the most nominations with 12, including best picture, best director, best screenplay, and best cinematography. The film received the most awards with four, winning the Best Picture, Best Actor, Best Supporting Actress, and Best Editing. Nadine Lustre won her second Best Actress award after first winning the award in 2019.

== Winners and nominees ==
=== Awards ===
Winners are listed first, highlighted in boldface.

**Best Picture**: **Family Matters**; Blue Room; Deleter; La Traidora; Leonor Will Never Die	**Best Director**: **Ma-an Asuncion-Dagñalan – Blue Room**; Alejandro Ramos – La Traidora; Martika Escobar – Leonor Will Never Die; Mikhail Red – Deleter; Nuel Naval – Family Matters
**Best Actor**: **Noel Trinidad – Family Matters as Francisco Florencio**; Diego Loyzaga – Greed as Tomi; Ian Veneracion – Nanahimik ang Gabi as Chief; John Arcilla – Reroute as Gemo; Paulo Avelino – Ngayon Kaya as Harold Coquia	**Best Actress**: **Nadine Lustre – Greed as Kichi**; Heaven Peralejo – Nanahimik ang Gabi as Me-Ann; Janine Gutierrez – Ngayon Kaya as Amihan Fernandez; Liza Lorena – Family Matters as Eleonor Florencio; Sheila Francisco – Leonor Will Never Die as Leonor
**Best Supporting Actor**: **Sid Lucero – Reroute as Dan**; Nonie Buencamino – Family Matters as Francisco "Kiko" Jr.; Mon Confiado – Nanahimik ang Gabi as Soliman; Rocky Salumbides – Leonor Will Never Die as Ronwaldo; Soliman Cruz – Blue Room as Officer Delgado	**Best Supporting Actress**: **Nikki Valdez – Family Matters as Ellen**; Louise delos Reyes – Deleter as Aileen; Mylene Dizon – Family Matters as Fortune; Nour Hooshmand – Blue Room as Rocky; OJ Arci – La Traidora as Bubbles
**Best Screenplay**: **Abet Raz and Alejandro Ramos – La Traidora**; Ma-an Asuncion-Dagñalan – Blue Room; Martika Escobar – Leonor Will Never Die; Mel Mendoza Del Rosario – Family Matters; Nikolas Red and Mikhail Red – Deleter	**Best Cinematography**: **Neil Daza – Blue Room**; Carlos Mauricio – Leonor Will Never Die; Ian Alexander Guevara – Deleter; Joshua Reyes – Reroute; Noel Teehankee – Family Matters
**Best Production Design**: **Eero Yves Francisco – Leonor Will Never Die**; Elfren Vibar – Family Matters; James Rosendal – Greed; Law Fajardo – Reroute; Maolen Fadul – Blue Room	**Best Editing**: **Beng Bandong – Family Matters**; Law Fajardo – Reroute; Lawrence Ang – Leonor Will Never Die; Nikolas Red – Deleter; Vanessa De Leon – Blue Room
**Best Sound**: **Reroute**; Blue Room; Deleter; Leonor Will Never Die; Nanahimik ang Gabi	**Best Musical Score**: **Blue Room**; Deleter; Family Matters; Leonor Will Never Die; Ngayon Kaya
**Best Short Film**: **Golden Bells – Kurt Soberano**; Ang Mga Abo – Gabby Ramos; Dosena – Kyla Romero; Isa sa Isang Daan – Leia Reyna Pasumbal; Pasan – Marvin Cabas and John Paul Dabuet

=== Honors ===
- Fernando Poe Jr. Memorial Award – Lito Lapid
- Susan Roces Celebrity Award – Liza Lorena
- Dr. Jose R. Perez Memorial Award – Jun Urbano
- German Moreno Youth Achievement Award – Jillian Ward
- FAMAS Lifetime Achievement Award – Marita Zobel
- FAMAS Exemplary Award in Public Service – Martin Romualdez

=== Films with multiple nominations and awards ===
Films with multiple nominations
Nominations	Film
12	Family Matters
10	Blue Room
10	Leonor Will Never Die
8	Deleter
6	Reroute
4	La Traidora
4	Nanahimik Ang Gabi
3	Greed
3	Ngayon Kaya

Films with multiple wins
Wins	Film
4	Family Matters
3	Blue Room
2	Reroute
