= 39th PMPC Star Awards for Movies =

2024 Philippine Movie Press Club awards

39th Star Awards for Movies
- Date: November 24, 2024
- Hosted by: Gladys Reyes; Joee Guilas; Ara Mina
- Directed by: Vivian Poblete-Blancaflor
- Organized by: Philippine Movie Press Club (PMPC)

Highlights
- Best Picture: Tied between Family Matters and Mamasapano: Now It Can Be Told
- Most awards: Mamasapano: Now It Can Be Told (6)
- Most nominations: Family Matters (18)

The 39th PMPC Star Awards for Movies was an awards ceremony honoring outstanding achievements in Philippine cinema for films released in 2022. Organized by the Philippine Movie Press Club (PMPC) under the leadership of its president, Rodel Ocampo Fernando, the event took place on November 24, 2024, at the Winford Resort and Casino Manila. The ceremony occurred several months after the 40th PMPC Star Awards for Movies.

The program was hosted by Gladys Reyes, Joee Guilas, and Ara Mina. Family Matters and Mamasapano: Now It Can Be Told tied for Movie of the Year, while Broken Blooms received the award for Indie Movie of the Year.

== Winners and nominees ==
The following are the nominations for the 39th PMPC Star Awards for Movies, covering films released from January to December 2022.

Winners are listed first and indicated in bold.

=== Major categories ===
Movie of the Year (Mainstream)	Movie of the Year (Indie)
Winner: Tied between **Family Matters** (Cineko Productions and Top Story) and **Mamasapano: Now It Can Be Told** (Borracho Film Productions): Deleter (Viva Films); May–December-January (Viva Films); My Father, Myself (3:16 Media Network and Mentorque Productions); My Teacher (Ten17P and Tincan Productions); Nanahimik Ang Gabi (Rein Entertainment Productions)	Winner: **Broken Blooms** (BenTria Productions): 12 Weeks (Cinemalaya Foundation, Film Development Council of the Philippines, Digital Dreams); Bakit ‘Di Mo Sabihin? (Cinemalaya Foundation, Firestarters Productions, Viva Films); Blue Room (Cinemalaya Foundation, CreatePH Films, Eyepoppers Multiservices Services, Heaven's Best Entertainment); Doll House (Mavx Film Productions and Netflix Originals); Live Scream (The IdeaFirst Company, Powerhouse Media Capital, Viva Films); The Baseball Player (Cinemalaya Foundation, Rough Road Productions, Mavx Film Productions, Nokarin, Borj At Work Films)
Movie Director of the Year (Mainstream)	Movie Director of the Year (Indie)
Winner: Tied between **Nuel Crisostomo Naval** (Family Matters) and **Lester Dimaranan** (Mamasapano: Now It Can Be Told): Mac Alejandre (May–December-January); Joel Lamangan (My Father, Myself); Shugo Praico (Nanahimik Ang Gabi); Mikhail Red (Deleter); Paul Soriano (My Teacher)	Winner: **Louie Ignacio** (Broken Blooms): Marla Ancheta (Doll House); Ma-an Asuncion-Dagñalan (Blue Room); Real Florido (Bakit ‘Di Mo Sabihin?); Perci Intalan (Live Scream); Anna Isabelle Matutina (12 Weeks); Carlo Obispo (The Baseball Player)
Movie Actor of the Year	Movie Actress of the Year
Winner: **Baron Geisler** (Doll House): John Arcilla (Reroute); Elijah Canlas (Live Scream); John Lloyd Cruz (Kapag Wala Nang Mga Alon); Jeric Gonzales (Broken Blooms); Juan Karlos Labajo (Blue Room); Noel Trinidad (Family Matters)	Winner: **Nadine Lustre** (Deleter): Andrea Del Rosario (May–December-January); Max Eigenmann (12 Weeks); Janine Gutierrez (Bakit Hindi Mo Sabihin); Liza Lorena (Family Matters); Therese Malvar (Broken Blooms); Heaven Peralejo (Nanahimik Ang Gabi)
Movie Supporting Actor of the Year	Movie Supporting Actress of the Year
Winner: **Mon Confiado** (Nanahimik Ang Gabi): Harvey Bautista (Blue Room); Nonie Buencamino (Family Matters); Soliman Cruz (Blue Room); Paolo Gumabao (Mamasapano: Now It Can Be Told); Ronnie Lazaro (Kapag Wala Nang Mga Alon); JC Santos (Family Matters)	Winner: **Dimples Romana** (My Father Myself): Claudine Barretto (Mamasapano: Now it Can Be Told); Janice De Belen (Sugat Sa Dugo); Carmi Martin (My Teacher); Bing Pimentel (12 Weeks); Nikki Valdez (Family Matters); Phoebe Walker (Live Scream)
Movie Ensemble Acting of the Year	Indie Movie Ensemble Acting of the Year
Winner: Tied between **Family Matters** and **Mamasapano: Now It Can Be Told**: The Cast of Deleter; The Cast of Labyu With An Accent; The Cast of May–December-January; The Cast of My Father, Myself; The Cast of Nanahimik Ang Gabi	Winner: **Broken Blooms**: The Cast of 12 Weeks; The Cast of Bakit ‘Di Mo Sabihin?; The Cast of Blue Room; The Cast of Doll House; The Cast of Kapag Wala Nang Mga Alon; The Cast of Live Scream
New Movie Actor of the Year	New Movie Actress of the Year
Winner: **Khai Flores** (Sugat Sa Dugo): Tommy Alejandrino (The Baseball Player); Juan Calma (La Traidora); Aaron Concepcion (Call Me Papi); Keoni Jin (Blue Room); Ian Pangilinan (Family Matters); Itan Rosales (Showroom); Benz Sangalang (Sitio Diablo)	Winner: **Shira Tweg** (Sugat Sa Dugo): Christine Bermas (Relyebo); Angelica Cervantes (Kaliwaan); Tiffany Grey (My Father Myself); Robb Guinto (X-Deal 2); Christa Jocson (Sugat Sa Dugo); Ayanna Misola (Ang Babaeng Nawawala Sa Sarili); Angela Morena (Bata Pa Si Sabel)
Movie Child Performer of the Year
Winner: **Althea Ruedas** (Doll House): Shawn Nin̈o Gabriel (My Father, Myself); Elia Ilano (Deleter); Allyson McBride (Family Matters); Krystal Mejes (Family Matters); JM San Jose (The Baseball Player)

=== Technical categories ===
Movie Screenwriter of the Year	Movie Screenwriter of the Year (Indie)
Winner: **Eric Ramos** (Mamasapano: Now It Can Be Told): Quinn Carrillo (My Father Myself); Juvy Galamiton (My Teacher); Ricky Lee (May–December-January); Mel Mendoza-Del Rosario (Family Matters); Shugo Praico (Nanahimik ang Gabi); Patrick Valencia and Rodel Nacianceno (Labyu with an Accent)	Winner: **Ralston Jover** (Broken Blooms): Lav Diaz (Kapag Wala Nang mga Alon); Floriza Ferrer (Bakit ‘Di Mo Sabihin?); Siege Ledesma and Ma-an Asuncion-Dagñalan (Blue Room); Dominic Lim (Live Scream); Carlo Obispo (The Baseball Player); Onay Sales-Camero (Doll House)
Movie Cinematographer of the Year	Movie Cinematographer of the Year (Indie)
Winner: **Moises Zee** (Nanahimik Ang Gabi): Hermann Claravall (Labyu with an Accent); Ian Alexander Guevara (Deleter); Paolo Emmanuel Magsino (Mamasapano: Now It Can Be Told); TM Malones (My Father, Myself); Joshua Reyles (Reroute); Noel Teehankee (Family Matters)	Winner: **Neil Daza** (Blue Room): Lee Briones-Meily (Bakit ‘Di Mo Sabihin?); TM Malones (Broken Blooms); Larry Manda (Kapag Wala Nang mga Alon); Tom Redoble (Doll House); Marvin Reyes (The Baseball Player); Moises Zee (Live Scream)
Movie Production Designer of the Year	Movie Production Designer of the Year (Indie)
Winner: **Ericson Navarro** (Mamasapano: Now It Can Be Told): Marielle Hizon (Nanahimik ang Gabi); Gie Shock Jose (Deleter); Dante Mendoza (Bahay Na Pula); Shari Marie Montiague (Labyu with an Accent); Ericson Navarro (May–December-January); Elfren Vibar (Family Matters)	Winner: **Carmela Danao** (Live Scream): Michael Bayot (The Baseball Player); Jay Custodio (Broken Blooms); Lav Diaz (Kapag Wala Nang mga Alon); Marxie Maolen Fadul (Blue Room); Eero Yves Francisco (Leonor Will Never Die); Eric Manalo (Doll House)
Movie Editor of the Year	Movie Editor of the Year (Indie)
Winner: **Moises Zee** (Nanahimik Ang Gabi): Beng Bandong (Family Matters); Benjo Ferrer (May–December-January); Paolo Emmanuel Magsino (Mamasapano: Now It Can Be Told); Gilbert Obispo (My Father, Myself); Nikolas Red (Deleter); Mark Victor (My Teacher)	Winner: **Lawrence Ang** (Live Scream): Vanessa De Leon (Blue Room); Zig Dulay (The Baseball Player); Tata Illenberger (Bakit ‘Di Mo Sabihin?); Michael Lacanilao and Anna Isabelle Matutina (12 Weeks); Gilbert Obispo (Broken Blooms); Noah Tonga (Doll House)
Movie Musical Scorer of the Year	Movie Musical Scorer of the Year (Indie)
Winner: **Cesar Francis Concio** (Family Matters): Von De Guzman (My Father, Myself); Diwa De Leon (Bahay Na Pula); Riki Gonzales (Mamasapano: Now It Can Be Told); Jessie Lasaten (Labyu with an Accent); Myka Magsaysay and Paul Sigua (Deleter); Greg Rodriguez III (Nanahimik ang Gabi)	Winner: **Jessie Lasaten** (Doll House): Jake Abella (Broken Blooms); Mikey Amistoso and Jazz Nicolas (Blue Room); Teresa Barrozo (Bakit ‘Di Mo Sabihin?); Alyana Cabral and Pan de Coco (Leonor Will Never Die); Pepe Manikan (The Baseball Player); Emerzon Texon (Live Scream)
Movie Sound Engineer of the Year (Mainstream)	Movie Sound Engineer of the Year (Indie)
Winner: **Armand De Guzman, Aian Louie Caro, Russel Gabayeron** (Deleter): Joshua Alavata (Family Matters); Armand De Guzman, Aian Louie Caro, Russel Gabayeron (Mamasapano: Now It Can Be Told); Albert Michael Idioma and Janina Mikaela Minglanilla (Labyu with an Accent); Andrea Idioma and Emilio Bien Sparks (Nanahimik ang Gabi); Fatima Nerikka Salim (My Father, Myself); Immanuel Verona (May–December-January)	Winner: **Fatima Nerikka Salim and Immanuel Verona** (Live Scream): Lamberto Casas Jr. (12 Weeks); Michael Keanu Cruz and Jannina Mikaela Minglanilla (Blue Room); JM Leaño (Doll House); Hugo Leitao (Kapag Wala Nang mga Alon); Gilbert Obispo (Broken Blooms); Alex Tomboc (The Baseball Player)
Movie Theme Song of the Year (Mainstream)	Movie Theme Song of the Year (Indie)
Winner: **"Aking Mahal"** - composed by Atty. Ferdinand Topacio and Cristy Fermin, interpreted by Atty. Ferdinand Topacio (Mamasapano: Now It Can Be Told): "Sa Hawak Mo" – composed and produced by Paulo Zarate, interpreted by Floyd Tena (Family Matters); "Sandal Ka Lang" – lyrics by Carla Concio, composed and arranged by Francis Concio, interpreted by Toni Gonzaga (My Teacher)	Winner: **"Hihintayin Kita"** - composed by Louie Ignacio, interpreted by Jeric Gonzales (Broken Blooms): "Bayan Ko" – composed by Juan Karlos, interpreted by Rebel Rebel (Blue Room); "Hindi Ka Kulang" – arranged by Andrew Constantino, composed and interpreted by Mira Aquino of Gandaras (Sugat sa Dugo); "Tanging Tunay" – composed by Alyana Cabral, Ghabby Gee, Joe Salcedo, Juanito Encantado, interpreted by Pan De Coco and Sheila Francisco (Leonor Will Never Die)

=== Short films ===
Short Movie of the Year	Short Movie Director of the Year
Winner: **Ang Pangungumpisal** (Philippine High School for the Arts): Ang Pagbangon ni Pina (CineCam Norte Film Tourism Guild, Provincial Government of Camarines Norte, New V Media Entertainment Philippines); Ang Pagliligtas sa Dalagang Bukid (Archipelago Productions, Kapengmukha Productions, QCinema, Quezon City Film Development Commission); As the Moth Flies (Creative Kartel, Desi Matters, Happy Manila); Habak ng Mga Manide [The Tribe Leader] (Cinekula Production, CineCamNorte Film Tourism Guild); Hibik sa Entablado (NCR Core Productions); Hutik sang mga Kuliglig [Whisper of Cicadas] (Talahib Films)	Winner: **Gayle Oblea** (As the Moth Flies): Luke Del Castillo (Hutik sang mga Kuliglig); Minnesota Flores (Ang Pangungumpisal); Jude Matanguihan (Suka and Toyo Can Make Adobo); Kevin Piamonte (Dog Eaters); Vincent Ricafrente (Ang Pagbangon ni Pina); Rey Tamayo Jr. (Hibik sa Entablado)

== Special awards ==
Darling of the Press	Movie Loveteam of the Year
Winner: Rhea Anicoche-Tan: Gretchen Barretto; Edinel Calvario; Liza Diño; Martin Nievera; Robin Padilla; Piolo Pascual; Alden Richards; Wilbert Tolentino	Winner: JC de Vera and Janine Gutierrez (Bakit ‘Di Mo Sabihin?): Carlo Aquino and Julia Barretto (Expensive Candy); Coco Martin and Jodi Santamaria (Labyu with an Accent); Donny Pangilinan and Belle Mariano (An Inconvenient Love); Jeric Gonzales and Therese Malvar (Broken Blooms); McCoy de Leon and Elisse Joson (Habangbuhay); Ronnie Alonte and Loisa Andalio (My Teacher)

- Nora Aunor Ulirang Artista Lifetime Achievement Award - Roderick Paulate
- Ulirang Alagad ng Pelikula sa Likod ng Kamera Lifetime Achievement Award - Robbie Tan
- Male Star of The Night - JC de Vera
- Female Star of the Night - Ara Mina
- Face of the Night - Andrea Del Rosario
- Male Celebrity of the Night - Baron Geisler
- Female Celebrity of the Night - Gladys Reyes

== Most nominations ==
The following table lists the films with the most nominations for this PMPC Star Awards for Movies edition. Counts include all competitive categories.

Nominations by Film
Nominations	Film
18	Family Matters
14	Blue Room
12	Broken Blooms
12	Mamasapano: Now It Can Told

== Most wins ==
The following table lists the films with the most wins for this PMPC Star Awards for Movies edition. Counts include all competitive categories.

Wins by Films
Wins	Films
6	Mamasapano: Now It Can Told
5	Broken Blooms
4	Family Matters
