= PMPC Star Award for Movie of the Year =

Filipino award for movie of the year

PMPC Star Awards for Movies for Movie of the Year
- Awarded for: Best Picture
- Country: Philippines
- Presented by: Philippine Movie Press Club
- First award: 1985
- Currently held by: Uninvited (2024); AbeNida (2024) (Indie)

The PMPC Star Award for Movie of the Year is presented by the Philippine Movie Press Club (PMPC) to recognize outstanding achievements in the Philippine motion picture industry. PMPC, an organization of active entertainment journalists in the Philippines, has awarded this prize since the inaugural ceremony in 1985. It is considered one of the top honors of the PMPC Star Awards for Movies.

== Winners and nominees ==
The winners of the PMPC Star Award for Movie of the Year are listed below by year, with the winner presented first, followed by the other nominees where available. This list may be incomplete, particularly for the early years of the awards, and may not include all nominees.

Table key
‡	Indicates the winner

=== 1980s ===
Year	Film	Film Studio
1985 (1st)
1985 (1st)	Sister Stella L.	Regal Films
1985 (1st)	Adultery	Regal Films
1985 (1st)	Soltero	Experimental Cinema of the Philippines
1985 (1st)	Merika	Adrian Films
1985 (1st)	Bulaklak sa City Jail	Cherubim Films
1985 (1st)	Alyas Baby Tsina	Viva Films
1986 (2nd)
1986 (2nd)	Hinugot Sa Langit	Regal Films
1986 (2nd)	Miguelito, Ang Batang Rebelde	D'Wonder Films
1987 (3rd)
1987 (3rd)	Unfaithful Wife	Regal Films
1988 (4th)
1988 (4th)	Saan Nagtatago Ang Pag-ibig?	Viva Films
1989 (5th)
1989 (5th)	Itanong Mo sa Buwan	Viva Films

=== 1990s ===
Year	Film	Film Studio
1990 (6th)
1990 (6th)	Pahiram Ng Isang Umaga	Regal Films
1991 (7th)
1991 (7th)	Andrea, Paano Ba ang Maging Isang Ina?	MRN Films
1992 (8th)
1992 (8th)	Sa Kabila ng Lahat	Viva Films
1993 (9th)
1993 (9th)	Ikaw ang Lahat sa Akin	Regal Films
1994 (10th)
1994 (10th)	Winner not verifiable	
1995 (11th)
1995 (11th)	Winner not verifiable	
1996 (12th)
1996 (12th)	The Flor Contemplacion Story	Viva Films
1996 (12th)	Dahas	MAQ Productions
1996 (12th)	Inagaw Mo ang Lahat sa Akin	Reyna Films
1997 (13th)
1997 (13th)	Mumbaki	Neo Films
1997 (13th)	Bakit May Kahapon Pa?	I AM Productions and Viva Films
1997 (13th)	Madrasta	Star Cinema
1997 (13th)	Segurista	Neo Films
1998 (14th)
1998 (14th)	Rizal sa Dapitan	Independent Cinema Association of the Philippines, Movpix International
1998 (14th)	Nasaan ang Puso	MAQ Productions
1999 (15th)
1999 (15th)	José Rizal	GMA Films, Neptune Productions
1999 (15th)	Sana Pag-Ibig Na	Available Light Production, Good Harvest Regal Films,

=== 2000s ===
Year	Film	Film Studio
2000 (16th)
2000 (16th)	Bulaklak ng Maynila	Viva Films
2000 (16th)	Saranggola	GMA Films, Teamwork Productions
2000 (16th)	Sidhi	Crown Seven Ventures, Solar Entertainment
2001 (17th)
2001 (17th)	Bayaning Third World	Cinema Artist Phil.
2001 (17th)	Laro sa Baga	Regal Films
2002 (18th)
2002 (18th)	Tuhog	Available Light, Regal Entertainment
2003 (19th)
2003 (19th)	Mga Munting Tinig	Teamwork Productions
2004 (20th)
2004 (20th)	Magnifico	Violett Films Production
2005 (21st)
2005 (21st)	Milan	Star Cinema
2006 (22nd)
2006 (22nd)	Blue Moon	Regal Films
2006 (22nd)	Ako Legal Wife: Mano Po 4?	MAQ Productions
2006 (22nd)	Dubai	Star Cinema
2006 (22nd)	La Visa Loca	Unitel Pictures
2006 (22nd)	Nasaan Ka Man	Star Cinema
2007 (23rd)
2007 (23rd)	Kasal, Kasali, Kasalo	Star Cinema
2007 (23rd)	Don't Give Up on Us	Star Cinema
2007 (23rd)	Kaleldo	Center Stage Productions
2007 (23rd)	Ligalig	CM Films
2007 (23rd)	Pacquiao: The Movie	Star Cinema, FLT Films International
2007 (23rd)	You Are the One	Star Cinema
2008 (24th)
2008 (24th)	One More Chance	Star Cinema
2008 (24th)	Angels	Eagle Eye Entertainment Productions
2008 (24th)	Ataul: For Rent	Artiste Entertainment Works International
2008 (24th)	Katas ng Saudi	Maverick Films
2008 (24th)	Ouija	GMA Films, Viva Films
2008 (24th)	Sakal, Sakali, Saklolo	Star Cinema
2008 (24th)	A Love Story	Star Cinema
2009 (25th)
2009 (25th)	Baler	Viva Films, Bida Productions
2009 (25th)	A Very Special Love	Star Cinema
2009 (25th)	Caregiver	Star Cinema
2009 (25th)	Mag-ingat Ka Sa... Kulam	Regal Films
2009 (25th)	Magkaibigan	Regal Films
2009 (25th)	Ploning	Panoramanila Pictures

=== 2010s ===
Year	Film	Film Studio
2010 (26th)
2010 (26th)	In My Life	Star Cinema
2010 (26th)	Ang Panday	GMA Films, Imus Productions
2010 (26th)	I Love You, Goodbye	Star Cinema
2010 (26th)	Kimmy Dora: Kambal sa Kiyeme	Spring Films
2010 (26th)	Mano Po 6: A Mother's Love	Regal Films
2011 (27th)
2011 (27th)	Ang Tanging Ina Mo: Last Na 'To!	Star Cinema
2011 (27th)	Emir	Film Development Council of the Philippines
2011 (27th)	Rosario	Cinemabuhay, Studio 5
2011 (27th)	Only Yours	Star Cinema
2011 (27th)	Shake, Rattle and Roll 12	Regal Films
2011 (27th)	Here Comes the Bride	Star Cinema, Quantum Films, OctoArts Films
2012 (28th)
2012 (28th)	Manila Kingpin: The Asiong Salonga Story	Viva Films, Scenema Concept International
2012 (28th)	Ang Panday 2	Imus Productions, GMA Films
2012 (28th)	Aswang	Regal Films
2012 (28th)	In the Name of Love	Star Cinema, ABS-CBN Film Productions
2012 (28th)	No Other Woman	Viva Films, Star Cinema, ABS-CBN Film Productions
2012 (28th)	The Road	GMA Films
2012 (28th)	My Neighbor's Wife	Regal Films
2013 (29th)
2013 (29th)	El Presidente	Scenema Concept International, Viva Films, CMB
2013 (29th)	A Mother's Story	Star Cinema and The Filipino Channel
2013 (29th)	I Do Bidoo Bidoo: Heto nApo sila!	Unitel Pictures, Studio 5
2013 (29th)	One More Try	Star Cinema
2013 (29th)	The Healing	Star Cinema
2013 (29th)	The Mistress	Star Cinema
2013 (29th)	Tiktik: The Aswang Chronicles	Post Manila, GMA Pictures
2014 (30th)
2014 (30th)	On the Job	Reality Entertainment and Star Cinema
2014 (30th)	10,000 Hours	Philippine Film Studios, Viva Films, and N2 Productions
2014 (30th)	Dance Of The Steel Bars	Portfolio Films and GMA Films
2014 (30th)	Four Sisters and a Wedding	Star Cinema
2014 (30th)	Shoot to Kill: Boy Golden	Scenema Concept International and Viva Films
2015 (31st)
2015 (31st)	Bonifacio: Ang Unang Pangulo	Philippians Productions & Entertainment Inc., Tuko Film Productions, Buchi Boy Films, and RCP Productions
2015 (31st)	English Only, Please	Quantum Films, MJM Productions Inc., Artikulo Uno, Tuko Film Productions
2015 (31st)	Starting Over Again	Star Cinema
2015 (31st)	The Gifted	Viva Films and Multi Vision Films
2015 (31st)	The Trial	Star Cinema
2015 (31st)	Trophy Wife	Viva Films and MVP Entertainment
2016 (32nd)
2016 (32nd)	Felix Manalo	(Viva Films, Iglesia ni Cristo
2016 (32nd)	A Second Chance	Star Cinema
2016 (32nd)	Crazy Beautiful You	Star Cinema
2016 (32nd)	Etiquette for Mistresses	Star Cinema
2016 (32nd)	Heneral Luna	Artikulo Uno Productions
2016 (32nd)	Honor Thy Father	Reality Entertainment
2016 (32nd)	The Love Affair	Star Cinema
2016 (32nd)	Walang Forever	Quantum Films, MJM Productions, Tuko Films, and Buchi Boy Films
2017 (33rd)
2017 (33rd)	Die Beautiful	Regal Entertainment and The IdeaFirst Company
2017 (33rd)	Barcelona: A Love Untold	Star Cinema
2017 (33rd)	Camp Sawi	Viva Films
2017 (33rd)	Dukot	TEN17P Films and Star Cinema
2017 (33rd)	Everything About Her	Star Cinema
2017 (33rd)	Imagine You and Me	GMA Films, APT Entertainment, MZET TV Production
2017 (33rd)	Seklusyon	Reality Entertainment
2017 (33rd)	The Unmarried Wife	Star Cinema
2017 (33rd)	Whistleblower	Unitel Productions and Quento Media
2018 (34th)
2018 (34th)	Kita Kita	Spring Films and Viva Films
2018 (34th)	100 Tula Para Kay Stella	Viva Films
2018 (34th)	Ang Larawan	Culturtain Musicat Productions
2018 (34th)	Deadma Walking	T-Rex Entertainment Productions and Octo Arts Films
2018 (34th)	Love You to the Stars and Back	Star Cinema
2018 (34th)	Seven Sundays	Star Cinema
2018 (34th)	Siargao	TEN17P
2018 (34th)	Unexpectedly Yours	Star Cinema
2019 (35th)
2019 (35th)	Rainbow's Sunset	Heaven's Best Entertainment
2019 (35th)	Ang Dalawang Mrs. Reyes	Star Cinema, Quantum Films, The Idea First Company
2019 (35th)	Buy Bust	Reality Entertainment and Viva Films
2019 (35th)	Goyo: Ang Batang Heneral	TBA Studios and Globe Studios
2019 (35th)	Signal Rock	Regal Entertainment and CSR Productions
2019 (35th)	The Hows of Us	Star Cinema

=== 2020s ===
Year	Film	Film Studio
2021 (36th)
2021 (36th)	Hello, Love, Goodbye	Star Cinema
2021 (36th)	LSS	Globe Studios and Dokimos Media Inc.
2021 (36th)	Maria	BlackOps Studios Asia and Viva Films
2021 (36th)	Quezon's Game	Star Cinema, Kinitek Productions, iWant
2021 (36th)	The Panti Sisters	Black Sheep Productions, The IdeaFirst Company, Quantum Films
2021 (36th)	Unforgettable	Viva Films and The IdeaFirst Company
2021 (36th)	Write About Love	TBA Studios
2022 (37th)
2022 (37th)	UnTrue	Viva Films, IdeaFirst Company, October Train Films
2022 (37th)	Fan Girl	Black Sheep, Globe Studios, Epicmedia Productions, Project 8 Projects, Crossword Productions
2022 (37th)	Four Sisters Before the Wedding	Star Cinema
2022 (37th)	Isa Pang Bahaghari	Heaven's Best Entertainment
2022 (37th)	Love Lockdown	Dreamscape Entertainment and iWantTFC
2022 (37th)	Nightshift	Viva Films, Aliud Entertainment, ImaginePerSecond
2022 (37th)	On Vodka, Beers, and Regrets	Viva Films
2022 (37th)	Us Again	Regal Entertainment
2023 (38th)
2023 (38th)	On the Job 2: The Missing 8	Reality MM Studios, Globe Studios, HBO Asia Originals
2023 (38th)	Big Night!	Cignal Entertainment, Quantum Films, IdeaFirst Company, October Train Films
2023 (38th)	Deception	Viva Films and Borracho Film Productions
2023 (38th)	Huling Ulan sa Tag-Araw	Heaven's Best Entertainment
2023 (38th)	Kun Maupay Man It Panahon	Black Sheep, iWantTFC, Globe Studios, Cinematografica, planc., Quantum Films, CMB Films, House on Fire, AAND Company, KawanKawan Media, Weydemann Bros.
2023 (38th)	My Amanda	Spring Films and AWOO
2023 (38th)	Resbak	Cignal Entertainment and Center Stage Productions
2024 (39th)
2024 (39th)	Mamasapano: Now It Can Be Told	Borracho Film Productions
2024 (39th)	Deleter	Viva Films
2024 (39th)	Family Matters	Cineko Productions and Top Story
2024 (39th)	May–December–January	Viva Films
2024 (39th)	My Father, Myself	3:16 Media Network and Mentorque Productions
2024 (39th)	My Teacher	Ten17P and Tincan Productions
2024 (39th)	Nanahimik ang Gabi	Rein Entertainment Productions
2024 (40th)
2024 (40th)	Mallari	Mentorque Inc. and Cleverminds Inc.
2024 (40th)	Family of Two	Cineko Productions
2024 (40th)	Firefly	GMA Public Affairs and GMA Pictures
2024 (40th)	Five Breakups and a Romance	Cornerstone Studios, GMA Pictures, Myriad Entertainment
2024 (40th)	Gomburza	JesCom Films and MQuest Ventures, and CMB Films
2024 (40th)	Rewind	ABS-CBN Film Productions, APT Entertainment, AgostoDos Pictures
2024 (40th)	When I Met You In Tokyo	JG Productions Inc.
2025 (41st)
2025 (41st)	Uninvited	Mentorque Productions, Project 8 Projects
2025 (41st)	Espantaho	Quantum Films, Cineko Productions, Purple Bunny Productions
2025 (41st)	Green Bones	GMA Pictures, GMA Public Affairs, Brightburn Entertainment
2025 (41st)	Hello, Love, Again	ABS-CBN Films, GMA Pictures
2025 (41st)	Isang Himala	UxS Inc., CreaZion Studios, Kapitol Films, CMB Film Service, Inc.
2025 (41st)	My Future You	Regal Entertainment
2025 (41st)	Topakk	Nathan Studios, Strawdogs Studio Production, Fusee
2025 (41st)	Un/Happy for You	ABS-CBN Films, Viva Films

== Indie movie of the year ==
In recognition of the rise of independent filmmaking, the PMPC Star Awards introduced the Digital Movie of the Year category in 2006, with Ang Pagdadalaga ni Maximo Oliveros as its first winner. The award retained the “Digital Movie” name until 2012 and has been called Indie Movie of the Year in subsequent ceremonies. It is presented annually to recognize outstanding films in the independent or digital filmmaking sector.

=== 2000s ===
Year	Film	Film Studio
2006 (22nd)
2006 (22nd)	Ang Pagdadalaga ni Maximo Oliveros	UFO Pictures
2006 (22nd)	ICU Bed #7	Mediarevolution Film Productions
2006 (22nd)	Masahista	Gee Films International
2006 (22nd)	Mga Pusang Gala	Erastro Productions
2006 (22nd)	Ang Daan Patungong Kalimugtong	Sampaybakod Productions, Cinelarga
2007 (23rd)
2007 (23rd)	Inang Yaya	Unitel Pictures
2007 (23rd)	Batad	Philippine Company of Performing Arts
2007 (23rd)	Donsol	Bicycle Pictures
2007 (23rd)	Kubrador	MLR Films
2007 (23rd)	Rome & Juliet	I.O.U. One Productions
2008 (24th)
2008 (24th)	Confessional	Cinema One Originals, Oddfield Productions
2008 (24th)	Pisay	Solito Arts, PSHS Foundation, PSHS Class of 1986 Foundation
2008 (24th)	Selda	Star View Productions
2008 (24th)	Tambolista	Cinema One Originals
2008 (24th)	Tribu	8 Glasses Productions
2009 (25th)
2009 (25th)	Yanggaw	Cinema One Originals, Strawdogs Studio Production
2009 (25th)	100	Martinez Rivera Films
2009 (25th)	Boses	Erasto Productions
2009 (25th)	Paupahan	ATD Entertainment
2009 (25th)	Torotot (Destierro)	Viva Digital
2009 (25th)	Sisa	OnCAM Productions
2009 (25th)	Jay	Pasion Para Pelicula Productions

=== 2010s ===
Year	Film	Film Studio
2010 (26th)
2010 (26th)	Puntod	ADC Productions
2010 (26th)	Astig	Cinemalaya Foundation, Boy Abunda and Boy So Productions
2010 (26th)	Ded Na Si Lolo	APT Entertainment and Directors' Guild of the Phils.
2010 (26th)	Dinig Sana Kita	Cinemalaya Foundation and Echo & Mirage Media
2010 (26th)	Dukot	CDP Events and Entertainment Productions and ATD Entertainment
2011 (27th)
2011 (27th)	Sigwa	Beginnings Twenty Plus Production, Sineng Totoo Production and Star Express
2011 (27th)	Donor	Spark Films
2011 (27th)	Mayohan	Cinemalaya Foundation Inc. and Alpha Dog Productions
2011 (27th)	Muli	MJM Productions
2011 (27th)	Senior Year	Digitank Studios and Metric Films
2011 (27th)	Tarima	Bluegold Productions
2011 (27th)	The Red Shoes	Unitel Productions and Unico Entertainment
2012 (28th)
2012 (28th)	Thelma	Time Horizon Pictures, Abracadabra Productions, Underground Logic
2012 (28th)	Ang Babae Sa Septic Tank	Cinemalaya Foundation, Martinez-Rivera Films, Quantum Films Production
2012 (28th)	Ang Sayaw ng Dalawang Kaliwang Paa	Cinemalaya Foundation, Vim Yapan, Alex Chua Productions, Bigtime Media Productions, SQ Films Laboratories, Inc., Optima Digital
2012 (28th)	Ikaw Ang Pag-ibig	Star Cinema, Archdiocese of Caceres, Marilou Diaz-Abaya Film Institute and Arts Center
2012 (28th)	Niño	Cinemalaya Foundation, Handurawan Films
2012 (28th)	Patikul	Cinemalaya Foundation, Xiti Productions, Sine Totoo Production
2012 (28th)	Sa Ilalim Ng Tulay	Cinema One Originals
2013 (29th)
2013 (29th)	Alagwa	Breakaway Films
2013 (29th)	Amorosa, The Revenge	Skylight Films
2013 (29th)	Bwakaw	Octobertrain Films, APT Entertainment, and Cinemalaya
2013 (29th)	Graceland	Imprint Pictures and Digitank Studios
2013 (29th)	Mater Dolorosa	Creative Programs, Inc.
2013 (29th)	Mga Mumunting Lihim	LargaVista Entertainment, and Cinemalaya
2013 (29th)	Thy Womb	Centerstage Productions
2014 (30th)
2014 (30th)	Badil	Waray Republik and Film Development Council of the Philippines
2014 (30th)	Ang Huling Cha-Cha ni Anita	CineFilipino, Studio 5, and Pixeleyes Multimedia
2014 (30th)	Ano Ang Kulay Ng Mga Nakalimutang Pangarap	LargaVista Entertainment and Film Development Council of the Philippines
2014 (30th)	Bamboo Flowers	Productions 56 and Film Development Council of the Philippines
2014 (30th)	Ekstra	Cinemalaya Foundation and Quantum Films
2014 (30th)	Kabisera	Creative Program, Inc. and Reality Entertainment
2014 (30th)	Sonata	My Own Mann Productions, Ruby’s Arms Productions, and Film Development Council of the Philippines
2015 (31st)
2015 (31st)	The Janitor	APT Entertainment, Inc. and Cinemalaya Foundation
2015 (31st)	1st Ko Si 3Rd	Fire Starters Manila Productions Company and Cinemalaya Foundation
2015 (31st)	Dementia	The IdeaFirst Company, Octobertrain Films, and TV5
2015 (31st)	Hari Ng Tondo	Reynafilms, Central Digital Lab, Star Cinema, and Cinemalaya Foundation
2015 (31st)	Maratabat: Pride and Honor	Blank Pages Productions
2015 (31st)	Mga Kuwentong Barbero	Hong Kong-Asia Film Financing Forum, Octobertrain Films, and APT Entertainment, Inc.
2015 (31st)	Sundalong Kanin	Front Media Entertainment, SQ Film Laboratories, Inc. and Cinemalaya Foundation
2016 (32nd)
2016 (32nd)	Bambanti	Sinag Maynila and Centerstage Productions
2016 (32nd)	Anino sa Likod ng Buwan	IdeaFirst Company, Octobertrain Films, and APT Entertainment
2016 (32nd)	I Love You, Thank You	Grit Project and Noel Ferrer Productions
2016 (32nd)	Imbisibol	Sinag Maynila and Centerstage Productions
2016 (32nd)	Old Skool	Til I’m 90 Film Productions and Bonfire Productions
2016 (32nd)	Silong	SQ Film Laboratories and Black Maria Pictures
2016 (32nd)	Taklub	Centerstage Productions
2016 (32nd)	Tandem	Tuko Films and Buchi Boy Films
2017 (33rd)
2017 (33rd)	Pamilya Ordinaryo	Cinemalaya Foundation, Outpost Visual Frontier, Found Films
2017 (33rd)	1st Sem	Cine Filipino, Unitel Productions, TC Entertainment, and Kayan Film Productions
2017 (33rd)	Ang Babaeng Humayo	Cinema One Originals and Sine Olivia Pilipinas
2017 (33rd)	Kabisera	Firestarters Productions
2017 (33rd)	Kusina	Cinemalaya Foundation and Cinematografica Films
2017 (33rd)	Ma’Rosa	Center Stage Productions
2017 (33rd)	Paglipay	Universal Harvester and ZMD Productions
2017 (33rd)	Patay na si Hesus	T-Rex Entertainment, Epicmedia, Above The Line, and Moira Lang
2017 (33rd)	Pauwi Na	Universal Harvester and Pollen Productions
2017 (33rd)	Tibak, The Story of Kabataang Makabayan	Blank Pages Productions
2018 (34th)
2018 (34th)	Changing Partners	Cinema One Originals
2018 (34th)	Bar Boys	Tropic Frills Film Productions
2018 (34th)	Bhoy Intsik	Frontrow Entertainment
2018 (34th)	Birdshot	TBA Studios and Pelikula Red
2018 (34th)	Bliss	TBA Studios
2018 (34th)	Guerrero	EBC Films
2018 (34th)	I’m Drunk, I Love You	TBA Studios
2018 (34th)	Respeto	Cinemalaya Foundation, Arkeofilms, and Dogzilla
2019 (35th)
2019 (35th)	Citizen Jake	Cinema Artists Philippines
2019 (35th)	Bakwit Boys	T-Rex Entertainment Productions
2019 (35th)	Distance	Cinemalaya Foundation, The Idea First Company, CMB Film Services
2019 (35th)	Hintayan Ng Langit	QCinema, Project 8 Corner San Joaquin Projects, Globe Studios
2019 (35th)	Kung Paano Hinihintay Ang Dapithapon	Cinemalaya Foundation, Cleverminds Inc., Cineko Productions
2019 (35th)	Liway	Cinemalaya Foundation, VY/AC Productions, Exquisite Aspect
2019 (35th)	ML	Cinemalaya Foundation, Lonewolf Films, CMB Film Services

=== 2020s ===
Year	Film	Film Studio
2021 (36th)
2021 (36th)	Mindanao	Center Stage Productions
2021 (36th)	Babae At Baril	Cignal Entertainment, Epicmedia, QCinema
2021 (36th)	Edward	Cinemalaya Foundation, Awkward Penguin, Viva Films, Outpost Visual Frontier
2021 (36th)	Guerrero Dos, Tuloy Ang Laban	EBC Films
2021 (36th)	John Denver Trending	Cinemalaya Foundation, What If Films Philippines, Southern Lantern Pictures, Tinker Bulb Productions, Outpost Visual Frontier
2021 (36th)	Kalel, 15	The IdeaFirst Company, Octobertrain Films, Cignal Entertainment
2021 (36th)	Lola Igna	ERJ Found Films and EMBA Productions
2021 (36th)	Metamorphosis	Rebelde Films and Cinema One Originals
2022 (37th)
2022 (37th)	Tagpuan	Alternative Vision Cinema
2022 (37th)	Coming Home	ALV Films and Maverick Films
2022 (37th)	He Who Is Without Sin	Sinag Maynila and Solar Pictures
2022 (37th)	Lahi, Hayop	Sine Olivia Pilipinas
2022 (37th)	Magikland	Brightlight Productions and Gallaga-Reyes Films
2022 (37th)	Suarez, The Healing Priest	Saranggola Media Productions
2022 (37th)	The Boy Foretold By The Stars	Clever Minds, Brainstormers Lab, The Dolly Collection, Purple Pig
2022 (37th)	Watch List	BRON Studios, State of Awe, Reality Entertainment
2023 (38th)
2023 (38th)	Katips	PhilStagers Films
2023 (38th)	A Far Away Land	Mavx Productions
2023 (38th)	Arisaka	Ten17P Films
2023 (38th)	Gensan Punch	Center Stage Productions and Gentle Underground Monkeys
2023 (38th)	Historia Ni Ha	Sine Olivia Pilipinas
2023 (38th)	Lockdown	For The Love of Art Films
2023 (38th)	Nelia	A and Q Production Films, Inc.
2024 (39th)
2024 (39th)	Broken Blooms	BenTria Productions
2024 (39th)	12 Weeks	Cinemalaya Foundation, Film Development Council of the Philippines, Digital Dreams
2024 (39th)	Bakit ‘Di Mo Sabihin?	Cinemalaya Foundation, Firestarters Productions, Viva Films
2024 (39th)	Blue Room	Cinemalaya Foundation, CreatePH Films, Eyepoppers Multiservices Services, Heaven’s Best Entertainment
2024 (39th)	Doll House	Mavx Film Productions and Netflix Originals
2024 (39th)	Live Scream	The IdeaFirst Company, Powerhouse Media Capital, Viva Films
2024 (39th)	The Baseball Player	Cinemalaya Foundation, Rough Road Productions, Mavx Film Productions, Nokarin, Borj At Work Films
2024 (40th)
2024 (40th)	Litrato	3:16 Media Network
2024 (40th)	Ako Si Ninoy	Philippine Stagers Films
2024 (40th)	Fall Guy	3:16 Media Network, Mentorque Productions
2024 (40th)	In His Mother’s Eyes	7K Productions
2024 (40th)	Iti Mapukpukaw	Cinemalaya Foundation, Project 8 Projects, Terminal Six, and GMA Public Affairs
2024 (40th)	Monday First Screening	Net25 Films and Lonewolf Films
2024 (40th)	Pieta	Alternative Vision Cinema
2025 (41st)
2025 (41st)	AbeNida	BG Productions International
2025 (41st)	A Journey	Mavx Productions
2025 (41st)	Balota	Cinemalaya Foundation, GMA Pictures, GMA Entertainment Group, Film Development Council of the Philippines
2025 (41st)	Her Locket	Rebecca Chuaunsu Film Production, Rebelde Films
2025 (41st)	Huwag Mo ‘Kong Iwan	BenTria Productions
2025 (41st)	Moro	CenterStage Productions
2025 (41st)	Pushcart Tales	Puregold CinePanalo, WAF Studios
2025 (41st)	Under A Piaya Moon	Puregold CinePanalo, Bakunawa Films, Green Pelican Studios, Jungle Room Creatives, Cloudy Duck Pictures
