= Veneracion =

Veneracion is a surname. Notable people with the surname include:

- Andrea Veneracion (1928–2013), Filipino choral conductor and musician
- Ian Veneracion (born 1973), Filipino athlete, actor, pilot, and singer
- Roy Veneracion (born 1947), Filipino painter

== See also ==
- Veneration
