= Pangako sa 'Yo season 2 =

Pangako sa 'Yo
- Season 2
- Starring: Kathryn Bernardo; Daniel Padilla; Jodi Sta. Maria; Angelica Panganiban; Ian Veneracion
- No. of episodes: 65

Release
- Original network: ABS-CBN
- Original release: November 16, 2015 – February 12, 2016

Season chronology
- ← Previous; Season 1

The second and final season of Pangako sa 'Yo, a Philippine television drama aired on ABS-CBN, premiered on November 16, 2015 on ABS-CBN's Primetime Bida evening block and worldwide on The Filipino Channel and concluded February 12, 2016, with a total 65 episodes. Directed by Rory Quintos, Dado Lumibao, and Olivia Lamasan, the series stars Kathryn Bernardo and Daniel Padilla as Yna Macaspac and Angelo Buenavista, together with an ensemble cast consisting of Jodi Sta. Maria, Angelica Panganiban, Ian Veneracion, Amy Austria-Ventura, Ronnie Lazaro, Tirso Cruz III, Andrea Brillantes, Diego Loyzaga, Dominic Roque, and Sue Ramirez.

== Plot ==
The second season begins with the Buenavista family's lives after the disposition of the Buenavista family two years prior. Angelo (Daniel Padilla) now works as a baker in the humble bakery owned by Lolo Greggy (Tirso Cruz III) — the man who saved Angelo during an accident. Meanwhile, Lia (Andrea Brillantes) fails to accept the events which causes her to become rude and snobbish.

After two years in jail, Eduardo (Ian Veneracion) is finally released and decides to rekindle his love with Amor (Jodi Sta. Maria), much to the detriment of Lia. Amor decides to let Eduardo court her which results in him proposing to her. Yna (Kathryn Bernardo) returns from California and now owns her own restaurant and reunites with Angelo — this time Yna as the boss and Angelo as the employee. Several circumstances almost reunite the two but are constantly postponed. Meanwhile, Belen (Amy Austria-Ventura) continues to blame Yna — for the death of Caloy (Joem Bascon).

Lia tries to fit in with the popular girls in her school but is constantly humiliated and rejected. David (Diego Loyzaga) is revealed to have cancer and is longing for Yna's presence — but Yna is longing for Angelo. Amor decides to connive with Yna and starts an agreement with her. David and Yna become a couple, leaving Angelo heartbroken. Angelo becomes drunk and goes to Joy (Sue Ramirez). Meanwhile, Joy admits her feelings to Angelo that she loves him but is rejected. Amor becomes desperate as David illness becomes worst and tries to find comfort in Eduardo.

Meanwhile in Sta. Ines, Claudia (Angelica Panganiban) is revealed to be alive and living under an alias — Greta. Simon (Alex Medina), Claudia's lover, saved her from the car accident which involved her, Caloy, and also Diego (Bernard Palanca). Unfortunately, Claudia is suffering from amnesia. Meanwhile, Irma (Rubi Rubi), Amor's neighbor from Punta Verde, becomes one of Claudia's patients in the shelter in Sta. Ines and informs the latter that Maria Amor survived the accident and that Irma's daughter was crushed by rock together with Chayong (Sharmaine Suarez), Amor's stepmother.

After hearing this, Claudia regains her memories and plans to return to her family and plans to get revenge — on Amor and Yna. On the wedding of Amor and Eduardo, Claudia appears and makes everyone believe that she has amnesia. She starts a connivance with Mark (Dominic Roque) — Amor's ex-employee who wants revenge on her. Claudia then finds out that Maria Amor is Yna. She then kills David who later found out that Maria Amor is Yna and made it look like a suicide. Meanwhile, Amor blames Yna for David's apparent suicide.

Yna and Angelo elope and plan to get married. After seeing Yna's baby photos — Amor realizes that Yna is Maria Amor and stops the wedding between her and Angelo. Yna and Amor reunite and form a mother-daughter relationship. Angelo moves on from Yna and starts investigating Claudia's past — with Simon. Angelo and Simon then confront each other — Claudia then reveals that Simon is Angelo's biological father. Because of this revelation, Angelo continues his relationship with Yna.

Amor then discovers the missing camera footage from the hospital on the day of David's death. Amor sees Claudia in the footage. The security guard then points out Claudia and Mark as the culprits. Meanwhile, Amor and Belen then confront Claudia blaming her for the respective children's deaths — David and Caloy especially Eduardo who decide to revenge on his wife for his brother Diego death. The police then arrest Claudia. Mark then helps Claudia escape from the jail and plans their final attempt to kill Amor and Yna. Mark kidnaps Yna and Amor and brings them to his hideout. Claudia then plans to cement Amor and Yna. Meanwhile, Simon informs Angelo on how he helped Claudia from the car accident and that she is planning to kill Amor and Yna. Angelo rushes to find Amor and Yna and rescues them from Claudia.

Angelo convinces Claudia to surrender and she does. Mark then shoots Angelo causing Claudia to shoot him. Mark then attempts to kill Angelo but Claudia shields him which causes her to get shot. Angelo and Claudia then get rushed to the hospital.

Yna and Angelo then make a promise to be with each other until the end. He then survives and recovers from Mark's gunshot.

After getting shot by Mark, Claudia is now blind. In court, Claudia admits all of her crimes and including the murders of Diego, Caloy, David, and also Mark and spoken about her past for what she been through with her mother and told them the reason why she wanted to revenge and steal her father's fortune is for not helping her mother sickness. Claudia begs forgiveness for everyone she wronged and renews herself and accepts her life imprisonment sentence. Amor also then apologizes to Claudia for involving her in her revenge.

Lia visits Claudia together with Amboy (JK Labajo) who is now her boyfriend. Despite being blind, Claudia is happy that Lia visited her. Belen, Isko (Ronnie Lazaro), and Red (Angelou Alayon) are happy now that justice for Caloy has been served. Amor and Eduardo celebrate as a married couple and Eduardo gives Amor a necklace engraved "Ynamorata" — they are joined with Yna and Angelo who share a moment. The series concludes with Yna and Angelo — and also Amor and Eduardo embracing and eating lunch.

== Cast and characters ==
=== Main cast ===
- Kathryn Bernardo as Yna Macaspac / Maria Amor de Jesus
- Daniel Padilla as Angelo Buenavista
- Jodi Sta. Maria as Amor de Jesus-Powers / Amor de Jesus-Buenavista
- Angelica Panganiban as Madam Claudia Salameda-Buenavista / Greta Barcial
- Ian Veneracion as Eduardo Buenavista

=== Supporting cast ===
- Amy Austria-Ventura as Belen Macaspac
- Ronnie Lazaro as Francisco "Isko" Macaspac
- Andrea Brillantes as Lia Buenavista
- Tirso Cruz III as Gregorio "Greggy" Noble
- JK Labajo as Vincent "Amboy" Mobido
- Joem Bascon as Caloy Macaspac
- Arlene Muhlach as Chef Jen
- Grae Fernandez as Egoy Mobido
- Sue Ramirez as Joy "Ligaya" Miranda
- Diego Loyzaga as David San Luis / David Powers
- Dominic Roque as Mark Delgado
- Bayani Agbayani as Bronson "Kabayan"
- Mickey Ferriols as Monay
- Kristel Fulgar as Ichu Miranda
- Alex Medina as Simon Barcial
- Erika Padilla as Betty Mae Verseles
- Thou Reyes as Takong
- Angelou Alayon as Red Macaspac
- DJ Jhai Ho as Cornelio "Coring"
- Clarence Delgado as Bubwit
- Patrick Sugui as Lloyd Garcia
- Angel Sy as Sophia
- Ayla Mendero as Patty
- Samantha Colet as Zoe
- Kristine Sablan as Daphne
- Christian Lloyd Garcia as Christian
- Rubi Rubi as Irma Marandanan

=== Special guest ===
- Dante Ponce as Christian Cristobal
- Franco Daza as Andrew Garcia
- Emmanuelle Vera as Chelsea
- Helga Krapf as Marga
- Young JV as Tony
- Toby Alejar as Siegfried Garcia
- Maria Isabel Lopez as Isabel Miranda
- Daisy Reyes as Atty. Hazel Santiago
- Matet de Leon as Chef Sam
- Jerome Ponce as Charles Garcia
- Lui Manansala as Zuming
