= Pangako sa 'Yo season 1 =

Pangako sa 'Yo
- Season 1
- Starring: Kathryn Bernardo; Daniel Padilla; Jodi Sta. Maria; Angelica Panganiban; Ian Veneracion
- No. of episodes: 125

Release
- Original network: ABS-CBN
- Original release: May 25 – November 13, 2015

Season chronology
- Next → Season 2

The first season of Pangako sa 'Yo, a Philippine romantic melodrama television series which is a remake of the 2000 television series of the same title on ABS-CBN, premiered on May 25, 2015, on ABS-CBN's Primetime Bida evening block and worldwide on The Filipino Channel and concluded on November 13, 2015, with a total of 125 episodes. Directed by Rory Quintos, Dado Lumibao, and Olivia Lamasan, the series stars Kathryn Bernardo and Daniel Padilla as Yna Macaspac and Angelo Buenavista, together with an ensemble cast consisting of Jodi Sta. Maria, Angelica Panganiban, Ian Veneracion, Amy Austria-Ventura, Ronnie Lazaro, Andrea Brillantes, Diego Loyzaga, Dominic Roque, Bernard Palanca, and Joem Bascon. Jodi Sta. Maria, who portrays Amor Powers, was part of the original 2000 television series and played Lia Buenavista.

== Plot ==
The story begins with Amor (Jodi Sta. Maria), a nursing student whose dream was to become a chef. She was a scholar of Buena Mines, a mining company owned by the Buenavista family, in the town of Punta Verde. To aid her family with expenses, she cooks and sells food to generate income. She frequently sells her food at the Buena Mines corporate offices, where Eduardo (Ian Veneracion), the eldest Buenavista son, works.

Amor confronts Eduardo regarding the mining of her hometown that kills workers and is afraid that more people, including her father, would be casualties. Amor and Eduardo then develop a friendship that turns into romance, much to his younger brother, Diego's (Bernard Palanca), despair. Meanwhile, Doña Benita Buenavista (Pilar Pilapil) refuses to accept Amor and Eduardo's relationship. She forces Eduardo to marry Claudia Salameda (Angelica Panganiban), the illegitimate child of the incumbent governor of Punta Verde for business purposes.

Claudia has lived with her physically impaired mother and was joyous of having to marry Eduardo for a better life, even though she is in love with Simon (Alex Medina). She promises Simon that she will continue seeing him once she is married. Eduardo refuses to marry Claudia, and Diego puts himself forward to marry Claudia instead for the family. Claudia becomes upset and consummates her love with Simon — Eduardo consummates with Amor.

After publicly announcing the engagement of Eduardo and Claudia without knowledge and consent, Amor becomes heartbroken. Diego rushes to her side. He visits her constantly to explain that his brother was not at fault. One day, he picks her up from school and insists that he just wants to comfort her. He becomes drunk, admits that he has always been in love with her and rapes her. Meanwhile, Claudia has followed the two and witnessed the entire scene, not stopping Diego.

Diego is put to prison and is influenced by his mother not to tell Eduardo the truth. Desperate not to be jailed, Diego insists Amor was lying and he did not rape her. Amor goes to Eduardo against her father, Pepe's (Boboy Garovillo), and best friend, Betty Mae's (Erika Padilla), wishes. She asks him if he believes her. Eduardo, hurt by his previous relationship, could not make up his mind. However, during his engagement party, he realized that he could not leave Amor and rushes to her house to beg her to forgive him only to find out that he was too late. The de Jesus family no longer lived there, unknown to him that his mother, Doña Benita, evicted Amor and her family from the town.

Amor learns she is pregnant. She lives a quiet life with her family and daughter named Maria Amor. She leaves Maria Amor to her stepmother, Chayong (Sharmaine Suarez), Pepe, stepbrother Lester (Jess Mendoza), and younger sister Neneth (Kimberly Fulgar), and goes to Hong Kong as a caregiver to fulfill her dream of giving her family a stable life.

The Buenavistas' mining company, now managed by Claudia Buenavista, has been mining in Talimpao, the town where Amor's family now resides. Claudia refuses to listen to the warnings of dangers of the mine and forces the miners to work — causing a landslide to occur. The landslide kills Amor's entire family — except her daughter, Maria Amor, who has been saved by a lowly policeman, Francisco Macaspac (Ronnie Lazaro). She is named "Yna" by the policeman, after noticing the broken necklace she wore — "Yna", originally "Ynamorata", a gift of promise from Eduardo to Amor.

Maria Amor was misidentified by Betty Mae when she saw the dead bodies of Amor's stepmother and her neighbor, Irma's (Rubi Rubi), daughter. She tells Amor that her entire family has died. Amor returns to the Philippines and also to the now-ruined Talimpao, swearing that one day she will avenge all that has happened to her family.

Twenty years later, Maria Amor — now Yna Macaspac (Kathryn Bernardo), is as kindhearted and hard working as her biological mother, Amor. The Macaspac family that adopted her is poor but good mannered.

Eduardo, who is now the governor of Punta Verde, and Claudia have two children: Angelo (Daniel Padilla) and Lia (Andrea Brillantes). Fate brings Yna to Angelo.

Just like her mother, Amor, Yna's passion is cooking. She works a chef in Angelo's restaurant, Casa Corazon. Angelo's restaurant gives Yna scholarship to properly study. Soon Angelo and Yna fall in love — and despite Claudia's attempts to ruin and sabotage Yna — fights for their love together.

Meanwhile, Amor returns to the Philippines from the United States as Amor Powers, a widow of a wealthy but abusive American businessman named James Powers (uncredited). Amor has returned to avenge the death of her family by destroying the Buenavistas, which unwittingly will hurt her own daughter, Yna, in the process. An all-out war begins between Amor Powers and Claudia Buenavista.

== Cast and characters ==
=== Main cast ===
- Kathryn Bernardo as Yna Macaspac / Maria Amor de Jesus
- Daniel Padilla as Angelo Buenavista
- Jodi Sta. Maria as Amor de Jesus-Powers
- Angelica Panganiban as Madam Claudia Salameda-Buenavista
- Ian Veneracion as Eduardo Buenavista

=== Supporting cast ===
- Amy Austria-Ventura as Belen Macaspac
- Ronnie Lazaro as Francisco "Isko" Macaspac
- Andrea Brillantes as Lia Buenavista
- JK Labajo as Vincent "Amboy" Mobido
- Grae Fernandez as Jonathan "Egoy" Mobido
- Diego Loyzaga as David San Luis / David Powers
- Dominic Roque as Mark Delgado
- Carla Martinez as Leonora Villamejia-Salameda
- Bernard Palanca as Anton Diego Buenavista
- Joem Bascon as Caloy Macaspac
- Alex Medina as Simon Barcial
- Jan Marini Pizarras as Lourdes Magbanua / Lourdes Abad
- Sunshine Garcia as Julieta Macaspac
- Erika Padilla as Betty Mae Verseles
- Thou Reyes as Takong
- Niña Dolino as Roma Christie
- Angelou Alayon as Red Macaspac
- Arlene Muhlach as Chef Jennylyn "Jen"
- Lou Veloso as Sous Chef Tony
- Lollie Mara as Yaya Pacita
- Alexander "Alex" Ramirez as Miguel Ramirez
- Pamu Pamorada as Kim
- Vivieka Ravanes as Alta
- DJ Jhai Ho as Cornelio "Coring"
- BJ Forbes as Adam
- Daniel Ombao as Lloyd
- Jeffrey Tam as Gabi
- Manuel "Ku" Aquino as Antonio Macaspac
- Richard Quan as Gov. Theodore "Teddy" Boborol
- Sarah Carlos as Bea Bianca Bejerrano
- Kyline Alcantara as Jessa Boborol
- Rubi Rubi as Irma Marandanan

=== Special guest ===
- Pilar Pilapil as Doña Benita Buenavista
- Sylvia Sanchez as Krystal Toleda
- Boboy Garovillo as Pepe de Jesus
- Sharmaine Suarez as Chayong de Jesus
- Leo Rialp as Gov. Enrique Salameda
- Jong Cuenco as Mr. Castro
- Anna Feo as Sous Chef Linda
- Mimi Orara as Chef Gina
- Jess Mendoza as Lester de Jesus
- Kimberly Fulgar as Neneth de Jesus
- Khalil Ramos as Jasper Bejerrano
- Sandy Andolong as Myrna Santos-de Jesus
- Bubbles Paraiso as Natalie
- Manny Castañeda as Parish Priest
- Odette Khan as Gloria Bejerrano
- Pinky Marquez as Puring Bejerrano
- Cherry Lou as Chef Sheila
