= Partners in Crime (2022 film) =

- Theatrical release poster
- Directed by: Cathy Garcia-Molina
- Screenplay by: Jumbo A. Albano; Daniel S. Saniana
- Story by: Jumbo A. Albano; Joaquin Enrico C. Santos
- Produced by: Kara U. Kintanar; Vanessa R. Valdez; Katherine S. Labeyen
- Starring: Vice Ganda; Ivana Alawi
- Cinematography: Yves R. Jamero
- Edited by: Marya Ignacio
- Music by: Jessie Lasaten
- Production companies: Star Cinema; Viva Films
- Distributed by: ABS-CBN Films
- Release date: December 25, 2022
- Running time: 109 minutes
- Country: Philippines
- Language: Filipino
- Box office: ₱168 million

Partners in Crime is a 2022 Philippine action comedy film starring Vice Ganda and Ivana Alawi. The film is directed by Cathy Garcia-Molina and is under the production of Star Cinema and Viva Films. It was one of the official entries for 2022 Metro Manila Film Festival and was released on December 25, 2022. This was Vice Ganda's first film after a three-year hiatus in cinema since The Mall, The Merrier.

The film is the second highest-grossing Philippine film of 2022 and in MMFF behind Deleter.

== Plot ==
Jack Cayanan is a successful television host of the show "Happy Hour with Jack"; but because of his schedule, he has no time for his family. In an episode, Jack's voice becomes hoarse and his vocal folds are found to be swollen. The doctors tell Jack to rest, but the latter refuses, fearing for his fans. Then, he remembers his family, especially his former partner, Barbara Nicole Rose Albano, whom he met while hosting a Bingo event. Barbara and Jack became hosting partners in every event, calling their team-up as "JaBar". During a beauty pageant, Jack and Barbara were invited to become hosts on television. But, when Jack arrived, it was only he who was chosen as host, leaving Barbara frustrated. There, she broke up with Jack, but he reiterated that they were never in a relationship.

Despite his illness, Jack goes to his show. To his surprise, his former partner comes and renames herself Rose, a known social media influencer. To settle their rivalry, Jack's network decides to have an exclusive interview with Don Bill Libme, the richest man in the Philippines who has survived 99 assassination attempts. After seeing a job ad for servants in Don Bill's 75th birthday, Jack and Rose decide to go so that they can have their interview.

Jack disguises himself with a mole on his left cheek. But Rose comes also with a mole on her right cheek. Kookai, one of Don Bill's maids recognizes Jack and Rose, but Jack asks her not to tell anyone about their identity. Don Bill calls for assistance, prompting Jack and Rose to a chase towards him. They reach Don Bill's room and see him fatally stabbed with a syringe. One of Don Bill's maids Marites sees a confused Rose stabbing Don Bill's corpse with the syringe.

A mysterious caller calls Jack and Rose, showing a spliced footage of Rose stabbing Don Bill. He then blackmails the two, saying he would expose the video if they do not follow his demands. They hang up the phone and call the man again. They find out that when the man answers, Don Bill's children also answer, indicating that one of his children killed him. But the man tells them that he will not expose the video if they bring to him a set of green, blue, and pink coins in an hour, which can be found in the green, blue, and pink rooms. But as the key to the rooms is Don Bill himself, they bring his corpse along.

They first go to the Blue Room but Kookai sees Jack and Rose with Don Bill's corpse. Jack tells Kookai that she can have everything she wants in exchange for her silence. There, Don Bill's hologram tells them that in order to get the Blue Coin, they have to imitate pictures and facial expressions to be flashed to them. If they get the wrong expression three times, the burglar alarm will sound off. During the course of the challenge, Jack explains to Rose that he did not mean to hurt her. The network's management decided to only have Jack in the show. They pass the challenge after Jack imitates Don Bill's facial expression after Rose fails twice and get the Blue Coin.

At the Green Room, two security personnel, who happened to be Maren and Jorge, Jack's friends and confidants, follow them. Jack asks them to take care of Don Bill's children. There they must sing a song and need to score a 100 and avoid reaching zero, which would detonate a bomb. They sing "Salamat" by Yeng Constantino, which happens to be their theme song. Don Bill says that whoever sings first should sing until the last parts. In the last parts, Jack and Rose sing like Jaya, Zsa Zsa Padilla, Kris Aquino, and Regine Velasquez, until they score 100 and get the Green Coin.

While searching for the Pink Coin, the party starts, forcing them to present Don Bill's corpse, which disappears. Jack suspects that the killer took Don Bill to the Pink Room. When they go to the Pink Room, Carlos, the head of security, already has the Pink Coin. Jack and Rose find out that he was the mysterious caller and Don Bill's killer. Now that the coins are complete, they are brought to the vault to place the blue and green coins, but the pink coin is thrown away and Jack and Carlos fight each other. During a chase between Jack, Rose, Carlos, and his men, they are caught by Liezel and Don Bill's children who recognize Jack and Rose.

Carlos tells them that Jack and Rose killed Don Bill, but the two maintain their innocence. With the help of a Ouija board, Marites is possessed by Don Bill's soul. He accuses Jack and Rose of desecrating his corpse but tells everyone it was Carlos who killed him. Carlos had asked Don Bill for money because his mother was in the hospital and was due for surgery, but Don Bill refused to lend him money because he had no money left. There, he showed Carlos all of the weapons used in the 99 assassination attempts against him. He then grabbed a poisoned syringe and was about to stab Carlos, but backfired. When Don Bill called for help, he was fatally stabbed by Carlos with the syringe.

Carlos goes to the secret room and sees a vault. He does not know the combination, forcing him to research other ways of opening the vault, which include the use of green, pink, and blue coins. The vault is found to be empty, indicating that Don Bill was telling the truth and the reason he invited his children was to ask money from them.

Carlos is arrested and Rose encourages Jack to go home to his family and reconcile with them. Jack and his family celebrate his father Bert's birthday. Rose becomes a substitute host for Jack, and both Jack, Rose, and their families celebrate Christmas.

== Cast ==
=== Lead Cast ===
- Vice Ganda as Jack Cayanan
- Ivana Alawi as Barbara Nicole Rose Albano

=== Supporting cast ===
- Enchong Dee as Carlos Jose Salazar
- Rez Cortez as Don Bill Libme
- Al Tantay as Bert Cayanan
- MC Muah Calaquian as Jorge
- Lassy Marquez as Maren
- Divine Tetay as Rhed
- Marnie Lapus as DOMA Lizel Arciaga
- Via Antonio as Kookai

=== Special Parcitipation ===
- Candy Pangilinan as Giging Reynes
- Michael Flores as Hugo Libme
- Eian Rances as Paulo Libme
- Cai Cortez as Amelia Libme
- Amanda Zamora as Betsy Libme
- Zyern Dela Cruz as Basty Libme
- Peewee O'Hara as Lola Baby, Barbara's Grandmother
- Panying as Maritess (Maid)
- Vien King as Theo Cayanan, Jack's Younger Brother
- Chase Romero as Wes Cayanan's wife

=== Guest appearance ===
- Ion Perez as Motorcycle Max (uncredited)

== Production ==
ABS-CBN Film Productions in 2020, announced their planned line-up of films for 2020–21 which includes a film which would star Vice Ganda and Ivana Alawi. The film was planned to be the third installment of the Praybeyt Benjamin film franchise by Wenn V. Deramas. Cathy Garcia-Molina was offered to direct the film with the working title Super Praybeyt Benjamin since Deramas is already deceased. However such film project did not push through.

Another film featuring the tandem would be worked on instead. On July 8, 2022, the Metro Manila Film Festival (MMFF) Executive Committee announced the first four official entries for the 2022 Metro Manila Film Festival which includes Vice Ganda and Ivana Alawi's Partners in Crime. The entries were entered as script submissions. Molina was tapped to direct the film.

In late August 2022, Vice met with the staffs and production team to aid in the artistic creation of the film. The film started the initial production on September 12, 2022 and began filming on September 19, 2022. On September 9, 2022, a story conference was held by the press together with the lead stars Vice and Alawi and director Molina. During the event, Alawi expressed her excitement to work with Vice, whom she and her mother look up to.

=== Release ===
Partners in Crime premiered in cinemas in the Philippines on December 25, 2022 as one of the eight entries of the 2022 Metro Manila Film Festival.

== Reception ==
=== Box office ===
Partners in Crime has reportedly earned ₱31 million on the first day of the Metro Manila film festival, becoming the top-grossing film among the entries. As per unofficial figures obtained by PEP.ph, the film has grossed over ₱86 million as of December 28, 2022. On January 1, 2023 (New Year's Day), the film has reportedly earned ₱168 million.

=== Accolades ===
Awards Ceremony	Title	Recipient	Result	Ref.
48th Gabi Ng Parangal: Metro Manila Film Festival	Best Actress	Ivana Alawi	Nominated	
48th Gabi Ng Parangal: Metro Manila Film Festival	Best Sound	Partners in Crime	Nominated	
