= Roy Veneracion =

Filipino painter (born 1947)

- Born: July 31, 1947 (age 79); Manila, Philippines
- Education: University of Philippines
- Spouse: Susan del Mar Lopez (m. 1970)
- Children: 3, including Ian
- Awards: Cultural Center of the Philippines' 13 Artists Awards for the Visual Arts

Roy Santos Veneracion (Tagalog pronunciation: [bɛnɛɾaˈʃon]; born July 31, 1947) is a Filipino painter whose work explores a wide range of styles, techniques, materials, and subject matter. He is considered one of the leading abstract artists in the Philippines and the precursor of contemporary Aesthetic Syncretism. His work is associated with the Syncretism art movement in the Philippines and abroad.

== Early years ==
Veneracion grew up in Manila, Philippines, which had recently gained independence from the United States on July 4, 1946. This event and the cultural change which followed became early inspirations for his work. He attended elementary school at the Espiritu Santo Parochial School in Santa Cruz, Manila, a Catholic school run by Belgian nuns, where Veneracion earned early recognition for his artistic skills, and was recognized as an art prodigy. He has stated that he has no memory of drawing in the manner of children of his age. As a student, he was frequently tasked with decorating the blackboard on special occasions, creating biological and anatomical illustrations for his science classes, and drawing maps for geography subjects.

His early influence and mentor was his maternal uncle, Bienvenido Santos, who recognized his talent and informally coached him and his older brother on anatomy, proportion, chiaroscuro, linear perspective, and animal drawing. Santos was a former student of Fernando Amorsolo and neo-Classicist Guillermo Tolentino, but he did not continue his artistic pursuits due to serving in World War II as an army officer. Veneracion was later gifted an art book on figure drawing, an oil paintbox, and a boxed set of pastel colors by his uncle as his artistic abilities grew.

As a second-year high school student at the Colegio de San Juan de Letran in Intramuros, Veneracion was awarded the first prize in a student art contest for a satirical ink drawing he did on the subject of a professor and student's classroom interactions. In his third year, Veneracion was commissioned by his older brother's class to make a series of full-body watercolor illustrations of all the characters in José Rizal's novels, Noli Me Tangere and El filibusterismo. He received 35 pesos for each drawing, and the works were displayed along the corridors of the U. E. classrooms where he attended his senior years in high school.

== Family ==
Veneracion's father, Geronimo Veneracion II, was a lawyer, a summa cum laude graduate who passed the National Bar exams and received a Doctorate of Laws degree from the Universidad Central de Madrid during the reign of Francisco Franco. His mother, Aida Santos, was the daughter of Bocaue Mayor Dominador Santos and Pacita Flaviano Santos. His paternal grandparents were school masters: Geronimo Veneracion was the head teacher, and Antonia Ongtengco was the local school's principal. They owned and managed farmlands in San Rafael, Bulacan, acquired from their savings as schoolteachers, and subsequently became rice traders. Veneracion was the second eldest son in a family of four children. His siblings are Geronimo III, Leticia, and Reynaldo. He married Susan del Mar Lopez, a schoolmate from art school, and they have three children: Rachel, Ian, and Mikhail.

== Education and adult life ==
Veneracion pursued a Bachelor of Fine Arts degree at the University of the Philippines College of Fine Arts. He majored in advertising instead of painting due to his parents' concerns about the financial security of an art career. He was popular with his fine arts professors because he performed well academically, and because of his advanced skills in classical media, including oil and watercolor still life painting and drawings of classical sculptures. He was awarded first prize for his illustrations for his editorial design thesis.

In 1970, Veneracion married Susan Lopez, a fashion model and Binibining Pilipinas finalist, and had their first child, Rachel. He found jobs in advertising agencies and worked in the creative department of PhilProm. In 1972, after the declaration of martial law by President Ferdinand Marcos, all news media outlets were closed. Veneracion was not fired, but chose to resign to pursue a career as an artist. His work was soon displayed in group exhibitions at the Galerie Bleue in Makati. In 1974, at the encouragement of some former classmates, Veneracion entered an art contest sponsored by the newly founded Miladay Art Gallery in Makati. He did not win the competition, but was offered a personal exhibition of his work the same year. This exhibition, and others that followed, quickly led to his prominence as an abstract expressionist.

In 1976, Veneracion, along with some former classmates, acquired travel permits to Europe, Canada, and the USA for his exhibition at the Philippine House in Mainz, Germany. During the trip, they visited the Tate, the Louvre, Montmartre, and the Pegal districts, which is said to have increased his artistic exposure and insights. They also visited other Filipino artists living and working in Paris, such as Nena Saguil, and put on multiple exhibitions while in the US. In 1980 and 1981, Veneracion was made artist-in-residence of the Cultural Center of the Philippines (CCP), and was a frequent artist at the CCP Annual Exhibitions organized by museum director Raymundo Albano. During this period, Veneracion developed the style of merging differentiated art principles with abstractions, and his work criticized the upcoming dictatorial regime and the arms race between the USSR and NATO.

In 1986, the Marcos dictatorship was dismantled by the People Power Revolution. Veneracion made a painting symbolically depicting the events, and participated in the revolution with his wife and their children Rachel and Ian, and artist Noberto Carating.

In 1990, Veneracion received the CCP's 13 Artists Award.

Veneracion launched a show titled Syncretism & Beyond in 2005 at the Mag:net+ Gallery in Makati, a gallery which specialized in avant-garde art. The exhibition was well received by critics such as Reuben Ramas Cañete of the University of Philippines, and was later acquired by the Philippine National Museum. Veneracion's Ika-13 Pangitain Ni Juan (lit. '13th Vision of John') collection, an exhibition criticizing dictatorship, was put on permanent display.

== Philosophy and style ==
Veneracion's work in the 1960s was inspired by the liberation of the Philippines, particularly at the University of the Philippines, and the "contradiction between bureaucratic orthodoxy and student radicalism". Much of his work attempts to combine different or opposing elements, such as using Asian-style scrolls and Western-style paintings to explore the dichotomy between the East and the West. Veneracion's work aims to adhere to four main goals, outlined in his written work The Syncretism Manifesto:

- The rejection of dogmatism, fundamentalism, traditionalism, and exclusivity
- The denunciation and rejection of "charlatans" posing as artists and art lovers who influence public opinion into believing that marketability equals artistic excellence
- Debunking a singular, signature style as a means of mass production and easy product recall
- The cultivation of multiple styles, multiple techniques, multimedia, and multiple personalities, in order not to be pigeonholed and trapped in little boxes to be rarefied, classified, or commodified.

His painting style consists of pouring oil paint onto puddles of water on prepared board panels laid flat on the floor, which are tilted to make the mixture flow in various directions creating rainbows of colors that form unpredictable configurations. He is known to use unconventional items during painting, including soil, pebbles, nails, twigs, and print markings of his body.

He has drawn inspiration from artists such as Bobby Chabet, Jose Joya, Virginia Flor-Agbayani, Rod Paras-Perez, and Billy Abueva. Of these mentors, Joya was the closest to Veneracion. His influences were expanded during his time abroad in Japan, Europe, and the USA, where he saw the works of major artists of 1970s and 1980s such as Robert Rauschenberg, Andy Warhol, Sigmar Polke, Eric Fischl, and David Salle. These trips did not include visits to well-known museums (such as the Louvre) but instead to less-visited areas of such as the art studios of Native Americans, Asian Americans, Canadians, and graffiti artists in Los Angeles and New York. Veneracion laid the foundations of his syncretism style through the blending of the different cultures and art styles he had witnessed, including his own local context and lived experience.

The aesthetic patterns in his work are a blend of abstract washes, gestural strokes, and figurative re-renderings in paint of stock images from photography and pop culture. On one hand, they coexist on the picture plane formally, either as ground-figure relationships (as in Three Graces and Independence Day–So What Have We Done) or as key block elements that subdivide the work into zones of abstract-figure contrast (as in What About Our Children or Antique Store Cards Create Nostalgia). At another level, they also signify the subtle social and cultural differences between subjects within a general figure-ground composition. Maria Clara and the Natives, The Musicians or Perseus and the Igorots explore this more nuanced narration of social and cultural disjuncture, where the oppressive impact of Western colonization and imperialism in the Philippine experience is both felt and resisted both by the colonized as well as the colonizer, resulting in parodies of conflicting images immersed in acid baths of modernist color-fields. In addition, the themes of lost nature and imperiling globalization are seen in works like Holy Macaque or Heir to the Ages, with its air of environmental catastrophe looming over the horizon, a disaster traceable to the unsustainable industrial consumerism that global capitalism has unleashed upon late modern life and material relations.

The last theme, which Veneracion also focused on in his 2008 Syncretism series, is joined by abstract works (abstract in the sense that they utilize non-objectivist visualities in painting) that combine both fluid color washes (of the style associated with Louis Morris) with thick textured, nervously-drawn gestural strokes (like Sam Frances as loosened up by graffiti art) but combined in a visual montage of bright colors and sensual forms verging on an erotic description intermingled with the materiality of daily life. This is then re-interpreted into the artist's vision of nature and human experience, becoming palimpsests wherein the viewer (from the artist's perspective) occupies surrealistic dreams of wonder and regret (for example Catching Clouds in Polychrome, Seen and Unseen, and Dawn Dispersed the Night), narrate ironic meta-commentaries of elitist consumerism (Corporate Chic or Subliminal Abstract), or a poetic return from civilizational or patriarchal hypocrisy towards a non-judgmental nature that is motherly and nurturing (Fragile Blue Sky). The key to understanding these double-coded works is Veneracion's invocation of pareidolia, or the human mind's ability to recognize patterns from otherwise random forms. The hallucinatory effect of dreams and mirages is also evoked, with coded symbols with ambiguous meaning.

The role of an artist as conceptualizer of ideas coupled with the revolutionary nature of an avant-garde practitioner who sees the virtues of both the ideal and the unified are signified in the forms that Veneracion deploys through a combination of approaches and perspectives. Analyzing his position in the painting The Painter, Veneracion summarizes syncretism as "an omnivore's passion for the textural integrity of disparate elements in (philosophical) diets and (kinesthetic) desires, one that simultaneously expands away from the limitations of rote traditionalism to encompass a world of gestures and ideas ... that is ideal, whole, and free."

== Exhibitions ==
=== Solo exhibitions ===
- 2016 Finding Without Seeking, Altromondo Arte Contemporaneo, Makati
- 2013 Roy Veneracion – Syncre Art, NCCA Gallery, Intramuros, Manila
- 2011 The Essentiality of Polystyle Syncretism to a Multiple Personality Artist in the 21st Century, Nova Gallery, Makati
- 2009 Syncretism – Roy Veneracion, Jack Miller & Associates Gallery, Los Angeles, USA
- 2008 Syncretism – Roy Veneracion, Union Center for the Arts, Los Angeles, USA
- 2005 Syncretism & Beyond, Mag:net+Gallery, Makati
- 2004 Chakras – The Region of Power, West Gallery, Makati
- 2002 Galleria Duemila, Mandaluyong
- 2002 Mag:net+The Loop, ELJ Center, Quezon City
- 2000 Superimpose, West Gallery, Makati
- 1995 Solar Drive, Hollywood Hills, USA
- 1994 To Your Unconscious, Galleria Duemila, Mandaluyong
- 1991 Random Explorations, Brix Gallery, Makati
- 1991 Painted Objects, Alliance Francaise, Makati
- 1989 Mural project, Ito na nga ang Paraiso ni Juan Tranquilino (lit. 'This is the Paradise of Juan Tranquilino'), CCP, Manila
- 1987 Luzviminda, Finale Art File, Makati
- 1986 Skitzo, Penguin Cafe and Gallery, Malate, Manila
- 1983 CCP Small Gallery, CCP, Manila
- 1982 Fifth One-Man-Show, Gallerie Bleue, Makati
- 1981 Hiraya Gallery, Ermita, Manila
- 1975 Philippine Art Center, Makati
- 1974 1st One-Man-Show, Miladay Art Center, Makati

=== Group exhibitions ===
- 2016 Abstract Art, Finale Art File, Makati
- 2014 Sampo't Isang Daliri (lit. 'Ten and One Fingers'), Galeria Astra, Makati
- 2012 Manilart, XMX Center, Pasay
- 2009 Kwatro Kantos, Sining Kamalig, Quezon City
- 2008 Jack Miller & Associates Gallery, Los Angeles, USA
- 2007 Peers Ensemble, Pinto Gallery, Antipolo
- 2006 3-Man Show – Roy, Ian & Mikhail, Mag:net+Gallery, ELJ Center, Quezon City
- 2004 Forum For Four, Art Forum, Singapore City
- 2002 17th Asian International Art Exhibition, Daejeon Municipal Museum, Daejeon, South Korea
- 2001 Heck Final, City Gallery, Los Angeles, USA
- 2000 Transmodern Transgressions, 3 Artist Show – Roy, Ian, and Chati, CCP, Manila
- 1999 14th Asian International Art Exhibition, Fukuoka Asian Art Museum, Fukuoka, Japan
- 1999 Labintatlo (lit. 'Thirteen'), CCP Main Gallery, Manila
- 1998 Eros, Crucible Gallery, Mandaluyong
- 1997 Modern Art, Art Center, Mandaluyong
- 1996 Unbounded, Australian Center, Makati
- 1992 Asian International Art Exhibition, Indonesia
- 1991 Dangerous But Ordained, University of the Philippines, Quezon City
- 1990 CCP Award for Visual Arts, 13 Artists Awards, CCP Main Gallery, Manila
- 1989 Segunda Bienal de la Havana, Wifredo Lam Center, Havana, Cuba
- 1988 2nd Asia-Pacific Arts Festival, Club Med, Cherating, Malaysia
- 1986 Bagkus-Bugkus (Because We're Together), Metropolitan Museum of Manila
- 1986 Piglas (Break Free), CCP Main Gallery, Manila
- 1985 2nd Asian Art Festival, Fukuoka Museum, Fukuoka, Japan
- 1984 A Roadshow Exhibition, China
- 1983 Siteworks II, University of the Philippines Los Baños, Laguna
- 1981 ASEAN Traveling Exhibition, ASEAN countries
- 1980–1988 CCP Annual Exhibitions for the Visual Arts, CCP, Manila
- 1980 Seven Filipino Artists, Philippine House, San Francisco, USA
- 1979 Museum Artists, 1979, MOPA, Manila
- 1978 Sepia Workshop, Soho, New York City, USA
- 1978 Insights Into Philippine Contemporary Art, IMF Building, Washington D.C., USA
- 1977 Canadian National Exposition, Toronto, Canada
- 1977 Amerasian Center, Washington, D.C., USA
- 1976 Mullen Hall, Catholic University of America, Washington, D.C., USA
- 1976 Four Filipino Artists, Oxon County Library, Alexandria, Virginia, USA
- 1976 Five Filipino Artists, Philippine House, Mainz, Germany
- 1976 Kontiki, Kowloon, Hong Kong
- 1973 Mini-Maxi Exhibition, Gallerie Bleue, Makati

== Awards ==
- 1990 Cultural Center of the Philippines – 13 Artists Awards
- 1982 Art Association of the Philippines – Recognition of Excellence in the Arts Award
- 1968 1st Prize Award, College Thesis, Editorial Design – University of the Philippines College of Fine Arts
- 1960 1st Prize, Student's Art Contest – San Juan de Letran College

=== Residencies ===
1983–1984 Cultural Center of the Philippines Artist in Residence – conducted creative workshops for the arts

== Sources ==
- Canete, Reuben Ramas. Art and its Context, essays, reviews, and interviews on Philippine Art. University of Santo Tomas Publishing House, c. 2012.
- The National Museum Visual Arts Collection. National Museum of the Philippines Executive House, Padre, Manila, c. 1991.
- Art Philippines. The Crucible Workshop, c. 1992.
- National Commission for Culture and Arts Gallery presents: Roy Veneracion-Syncre Art 2013, www.ncca.gov.ph
- Uy, Hannah Jo. Zulueta, Pinggot. Unexplored Terrain. Manila Bulletin. May 2, 2016.
- Canete, Reuben Ramas. Finding Without Seeking. The Philippine Star. May 2, 2016.
- Reyes, Cid. Roy Veneracion Opens Up to the World. Philippine Daily Inquirer. May 23, 2016.
