= 2022 Metro Manila Film Festival =

Annual Philippine film festival

2022 Metro Manila Film Festival 48th Metro Manila Film Festival
- No. of films: 8
- Festival date: December 25, 2022 to January 7, 2023

MMFF chronology
- 49th ed. 47th ed.

The 2022 Metro Manila Film Festival (MMFF) is the 48th edition of the annual Metro Manila Film Festival held in Metro Manila and throughout the Philippines. It is being organized by the Metropolitan Manila Development Authority (MMDA). During the festival, no foreign films are shown in Philippine theaters (excluding IMAX and 4D theaters).

== Entries ==
=== Feature films ===
The following was the criteria used in determining the final 8 entries:
1. Artistic excellence (40.0%)
2. Commercial appeal (40.0%)
3. Filipino cultural sensibility (10.0%)
4. Global appeal (10.0%)

The Metro Manila Film Festival (MMFF) Executive Committee announced the first four official entries in July 2022 which were entered as script submissions. The last four entries was announced after the submission period for finished films ended on September 30, 2022.

On October 20, 2022, the last four films was announced by MMFF Executive Committee. These four additional films are finished films selected within the record high of 22 films that were submitted. Now on its 48th edition, this year theme is "Balik Saya sa MMFF 2022".

Title	Starring	Production company	Director/s	Genre
First batch
Labyu with an Accent	Coco Martin, Jodi Sta. Maria	ABS-CBN Film Productions and CCM Creatives	Rodel Nacianceno	Romance, Comedy
Nanahimik ang Gabi	Ian Veneracion, Heaven Peralejo, Mon Confiado	Rein Entertainment Philippines	Shugo Praico	Horror, Thriller, Action
Partners in Crime	Vice Ganda, Ivana Alawi	ABS-CBN Film Productions and Viva Films	Cathy Garcia-Molina	Action, Comedy
My Teacher	Toni Gonzaga, Joey de Leon	TEN17P, DepEd Entertainment and APT Entertainment	Paul Soriano	Drama, Family
Second batch
Deleter	Nadine Lustre, Louise delos Reyes, McCoy de Leon, Jeffrey Hidalgo	Viva Films	Mikhail Red	Techno-horror, Psychological thriller
Family Matters	Noel Trinidad, Liza Lorena	Cineko Productions, Inc.	Nuel Naval	Drama, Family
Mamasapano: Now It Can Be Told	Edu Manzano, Aljur Abrenica, Paolo Gumabao	Borracho Film Production and Viva Films	Lester Dimaranan	Action, Drama
My Father, Myself	Dimples Romana, Sean de Guzman, Jake Cuenca	3:16 Media Network and Regal Entertainment	Joel Lamangan	Drama

== Parade of Stars ==
2022 Parade of Stars route
- Parade route map from the Metropolitan Manila Development Authority

The Parade of Stars, the traditional motorcade of floats featuring the eight official entries, for the 2022 MMFF was held in Quezon City on December 21, 2022. The route traversed Quezon Avenue from Welcome Rotonda to the Quezon Memorial Circle. The route is 7.36 kilometers (4.57 mi) long. The parade ended on Quezon Memorial Circle.

== Awards ==
2022 Metro Manila Film Festival Gabi ng Parangal
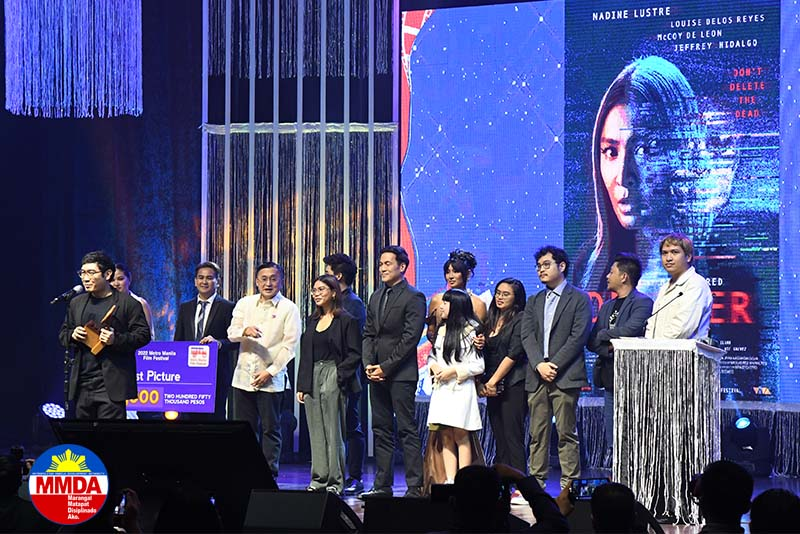
- Date: December 27, 2022
- Site: New Frontier Theater, Quezon City
- Hosted by: Giselle Sanchez, Cindy Miranda, and BB Gandanghari

Highlights
- Best Picture: Deleter
- Best Director: Mikhail Red (Deleter)
- Best Actor: Ian Veneracion (Nanahimik ang Gabi)
- Best Actress: Nadine Lustre (Deleter)
- Most awards: Deleter (7)

Television coverage
- Channel: One PH
- Network: TV5

The Gabi ng Parangal (transl. Awards Night) of the 2022 Metro Manila Film Festival was held at the New Frontier Theater in Quezon City on December 27, 2022.

Viva Live was the producer of the program which was hosted by Giselle Sanchez, Cindy Miranda, and BB Gandanghari.

The criteria for judging was based on a definition by Eddie Romero, National Artist for film. Jurors underwent a secret vote but were briefed on the Romero criteria and the MMFF Executive Committee tallied the votes.

The board of jurors include: Laurice Guillen (head), Jose Arturo Garcia (cochair), Tirso Cruz III (Film Development Council of the Philippines chair), Dan Fernandez, Raquel Villavicencio, Ino Manalo, Alex Cortez, Noah Tonga, Victor Pablo Trinidad and Lucky Blanco.

=== Major awards ===
Winners are listed first, highlighted in boldface, and indicated with a double dagger (‡). Nominations are also listed if applicable.

Best Picture	Best Director
**Deleter – Pelikula Red, Top Story**‡; Mamasapano: Now It Can Be Told – Borracho Film Productions (2nd Best Picture); Nanahimik ang Gabi – Rein Entertainment (3rd Best Picture)	**Mikhail Red – Deleter**‡; Shugo Praico – Nanahimik ang Gabi; Lester Dimaranan – Mamasapano: Now It Can Be Told; Joel Lamangan – My Father, Myself; Paul Soriano – My Teacher
Best Actor	Best Actress
**Ian Veneracion – Nanahimik ang Gabi**‡; Jake Cuenca – My Father, Myself; Noel Trinidad – Family Matters	**Nadine Lustre – Deleter**‡; Ivana Alawi – Partners in Crime; Toni Gonzaga – My Teacher; Heaven Peralejo – Nanahimik ang Gabi
Best Supporting Actor	Best Supporting Actress
**Mon Confiado – Nanahimik ang Gabi**‡; Nonie Buencamino – Family Matters; Sean de Guzman – My Father, Myself	**Dimples Romana – My Father, Myself**‡; Tiffany Grey – My Father, Myself; Louise delos Reyes – Deleter
Best Screenplay	Best Cinematography
**Eric Ramos – Mamasapano: Now It Can Be Told**‡; Shugo Praico – Nanahimik ang Gabi; Toni Gonzaga – My Teacher; Quinn Carillo – My Father, Myself	**Ian Guevarra – Deleter**‡; Mo Zee – Nanahimik ang Gabi; Paolo Emmanuel Magsino – Mamasapano: Now It Can Be Told; TM Malones – My Father, Myself
Best Production Design	Best Editing
**Mariel Hizon – Nanahimik ang Gabi**‡; Ericson Navarro – Mamasapano: Now It Can Be Told; Marc Jayson Jose – Deleter	**Nikolas Red – Deleter**‡; Paolo Emmanuel Magsino – Mamasapano: Now It Can Be Told; Mo Zee – Nanahimik ang Gabi
Best Sound	Best Original Theme Song
**Deleter**‡; Mamasapano: Now It Can Be Told; Nanahimik ang Gabi; Partners in Crime	**"Aking Mahal" from Mamasapano: Now It Can Be Told – by Ferdinand Topacio and Cristy Fermin**‡; Labyu with an Accent; Family Matters; Sandal Ka Lang from My Teacher – by Cesar Francis Concio
Best Musical Score	Best Visual Effects
**Greg Rodriguez III – Nanahimik ang Gabi**‡; Riki Gonzales – Mamasapano: Now It Can Be Told; Cesar Francis Concio – Family Matters; Myka Magsaysay-Sigua and Paul Sigua – Deleter	**Gaspar Mangalin – Deleter**‡; Nanahimik ang Gabi; Mamasapano: Now It Can Be Told
Best Child Performer	Gatpuno Antonio J. Villegas Cultural Award
**Shawn Niño Gabriel – My Father, Myself**‡	**Family Matters**‡
Fernando Poe Jr. Memorial Award for Excellence	Best Float
**Mamasapano: Now It Can Be Told**‡	**My Father, Myself**‡
Special Jury Prize	Gender Sensitivity Award
**Mamasapano: Now It Can Be Told**‡	**My Teacher**‡; Nanahimik ang Gabi; Deleter; Family Matters

=== Other awards ===
- Manay Ichu Vera-Perez Maceda Memorial Award – Vilma Santos
- Phoenix Stars of the Night – Ian Veneracion and Nadine Lustre

=== Multiple awards ===
Awards	Film
7	Deleter
5	Nanahimik ang Gabi
5	Mamasapano: Now It Can Be Told
3	My Father, Myself

=== Multiple nominations ===
Nominations	Film
13	Nanahimik ang Gabi
12	Mamasapano: Now It Can Be Told
11	Deleter
10	My Father, Myself
6	Family Matters
4	My Teacher
2	Partners in Crime

== Box office gross ==
MMDA Chairman Atty. Romando Artes stated that the eight entries of 2022 Metro Manila Film Festival reaches a combined box office gross of ₱500 million during the official run of the film festival, with the actual box office gross figure deemed "acceptable in the industry practice". The top four grossing films in alphabetical order was also released namely: Deleter, Family Matters, Labyu with an Accent, and Partners in Crime. He added that the inaugural edition of Metro Manila Summer Film Festival starting April 8, 2023.

Preceded by 2021 Metro Manila Film Festival	Metro Manila Film Festival; 2022	Succeeded by 2023 Metro Manila Film Festival
