= Ngayon Kaya =

- Official release poster
- Directed by: Prime Cruz
- Written by: Jen Chuaunsu
- Produced by: Paulo Avelino; Petersen Vargas
- Starring: Paulo Avelino; Janine Gutierrez
- Cinematography: Carlos Mauricio
- Edited by: Benjamin Tolentino
- Music by: Len Calvo
- Production companies: T.Rex Entertainment; WASD Films
- Release date: June 22, 2022
- Running time: 1 hour 40 minutes
- Country: Philippines
- Language: Filipino

Ngayon Kaya (Maybe Today) is a 2022 Filipino romance drama film directed by Prime Cruz and starring Paulo Avelino and Janine Gutierrez under production company T.Rex Entertainment and WASD Films. The film was released on June 22, 2022. The production of this film took place between September 2019 to January 2020 before the Coronavirus Pandemic occurred. It was originally set to be released in April 2020 for the Metro Manila Summer Film Festival but was moved to an April 21, 2022 release. This release of the film was once again postponed before it finally hit theaters on June 22, 2022.

The film was made available for streaming on Netflix in November 2022.

== Plot ==
Five years after going their separate ways, close friends Harold and AM unexpectedly reunite after arriving late at the wedding of their friends, Justin and Charmaigne. Old feelings resurface as the two reflect on their almost decade-long friendship, pretend to live the lives taken away by their clashing dreams and obligations, and lament their many "what could have beens." Will they get it right this time around, or will they have to go on wondering what life would've been like if they didn't let their chance pass them by a second time?

== Cast and characters ==
- Paulo Avelino as Harold Coquia
- Janine Gutierrez as Amihan "AM" Fernandez
- Alwyn Uytingco as Justin
- John James Uy as Jet
- Donna Cariaga as Charmaigne
- Rio Locsin as Espie
- Joel Ferrer as Angcoy
- Agung Bagus as Brian
- Juan Miguel Severo as Motmot
- Shara Dizon as Grace
- Kych Minemoto as Mikel
- Iana Bernardez as Anastasia
- John Timmons as Arric
- Samantha Lee as Nix
- Brian Sy as Red
- Gabby Padilla as Nina
- Adrianna So as Issa
- VJ Mendoza as William
- Via Antonio as DJ Natasha
- Boo Ganunada as AM's Friend
- Nestor Abrogena as Customer
- Yuna Chanel Tangog as Young Girl
- Marxie Madlen Fadul
- Shannel Fama
- Ranty Portento
- Mayonnaise
- Ang Bandang Shirley
- Typecast
