= Pinggot Zulueta =

Filipino visual artist and photojournalist

- Born: Jose Vinluan Zulueta; 19 June 1961 (age 64)
- Education: University of Santo Tomas; UP College of Fine Arts
- Known for: Painting, Photography
- Website: pinggotzulueta.blogspot.com

Pinggot Zulueta (born 19 June 1961) is a Filipino visual artist and photojournalist.

== Biography ==
Zulueta grew up in Tarlac, Philippines and attained his Fine Arts degree in Painting from the University of Santo Tomas, where he served as staff artist for The Varsitarian. He then continued his studies at the UP College of Fine Arts. He also attended an advanced course on news photography and pictorial layout conducted by Berlin's International Institute for Journalism during its visit to Manila in 1996. He later worked as a political cartoonist for Midweek Magazine and Abante. He has also been a lifestyle photographer for both Diyaryo Filipino and Manila Bulletin.

Zulueta's art style centers on social commentary and abstraction. Since 1983, his work has been exhibited in the Philippines, New Zealand, Australia, and the United States. He has also appeared in EDSA 2: A Nation in Revolt and collaborated on the UNESCO children's book Mga Alagad ng Mahiwagang Sirkulo.

== Selected exhibitions ==
- Solo exhibitions:
  - 1985, April: TILAMSIK at Silahis International Hotel, Manila, Philippines
  - 2002, September: ASINTA: Images and Imageries at RCBC Plaza Main Lobby, Makati, Philippines
  - 2005, December: AOTEAROA SERIES at Philippine Center, New York City, USA
  - 2013, March: VIAJES at Galeria Francesca in the SM Megamall, Mandaluyong, Philippines
  - 2013, November: MAKATULOG KA PA KAYA? (in collaboration with Virgilio Almario) at Crucible Gallery in the SM Megamall, Mandaluyong, Philippines
- Group exhibitions:
  - 1983, April: NTRODUCTIONS ’ 83 at the Cultural Center of the Philippines, Manila, Philippines
  - 1983, September: WALANG PAMAGAT at the University of the Philippines, Philippines
  - 1984, March: LINE DRAWINGS at the UP Vargas Museum, Manila, Philippines
  - 1997, August: ART ASSOCIATION OF THE PHILIPPINES Annual Exhibition at the GSIS Museo ng Sining, Pasay, Philippines
  - 2001, February: POWER OF THE PEOPLE Through the Eyes of Filipino Photojournalists at Robinsons Galleria, Manila, Philippines
  - 2003, August: ON ARRIVAL at the Bashford Gallery, Auckland City, New Zealand
  - 2007, December: SMASH HITS at Parramatta Artists Studios, Sydney, Australia
  - 2008, January: AMNESTY INTERNATIONAL FREEDOM ART EXHIBITION at Tap Gallery, Sydney, Australia
  - 2011, January BRUSHSTROKES TOWARDS 400 at University of Santo Tomas, Manila, Philippines
  - 2012, April: KRISTO MANILA 2012, SO BE IT at Gallery Nine in the SM Megamall, Mandaluyong, Philippines
  - 2012, September: PAPELISMO: Works on Paper at the Crucible Gallery in the SM Megamall, Mandaluyong, Philippines
  - 2012, September: RECOLLECTIONS 1081 at Liongoren Gallery, Quezon City, Philippines
  - 2012, October: MANILART 12 at Galeria Francesca in the SMX Convention Center, Pasay, Philippines
  - 2013: ART FILIPINO: Works by Filipino Artists at the Asian Arts Gallery, Maryland, USA

== Awards ==
Year	Award	Competition	Issuing body	Ref
1979	Second Prize	Sculpture Competition, Annual Students’ Art Competition	University of Santo Tomas College of Fine Arts and Design	
1980	Third Prize	Landscape Painting Competition, Golden Anniversary	University of Santo Tomas College of Fine Arts and Design	
1997	First Prize	Willy Vicoy Photojournalism Awards	News Photographers Association of the Philippines	
1997	First Prize, Bay in Distress, Nature and Environment Category	Willy Vicoy Photojournalism Awards	News Photographers Association of the Philippines	
1997	Third Prize, Coherence, Nature and Environment Category	Willy Vicoy Photojournalism Awards	News Photographers Association of the Philippines	
2008	Special Award	Evicted Filipino Families Photo Competition	Institute for Housing and Urban Development Studies, Rotterdam, Netherlands	
