= My Father, Myself =

2022 Philippine drama film directed by Joel Lamangan

- Theatrical release poster
- Directed by: Joel Lamangan
- Written by: Quinn Carrillo
- Starring: Dimples Romana; Sean de Guzman; Jake Cuenca
- Production companies: 3:16 Media Network; Mentorique Production
- Distributed by: Solar Pictures
- Release date: December 25, 2022
- Country: Philippines
- Language: Filipino
- Box office: ₱1.5 million

My Father, Myself is a 2022 Philippine drama film directed by Joel Lamangan and starring Dimples Romana, Sean de Guzman and Jake Cuenca.

== Premise ==
Robert (Jake Cuenca) is a wealthy civil rights lawyer who lives with his wife Amanda (Dimples Romana) and daughter Mica (Tiffany Grey). When Robert's friend Domeng (Allan Paule) gets murdered, Robert adopts his son Matthew (Sean de Guzman). Following Robert's footsteps, both Mica and Matthew became lawyers when they grew up. Mica reveals to her mother that she is in love with Matthew. Amanda, initially surprised, seeing that they both grew up in the same house as siblings, but she said that she supports Mica.

While studying for the bar exams together, Mica reveals her feelings to Matthew, who initially rebuffs her but they eventually slept together. However, Matthew is still not comfortable sharing their relationship in public. One night, when Robert and Matthew were talking about how much they miss Domeng, Robert remarks how much Matthew looks like his father. Matthew then shocks Robert by kissing him, but Robert pushes him away.

After passing the bar, Robert hires Matthew at his law firm. One night when the two are alone at the office, Matthew tries pursuing Robert again and telling him he loves him. Robert tells Matthew that he's not gay, but Matthew reveals that he once saw Robert and Domeng kissing when he was young. Robert and Matthew then kiss and end up sleeping together. After their hookup, Matthew asks Robert how they should proceed with their relationship and whether he should break up with Mica, but Robert says that he doesn't want to hurt his daughter and they need to keep their relationship a secret, then wait until Mica falls out of love with him. He also says that he can't leave Amanda either since his wealth came from her family.

Meanwhile, Mica reveals to her mother that she is pregnant. When Robert and Matthew knew, Robert is disgusted and physically attacks Matthew. Amanda breaks up the fight and suggests that Mica and Matthew should get married. When Robert objects by saying that the two are essentially siblings, Amanda says everyone knows Matthew is adopted and they can say that their marriage was arranged since childhood.

At Domeng's grave, Robert and Matthew kiss and are caught by Mica. Disgusted, she slaps Matthew and demands that he either pick her or her father. Meanwhile, Amanda is equally disgusted but says that no one can find out, and they need to keep it within their family. However, Robert says that he's tired of living a lie. Matthew tells Robert that he picked Mica and their unborn child. Robert, heartbroken, says that he would have picked Matthew over his family, had he decided to pick him too. He then takes his own life. After the funeral, Matthew and Mica start their new life as a couple.

== Cast ==
- Jake Cuenca as Robert, a human rights lawyer who is a closeted gay man married to a woman
- Dimples Romana as Amanda, Robert's wife
- Sean de Guzman as Matthew, Robert's adopted son
- Allan Paule as Domeng, a peasant leader who was Robert's former friend and lover
- Tiffany Grey as Mica, Robert's daughter

== Production ==
Described as a "boy's love" (BL) film, My Father, Myself was produced under Mentorque Entertainment and 3:16 Media Network. It has Joel Lamangan as its director and Quinn Carrillo as its writer. Lamangan is also the director of two other LGBT-related films, Rainbow's Sunset and Isa Pang Bahaghari. Principal photography began in July 2022.

On concerns raised that the film might have a negative impact on the LGBT+ community following the release of the trailer, Lamangan address this by saying that he based the film on a real story that happened in his province, adding that not all gay stories should be positive or else that would be "unrealistic" or "romanticism". He had to change the ending, since the story he based the film on was "tragic". Nevertheless, he insist he tackled he sensitive theme in a pleasant way, and believed that there is a good lesson audience could derive from the film. There are no sexual acts or frontal nudity depicted in the film, although there is a kissing scene between Cuenca and de Guzman's characters.

== Release ==
My Father, Myself premiered in cinemas in the Philippines on December 25, 2022, as one of the official eight entries of the 2022 Metro Manila Film Festival. It was given a R-18 rating by the Movie and Television Review and Classification Board. Director Lamangan sought for the film to be rated R-16, but was unsuccessful. Lamangan said that the R-18 rating was due to the film's incestuous themes and it being a serious LGBT film rather than a comedic LGBT film.

== Awards and nominations ==
Year	Award-giving body	Category	Nominated Work	Result
2022	2022 Metro Manila Film Festival	Best Supporting Actress	Dimples Romana	Won
2022	2022 Metro Manila Film Festival	Best Child Performer	Shawn Niño Gabriel	Won
