= My Teacher (2022 film) =

2022 Philippine comedy drama film

- Theatrical release poster
- Directed by: Paul Soriano
- Written by: Juvy Galamiton
- Story by: Toni Gonzaga
- Produced by: Paul Soriano; Mark Victor
- Starring: Toni Gonzaga; Joey de Leon
- Cinematography: Odyssey Flores
- Edited by: Mark Victor
- Music by: Francis Concio
- Production companies: Ten17P; Tincan Productions; DepEd Entertainment; APT Entertainment (uncredited)
- Distributed by: Black Cap Pictures; GMA Pictures
- Release date: December 25, 2022
- Country: Philippines
- Language: Filipino
- Box office: ₱12 million

My Teacher is 2022 Philippine comedy drama film directed by Paul Soriano, starring Toni Gonzaga and Joey de Leon. Produced by Ten17P, Tincan Productions and DepEd Entertainment, and distributed by GMA Pictures, it serves as an official entry to the 2022 Metro Manila Film Festival and was released in cinemas nationwide on December 25, 2022.

The film is streaming online on YouTube exclusively on GMA Pictures Official YouTube Channel for free.

== Plot ==
In New Zealand, recently fired teacher Emma finds trouble landing a new job after she failed a student from her previous class who happens to be the child of one of the board of directors of the school.

Emma is forced to return to the Philippines after being encouraged by her childhood best friend and fellow teacher Golda. Emma finds a job as new adviser of a high school senior class, notorious to the school as a bunch of misfits on the brink of failing. One of her students is an older man in his seventies, Solomon, who recognizes Emma as the daughter of his best friend Manuel, who died years prior. Emma is revealed to have lost connection with her father due to his abusive behavior caused by alcoholism and felt abandoned after the eventual death of her mother. Unbeknownst to Emma, Solomon's daughter Weng, who lives in the United States, is also estranged towards him for the same reason. Solomon explains that he decided to go back to school in an attempt to regain the trust and respect of his daughter. Emma remains aloof on Solomon due to her hatred towards her father, as Solomon reminds her of him.

At first, Emma has difficulty earning the respect of her students. She does her best to educate them, and overtime, she is able to establish rapport with the teens by providing encouragement as they traverse their problematic lives, all with the help of Solomon's wisdom. Emma recognizes the academic prowess of her student Erica, she helps class jock Francis land a basketball scholarship, she encourages breadwinner and working student Axel to continue her studies after an attempt to quit school to earn more money, she guides and supports the secret relationship of Jude and Ace, and she teaches mean student Maureen about the importance of respecting her classmates.

One day, Ms. Love eavesdrops and reports Emma's conversation with Jude to the school principal, Mrs. Mission, for allegedly tampering with the students' grades, as this is the first time the students have excelled in their academic endeavors. To avoid unnecessary investigation of students who could potentially derail their progress, Emma falsely admits fault. Emma confides to Solomon about her uncertain future as a teacher and eventually forms a fatherly bond with him. At the day of final exams, it was proven that the students' success were a result of their determination and guidance from Emma and that their grades have not been tampered with. The students form a rally in front of the school to show their support and appreciation to Emma. Mrs. Mission realizes that Emma is an asset of the school, is special to the students, and keeps her as part of the faculty.

The students graduate high school and Solomon delivers a heartfelt speech. Emma narrates the importance of forgiveness, and realizes that because of Solomon and her students, she learned to be at peace with her father's wrongdoings when he was alive. Emma accepts that Solomon was actually the teacher she never expected to have.

== Cast ==
=== Main Cast ===
- Toni Gonzaga as Emma
- Joey de Leon as Solomon
- Ronnie Alonte as Francis
- Loisa Andalio as Erica
- Carmi Martin as Mrs. Mission
- Kakai Bautista as Ms. Love
- Rufa Mae Quinto as Golda
- Isaiah dela Cruz as Ace
- Kych Minemoto as Jude
- Hannah Arguelles as Axel
- Pauline Mendoza as Maureen
- Tom Doromal as Kurt
- Richie Albarida as Dodong
- Jackie Lou Blanco as Weng
- William Lorenzo as Manuel
- Mickey Ferriols as Belinda
- Alessandra Malonzo as teenage Emma
- Valerie Talion as young Emma
- Desiree Calope as Max
- Alex Gonzaga as a tricycle driver
- Jerry Codiñera as Mr. Ladera
- Jaycee Domincel as Albert Lim
- Evelyn Santos as Melissa Subang
- Raul Montessa as Axel's father

== Production ==
The working title of the film was The Teacher. Paul Soriano directed the film, with the story being written by his wife and co-star Toni Gonzaga. She wanted to produce a film tackling about teachers, using The Intern Blind Side as inspiration for My Teacher. They also looked into stories of senior citizens returning back to school for the film's concept. Gonzaga has previously featured an elder who was a high school drop-out continuing their studies in her talk show Toni Talks. The team wanted to explore on how an elderly person in school dealing with their younger classmates who are more tech-savvy. Production also had to deal with constraints caused by the COVID-19 pandemic.

== Release ==
My Teacher was released in the Philippines on December 25, 2022 as one of the eight entries in the 2022 Metro Manila Film Festival. On December 11, 2024, GMA Pictures executive and producer announces that this film will be released on GMA Pictures YouTube Channel as the film is one of the libraries under GMA Pictures movie distribution.

== Reception ==
The film, as described by BusinessWorld, "drags on and on — some kilig dialogue, tearjerker moments, and inspiring soliloquies litter the narrative all until its very end." PelikulaMania.com was disappointed with the film as it "touches [only] on certain issues like the unfair treatment of both the students and the teachers from people with authority, [but] lacks the substance in exploring the issues of why someone is taking his high school years as a senior citizen... The film is considered a box office bomb and is considered Gonzaga's lowest-grossing film after The Exorsis."

== Accolades ==
Award	Ceremony Date	Category	Recipient(s)	Result	Ref.
48th MMFF 2022 Gabi ng Parangal	December 27, 2022	Gender Sensitivity	My Teacher	Won	
48th MMFF 2022 Gabi ng Parangal	December 27, 2022	Best Director	Paul Soriano	Nominated	
48th MMFF 2022 Gabi ng Parangal	December 27, 2022	Best Actress	Toni Gonzaga	Nominated	
48th MMFF 2022 Gabi ng Parangal	December 27, 2022	Best Screenplay	Toni Gonzaga	Nominated	
