= Reroute =

Philippine thriller film

- Official movie poster
- Directed by: Lawrence Fajardo
- Screenplay by: Ron Bryant
- Story by: Ron Bryant; Lawrence Fajardo
- Produced by: Vincent del Rosario III; Veronique del Rosario-Corpus; Valerie Del Rosario
- Starring: John Arcilla; Cindy Miranda; Sid Lucero
- Cinematography: Joshua Reyles
- Edited by: Lawrence Fajardo
- Music by: Peter Legaste
- Production company: Viva Films
- Distributed by: Viva Films (Vivamax)
- Release date: January 21, 2022
- Running time: 114 minutes
- Country: Philippines
- Language: Filipino

Reroute is a 2022 Philippine thriller film co-written, edited and directed by Lawrence Fajardo. The film stars John Arcilla, Cindy Miranda and Sid Lucero.

== Plot ==
Couple Trina (Cindy) and Dan (Sid), whose relationship is on the rocks, decide to visit Dan's dying father in his hometown. Along the way, they encounter a roadblock, prompting them to pass through a nearby shortcut. However, their car suddenly broke down and they met a retired soldier Gemo (John), who invites them to stay overnight at his house and promises to help in fixing their car the following morning. During their stay at Gemo's house, they know something is wrong.

== Cast ==
- John Arcilla as Gemo
- Cindy Miranda as Trina
- Sid Lucero as Dan
- Nathalie Hart as Lala
- Neil Tolentino as Gemo's Assistant
- Edwin Pamanian as Man in Carenderia
