= Nanahimik ang Gabi =

- Theatrical release poster
- Directed by: Shugo Praico
- Written by: Shugo Praico
- Produced by: Shugo Praico; Philip King; Lino Cayetano
- Starring: Ian Veneracion; Heaven Peralejo; Mon Confiado
- Cinematography: Moises Zee
- Edited by: Moises Zee
- Music by: Greg Rodriguez III
- Production company: Rein Entertainment Productions
- Distributed by: Rein Entertainment Productions
- Release date: December 25, 2022
- Country: Philippines
- Language: Filipino
- Box office: ₱7 million

Nanahimik ang Gabi (English: A Silent Night) is a 2022 Philippine horror-thriller film starring Ian Veneracion, Heaven Peralejo, and Mon Confiado. It was directed by Shugo Praico under Rein Entertainment.

== Synopsis ==
The film explores the secret relationship between a corrupt police officer and a young woman who acts as his "sugar baby". The couple spends a honeymoon getaway in a secluded house in rural area, until their vacation is disrupted by the appearance of an uninvited guest.

== Cast ==
- Ian Veneracion as Chief:
  A corrupt and abusive police officer who plays the role of "sugar daddy" in his relationship with Me-Ann.
- Heaven Peralejo as Me-Ann:
  The "sugar baby" of Chief.
- Mon Confiado as Soliman.

== Production ==
Nanahimik ang Gabi was produced under Rein Entertainment with Shugo Praico as its director and writer. The film is a suspense thriller that contains both sexual and violent content. The film revolves around the covert relationship of a woman with a corrupt police officer and "sugar daddy." Principal photography began in July 2022 in Tagaytay.

Peralejo was offered the role of Me-Ann three to four times. She initially hesitated to accept the role because she felt unready to perform certain scenes in the film.

Confiado employed method acting to prepare for his role as Soliman. To immerse himself in the part, he isolated himself in the mountains for four days, reflecting the film's setting in a secluded house. Director Praico described the casting for Confiado's role as “tricky,” noting that around 15 actors were considered for the part.

== Release ==
Nanahimik ang Gabi was released in cinemas in the Philippines on December 25, 2022, as one of the eight official entries of the 2022 Metro Manila Film Festival.

== Awards ==
Awards and nominations
Organization	Year	Nominatee/Work	Category	Result	Ref.
Metro Manila Film Festival	2022	Nanahimik ang gabi	Best Picture	Nominated	
Metro Manila Film Festival	2022	Shogu Praico	Best Director	Nominated	
Metro Manila Film Festival	2022	Ian Veneracion	Best Actor	Won	
Metro Manila Film Festival	2022	Heaven Peralejo	Best Actress	Nominated	
Metro Manila Film Festival	2022	Mon Confiado	Best Supporting Actor	Won	
Metro Manila Film Festival	2022	Shugo Praico	Best Screenplay	Nominated	
Metro Manila Film Festival	2022	Moo Zee	Best Cinematography	Nominated	
Metro Manila Film Festival	2022	Moo Zee	Best Editing	Nominated	
Metro Manila Film Festival	2022	Mariel Hizon	Best Production Design	Won	
Metro Manila Film Festival	2022	Nanahimik ang Gabi	Best Sound	Nominated	
Metro Manila Film Festival	2022	Greg Rodriguez III	Best Musical Score	Won	
Metro Manila Film Festival	2022	Nanahimik ang Gabi	Best Visual Effects	Nominated	
Metro Manila Film Festival	2022	Nanahimik ang Gabi	Gender Sensitivity Award	Nominated	
FAMAS Award	2023	Ian Veneracion	Best Actor	Nominated	
FAMAS Award	2023	Heaven Peralejo	Best Actress	Nominated	
FAMAS Award	2023	Mon Confiado	Best Supporting Actor	Nominated	
FAMAS Award	2023	Andrea Teresa Idioma and Emelio Ben Sparks	Best Sound	Nominated	
Luna Award	2023	Nanahimik ang Gabi	Best Picture	Nominated	
Luna Award	2023	Shugo Praico	Best Director	Nominated	
Luna Award	2023	Heaven Peralejo	Best Actress	Won	
Luna Award	2023	Mon Confiado	Best Supporting Actor	Nominated	
Luna Award	2023	Andrea Teresa Idioma	Best Sound	Nominated	
The EDDYS Awards	2023	Nanahimik ang gabi	Best Picture	Nominated	
The EDDYS Awards	2023	Shugo Praico	Best Director	Nominated	
The EDDYS Awards	2023	Shugo Praico	Best Screenplay	Nominated	
The EDDYS Awards	2023	Ian Veneracion	Best Actor	Nominated	
The EDDYS Awards	2023	Heaven Peralejo	Best Actress	Nominated	
The EDDYS Awards	2023	Mon Confiado	Best Supporting Actor	Won	
The EDDYS Awards	2023	Moo Zee	Best Cinematography	Won	
The EDDYS Awards	2023	Moo Zee	Best Editing	Nominated	
The EDDYS Awards	2023	Mariel Hizon	Best Production Design	Nominated	
The EDDYS Awards	2023	Andrea Teresa Idioma and Emelio Ben Sparks	Best Sound	Won	
The EDDYS Awards	2023	Nanahimik ang gabi	Best Visual Effects	Nominated	
