= Deleter =

2022 Filipino film by Mikhail Red

- Theatrical release poster
- Directed by: Mikhail Red
- Written by: Mikhail Red; Nikolas Red
- Produced by: Mikhail Red: Vicente G. del Rosario III; Veronique del Rosario-Corpus; Vicente Del Rosario Jr.
- Starring: Nadine Lustre; Louise delos Reyes; McCoy de Leon; Jeffrey Hidalgo
- Cinematography: Ian Alexander Guevara
- Edited by: Nikolas Red
- Music by: Myka Magsaysay-Sigua; Paul Sigua
- Production companies: Pelikula Red; Top Story
- Distributed by: Viva Films
- Release dates: December 25, 2022 (GRIMMFEST); October 5, 2023 (Manchester)
- Running time: 93 minutes
- Country: Philippines
- Language: Filipino
- Box office: ₱270 million

Deleter is a 2022 Philippine screenlife psychological horror thriller film directed by Mikhail Red, starring Nadine Lustre, Louise delos Reyes, McCoy de Leon, and Jeffrey Hidalgo. It was released theatrically on December 25, 2022 as an entry to the 2022 Metro Manila Film Festival.

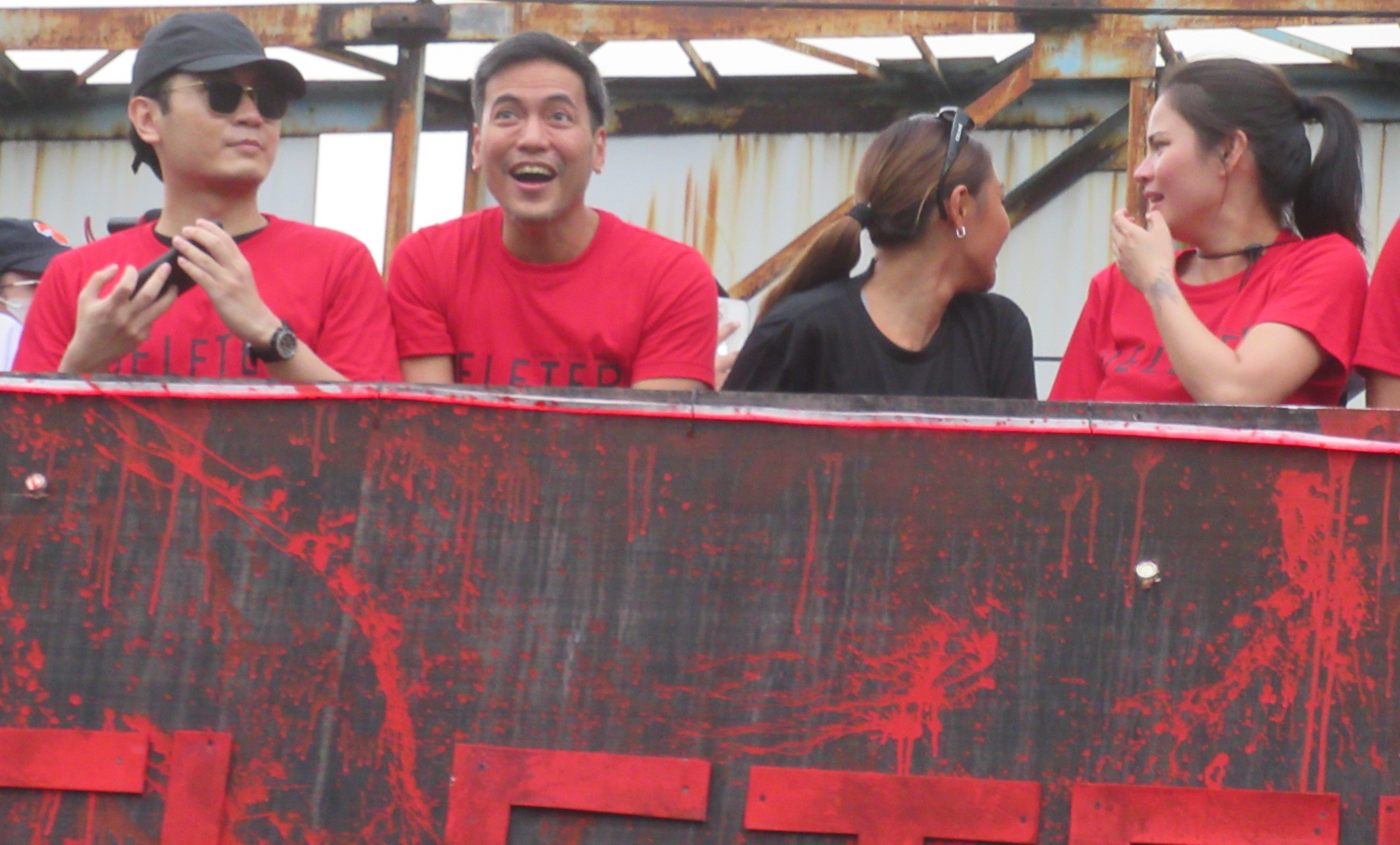
Float parade

== Plot summary ==
The film follows Lyra, who works shifts at a shadowy online content moderation office where employees, known as deleters, are tasked with the process of filtering graphic uploads from reaching social media platforms. The responsibility of censorship proves bearable for Lyra, whom her co-workers, as well as her boss Simon, observe as a cold person unfazed by the disturbing imagery she sees on a daily basis. What they do not know is that Lyra hides a deep trauma. Lyra’s attempt to erase and forget her past has forced her to maintain an apathetic face to the horrors of the world.

== Cast ==
=== Main ===
- Nadine Lustre as Lyra
- Louise delos Reyes as Aileen
- McCoy de Leon as Jace
- Jeffrey Hidalgo as Simon

=== Supporting ===
- Sarah Jane Abad as The Grey Woman
- Billy Villeta as Axel
- Madelaine Red as Gossiping Co-worker
- Elia Ilano as young Lyra
- Kedebon Colim as Store Attendant
- Keiko Fox as Sheka
- Charo Laude as Armi
- Matthew Francisco as Benru
- Nic Galvez as Gossiping Co-worker
- Bombi Plata as Lyra's father
- Erica Zerna as Lyra's mother / Crowd
- JC Martin as Jace's Co-worker

== Production ==
=== Development ===
Deleter was reported to be the first collaboration between Mikhail Red and Viva Films. Red worked on the Philippines' reputation being the "content moderation capital of the world" as well as the mental health and working conditions of content moderators for the story of Deleter.

=== Filming ===
Filming began in July 2022 amidst the COVID-19 pandemic and hence the usual COVID-19 protocols was observed. Only a few filming locations was utilized to simulate a "claustrophobic environment".

== Release ==
Deleter premiered in cinemas in the Philippines on December 25, 2022 as one of the eight entries of the 2022 Metro Manila Film Festival. However the film was not originally intended made specifically for the film festival.

The film was also released internationally. It premiered in the United States on January 6, 2023 and is set to be released in the United Arab Emirates on January 12, 2023.

== Accolades ==
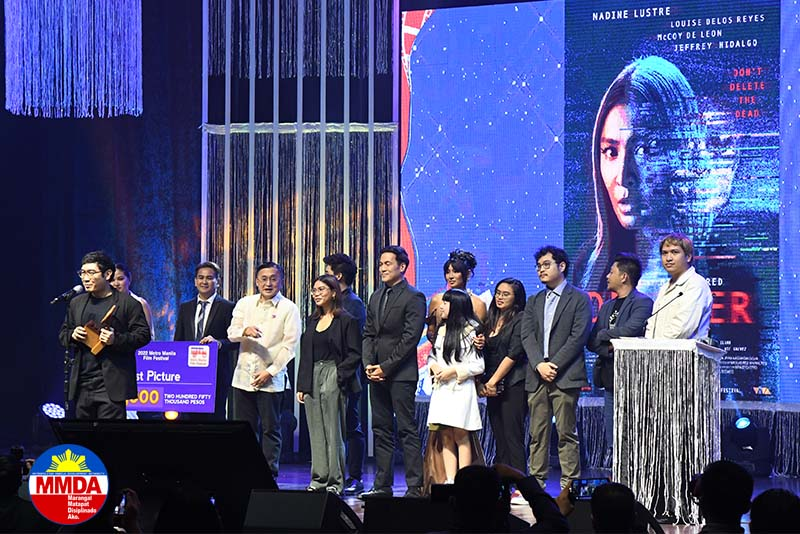
Cast of Deleter at the Gabi ng Parangal of the 2022 Metro Manila Film Festival.

Name of the award ceremony, year presented, category, nominee of the award, and the result of the nomination
Award ceremony	Year	Category	Nominee	Result	Ref.
Metro Manila Film Festival	2022	Best Picture	Deleter	Won	
Metro Manila Film Festival	2022	Best Director	Mikhail Red	Won	
Metro Manila Film Festival	2022	Best Actress	Nadine Lustre	Won	
Metro Manila Film Festival	2022	Best Supporting Actress	Louise delos Reyes	Nominated	
Metro Manila Film Festival	2022	Best Cinematography	Ian Alexander Guevarra	Won	
Metro Manila Film Festival	2022	Best Editing	Nikolas Red	Won	
Metro Manila Film Festival	2022	Best Production Design	Mark Jayson Jose	Nominated	
Metro Manila Film Festival	2022	Best Sound	Deleter	Won	
Metro Manila Film Festival	2022	Best Musical Score	Myka Magsaysay-Sigua, Paul Sigua	Nominated	
Metro Manila Film Festival	2022	Best Visual Effects	Gaspar Mangalin	Won	
Metro Manila Film Festival	2022	Star of the Night	Nadine Lustre	Won	
Metro Manila Film Festival	2022	Gender Sensitivity Award	Deleter	Nominated	
FAMAS Award	2023	Best Picture	Deleter	Nominated	
FAMAS Award	2023	Best Director	Mikhail Red	Nominated	
FAMAS Award	2023	Best Supporting Actress	Louise delos Reyes	Nominated	
FAMAS Award	2023	Best Screenplay	Mikhail Red, Nikolas Red	Nominated	
FAMAS Award	2023	Best Editing	Nikolas Red	Nominated	
FAMAS Award	2023	Best Cinematography	Ian Alexander Guevarra	Nominated	
FAMAS Award	2023	Best Musical Score	Myka Magsaysay-Sigua, Paul Sigua	Nominated	
FAMAS Award	2023	Best Sound	Deleter	Nominated	
Luna Award	2023	Best Director	Mikhail Red	Won	
Grimmfest	2023	Best Scare Award	Deleter	Won	
PMPC Star Awards for Movies	2023	Best Child Performer	Elia Ilano	Nominated	

== Reception ==
=== Box office ===
According to unofficial figures obtained by PEP.ph, Deleter has reportedly earned ₱10 million on the first day of the 2022 Metro Manila Film Festival, becoming the film with the second biggest opening for any entries that day. Three days after its released, the film has grossed more than ₱58 million. By the end of the year, Ogie Diaz, a showbiz columnist and talent manager reported that Deleter earned ₱126 million making it the top grossing film among the entries. On January 8, 2023, the film maintained its top spot after already grossing ₱234 million. The following day, this figure rose to ₱270 million.
