= Ian Veneracion =

Filipino actor and singer (born 1975)

Ian Veneración
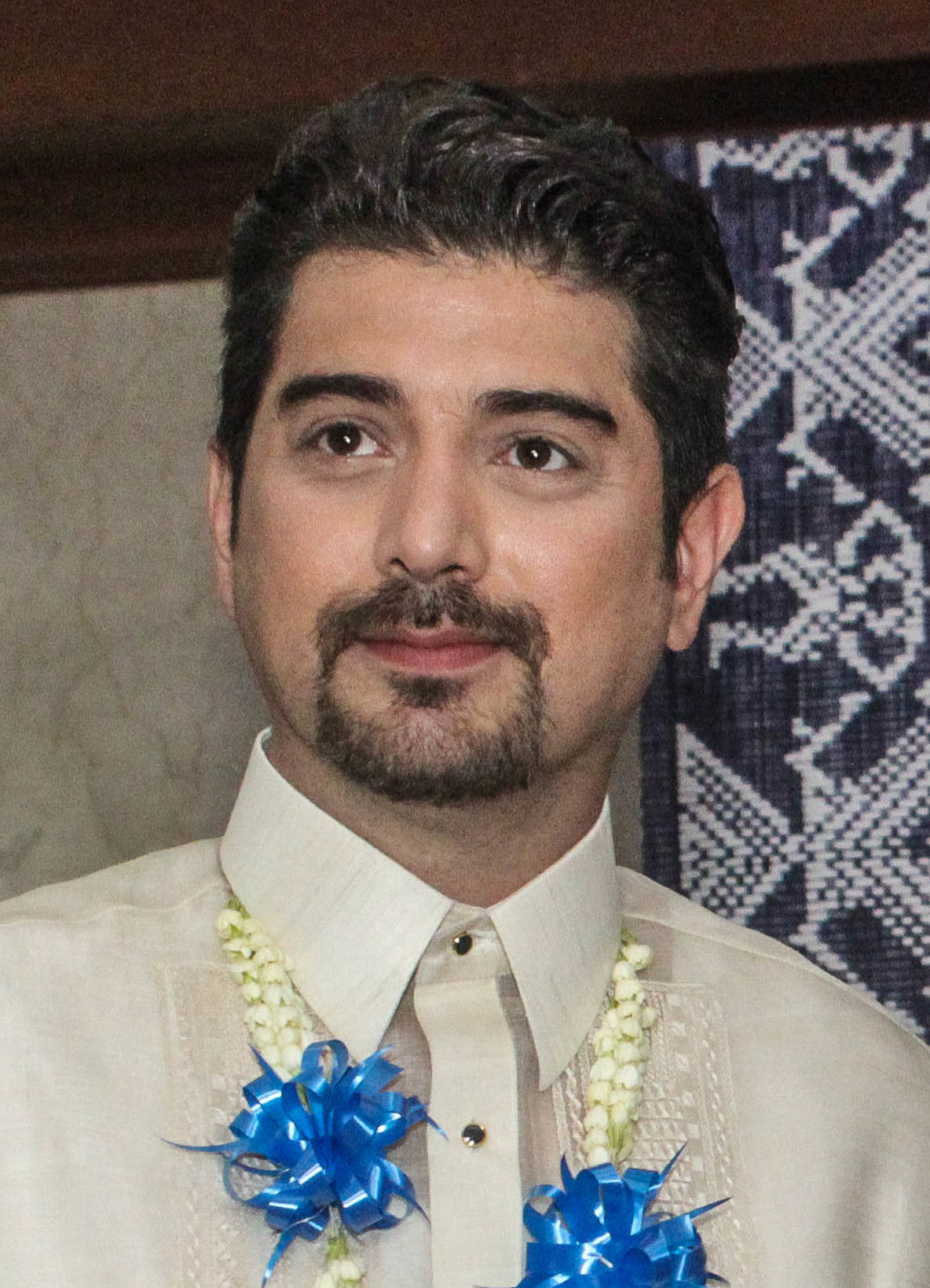
- Veneracion in 2019
- Born: Stephen Ian Veneración; February 7, 1975 (age 51); Manila, Philippines
- Citizenship: Philippines, Spain
- Occupation: Actor • Pilot
- Years active: 1982–present
- Spouse: Pam Gallardo (m. 1998)
- Children: 3
- Parents: Roy Veneración y Santos (father); Susan López y del Mar (mother)
- Relatives: Capt. Generoso López y Aguilar (maternal grandfather); Caridad del Mar y Duterte (maternal grandmother)

Stephen Ian Veneración (Tagalog: [ˈʔiː.ɐn bɛ.nɛ.ɾɐˈʃon]; born February 7, 1975) is a Filipino actor and singer.

== Career ==
His career started in 1982 as first appeared in RPN-9's show, Joey and Son. in 1986, Veneracion joined GMA Network's That's Entertainment, hosted by German Moreno. Throughout the 1990s, he starred in several action films. Veneracion's first drama appearance is Ikaw Lang ang Mamahalin since 2001. He later transferred to ABS-CBN in 2003, and had his first main role in Darating ang Umaga. In 2004, Veneracion returned to GMA Network and appeared in several shows.

He once again moved to ABS-CBN in 2007, and returned to GMA Network in 2008. He also appeared in two shows of Robin Padilla, Joaquin Bordado and Totoy Bato. Veneracion transferred from GMA Network to ABS-CBN in 2011. He popularly appeared in the remake of 2000 drama, Pangako Sa' Yo, starring Kathryn Bernardo and Daniel Padilla as Eduardo Buenavista in 2015. He appeared in the film directed by Antoinette Jadaone, The Achy Breaky Hearts, in a main role with Jodi Sta. Maria and Richard Yap in 2016. He did his first indie film, "Puti", in 2013. Primarily known as an action star, he regained fame in 2015 due to the popularity of his loveteam with Jodi Sta. Maria. In 2017, he appeared in the drama, A Love to Last, with Bea Alonzo and Iza Calzado. In 2023, he is also a part of the cast of The Iron Heart as one of the main casts of the series.

== Personal life ==
His father is renowned painter Roy Veneración, while his mother is Susan López. He grew up in Las Piñas but spent many of his childhood summers in Liloan, Cebu where his mother originally came from. He is of Spanish and Chinese descent on his maternal side, and is married to Pam Gallardo, an industrial engineer, with whom he has three children. Veneracion is an equipment engineer known to be an avid outdoorsman. He is a licensed private pilot, skydiver, paragliding pilot and scuba diver. He also engages in various outdoor activities such as trail riding, climbing, sailing and recreational fishing. Veneracion was a rider for the Shell-Yamaha motocross racing team between 2004 and 2006.

== Filmography ==
=== Television ===
Year	Title	Role
1982	Joey and Son	Jeffrey Laperal
1986–1996	That's Entertainment	Himself
1987	Hapi House	Episode guest
1996	Maalaala Mo Kaya: Pusang Itim	Bernie
1999	Tarajing Potpot	Andres
2001	Ikaw Lang ang Mamahalin	Paolo
2003	Darating ang Umaga	Abel Reverente
2004	Te Amo, Maging Sino Ka Man	Amiel
2004–2005	Mulawin	Panabon
2005	Encantadia	Armeo
2005	Magpakailanman	Tonton†
2006	Now and Forever: Tinig	Juan Miguel
2006	Mahiwagang Baul: Alamat ng Bahaghari	Haring Gati
2006	Encantadia: Pag-ibig Hanggang Wakas	Armeo
2006–2007	Mars Ravelo's Captain Barbell	Commander X
2007	Mga Kuwento ni Lola Basyang: Ang Prinsipeng Mahaba ang Ilong	Haring Arturo
2007	Mga Mata ni Anghelita	Tikwalin
2007–2008	Mars Ravelo's Lastikman	Agaddon
2008	Carlo J. Caparas' Joaquin Bordado	Jerome Apacible/Miguel Aguila
2008	Obra: Stella .45	Arman
2009	Sana Ngayong Pasko	Doctor Emmanuel
2009	Carlo J. Caparas' Totoy Bato	Miguel Velarde
2010	First Time	Robert Gomez
2010	Jillian: Namamasko Po	Migs
2011	I Heart You, Pare	Ramon Castillo
2011–2012	Maria la del Barrio	Fernando Dela Vega
2011	Maalaala Mo Kaya: Bibliya	Bong
2012	It's Showtime	Guest Celebrity Hurado
2013	Kailangan Ko'y Ikaw	Redentor "Red" Manrique
2013–2014	Got to Believe	Jaime Manansala
2015–2016	Pangako Sa'Yo	Eduardo Buenavista
2016	Dolce Amore	Priest
2017	A Love to Last	Antonio "Anton" Noble IV
2018	Maalaala Mo Kaya: Portrait	Cesar Legaspi
2020–2021	Oh My Dad!	Matthew Balderama
2022	My Papa Pi	Javier
2022–2023	The Iron Heart	Menandro Sin
2025	Incognito	Col. Gregorio "Greg" Paterno / Contractor / Noah

=== Web series ===
Year	Title	Role	Ref.
2020	My Single Lady	Chester Estero	
2022	One Good Day	Dale Sta. Maria	
2026	Drug War: A Conspiracy of Silence	Fr. Tom Carrillo	

=== Film ===
Year	Title	Role	Notes
1982	Never Ever Say Goodbye		
1983	Mang Kepweng and Son	Son	
1987	Di Bale Nalang	Anthony	
1987	Ako si Kiko, Ako si Kikay	Jimbo	
1987	Black Magic		
1988	Hiwaga sa Balete Drive	Jonathan	
1988	Hindi Tao, Hindi Hayop: Adventures of Seiko Jewels		
1988	One Two Bato, Three Four Bapor		
1989	Anak ng Demonyo	Devon	
1989	Pardina at ang Mga Duwende		
1990	Kunin Mo ang Ulo ni Ismael		
1990	Kristobal: Tinik sa Korona		
1990	Alyas Baby Face	Paolo	
1992	Boy Praning (Utak Pulbura)	Boy Praning	
1993	Pugoy – Hostage: Davao	Felipe Pugoy	
1993	Zaldong Tisoy: Batang Gagalangin ng Tondo	Zaldo	
1993	Bukas... Tatakpan Ka ng Dyaryo!	Billy	
1994	Isa Lang ang Buhay Mo! Sgt. Bobby Aguilar	Sgt. Bobby Aguilar	
1994	Pedrito Masangkay: Walang Bakas Na Iniiwan	Pedrito Masangkay	
1995	Kanto Boy 2: Anak ni Totoy Guapo	Guiller	21st Metro Manila Film Festival
1996	Ben Balasador: Akin ang Huling Alas	Ben Balasador	
1996	Rubberman	cameo appearance	
1997	Kapag Nasukol ang Asong Ulol	Armard Disierto	
1997	Bastardo	Roberto "Bobby" Cuevas	
1997	Totoy Hitman	Ernesto "Totoy" Ramirez	
1997	Halik ng Bampira	cameo appearance	
1998	Sinaktan Mo ang Puso Ko	Leonardo	
1998	Guevarra: Sa Batas Ko, Walang Hari	Capt. Daniel Guevarra	
1998	Gangland	Father Tunggo	
1998	Armadong Hudas	Rafael Reyes	
1999	Unfaithful Wife 2: Sana'y Huwag Akong Maligaw	Jimmy	
2000	Di Ko Kayang Tanggapin		
2001	Sgt. Maderazo: Bayad Na Pati ang Kaluluwa Mo	Sgt. Rodel Maderazo	
2001	Parehas ang Laban	Lt. David Valdez	
2002	Lapu-Lapu	Sebastian Del Cano	28th Metro Manila Film Festival
2004	inter.m@tes	Oliver Starman Dantes	
2006	Tulay		
2006	Moments of Love	Captain Ricardo Santos	
2008	Siquijor: Mystic Island	Xavier Adriano	
2008	Ate		
2011	Segunda Mano	Ivan's father	37th Metro Manila Film Festival
2012	El Presidente	General Ernesto Aguirre	38th Metro Manila Film Festival
2013	Puti	Amir	
2014	She's Dating the Gangster	Present Lucas	
2014	Once A Princess	Anthony	
2014	Feng Shui 2	Douglas	40th Manila Film Festival
2015	All You Need Is Pag-ibig	Erik	41st Metro Manila Film Festival
2016	The Achy Breaky Hearts	Ryan Martinez	
2017	Ilawod	Dennis	
2017	Bliss	Joshua	
2018	Paglisan	Crisanto	Animated film debut
2019	Unbreakable	Bene Saavedra	Cameo appearance
2020	Block Z	Mario	
2022	Nanahimik ang Gabi	Chief	2022 Metro Manila Film Festival

== Concert tours ==
=== Solo major concerts ===
Year	Title	Venue
2018	Ian in 3 Acts: The Concert	Waterfront Cebu City Hotel & Casino
2018	Ian in 3 Acts: Live in Manila	Resorts World Manila
July 11–12, 2019	Ian in Color	Music Museum

== Discography ==
=== Songs ===
Year	Song	Distribution
2018	"We're All Alone"	ABS-CBN Star Music
2018	"Ikaw" (Paglisan OST)	ABS-CBN Star Music
2018	"Hari ng Kwento" (Paglisan OST)	ABS-CBN Star Music
2018	"Ten Past Eleven" (Paglisan OST)	ABS-CBN Star Music
2018	"Dolores" (Paglisan OST)	ABS-CBN Star Music
2018	"Kilala Kita" (Paglisan OST)	ABS-CBN Star Music
TBA	"Through the Years"	ABS-CBN Star Music
TBA	"Can Find No Reason"	ABS-CBN Star Music

== Awards and nominations ==
Year	Award	Category	Work	Result
2015	41st Metro Manila Film Festival	Best Actor	All You Need Is Pag-Ibig	Nominated
2016	7th NSCART Awards	Best Supporting Actor in Primetime Teleserye	Pangako Sa 'Yo	Won
2017	3rd Platinum Stallion Media Awards 2017	Best Male TV Personality	Himself	Won
2017	48th GMMSF Box-Office Entertainment Awards	All-Time Favorite Actor		Won
2017	33rd PMPC Star Awards for Movies	Movie Loveteam of the Year with (Jodi Sta. Maria)	The Achy Breaky Hearts	Nominated
2018	38th Fantasporto International Film Festival	Best Actor	Ilawod	Won
2022	2022 Metro Manila Film Festival	Best Actor	Nanahimik ang Gabi	Won
