= Luna Award for Best Actor =

Male category award to the best actor

- Awarded for: Best Performance by an Actor in a Leading Role
- Country: Philippines
- Presented by: Film Academy of the Philippines (FAP)
- First award: 1983
- Currently held by: Roderick Paulate; In His Mother's Eyes (2024)

Highlights
- Most wins: Phillip Salvador (7)
- Most nominations: Christopher de Leon (10)

The Luna Award for Best Actor is an award presented annually by the Film Academy of the Philippines (FAP). It has been awarded since the 1st Luna Awards to actors who have delivered outstanding performance in a lead role.

In 1981, the Executive Order 640-A signed by President Ferdinand Marcos mandated the Film Academy of the Philippines to recognize excellence in Philippine filmmaking annually. However, due to recurring financial difficulties, the Luna Awards were not held in certain years or were sometimes postponed to a later date.

Roderick Paulate currently holds this title for his role in In His Mother's Eyes. Meanwhile, Phillip Salvador has the record for most wins in this category with seven awards.

== Winners and nominees ==
The winner is shown first, followed by the other nominees.

=== 1980s ===
| Year | Actor | Film | Role |
|---|---|---|---|
1983 (1st)
| 1983 (1st) | Phillip Salvador | Cain at Abel | Lorenzo "Lorens" Laurente |
1984 (2nd)
| 1984 (2nd) | Fernando Poe Jr. | Umpisahan Mo... Tatapusin Ko! | Delfin Prado |
1985 (3rd)
| 1985 (3rd) | Rudy Fernandez | Pasukin si Waway | Waway |
1986 (4th)
| 1986 (4th) | Phillip Salvador | Bayan Ko | Turing |
1987 (5th)
| 1987 (5th) | Fernando Poe Jr. | Muslim .357 | Jamal Razul |
1988 (6th)
| 1988 (6th) | Phillip Salvador | Balweg | Fr. Conrado Balweg / Ka Ambo |
1989 (7th)
| 1989 (7th) | Phillip Salvador | Boy Negro | Boy Negro |

=== 1990s ===
| Year | Actor | Film | Role |
|---|---|---|---|
1990 (8th)
| 1990 (8th) | Tirso Cruz III | Bilangin ang Bituin sa Langit | Dr. Anselmo Santos / Anselmo Santos Jr. |
1991 (9th)
| 1991 (9th) | Christopher de Leon | Biktima | Jing Aureus |
1992 (10th)
| 1992 (10th) | Christopher de Leon | Ipagpatawad Mo | Mike |
1993 (11th)
| 1993 (11th) | Eddie Gutierrez | Ikaw Pa Lang ang Minahal | Dr. Maximo Sevilla |
1994 (12th)
| 1994 (12th) | Phillip Salvador | Masahol Pa sa Hayop | Cpt. Tomas Padilla |
1995 (13th)
| 1995 (13th) | Phillip Salvador | Ka Hector | Ka Hector |
1996 (14th)
| 1996 (14th) | Richard Gomez | Dahas | Jake |
| 1996 (14th) | Aga Muhlach | Sana Maulit Muli | Jerry |
| 1996 (14th) | Fernando Poe Jr. | Kahit Butas ng Karayom… Papasukin Ko | Daniel |
1997 (15th)
| 1997 (15th) | Phillip Salvador | Hangga't May Hininga | Cpt. Ellis Soriano |
| 1997 (15th) | Christopher de Leon | Madrasta | Edward Chavez |
1998 (16th)
| 1998 (16th) | Fernando Poe Jr. | Eseng ng Tondo | Eusebio "Eseng" Natividad |
1999 (17th)
| 1999 (17th) | Rudy Fernandez | Birador | Mike Santana |

=== 2000s ===
| Year | Actor | Film | Role |
|---|---|---|---|
2000 (18th)
| 2000 (18th) | Christopher de Leon | Bulaklak ng Maynila | Timo |
| 2000 (18th) | Cesar Montano | Muro-Ami | Fredo Obsioma |
2001 (19th)
| 2001 (19th) | Eddie Garcia | Deathrow | Lolo Sinat |
| 2001 (19th) | Dante Rivero | Azucena | Teban |
| 2001 (19th) | Edu Manzano | Tanging Yaman | Art |
| 2001 (19th) | Johnny Delgado | Tanging Yaman | Danny |
| 2001 (19th) | Rudy Fernandez | Palaban | Major Jack Morales |
2002 (20th)
| 2002 (20th) | Ricky Davao | Minsan May Isang Puso | Simon Pacheco |
| 2002 (20th) | Cesar Montano | Bagong Buwan | Dr. Ahmad Ibn Ismael |
| 2002 (20th) | Diether Ocampo | La Vida Rosa | Dado |
| 2002 (20th) | Jay Manalo | Hubog | Uno |
| 2002 (20th) | Piolo Pascual | Mila | Primo |
2003 (21st)
| 2003 (21st) | Lito Lapid | Lapu-Lapu | Lapu-Lapu |
| 2003 (21st) | Christopher de Leon | Dekada '70 | Julian Bartolome |
| 2003 (21st) | Fernando Poe Jr. | Batas ng Lansangan | Mayor Ruben Medrano |
| 2003 (21st) | Rico Yan | Got 2 Believe | Lorenz Montinola |
| 2003 (21st) | Rudy Fernandez | Diskarte | Jake |
2004 (22nd)
| 2004 (22nd) | Jiro Manio | Magnifico | Magnifico |
| 2004 (22nd) | Christopher de Leon | Mano Po 2: My Home | Antonio Chan |
| 2004 (22nd) | Richard Gomez | Filipinas | Samuel Filipinas |
2005 (23rd)
| 2005 (23rd) | Dennis Trillo | Aishite Imasu 1941: Mahal Kita | Ignacio Basa / Igna |
| 2005 (23rd) | Christopher de Leon | Mano Po III: My Love | Michael Lim |
| 2005 (23rd) | Jericho Rosales | Santa Santita | Mike |
| 2005 (23rd) | Piolo Pascual | Milan | Lino |
| 2005 (23rd) | Yul Servo | Naglalayag | Noah Garcia |
2006 (24th)
| 2006 (24th) | Marvin Agustin | Kutob | Lemuel |
| 2006 (24th) | Dennis Trillo | Blue Moon | Kyle |
| 2006 (24th) | Eddie Garcia | Blue Moon | Manuel |
| 2006 (24th) | Nathan Lopez | Ang Pagdadalaga ni Maximo Oliveros | Maxi Oliveros |
| 2006 (24th) | Ricky Davao | Mga Pusang Gala | Boyet |
2007 (25th)
| 2007 (25th) | John Lloyd Cruz | All About Love | Eric |
| 2007 (25th) | Eddie Garcia | I Wanna Be Happy | Husband |
| 2007 (25th) | Robert Arevalo | Barcelona | |
| 2007 (25th) | Rustom Padilla | Zsa Zsa Zaturnnah Ze Moveeh | Adrian "Ada" |
| 2007 (25th) | Sid Lucero | Donsol | Daniel |
2008 (26th)
| 2008 (26th) | Paolo Contis | Banal | Cristobal "Cris" Marcelo |
| 2008 (26th) | Aga Muhlach | A Love Story | Ian Montes |
| 2008 (26th) | Joel Torre | Ataul: For Rent | Guido / Guidote Alejo |
| 2008 (26th) | John Lloyd Cruz | One More Chance | Popoy Gonzalez |
| 2008 (26th) | Piolo Pascual | Paano Kita Iibigin | Lance |
2009 (27th)*
| 2009 (27th)* | Christopher de Leon | Magkaibigan | Atoy |
| 2009 (27th)* | Aga Muhlach | When Love Begins | Ben Caballero |
| 2009 (27th)* | Baron Geisler | Torotot | Leo |
| 2009 (27th)* | Jericho Rosales | Baler | Celso Resurrecion |
| 2009 (27th)* | John Estrada | Caregiver | Teddy Gonzales |
| 2009 (27th)* | John Lloyd Cruz | A Very Special Love | Miggy Montenegro |

=== 2010s ===
| Year | Actor | Film | Role |
|---|---|---|---|
2010 (28th)
| 2010 (28th) | No awards given for this year. | | |
2011 (29th)*
| 2011 (29th)* | Dolphy | Father Jejemon | Father Jejemon |
| 2011 (29th)* | Christopher de Leon | Sa 'Yo Lamang | Franco |
| 2011 (29th)* | Coco Martin | Noy | Manolo "Noy" Agapito |
| 2011 (29th)* | Fanny Serrano | Tarima | Roselo |
| 2011 (29th)* | Sid Lucero | Muli | Jun Bernabe |
2012 (30th)
| 2012 (30th) | ER Ejercito | Manila Kingpin: The Asiong Salonga Story | Asiong Salonga |
| 2012 (30th) | Bong Revilla | Ang Panday 2 | Panday |
| 2012 (30th) | Derek Ramsay | No Other Woman | Ram Escaler |
| 2012 (30th) | Dingdong Dantes | Segunda Mano | Ivan |
| 2012 (30th) | Martin Escudero | Zombadings 1: Patayin sa Shokot si Remington | Remington |
2013 (31st)
| 2013 (31st) | John Lloyd Cruz | The Mistress | Frederico "JD" Torres |
| 2013 (31st) | Aga Muhlach | Of All the Things | Atty. Emilio "Umboy" Arellano |
| 2013 (31st) | Coco Martin | Sta. Niña | Paulino "Pol" Mungcal |
| 2013 (31st) | Dingdong Dantes | One More Try | Edward |
| 2013 (31st) | Eddie Garcia | Bwakaw | Rene |
2014 (32nd)
| 2014 (32nd) | No awards given for this year. | | |
2015 (33rd)
| 2015 (33rd) | No awards given for this year. | | |
2016 (34th)
| 2016 (34th) | John Arcilla | Heneral Luna | Gen. Antonio Luna |
| 2016 (34th) | Buboy Villar | Kid Kulafu | Emmanuel "Manny" Pacquiao |
| 2016 (34th) | Dennis Trillo | Felix Manalo | Felix Manalo |
| 2016 (34th) | JM de Guzman | That Thing Called Tadhana | Anthony |
| 2016 (34th) | John Lloyd Cruz | Honor Thy Father | Edgar |
| 2016 (34th) | Sid Lucero | Apocalypse Child | Ford |
2017 (35th)
| 2017 (35th) | Bembol Roco | Pauwi Na | Mang Pepe |
| 2017 (35th) | Aljur Abrenica | Ang Hapis at Himagsik ni Hermano Puli | Hermano Puli |
| 2017 (35th) | Joshua Garcia | Vince & Kath & James | Vince |
| 2017 (35th) | Paolo Ballesteros | Die Beautiful | Trisha Echevarria / Patrick Villar |
| 2017 (35th) | Ronwaldo Martin | Pamilya Ordinaryo | Aries |
2018 (36th)
| 2018 (36th) | Aga Muhlach | Seven Sundays | Allan A. Bonifacio |
| 2018 (36th) | Allen Dizon | Bomba | Pipo |
| 2018 (36th) | Empoy Marquez | Kita Kita | Tonyo |
| 2018 (36th) | Jericho Rosales | Siargao | Diego |
| 2018 (36th) | Joshua Garcia | Love You to the Stars and Back | Caloy |
| 2018 (36th) | Justine Samson | Balangiga: Howling Wilderness | Kulas |
| 2018 (36th) | Noel Trinidad | Paki | Uro |
| 2018 (36th) | Nonie Buencamino | Smaller and Smaller Circles | Father Augusto Saenz, SJ |
| 2018 (36th) | Sandino Martin | Changing Partners | Cris |
2019 (37th)
| 2019 (37th) | Daniel Padilla | The Hows of Us | Yohan Silva |
| 2019 (37th) | Christian Bables | Signal Rock | Intoy Abakan |
| 2019 (37th) | Dingdong Dantes | Sid & Aya: Not a Love Story | Sid |
| 2019 (37th) | Eddie Garcia | Rainbow's Sunset | Ramon Estrella |
| 2019 (37th) | Nicco Manalo | Gusto Kita with All My Hypothalamus | Caloy |

=== 2020s ===
| Year | Actor | Film | Role |
|---|---|---|---|
2020 (38th)
| 2020 (38th) | Jansen Magpusao | John Denver Trending | John Denver Cabungcal |
| 2020 (38th) | Gio Gahol | Sila-Sila | Gabriel |
| 2020 (38th) | Kristoffer King | Verdict | Dante Santos |
| 2020 (38th) | Louise Abuel | Edward | Edward |
| 2020 (38th) | Raymond Bagatsing | Quezon's Game | Pres. Manuel L. Quezon |
2021
| 2021 | No awards given for this year. | | |
2022
| 2022 | No awards given for this year. | | |
2023 (39th)
| 2023 (39th) | Noel Trinidad | Family Matters | Francisco Florencio |
| 2023 (39th) | Cesar Montano | Maid in Malacañang | Pres. Ferdinand Marcos |
| 2023 (39th) | Christian Bables | Mahal Kita, Beksman | Dali |
| 2023 (39th) | Jerome Ponce | Katips | Gregorio "Greg" Lagusnilad |
| 2023 (39th) | Sid Lucero | Reroute | Dan |
2024 (40th)
| 2024 (40th) | Roderick Paulate | In His Mother's Eyes | Bibs |
| 2024 (40th) | Carlo Aquino | Third World Romance | Alvin |
| 2024 (40th) | Cedrick Juan | GomBurZa | Father Jose Burgos |
| 2024 (40th) | Christopher de Leon | When I Met You in Tokyo | Joey |
| 2024 (40th) | Dingdong Dantes | Rewind | John Nuñez |

== Multiple wins ==
The following individuals have won two or more Luna Awards for Best Actor:

| Wins | Actor | Nominations | First Win | Latest Win |
|---|---|---|---|---|
| 7 | Phillip Salvador | 7 | Cain at Abel (1983) | Hangga't May Hininga (1997) |
| 4 | Christopher de Leon | 10 | Biktima (1991) | Magkaibigan (2011)* |
| 3 | Fernando Poe Jr. | 5 | Umpisahan Mo... Tatapusin Ko! (1984) | Eseng ng Tondo (1998) |
| 2 | John Lloyd Cruz | 5 | All About Love (2007) | The Mistress (2013) |
| 2 | Rudy Fernandez | 4 | Pasukin si Waway (1985) | Birador (1999) |

^{*The 27th and 29th Luna Awards were held on the same day due to financial difficulties.}
