= 1988 FAMAS Awards =

36th edition of Filipino movie awards

36th FAMAS Awards
- Date: May 6, 1988
- Site: Manila Hotel Fiesta Pavilion; Manila, Philippines

Highlights
- Best Picture: Saan Nagtatago ang Pag-ibig ~ VIVA Films
- Most awards: Saan Nagtatago ang Pag-ibig ~ VIVA Films (4 wins)

The 36th Filipino Academy of Movie Arts and Sciences Awards Night was held on May 6, 1988 at the Manila Hotel Fiesta Pavilion in the Philippines, honoring the best films of 1987.

Saan Nagtatago ang Pag-ibig won the most awards with four wins including the most coveted FAMAS Award for Best Picture Three people were elevated to the "Hall Of Fame" status after winning their respective categories five times. They were Fernando Poe Jr. for best actor, Augusto Salvador for editing and George Canseco for musical score. This is the second time for Canseco who was earlier inducted to the Hall of Fame for winning five time in the Theme Song Category.

== Awards ==
=== Major awards ===
Winners are listed first and highlighted with boldface.

| Best Picture | Best Director |
|---|---|
| **Saan Nagtatago ang Pag-ibig — Viva Films**; Balweg — Viva Films; Paano kung Wala Ka Na? — Regal Films; Pinulot Ka Lang sa Lupa — Regal Films; Tagos sa Dugo — V.H. Films | **Eddie Garcia — Saan Nagtatago ang Pag-ibig**; Leroy Salvador — Alabok sa Lupa; Mel Chionglo — Paano Kung Wala Ka Na; Ishmael Bernal — Pinulot Ka Lang sa Lupa; Maryo J. De los Reyes — Tagos sa Dugo |
| Best Actor | Best Actress |
| **Rudy Fernandez — Operation: Get Victor Corpus, the Rebel Soldier as Victor Corpus**; Phillip Salvador — Balweg as Conrado Balweg; Christopher De Leon — Maging Akin Ka Lamang as Andy Abrigo; Dolphy — Once Upon a Time as Puga; Tonton Gutierrez — Saan Nagtatago ang Pag-ibig? as Val | **Vilma Santos — Tagos ng Dugo as Josefina 'Pina' Ramos Regala**; Lorna Tolentino — Maging Akin Ka Lamang as Rosita Monteverde; Susan Roces — Paano Kung Wala Ka Na; Sharon Cuneta — Pasan Ko ang Daigdig as Guadalupe "Lupe" Velez; Maricel Soriano — Pinulot Ka Lang sa Lupa as Angeli |
| Best Supporting Actor | Best Supporting Actress |
| **Jay Ilagan — Maging Akin Ka Lamang as Ernie Balboa**; Johnny Delgado — Balweg as Ka George; Mark Gil — Kid, Huwag Kang Susuko as Wyrlo; Ricky Davao — Kung Aagawin Mo ang Lahat sa Akin as Arvin; Ronnie Ricketts — Target: Sparrow Unit as Jose | **Nida Blanca — Kid, Huwag Kang Susuko as Aling Turing**; Jackie Lou Blanco — Kung Aagawin Mo ang Lahat sa Akin as Gladys Andrada; Dina Bonnevie — Maging Akin Ka Lamang as Elsa Paruel-Abrigo; Snooky Serna — Paano Kung Wala Ka Na; Gloria Romero — Saan Nagtatago ang Pag-ibig as Carmen |
| Best Child Actor | Best Child Actress |
| **Mel Martinez — Kid, Huwag Kang Susuko as Pongkee**; Joko Diaz — Ibigay Mo sa Akin ang Bukas; Chuckie Dreyfus — Once Upon a Time' as Lally; Raymond and Richard Gutierrez — Takbo...! Bilis...! Takboooo; Ian de Leon — Takot Ako, Eh!; Vandolph — Wanted: Bata Batuta! | **Glaiza Herradura — Batas sa Aking Kamay**; Rose Ann Gonzales — Mga Anak ni Facifica Falayfay; Matet de Leon — Bunsong Kerubin as Angelita; Tina Cruz — Vigilante; Katrin Gonzales — Walang Karugtong ang Nakaraan as Gretchen |
| Best Screenplay | Best Story |
| **Alfred Yuson — Kid, Huwag Kang Susuko** | **Gilda Olvidado — Saan Nagtatago ang Pag-ibig?** |
| Best Sound | Best Musical Score |
| **Rolly Ruta — Saan Nagtatago ang Pag-ibig** | **Willy Cruz — Balweg** |
| Best Cinematography | Best Editing |
| **Romy Vitug — Saan Nagtatago ang Pag-ibig** | **Ike Jarlego Jr. — Balweg** |
| Best Theme Song | Production Design |
| **Gines Tan — Pinulot Ka Lang sa Lupa** | **Don Escudero — Once Upon a Time** |

=== Special Awardee ===
- **Hall of Fame Awardee**
  - **Fernando Poe Jr. - Actor**
    - 1986 - Muslim .357
    - 1984 - Umpisahan Mo, Tatapusin Ko
    - 1980 - Durugin si Totoy Bato
    - 1972 - Asedillo
    - 1968 - Mga Alabok sa Lupa

- **Hall of Fame Awardee**
  - **Augusto Salvador - Editing**
    - 1987 - Lumuhod Ka sa Lupa
    - 1986 - Partida
    - 1980 - Durugin si Totoy Bato
    - 1979 - Gumising Ka, Maruja
    - 1971 - Mga Anghel Na Walang Langit

- **Hall of Fame Awardee**
  - **George Canseco - Musical Score**
    - 1987 - Palimos ng Pag-ibig
    - 1983 - Gaano Kadalas ang Minsan?
    - 1981 - Miss X
    - 1980 - Huwag, Bayaw
    - 1979 - Pagputi ng Uwak, Pag-itim ng Tagak
