= 1983 FAMAS Awards =

31st edition of Filipino movie awards

31st FAMAS Awards
- Date: May 28, 1983
- Site: Philippines

Highlights
- Best Picture: Cain and Abel ~ Cine Suerte Inc.
- Most awards: Gaano ka dalas ang Minsan ~ VIVA Films (6 wins)

The 31st Filipino Academy of Movie Arts and Sciences Awards Night was held on May 28, 1983, in the Philippines . The event recognized outstanding achievements of the different films for the year 1982.

VIVA Films "Gaano kadalas ang Minsan? won the most award with 6 wins but the FAMAS Award for Best Picture went to Cain and Abel. Vilma Santos won her third FAMAS Best Actress award.

== Awards ==
=== Major awards ===
Winners are listed first and highlighted with boldface.

| Best Picture | Best Director |
|---|---|
| **Cain and Abel — Cine Suerte Inc.**; Gaano Kadalas ang Minsan — VIVA Films; Himala — Experimental Cinema of the Philippines; Ang Panday: Ikatlong Yugto — FPJ Productions; Sinasamba Kita — VIVA Films | **Eddie Garcia — Sinasamba Kita**; Lino Brocka — Cain and Abel; Danny L. Zialcita — Gaano Kadalas ang Minsan; Ishmael Bernal — Himala; Fernando Poe Jr. — Ang Panday: Ikatlong Yugto; Marilou Diaz-Abaya — Moral |
| Best Actor | Best Actress |
| **Anthony Alonzo — Bambang**; Phillip Salvador — Cain and Abel; Dindo Fernando — Gaano Kadalas ang Minsan; George Estregan — 'Lalake Ako; Dolphy — 'My heart Belongs to Daddy; Fernando Poe Jr. — Ang Panday: Ikatlong Yugto | **Vilma Santos — Relasyon**; Nora Aunor — Mga Uod at Rosas; Mona Lisa — Cain and Abel; Alma Moreno — Diary of Cristina Gaston; Liza Lorena — Santa Claus is coming to Town; Hilda Koronel— PX |
| Best Supporting Actor | Best Supporting Actress |
| **Juan Rodrigo — Moral**; Tommy Abuel — Gaano Kadalas ang Minsan; Rodolfo "boy" Garcia — Ito ba ang ating mga Anak; Mark Gil — Palipat-lipat, Papalit-palit; Paquito Diaz — In this Corner; Lito Anzures — Ang Panday: Ikatlong Yugto; Ronaldo Valdez — Pedring Taruc; Joel Alano — Santa Claus is coming to Town | **Sandy Andolong — Moral**; Alicia Alonzo — Bambang; Cecille Castillo — Cain and Abel; Cherie Gil — Gaano kadalas ang Minsan; Rio Locsin — Haplos; Gigi Dueñas — Himala; Perla Bautista — In this Corner |
| Best Child Actor | Best Child Actress |
| **Ryan Soler — Cain and Abel**; Alvin Enriquez — Gaano kadalas ang Minsan; Michael Pigar — Pepeng Kaliwete; Bentot Jr. — Ang Panday: Ikatlong Yugto | **Sheryl Cruz — Roman Rapido**; Monette Garcia — Ang Panday: Ikatlong Yugto; Aiko Melendez — Santa Claus is coming to town |
| Best in Screenplay | Best Story |
| **Tom Adrales & Danny L. Zialcita — Gaano kadalas ang minsan?** | **Tom Adrales — Gaano kadalas ang Minsan?** |
| Best Sound | Best Musical Score |
| **Vic Macamay — Gaano kadalas ang minsan?** | **George Canseco — PGaano kadalas ang minsan?** |
| Best Cinematography | Best Editing |
| **Ver Reyes — Ang Panday: Ikatlong Yugto** | **Ike Jarlego Jr. — IGaano kadalas ang minsan?** |
| Best Theme Song | Production Design |
| **George Canseco — Gaano kadlas ang Minsan?** | **Rolando Sacristia — Ang Panday: Ikatlong Yugto** |

=== Special Awardee ===
- **Hall Of Fame Awardees**
  - Joseph Estrada - Actor
    - 1982 - Kumander Alibasbas
    - 1970 - Patria Adorada
    - 1967 - Ito Ang Pilipino
    - 1965 - Geron Busabos, Ang Batang Quiapo
    - 1963 - Markang Rehas
- **Hall Of Fame Awardees**
  - **Emar Pictures/JE Productions** - Producer
    - 1982 - Kumander Alibasbas
    - 1978 - Bakya Mo Neneng
    - 1973 - Kill The Pushers
    - 1967 - Ito Ang Pilipino
    - 1965 - Geron Busabos, Ang Batang Quiapo
