= Bukas, Babaha ng Dugo =

Philippine action film

Bukas Babaha ng Dugo
- Directed by: Baldo Marro
- Written by: Baldo Marro
- Produced by: Lily Y. Monteverde
- Starring: Lito Lapid; Via Veloso; Emilio Garcia
- Cinematography: Rey de Leon
- Edited by: Joe Solo
- Music by: Nonong Buencamino
- Production company: Regal Entertainment
- Distributed by: Regal Entertainment
- Release date: September 19, 2001
- Running time: 96 minutes
- Country: Philippines
- Language: Filipino

Bukas, Babaha ng Dugo (lit. 'Tomorrow, Blood Will Flow') is a 2001 Philippine action film written and directed by Baldo Marro. The film stars Lito Lapid, Via Veloso and Emilio Garcia.

The film is streaming online on YouTube.

== Plot ==
Felix Mercado (Lito Lapid) is an honest soldier who contemplates retiring from military service. He is approached in his farm by members of his squad, who have planned a heist without his knowledge and disguised it as a legitimate mission from their commanding officer. Felix reluctantly joins his team; they ambush a gang of bank robbers, then kill the pursuing police officers. As the group escape at sea using scuba tanks, they sabotage Felix's tank so he would be forced to surface. Mercado is caught and consequently convicted for the murders.

Meanwhile, Paulo (Emilio Garcia), a syndicate leader who had been lusting over Felix's wife Norma (Via Veloso), leads a raid on the Mercados' house, raping and killing not only the wife but also the soldier's younger sister Ineng. Felix's daughter Jenny escapes the chaos and is hidden by her grandfather.

Felix receives word about the carnage back home and escapes from prison. He returns on the night his father is killed by Paulo's group, but is wounded while saving Jenny. The Mercados seek shelter in Adela's (Sharla Tolentino) hut, where Felix plans his revenge while recovering.

Having known that the mission order was fake, Felix eliminates his former groupmates one by one, avenging the treachery done to him. Meanwhile, while at the market with Adela, Jenny recognizes the tattoo on the hand of one of Paulo's henchmen and reports it to her father, who then shows up at the scene and kills the goons. Paulo's men follow Felix to Adela's home and plot an assault wherein Adela's mother gets killed. Mercado fights back and runs to the river with Paulo's gang giving chase. The gun battle ends with Felix blowing up Paulo with a grenade launcher.

== Cast ==
- Lito Lapid as Felix Mercado
- Via Veloso as Norma Mercado
- Emilio Garcia as Paulo
- Kristine Mangle as Ineng Mercado
- Sharla Tolentino as Adela
- Ernie Forte as Tata Gunding
- Joanna Gonzales as Jenny
- Dindo Arroyo as King
- Alex David as Robert
- Leo Gamboa as Ben
- Banjo Romero as Rey
- Alex Bolado as Tony
- Ramon Baldomarro as Eddie
- Alex De Guzman as Poklat
- Froilan Sales as Kardo
- Vicdel Rodrigo as Private Army
- Richard Duran as Mando
- Baldo Marro as Boy Bisoy
- Diding Andres as Aling Chabeng
- Boy Pineda as Usisero
- Abner Afuang as Nympha
- Ken Davitian as Raul
