= Gawad Urian for Best Actor =

Annual Philippine film award

- Awarded for: Pinakamahusay na Pangunahing Aktor (Best Performance by an Actor in a Leading Role)
- Country: Philippines
- Presented by: Manunuri ng Pelikulang Pilipino
- First award: 1977
- Most recent winner: Carlo Aquino; Bar Boys: After School (2026) & Jericho Rosales; Quezon (2026)

Highlights
- Most awards: Phillip Salvador (3); Richard Gomez (3)
- Most nominations: Christopher de Leon (13)
- Website: http://www.manunuri.com

The Gawad Urian Best Actor, (officially, the Pinakamahusay na Pangunahing Aktor) is a movie award given by the Manunuri ng Pelikulang Pilipino (Filipino Film Critics) to lead actors in a Philippine movie.

The current award holder is Dennis Trillo for Green Bones.

== Winners and nominees ==
In the lists below, the winner of the award for each year is shown first, followed by the other nominees.

=== 1970s ===
Year	Actor	Film	Role
1977 (1st)
1977 (1st)	Vic Silayan	Ligaw na Bulaklak	
1977 (1st)	Bembol Roco	Lunes, Martes, Miyerkules, Huwebes, Biyernes, Sabado, Linggo	
1977 (1st)	Christopher de Leon	Ganito Kami Noon, Paano Kayo Ngayon	Nicolas "Kulas" Ocampo
1977 (1st)	Robert Arevalo	Divorce: Pilipino Style	
1977 (1st)	Tommy Abuel	Putik ka Man, Sa Alabok Magbalik	
1978 (2nd)
1978 (2nd)	Bembol Roco	Sa Piling ng Mga Sugapa	
1978 (2nd)	Dindo Fernando	Inay	Maning
1978 (2nd)	Leroy Salvador	Mga Bilanggong Birhen	Señor Juan
1978 (2nd)	Mat Ranillo III	Dalawang Pugad, Isang Ibon	
1978 (2nd)	Rolly Quizon	Burlesk Queen	Jessie
1979 (3rd)
1979 (3rd)	Christopher de Leon	Ikaw ay Akin	Rex Aguilar
1979 (3rd)	Bembol Roco	Boy Pena	Boy Pana
1979 (3rd)	Dolphy	Ang Tatay Kong Nanay	Dioscoro Derecho/Coring

=== 1980s ===
Year	Actor	Film	Role
1980 (4th)
1980 (4th)	Dindo Fernando	Ikaw at Ang Gabi	
1980 (4th)	Jay Ilagan	Salawahan	Jerry
1980 (4th)	Phillip Salvador	Jaguar	Poldo
1980 (4th)	Raoul Aragon	Ina Ka ng Anak Mo	Luis
1981 (5th)
1981 (5th)	Bernardo Bernardo	City After Dark	Manay Sharon
1981 (5th)	Dindo Fernando	Langis at Tubig	Bobby Jarlego
1981 (5th)	Johnny Delgado	Brutal	Jake
1981 (5th)	Phillip Salvador	Bona	Gardo
1982 (6th)
1982 (6th)	Vic Silayan	Kisapmata	Sgt. Diosdado Carandang
1982 (6th)	Johnny Delgado	Salome	Macario
1982 (6th)	Phillip Salvador	Ako ang Hari	
1982 (6th)	Rudy Fernandez	Pepeng Shotgun	Pepe Medrano
1983 (7th)
1983 (7th)	Phillip Salvador	Cain at Abel	Lorenzo
1983 (7th)	Christopher de Leon	Cain at Abel	Ellis
1983 (7th)	Joel Torre	Oro, Plata, Mata	Miguel Lorenzo
1983 (7th)	Mark Gil	Batch '81	Sid Lucero
1983 (7th)	Vic Vargas	In This Corner	Flash Gonzaga
1984 (8th)
1984 (8th)	Phillip Salvador	Karnal	Narcing
1984 (8th)	Christopher de Leon	Broken Marriage	Rene
1985 (9th)
1985 (9th)	Jay Ilagan	Sister Stella L.	Nick Fajardo
1985 (9th)	Jay Ilagan	Soltero	Crispin Rodriguez
1985 (9th)	Phillip Salvador	Baby Tsina	Roy
1985 (9th)	Ronnie Lazaro	Boatman	Felipe
1985 (9th)	Tommy Abuel	Bukas May Pangarap	Udong
1986 (10th)
1986 (10th)	Phillip Salvador	Bayan ko: Kapit sa Patalim	Turing
1986 (10th)	Ace Vergel	Bomba Arienda	Roger "Bomba" Arienda
1986 (10th)	Aga Muhlach	Miguelito: Batang Rebelde	Miguelito/Mike
1986 (10th)	Eddie Garcia	Miguelito: Batang Rebelde	Ven Herrera
1986 (10th)	Tommy Abuel	Bakit Manipis ang Ulap	
1987 (11th)
1987 (11th)	Michael de Mesa	Unfaithful Wife	Crispin
1987 (11th)	Dan Alvaro	Bagong Hari	
1987 (11th)	Gino Antonio	Takaw Tukso	
1987 (11th)	Joel Torre	Unfaithful Wife	Fidel
1987 (11th)	Julio Diaz	Takaw Tukso	
1988
1988	The MPP decides not to give out any awards this year.		
1989 (12th)
1989 (12th)	Ace Vergel	Anak ng Cabron	Donato Rios
1989 (12th)	Christopher de Leon	Kapag Napagod ang Puso	Adrian
1989 (12th)	Mark Gil	Itanong Mo sa Buwan	Angel Asuncion
1989 (12th)	Phillip Salvador	Boy Negro	Boy Negro
1989 (12th)	Ricky Davao	Misis Mo, Misis Ko	Rafael Villanueva

=== 1990s ===
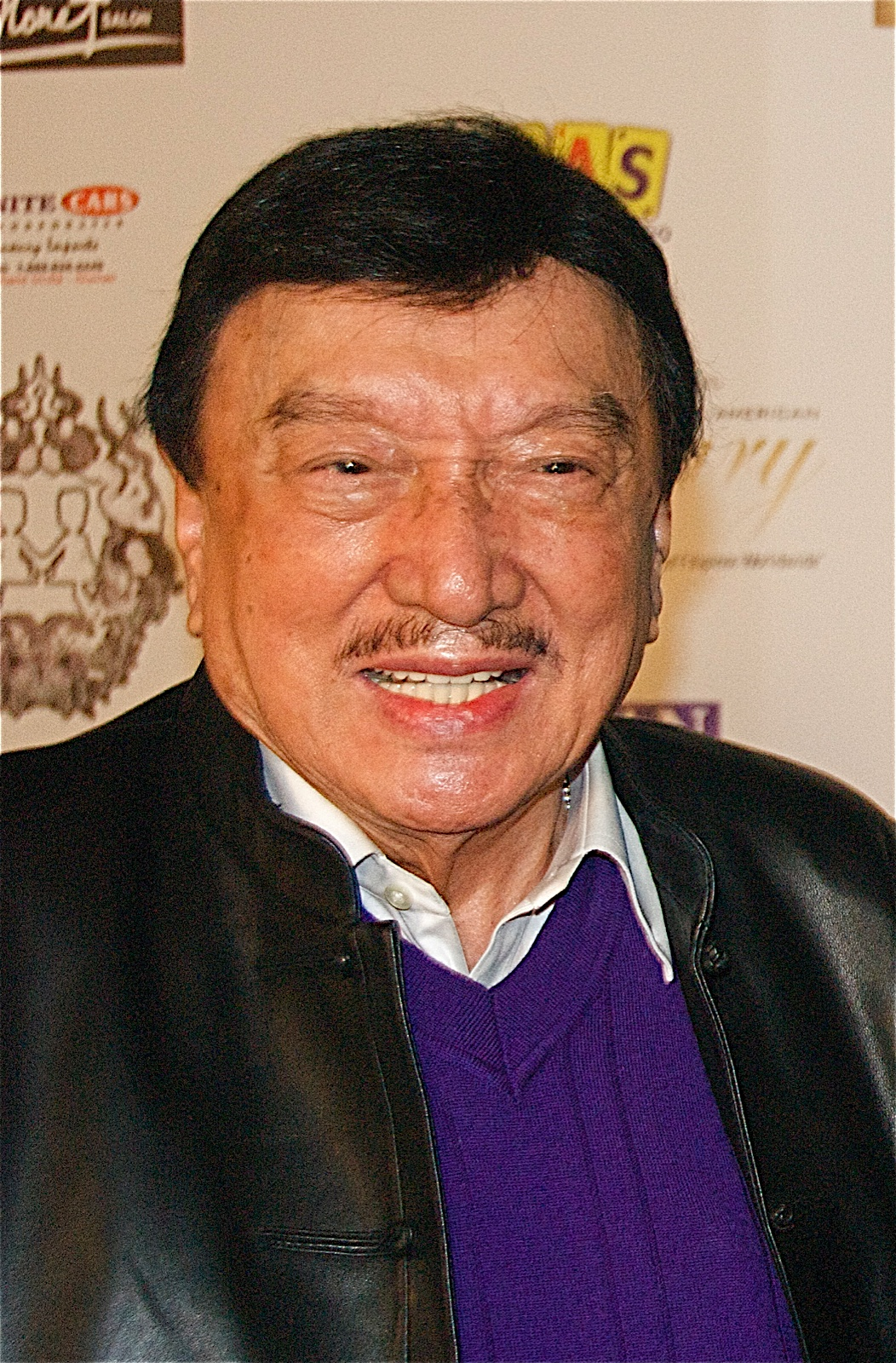
Dolphy was nominated for Gawad Best Actor in 1979 and 2001

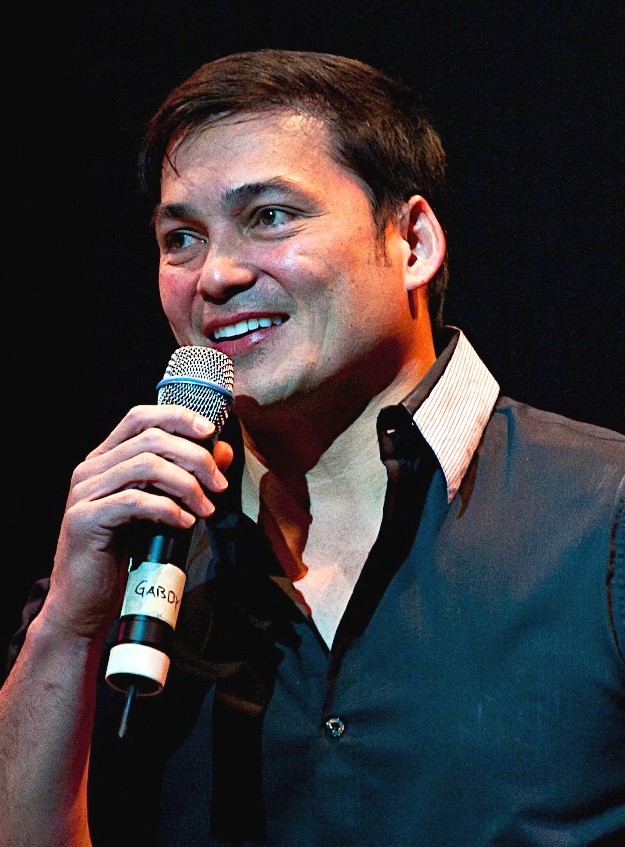
Gabby Concepcion is Gawad Urian Best Actor in 1993

Year	Actor	Film	Role
1990 (13th)
1990 (13th)	Daniel Fernando	Macho Dancer	Noel
1990 (13th)	Christopher de Leon	Imortal	Josef Alonso/Nicholas Alonso-Lopez/Basil Alonso-Lopez
1990 (13th)	Gabby Concepcion	Pahiram ng Isang Umaga	Manuel Domingo
1990 (13th)	Phillip Salvador	Joe Pring: Homicide Manila Police	Joe Pring
1990 (13th)	Tirso Cruz III	Bilangin ang mga Bituin sa Langit	Dr. Anselmo Santos/Anselmo Santos Jr.
1991 (14th)
1991 (14th)	Christopher de Leon	My Other Woman	Benjo
1991 (14th)	Gabby Concepcion	Hahamakin ang Lahat	Renato
1991 (14th)	Phillip Salvador	Ikasa Mo, Ipuputok Ko	Guiller Sta. Romana
1991 (14th)	Richard Gomez	Nagsimula sa Puso	Carlo
1991 (14th)	Rudy Fernandez	Kaaway ng Batas	Lt. Bobby Sandoval
1992 (15th)
1992 (15th)	Richard Gomez	Hihintayin Kita sa Langit	Gabriel
1992 (15th)	Aga Muhlach	Akin Ka Magdusa Man Ako	Orly
1992 (15th)	Christopher de Leon	Ipagpatawad Mo	Mike
1993 (16th)
1993 (16th)	Gabby Concepcion	Narito ang Puso Ko	Dr. Louie Chavez
1993 (16th)	Aga Muhlach	Bakit Labis Kitang Mahal	Tommy
1993 (16th)	Julio Diaz	Bayani	Andres Bonifacio
1993 (16th)	Richard Gomez	Ikaw ang Lahat sa Akin	Cesar
1993 (16th)	Ricky Davao	Apoy sa Puso	Bob
1994 (17th)
1994 (17th)	Richard Gomez	Saan Ka Man Naroon	Miguel
1994 (17th)	Aga Muhlach	May Minamahal	Carlitos
1994 (17th)	Cesar Montano	Leonardo delos Reyes: Alyas Waway	Leonardo delos Reyes/Nards
1994 (17th)	Christopher de Leon	Gaano Kita Kamahal	Rolly Suclad
1995 (18th)
1995 (18th)	Richard Gomez	Wating	Ardo
1995 (18th)	Christopher de Leon	Bakit Ngayon Ka Lang	Ramon
1995 (18th)	Phillip Salvador	Ka Hector	Ka Hector/Che/Poldo
1996 (19th)
1996 (19th)	Aga Muhlach	Sana Maulit Muli	Jerry
1996 (19th)	Jao Mapa	Pare Ko	Chipper
1996 (19th)	Jomari Yllana	Pare Ko	Mackie
1996 (19th)	Richard Gomez	Dahas	Jake
1997 (20th)
1997 (20th)	Tonton Gutierrez	Abot Kamay ang Pangarap	Roy
1997 (20th)	Eddie Garcia	Bakit May Kahapon Pa?	Gen. Valderama
1997 (20th)	Christopher de Leon	Madrasta	Edward
1997 (20th)	Raymart Santiago	Mumbaki	Dr. Joseph Dumalilon
1998 (21st)
1998 (21st)	Raymond Bagatsing	Milagros	Benneth
1998 (21st)	Albert Martinez	Rizal sa Dapitan	Jose Rizal
1998 (21st)	Joel Torre	Milagros	Junie
1998 (21st)	Noni Buencamino	Milagros	Ramonito
1998 (21st)	Patrick Garcia	Batang PX	Amboy/Christopher
1998 (21st)	Romnick Sarmenta	Damong Ligaw	Florante
1999 (22nd)
1999 (22nd)	Raymond Bagatsing	Serafin Geronimo: The Criminal of Barrio Concepcion	Serafin Geronimo
1999 (22nd)	Cesar Montano	Jose Rizal	Jose Rizal
1999 (22nd)	Eric Quizon	Pusong Mamon	Nick
1999 (22nd)	Gerald Madrid	Sana Pag-ibig Na	Mike Perez
1999 (22nd)	Ricky Davao	Ang Lalaki sa Buhay ni Selya	Ramon
1999 (22nd)	Romnick Sarmenta	Miguel/Michelle	Miguel/Michelle de la Cruz
1999 (22nd)	Ryan Eigenmann	Gangland	Kano

=== 2000s ===
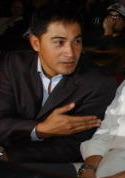
Cesar Montano is Gawad Urian Best Actor in 2005

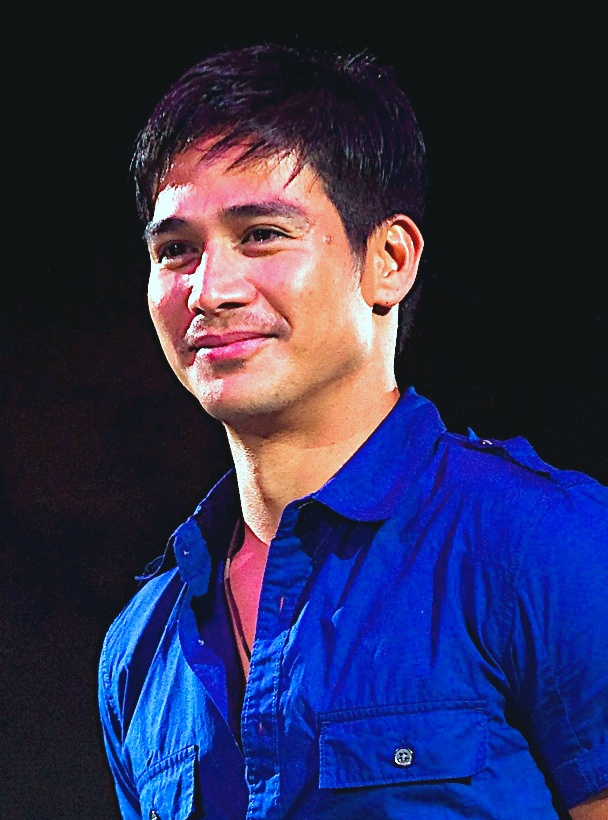
Piolo Pascual was nominated for Gawad Urian Best Actor in 2001 and 2005

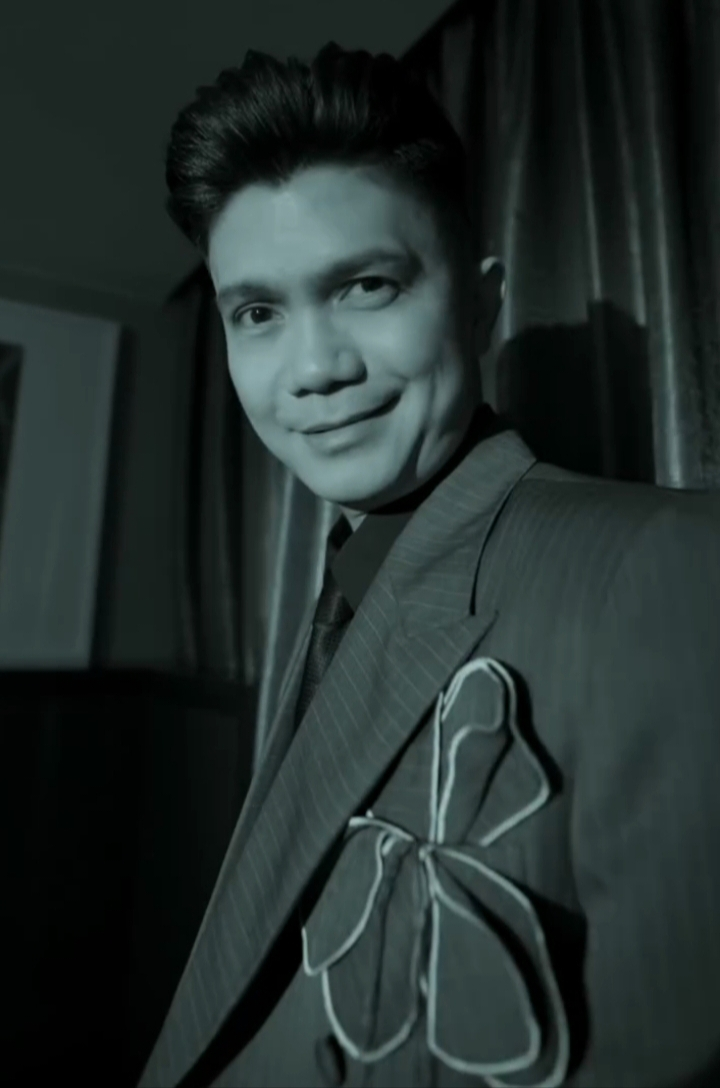
Vhong Navarro was nominated for Gawad Urian Best Actor in 2003

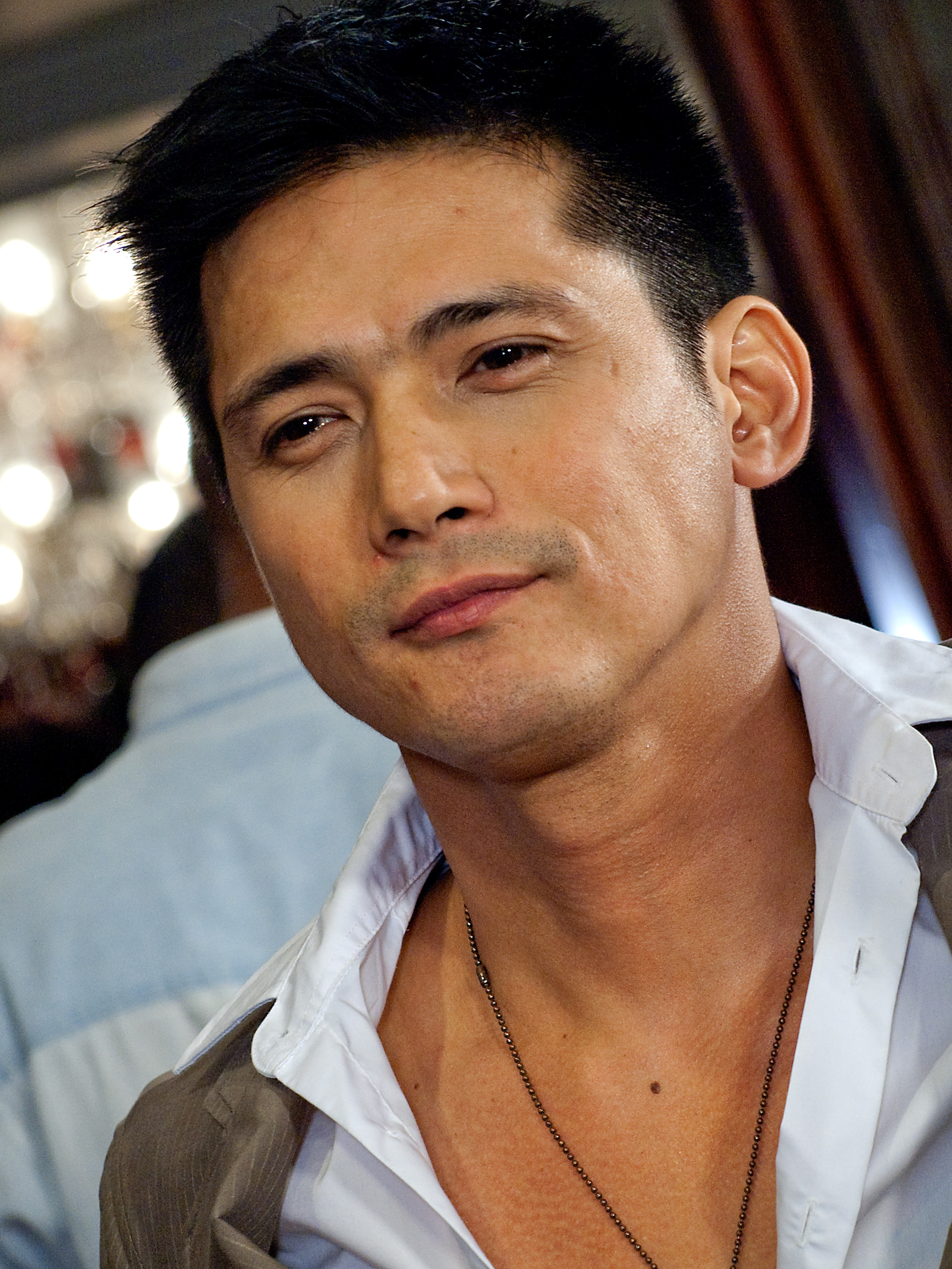
Robin Padilla is Gawad Urian Best Actor in 2006

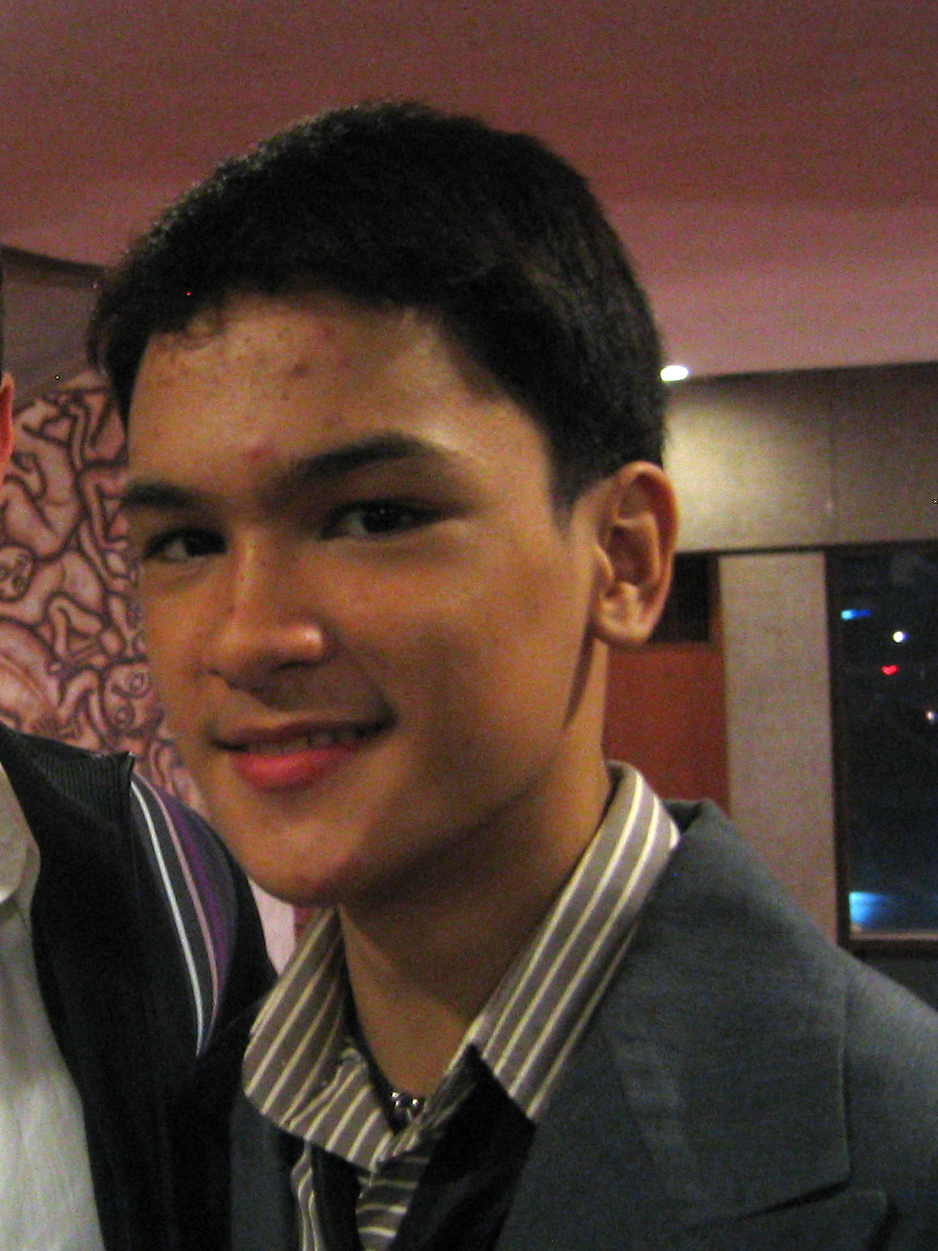
Nathan Lopez was nominated for Gawad Urian Best Actor in 2006

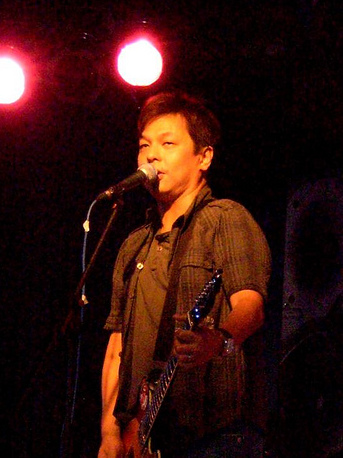
Jett Pangan was nominated for Gawad Urian Best Actor in 2007

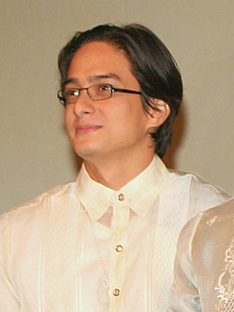
Ryan Agoncillo was nominated for Gawad Urian Best Actor in 2007

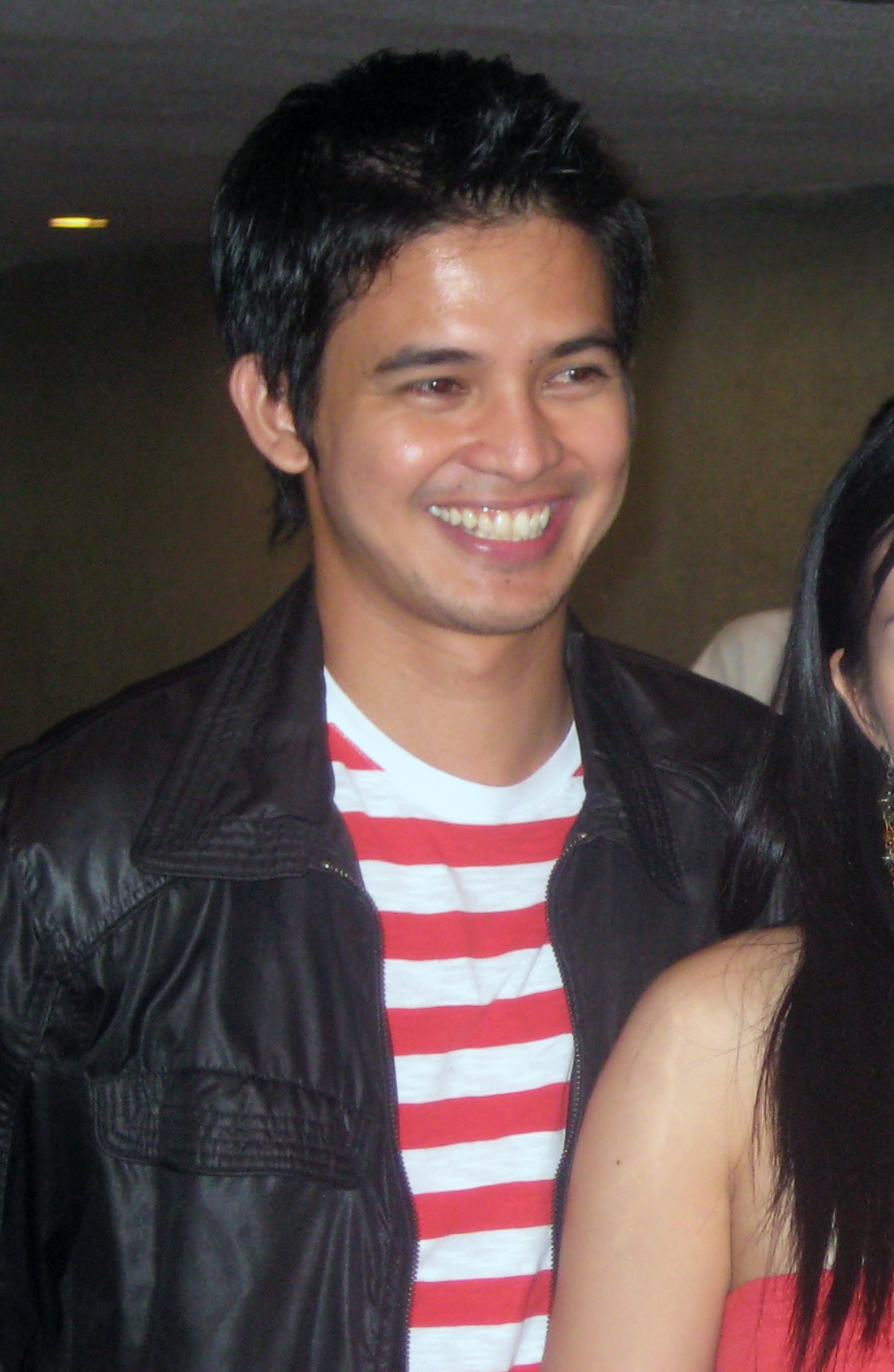
Jason Abalos is Gawad Urian Best Actor in 2008

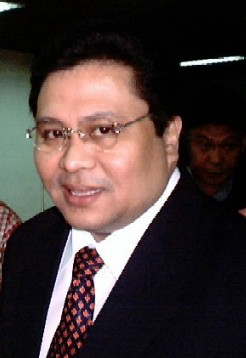
Jinggoy Estrada was nominated for Gawad Urian Best Actor in 2008

Year	Actor	Film	Role
2000 (23rd)
2000 (23rd)	Ricky Davao	Saranggola	Homer
2000 (23rd)	Allan Paule	Sa Paraiso ni Efren	Melvin
2000 (23rd)	Anton Bernardo	Sa Paraiso ni Efren	Efren
2000 (23rd)	Carlo Aquino	Kahapon May Dalawang Bata	Marlito
2000 (23rd)	Cesar Montano	Muro Ami	Fredo
2000 (23rd)	Christopher de Leon	Bulaklak ng Maynila	Timo
2000 (23rd)	Cris Villanueva	Bayaning 3rd World	Filmmaker 2
2000 (23rd)	Lester Llansang	Saranggola	Rex
2001 (24th)
2001 (24th)	Eddie Garcia	Deathrow	Lolo Sinat
2001 (24th)	Carlos Morales	Laro sa Baga	Ding
2001 (24th)	Cogie Domingo	Yakapin Mo ang Umaga	Gabby
2001 (24th)	Dante Rivero	Azucena	Teban
2001 (24th)	Dolphy	Markova: Comfort Gay	Walter Dempster Jr./Walterina Markova
2001 (24th)	Johnny Delgado	Tanging Yaman	Danny
2001 (24th)	Piolo Pascual	Lagarista	Gregory
2002 (25th)
2002 (25th)	Joel Torre	Batang West Side	Juan Mijares
2002 (25th)	Carlo Aquino	Minsan May Isang Puso	Boyet Palacios
2002 (25th)	Cesar Montano	Bagong Buwan	Ahmad Ibn Ismael
2002 (25th)	Diether Ocampo	La Vida Rosa	Dado
2002 (25th)	Mark Anthony Fernandez	Dos Ekis	Benito
2002 (25th)	Paolo Rivero	Live Show	Rolly
2002 (25th)	Ricky Davao	Minsan May Isang Puso	Simon Pacheco
2003 (26th)
2003 (26th)	Jay Manalo	Prosti	Nonoy Laki
2003 (26th)	Aga Muhlach	Kailangan Kita	Carl Diesta
2003 (26th)	Albert Martinez	Laman	Omar
2003 (26th)	Christopher de Leon	Dekada '70	Julián Bartolome, Sr.
2003 (26th)	Ricky Davao	American Adobo	Gerry
2003 (26th)	Rudy Fernandez	Diskarte	Jake
2003 (26th)	Vhong Navarro	Jologs	Kulas
2003 (26th)	Yul Servo	Laman	Dodong
2004 (27th)
2004 (27th)	Jiro Manio	Magnifico	Magnifico
2004 (27th)	Aga Muhlach	Kung Ako na Lang Sana	Vince/Enteng
2004 (27th)	Cogie Domingo	Anghel sa Lupa	Benjo
2004 (27th)	Kristoffer King	Babae sa Breakwater	Basilio
2005 (28th)
2005 (28th)	Cesar Montano	Panaghoy sa Suba	Duroy
2005 (28th)	Jomari Yllana	Minsan Pa	Jerry
2005 (28th)	Pen Medina	Ebolusyon ng Isang Pamilyang Pilipino	Kadyo
2005 (28th)	Piolo Pascual	Milan	Lino
2005 (28th)	Ronnie Lazaro	Ebolusyon ng Isang Pamilyang Pilipino	Fernando
2005 (28th)	Yul Servo	Naglalayag	Noah Garcia
2006 (29th)
2006 (29th)	Robin Padilla	La Visa Loca	Jeff Huson
2006 (29th)	Carlo Aquino	Sa Aking Pagkagising Mula sa Kamulatan	Rey
2006 (29th)	Dennis Trillo	Blue Moon	Kyle Pineda
2006 (29th)	Jaime Wilson	Big Time	Wilson
2006 (29th)	Nathan Lopez	Ang Pagdadalaga ni Maximo Oliveros	Maximo Oliveros
2006 (29th)	Rhenuel Ordoño	Ang Daan Patungong Kalimugtong	
2006 (29th)	Ricky Davao	Pusang Gala	Boyet
2006 (29th)	Yul Servo	Ilusyon	Miguel
2007 (30th)
2007 (30th)	Mark Gil	Rotonda	
2007 (30th)	Rustom Padilla	Zsa Zsa Zaturnnah Ze Moveeh	Ada
2007 (30th)	Alchris Galura	Batad: Sa Paang Palay	Ag-ap
2007 (30th)	Jett Pangan	Tulad ng Dati	Jett Pangan
2007 (30th)	Mario Magallano	Rekados	James
2007 (30th)	Ryan Agoncillo	Kasal, Kasali, Kasalo	Jerome/Jed
2007 (30th)	Sid Lucero	Donsol	Daniel
2008 (31st)
2008 (31st)	Jason Abalos	Endo	Leo
2008 (31st)	Sid Lucero	Selda	Rommel
2008 (31st)	Jerrold Tarog	Confessional	Ryan Pastor
2008 (31st)	Roeder Camañag	Death in the Land of Encantos	Benjamin Agusan
2008 (31st)	Jinggoy Estrada	Katas ng Saudi	Oca
2008 (31st)	Jiro Manio	Tambolista	Jason
2008 (31st)	Romnick Sarmenta	Prinsesa	
2008 (31st)	Shielbert Manuel	Tribu	Makoy/Sacred Brown Tribe
2009 (32nd)
2009 (32nd)	Ronnie Lazaro	Yanggaw	Junior Villacin
2009 (32nd)	Baron Geisler	Jay	Jay Santiago
2009 (32nd)	Coco Martin	Daybreak	JP
2009 (32nd)	Julian Duque	Boses	Onyok
2009 (32nd)	Neil Ryan Sese	Huling Pasada	
2009 (32nd)	Paolo Rivero	Daybreak	William
2009 (32nd)	Perry Dizon	Melancholia	Julian Tomas/Pimp
2009 (32nd)	Timothy Mabalot	Brutus, Ang Paglalakbay	Adag

=== 2010s ===
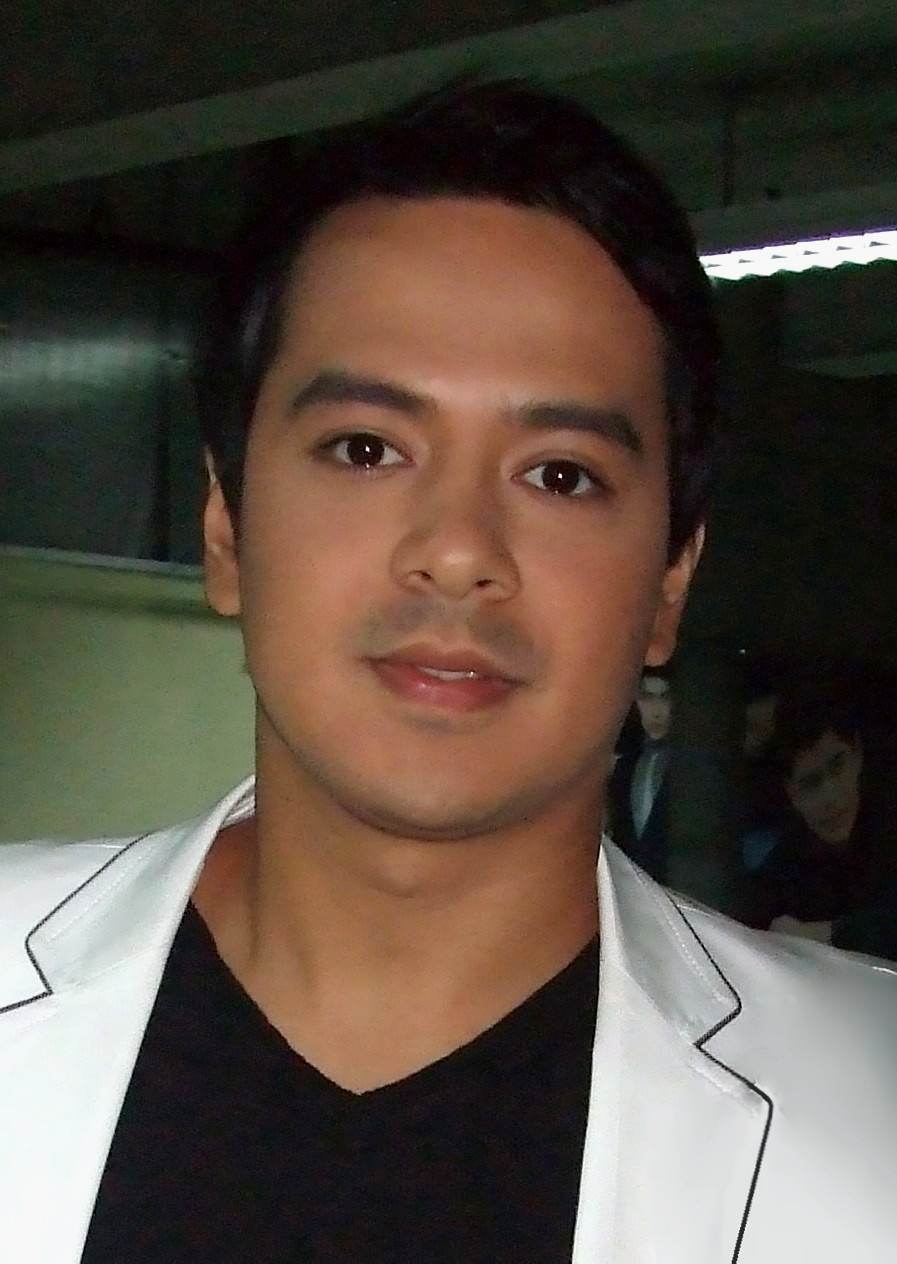
John Lloyd Cruz was nominated for Gawad Urian Best Actor in 2010. He won Best Actor in 2015

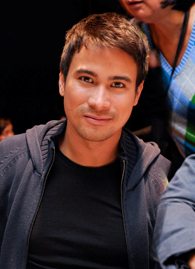
Sam Milby was nominated for Gawad Urian Best Actor in 2011

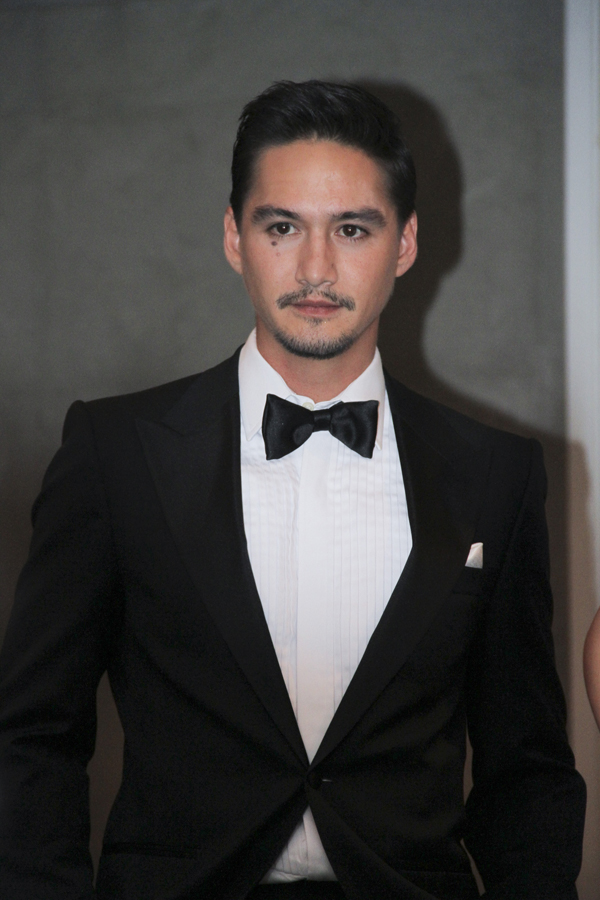
Ananda Everingham was nominated for Gawad Urian Best Actor in 2013

Year	Actor	Film	Role
2010 (33rd)
2010 (33rd)	Lou Veloso	Colorum	Pedro Trinidad
2010 (33rd)	Alfred Vargas	Colorum	Simon Madriga
2010 (33rd)	Allen Dizon	Dukot	
2010 (33rd)	Coco Martin	Kinatay	Peping
2010 (33rd)	Dwight Gaston	The Arrival	
2010 (33rd)	Felix Roco	Engkwentro	
2010 (33rd)	Jacky Woo	Walang Hanggang Paalam	Yoshi Imaizumi
2010 (33rd)	Joey Paras	Last Supper No. 3	Wilson Nañawa
2010 (33rd)	John Lloyd Cruz	In My Life	Noel Villanueva
2010 (33rd)	Raul Arellano	Himpapawid	
2011 (34th)
2011 (34th)	Sid Lucero	Muli	Jun Bernabe
2011 (34th)	Coco Martin	Noy	Manolo "Noy" Agapito
2011 (34th)	Fanny Serrano	Tarima	Roselo
2011 (34th)	Joel Torre	Amigo	Rafael
2011 (34th)	John Arcilla	Halaw	
2011 (34th)	Pen Medina	Layang Bilanggo	Paul
2011 (34th)	Perry Dizon	Sheika	Gary
2011 (34th)	Ronnie Lazaro	Ishmael	Ishmael
2011 (34th)	Sam Milby	Third World Happy	Wesley
2012 (35th)
2012 (35th)	Paulo Avelino	Ang Sayaw ng Dalawang Kaliwang Paa	Marlon
2012 (35th)	Alfred Vargas	Teoriya	
2012 (35th)	Bong Cabrera	Sa Ilalim ng Tulay	Nono
2012 (35th)	JM de Guzman	Ang Babae sa Septic Tank	Bingbong
2012 (35th)	Jess Mendoza	The Natural Phenomenon of Madness	
2012 (35th)	Kean Cipriano	Ang Babae sa Septic Tank	Rainier de la Cuesta
2012 (35th)	Martin Escudero	Zombadings 1: Patayin sa Shokot si Remington	Remington
2012 (35th)	Raymond Bagatsing	Boundary	
2012 (35th)	Ronnie Lazaro	Boundary	
2012 (35th)	TJ Trinidad	Deadline: The Reign of Impunity	Ross Rivera
2012 (35th)	Tirso Cruz III	Bisperas	
2013 (36th)
2013 (36th)	Jericho Rosales	Alagwa	Robert Lim
2013 (36th)	Adrian Sebastian	Baybayin	Bagtik
2013 (36th)	Ananda Everingham	Kalayaan	Julian
2013 (36th)	Anthony Falcon	Requieme	Joanna
2013 (36th)	Bembol Roco	Thy Womb	Bangas-An
2013 (36th)	Coco Martin	Sta. Niña	Pol
2013 (36th)	Deuel Raynon Ladia	Anac ti Pating	Sixto Mangaoang
2013 (36th)	Dominic Roco	Ang Nawawala	Gibson Bonifacio
2013 (36th)	Eddie Garcia	Bwakaw	Rene
2013 (36th)	JM de Guzman	Intoy Syokoy ng Kalye Marino	
2013 (36th)	Joem Bascon	Qwerty	Leo Concepcion
2013 (36th)	Kristoffer King	Oros	
2013 (36th)	Nico Antonio	Posas	
2014 (37th)
2014 (37th)	Joel Torre	On the Job	Mario "Tatang" Maghari
2014 (37th)	Alex Medina	Babagwa	Greg
2014 (37th)	Jhong Hilario	Badil	Lando
2014 (37th)	Mark Gil	Philippino Story	Bastian
2014 (37th)	Mimi Juareza	Quick Change	Dorina Pineda
2014 (37th)	Ping Medina	Transit	Moises
2014 (37th)	Sid Lucero	Norte, Hangganan ng Kasaysayan	Fabian
2015 (38th)
2015 (38th)	Allen Dizon	Magkakabaung	Randy
2015 (38th)	Arnold Reyes	Kasal	Sherwin
2015 (38th)	Dennis Trillo	The Janitor	Crisanto Espina
2015 (38th)	JC Santos	Esprit de Corps	Major Mac Favila
2015 (38th)	JM de Guzman	That Thing Called Tadhana	Anthony Lagdameo
2015 (38th)	Jericho Rosales	Red	Red
2015 (38th)	Nonie Buencamino	Dagitab	Jimmy Tolentino
2015 (38th)	Robert Arevalo	Hari ng Tondo	Ricardo Villena
2015 (38th)	Robin Padilla	Bonifacio: Ang Unang Pangulo	Andres Bonifacio
2015 (38th)	Sandino Martin	Esprit de Corps	Private Abel Sarmiento
2016 (39th)
2016 (39th)	John Lloyd Cruz	Honor Thy Father	Edgar
2016 (39th)	Anthony Falcon	Anino sa Likod ng Buwan	Nando
2016 (39th)	Dennis Trillo	Felix Manalo	Felix Manalo
2016 (39th)	Francis Guinto	Ari: My Life with a King	Conrado "Dado" Guinto
2016 (39th)	Jericho Rosales	#WalangForever	Ethan Isaac
2016 (39th)	John Arcilla	Heneral Luna	General Antonio Luna
2016 (39th)	John Lloyd Cruz	A Second Chance	Engr. Rodolfo "Popoy" Gonzales
2016 (39th)	Jun Jun Quintana	Water Lemon	Filemon
2016 (39th)	Lou Veloso	Da Dog Show	Sergio
2016 (39th)	Luis Alandy	Anino sa Likod ng Buwan	Joel
2016 (39th)	Ricky Davao	Dayang Asu	Peping
2016 (39th)	Sid Lucero	Apocalypse Child	Ford
2017 (40th)
2017 (40th)	Paolo Ballesteros	Die Beautiful	Trisha Echevarria / Patrick
2017 (40th)	Bembol Roco	Pauwi Na	Mang Pepe
2017 (40th)	Garry Cabalic	Paglipay	Atan
2017 (40th)	Khalil Ramos	2 Cool 2 Be 4gotten	Felix Salonga
2017 (40th)	Pepe Smith	Singing in Graveyards	Pepe The Impersonator
2017 (40th)	Ronwaldo Martin	Pamilya Ordinaryo	Aries
2017 (40th)	Tommy Abuel	Dagsin	Justino
2018 (41st)
2018 (41st)	Abra	Respeto	Hendrix
2018 (41st)	Allen Dizon	Bomba	
2018 (41st)	Empoy Marquez	Kita Kita	Tonyo
2018 (41st)	Jojit Lorenzo	Changing Partners	Alex
2018 (41st)	Justine Samson	Balangiga: Howling Wilderness	
2018 (41st)	Noel Comia, Jr.	Kiko Boksingero	
2018 (41st)	Nonie Buencamino	Smaller and Smaller Circles	Father Augusto Saenz, SJ
2018 (41st)	RS Francisco	Bhoy Intsik	
2018 (41st)	Sandino Martin	Changing Partners	Cris
2018 (41st)	Timothy Castillo	Neomanila	Toto
2019 (42nd)
2019 (42nd)	Eddie Garcia	ML	Colonel
2019 (42nd)	Carlo Aquino	Meet Me in St. Gallen	Jesse
2019 (42nd)	Christian Bables	Signal Rock	Intoy
2019 (42nd)	Dante Rivero	Kung Paano Hinihintay ang Dapithapon	Bene
2019 (42nd)	Dingdong Dantes	Sid & Aya: Not a Love Story	Sid
2019 (42nd)	Eddie Garcia	Hintayan ng Langit	Manolo
2019 (42nd)	Ketchup Eusebio	Mamang	Ferdie
2019 (42nd)	Miyuki Kamimura	Tanabata's Wife	Tanabata
2019 (42nd)	Tony Labrusca	ML	Carlo
2019 (42nd)	Victor Neri	A Short History of a Few Bad Things	Felix Tarongoy

=== 2020s ===
Year	Actress	Film	Role
2020 (43rd)
2020 (43rd)	Elijah Canlas	Kalel, 15	Kalel
2020 (43rd)	Alden Richards	Hello, Love, Goodbye	
2020 (43rd)	Gold Azeron	Metamorphosis	
2020 (43rd)	Gio Gahol	Sila-Sila	
2020 (43rd)	Jansen Magpusao	John Denver Trending	
2020 (43rd)	Joel Lamangan	Ang Hupa	
2020 (43rd)	Louis Abuel	Edward	
2020 (43rd)	Oliver Aquino	Jino to Mari	
2020 (43rd)	Raymond Bagatsing	Quezon's Game	Manuel L. Quezon
2020 (43rd)	Royce Cabrera	Fuccbois	
2021 (44th)
2021 (44th)	Nanding Josef	Lahi, Hayop	Baldo
2021 (44th)	Adrian Lindayag	The Boy Foretold by the Stars	Dominic Cruz
2021 (44th)	Elijah Canlas	He Who Is Without Sin	Martin Pangan
2021 (44th)	Enchong Dee	Alter Me	Uno
2021 (44th)	JC Santos	On Vodka, Beers, and Regrets	Francis
2021 (44th)	Keann Johnson	The Boy Foretold by the Stars	Luke Armada
2021 (44th)	Noel Escondo	Memories of Forgetting	Jim
2021 (44th)	Zanjoe Marudo	Malaya	Iago
2022 (45th)
2022 (45th)	John Arcilla	On the Job: The Missing 8	Sisoy Salas
2022 (45th)	Christian Bables	Big Night!	Dharna/Panfilo Macaspac, Jr.
2022 (45th)	Dingdong Dantes	A Hard Day	Detective Edmund Villon
2022 (45th)	Francis Magundayao	Tenement 66	Teban
2022 (45th)	John Lloyd Cruz	Historiya ni Ha	Hernando / Ha
2022 (45th)	Paolo Contis	A Faraway Land	Nico Mercado
2022 (45th)	Shogen	Gensan Punch	Naozumi "Nao" Tsuchiyama
2023 (46th)
2023 (46th)	John Lloyd Cruz	Kapag Wala nang Mga Alon	Lt. Hermes Papauran
2023 (46th)	Andrew Ramsay	Ginhawa	Anton
2023 (46th)	Baron Geisler	Doll House	Rustin Clyde Villanueva
2023 (46th)	Noel Trinidad	Family Matters	Francisco
2023 (46th)	Tommy Alejandrino	The Baseball Player	Amir
2024 (47th)
2024 (47th)	Romnick Sarmenta	About Us But Not About Us	Ericson
2024 (47th)	Carlo Aquino	Third World Romance	Alvin
2024 (47th)	Cedrick Juan	GomBurZa	Jose Burgos
2024 (47th)	Euwenn Mikaell	Firefly	Anthony "Tonton" Alvaro
2024 (47th)	Jansen Magpusao	The Gospel of the Beast	Mateo
2024 (47th)	Paolo O’Hara	Ang Duyan ng Magiting	Gabriel Ventura
2025 (48th)
2025 (48th)	Dennis Trillo	Green Bones	Domingo "Dom" Zamora
2025 (48th)	Baron Geisler	Dearly Beloved	Deo
2025 (48th)	Carlo Aquino	Crosspoint	Manuel Hidalgo
2025 (48th)	Enzo Osorio	The Hearing	Lucas
2025 (48th)	Ronnie Lazaro	Phantosmia	Hilarion Zabala
2025 (48th)	Ruru Madrid	Green Bones	Xavier Gonzaga
2025 (48th)	Sid Lucero	Outside	Francis
2026 (49th)
2026 (49th)	Carlo Aquino (tie)	Bar Boys: After School	Erik Vicencio
2026 (49th)	Jericho Rosales (tie)	Quezon	President Manuel L. Quezon
2026 (49th)	Earl Jonathan Amaba	ImPerfect	Jiro
2026 (49th)	Elijah Canlas	Rumaragasa	Eli
2026 (49th)	Jojit Lorenzo	Habang Nilalamon ng Hydra ang Kasaysayan	Kiko Consuelo
2026 (49th)	Jomari Angeles	Some Nights I Feel Like Walking	Uno
2026 (49th)	Julian Paul Larroder	Tigkiliwi	Tata
2026 (49th)	Miguel Odron	Some Nights I Feel Like Walking	Zion

== Superlatives ==
Superlative	Best Actor	
Actor with most awards	Phillip Salvador; Richard Gomez	3
Actor with most nominations	Christopher de Leon	13
Oldest Winner	Eddie Garcia	90yo
Oldest Nominee	Eddie Garcia	90yo
Youngest Winner	Jiro Manio	12yo
Youngest Nominee	Jiro Manio	12yo

== Multiple awards for Best Actor ==
Three awards

- Richard Gomez
- Phillip Salvador

Two awards

Jericho Rosales

- Eddie Garcia
- Raymond Bagatsing
- Christopher de Leon
- Sid Lucero
- Vic Silayan
- Joel Torre
