= Claudia Zobel =

Filipino actress (1964–1984)

- Born: Thelma Cabras Maloloy-on; February 27, 1964; Mandaue, Cebu, Philippines
- Died: February 10, 1984 (aged 19); Makati, Philippines
- Resting place: Queen City Memorial Gardens, Cebu City, Cebu
- Occupation: Actress
- Years active: 1981–1984

Thelma Cabras Maloloy-on (February 27, 1964 – February 10, 1984), better known by her stage name Claudia Zobel, was a Filipino actress.

Maloloy-on died in a car accident on February 10, 1984 at the Magallanes Interchange in Makati, Philippines. On August 27, 2013, 29 years after her death, Zobel's body, was exhumed to be relocated beside her father's remains. However, upon opening the casket, relatives found her body to be in a perfect mummified state, with details on her skin still clearly visible.

Zobel was portrayed by Sabrina M. (Marie Karen Pallasigue) in the 1995 film Karanasan: The Claudia Zobel Story.

== Filmography ==
=== Movies ===
Year	Title	Role
1981	Bandido sa Sapang Bato	
1982	Dancing Master 2: Macau Connection	
1983	Shame	
1984	Uhaw sa Pag-Ibig	
1984	Magdalena, Buong Magdamag	Magdalena
1984	Sinner or Saint	Dina
1984	This Is My Country (Kapit sa Patalim)	Dhalie
