= Baldo Marro =

Filipino actor, screenwriter, film director and producer (1948–2017)

- Born: Teodoro Galan Baldomaro; January 1, 1948
- Died: October 22, 2017 (aged 69); Bacoor, Cavite, Philippines
- Years active: 1971–2017

Teodoro Galan Baldomaro (January 1, 1948 – October 22, 2017), professionally known as Baldo Marro, was a Filipino actor, screenwriter, stunt director, film director and producer. He was awarded Best Actor by the Metro Manila Film Festival in 1988 for the action film Patrolman.

== Career ==
He started as stuntman before he became an action star. In 1988 Metro Manila Film Festival, Marro won Best Actor for Patrolman, which also won him the Best Director award. Marro starred in Boy Negro (1988), Iyo ang Batas, Akin ang Katarungan (1988), Tumakbo Ka... Hanggang May Lupa (1990), and Alyas Boy Tigas: Ang Probinsiyanong Wais (1998).

He directed Lito Lapid in the movies for Regal Films such as Huwag Mong Ubusin ang Bait Ko (2000), and Bukas, Babaha ng Dugo (2001), among others. He appeared in Joel Lamangan's Mamarazzi (2010).

== Death ==
Marro died on October 22, 2017 after a series of illness. He was 69. He was buried at Angelus Memorial Park in Bacoor, Cavite.

== Awards and nominations ==
| Award-giving Body | Category | Recipient | Result |
|---|---|---|---|
| 1989 Gawad Urian Awards | Best Supporting Actor (Pinakamahusay na Pangalawang Aktor) | Baldo Marro | Nominated |
| 1988 Metro Manila Film Festival | Best Actor | Baldo Marro | Won |

== Selected filmography ==
=== Film ===
==== As actor ====
| Year | Title | Role | Note(s) | Ref(s). |
|---|---|---|---|---|
| 1971 | Malupit Na Tadhana | | Credited as Teody Baldomaro | Ref(s). |
| 1973 | Ang Mahiwagang Daigdig ni Pedro Penduko | | Credited as Teody Baldomaro | |
| 1974 | Magnong Harabas | | | |
| 1974 | Murder in the Orient | | | |
| 1975 | Son of Fung Ku | | Credited as Bal Marro | |
| 1975 | Mulawin | | | |
| 1976 | Alas-5:00 ng Hapon: Gising Na ang Mga Anghel | | | |
| 1976 | Nahirit!... Nasipol!... ang Biyaheng Bikol | | "Sa Ngalan ng Pag-ibig" segment | |
| 1976 | Bitayin si... Baby Ama? | | | |
| 1976 | Markadong Anghel | | | |
| 1976 | Ikaw... Ako, Laban sa Mundo! | | | |
| 1977 | Sa Dulo ng Kris | | | |
| 1977 | Valentin Labrador | | | |
| 1977 | Gameng | | | |
| 1978 | Juan Tapak | | | |
| 1978 | Boy Pana: Terror ng Maynila, '63 | | | |
| 1978 | Joe Quintero | | | |
| 1978 | Salonga | | | |
| 1979 | Hoodlum Killer | | | |
| 1979 | Angelita... Ako ang Iyong Ina | | | |
| 1979 | Devil Dan (Stuntman for Hire) | | | |
| 1979 | Dakipin... Killers for Hire | | | |
| 1979 | Bugoy | | | |
| 1980 | Estibador | | | |
| 1980 | Palawan | | | |
| 1980 | Hoy, Tukso, Layuan Mo Ako! | | | |
| 1980 | Tatak Angustia | | | |
| 1980 | Tres Kantos | | | |
| 1980 | Tatlong Hari | | | |
| 1980 | Pangkat de Sabog | | | |
| 1981 | Kaliwete Brothers | | | |
| 1981 | Kamandag ng Rehas Na Bakal | | | |
| 1981 | Hantingan | | | |
| 1981 | Kumander Surot | | | |
| 1981 | Ako ang Hari | | | |
| 1981 | Wanted: Sabas ang Kilabot | | | |
| 1981 | Death Row | | | |
| 1981 | Lukso ng Dugo | | | |
| 1981 | Deadly Commandos | | | |
| 1981 | Harabas Is Still My Name | | | |
| 1981 | Kumusta Ka, Hudas? | | | |
| 1981 | 9 de Pebrero, Moriones, Tondo | | | |
| 1981 | Kami'y Ifugao | | | |
| 1982 | Kumander Kris | | | |
| 1982 | Alyas Big Boy | | | |
| 1982 | Kumander Elpidio Paclibar | | | |
| 1982 | Bilanggo: Prison No. 10069 | | | |
| 1982 | Get My Son Dead or Alive | Ka Lawin | | |
| 1982 | Amo | | | |
| 1982 | Akin ang Paghihiganti! | | | |
| 1982 | Vendetta | | | |
| 1982 | Krus sa Bawat Punglo | | | |
| 1983 | Destination: Cotabato | | | |
| 1983 | Mga Pusang Bundok | | | |
| 1983 | 13 Hudas | | | |
| 1983 | Tatak ng Yakuza | | | |
| 1983 | Kunin ang Ulo ni... Magtanggol! | | | |
| 1983 | Hot Property | | | |
| 1983 | Over My Dead Body | | | |
| 1984 | Pasukuin si Waway | | | |
| 1984 | Sarge | | Lead role | |
| 1984 | Ang Pagbabalik ni Dimasalang | | | |
| 1984 | Digmaan... Sa Pagitan ng Langit at Lupa | | | |
| 1985 | Rustico Acuzar... Waray | | | |
| 1985 | Baun Gang | | | |
| 1985 | Anak ng Tondo | | | |
| 1986 | Bodyguard | | Lead role | |
| 1986 | Tatlo Laban sa Bato | | | |
| 1986 | Agaw-Armas | | | |
| 1986 | Sgt. Villapando: A.W.O.L. | | | |
| 1987 | Anak ng Lupa | | | |
| 1987 | Balweg | Abraham | | |
| 1987 | Susuko Ba Ako Inay? | | | |
| 1987 | Oscar Ramos: Hitman | | | |
| 1988 | Dongalo Massacre | | | |
| 1988 | Lost Command | | | |
| 1988 | Boy Negro | Gustin | | |
| 1988 | Alega Gang: Public Enemy No.1 of Cebu | | | |
| 1988 | Iyo ang Batas, Akin ang Katarungan | Chief Rubio | | |
| 1988 | Dugo ng Pusakal | | | |
| 1988 | Pepeng Kuryente: Man with a Thousand Volts | Inmate | | |
| 1988 | Chinatown: Sa Kuko ng Dragon | | | |
| 1988 | Patrolman | | Lead role | |
| 1989 | Arrest: Pat. Rizal Alih – Zamboanga Massacre | Idris | | |
| 1989 | Alyas Boy Muslim | | | |
| 1989 | Berdugo ng Escalante | | Lead role | |
| 1989 | Bala... Dapat Kay Cris Cuenca! (Public Enemy No. 1 of Region 4) | | | |
| 1989 | Bawa't Patak... Dugong Pilipino | | | |
| 1989 | Captain Yagit | | | |
| 1990 | Hukom .45 | | | |
| 1990 | Asiong Salonga: Hari ng Tondo, 1950 | | | |
| 1990 | Alyas Pogi: Birador ng Nueva Ecija | Banjo | | |
| 1990 | Tumakbo Ka... Hanggang May Lupa | | Lead role | |
| 1991 | Leon ng Maynila: P/Col. Romeo B. Maganto, WPD-MPFF | Ka Lando | | |
| 1991 | Capt. Jaylo: Batas sa Batas | Turo Bisaya | | |
| 1991 | Amok: Patrolman 2 | | Archival footage | |
| 1991 | Manong Gang | | | |
| 1991 | Isang Milyon sa Ulo ni Cobra | | | |
| 1992 | Magsisimba Kang May Bulak są Ilong | | | |
| 1992 | Johnny Cuevas: Alyas Boy Susi | | | |
| 1992 | Alyas Joker: Sigue-Sigue 22 Commando | | Lead role | |
| 1992 | Warden | | | |
| 1993 | Dagul | P/Sgt. Godofredo 'Dagul' Bucoy | | |
| 1994 | Chinatown 2: The Vigilantes | Capt. Mike Chan | | |
| 1996 | Hanggang sa Huling Patak ng Dugo | | | |
| 1997 | Bandido | | | |
| 2001 | Duwag Lang ang Sumusuko | | | |
| 2001 | Bukas, Babaha ng Dugo | Boy Bisoy | | |
| 2003 | Utang ng Ama | Boy Yabang | | |
| 2003 | Fantastic Man | | | |
| 2004 | Hamog sa Bukang Liwayway | | | |
| 2010 | Mamarazzi | | | |
| 2011 | Amaya: The Making of an Epic | | TV documentary | |
| 2013 | Our Fate Decides | | | |
| 2014 | Da Possessed | Kumpadre | | |
| 2015 | The Last Pinoy Action King | | Documentary | |

=== As film director ===
- Galit sa Mundo (1989) - Eddie Garcia
- Tumakbo Ka... Hanggang May Lupa (1990) - Bong Revilla
- Alyas Boy Ama: Tirador (1994) - Zoren Legaspi
- Ibigay Mo ng Todong Todo (1995) - Universal Motion Dancers
- Hanggang sa Huling Patak ng Dugo (1996) - Daniel Fernando
- Leon Cordero: Duwag Lang ang Hahalik sa Lupa (1996) - Raymart Santiago
- Angel de Jesus: Masikip ang Mundo para sa Iyo (1997) - Jestoni Alarcon
- Buenavista: Kapag Dumanak ang Dugo (1997) - Raymond Keannu
- Pintado (1999) - Monsour del Rosario
- Bayolente (1999) - Zoren Legaspi
- Makamandag Na Bala (2000) - Jestoni Alarcon
- Baliktaran (2000) - Zoren Legaspi
- Pasasabugin Ko ang Mundo Mo! (2000) - Lito Lapid
- Akin ang Labang Ito (2000) - Ace Espinosa
- Huwag Mong Ubusin ang Bait Ko! (2000) - Lito Lapid
- Duwag Lang ang Sumusuko (2001) - Gary Estrada
- Masikip Na ang Mundo Mo, Labrador (2001) - Lito Lapid
- Bukas, Babaha ng Dugo (2001) - Lito Lapid
- Parola: Bilangguang Walang Rehas (2002) - Ace Espinosa
- Ligaya... Katumbas ng Buhay (2003) - Brando Legaspi
- Makamundo (2004) - Joko Diaz

=== As stuntman ===
- Makahiya at Talahib (1976) (fight instructor)
- Teritoryo Ko Ito (1979) (routine instructor)
- Ang Leon, ang Tigre, at ang Alamid (1979) (fight instructor)
- Holdup (Special Squad, D.B.) (1979) (stunt coordinator)
- Kodengo Penal: The Valderama Case (1980) (fight instructor)
- Tatak Angustia (1980) (fight instructor)
- Kamandag ng Rehas Na Bakal (1981) (routine instructor) / (stunts)
- Pepeng Shotgun (1981) (routine instructor)
- 9 de Pebrero, Moriones, Tondo (1981) (routine instructor)
- Pretty Boy Charlie (1982) (special car stunts)
- Vendetta (1982) (routine instructor)
- Kunin Mo ang Ulo ni Magtanggol (1984) (routine instructor)
- Somewhere (1984) (fight instructor)
- Baun Gang (1985) (fight instructor)
- Isusumpa Mo ang Araw Nang Isilang Ka (1986) (stunt director)
- Agaw-Armas (1986) (stunt director)
- Sgt. Villapando: A.W.O.L. (1986) (fight instructor)
- Gabi Na, Kumander (1986) (fight director)
- Anak ng Lupa (1987) (fight director)
- Balweg (1987) (action sequences)
- Boy Tornado (1987) (fight director)
- Afuang: Bounty Hunter (1988) (action director)
- Boy Negro (1988) (fight director)
- Alega Gang: Public Enemy No.1 of Cebu (1988)
- Joe Pring: Homicide Manila Police (1989) (stunt director)
- Galit sa Mundo (1989) (action director)
- Carnap King? (The Randy Padilla Story) (1989) (stunt director)
- Target... Police General (Maj. Gen. Alfredo S. Lim Story) (1989) (fight and stunt instructor)
- Urbanito Dizon: The Most Notorious Gangster in Luzon (1990) (stunt and routine director)
- Bala at Rosaryo (1990) (stunt director)
- Beautiful Girl (1990) (stunt director)
- Hukom .45 (1990) (action sequence director)
- APO: Kingpin ng Maynila (1990) (action director)
- Alyas Pogi: Birador ng Nueva Ecija (1990) (stunt director)
- Leon ng Maynila, Lt. Col. Romeo Maganto (1991) (stunt director)
- Kapitan Jaylo: Batas sa Batas (1991) (fight director)
- Alyas Pogi 2 (1991) (fight director)
- Pangako Sa'yo (1992) (fight and stunt director)
- Manong Gang (1992) (stunt director)
- Magnong Rehas (1992) (stunt director)
- Alyas Boy Kano (1992) (stunt & fight director)
- Alyas Hunyango (1992) (fight director)
- Narito ang Puso Ko (1992) (stunt director)
- Hanggang May Buhay (1992) (stunt director)
- Pacifico Guevarra: Dillinger (1992) (fights and stunts director)
- Boy Pita: Teritoryo ng Caloocan (1993) (stunts & fight director)
- Ikaw Lang (1993) (fight instructor)
- Dodong Armado (1993) (stunt director)
- Paranaque Bank Robbery (1993) (fight director)
- Lt. Madarang: Iginuhit sa Dugo (1993) (stunt director)
- Nandito Ako (1993) (stunt director)
- Ismael Zacarias (1994) (fight director)
- Iukit Mo sa Bala! (1994) (fight director)
- Costales (1995) (fight and stunt director)
- Ibigay Mo ng Todong-todo (1995) (stunt director)
- Batas Ko Ay Bala (1996) (stunts and fight director)
- Moises Arcanghel: Sa Guhit ng Bala (1996) (action director)
- Laban Ko Ito: Walang Dapat Madamay (1997) (fight director)
- Strebel: Gestapo ng Maynila (1998) (fight director)
- Walang Katumbas ang Dugo (1998) (fight director)
- Pintado (1999) (fight instructor)
- Kapag Kumukulo ang Dugo! (1999) (fight director)
- Walang Iwanan PEKSMAN! (2002) (fight director)
- You & Me: Against the World (2003) (action director)
- Utang ng Ama (2003) (fight instructor)
- Resiklo (2007) (fight director)
- And I Love You So (2009) (stunt director)
- I Love You Goodbye (2009) (stunt director)
- Ang Panday (2009) (stunts)
- Ang Darling Kong Aswang (2009) (stunt and fight director)
- Here Comes the Bride (2010) (stunt director) / (stunts)
- Si Agimat at si Enteng Kabisote (2010) (fight director)
- Bulong (2011) (fight director)
- No Other Woman (2011) (stunt director)
- Ang Panday 2 (2011) (fight/stunt director)
- Born to Love You (2012) (stunt director)
- The Trial (2014) (stunt director)
- Past Tense (2014) (stunt director)
- Muslim Magnum .357: To Serve and Protect (2014) (fight director)
- The Amazing Praybeyt Benjamin (2014) (fight director)
- Crazy Beautiful You (2015) (stunt director)
- Para sa Hopeless Romantic (2015) (stunt director)
- How to Be Yours (2016) (stunt director)

== See also ==
- Dante Varona
- Dan Alvaro
