= Kaaway Hanggang Hukay =

Philippine action film

- Official movie poster
- Directed by: Joey del Rosario
- Written by: Humilde "Meek" Roxas
- Produced by: Ramon Salvador
- Starring: Phillip Salvador; Ina Raymundo; Edu Manzano
- Cinematography: Val Dauz
- Edited by: Renato de Leon
- Music by: Edwin Ortega
- Production company: RS Productions
- Distributed by: RS Productions
- Release date: March 7, 2001
- Running time: 105 minutes
- Country: Philippines
- Languages: Filipino; English

Kaaway Hanggang Hukay (transl. Enemy to the Pit) is a 2001 Philippine action film directed by Joey del Rosario. The film stars Phillip Salvador, Ina Raymundo and Edu Manzano.

== Cast ==
- Phillip Salvador as Col. Baltazar Soriano
- Ina Raymundo as Lt. Barbara Veloso
- Edu Manzano as Col. Carlos Ricarte
- Robert Arevalo as Lt. Gen. George L. Montoya
- Bob Soler as Col. Ricarte
- Perla Bautista as Mamang
- Denver Razon as Andy
- Dindo Arroyo as Akbar Ahmed
- Paula Gomez as Bianca
- Gamaliel Viray as Sen. Raul Montoya
- Ernie Zarate as Roland Canlas
- Sauro Cotoco as Prime Minister

== Production ==
The film had a working title Ikaw o Ako. The current title was suggested by the late Fernando Poe Jr., who stated that it suits the film's main conflict. Principal photography for the film, which lasted for several months, began while Phillip Salvador was almost done shooting for Pag Oras Mo, Oras Mo Na.

Produced by Ramon Salvador, it was slated to be distributed by Millennium Cinema. However, Millennium closed shop at the start of 2001 while the film was under post-production. Salvador released it to theaters independently in March that year.

== Awards ==
| Year | Awards | Category | Recipient | Result | Ref. |
|---|---|---|---|---|---|
| 2002 | 20th FAP Awards | Best Director | Joey del Rosario | Nominated | |
| 2002 | 20th FAP Awards | Best Screenplay | Humilde "Meek" Roxas | Nominated | |
