= Lucita Soriano =

Filipino actress

- Born: Lucita Soriano Adriano; July 13, 1940; Taguig, Philippines
- Died: July 8, 2015 (aged 74); Quezon City, Philippines
- Occupation: Actress
- Years active: 1958–2015
- Spouses: Rodolfo "Boy" Garcia (m. 1968; died 1997) Michael Mayr (m. 2009; died 2015)
- Children: 2 sons (with Garcia)

Lucita Soriano (born Lucita Soriano Adriano; July 13, 1940 – July 8, 2015) was a Filipino actress, who appeared in more than 215 movies and television shows. She was runner-up in the Miss Philippine Press Photography (PPP) 1964 beauty pageant.

== Career ==
Her first film contract was with Premiere Productions. She had a movie for a bit player role as one of the many women of Romeo Vasquez in Lover Boy (1958). Soriano's big break in the movies came when she auditioned for the movie I Believe (1961). In 1965, she did Pasko ng Limang Magdalena with Divina Valencia, Daisy Romualdez, Ruby Regala and Miriam Jurado. In 1967, she did Ako... Laban sa Lipunan. Her knowledge of karate won her a role in The Lady With An Iron Fist. She was FAMAS Award nominee for Best Supporting Actress in Dugo Ang Kulay ng Pag-ibig (1966). In And God Smiled at Me (1972), she won the Quezon City Film Festival Best Supporting Actress Award. She appeared in Valiente and Pangako Sa 'Yo.

== Personal life ==
Soriano was born in Taguig to Eugenio and Elvira (Jamon Soriano) Adriano, and spent her early years in Pateros. Lucita Soriano attended elementary school in Taguig and completed her high school at Rizal High School. She studied at the University of the East and tried to earn a bachelor's degree, but her busy shooting schedule prevented her from finishing college.

When Soriano was paired with Rodolfo "Boy" Garcia in a film, they fell in love. They married in 1968. They had two sons, former members of That's Entertainment, actors Garry Clint Garcia and Marco Polo Garcia. Marco Polo, an actor and a regular on That's Entertainment, predeceased his mother, dying from cirrhosis of the liver in 2010. She was widowed on July 17, 1997. In 2009, she married Michael Mayr, a retired American civil engineer, whom she met during Bible study sessions.

== Death ==
Soriano died at the Pacific Global Medical Center, Quezon City, Philippines on July 8, 2015, where she was earlier admitted to the intensive care unit. She was interred at the Garden of Memories Memorial Park in Pateros.

== Filmography ==
=== Film ===
Year	Title	Role	Note(s)
1958	Alembong		
1961	Sakristan Mayor		
1968	Ngitngit ng Pitong Whistle Bomb	Divi	
1969	Danny Boy	Dolores del Rio	
1971	Robina	Merced	
1972	And God Smiled at Me	Olga	
1976	Bitayin si... Baby Ama?	Mother of Minda	
1977	Mr. Wong and the Bionic Girls		
1978	Katawang Alabok	Marta	
1979	Stepsisters	Claudia	
1979	Alas at Reyna	Bella	
1980	Uhaw sa Kalayaan	Matilde	
1980	Katorse	Nena	
1980	Wild Animal	Ralphie's mother	
1980	Waikiki: Sa Lupa ng Ating Mga Pangarap	Lucy	
1981	Ang Babaing Hinugot sa Aking Tadyang	Mother of Proserphine	
1981	Ex-Wife		
1981	Bata Pa Si Sabel	Choleng Campos	
1982	Johnny Tanggo	Lucing	
1982	Diary of Cristina Gaston	Pacing	
1982	I Love You, I Hate You	Millie	
1983	Johnny Tanggo Rides Again... Tatanga-tanga, Dakila Naman	Lucing	
1983	To Mama with Love	Delia	
1984	May Lamok sa Loob ng Kulambo	Elvie	
1984	This Is My Country	Turing's sister	
1984	May Daga sa Labas ng Lungga	Mrs. Manny Velez	
1984	Ang Padrino	Lita Quintiliano	
1985	Lalakwe	Doña Amanda	
1985	Ben Tumbling (A People's Journal Story)	Baby	
1985	Escort Girls		
1985	Mama Said, Papa Said, I Love You!	Mimi	
1985	Tinik sa Dibdib	Aling Diday	
1986	Johnny Rocky Tanggo Part IV	Lucing	
1986	Horsey-Horsey: Tigidig-Tigidig	Evita	
1986	Kiri		
1986	Inday Inday sa Balitaw	Doray	
1986	Bagets Gang	Honesta de Vera	
1987	Tagos ng Dugo	Sonia	
1987	Stolen Moments	Jocelyn	
1987	Balweg	Ka Minda	
1987	Maria Went to Town	Osang	
1987	Black Magic		
1988	Afuang: Bounty Hunter	Baldoza's wife	
1988	Alyas Pusa: Ang Taong May 13 Buhay	Brando's mother	
1988	Penoy Balut	Jenny's mother	
1988	Ang Supremo		
1988	Sgt. Ernesto 'Boy' Ybañez: Tirtir Gang	Coching	
1988	Sa Akin Pa Rin ang Bukas	Noemi's mother	
1988	Petrang Kabayo at ang Pilyang Kuting	Anyang	
1988	Macho Dancer		
1988	Sa Puso Ko, Hahalik ang Mundo	Mother	
1988	Pepeng Kuryente: Man with a Thousand Volts	Mang Doro's wife	
1989	Hindi Pahuhuli ng Buhay	Aling Dolor	
1989	SuperMouse and the Robo-Rats	Mother of Mickey	
1989	Boots Oyson: Sa Katawan Mo, Aagos ang Dugo	Aling Clara	
1989	Tupang Itim		
1990	Kahit Konting Pagtingin	Teresa	
1990	"Ako ang Batas" -Gen. Tomas Karingal		
1990	Gumapang Ka sa Lusak	Jonathan's mother	
1990	Mula Paa Hanggang Ulo	Aling Senyang	
1990	Petrang Kabayo 2 (Anong Ganda Mo! Mukha Kang Kabayo)	Old Andrea	
1990	Alyas Pogi: Birador ng Nueva Ecija	Aling Senyang	
1990	Biktima	Tia Edad	
1990	Inosente	Dolora	
1990	Bikining Itim	Sepa	
1991	Takas sa Impierno	Aling Minyang	
1991	Hinukay Ko na ang Libingan Mo	Laroza's wife	
1992	Nympa sa Putikan	Zoila's mother	
1992	Hiram na Mukha	Aling Azon	
1992	Aguila at Guerrero: Droga Terminators	Mother of Guerrero	
1992	Big Boy Bato: Kilabot ng Kankaloo	Polly	
1992	Canary Brothers ng Tondo	Tinay's aunt	
1992	Gobernador	Kanor's wife	
1992	Amang Capulong: Anak ng Tondo Part 2	Gabriela	
1992	Lakay		
1993	Kapag Iginuhit ang Hatol ng Puso	New tenant	
1993	Padre Amante Guerrero	Hostage	
1993	Kailan Dalawa ang Mahal?	Luisa's Mother	
1994	General Tapia: Sa Nagbabagang Lupa	Sahiya	
1994	Biboy Banal: 'Pag Ganti Ko, Tapos Kayo!	Gina's mother	
1994	Baby Paterno: Dugong Pulis	Baby's auntie	
1994	Bala at Lipistik	Marita	
1995	Bunso: Isinilang Kang Palaban!	Mother of Reden	
1995	Muling Umawit ang Puso	Mameng	
1995	Iligpit si Bobby Ortega: Markang Bungo 2	Mrs. Miranda	
1996	Nights of Serafina	Diana's mother	
1996	Humanda Ka... Babalikan Kita!	Sela	
1997	T.G.I.S.: The Movie	Saling	
1997	Pablik Enemi 1 n 2: Aksidental Heroes	Luis' mother	
1997	Sgt. Victor Samson: Akin ang Batas	Madam Lucy	
1998	Sgt. Hidalgo: Bala ng Katarungan	Mother of Angela	
1998	My Guardian Debil	Aling Mila	
1998	Dr. X on the Air	Mrs. de Liryo	
1998	Kahit Mabuhay Kang Muli	Mother	
1998	Curacha: Ang Babaeng Walang Pahinga	Zusette	
1998	Cariño Brutal	Esperanza's mother	
1998	Ginto't Pilak	Mother Superior	
1998	Ang Maton at ang Showgirl	Aling Rosa	
1998	Babae sa Bintana		
1999	Tatapatan Ko ang Lakas Mo	Aling Nati	
1999	Ibibigay Ko ang Lahat	Ata	
1999	Ang Boyfriend Kong Pari	The mother	
2000	Mahal Kita, Walang Iwanan!	Eric's mom	
2000	Burador: Ang Babaing Sugo	Vice-President Lorna Z. Madrigal	
2000	Ping Lacson: Super Cop	Lady mourner	
2002	Buko Pandan	Inana	
2002	Lapu-Lapu	Mother of Katulanga	
2003	Woman of Breakwater	Aning	
2014	Alibughang Anak		

- Alembong (1958)
- Little Lucy (1961)
- Mga Manugang ni Drakula (1963)
- Dolpong Scarface: Agent 1-2-3 (December 15, 1964)
- Dr. Yes (1965)
- Pepe En Pilar (1966)
- Solo Flight (February 19–28, 1967)
- Masters of Karate (1968)
- Mga Hagibis (1970)
- Ito ang Tunay Na Lalaki (1973)

=== Television ===
Year	Title	Role
1995–1996	Familia Zaragoza	Trinidad "Trining" Lagrimas
1999–2000	Labs Ko si Babe	Anita Kalayaan

- Valiente (TV series) (1992–1997)
- Familia Zaragoza (TV series) (1995)
- Mga Anino Sa Balon (TV movie) (1997)
- Maalaala Mo Kaya – Sugat (1998)
- Pangako sa 'Yo (TV series) (2000–2002)
- Maalaala Mo Kaya – Cap (2009)
