= Cain and Abel (1982 film) =

1982 action drama film by Lino Brocka

Cain at Abel
- Official movie poster
- Directed by: Lino Brocka
- Written by: Ricky Lee
- Produced by: Benjamin G. Yalung
- Starring: Christopher de Leon; Phillip Salvador; Mona Lisa; Carmi Martin; Cecille Castillo; Baby Delgado
- Cinematography: Conrado Baltazar
- Edited by: Efren Jarlego
- Music by: Max Jocson
- Production company: Cine Suerte
- Distributed by: Cine Suerte
- Release dates: September 18, 1982 (SSIFF); October 8, 1982 (Philippines)
- Running time: 112 minutes
- Country: Philippines
- Language: Filipino

Cain and Abel (Filipino: Cain at Abel) is a 1982 Philippine action thriller drama film directed by Lino Brocka from a written story and screenplay by Ricardo "Ricky" Lee. Inspired by the Biblical story of two brothers, Christopher de Leon and Phillip Salvador respectively played the roles of Ellis and Lorenzo, the two brothers and sons of Senyora Pina (Mona Lisa), who have different views on each other. However, the sibling rivalry became violent and bloody due to the issue of inheritance of their family land and Senyora Pina's favoritism to her younger son. It also stars Carmi Martin as Zita, Ellis's fiancée from Manila; Cecille Castillo as Rina, the house helper, and Ellis's other woman; and Baby Delgado as Becky, Lorenzo's wife.

Produced and distributed by Cine Suerte, the film was first premiered in Spain on September 18, 1982, as the first Philippine entry for the San Sebastián International Film Festival. It was later released theatrically in the Philippines on October 8, 1982. The film was digitally restored and remastered by ABS-CBN Film Restoration Project and Central Digital Lab in 2016; the restored version premiered on August 11, 2016.

== Plot ==
Lorenzo, the eldest son of Donya Pina, returns home tipsy from a drinking party in the countryside and starts asking his mother about the idea of buying tractors for the farm. However, his mother refuses, citing that the farmers of the plantation would slack off. The conversation between Lorens and his mother turns into an argument after he threatens her. The following day, Ellis, the youngest son, returns home from his studies in Manila. He brings his classmate Zita, who will spend her vacation at the household. Later, while Ellis entertains his family, Lorens returns and sees his brother suspiciously due to his envy towards him and his mother's favoritism towards Ellis.

At dinnertime, Ellis begins to notice his room was used. Lorens replies that he used it for his sons. The questioning causes a small argument between the two brothers, but their mother puts a stop to it. A few hours later, Lorens goes to the nightclub where he converses with his friends about his brother Ellis and Senyora Pina. While Senyora Pina mentions her planned will, Ellis wants the land to be his, and according to the matriarch, Lorens brought problems to the family, citing his mismanagement of the family plantation. As they continue talking, Ellis tells his mother that he had decided to drop out of college and wants to marry Zita. Senyora Pina agrees with Ellis's requests, despite her criticism of Zita.

== Cast ==
Main cast

- Christopher de Leon as Ellis Laurente
- Phillip Salvador as Lorenzo "Lorens" Laurente

Supporting roles

- Mona Lisa as Senyora Pina Laurente
- Carmi Martin as Zita
- Cecille Castillo as Rina
- Baby Delgado as Becky
- Ruel Vernal as Jumbo
- Michael Zandico as Robert
- Venchito Galvez as Pilo
- Tonio Gutierrez as Robert's Group #1
- Bey Vito as Robert's Group #2
- Joseph Jardinazo as Tikboy
- Fred Capulong
- Zandro Zamora as Rene
- Jumbo Salvador as Lolit
- Greg Sta. Ines as Celso
- Naty Mallares as Lola Upe
- Dante Balois as Dante
- Jonathan Romulo
- Roger Moring
- Eddie Ortega
- SOS Daredevils
- Ryan Soler as Jimboy
- James Acuesta as Alvaro
- Baby Shanny as Baby
- Grace Torres

== Production credits ==
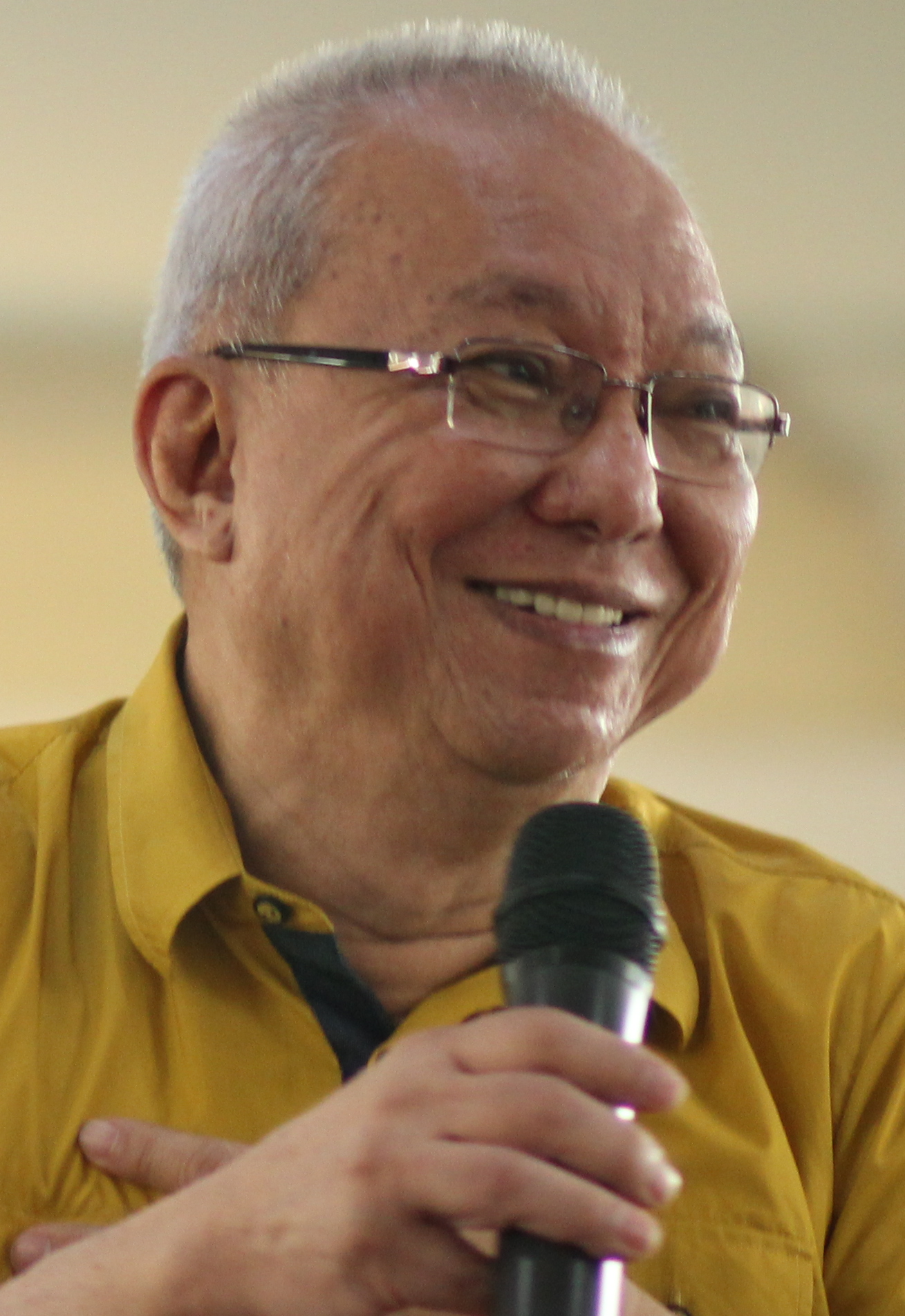
Ricky Lee (pictured in 2018) served as writer of the film.

=== Casting ===
According to now-former actor Ryan Soler in an exclusive interview from Philippine Entertainment Portal, the film Cain at Abel served as his first foray into the show business field, before landing roles in TV programs like Anna Liza and Lovingly Yours, Helen.

== Release ==
=== Theatrical ===
The film was released in the Philippines on October 8, 1982, by Cine Suerte.

==== Overseas releases ====
Cain at Abel was part of the official film entries for the 1982 San Sebastián International Film Festival, premiered on September 18, 1982. It was also screened in Japan on March 15, 1997, as one of the Filipino films exhibited by The Japan Foundation in Tokyo and February 6, 1998, as part of the Lino Brocka retrospective exhibition in Fukuoka.

=== Restoration ===
The restoration of Cain at Abel was made possible by the cooperation of ABS-CBN Film Restoration Project and the Philippine post-production company Central Digital Lab. Before the restoration project transitioned to digital scans of the films held at the ABS-CBN Film Archives in 4K resolution, starting with Cain at Abel, the films were scanned digitally in high definition (HD). Also, this film is the very first Lino Brocka to be restored and remastered by the network's restoration project.

The restoration team of ABS-CBN used the 35mm negative film print of the film that was held in their archives as the source element for the digital restoration. However, due to censorship reasons, the scenes depicting Cita's rape and eventual death were removed from the negative. The 35mm negative was digitally scanned first in 4K resolution before going to digital restoration in 2K resolution. The digital restoration of Cain at Abel was completed in 2016.

The restored version of Cain at Abel premiered on August 11, 2016, at the Tanghalang Aurelio Tolentino in the Cultural Center of the Philippines, as part of the Digital Classics section for the Cinemalaya Philippine International Film Festival. The premiere was attended by the film's writer Ricky Lee; stars Phillip Salvador, Cecille Castillo, and Carmi Martin; Danilo Brocka, the director's brother; and Evangeline Bocobo and Celine Beatrice Fabie, Mona Lisa's respective daughter and granddaughter.

=== Home media ===
The film was released by Kani Releasing (under license to ABS-CBN's Star Home Video and Star Cinema) on Blu-ray on February 22, 2022.

== Reception ==
=== Critical reception ===
Ian Jane from Rock! Shock! Pop! found problems with the film's pacing but was praised for its plot, production values, and acting performances of the cast. Jay Cruz of Sinegang PH gave the film 3.5 out of 5 stars and describes the film as "largely melodramatic and gung ho on the surface".

=== Accolades ===
Year	Award-Giving Body	Category	Recipient	Result
1983	FAP Awards	Best Actor	Phillip Salvador	Won
1983	FAMAS Award	Best Picture	Cain at Abel	Won
1983	FAMAS Award	Best Child Actor	Ryan Soler	Won
1983	FAMAS Award	Best Director	Lino Brocka	Nominated
1983	FAMAS Award	Best Actor	Phillip Salvador	Nominated
1983	FAMAS Award	Best Actress	Mona Lisa	Nominated
1983	FAMAS Award	Best Supporting Actress	Cecille Castillo	Nominated
1983	Gawad Urian Awards	Best Actor	Phillip Salvador	Won
1983	Gawad Urian Awards	Best Actor	Christopher de Leon	Nominated
1983	Gawad Urian Awards	Best Direction	Lino Brocka	Nominated
1983	Gawad Urian Awards	Best Supporting Actress	Baby Delgado	Won
1983	Gawad Urian Awards	Best Supporting Actress	Mona Lisa	Nominated
1983	Gawad Urian Awards	Best Cinematography	Conrado Baltazar	Nominated
1983	Gawad Urian Awards	Best Editing	Efren Jarlego	Nominated
1983	Gawad Urian Awards	Best Music	Max Jocson	Nominated
