= This Is My Country (film) =

1984 drama film by Lino Brocka

- Theatrical release poster
- Directed by: Lino Brocka
- Written by: Jose F. Lacaba
- Based on: A Strike by Jose F. Lacaba; Host or Hostage by Jose Carreon
- Produced by: Véra Belmont
- Starring: Phillip Salvador
- Cinematography: Conrado Baltazar
- Edited by: Ike Jarlego Jr.; Roberto Yujeco; Hero Reyes
- Music by: Jess Santiago
- Production companies: Malaya Films; Stéphan Films
- Release dates: May 17, 1984 (Cannes); November 6, 1985 (Philippines)
- Running time: 108 minutes
- Countries: Philippines; France
- Language: Filipino

This Is My Country (Filipino: Bayan Ko: Kapit sa Patalim) is a 1984 Philippine drama film directed by Lino Brocka from a story and screenplay written by Jose F. Lacaba. Starring Phillip Salvador, the film follows a struggling printing press worker who became desperate after his wife gave birth, but was forced not to join the labor strike. It features a supporting cast including Gina Alajar, Venchito Galvez, Paquito Diaz, Nomer Son, Rez Cortez, and Claudia Zobel in one of her last films before she died in a car accident.

Produced by Malaya Films and Stéphan Films, the film was first premiered on May 17, 1984, as part of the main competition at the 37th Cannes Film Festival. It was commercially released in the Philippines on November 6, 1985, but performed poorly at the box office. It was selected as the Philippine entry for the Best Foreign Language Film at the 58th Academy Awards, but was not nominated.

== Plot ==
Arturo "Turing" Manalastas (Phillip Salvador), together with his wife, Luz (Gina Alajar), works in a printing press. Turing is forced to ask his boss for a raise after his wife becomes pregnant. Turing's boss asks him to sign a waiver that he is not a member of any labor union. Shortly after, his friends invite him to be part of a labor union that they are planning to form, but Turing has no option but to refuse due to his waiver. Turing is badly treated and is called a traitor after refusing to join. The printing press later closes, and Luz is unable to get discharged from the hospital where she is confined due to pending fees. Turing needs money to pay the hospital bill so Luz can finally get out of the hospital, and turns to crime to raise it.

== Cast ==
- Phillip Salvador as Turing: A printing press worker who
- Gina Alajar as Luz: Turing's wife
- Venchito Galvez as Ka Ador: A long-time printing press worker who led the union strike
- Ariosto Reyes Jr. as Willy: One of the workers who was unceremoniously fired by Mr. Lim
- Bey Vito as Binggo
- Aida Carmona as Aling Fely
- Nomer Son as Mr. Lim: The owner of the printing press
- Paquito Diaz as Hugo: The overseer of the printing press
- Jess dela Paz as a security guard
- Lorli Villanueva as Mrs. Lim: The owner's wife
- Raoul Aragon as Lando
- Rez Cortez as Boy Echas
- Fred Capulong as Poks
- Jippi Reyes as Gonzalo
- Roger Moring as Roger
- Fred Param as Police Major
- Claudia Zobel as Dhalie
- Carmi Martin as Carla
- Lucita Soriano as Turing's sister
- Mona Lisa as Turing's mother
- Joe Taruc as himself
- Khryss Adalia as Manggagawa

== Production ==
French filmmaker Pierre Rissient supervised the film's sound design.

== Naming ==
The native name of the film, "Bayan Ko: Kapit sa Patalim" was derived from "Bayan Ko", a protest song and "Kapit sa Patalim" (Gripping onto a Blade) came from the Filipino saying "Ang taong nagigipit, kahit sa patalim kumakapit" (A desperate person will even grip onto a blade).

== Release ==
The film included actual footage of demonstrations which censors used as the reason to prevent the film being screened in the Philippines. Director Lino Brocka appealed the Supreme Court to let the film be screened in the country. A year after its screening at the Cannes Film Festival, it was allowed to be screened in the Philippines on November 6, 1985 after it was given an R rating by the newly created Movie and Television Review and Classification Board (MTRCB), and it performed poorly at the box office.

The film was restored in 2020 by Le Chat Qui Fume from the original 35mm camera negatives in 4K resolution. The restored film was premiered on the Cannes Classic section during the 2020 Cannes Film Festival. It was then released on Blu-ray and UHD Blu-ray in 2021.

== Accolades ==
Group	Category	Name	Result
Gawad Urian Award	Best Film	This Is My Country	Won
Gawad Urian Award	Best Director	Lino Brocka	Nominated
Gawad Urian Award	Best Screenplay	Jose "Pete" Lacaba	Won
Gawad Urian Award	Best Actor	Phillip Salvador	Won
Gawad Urian Award	Best Actress	Gina Alajar	Won
Gawad Urian Award	Best Supporting Actor	Venchito Galvez	Nominated
Gawad Urian Award	Best Supporting Actor	Ariosto Reyes Jr.	Nominated
Gawad Urian Award	Best Supporting Actress	Mona Lisa	Nominated
Gawad Urian Award	Best Cinematography	Conrado Baltazar	Nominated
Gawad Urian Award	Best Editing	Ike Jarlego Jr.	Nominated
Gawad Urian Award	Best Production Design	Joey Luna	Nominated
Gawad Urian Award	Best Sound Supervision	Pierre Rissient	Nominated
Catholic Mass Media Award	Best Actor	Phillip Salvador	Won
