= Balweg =

1987 action film starring Phillip Salvador

- Directed by: Antonio Perez
- Written by: Amado Lacuesta Jr.
- Produced by: Ramon Salvador
- Starring: Phillip Salvador
- Cinematography: Sergio Lobo
- Edited by: Ike Jarlego Jr.; George Jarlego; Augusto Salvador
- Music by: Willy Cruz (also director); Eddie Munji
- Production company: Viva Films
- Release date: July 8, 1987
- Country: Philippines
- Language: Filipino

Balweg (marketed as Balweg, the Rebel Priest) is a 1987 Filipino biographical action drama film directed by Antonio Perez. Inspired by the life of Catholic priest turned communist rebel Conrado Balweg, it stars Phillip Salvador as the eponymous rebel, alongside Rio Locsin, Tetchie Agbayani, Johnny Delgado, Pinky Amador, Jose Romulo, Mon Godiz, Bebong Osorio, Eddie Infante, and Baldo Marro. Produced by Viva Films, Balweg was released on July 8, 1987, and was a box office success. Phillip Salvador won both the FAMAS Award and the Film Academy of the Philippines Award for Best Actor.

The film received negative reviews from critics, who deemed it an "opportunistic" film which excessively depicts Balweg as a "larger-than-life hero" at the expense of a fair depiction of his character and motivation. Some members of communist organizations in the Philippines also criticized the film's various historical inaccuracies.

== Cast ==
- Phillip Salvador as Fr. Balweg / Ka Ambo
- Rio Locsin as Azon
- Tetchie Agbayani as Ka Susan
- Johnny Delgado as Ka George
- Pinky Amador as Terry Guerrero
- Jose Romulo as Macli-ing Dulag
- Mon Godiz
- Bebong Osorio as Ka Jvy
- Eddie Infante as Lakay
- Baldo Marro as Abraham
- Ray Ventura as Ka Efren
- Lucita Soriano as Ka Minda
- Gwen Colmenares as Ka Rita
- Alex Toledo as Ka Badong
- Apol Salonga as Fr. de Vega
- Ding Salvador as Fr. Torry
- Rene Hawkins as military officer
- Nemie Gutierrez as Lt. Cruz
- Gregg de Guzman
- Ernie Forte as Waldo
- Ernie David
- Eric Francisco

== Production ==
Balweg is director Antonio "Butch" Perez's first film in six years, after his solo debut feature film Haplos. It is also actress Tetchie Agbayani's first film since she came back to the Philippines from Hollywood.

Perez asserted that they did not fictionalize any element in Conrado Balweg's story for the film, stating that "The people concerned are still alive[,] we had to be very careful. It was only a matter of putting things to dramatic structure." According to the cast, filming in the Cordilleras was a difficult experience, with actor Phillip Salvador suggesting that "Butch was doing the most difficult movie of the year."

=== Music ===
Richard Reynoso sang the theme song to Balweg.

== Release ==
Balweg was released on July 8, 1987, with free tie-in T-shirts and stickers handed out to "lucky" moviegoers. The film was a box office success.

=== Television broadcast ===
The film received a terrestrial television premiere on June 23, 1990, as a feature presentation for Tagalog Movie Greats, ABS-CBN's Saturday night movie presentation program.

== Historical accuracy ==
In the magazine Philippine News and Features (PNF), five members of the Communist Party of the Philippines and the New People's Army (CPP-NPA) who allegedly knew Balweg while he was an NPA member released a collective critique of the film, stating that the film unfairly treats Balweg as a central figure in the struggle of people in the Cordilleras. They also highlighted the numerous inaccuracies they found within the film, such as the claim that the Cordillera people did not accept the CPP-NPA; according to them, "hundreds and hundreds" of Cordillerans were already recruited to the CPP-NPA. They also claimed that instead of the film's depiction of Balweg's group confronting the military in the early 1980s and being decimated, in actuality Balweg's unit was not actively battling anyone during that period of time.

== Reception ==
=== Critical response ===
Balweg received generally negative reviews from critics.

Mike Feria, writing for the Manila Standard, criticizing the film as "[a] confused and opportunistic film about a confused and opportunistic personality." He faulted its lack of "dramatic intensity", with there being no satisfactory explanation for Balweg's motivations as a rebel, and considered it as another example of a film that does not seek to illuminate the "rationalization" of rebellion by the depicted person, but instead highlights the exploits of a rebel through a larger-than-life depiction for a mass audience. However, Feria noted that there were competent performances given by Johnny Delgado and Eddie Infante, while the action scenes were adequately staged. Later in his year-end assessment of Philippine cinema, Feria observed that Balweg was one of the few films given serious effort by filmmakers that "were at best, adequate in technical aspects but largely manipulative...." JC Nigado, also writing for the Manila Standard, shared Feria's negative sentiments on the film, finding it to be a "self-serving" film in its glorified depiction of Balweg. He wrote that "In trying to portray Balweg as a larger-than-life hero, [...] the movie only succeeds in doing the opposite as it unwittingly depicts the man as an opportunist wanting in direction."

=== Accolades ===
Group	Category	Name	Result
FAMAS Awards	Best Actor	Phillip Salvador	Won
Film Academy of the Philippines Awards	Best Actor	Phillip Salvador	Won
Film Academy of the Philippines Awards	Best Original Screenplay	Amado Lacuesta Jr.	Won
Film Academy of the Philippines Awards	Best Sound Engineering	Rolly Ruta	Won
