= Boy Negro =

1988 action film by Pepe Marcos

- Directed by: Pepe Marcos
- Screenplay by: Jose N. Carreon
- Story by: Max Buan
- Produced by: Ramon Salvador
- Starring: Phillip Salvador
- Cinematography: Rey de Leon
- Edited by: Ike Jarlego Jr.
- Music by: Jun Latonio
- Production company: Viva Films
- Distributed by: Viva Films
- Release date: June 2, 1988
- Running time: 120 minutes
- Country: Philippines
- Language: Filipino

Boy Negro is a 1988 Philippine biographical action film directed by Pepe Marcos. The film stars Phillip Salvador in the title role. The film is based on the life of Arsenio Cayanan as told by the late crime columnist Max Buan.

A sequel Anak ni Boy Negro was released in 1997.

The film is streaming online on YouTube.

== Cast ==
- Phillip Salvador as Boy Negro
  - Joko Diaz as Young Boy Negro
- Dang Cecilio as Janice
- Leopoldo Salcedo as Carlos Cayanan
- Paquito Diaz as Capt. Quiazon
- Raul Aragon as Sgt. Ventura
- Anita Linda as Aling Gloria
- Manjo del Mundo as Nardo
- Diane Jose as Rowena
- Tommy Abuel as Max Buan
- Ruel Vernal as Pfc. Bermudez
- Ernie Forte as Pfc. Ramos
- Ding Salvador as Pfc. Sanchez
- Marita Zobel as Mrs. Ramirez
- Ramil Rodriguez as Mr. Ramirez
- Hero Bautista as Arnel
- Baldo Marro as Gustin
- Mary Walter as Grandmother
- Johnny Vicar as Toribio
- Renato del Prado as Tiyo Maning
- Amelia Crisologo as Tiya Senyang
- Ester Chavez as Celing
- Maylene Gonzales as Joy
- Vic Varrion as Dollente
- Usman Hassim as Kadyo
- Ernie Zarate as Chief of Police

== Awards ==
Year	Awards	Category	Recipient	Result	Ref.
1989	7th FAP Awards	Best Picture	Boy Negro	Won	
1989	7th FAP Awards	Best Actor	Phillip Salvador	Won	
1989	7th FAP Awards	Best Child Performer	Joko Diaz	Won	
1989	37th FAMAS Awards	Best Picture	Boy Negro	Nominated	
1989	37th FAMAS Awards	Best Actor	Phillip Salvador	Nominated	
1989	37th FAMAS Awards	Best Child Actor	Joko Diaz	Nominated	
1989	12th Gawad Urian Awards	Best Actor	Phillip Salvador	Nominated	
1989	12th Gawad Urian Awards	Best Supporting Actor	Baldo Marro	Nominated	
1989	12th Gawad Urian Awards	Best Supporting Actress	Mary Walter	Nominated	
1989	12th Gawad Urian Awards	Best Editing	Ike Jarlego Jr.	Nominated	
