= Phillip Salvador =

Filipino film and television actor

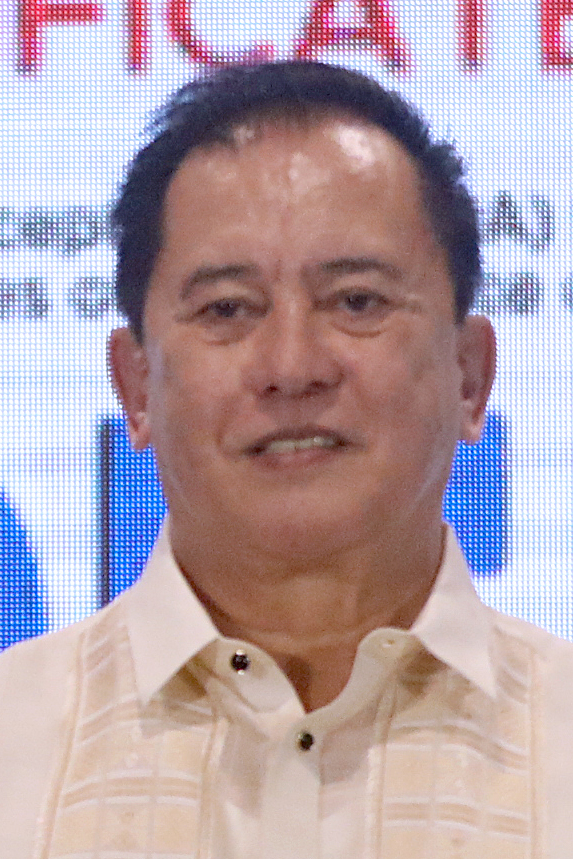
- Salvador in 2024
- Born: Felipe Reyes Salvador; August 21, 1953 (age 73); Santa Cruz, Manila, Philippines
- Occupations: Film and television actor
- Years active: 1965–present
- Political party: PDP (2024–present)
- Other political affiliations: NPC (2016); PMP (2001)
- Spouses: Asuncion D. Salvador (m. 1975; div. 2003) Emma Estocada (m. 2003)
- Partner: Kris Aquino (1992–1995)
- Family: Barbara Salvador (oldest daughter); Luis Salvador (oldest son); Michelle Salvador (daughter); Ross Rival (brother); Lou Salvador Jr. (brother); Alona Alegre (sister); Jon Hernandez (nephew); Maja Salvador (niece); Janella Salvador (great-niece); Ethan Salvador (grandson)
- Awards: FAMAS Best Actor; 1986 Bayan Ko: Kapit sa Patalim; 1994 Masahol Pa sa Hayop; 1997 Bobby Barbers, Parak; Gawad Urian Best Actor; 1983 Cain at Abel; 1984 Karnal; 1986 Bayan Ko: Kapit sa Patalim; FAP Luna Awards Best Actor; 1983 Cain at Abel; 1986 Bayan Ko: Kapit Sa Patalim; 1988 Balweg; 1989 Boy Negro; 1994 Masahol Pa sa Hayop; 1995 Ka Hector; 1997 Hangga't May Hininga; PMPC Star Awards Best Actor; 1986 Bayan Ko: Kapit sa Patalim; 1994 Masahol Pa sa Hayop; 1995 Ka Hector

Phillip Mikael "Ipe" Reyes Salvador (born Felipe Reyes Salvador; August 21, 1953) is a Filipino film and television actor.

== Acting career ==
Salvador made his film debut in 1971 with Adios Mi Amor. He toiled in minor roles in Philippine movies until he became a protégé of director Lino Brocka. Together, they made more than ten films in a row, including Ang Tatay Kong Nanay (1978), Mananayaw (1978), Gumising Ka, Maruja (1978), Hayop sa Hayop (1978), Init (1979), Jaguar (1979), Bona (1980), Kontrobersyal (1981), Cain and Abel (1982) and PX (1982). Jaguar, where Salvador played the lead, became the first Filipino film to be entered into competition at the Cannes Film Festival. Salvador played the leading role in another Brocka film, Bayan Ko: Kapit sa Patalim (1985), for which he won his first of three FAMAS Best Actor awards. In 1989, Salvador again starred in another Brocka film, Orapronobis, which was critical of the human rights record of the administration of President Corazon Aquino. That film was banned by the local film censors, the Movie and Television Review and Classification Board.

Throughout the 1980s and 1990s, Salvador headlined several biopics, including Balweg (1986), Boy Negro (1988), Kumander Dante (1988), Joe Pring: Homicide Manila Police (1989) and its sequel Kidlat ng Maynila: Joe Pring 2 (1991), Mancao (1994) and Ka Hector (1995). For his portrayal of Senator Robert Barbers in Bobby Barbers, Parak (1997), Salvador won his third FAMAS Best Actor Award; he had previously won his second such award for Padilla: Bala Lang ang Katapat Mo! in 1993.

Salvador transitioned into supporting roles in films such as Utang ng Ama (2003) and Baler (2008). He also co-starred in the ABS-CBN television series Maging Sino Ka Man and Ang Panday (2005).

== Politics ==
=== 2001 Vice Mayoral run ===
Salvador ran for vice mayor of Mandaluyong in 2001, but lost.

=== 2016 Vice Gubernatorial run ===
He then ran for Vice Governor of Bulacan as the running mate of Josefina Dela Cruz in the 2016 local election. He and Dela Cruz respectively lost to incumbent candidates Daniel Fernando and Wilhelmino Sy-Alvarado.

=== 2025 Senatorial run ===
Salvador ran for Senator in the 2025 Senatorial elections under Partido Demokratiko Pilipino or PDP, and he eventually became a part of the DuterTen senatorial slate. He lost the senatorial bid and ended up in 19th place, gaining 10,241,491 votes or 17.86% of the votes.

== Personal life ==
Salvador is the son of the athlete and film/stage producer Lou Salvador and Corazon Reyes. He is the brother to Alona Alegre, Mina Aragon, Leroy Salvador, Lou Salvador, Jr., Ross Rival (born Rosauro Salvador), Robert Barcelona and the uncle of actresses Deborah Sun (born Jean Louise Salvador), Jobelle Salvador, Althea Salvador (who is now married to former action star Jess Lapid, Jr., and Maja Salvador. Singer Juan Miguel "JM" Salvador is his nephew and actress Janella Salvador is his great-niece. He is now married to Emma Ledesma. He has a son named Joshua (born 1995) with actress Kris Aquino as a result of his extra-marital affair.

On January 21, 2009, he beat a bus driver named Michael Baino when he nearly hit his car in Mandaluyong.

=== Fraud conviction ===
In 2006, Salvador was convicted by a Las Piñas trial court for estafa and sentenced to 20 years in prison. The case had been initiated by a businesswoman, Cristina Decena, with whom he had a relationship. As of January 2009, the case is pending appeal with the Court of Appeals.

== Filmography ==
=== Film ===
Year	Title	Role	Note(s)	Ref(s).
1971	Adios Mi Amor			
1975	Anino ng Araw			
1975	Anak ng Araw			
1976	Sapagka't Kami'y Mga Misis Lamang			
1976	Bato sa Buhangin	Phil		
1977	Maligno			
1978	Mananayaw			
1978	Ang Tatay Kong Nanay	Dennis		
1978	Gumising Ka, Maruja	Marco Lorenzo/Rodrigo de Velasquez		
1978	Hayop sa Hayop			
1978	Rubia Servios	Willy		
1979	Maynila 1970			
1979	Init	Emil Santos		
1979	Jaguar	Poldo		
1979	Riza Jones			
1980	Pader at Rehas			
1980	Ihawig			
1980	Nakaw Na Pag-ibig			
1980	Bona	Gardo		
1981	Playgirl			
1981	Ako ang Hari			
1981	Deadly Brothers			
1981	Kamandag Na Rehas Na Bakal			
1981	Kontrobersyal	Alain		
1982	Caught in the Act	Leo Capili		
1982	Mga Pambato	Torong Tisoy		
1982	Sinasamba Kita	Oscar		
1982	PX			
1982	In This Corner	Kid Alaminos		
1982	Five and the Skin	Carding	Original title: Cinq et la peau	
1982	Cain and Abel	Loren		
1983	Hubad sa Gubat			
1983	Of the Flesh	Narcing	Original title: Karnal	
1983	Hot Property			
1983	Sarge			
1984	Adultery (Aida Macaraeg Case No. 7892)	Carding		
1984	Alyas Baby Tsina	Roy		
1984	Teteng Shotgun			
1984	Alyas Ben Baliwag			
1985	Alyas Boy Cebuano			
1985	Boncayao Brigada: Sa Kuko ng Mga Kaaway			
1985	Tinik sa Dibdib	Lando		
1985	This Is My Country	Turing	Original title: Bayan Ko: Kapit sa Patalim	
1985	Dadaan sa Isang Api			
1986	Big Ambulance			
1986	Sumuko Na Ako sa Batas			
1986	Gabi Na, Kumander	Kumander Cobra		
1986	Adiong Valderama	Adiong Valderama		
1987	Balweg	Fr. Conrado Balweg		
1987	Tatak ng Cebu	Danilo Dela Cruz		
1987	Black Brown Brother			
1988	Afuang: Bounty Hunter	Pfc. Abner Afuang		
1988	Boy Negro	Arsenio Cayanan		
1988	Kumander Dante	Bernabe Buscayno		
1988	I Love You 3x a Day	Afuang	Cameo	
1989	Ipaghihiganti Ko Sa'yo			
1989	Fight for Us	Jimmy Cordero	Original title: Orapronobis	
1989	Delima Gang	Turoy Delima		
1989	Joe Pring: Homicide, Manila Police	Joe Pring		
1990	Ikasa Mo, Ipuputok Ko	Capt. Guiller Sta. Romana		
1990	Angel Molave	Angel Molave		
1990	Kidlat ng Maynila: Joe Pring 2	Joe Pring		
1991	Uubusin Ko Ang Lahi Mo	Lt. Peping Guerrero		
1991	Okay Ka, Fairy Ko!	Joe Pring		
1992	Tatak ng Cebu II: Emong Verdadero (Bala ng Ganti)	Danilo Dela Cruz		
1992	Pat. Omar Abdullah: Pulis Probinsiya	Pat. Omar Abdullah		
1992	Mukhang Bungo: Da Coconut Nut	Actor	Cameo	
1992	Lucio Margallo	Lucio Margallo		
1993	Masahol Pa sa Hayop: Padilla (Bala Lang ang Katapat Mo!)	Capt. Tomas Padilla		
1994	Mancao	Capt. Cezar Mancao		
1994	Nandito Ako	Victor Villegas		
1994	Tunay Na Magkaibigan, Walang Iwanan...Peksman!	Daniel Santos		
1994	Ka Hector	Leopoldo Mabilangan		
1995	Pulis Probinsiya 2: Tapusin Na Natin ang Laban	Pat. Omar Abdullah		
1995	Pamilya Valderama	Bobby Valderama		
1996	Maginoong Barumbado	Angel Solomon		
1996	Hangga't May Hininga	Capt. Eliseo "Ellis" Soriano		
1997	Bobby Barbers: Parak; The Bobby Barbers Story	Bobby Barbers		
1997	Onyok Velasco Story	Phillip		
1998	Kahit Pader Gigibain Ko	Capt. Roman Sta Maria		
1998	Berdugo	Enrico Gonzales		
1998	Alyas Boy Tigas: Ang Probinsyanong Wais	Phillip		
1999	Resbak, Babalikan Kita	Warlo Guerrero		
2000	Huwag Mo Akong Subukan			
2000	Pag Oras Mo, Oras Mo Na	Capt. Victor de Leon		
2001	Kaaway Hanggang Hukay	Col. Baltazar Soriano		
2003	Utang ng Ama	Ipe		
2008	For the First Time	Santi Sandoval		
2008	Baler	Daniel Reyes		
2009	Ang Panday	Lizardo		
2010	Rosario	Don Enrique Pereira		
2011	Manila Kingpin: The Asiong Salonga Story	Sgt. Doming Salonga		
2011	Ang Panday 2	Lizardo		
2012	Hitman	Tomas		
2012	Mater Dolorosa			
2013	Alamat ni China Doll			
2013	10,000 Hours			
2014	Bawat Sandali			
2015	Felix Manalo	Rev. Emmanuel Tanco		
2015	The Last Pinoy Action King	Himself		
2017	Pastor	Pastor Luis Aguila		
2017	Dark Is the Night	Lando	Original title: Madilim ang Gabi	
2020	Isa Pang Bahaghari	Domingo "Domeng" delos Santos		

=== Television ===
- Star Drama Presents (1993–2001)
- Codename: Verano (1999)
- Liwanag ng Hatinggabi (1999–2000)
- Ang Panday (2005)
- Maging Sino Ka Man (2006–2007)
- Maging Sino Ka Man: Ang Pagbabalik (2007–2008)
- 5 Star Specials (2010)
- Untold Stories Mula Sa Face To Face (2010)
- Wansapanataym Presents: Rod Santiago's: Buhawi Jack (2011) .... Jaime Isidro
- Mga Nagbabagang Bulaklak (2011) .... Zeus Montemayor
- Star Confession (2011) .... Ramon "Mon" Tulfo
- Kung Ako'y Iiwan Mo (2012) ....Roman Trinidad
- Makapiling Kang Muli (2012) ....Amadeo Perez
- Protégé: The Battle For The Big Artista Break (2012) ....Himself/Mentor
- Unforgettable (2013) ....Manuel de Ocampo
- Undercover (2013) ....Don Faustino
- Home Sweetie Home (2014)
- Maalaala Mo Kaya
- Karelasyon
- Black Rider (2023) ....Mariano
- FPJ's Batang Quiapo (Kapamilya Channel, 2025) Gen. Rowell Montenegro

== Awards ==
Year	Award-Giving Body	Category	Work	Result	Ref
1983	7th Gawad Urian	Best Actor	Cain At Abel	Won	
1983	1st FAP Awards	Best Actor	Cain At Abel	Won	
1984	8th Gawad Urian	Best Actor	Karnal	Won	
1986	35th FAMAS Awards	Best Actor	Bayan Ko: Kapit Sa Patalim	Won	
1986	10th Gawad Urian	Best Actor	Bayan Ko: Kapit Sa Patalim	Won	
1986	4th FAP Awards	Best Actor	Bayan Ko: Kapit Sa Patalim	Won	
1986	2nd Star Awards for Movies	Movie Actor of the Year	Bayan Ko: Kapit Sa Patalim	Won	
1988	6th FAP Awards	Best Actor	Balweg, The Rebel Priest	Won	
1989	7th FAP Awards	Best Actor	Boy Negro	Won	
1989	19th Guillermo Mendoza Memorial Scholarship Foundation Awards	Box Office King	Afuang / Boy Negro	Won	
1991	15th Gawad Urian	Natatanging Aktor Ng Dekada (1980-1989)		Won	
1994	42nd FAMAS Awards	Best Actor	Masahol Pa Sa Hayop	Won	
1994	12th FAP Awards	Best Actor	Masahol Pa Sa Hayop	Won	
1994	10th Star Awards for Movies	Movie Actor of the Year	Masahol Pa Sa Hayop	Won	
1995	13th FAP Awards	Best Actor	Ka Hector	Won	
1995	11th Star Awards for Movies	Movie Actor of the Year	Ka Hector	Won	
1997	15th FAP Awards	Best Actor	Hangga't May Hininga	Won	
1998	46th FAMAS Awards	Best Actor	Bobby Barbers: Parak	Won	
2008	34th Metro Manila Film Festival	Best Supporting Actor	Baler	Won	
2009	27th FAP Luna Awards	Best Supporting Actor	Baler	Won	
2009	35th Metro Manila Film Festival	Best Supporting Actor	Ang Panday	Won	
