= Luna Award for Best Supporting Actor =

Annual Philippine film award

- Awarded for: Best Performance by an Actor in a Supporting Role
- Country: Philippines
- Presented by: Film Academy of the Philippines (FAP)
- First award: 1983
- Currently held by: LA Santos; In His Mother's Eyes (2024)

Highlights
- Most wins: Ronaldo Valdez (3)
- Most nominations: Nonie Buencamino & Ronaldo Valdez (5)

The Luna Award for Best Supporting Actor is an award presented annually by the Film Academy of the Philippines (FAP). It has been awarded since the 1st Luna Awards to actors who have delivered outstanding performance in a supporting role.

In 1981, the Executive Order 640-A signed by President Ferdinand Marcos mandated the Film Academy of the Philippines to recognize excellence in Philippine filmmaking annually. However, due to recurring financial difficulties, the Luna Awards were not held in certain years or were sometimes postponed to a later date.

LA Santos currently holds this title for his role in In His Mother's Eyes. Meanwhile, Ronaldo Valdez has the record for most wins in this category with three awards.

== Winners and nominees ==
The winner is shown first, followed by the other nominees.

=== 1980s ===
| Year | Actor | Film | Role |
|---|---|---|---|
1983 (1st)
| 1983 (1st) | Rodolfo "Boy" Garcia | Ito Ba ang Ating Mga Anak | |
1984 (2nd)
| 1984 (2nd) | Marco Polo Garcia | Pieta | Young Rigor |
1985 (3rd)
| 1985 (3rd) | George Estregan | Sa Bulaklak ng Apoy | |
1986 (4th)
| 1986 (4th) | Michael de Mesa | Paradise Inn | Rey |
1987 (5th)
| 1987 (5th) | Tony Santos | Mabuhay Ka sa Baril | Dario's father |
1988 (6th)
| 1988 (6th) | Jay Ilagan | Maging Akin Ka Lamang | Ernie Balboa |
1989 (7th)
| 1989 (7th) | Eddie Infante | Ang Supremo | |

=== 1990s ===
| Year | Actor | Film | Role |
|---|---|---|---|
1990 (8th)
| 1990 (8th) | Tito Arevalo | Wakwak (Isang Araw Walang Diyos) | Tatang Mundo |
1991 (9th)
| 1991 (9th) | Dencio Padilla | Kahit Konting Pagtingin | Basilio |
1992 (10th)
| 1992 (10th) | Eddie Gutierrez | Uubusin Ko ang Lahi Mo | Mayor Placido Canonigo |
1993 (11th)
| 1993 (11th) | Tirso Cruz III | Kahit Buhay Ko... | Melgar |
1994 (12th)
| 1994 (12th) | Ronaldo Valdez | May Minamahal | Cenon |
1995 (13th)
| 1995 (13th) | Robert Arevalo | Pangako ng Kahapon | Bestre San Juan |
1996 (14th)
| 1996 (14th) | Ricky Davao | Ipaglaban Mo: The Movie | Allan |
| 1996 (14th) | Nonie Buencamino | Sibak: Midnight Dancers | Dave |
| 1996 (14th) | Tirso Cruz III | Inagaw Mo ang Lahat sa Akin | Peping |
1997 (15th)
| 1997 (15th) | Albert Martinez | Segurista | Jake |
| 1997 (15th) | Patrick Garcia | Madrasta | Ryan Chavez |
1998 (16th)
| 1998 (16th) | Ronaldo Valdez | Nasaan ang Puso | Edgardo |
1999 (17th)
| 1999 (17th) | Carlo Aquino | Bata Bata, Paano Ka Ginawa? | Ojie |
| 1999 (17th) | Albert Martinez | Bata Bata, Paano Ka Ginawa? | Ding |

=== 2000s ===
| Year | Actor | Film | Role |
|---|---|---|---|
2000 (18th)
| 2000 (18th) | Raymond Bagatsing | Soltera | Dr. Jojo Morales |
| 2000 (18th) | Pen Medina | Muro-Ami | Diosdado "Diyos-Dado" Lacar |
2001 (19th)
| 2001 (19th) | Pen Medina | Deathrow | Gabino |
| 2001 (19th) | Bojo Molina | Gusto Ko ng Lumigaya | |
| 2001 (19th) | Jericho Rosales | Tanging Yaman | Rommel |
| 2001 (19th) | Patrick Garcia | Sugatang Puso | Eric |
| 2001 (19th) | Roi Vinzon | Palaban | Ex-Major Cordova |
2002 (20th)
| 2002 (20th) | Dante Rivero | Tuhog | Leon |
| 2002 (20th) | Carlo Aquino | Bagong Buwan | Rashid |
| 2002 (20th) | Jericho Rosales | Bagong Buwan | Lt. Ricarte |
| 2002 (20th) | Nonie Buencamino | Bagong Buwan | Musa |
| 2002 (20th) | Ronnie Lazaro | Bagong Buwan | Datu Ali |
2003 (21st)
| 2003 (21st) | Piolo Pascual | Dekada '70 | Jules |
| 2003 (21st) | Dante Rivero | Lapu-Lapu | Ferdinand Magellan |
| 2003 (21st) | Joonee Gamboa | Diskarte | Ka Esteban |
| 2003 (21st) | Roi Vinzon | Batas ng Lansangan | Carlos |
| 2003 (21st) | Roy Alvarez | Diskarte | Veloso |
| 2003 (21st) | Tirso Cruz III | Diskarte | Colonel Montero |
2004 (22nd)
| 2004 (22nd) | Eric Quizon | Crying Ladies | Wilson Chua |
| 2004 (22nd) | Jay Manalo | Mano Po 2: My Home | Johnson |
| 2004 (22nd) | Mark Gil | Magnifico | Domeng |
| 2004 (22nd) | Paolo Contis | Noon at Ngayon: Pagsasamang Kay Ganda | Bryan |
2005 (23rd)
| 2005 (23rd) | Jay Manalo | Aishite Imasu 1941: Mahal Kita | Ichiru |
| 2005 (23rd) | Eddie Garcia | Mano Po III: My Love | Melencio |
| 2005 (23rd) | Johnny Delgado | Santa Santita | Fr. Tony |
| 2005 (23rd) | Ronnie Lazaro | Panaghoy sa Suba | Kuwanggol |
| 2005 (23rd) | Ryan Eigenmann | Milan | Perry |
2006 (24th)
| 2006 (24th) | Johnny Delgado | La Visa Loca | Papang |
| 2006 (24th) | BJ Forbes | Ispiritista: Itay, May Moomoo | TomTom |
| 2006 (24th) | Michael de Mesa | Dubai | Basi |
| 2006 (24th) | Ping Medina | Ang Pagdadalaga ni Maximo Oliveros | Bogs Oliveros |
| 2006 (24th) | Ryan Agoncillo | Kutob | Carlo |
2007 (25th)
| 2007 (25th) | Johnny Delgado | Ligalig | Damian |
| 2007 (25th) | Archi Adamos | Raket ni Nanay | Itoy |
| 2007 (25th) | Eddie Garcia | Till I Met You | Señor Manuel |
| 2007 (25th) | Ronaldo Valdez | Sukob | Fred |
| 2007 (25th) | Tommy Abuel | Don't Give Up on Us | Robert |
2008 (26th)
| 2008 (26th) | Dante Rivero | A Love Story | Sergio Montes |
| 2008 (26th) | Alchris Galura | Batad | Ag-ap |
| 2008 (26th) | Pen Medina | Banal | Manalo |
| 2008 (26th) | Ronnie Lazaro | Ataul: For Rent | Tata Islaw |
| 2008 (26th) | Wendell Ramos | Happy Hearts | Louie |
2009 (27th)*
| 2009 (27th)* | Phillip Salvador | Baler | Daniel Reyes |
| 2009 (27th)* | Christopher de Leon | When Love Begins | Paco Valmonte |
| 2009 (27th)* | Dante Rivero | A Very Special Love | Luis Montenegro |
| 2009 (27th)* | Makisig Morales | Caregiver | Sean |
| 2009 (27th)* | Phillip Salvador | For the First Time | Santi Sandoval |
| 2009 (27th)* | Ricky Davao | Endo | |
| 2009 (27th)* | Ronaldo Valdez | When Love Begins | Leo Caballero |

=== 2010s ===
| Year | Actor | Film | Role |
|---|---|---|---|
2010 (28th)
| 2010 (28th) | No awards given for this year. | | |
2011 (29th)*
| 2011 (29th)* | Yul Servo | Rosario | Vicente |
| 2011 (29th)* | Dennis Trillo | Rosario | Alberto |
| 2011 (29th)* | Dolphy | Rosario | Hesus |
| 2011 (29th)* | Joem Bascon | Noy | Bong |
| 2011 (29th)* | Sid Lucero | Rosario | Carding |
2012 (30th)
| 2012 (30th) | John Regala | Manila Kingpin: The Asiong Salonga Story | Totoy Golem |
| 2012 (30th) | Jericho Rosales | Yesterday, Today, Tomorrow | Jacob |
| 2012 (30th) | John Regala | Zombadings 1: Patayin sa Shokot si Remington | Ed |
| 2012 (30th) | Phillip Salvador | Ang Panday 2 | Lizardo |
| 2012 (30th) | Roderick Paulate | Zombadings 1: Patayin sa Shokot si Remington | Pops |
2013 (31st)
| 2013 (31st) | Ronaldo Valdez | The Mistress | Torres Sr. |
| 2013 (31st) | Albert Martinez | Born to Love You | Charles |
| 2013 (31st) | Rez Cortez | Bwakaw | Sol |
| 2013 (31st) | Zanjoe Marudo | One More Try | Tristan |
2014 (32nd)
| 2014 (32nd) | No awards given for this year. | | |
2015 (33rd)
| 2015 (33rd) | No awards given for this year. | | |
2016 (34th)
| 2016 (34th) | Nonie Buencamino | Heneral Luna | Felipe Buencamino |
| 2016 (34th) | Allen Dizon | Imbisibol | Manuel |
| 2016 (34th) | Bernardo Bernardo | Imbisibol | Benjie |
| 2016 (34th) | Dennis Padilla | The Breakup Playlist | Joey David |
| 2016 (34th) | JM de Guzman | Imbisibol | Rodel |
| 2016 (34th) | RK Bagatsing | Apocalypse Child | Rich |
| 2016 (34th) | Tirso Cruz III | Honor Thy Father | Bishop Tony |
2017 (35th)
| 2017 (35th) | Christian Bables | Die Beautiful | Barbs |
| 2017 (35th) | Jerald Napoles | Pauwi Na | JP |
| 2017 (35th) | Ricky Davao | Dukot | Charlie |
| 2017 (35th) | Ronnie Alonte | Seklusyon | Miguel |
2018 (36th)
| 2018 (36th) | John Arcilla | Birdshot | Mendoza |
| 2018 (36th) | Alex Medina | Historiographika Errata | Mateo |
| 2018 (36th) | Ku Aquino | Birdshot | Diego |
| 2018 (36th) | Nonie Buencamino | Ang Larawan | Manolo |
| 2018 (36th) | Rocky Salumbides | Neomanila | Raul |
| 2018 (36th) | Romulo Caballero | The Chanters | Lolo Ramon |
| 2018 (36th) | Ronwaldo Martin | Bhoy Intsik | |
| 2018 (36th) | Sid Lucero | Smaller and Smaller Circles | Father Jerome Lucero |
2019 (37th)
| 2019 (37th) | Arjo Atayde | BuyBust | Biggie Chen |
| 2019 (37th) | Carlo Aquino | Goyo: Ang Batang Heneral | Colonel Vicente Enriquez |
| 2019 (37th) | Epy Quizon | Goyo: Ang Batang Heneral | Apolinario Mabini |
| 2019 (37th) | Mon Confiado | Signal Rock | Damian |
| 2019 (37th) | Soliman Cruz | Liway | Sulpicio |

=== 2020s ===
| Year | Actor | Film | Role |
|---|---|---|---|
2020 (38th)
| 2020 (38th) | Soliman Cruz | Iska | Joven |
| 2020 (38th) | Dido de la Paz | Edward | Mario |
| 2020 (38th) | Elijah Canlas | Edward | Renz |
| 2020 (38th) | Ketchup Eusebio | Mindanao | Vergara |
| 2020 (38th) | Topper Fabregas | Sila-Sila | Jared |
2021
| 2021 | No awards given for this year. | | |
2022
| 2022 | No awards given for this year. | | |
2023 (39th)
| 2023 (39th) | John Arcilla | Reroute | Gemo |
| 2023 (39th) | Keempee de Leon | Mahal Kita, Beksman | Jaime |
| 2023 (39th) | Mon Confiado | Nanahimik ang Gabi | Soliman |
| 2023 (39th) | Nonie Buencamino | Family Matters | Kiko |
| 2023 (39th) | Vince Tañada | Katips | Panyong |
2024 (40th)
| 2024 (40th) | LA Santos | In His Mother's Eyes | Tim |
| 2024 (40th) | Archi Adamos | Third World Romance | Sir Dodong |
| 2024 (40th) | Elijah Canlas | GomBurZa | Paciano Rizal Mercado |
| 2024 (40th) | Pepe Herrera | Rewind | Lods |
| 2024 (40th) | Piolo Pascual | GomBurZa | Padre Pedro Pelaez |

== Multiple wins ==
The following individuals have won two or more Luna Awards for Best Supporting Actor:

| Wins | Actor | Nominations | First Win | Latest Win |
|---|---|---|---|---|
| 3 | Ronaldo Valdez | 5 | May Minamahal (1994) | The Mistress (2013) |
| 2 | Dante Rivero | 4 | Tuhog (2002) | A Love Story (2009) |
| 2 | John Arcilla | 2 | Birdshot (2018) | Reroute (2023) |
| 2 | Johnny Delgado | 3 | La Visa Loca (2006) | Ligalig (2007) |

^{*The 27th and 29th Luna Awards were held on the same day due to financial difficulties.}
