= Luna Award for Best Supporting Actress =

Annual Philippine film award

- Awarded for: Best Performance by an Actress in a Supporting Role
- Country: Philippines
- Presented by: Film Academy of the Philippines (FAP)
- First award: 1983
- Currently held by: Ana Abad Santos; Third World Romance (2024)

Highlights
- Most wins: Gina Alajar & Nida Blanca (3)
- Most nominations: Amy Austria, Cherry Pie Picache, Daria Ramirez, Eugene Domingo, Gina Alajar, Gloria Romero, Hilda Koronel & Nida Blanca (4)

The Luna Award for Best Supporting Actress is an award presented annually by the Film Academy of the Philippines (FAP). Before 2005, it was called the FAP Awards. This has been awarded to actresses who have delivered outstanding performance in a supporting role.

In 1981, the Executive Order 640-A signed by President Ferdinand Marcos mandated the Film Academy of the Philippines to recognize excellence in Philippine filmmaking annually. However, due to recurring financial difficulties, the Luna Awards were not held in certain years or were sometimes postponed to a later date.

Ana Abad Santos currently holds this title for her role in Third World Romance. Gina Alajar and Nida Blanca both hold the record for the most wins in this category (3).

== Winners and nominees ==
The winner is shown first, followed by the other nominees.

=== 1980s ===
Year	Actor	Film	Role
1983 (1st)
1983 (1st)	Liza Lorena	Oro, Plata, Mata	Nena Ojeda
1984 (2nd)
1984 (2nd)	Charito Solis	Karnal	The storyteller
1985 (3rd)
1985 (3rd)	Gina Alajar	Kaya Kong Abutin ang Langit	Nancy Rosales
1986 (4th)
1986 (4th)	Dina Bonnevie	Tinik sa Dibdib	Corazon
1987 (5th)
1987 (5th)	Nida Blanca	Magdusa Ka!	Aling Toyang
1988 (6th)
1988 (6th)	Nida Blanca	Kid, Huwag Kang Susuko	Aling Turing
1988 (6th)	Gloria Romero	Saan Nagtatago ang Pag-ibig?	Carmen
1989 (7th)
1989 (7th)	Harlene Bautista	Gawa Na ang Balang Papatay sa Iyo	Lisa

=== 1990s ===
Year	Actor	Film	Role
1990 (8th)
1990 (8th)	Cherie Gil	Ang Bukas ay Akin, Langit ang Uusig	Miriam
1991 (9th)
1991 (9th)	Gina Alajar	Andrea, Paano Ba ang Maging Isang Ina?	Joyce
1992 (10th)
1992 (10th)	Dawn Zulueta	Una Kang Naging Akin	Vanessa
1993 (11th)
1993 (11th)	Amy Austria	Narito ang Puso Ko	Dolly Sanchez
1994 (12th)
1994 (12th)	Monique Wilson	Kapag Iginuhit ang Hatol ng Puso	Lally
1995 (13th)
1995 (13th)	Caridad Sanchez	Maalaala Mo Kaya: The Movie	Nena
1996 (14th)
1996 (14th)	Jaclyn Jose	The Flor Contemplacion Story	Neneng
1996 (14th)	Nida Blanca	Ipaglaban Mo: The Movie	Sandra
1997 (15th)
1997 (15th)	Gina Alajar	Mulanay: Sa Pusod ng Paraiso	Norma
1997 (15th)	Zsa Zsa Padilla	Madrasta	Karina Salvacion
1998 (16th)
1998 (16th)	Nida Blanca	Babae	
1999 (17th)
1999 (17th)	Serena Dalrymple	Bata, Bata, Paano Ka Ginawa?	Maya

=== 2000s ===
Year	Actor	Film	Role
2000 (18th)
2000 (18th)	Glydel Mercado	Sidhi	Mayang
2000 (18th)	Claudine Barretto	Soltera	Liza
2001 (19th)
2001 (19th)	Amy Austria	Anak	Lyn
2001 (19th)	Angelu de Leon	Bukas na Lang Kita Mamahalin	Abigail Mansueto / Abby
2001 (19th)	Cherie Gil	Sugatang Puso	Miriam
2001 (19th)	Cherry Pie Picache	Anak	Mercy
2001 (19th)	Daria Ramirez	Bayaning Third World	Doña Teodora
2002 (20th)
2002 (20th)	Caridad Sanchez	Bagong Buwan	Bae Farida
2002 (20th)	Alessandra de Rossi	Hubog	Nikka
2002 (20th)	Ana Capri	Minsan May Isang Puso	Melba
2002 (20th)	Elizabeth Oropesa	Balahibong Pusa	Vivian
2002 (20th)	Jaclyn Jose	Tuhog	Violeta
2003 (21st)
2003 (21st)	Cherry Pie Picache	American Adobo	Tere
2003 (21st)	Amy Austria	Mano Po	Linda Go
2003 (21st)	Boots Anson-Roa	Mano Po	Elisa Go
2003 (21st)	Gina Alajar	Mano Po	Gina Go
2003 (21st)	Maria Isabel Lopez	Lapu-Lapu	Mingming
2004 (22nd)
2004 (22nd)	Gloria Romero	Magnifico	Lola Magda
2004 (22nd)	Aiza Marquez	Noon at Ngayon: Pagsasamang Kay Gana	Bernadette
2004 (22nd)	Hilda Koronel	Crying Ladies	Rhoda "Aling Doray" Rivera
2004 (22nd)	Jennifer Sevilla	Kung Ako na Lang Sana	Jeanette
2005 (23rd)
2005 (23rd)	Jaclyn Jose	Naglalayag	Lorena Garcia
2005 (23rd)	Amy Austria	Beautiful Life	Benita
2005 (23rd)	Daria Ramirez	Panaghoy sa Suba	Miri
2005 (23rd)	Gloria Romero	Beautiful Life	Magda
2005 (23rd)	Hilda Koronel	Santa Santita	Chayong
2006 (24th)
2006 (24th)	Hilda Koronel	Nasaan Ka Man	Trining
2006 (24th)	Ana Capri	Kutob	Amy
2006 (24th)	Irma Adlawan	Nasaan Ka Man	Abling
2006 (24th)	Jean Garcia	Birhen ng Manaoag	Francine
2006 (24th)	Jennylyn Mercado	Blue Moon	Young Cora
2007 (25th)
2007 (25th)	Gina Pareño	Kasal, Kasali, Kasalo	Belita
2007 (25th)	Celia Rodriguez	Ligalig	Martha
2007 (25th)	Cherry Pie Picache	I Wanna Be Happy	Rory
2007 (25th)	Tala Santos	Inang Yaya	Ruby
2008 (26th)
2008 (26th)	Angelica Panganiban	A Love Story	Karyn Torres
2008 (26th)	Eugene Domingo	Bahay Kubo: A Pinoy Mano Po!	Marang
2008 (26th)	Eugene Domingo	Paano Kita Iibigin	Liwayway
2008 (26th)	Gina Pareño	Sakal, Sakali, Saklolo	Belita
2008 (26th)	Irma Adlawan	Ataul: For Rent	Aling Carmen
2009 (27th)*
2009 (27th)*	Iza Calzado	One True Love	Bela
2009 (27th)*	Candy Pangilinan	For the First Time	Manang Josie
2009 (27th)*	Eugene Domingo	Ikaw Pa Rin: Bongga Ka Boy	Shiela
2009 (27th)*	Maricel Laxa	Magkaibigan	Eden
2009 (27th)*	Tessie Tomas	100	Eloisa

=== 2010s ===
Year	Actor	Film	Role
2010 (28th)
2010 (28th)	No awards given for this year.		
2011 (29th)*
2011 (29th)*	Anne Curtis	In Your Eyes	Julia
2011 (29th)*	Cherry Pie Picache	Noy	Nanay Letty
2011 (29th)*	Eugene Domingo	Ang Tanging Ina Mo: Last na 'To!	Rowena
2011 (29th)*	Gloria Romero	Tarima	Lola Imang
2012 (30th)
2012 (30th)	Lovi Poe	Yesterday, Today, Tomorrow	Lori
2012 (30th)	Carla Abellana	My Neighbor's Wife	Jasmine
2012 (30th)	Liza Lorena	Presa	
2012 (30th)	Tetchie Agbayani	Thelma	Floring Molino
2013 (31st)
2013 (31st)	Hilda Koronel	The Mistress	Regina Torres
2013 (31st)	Andi Eigenmann	A Secret Affair	Sam
2013 (31st)	Anita Linda	Sta. Niña	Benigna
2013 (31st)	Daria Ramirez	A Mother's Story	Choleng
2013 (31st)	Eula Valdez	Born to Love You	Sylvia
2014 (32nd)
2014 (32nd)	No awards given for this year.		
2015 (33rd)
2015 (33rd)	No awards given for this year.		
2016 (34th)
2016 (34th)	Ana Abad Santos	Apocalypse Child	Chona
2016 (34th)	Alessandra de Rossi	Kid Kulafu	Dionisia Pacquiao
2016 (34th)	Annicka Dolonius	Apocalypse Child	Fiona
2016 (34th)	Ces Quesada	Imbisibol	Manang Linda
2016 (34th)	Lorna Tolentino	Crazy Beautiful You	Dra. Leah Serrano
2016 (34th)	Mylene Dizon	Heneral Luna	Isabel
2016 (34th)	Rio Locsin	The Breakup Playlist	Marissa David
2017 (35th)
2017 (35th)	Chai Fonacier	Patay na si Hesus	Jude
2017 (35th)	Andi Eigenmann	Ma' Rosa	Raquel Reyes
2017 (35th)	Barbie Forteza	Tuos	Dowokan
2017 (35th)	Gladys Reyes	Die Beautiful	Beth
2017 (35th)	Lotlot de Leon	Mrs.	Delia
2017 (35th)	Shaina Magdayao	Dukot	Cathy Sandoval
2018 (36th)
2018 (36th)	Jasmine Curtis-Smith	Siargao	Abi
2018 (36th)	Anna Luna	Changing Partners	Cris
2018 (36th)	Cristine Reyes	Seven Sundays	Cha Bonifacio
2018 (36th)	Kate Brios	Bomba	
2018 (36th)	Yayo Aguila	Kiko Boksingero	
2019 (37th)
2019 (37th)	Daria Ramirez	Signal Rock	Alicia Abakan
2019 (37th)	Aiko Melendez	Rainbow's Sunset	Georgina
2019 (37th)	Max Collins	Citizen Jake	Mandy
2019 (37th)	Nova Villa	Miss Granny	Fely
2019 (37th)	Sunshine Dizon	Rainbow's Sunset	Marife

=== 2020s ===
Year	Actor	Film	Role
2020 (38th)
2020 (38th)	Meryll Soriano	John Denver Trending	Marites Cabungcal
2020 (38th)	Angie Castrence	Iska	Bining
2020 (38th)	Dolly de Leon	Verdict	Elsa
2020 (38th)	Ella Cruz	Edward	Agnes
2020 (38th)	Yuna Tangog	Mindanao	Aisa
2021
2021	No awards given for this year.		
2022
2022	No awards given for this year.		
2023 (39th)
2023 (39th)	Mylene Dizon	Family Matters	Fortune
2023 (39th)	Agot Isidro	Family Matters	Odette
2023 (39th)	Beverly Salviejo	Maid in Malacañang	Biday
2023 (39th)	Elizabeth Oropesa	Maid in Malacañang	Lucy
2023 (39th)	Lara Morena	Relyebo	Mrs. S
2024 (40th)
2024 (40th)	Ana Abad Santos	Third World Romance	Mama Ging
2024 (40th)	Angel Aquino	A Very Good Girl	Conchita Novela
2024 (40th)	Cassy Legaspi	When I Met You in Tokyo	Hannah
2024 (40th)	Chienna Filomeno	A Very Good Girl	Zab Omila
2024 (40th)	Iyah Mina	Third World Romance	Inang Reyna

== Multiple wins ==
The following individuals have won two or more Luna Awards for Best Supporting Actress:

Wins	Actor	Nominations	First Win	Latest Win
3	Gina Alajar	4	Kaya Kong Abutin ang Langit (1985)	Mulanay: Sa Pusod ng Paraiso (1997)
3	Nida Blanca	4	Magdusa Ka! (1987)	Babae (1998)
2	Amy Austria	4	Narito ang Puso Ko (1993)	Anak (2001)
2	Ana Abad Santos	2	Apocalypse Child (2016)	Third World Romance (2024)
2	Caridad Sanchez	2	Maalaala Mo Kaya: The Movie (1995)	Bagong Buwan (2002)
2	Hilda Koronel	4	Nasaan Ka Man (2006)	The Mistress (2013)
2	Jaclyn Jose	3	The Flor Contemplacion Story (1996)	Naglalayag (2005)

^{*The 27th and 29th Luna Awards were held on the same day due to financial difficulties.}
