= Luna Award for Best Actress =

Annual Philippine film award

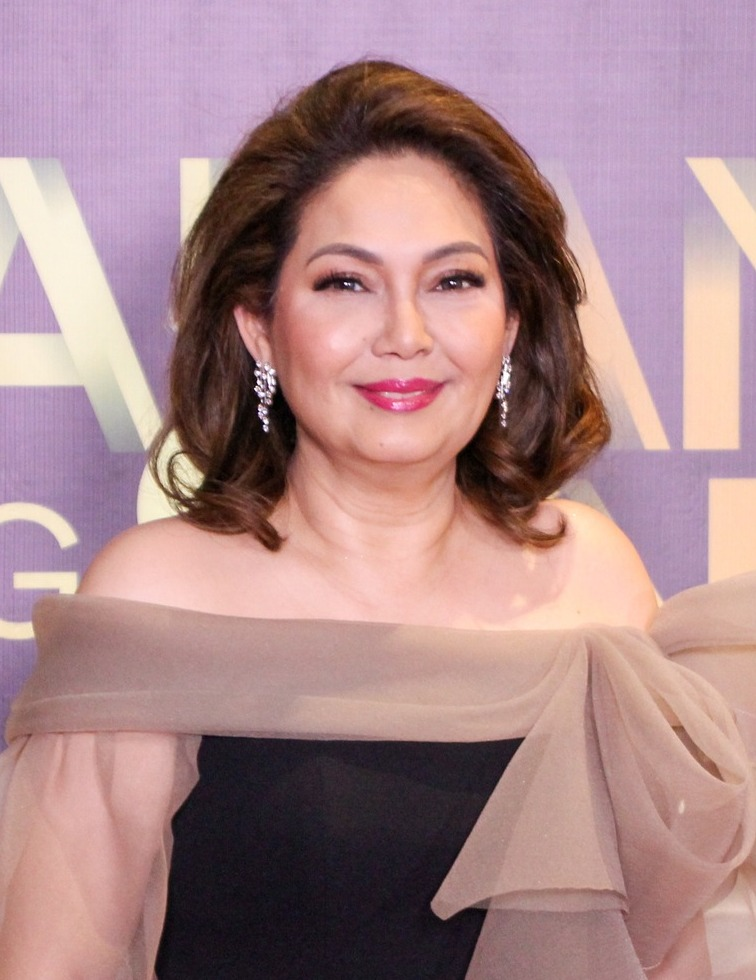
- The 2024 recipient: Maricel Soriano
- Awarded for: Best Performance by an Actress in a Leading Role
- Country: Philippines
- Presented by: Film Academy of the Philippines (FAP)
- First award: 1983
- Currently held by: Maricel Soriano; In His Mother's Eyes (2024)

Highlights
- Most wins: Lorna Tolentino, Maricel Soriano, Nora Aunor & Vilma Santos (4)
- Most nominations: Maricel Soriano (17)

The Luna Award for Best Actress is an award presented annually by the Film Academy of the Philippines (FAP). Before 2005, it was called the FAP Awards

. This has been awarded to actresses who have delivered outstanding performance in a lead role.

In 1981, the Executive Order 640-A signed by President Ferdinand Marcos mandated the Film Academy of the Philippines to recognize excellence in Philippine filmmaking annually. However, due to recurring financial difficulties, the Luna Awards were not held in certain years or were sometimes postponed to a later date.

Maricel Soriano currently holds this title for her role in In His Mother's Eyes. Meanwhile, four women hold the record for most wins (4) in this award: Lorna Tolentino, Maricel Soriano, Nora Aunor and Vilma Santos.

== Winners and nominees ==
The winner is shown first, followed by the other nominees.

=== 1980s ===
Year	Actor	Film	Role
1983 (1st)
1983 (1st)	Vilma Santos	Relasyon	Maria Lourdes "Marilou" Castañeda
1983 (1st)	Nora Aunor	Himala	Elsa
1984 (2nd)
1984 (2nd)	Vivian Velez	Pieta	Martha
1985 (3rd)
1985 (3rd)	Sharon Cuneta	Sa Hirap at Ginhawa	Cecilia Ventura
1985 (3rd)	Nora Aunor	Bulaklak sa City Jail	Angela
1985 (3rd)	Vilma Santos	Sister Stella L.	Sister Stella Legaspi
1986 (4th)
1986 (4th)	Nida Blanca	Miguelito	Auring
1986 (4th)	Nora Aunor	Tinik sa Dibdib	Lorna
1987 (5th)
1987 (5th)	Dina Bonnevie	Magdusa Ka!	Christine
1987 (5th)	Nora Aunor	I Love You Mama, I Love You Papa	Flora Villena
1988 (6th)
1988 (6th)	Lorna Tolentino	Maging Akin Ka Lamang	Rosita Monteverde
1988 (6th)	Vilma Santos	Tagos ng Dugo	Josefina "Pina" Ramos Regala
1989 (7th)
1989 (7th)	Amy Austria	Bubble's Ativan Gang	Celestina Sanchez aka Bubbles
1989 (7th)	Snooky Serna	Kapag Napagod ang Puso	
1989 (7th)	Vilma Santos	Ibulong Mo sa Diyos	Monica Quijano

=== 1990s ===
Year	Actor	Film	Role
1990 (8th)
1990 (8th)	Nora Aunor	Bilangin ang Bituin sa Langit	Doña Magnolia "Noli" Dela Cruz vda. de Zulueta and Maggie Zulueta
1990 (8th)	Vilma Santos	Pahiram ng Isang Umaga	Juliet
1991 (9th)
1991 (9th)	Nora Aunor	Andrea, Paano Ba ang Maging Isang Ina?	Andrea
1991 (9th)	Vilma Santos	Hahamakin Lahat	Lucinda
1992 (10th)
1992 (10th)	Nora Aunor	Ang Totoong Buhay ni Pacita M.	Pacita Macaspac
1992 (10th)	Vilma Santos	Ipagpatawad Mo	Celina Esquivel
1993 (11th)
1993 (11th)	Lorna Tolentino	Narito ang Puso Ko	Ellen Cortez Chavez
1994 (12th)
1994 (12th)	Vilma Santos	Dahil Mahal Kita: The Dolzura Cortez Story	Dolzura Cortez
1995 (13th)
1995 (13th)	Aiko Melendez	Maalaala Mo Kaya: The Movie	Ana
1996 (14th)
1996 (14th)	Nora Aunor	The Flor Contemplacion Story	Flor Contemplacion
1996 (14th)	Maricel Soriano	Dahas	Luisa
1996 (14th)	Snooky Serna	Inagaw Mo ang Lahat sa Akin	Clarita
1997 (15th)
1997 (15th)	Sharon Cuneta	Madrasta	Mariel Chavez
1997 (15th)	Nora Aunor	Bakit May Kahapon Pa?	Karina Salvacion
1998 (16th)
1998 (16th)	Maricel Soriano	Nasaan ang Puso	Joy
1998 (16th)	Zsa Zsa Padilla	Batang PX	Tessie
1998 (16th)	Nora Aunor	Babae	Bea
1999 (17th)
1999 (17th)	Vilma Santos	Bata, Bata, Paano Ka Ginawa?	Lea Bustamante
1999 (17th)	Nida Blanca	Sana Pag-ibig Na	Linda Perez

=== 2000s ===
Year	Actor	Film	Role
2000 (18th)
2000 (18th)	Elizabeth Oropesa	Bulaklak ng Maynila	Azun
2000 (18th)	Maricel Soriano	Soltera	Sandra Valdez
2000 (18th)	Nora Aunor	Sidhi	Ana
2001 (19th)
2001 (19th)	Gloria Romero	Tanging Yaman	Lola Loleng
2001 (19th)	Angelu de Leon	Bukas na Lang Kita Mamahalin	Abigail Mansueto / Abby
2001 (19th)	Lorna Tolentino	Sugatang Puso	Celine
2001 (19th)	Maricel Soriano	Abandonada	Gemma
2001 (19th)	Vilma Santos	Anak	Josie Agbisit
2002 (20th)
2002 (20th)	Lorna Tolentino	Abakada... Ina	Estella
2002 (20th)	Amy Austria	Bagong Buwan	Fatima
2002 (20th)	Assunta de Rossi	Hubog	Vanessa
2002 (20th)	Maricel Soriano	Mila	Mila Cabangon
2002 (20th)	Mylene Dizon	Gatas: Sa Dibdib ng Kaaway	Pilar
2003 (21st)
2003 (21st)	Vilma Santos	Dekada '70	Amanda Bartolome
2003 (21st)	Ara Mina	Mano Po	Richelle Go
2003 (21st)	Claudine Barretto	Kailangan Kita	Elena Duran
2003 (21st)	Maricel Soriano	Mano Po	Vera Go
2003 (21st)	Sharon Cuneta	Magkapatid	Dra. Cita Reyes
2004 (22nd)
2004 (22nd)	Maricel Soriano	Filipinas	Yolanda Filipinas
2004 (22nd)	Cherry Pie Picache	Bridal Shower	Katie
2004 (22nd)	Dina Bonnevie	Bridal Shower	Tates
2004 (22nd)	Laurice Guillen	Noon at Ngayon: Pagsasamang Kay Gana	
2004 (22nd)	Sharon Cuneta	Crying Ladies	Stella Mate
2005 (23rd)
2005 (23rd)	Claudine Barretto	Milan	Jenny
2005 (23rd)	Judy Ann Santos	Sabel	Sabel
2005 (23rd)	Maricel Soriano	I Will Survive	Cynthia
2005 (23rd)	Nora Aunor	Naglalayag	Judge Dorinda Vda. de Roces
2005 (23rd)	Vilma Santos	Mano Po III: My Love	Lilia Chiong-Yang
2006 (24th)
2006 (24th)	Zsa Zsa Padilla	Ako Legal Wife: Mano Po 4?	Chona Chong
2006 (24th)	Boots Anson-Roa	Blue Moon	Cora
2006 (24th)	Claudine Barretto	Dubai	Faye
2006 (24th)	Claudine Barretto	Nasaan Ka Man	Pilar
2006 (24th)	Irma Adlawan	Mga Pusang Gala	Marta
2007 (25th)
2007 (25th)	Judy Ann Santos	Kasal, Kasali, Kasalo	Angie
2007 (25th)	Gina Pareño	Kubrador	Amy
2007 (25th)	Judy Ann Santos	Don't Give Up on Us	Abelarda "Abby" Trinidad
2007 (25th)	Maricel Soriano	Inang Yaya	Norma
2008 (26th)
2008 (26th)	Maricel Soriano	Bahay Kubo: A Pinoy Mano Po!	Eden
2008 (26th)	Bea Alonzo	One More Chance	Basha Eugenio
2008 (26th)	Judy Ann Santos	Sakal, Sakali, Saklolo	Angie
2008 (26th)	Maricel Soriano	A Love Story	Joanna Villanueva
2008 (26th)	Regine Velasquez	Paano Kita Iibigin	Martee
2009 (27th)*
2009 (27th)*	Mylene Dizon	100	Joyce
2009 (27th)*	Ai-Ai delas Alas	Ang Tanging Ina N'yong Lahat	Ina Montecillo
2009 (27th)*	Anne Curtis	Baler	Feliza Reyes
2009 (27th)*	Judy Ann Santos	Ploning	Ploning
2009 (27th)*	Sharon Cuneta	Caregiver	Sarah Gonzales

=== 2010s ===
Year	Actor	Film	Role
2010 (28th)
2010 (28th)	No awards given for this year.		
2011 (29th)*
2011 (29th)*	Lorna Tolentino	Sa 'Yo Lamang	Amanda
2011 (29th)*	Ai-Ai delas Alas	Ang Tanging Ina Mo: Last na 'To!	Ina Montecillo
2011 (29th)*	Claudine Barretto	In Your Eyes	Ciara delos Santos
2011 (29th)*	Jennylyn Mercado	Rosario	Rosario
2011 (29th)*	Judy Ann Santos	Hating Kapatid	Rica
2012 (30th)
2012 (30th)	Maja Salvador	Thelma	Thelma Molino
2012 (30th)	Eugene Domingo	Ang Babae sa Septic Tank	Mila
2012 (30th)	KC Concepcion	Forever and a Day	Raffy
2012 (30th)	Lovi Poe	My Neighbor's Wife	Giselle
2012 (30th)	Maricel Soriano	Yesterday, Today, Tomorrow	Mariel
2013 (31st)
2013 (31st)	Angel Locsin	One More Try	Grace
2013 (31st)	Angelica Panganiban	Every Breath U Take	Majoy Marasigan
2013 (31st)	Bea Alonzo	The Mistress	Rosario Alfonso
2013 (31st)	Nora Aunor	Thy Womb	Shaleha
2013 (31st)	Pokwang	A Mother's Story	Remedios "Medy" Santos
2013 (31st)	Vilma Santos	The Healing	Seth
2014 (32nd)
2014 (32nd)	No awards given for this year.		
2015 (33rd)
2015 (33rd)	No awards given for this year.		
2016 (34th)
2016 (34th)	Bea Alonzo	The Love Affair	Atty. Adrianne "Adie" Valiente
2016 (34th)	Angelica Panganiban	That Thing Called Tadhana	Mace Castillo
2016 (34th)	Dawn Zulueta	The Love Affair	Patricia "Trisha" Ramos
2016 (34th)	Gwen Zamora	Apocalypse Child	Serena
2016 (34th)	Meryll Soriano	Honor Thy Father	Kaye
2017 (35th)
2017 (35th)	Hasmine Kilip	Pamilya Ordinaryo	Jane
2017 (35th)	Angeli Bayani	Ned's Project	Ned
2017 (35th)	Cherry Pie Picache	Pauwi Na	Aling Remedios
2017 (35th)	Jaclyn Jose	Ma' Rosa	Rosa Reyes
2017 (35th)	Jaclyn Jose	Patay na si Hesus	Iyay
2017 (35th)	Julia Barretto	Vince & Kath & James	Kath
2017 (35th)	Meryll Soriano	Pauwi Na	Isabel
2018 (36th)
2018 (36th)	Joanna Ampil	Ang Larawan	Candida Marasigan
2018 (36th)	Agot Isidro	Changing Partners	Alex
2018 (36th)	Alessandra de Rossi	Kita Kita	Lea
2018 (36th)	Dexter Doria	Paki	
2018 (36th)	Erich Gonzales	Siargao	Laura
2018 (36th)	Eula Valdez	Neomanila	Irma
2018 (36th)	Jally Nae Gabaliga	The Chanters	Sarah Mae
2018 (36th)	Julia Barretto	Love You to the Stars and Back	Mika
2019 (37th)
2019 (37th)	Glaiza de Castro	Liway	Liway
2019 (37th)	Agot Isidro	Changing Partners	Alex
2019 (37th)	Ai-Ai delas Alas	School Service	Nanay Rita
2019 (37th)	Angelica Panganiban	Exes Baggage	Pia
2019 (37th)	Anne Curtis	Sid & Aya: Not a Love Story	Aya

=== 2020s ===
Year	Actor	Film	Role
2020 (38th)
2020 (38th)	Judy Ann Santos	Mindanao	Saima Datupalo
2020 (38th)	Kathryn Bernardo	Hello, Love, Goodbye	Joy Marie Fabregas
2020 (38th)	Ruby Ruiz	Iska	Iska
2020 (38th)	Shamaine Buencamino	Sunshine Family	Sonya Mapalad
2020 (38th)	Sylvia Sanchez	Jesusa	Jesusa
2021
2021	No awards given for this year.		
2022
2022	No awards given for this year.		
2023 (39th)
2023 (39th)	Heaven Peralejo	Nanahimik ang Gabi	Me-Ann
2023 (39th)	Belle Mariano	An Inconvenient Love	Ayef
2023 (39th)	Cindy Miranda	Reroute	Trina
2023 (39th)	Cristine Reyes	Maid in Malacañang	Imee Marcos
2023 (39th)	Liza Lorena	Family Matters	Eleanor Florencio
2024 (40th)
2024 (40th)	Maricel Soriano	In His Mother's Eyes	Lucy
2024 (40th)	Charlie Dizon	Third World Romance	Britney
2024 (40th)	Kathryn Bernardo	A Very Good Girl	Philomena Angeles
2024 (40th)	Marian Rivera	Rewind	Mary Nuñez
2024 (40th)	Vilma Santos	When I Met You in Tokyo	Azon

== Multiple wins ==
The following individuals have won two or more Luna Awards for Best Actress:

Wins	Actor	Nominations	First Win	Latest Win
4	Lorna Tolentino	5	Maging Akin Ka Lamang (1988)	Sa 'Yo Lamang (2011)*
4	Maricel Soriano	17	Nasaan ang Puso (1998)	In His Mother's Eyes (2024)
4	Nora Aunor	13	Bilangin ang Bituin sa Langit (1990)	The Flor Contemplacion Story (1996)
4	Vilma Santos	14	Relasyon (1983)	Dekada '70 (2003)
2	Judy Ann Santos	7	Kasal, Kasali, Kasalo (2007)	Mindanao (2020)
2	Sharon Cuneta	5	Sa Hirap at Ginhawa (1985)	Madrasta (1997)

^{*The 27th and 29th Luna Awards were held on the same day due to financial difficulties.}
