= Luna Awards =

Annual Philippine film award

- Awarded for: Outstanding achievements in Filipino cinema
- Country: Philippines
- Presented by: Film Academy of the Philippines
- First award: April 27, 1983; 43 years ago
- Website: filmacademy.gov.ph

The Luna Awards are awards presented by the Film Academy of the Philippines (FAP) to recognize outstanding achievements in Filipino film industry based on artistic and technical merit as assessed by the Academy's voting membership. It is considered as the most prestigious industry award in the Philippines, and is the final award of the season, being held in December since 2026. It is part of the four awards that constitute a grand slam, with the Luna being the only industry award, FAMAS and Star being press awards, and the Gawad Urian being a critic award.

The awards are presented annually during a ceremony in Manila. The first ceremony was held in 1983.

== History ==
The Film Academy of the Philippines was established in 1981 through the Executive Order 640-A. The Academy's mandate, aside from serving as an umbrella organization of different organization working in the film industry, is to recognize the outstanding achievements in the industry annually, essentially becoming as an official Philippine counterpart to the Academy of Motion Picture Arts and Sciences in the United States. The inaugural ceremony of the Academy, known simply as the Film Academy of the Philippines Awards or FAP Awards, was held in April 27, 1983 at the Manila Film Center honoring the best films of 1982. The first tie in the award's history was recorded at the first ceremony, with Vilma Santos and Nora Aunor sharing the Best Actress award. Philp Salvador won the first Best Actor award and went on to set the record for actor with the most wins, winning seven.

Through the late 1980s and 1990s, the ceremony grew into one of the country's major film honors, alongside FAMAS and Gaward Urian. This period was marked by notable award sweeps, particularly by actors such as Nora Aunor and Vilma Santos, who frequently won top honors across these major bodies in the same year. Winning the four awards (with the inclusion of the Star Awards) in the same year became popularly known in the Philippine film industry as a grand slam.

The awards were officially called the Luna Awards starting in 2005. By the late 2000s, the Academy experienced financial strain from the lack of government funding and the reduction of its share from the earnings of the Metro Manila Film Festival, historically its primary funding source. As a result, the traditionally grand ceremony galas were scaled down, and several ceremonies cancelled, including those in 2010, 2014, and 2015. Due to budget constraints and operational delays, the 27th and 29th ceremonies were held concurrently on the same day on July 10, 2011 to honor the films released in 2008 and 2010, and skipping the 28th ceremony. In 2016, Heneral Luna won ten awards, including Best Picture, setting record for film with the most wins.

== Luna statuette ==
The Luna statuette.

In 2005, Luna was chosen as the new name for the awards from the 221 names submitted to the contest. Romeo Cando and Baltazar dela Cruz won the prize of ₱5000 for naming it. The word "Luna" means moon in different languages. Luna is also the Roman goddess of moon. It is also can be reflected in the idiom "shoot for the moon" which means to aspire for the seemingly unreachable because winning a Luna Award is something difficult to achieve.

The Luna statuette is given to the winners of each year's awards. Made of aluminum cast and weighting four kilograms, it depicts a muse in a long hair and flowing dress, holding a wreath and stands on 12 circular steps that represents the total of the guilds that is part of the academy at the time. Production designer Angel Tantoco is credited as the designer of the statuette in 1981, with an unnamed Juan Luna painting serving as an inspiration.

== Nomination ==
=== Voters ===
The Film Academy of the Philippines, composed of different independent professional guilds, has more than 2,000 voting members as of 2026. While all members are admitted to the academy through a membership in a professional guild, they are divided into different "sectors", with each representing different discipline in film production. The academy and its member guilds do not disclose its membership.

=== Rules ===
For a film to eligible, it should be released and have a commercial run for at least three days from January 1 to December 31 of the previous year. The voting process of Luna Awards was formulated by the academy with the help of Asian Institute of Management (AIM). It was partially implemented in 2004 and fully implemented in 2005. It is done by a three-body system composed of the citers, nominators and voters. A citer can also be a voter but cannot be a nominator.

The citers indicate whether a work should be cited or not. The cited works move on the next round. Ten seats are allocated for each guild focused on the professions of direction, performance, screenplay, cinematography, production design, editing, musical score, and sound. Another ten seats are allocated for a non-category guild, totaling to 90 seats.

In the second round, a nominator should be a previous nominee in any major film awards like Luna, FAMAS, Urian and Metro Manila Film Festival. Five seats are assigned for each profession, adding up to 40 seats. They would rank all cited works from best to worst, with the two to five highest scorers becoming the nominees. To become a nominee in Best Picture, a film should have three nominations and one of these nominations should be in Best Direction or Best Screenplay.

The nominees would then move on the last round where voters would cast their votes. Fifteen seats are designated per profession and another fifteen for a non-category guild, numbering to 135 seats. The winners would then be announced in the awards night.

In 2026, the Academy introduced a new voting system. The a pre-nomination round is held to determine eligible films by selected film critics, industry leaders, academics, film organizations, cultural agencies, and other award-giving bodies. This creates a shortlist for the nominations, where members of the academy vote within their sectoral categories to determine the nominees in each categories. Once the nominees are determined, all members then vote for all categories to determine the winners. The academy uses the Single Transferable Vote preferential system and Droop quota formula since 2026.

== Categories ==
=== Current categories ===
- Best Picture
- Best Direction
- Best Actor
- Best Actress
- Best Supporting Actor
- Best Supporting Actress
- Best Screenplay
- Best Cinematography
- Best Production Design
- Best Editing
- Best Musical Score
- Best Sound

=== Special honors ===
- Golden Reel Award
- Fernando Poe, Jr. Lifetime Achievement Award
- Manuel de Leon Award for Exemplary Achievements
- Lamberto Avellana Memorial Award

=== Defunct categories ===
- Best Child Performer

== Award ceremonies ==
The following is a list of all ceremonies since the award's inception in 1983 as FAP Awards and as Luna Awards since 2005.

Ceremony	Date	Best Picture	Host(s)	Venue
1st FAP Awards	April 27, 1983	Batch '81	—	Manila Film Center
2nd FAP Awards	1984	Pieta		
3rd FAP Awards	1985	Sister Stella L.		
4th FAP Awards	1986	Bayan Ko		
5th FAP Awards	April 10, 1987	Gabi Na, Kumander	—	Metropolitan Theater
6th FAP Awards	May 28, 1988	Saan Nagtatago ang Pag-ibig?	—	Philippine International Convention Center
7th FAP Awards	April 7, 1989	Boy Negro	—	Rizal Theater
8th FAP Awards	1990	Bilangin ang Bituin sa Langit		
9th FAP Awards	May 25, 1991	Dirty Affair	—	Philippine International Convention Center
10th FAP Awards	March 29, 1992	Ipagpatawad Mo	Rudy Fernandez, Bong Revilla, Phillip Salvador, Lorna Tolentino	Philippine International Convention Center
11th FAP Awards	March 28, 1993	Ikaw Pa Lang ang Minahal	—	Philippine International Convention Center
12th FAP Awards	April 23, 1994	Masahol Pa sa Hayop	—	Philippine International Convention Center
13th FAP Awards	June 13, 1995	Pangako ng Kahapon	—	Philippine International Convention Center
14th FAP Awards	June 1, 1996	The Flor Contemplacion Story	Mikee Cojuangco, Pops Fernandez, Francis Magalona, Aga Muhlach	Westin Philippine Plaza
15th FAP Awards	1997	Hangga't May Hininga		
16th FAP Awards	1998	Eseng ng Tondo		
17th FAP Awards	1999	Bata, Bata... Pa'no Ka Ginawa?		
18th FAP Awards	2000	Bulaklak ng Maynila		
19th FAP Awards	May 5, 2001	Tanging Yaman		
20th FAP Awards	March 23, 2002	Abakada... Ina		University of the Philippines Theater
21st FAP Awards	March 29, 2003	Lapu-Lapu	—	University of the Philippines Theater
22nd FAP Awards	July 3, 2004	Magnifico	Ogie Alcasid, Pops Fernandez	Cultural Center of the Philippines
23rd Luna Awards	May 14, 2005	Aishite Imasu 1941	Cherie Gil, Martin Nievera	The Westin Philippine Plaza
24th Luna Awards	September 16, 2006	Blue Moon	Marvin Agustin, Claudine Barretto, John Lloyd Cruz, Jolina Magdangal, Lani Mercado. Bong Revilla	PAGCOR Grand Theater
25th Luna Awards	December 27, 2007	Kasal, Kasali, Kasalo	Gina Alajar, Rez Cortez	Club Filipino
26th Luna Awards	February 8, 2009	Baler	Gina Alajar, Robert Arevalo, Tirso Cruz III, Lorna Tolentino	Mandarin Oriental Suites
27th Luna Awards	July 10, 2011	Rosario	Boots Anson-Roa, Robert Arevalo	Quezon City Sports Club
28th Luna Awards	Not held			
29th Luna Awards	July 10, 2011	Emir	Boots Anson-Roa, Robert Arevalo	Quezon City Sports Club
30th Luna Awards	August 26, 2012	Manila Kingpin: The Asiong Salonga Story	Rez Cortez, Katya Santos	Quezon City Sports Club
31st Luna Awards	June 1, 2013	El Presidente	Rez Cortez, Leroy dela Fuente, Lesley Martinez	Quezon City Sports Club
32nd Luna Awards	Not held			
33rd Luna Awards	Not held			
34th Luna Awards	September 18, 2016	Heneral Luna	Rez Cortez	Quezon City Sports Club
35th Luna Awards	August 26, 2017	Die Beautiful	—	Resorts World Manila
36th Luna Awards	September 29, 2018	Ang Larawan	—	Resorts World Manila
37th Luna Awards	November 30, 2019	Goyo: The Boy General	Jon Santos	Maybank Performing Arts Theater
38th Luna Awards	December 18, 2020	Mindanao	—	Online due to COVID-19 pandemic
39th Luna Awards	August 26, 2023	Family Matters	Rico Robles	Quezon City Sports Club
40th Luna Awards	August 3, 2024	GomBurZa	Karla Henry-Ammann	IBG-KAL Theater, UP Diliman
41st Luna Awards	December 10, 2026	TBD	TBD	Manila Hotel

== Hall of Fame ==
An individual is inducted to the Luna Awards Hall of Fame if he/she won at least five competitive awards. Years listed are based on when they garnered their fifth trophy. Their total number of awards are also listed.

- Willy Cruz (1987): 13 awards
- Romy Vitug (1988): 8 awards
- Phillip Salvador (1994): 8 awards
- Edgardo Vinarao (1991): 7 awards
- Ricky Lee (1996): 7 awards
- Augusto Salvador (1996): 7 awards
- George Canseco (1996): 6 awards
- Ramon Reyes (2000): 6 awards
- Rolly Ruta (1989): 5 awards
- Vic Macamay (1998): 5 awards
- Joel Lamangan (2006): 5 awards
