= 40th Luna Awards =

2024 Philippine film awards ceremony

- Date: August 3, 2024
- Site: IBG-KAL Theater, University of the Philippines Diliman

Highlights
- Best Picture: GomBurZa
- Most awards: GomBurZa (5)
- Most nominations: When I Met You in Tokyo (10)

The 40th Luna Awards ceremony, presented by the Film Academy of the Philippines (FAP), honored the best Filipino films of 2023. The Luna Awards ceremony is held on August 3, 2024 at the IBG-KALTheater, University of the Philippines Diliman.

== Winners and nominees ==
Winners are listed first, highlighted in boldface.

Best Picture	Best Direction
**GomBurZa**; In His Mother's Eyes; Rewind; Third World Romance; When I Met You in Tokyo	**Pepe Diokno – GomBurZa**; Conrado Peru & Rommel Penesa – When I Met You in Tokyo; Dwein Baltazar – Third World Romance; Mae Cruz-Alviar – Rewind; She Andres – Maria
Best Actor	Best Actress
**Roderick Paulate – In His Mother's Eyes**; Carlo Aquino – Third World Romance; Cedrick Juan – GomBurZa; Christopher de Leon – When I Met You in Tokyo; Dingdong Dantes – Rewind	**Maricel Soriano – In His Mother's Eyes**; Charlie Dizon – Third World Romance; Kathryn Bernardo – A Very Good Girl; Marian Rivera – Rewind; Vilma Santos – When I Met You in Tokyo
Best Supporting Actor	Best Supporting Actress
**LA Santos – In His Mother's Eyes**; Archi Adamos – Third World Romance; Elijah Canlas – GomBurZa; Pepe Herrera – Rewind; Piolo Pascual – GomBurZa	**Ana Abad Santos – Third World Romance**; Angel Aquino – A Very Good Girl; Cassy Legaspi – When I Met You in Tokyo; Chienna Filomeno – A Very Good Girl; Iyah Mina – Third World Romance
Best Screenplay	Best Cinematography
**About Us but Not About Us**; Five Breakups and a Romance; In His Mother's Eyes; Rewind; When I Met You in Tokyo	**GomBurZa**; A Very Good Girl; About Us but Not About Us; Firefly; Five Breakups and a Romance
Best Production Design	Best Editing
**GomBurZa**; A Very Good Girl; Rewind; Third World Romance; When I Met You in Tokyo	**Third World Romance**; GomBurZa; Maria; Rewind; When I Met You in Tokyo
Best Musical Score	Best Sound
**When I Met You in Tokyo**; A Very Good Girl; Firefly; Five Breakups and a Romance; In His Mother's Eyes	**GomBurZa**; Gitling; Huling Palabas; Rewind; When I Met You in Tokyo

=== Special awards ===
The following honorary awards were also awarded.

- **Fernando Poe Jr.** **Lifetime Achievement Award –** Liza Diño-Seguerra
- **9th Golden Reel Award –** Ramon "Bong" Revilla Jr.
- **Lamberto Avellana Memorial Award –** Armando “Bing” Lao
- **Manuel de Leon Achievement Award –** Mayor Joy Belmonte
