= LA Santos =

Filipino singer and actor

- Born: Leonard Antonio Brioso Santos; January 27, 2000 (age 26); Las Piñas, Philippines
- Citizenship: Filipino
- Education: De La Salle–College of Saint Benilde
- Occupations: Actor; singer
- Years active: 2016–present
- Agent: Star Magic

Leonard Antonio Brioso Santos (born January 27, 2000) is a Filipino singer and actor. He is best known for his roles in Mars Ravelo's Darna (2022) and In His Mother's Eyes (2023). Santos' accolades include a FAMAS Award, Luna Award, a PMPC Star Award for Movies, Music, and Television.

== Early life and background ==
Leonard Antonio Brioso Santos was born on January 27, 2000, in Las Piñas, Philippines. He completed high school at the University of Santo Tomas in Manila and earned a degree in music production from De La Salle-College of Saint Benilde. Initially recruited by Star Magic as a musician, Santos later transitioned into acting.

== Business venture ==
In 2020, Santos became the founder and CEO of 7K Sounds, a music label launched under ABS-CBN Music. He is also one of the label's recording artists. The label's name refers to the more than 7,000 islands of the Philippines. Through the label, he launched the online show The Search for the Sound of Seven Thousand Christmas Songs, created to feature original compositions from emerging Filipino musicians. Santos also co-hosted the show alongside Gretchen Ho.

== Personal life ==
Santos was diagnosed with attention deficit hyperactivity disorder (ADHD) and level 2 autism at age four and did not speak until he was six.

In August 2024, he revealed that he was courting co-star Kira Balinger. Later that month, he shared that she had rejected his courtship, though they remained good friends.

== Discography ==
=== Studio albums ===
List of albums, with sales and certifications
Title	Album details	Notes	Ref.
L.A. Santos	Released: May 10, 2017; Label: Star Music		

=== Singles ===
Title	Year	Album	Ref.
"Hibang"	2020	Non-album single	
"Gitna ng Langit"	2021	Non-album single	
"Ano'ng Pangalan Mo?" (with CLR)	2021	Non-album single	

=== Soundtrack appearances ===
Title	Year	Film/Series	Ref.
"'Di Maghihiwalay"	2022	Mars Ravelo's Darna	
"Patawad Inay"	2023	In His Mother's Eyes	
"Tayo Lang"	2024	Maple Leaf Dreams	

== Acting credits ==
=== Film ===
Key
†	Denotes films that have not yet been released

LA Santos's film credits with year of release, film titles and roles
Year	Title	Role	Ref.
2019	Maria	Leo	
2022	Mamasapano: Now It Can Be Told	PO2 Jovalyn Lozano	
2023	In His Mother's Eyes	Tim	
2024	Maple Leaf Dreams	Macky	
2026	Mantsa	Carlo	

=== Television ===
Key
†	Denotes films that have not yet been released

LA Santos's television credits with year of release, television titles and roles
Year	Title	Role	Ref.
2020–2021	Ang Sa Iyo ay Akin	Alfred Vega	
2022–2023	Mars Ravelo's Darna	Richard Miscala	
2023	Love Bites: Boy Next Door	Bjorn	
2023	Nag-aapoy Na Damdamin	Dr. Francis Venturina	
2023	ASAP XP	Himself / performer	
2025	Sins of the Father	Xenon Agustin	
2026	Blood vs Duty	Agent Ryan Cruz	
2026	Miss Behave	Migo Alcera	

== Concerts ==
=== As headlining artist ===
Title	Date	Venue	Notes	Ref.
#petMalu	April 30, 2018	Music Museum	First solo concert	

=== As guest artist ===
Title	Headlining artist(s)	Date	Venue	Ref.
The New Stylistics Concert	The Stylistics	February 13, 2015	The Theatre at Solaire	
Timeless OPM	Rey Valera, Imelda Papin, Claire dela Fuente, and Rico J. Puno	February 14, 2018	Newport Performing Arts Theater, Resorts World Manila	
Christmas With Soul Divas	Patti Austin and Jaya	December 6, 2018	The Theatre at Solaire	
Imelda Papin Queen @45	Imelda Papin	October 26, 2019	Music Museum	

== Accolades ==
Awards and NominationsAwards and nominations received by LA Santos
Award	Year	Category	Nominated work	Result	Ref.
Aliw Awards	2017	Best New Artist	—N/a	Nominated	
Aliw Awards	2022	Best Male Pop Artist	—N/a	Won	
The EDDYS	2024	Best Original Theme Song (with Jonathan Manalo, FM Reyes)	In His Mother's Eyes ("Patawad, Inay")	Nominated	
FAMAS Award	2024	Best Supporting Actor	In His Mother's Eyes	Won	
FAMAS Award	2024	Best Original Theme Song (with Jonathan Manalo)	In His Mother's Eyes ("Patawad, Inay")	Nominated	
Gawad Dangal Filipino Awards	2024	Best Supporting Actor	In His Mother's Eyes	Won	
Luna Award	2024	Best Supporting Actor	In His Mother's Eyes	Won	
PMPC Star Awards for Movies	2021	New Movie Actor of the Year	Maria	Nominated	
PMPC Star Awards for Movies	2024	Movie Supporting Actor of the Year	In His Mother's Eyes	Won	
PMPC Star Awards for Movies	2024	Indie Movie Original Theme Song of the Year (with Jonathan Manalo, FM Reyes)	In His Mother's Eyes ("Patawad, Inay")	Nominated	
PMPC Star Awards for Movies	2025	Movie Loveteam of the Year (shared with Kira Balinger)	Maple Leaf Dreams	Nominated	
PMPC Star Awards for Music	2018	New Male Recording Artist of the Year	"L.A. Santos"	Won	
PMPC Star Awards for Music	2020	Revival Album of the Year	"Isang Linggong Pag-ibig"	Nominated	
PMPC Star Awards for Music	2024	Male Pop Artist of the Year	"'Di Maghihiwalay"	Won	
PMPC Star Awards for Television	2023	Best New Male TV Personality	Ang sa Iyo ay Akin	Won	
Sinag Maynila Film Festival	2024	Best Actor	Maple Leaf Dreams	Nominated	
