= Lapu-Lapu (film) =

- Directed by: William G. Mayo
- Written by: Jerry O. Tirazona
- Produced by: Florante H. Castillo; Lito Marcos; Mark Lapid; William G. Mayo; Wilson Chua
- Starring: Lito Lapid; Joyce Jimenez; Dante Rivero; Vic Vargas; Roi Vinzon; Jeric Raval
- Cinematography: Jun Dalawis
- Edited by: Ruben Pantua
- Music by: Blitz Padua
- Production company: Calinauan Cineworks
- Distributed by: EDL Productions
- Release date: December 25, 2002
- Running time: 126 minutes
- Country: Philippines
- Languages: Filipino; Cebuano; Spanish
- Budget: ₱35-₱50 million
- Box office: ₱5.7 million

Lapu-Lapu is a 2002 Filipino historical drama film co-produced and directed by William G. Mayo and written by Jerry O. Tirazona. It stars Lito Lapid as the titular datu, alongside Joyce Jimenez, Dante Rivero, Vic Vargas, Roi Vinzon, Jeric Raval, Ian Veneracion, Jess Lapid Jr., and Gloria Sevilla. Produced by Calinauan Cineworks, the film is based on the 1521 encounter of Datu Lapulapu and other pre-Hispanic Philippine natives with explorer Ferdinand Magellan and his crew, who were serving the Spanish Empire.

Lapu-Lapu was released on December 25, 2002, as part of the 28th Metro Manila Film Festival. Earning only ₱5.7 million by the end of the festival against a budget of at least ₱35 million, it was a box-office bomb. However, the film won seven FAP Awards, including Best Picture, Best Director (Mayo), and Best Actor (Lapid).

== Cast ==
- Lito Lapid as Lapu-Lapu
- Joyce Jimenez as Bulakna
- Dante Rivero as Magellan
- Vic Vargas as Raha Humabon
- Roi Vinzon as Datu Zula
- Jeric Raval as Maltug
- Ian Veneracion as Sebastian Del Cano
- Bob Soler as Pigafetta
- Jess Lapid Jr. as Zula's Man
- Gloria Sevilla as Reyna Bauga
- Cloyd Robinson as Padre Valderrama
- Renato del Prado as Itong
- Lucita Soriano as Mother of Katulanga
- Cris Daluz as Father of Katulanga
- Boy Alano as Lagum
- Lilia Cuntapay as a Babaylan
- Leon Miguel as Lapu-Lapu's Man
- Boy Roque as Kawati

== Production ==
A Spanish galleon replica was made for the film within a span of three months, and subsequently donated to a museum in Subic, Zambales after production. There were approximately 3,000 extras hired for the film.

== Reception ==
At the 28th Metro Manila Film Festival (MMFF), the film lost the Best Film award to Spirit Warriors: The Shortcut, upon which the producers threatened to sue the festival organizers due to suspicions of manipulation.

=== Box office ===
Lapu-Lapu was the least-earning film at the box office among the nine entries of the 28th MMFF.

=== Critical response ===
The Catholic Initiative for Enlightened Movie Appreciation (CINEMA) rated the film "morally acceptable" and "technically average", with praise held for Lito Lapid and Joyce Jimenez's performances, while criticisms were directed at the incongruous film score and the galleon ship used for production, stating that the latter was "unbelievable".

=== Accolades ===
Group	Category	Name	Result
2003 FAMAS Awards	Best Picture	Lapu-Lapu	Nominated
2003 FAP Awards	Best Picture	Lapu-Lapu	Won
2003 FAP Awards	Best Direction	William Mayo	Won
2003 FAP Awards	Best Actor	Lito Lapid	Won
2003 FAP Awards	Best Supporting Actor	Dante Rivero	Nominated
2003 FAP Awards	Best Supporting Actress	Maria Isabel Lopez	Nominated
2003 FAP Awards	Best Screenplay	Jerry Tirazona	Won
2003 FAP Awards	Best Musical Score	Blitz Padua	Won
2003 FAP Awards	Best Cinematography	Jun Dalawis	Nominated
2003 FAP Awards	Best Sound	Danny Lorilla	Won
2003 FAP Awards	Best Original Song	"Mabuhay ang Kalayaan" by Coritha	Won
