= A Very Good Girl =

2023 dark comedy thriller film by Petersen Vargas

- Theatrical release poster
- Directed by: Petersen Vargas
- Screenplay by: Marionne Dominique Mancol; Daniel S. Saniana; Jumbo A. Albano
- Story by: Marionne Dominique Mancol
- Produced by: Carlo L. Katigbak; Kriz G. Gazmen; John Leo D. Garcia; Carmi G. Raymundo
- Starring: Kathryn Bernardo; Dolly de Leon
- Cinematography: Noel Teehankee
- Edited by: Benjamin Tolentino
- Music by: Andrew R. Florentino
- Production company: Star Cinema
- Distributed by: ABS-CBN Film Productions
- Release dates: September 27, 2023 (Philippines); October 6, 2023 (United States)
- Running time: 117 minutes
- Country: Philippines
- Languages: Filipino; English
- Budget: ₱120 million ($2 million)
- Box office: ₱100 million ($1.79 million)

A Very Good Girl is a 2023 Filipino black comedy thriller film directed by Petersen Vargas and written by Marionne Dominique Mancol, Daniel Saniana, and Jumbo A. Albano from a story concept developed by Mancol. It stars Kathryn Bernardo and Dolly de Leon, with the supporting cast includes Kaori Oinuma, Jake Ejercito, and Angel Aquino.

Produced and released by Star Cinema, the film was theatrically released nationwide in the Philippines on September 27, 2023.

== Plot ==
Mercy is fired and blacklisted by her tyrannical employer, “Mother” Molly Suzara, who pretends to be a caring entrepreneur. After Mercy's mother, Conchita, is fatally hit by one of Molly's company vehicles, Mercy vows revenge. Over the next five years, she amasses a fortune through fraud to pose as a rich entrepreneur named Philo, aiming to infiltrate Molly's circle and expose her past.

Philo gains Molly's attention by buying a relic at an auction and gifting it to her. She befriends Zab, Molly's brand endorser and the daughter of Molly's money-laundering partner. Zab plans to leave the country without Molly's knowledge. At Zab's birthday party, Philo reveals Zab's plans, leading Molly to expose Zab's affair. Zab retaliates by revealing Molly's blackmail information, causing her friends to abandon her. Philo wins Molly's friendship by uploading a sex tape of Zab at Molly's request.

Philo infiltrates Molly's office by arranging for her secretary Gene to get a job abroad and threatening another secretary, Charles, to expose his misogynist behavior unless he provides information on Molly's illegal activities. Despite cutting off Charles' penis and convincing him to turn whistleblower, Molly avoids imprisonment and restores her reputation. Philo spends her illegally obtained money on a grand birthday party for Molly, who declines to celebrate, saying she has lost trust in everyone. Philo arranges for a knifeman to stab her while she pretends to shield Molly, gaining her sympathy. Molly, treating Philo like a daughter, reveals she was an orphan who had an abortion and regrets her role in Conchita's death, unaware she is speaking to her daughter. Philo reveals she accidentally caused her unborn sister's death by making her father's pregnant mistress miscarry during an argument.

One day, Rigel, claiming to be Mercy's unborn sister, reconnects with her. Mercy secretly records Molly's confession about Conchita's death and presents it to the police, but it's deemed inadmissible. Mercy then learns from her friend Karen that her goddaughter Lovely has been injured in a gas explosion, with Rigel missing. Desperate, Philo seeks help from Molly, only to find her kissing Rigel, who triggered the explosion on Molly's orders.

After Rigel leaves, Molly reveals she had discovered Mercy's past and mocks her for her poverty, naivety, and mother's death. Enraged, Mercy stabs Molly in the neck but is knocked down. Molly flees, pursued by Mercy, leading to a confrontation at her stepmother's bedside. Molly tricks Mercy into fatally stabbing her stepmother, claiming they are now even. Molly asserts that Mercy is no different from her, prompting Mercy to choke her but ultimately let her go, declaring herself the better person. As Mercy leaves, Molly follows to mock her but is fatally hit by a car. Mercy, at peace, appears to ascend into the sky.

== Cast ==
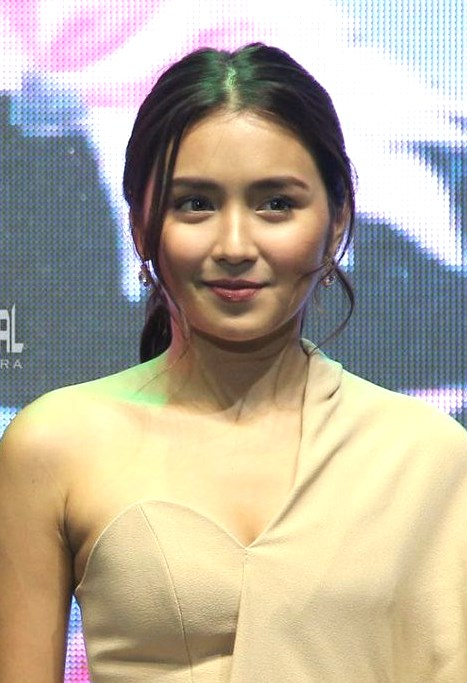
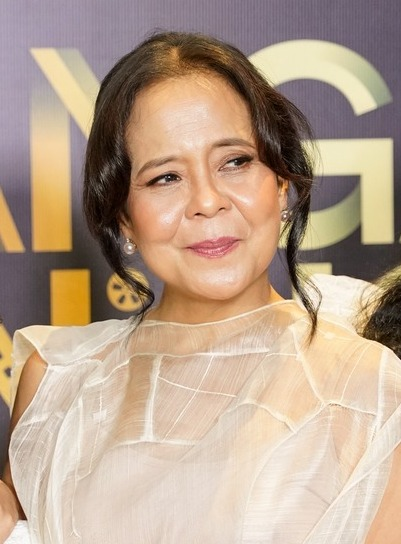
Kathryn Bernardo (pictured in 2016) and Dolly de Leon (pictured in 2023) played the lead roles of Philo and Molly, respectively.
- Kathryn Bernardo as Philomena "Philo" Angeles / Mercedes "Mercy" Novela
- Dolly de Leon as Molly "Mother" Suzara
- Angel Aquino as Conchita Novela
- Chie Filomeno as Zab Omila
- Jake Ejercito as Charles Monteron
- Donna Cariaga as Karen Merino
- Kaori Oinuma as Rigel Abalos
- Gillian Vicencio as Joenna Ondon
- Ana Abad Santos as Gene
- Althea Ruedas as young Mercy
- Natania Guerrero as Lovely
- Nour Hooshmand as Alma Feliciano
- Kakki Teodoro as Thea

== Production ==
In late March 2023, during Bernardo's new movie alert event that was shown through Star Magic's YouTube channel, it was announced that she is set to star with the globally acclaimed actress Dolly de Leon in a movie.

The production began filming in May 2023 and officially wrapped late July 2023.

== Promotions and marketing ==
=== Pre-release ===
The official teaser of the film was released on August 4, 2023. On August 11, 2023, a teaser poster was released and was seen in different social media platforms of Star Cinema and other related accounts.

On August 23, 2023, a media conference was held. It was attended by the film's lead stars Kathryn Bernardo and Dolly de Leon, along with its cast members, creators, and director, Petersen Vargas. The official trailer and poster were also unveiled during the event.

== Release ==
A Very Good Girl was released in Philippine cinemas nationwide on September 27, 2023. A day before its general release, a premiere night of the film was held at SM Megamall on September 26, 2023, and it was attended by the film's cast and crew members including the lead stars Kathryn Bernardo and Dolly de Leon, and director Petersen Vargas. The event was also attended by many of ABS-CBN's homegrown talents including music groups BGYO and BINI as well as GMA Network's resident talents Alden Richards, Mavy Legaspi, and Kyline Alcantara, and veteran actor and Bernardo's co-star in 2 Good 2 Be True, Ronaldo Valdez.

=== Overseas release ===
A Very Good Girl was released in the United States on October 6, 2023. It was previously scheduled for October 13, 2023. Two days before the general release for American audiences, a Hollywood premiere was held at the Pacific Design Theater in West Hollywood on October 4, 2023, with the attendance of the lead stars, ABS-CBN executives, and Filipino-American celebrities including social media personality and influencer Bretman Rock, actress Ginger Gonzaga, and drag queen Manila Luzon.

== Reception ==
=== Box office ===
The film earned a total of ₱10 million from over 250 cinemas in the Philippines on its opening day. The film has earned over ₱40 million in its opening weekend as of September 30, 2023. As of October 10, 2023, the film has earned ₱100 million.

=== Critical response ===
Film critic Fred Hawson, writing for ABS-CBN News, gave the film a rating of 8 out of 10 stars and praised the performances of Bernardo and de Leon, further adding: "This was quite a roller-coaster ride of a film with an over-the-top camp value, with haute couture dresses and high society production design all the way."

Wanggo Gallaga of ClickTheCity.com gave the film 4 stars out of 5 stars and he wrote: "This movie was such a joy for me to watch because it was not what I was expecting (and I loved that), even if it ended the way I think a Star Cinema movie would end. The film was crazy and irreverent, and I thought it could have even pushed it more. But where it went is already a step forward. And at the very center of it all, A Very Good Girl is so enjoyable because of Kathryn Bernardo’s commitment to the character and the genre. This is a superstar turn."

== Accolades ==
Award	Year	Category	Nominee	Result	Ref
2024	Gawad Lasallianeta Awards	Most Outstanding Filipino Film	A Very Good Girl	Won	
2024	Gawad Lasallianeta Awards	Most Outstanding Actress	Kathryn Bernardo	Won	
2024	VP Choice Awards	Movie of the Year	A Very Good Girl	Nominated	
2024	VP Choice Awards	Movie Actress of the Year	Kathryn Bernardo	Nominated	
2024	VP Choice Awards	Movie Director of the Year	Petersen Vargas	Nominated	
2024	VP Choice Awards	Supporting Movie Actor of the Year	Jake Ejercito	Nominated	
2024	VP Choice Awards	Supporting Movie Actress of the Year	Donna Cariaga	Nominated	
2024	72nd FAMAS Awards	Best Picture	A Very Good Girl	Nominated	
2024	72nd FAMAS Awards	Best Actress	Kathryn Bernardo	Won	
2024	72nd FAMAS Awards	Best Director	Petersen Vargas	Nominated	
2024	72nd FAMAS Awards	Best Supporting Actress	Dolly de Leon	Nominated	
2024	72nd FAMAS Awards	Best Cinematography	Noel Teehankee	Nominated	
2024	72nd FAMAS Awards	Best Editing	Benjamin Gonzales Tolentino	Nominated	
2024	72nd FAMAS Awards	Best Production Design	Cheska Salangsang	Nominated	
2024	72nd FAMAS Awards	Best Musical Score	Andrew Florentino	Nominated	
2024	52nd GMMSF - Box Office Entertainment Awards	Box Office Queen	Kathryn Bernardo	Won	
2024	47th Gawad Urian Award	Best Actress	Kathryn Bernardo	Nominated	
2024	7th EDDY'S Award	Box Office Heroes	Kathryn Bernardo	Won	
2024	7th EDDY'S Award	Best Actress	Kathryn Bernardo	Nominated	
2024	7th EDDY'S Award	Best Cinematography	Noel Teehankee	Nominated	
2024	7th EDDY'S Award	Best Editing	Benjamin Tolentino	Nominated	
2024	40th PMPC Star Awards for Movies	Movie Actress of the Year	Kathryn Bernardo	Nominated	
2024	40th PMPC Star Awards for Movies	Movie Cinematographer of the Year	Noel Teehankee	Nominated	
2024	40th PMPC Star Awards for Movies	Movie Musical Scorer of the Year	Andrew Florentino	Nominated	
2024	40th PMPC Star Awards for Movies	Movie Sound Engineer of the Year	Boom Suvagondha	Nominated	
2024	40th Luna Awards	Movie Actress of the Year	Kathryn Bernardo	Nominated	
2024	40th Luna Awards	Best Supporting Actress	Angel Aquino	Nominated	
2024	40th Luna Awards	Best Supporting Actress	Chie Filomeno	Nominated	
2024	40th Luna Awards	Best in Cinematography	Noel Teehankee	Nominated	
2024	40th Luna Awards	Best in Production Design	Cheska Florentino	Nominated	
2024	40th Luna Awards	Best Musical Scorer	Andrew Florentino	Nominated	
2024	2024 ContentAsia Awards	Best Asian Feature Film	A Very Good Girl	Bronze Award	
2024	26th Gawad PASADO	PinakaPASADOng Pelikula	A Very Good Girl	Nominated	
2024	26th Gawad PASADO	PinakaPASADOng Direktor	Petersen Vargas	Nominated	
2024	26th Gawad PASADO	PinakaPASADOng Aktres	Kathryn Bernardo	Won	
2024	26th Gawad PASADO	PinakaPASADOng Katuwang na Aktres	Dolly de Leon	Won	
2024	26th Gawad PASADO	PinakaPASADOng Istorya	Marionne Dominique Mancol	Nominated	
2024	26th Gawad PASADO	PinakaPASADOng Dulang Pampelikula	Marionne Dominique Mancol, Jonathan Albano and Daniel Saniana	Nominated	
2024	26th Gawad PASADO	PinakaPASADOng Editing	Benjamin Tolentino	Nominated	
2024	26th Gawad PASADO	PinakaPASADOng Musika	Andrew Florentino	Nominated	
2024	26th Gawad PASADO	PinakaPASADOng Tunog	Boom Suvagondha	Nominated	
2024	Asian Academy Creative Awards	Best Actress in a Leading Role	Kathryn Bernardo	Won	
