= 20th FAP Awards =

2002 Philippine film awards ceremony

- Date: March 23, 2002
- Produced by: Film Academy of the Philippines

Highlights
- Best Picture: Abakada... Ina
- Most awards: Abakada... Ina (7)

The 20th FAP Awards (now known as Luna Awards) ceremony, presented by the Film Academy of the Philippines (FAP), took place on March 23, 2002, at the UP Theater. Seen as the Philippine counterpart to the Academy Awards, the FAP Awards honors films released in 2001. Fernando Poe Jr., labelled as the King of Philippine Movies, accepts the Golden Reel Award. Meanwhile, industry veterans Gloria Romero and Nida Blanca both receive the Lifetime Achievement Award. This is a posthumous recognition for Nida Blanca, who died on November 7, 2001.

== Winners and nominees ==
=== Awards ===
Winners are listed first, highlighted in boldface.

Best Picture	Best Direction
**Abakada... Ina – Viva Films**; Bagong Buwan – Star Cinema; Hubog – Good Harvest Films; Mila – Star Cinema; Yamashita: The Tiger's Treasure – MAQ Productions	**Eddie Garcia –** **Abakada... Ina**; Chito S. Roño – Yamashita: The Tiger's Treasure; Joel Lamangan – Hubog; Joey del Rosario – Kaaway Hanggang Hukay; Marilou Diaz-Abaya – Bagong Buwan
Best Actor	Best Actress
**Ricky Davao – Minsan May Isang Puso**; Cesar Montano – Bagong Buwan; Diether Ocampo – La Vida Rosa; Jay Manalo – Hubog; Piolo Pascual – Mila	**Lorna Tolentino – Abakada... Ina**; Amy Austria – Bagong Buwan; Assunta de Rossi – Hubog; Maricel Soriano – Mila; Mylene Dizon – Gatas... Sa Dibdib ng Kaaway
Best Supporting Actor	Best Supporting Actress
**Dante Rivero – Tuhog**; Carlo Aquino – Bagong Buwan; Jericho Rosales – Bagong Buwan; Nonie Buencamino – Bagong Buwan; Ronnie Lazaro – Bagong Buwan	**Caridad Sanchez – Bagong Buwan**; Alessandra de Rossi – Hubog; Ana Capri – Minsan May Isang Puso; Elizabeth Oropesa – Balahibong Pusa; Jaclyn Jose – Tuhog
Best Screenplay	Best Cinematography
**Abakada... Ina**; Kaaway Hanggang Hukay; La Vida Rosa; Mila; Yamashita: The Tiger's Treasure	**Abakada... Ina**
Best Production Designer	Best Editing
**Bagong Buwan**	**Abakada... Ina**
Best Sound	Best Original Theme
**Abakada... Ina**	**Susmaryosep! Four Fathers**
Best Score
**Parehas ang Laban**

== Special awards ==
Award(s)	Recipient(s)
Lifetime Achievement Award	Gloria Romero
Lifetime Achievement Award	Nida Blanca
Golden Reel Award	Fernando Poe Jr.
Celebrity of the Night	Gretchen Barretto
Students' Short Films	Ulirat (1st)
Students' Short Films	Deadline (2nd)
Students' Short Films	Palara (3rd)
