= In His Mother's Eyes =

2023 Philippine drama film

- Theatrical release poster
- Directed by: FM Reyes
- Screenplay by: Jerry Gracio; Gina Marissa Tagasa
- Story by: Popoy Reyes
- Produced by: Ellen Nicolas Criste
- Starring: Maricel Soriano; Roderick Paulate; LA Santos
- Cinematography: Neil Daza; Rap Ramirez
- Edited by: Vanessa De Leon
- Music by: Carmina Cuya
- Production company: 7K Entertainment
- Distributed by: Viva Films
- Release date: November 29, 2023
- Running time: 107 minutes
- Country: Philippines
- Language: Filipino

In His Mother's Eyes is a 2023 Philippine drama film directed by FM Reyes in his directorial debut from the screenplay of Jerry Gracio and Gina Marissa Tagasa. It stars Maricel Soriano, Roderick Paulate and LA Santos. The film follows the story of Tim, a special child who was left in the care of his uncle Bibs by his working mother Lucy for several years.

== Plot ==
Lucy (Maricel Soriano) is a hardworking mother who made the difficult decision to leave her young son Tim (LA Santos) in the care of her brother Bibs (Roderick Paulate) so she could work abroad in Japan as a cultural dancer, hoping to provide a better future for her family. Tim has high-functioning autism, which means he struggles with communication and social interaction, but has an extraordinary talent for singing. Bibs takes on the responsibility of raising Tim with love and patience, becoming the stable father figure Tim desperately needs.

After many years, Lucy returns home, filled with hope to reconnect with Tim and rebuild their fractured relationship. However, Tim has grown attached to his uncle and finds it difficult to accept his mother, whose absence left a deep emotional scar. Bibs, too, harbors resentment and bitterness toward Lucy for abandoning her parental duties and leaving him with the full burden of raising a special-needs child.

As Lucy attempts to bridge the gap, she struggles to understand Tim’s world, his routines, his triggers, and his passion for music. Tim often becomes overwhelmed by sudden noises or changes in his environment, leading to anxious episodes that test Lucy’s patience. But with guidance from Bibs and Tim’s music teacher, Lucy begins to learn how to communicate with Tim in ways that make him feel safe and loved.

Meanwhile, Tim’s singing talent begins to shine through. Encouraged by Lucy, he participates in local singing contests, but the road is tough. Some people misunderstand or underestimate him because of his condition, and he faces judgment and bullying. Despite this, Tim’s performances move many, showcasing his pure heart and unique gift.

Throughout the film, there are tender moments where Lucy confronts her own guilt and regrets, recalling memories of her son’s early childhood and the sacrifices she made. She also faces challenges balancing her desire to reconnect with Tim and the reality that time has changed their family forever.

Bibs’ health starts to decline due to stress and age, which adds urgency to Lucy’s mission to take a more active role in Tim’s life. In a poignant scene, Bibs has a heart attack, and Tim’s distress triggers an intense emotional breakthrough where he calls Lucy “Mom” for the first time.

A local music competition where Tim performs both Bibs and Lucy are watching they saw Tim at the back of the line. Lucy immediately go to the event and confront everyone who's treating Tim unfairly and bullying him but Bibs stop her. Lucy is very confused and she don't know what she's going to do, she decide to leave Bibs and Tim alone and she live in the province for good.

Bibs learned that Lucy has a stage 4 Cancer and she's going to die very soon. Bibs and Tim stops her to leave and they welcome her back to their house. At the end of the film Lucy is very sick and dying but her sibling Bibs and her son Tim is beside her before her final moments.

== Cast ==
Main cast

- Maricel Soriano as Lucy
- Roderick Paulate as Bibs
- LA Santos as Tim

Supporting cast

- Maila Gumila as Dina
- Ogie Diaz as Bogart
- Ruby Ruiz as Tess
- Vivoree Esclito as Zuri
- Rochelle Pangilinan as Ellen
- Elyson De Dios as Raz
- Reign Parani as Gia
- Inah Evans as Student Vlogger
- Bong Gonzalez as Student Vlogger
- Nolo Lopez as Mr. Romero
- Skylee Alcalde as Young Tim

== Production ==
August 7, 2023 the cast and crew are started filming the film months after Roderick Paulate found guilty for graft and falsification of documents case for hiring "ghost" employees. In August 8, b617 Management share some behind the scenes photos of Roderick and Maricel in their Instagram account.

Direk FM Reyes said that the film is a love letter to parents everywhere.

He also added:

“It’s also a way of thanking my mother. They have the same story. When I was talking to LA, it’s really our way of thanking our parents, and LA loves his mom so much. When we were doing it, we were all a bit emotional every time we filmed a drama scene.”

== Release ==
The film is intended to be a MMFF entry but failed to secure the spot in the MMFF lineup. The film was released on November 29, 2023, under Viva Films.

== Reception ==
=== Critical response ===
Fred Hawson of News.ABS-CBN.com gave the film a rating of 4 out of 10 and he said: This uber melodramatic Filipino movie was clearly intended to be a tearjerker, so all the classic tropes were thrown in the mix. However, if only Lucy and Bibs did not keep major secrets between them, all this unnecessary fuss could have been avoided. Face-slapping confrontation scene aside, a rather desperate 11th hour twist had to be tacked on at the end, to squeeze out ever more tears before the reconciliatory finale. 4/10.

=== Accolades ===
Year	Awards	Category	Recipient	Result	Ref.
2024	2024 FAMAS Awards	FAMAS Award for Best Actress	Maricel Soriano	Nominated	
2024	2024 FAMAS Awards	FAMAS Award for Best Supporting Actor	LA Santos	Won	
2024	2024 FAMAS Awards	Famas Awards for Best Original Song	"Patawad Inay" — La Santos, Jonathan Manalo	Nominated	
2024	7th Eddys	Best Actress	Maricel Soriano	Nominated	
2024	7th Eddys	Best Supporting Actor	Roderick Paulate	Nominated	
2024	7th Eddys	Best Original Theme Song	"Patawad Inay" — LA Santos, Jonathan Manalo, FM Reyes	Nominated	
2024	Gawad Dangal Filipino Awards	Best Actress	Maricel Soriano	Won	
2024	Gawad Dangal Filipino Awards	Best Actor	Roderick Paulate	Won	
2024	Gawad Dangal Filipino Awards	Best Supporting Actor	LA Santos	Won	
2024	Gawad Dangal Filipino Awards	Best Director	FM Reyes	Won	
2024	Gawad Dangal Filipino Awards	Best Picture	In His Mother's Eyes	Won	
2024	40th PMPC Star Awards for Movies	Star Award for Movie Actress of the Year	Maricel Soriano	Won	
