= 22nd FAP Awards =

2004 Philippine film awards ceremony

- Date: July 3, 2004
- Site: Main Theater (Tanghalang Nicanor Abelardo), Cultural Center of the Philippines, Manila
- Hosted by: Ogie Alcasid; Pops Fernandez

Highlights
- Best Picture: Magnifico
- Most awards: Magnifico (6)
- Most nominations: Crying Ladies (9)

Television coverage
- Network: ABC

The 22nd FAP Awards were held on July 3, 2004 at the Cultural Center of the Philippines and they honored the best Filipino films of the year 2003. This is the last time that "FAP" was used as the name of the awards and they were renamed to "Luna" in the subsequent ceremonies. This is also the last time that the old voting process was used.

Crying Ladies received the most nominations with nine. It was followed by Magnifico and Mano Po 2: My Home with eight.

Magnifico gained most of the awards with six awards, including the Best Picture. The Director General's Ball was held in the PICC Forum right after the awards ceremony.

== Winners and nominees ==
Best Picture	Best Direction
Magnifico; Babae sa Breakwater; Crying Ladies; Filipinas; Mano Po 2: My Home	Maryo J. de los Reyes – Magnifico; Joel Lamangan – Ang Huling Birhen sa Lupa; Joel Lamangan – Filipinas; Mario O'Hara – Babae sa Breakwater; Mark Meily – Crying Ladies
Best Actor	Best Actress
Jiro Manio – Magnifico; Christopher de Leon – Mano Po 2: My Home; Richard Gomez – Filipinas	Maricel Soriano – Filipinas; Dina Bonnevie – Bridal Shower; Sharon Cuneta – Crying Ladies; Laurice Guillen – Noon at Ngayon: Pagsasamang Kay Ganda; Cherry Pie Picache – Bridal Shower
Best Supporting Actor	Best Supporting Actress
Eric Quizon – Crying Ladies; Paolo Contis – Noon at Ngayon: Pagsasamang Kay Ganda; Mark Gil – Magnifico; Jay Manalo – Mano Po 2: My Home	Gloria Romero – Magnifico; Hilda Koronel – Crying Ladies; Aiza Marquez – Noon at Ngayon: Pagsasamang Kay Ganda; Jennifer Sevilla – Kung Ako na Lang Sana
Best Screenplay	Best Cinematography
Michiko Yamamoto – Magnifico; Roy Iglesias – Mano Po 2: My Home; Chris Martinez – Bridal Shower; Mark Meily – Crying Ladies; Mario O'Hara – Babae sa Breakwater	J.A. Tadena – Mano Po 2: My Home; Romulo Araojo – Homecoming; Rey de Leon – Babae sa Breakwater; Eduardo Jacinto – Noon at Ngayon: Pagsasamang Kay Ganda; Rolly Manuel – Filipinas
Best Production Design	Best Editing
Rodell Cruz – Mano Po 2: My Home; Raymond Bajarias – Bridal Shower; Dante Nico Garcia – Keka	Vito Cajili – Malikmata; Danny Añonuevo – Crying Ladies; Manet Dayrit – Mano Po 2: My Home; Marya Ignacio – Filipinas; Tara Illenberger – Bridal Shower
Best Musical Score	Best Sound
Lutgardo Labad – Magnifico; Nonong Buencamino – Noon at Ngayon: Pagsasamang Kay Ganda; Von de Guzman – Mano Po 2: My Home; Vincent de Jesus – Crying Ladies; Raul Mitra – Pangarap Ko ang Ibigin Ka	Albert Michael Idioma – Malikmata; Raffy Magsaysay – Crying Ladies; Arnold Reodica – Magnifico; Ramon Reyes – Ang Huling Birhen sa Lupa

=== Special award ===
Lifetime Achievement Award
- Augusto Buenaventura

== Multiple nominations and awards ==
Nominations	Film
9	Crying Ladies
8	Magnifico
8	Mano Po 2: My Home
6	Filipinas
5	Bridal Shower
5	Noon at Ngayon: Pagsasamang Kay Ganda
4	Babae sa Breakwater
2	Ang Huling Birhen sa Lupa
2	Malikmata

Awards	Film
6	Magnifico
2	Malikmata
2	Mano Po 2: My Home
