= 39th Luna Awards =

2023 Philippine film awards ceremony

- Date: August 26, 2023
- Site: Quezon City Sports Club

Highlights
- Best Picture: Family Matters
- Most awards: Family Matters (4)
- Most nominations: Family Matters (10)

The 39th Luna Awards ceremony, presented by the Film Academy of the Philippines (FAP), honored the best Filipino films of 2022. As the duly accredited counterpart of the American Academy Awards, FAP was also in charge of sending the Philippines' entry for the International Feature Film at the Oscars. Citing a lack of funds and the effects of the COVID-19 pandemic as the reason, the organization decided to take a two-year hiatus from their responsibilities. They did not submit an entry for Oscars consideration nor did they hold the Luna Awards, prompting criticisms from other members of the industry. After the hiatus, FAP officer in charge Manny Morfe announces that the organization is reviving the Luna Awards and submitting a film for consideration at the Oscars because "we want everyone to know that we still exist and that this is our mandate for the industry." The ceremony is held on August 26, 2023 at the Quezon City Sports Club.

== Winners and nominees ==
Winners are listed first, highlighted in boldface.

Best Picture	Best Direction
**Family Matters**; Katips; Mahal Kita, Beksman; Maid in Malacañang; Nanahimik ang Gabi	**Mikhail Red – Deleter**; Darryl Yap – Maid in Malacañang; Perci M. Intalan – Mahal Kita, Beksman; Shugo Praico – Nanahimik ang Gabi; Vince Tañada – Katips
Best Actor	Best Actress
**Noel Trinidad** – **Family Matters**; Cesar Montano – Maid in Malacañang; Christian Bables – Mahal Kita, Beksman; Jerome Ponce – Katips; Sid Lucero – Reroute	**Heaven Peralejo – Nanahimik ang Gabi**; Belle Mariano – An Inconvenient Love; Cindy Miranda – Reroute; Cristine Reyes – Maid in Malacañang; Liza Lorena – Family Matters
Best Supporting Actor	Best Supporting Actress
**John Arcilla – Reroute**; Keempee de Leon – Mahal Kita, Beksman; Mon Confiado – Nanahimik ang Gabi; Nonie Buencamino – Family Matters; Vince Tañada – Katips	**Mylene Dizon** – **Family Matters**; Agot Isidro – Family Matters; Beverly Salviejo – Maid in Malacañang; Elizabeth Oropesa – Maid in Malacañang; Lara Morena – Relyebo
Best Screenplay	Best Cinematography
**Leonor Will Never Die** – **Martika Ramirez Escobar**; An Inconvenient Love – Enrico C. Santos; Family Matters – Mel Mendoza-del Rosario; Maid in Malacañang – Darryl Yap; Mamasapano: Now It Can Be Told – Eric Ramos	**Leonor Will Never Die – Carlos Mauricio**; Blue Room – Neil Daza; Kun Maupay Man It Panahon – Larry Manda; Mamasapano: Now It Can Be Told – Paolo Emmanuel Magsino; Relyebo – Alex Espartero
Best Production Design	Best Editing
**Family Matters** **– Elfren Vibar**; Katips – Rolando Rubenecia; Mahal Kita, Beksman – Carmela Danao; Maid in Malacañang – Edgar Martin Littaua; Relyebo – John Ronald Vicencio	**Leonor Will Never Die** – **Lawrence Ang**; Blue Room – Vanessa de Leon; Mamasapano: Now It Can Be Told – Paolo Emmanuel Magsino & Benedict Sepagan; Relyebo – Chrisel Galeno-Desuasido; The Baseball Player – Zig Dulay
Best Musical Score	Best Sound
**Blue Room –** **Mikey Amistoso & Jazz Nicolas**; Family Matters – Cesar Francis Concio; Katips – Pipo Cifra & Vince Tañada; Mahal Kita, Beksman – Emerson Texon; Maid in Malacañang – Darryl Yap	**Nanahimik ang Gabi** **– Andrea Teresa T. Idioma**; 12 Weeks – Lamberto Casas Jr.; Family Matters – Aian Caro, Armand de Guzman & Russel Gabayeron; Relyebo – Alex Tomboc & Lamberto Casas Jr.; The Baseball Player – Alex Tomboc

=== Special awards ===
The following honorary awards were also awarded.

- **Fernando Poe Jr.** **Lifetime Achievement Award – Leo Martinez**
- **8th Golden Reel Awardee** – Senator Imee Marcos
- **Lamberto Avellana Memorial Award –** Conrado Baltazar
- **Manuel de Leon Achievement Award –** Ricky Lee
