= 27th Luna Awards =

2011 Philippine film awards ceremony

- Date: July 10, 2011
- Site: Quezon City Sports Club, Kristong Hari, Quezon City
- Hosted by: Boots Anson-Roa; Robert Arevalo

Highlights
- Best Picture: Baler
- Most awards: Baler (8)
- Most nominations: Baler (10)

The 27th Luna Awards were held on July 10, 2011 at the Quezon City Sports Club and they honored the best Filipino films of the year 2008. It was delayed due to lack of government funding and was held together with the 29th Luna Awards.

The nominations were released on September 16, 2009. Baler received the most nominations with ten. Caregiver followed with nine.

The winners were announced beforehand on March 25, 2011. Baler dominated the ceremony by winning eight awards, including Best Picture.

== Winners and nominees ==
Best Picture	Best Direction
Baler; A Very Special Love; Caregiver; Magkaibigan; Ploning; Torotot	Mark Meily – Baler; Cathy Garcia-Molina – A Very Special Love; Jose Javier Reyes – Magkaibigan; Maryo J. de los Reyes – Torotot; Chito Roño – Caregiver
Best Actor	Best Actress
Christopher de Leon – Magkaibigan; John Lloyd Cruz – A Very Special Love; John Estrada – Caregiver; Baron Geisler – Torotot; Aga Muhlach – When Love Begins; Jericho Rosales – Baler	Mylene Dizon – 100; Ai-Ai de las Alas – Ang Tanging Ina N'yong Lahat; Sharon Cuneta – Caregiver; Anne Curtis – Baler; Judy Ann Santos – Ploning
Best Supporting Actor	Best Supporting Actress
Phillip Salvador – Baler; Ricky Davao – Endo; Christopher de Leon – When Love Begins; Makisig Morales – Caregiver; Phillip Salvador – For the First Time; Dante Rivero – A Very Special Love; Ronaldo Valdez – When Love Begins	Iza Calzado – One True Love; Eugene Domingo – Ikaw Pa Rin: Bongga Ka Boy; Maricel Laxa – Magkaibigan; Candy Pangilinan – For the First Time; Tessie Tomas – 100
Best Screenplay	Best Cinematography
Roy Iglesias – Baler; Jade Castro, Michiko Yamamoto & Raymond Lee – Endo; Dante Nico Garcia & Benjamin Lingan – Ploning; Chris Martinez – Caregiver; Paul Alexander Morales – Concerto	Lee Meily – Baler; Eli Balce – Caregiver; Larry Manda – 100; Charlie Peralta – Ploning; Shayne Sarte – For the First Time
Best Production Design	Best Editing
Aped Santos – Baler; Nancy Arcega – A Very Special Love; Raymund George Fernandez – Ploning; Benjamin Padero & Carlo Tabije – Serbis; Gerry Santos – Concerto	Jess Navarro – Torotot; Manet Dayrit – Caregiver; Marya Ignacio – A Very Special Love; Marya Ignacio – My Only Ü; Ike Veneracion – 100
Best Musical Score	Best Sound
Vincent de Jesus – Baler; Carmina Cuya – Caregiver; Von de Guzman – Mag-ingat Ka Sa... Kulam; Vincent de Jesus – I.T.A.L.Y. (I Trust and Love You); Jesse Lasaten – Ploning	Ditoy Aguila – Baler; Ronald de Asis – Magkaibigan; Albert Michael Idioma – Ploning; Albert Michael Idioma – When Love Begins; Albert Michael Idioma & Addiss Tabong – One Night Only

== Multiple nominations and awards ==
Nominations	Film
10	Baler
9	Caregiver
7	Ploning
6	A Very Special Love
5	Magkaibigan
4	100
4	Torotot
4	When Love Begins
3	For the First Time
2	Concerto
2	Endo

Awards	Film
8	Baler
