= 29th Luna Awards =

2011 edition of Philippine film award ceremony

- Date: July 10, 2011
- Site: Quezon City Sports Club, Kristong Hari, Quezon City
- Hosted by: Boots Anson-Roa; Robert Arevalo

Highlights
- Best Picture: Emir
- Most awards: Rosario (5)
- Most nominations: Rosario (10)

The 29th Luna Awards were held on July 10, 2011, at the Quezon City Sports Club and they honored the best Filipino films of the year 2010. It was held together with the 27th Luna Awards.

The nominations were unveiled on June 3, 2011. Rosario received the most nominations with ten. It also dominated the Best Supporting Actor category by being able to secure 4 out of 5 nominations. Noy followed with eight.

Emir won the Best Picture and another 3 awards. Rosario earned the most awards with five.

== Winners and nominees ==
Best Picture	Best Direction
Emir; Noy; Rosario; Sa 'yo Lamang	Chito Roño – Emir; Joel Lamangan – Sagrada Familia; Gil Portes – Two Funerals; Dondon Santos – Noy
Best Actor	Best Actress
Dolphy – Father Jejemon; Christopher de Leon – Sa 'yo Lamang; Sid Lucero – Muli; Coco Martin – Noy; Fanny Serrano – Tarima	Lorna Tolentino – Sa 'yo Lamang; Ai-Ai de las Alas – Ang Tanging Ina Mo (Last na 'To!); Claudine Barretto – In Your Eyes; Jennylyn Mercado – Rosario; Judy Ann Santos – Hating Kapatid
Best Supporting Actor	Best Supporting Actress
Yul Servo – Rosario; Joem Bascon – Noy; Dolphy – Rosario; Sid Lucero – Rosario; Dennis Trillo – Rosario	Anne Curtis – In Your Eyes; Eugene Domingo – Ang Tanging Ina Mo (Last na 'To!); Cherry Pie Picache – Noy; Gloria Romero – Tarima
Best Screenplay	Best Cinematography
Elmer Gatchalian – Rosario; Jerry Gracio – Emir; Ricky Lee – Sa 'yo Lamang; Shugo Praico – Noy; Enrique Ramos – Two Funerals	Neil Daza & Lee Meily – Emir; Carlo Mendoza – Rosario; Jay Linao – You to Me Are Everything; Charlie Peralta – Babe, I Love You; Manuel Teehankee – Miss You like Crazy
Best Production Design	Best Editing
Joey Luna – Rosario; Cyrus Khan – Tarima; Benjamin Padero – Shake, Rattle & Roll 12: Punerarya; Digo Ricio – Emir	Jerrold Tarog – Emir; Renewin Alano – Dalaw; Renewin Alano – Noy; Marya Ignacio – Ang Tanging Ina Mo (Last na 'To!); Efren Jarlego – Sa 'yo Lamang
Best Musical Score	Best Sound
Albert Chang – Rosario; Von de Guzman – In Your Eyes; Jessie Lasaten – Miss You like Crazy	Connie Valdriz, Sandy Aguinaldo, Lynnel de Mesa & Ronald de Asis – RPG Metanoia; Nolet Clemente – The Red Shoes (A Love Story); Ross Diaz – Noy; Addiss Tabong & Albert Michael Idioma – Si Agimat at si Enteng Kabisote

=== Special awards ===
Golden Reel Award	Fernando Poe, Jr. Lifetime Achievement Award
Imelda Romualdez-Marcos	Armida Siguion-Reyna
Manuel de Leon Award for Exemplary Achievements	Lamberto Avellana Memorial Award
Romy Vitug	Chiquito; Paquito Diaz

== Multiple nominations and awards ==
Nominations	Film
10	Rosario
8	Noy
6	Emir
6	Sa 'yo Lamang
3	Ang Tanging Ina Mo (Last na 'To!)
3	In Your Eyes
3	Tarima
2	Miss You like Crazy
2	Two Funerals

Awards	Film
5	Rosario
4	Emir
