= 23rd Luna Awards =

2005 Philippine film awards ceremony

- Date: May 14, 2005
- Site: Harbor Garden Tent, The Westin Philippine Plaza, CCP Complex, Pasay
- Hosted by: Cherie Gil; Martin Nievera

Highlights
- Best Picture: Aishite Imasu 1941: Mahal Kita
- Most awards: Aishite Imasu 1941: Mahal Kita (6)
- Most nominations: Santa Santita (9)

Television coverage
- Network: RPN

The 23rd Luna Awards were held on May 14, 2005, at The Westin Philippine Plaza and they honored the best Filipino films of the year 2004. This is the first time that "Luna" was used as the name of the awards. The new voting process was also fully implemented.

The nominees were announced on April 14, 2005. Santa Santita received the most nominations with nine. It was followed by Aishite Imasu 1941: Mahal Kita, Milan and Panaghoy sa Suba with eight.

Aishite Imasu 1941: Mahal Kita gained most of the awards with six awards, including the Best Picture. Dennis Trillo was originally placed in the Best Supporting Actor category but it was moved to the Best Actor, just like what Star Awards for Movies did. The Director General's Ball was held in the Grand Plaza Ballroom right after the awards ceremony.

The awards ceremony was criticized for number of reasons. It was criticized for starting late from its original schedule and the loot bags were only given to the winners of the major categories, ignoring the winners of the technical categories. Before the last three segments of the ceremony, the audience were instructed to go outside to see the fireworks display. This led to an almost-empty venue when Regine Velasquez sang and Joel Lamangan and Lily Monteverde gave their acceptance speeches, after winning Best Director and Best Picture, respectively. Despite being an industry affair, some movie workers were denied entry to the ceremony. This also occurred to some of the press people.

== Winners and nominees ==
Best Picture	Best Direction
Aishite Imasu 1941: Mahal Kita; Milan; Naglalayag; Panaghoy sa Suba; Santa Santita	Joel Lamangan – Aishite Imasu 1941: Mahal Kita; Laurice Guillen – Santa Santita; Olivia Lamasan – Milan; Erik Matti – Pa-siyam; Cesar Montano – Panaghoy sa Suba
Best Actor	Best Actress
Dennis Trillo – Aishite Imasu 1941: Mahal Kita; Christopher de Leon – Mano Po III: My Love; Piolo Pascual – Milan; Jericho Rosales – Santa Santita; Yul Servo – Naglalayag	Claudine Barretto – Milan; Nora Aunor – Naglalayag; Judy Ann Santos – Sabel; Vilma Santos – Mano Po III: My Love; Maricel Soriano – I Will Survive
Best Supporting Actor	Best Supporting Actress
Jay Manalo – Aishite Imasu 1941: Mahal Kita; Johnny Delgado – Santa Santita; Ryan Eigenmann – Milan; Eddie Garcia – Mano Po III: My Love; Ronnie Lazaro – Panaghoy sa Suba	Jaclyn Jose – Naglalayag; Amy Austria – Beautiful Life; Hilda Koronel – Santa Santita; Daria Ramirez – Panaghoy sa Suba; Gloria Romero – Beautiful Life
Best Screenplay	Best Cinematography
Cris Vertido – Panaghoy sa Suba; Irma Dimaranan – Naglalayag; Johnny Gracio, Michiko Yamamoto & Johnny Delgado – Santa Santita; Roy Iglesias – Mano Po III: My Love; Ricky Lee – Sabel	Ely Cruz – Panaghoy sa Suba; Shayne Clemente – Milan; Yam Laranas – Sigaw; Lee Meily – Santa Santita
Best Production Design	Best Editing
Joey Luna – Aishite Imasu 1941: Mahal Kita; Raymond Bajarias – Feng Shui; Edgar Martin Littaua – Santa Santita; Nuel Naval – Milan	Marya Ignacio – Aishite Imasu 1941: Mahal Kita; Vito Cajili – Feng Shui; Vito Cajili – Spirit of the Glass; Manet Dayrit – Sigaw; Marya Ignacio – Milan
Best Musical Score	Best Sound
Nonong Buencamino – Panaghoy sa Suba; Carmina Cuya – Feng Shui; Von de Guzman – Aishite Imasu 1941: Mahal Kita; Vincent de Jesus – Santa Santita; Lutgardo Labad – Naglalayag	Albert Michael Idioma – Feng Shui; Nestor Mutia & Angie Reyes – Naglalayag; Angie Reyes & Nestor Mutia – Panaghoy sa Suba; Ramon Reyes – Aishite Imasu 1941: Mahal Kita; Ramon Reyes & Angie Reyes – Kulimlim

=== Special award ===
Fernando Poe, Jr. Lifetime Achievement Award
- Marichu Vera-Perez Maceda

=== Cyber Choice Awards ===
The Cyber Choice Awards were also given with the winners getting certificates. It also used the new voting process. The winners of these awards are not considered as part of the official results.

Best Picture	Best Direction
Naglalayag	Cesar Montano – Panaghoy sa Suba
Best Actor	Best Actress
Yul Servo – Naglalayag	Nora Aunor – Naglalayag
Best Supporting Actor	Best Supporting Actress
Jay Manalo – Aishite Imasu 1941: Mahal Kita	Jaclyn Jose – Naglalayag

== Multiple nominations and awards ==
Nominations	Film
9	Santa Santita
8	Aishite Imasu 1941: Mahal Kita
8	Milan
8	Panaghoy sa Suba
7	Naglalayag
4	Feng Shui
4	Mano Po III: My Love
2	Beautiful Life
2	Sabel
2	Sigaw

Awards	Film
6	Aishite Imasu 1941: Mahal Kita
3	Panaghoy sa Suba
