= 25th Luna Awards =

Filipino film awards ceremony for films from 2006

- Date: December 27, 2007
- Site: Club Filipino, Greenhills, San Juan
- Hosted by: Gina Alajar; Rez Cortez

Highlights
- Best Picture: Kasal, Kasali, Kasalo
- Most awards: Kasal, Kasali, Kasalo (6)
- Most nominations: Kasal, Kasali, Kasalo (8)

The 25th Luna Awards were held on December 27, 2007 at Club Filipino and they honored the best Filipino films of the year 2006. It was delayed due to lack of government funding.

The nominees were announced on November 29, 2007. Kasal, Kasali, Kasalo received the most nominations with eight. Inang Yaya followed with six.

The winners were announced before the awards night. Kasal, Kasali, Kasalo gained most of the awards with six awards, including Best Picture.

== Winners and nominees ==
Best Picture	Best Direction
Kasal, Kasali, Kasalo; Inang Yaya; Kaleldo; Kubrador; Sukob	Jose Javier Reyes – Kasal, Kasali, Kasalo; Joyce Bernal – Don't Give Up on Us; Jeffrey Jeturian – Kubrador; Brillante Mendoza – Kaleldo; Chito Roño – Sukob
Best Actor	Best Actress
John Lloyd Cruz – All About Love; Robert Arevalo – Barcelona; Eddie Garcia – I Wanna Be Happy; Sid Lucero – Donsol; Rustom Padilla – ZsaZsa Zaturnnah Ze Moveeh	Judy Ann Santos – Kasal, Kasali, Kasalo; Gina Pareño – Kubrador; Judy Ann Santos – Don't Give Up on Us; Maricel Soriano – Inang Yaya
Best Supporting Actor	Best Supporting Actress
Johnny Delgado – Ligalig; Tommy Abuel – Don't Give Up on Us; Archie Adamos – Raket ni Nanay; Eddie Garcia – Till I Met You; Ronaldo Valdez – Sukob	Gina Pareño – Kasal, Kasali, Kasalo; Cherry Pie Picache – I Wanna Be Happy; Celia Rodriguez – Ligalig; Tala Santos – Inang Yaya
Best Screenplay	Best Cinematography
Jose Javier Reyes & Mary Ann Bautista – Kasal, Kasali, Kasalo; Adolfo Alix, Jr. – Donsol; Ralston Jover – Kubrador; Boots Agbayani Pastor – Kaleldo; Veronica Velasco – Inang Yaya	Jay Linao – Eternity; Marissa Floirendo – TxT; Nap Jamir – Twilight Dancers; Lito Mempin – Barang; Ramoncito Redoble – Kasal, Kasali, Kasalo
Best Production Design	Best Editing
Chito Sumera – Eternity; Edgar Martin Littaua – ZsaZsa Zaturnnah Ze Moveeh; Benjamin Padero – Kaleldo; Norman Regalado – Inang Yaya	Vito Cajili – Kasal, Kasali, Kasalo; Manet Dayrit – Sukob; Jay Halili – Pamahiin; Marya Ignacio – You Are the One
Best Musical Score	Best Sound
Vincent de Jesus – ZsaZsa Zaturnnah Ze Moveeh; Nonong Buencamino – Inang Yaya; Nonong Buencamino – Moments of Love; Von de Guzman – Shake, Rattle and Roll 8; Jesse Lucas – I Will Always Love You	Angie Reyes – Till I Met You; Ditoy Aguila – Eternity; Albert Michael Idioma – Kasal, Kasali, Kasalo; Addiss Tabong – Close to You; Addiss Tabong – First Day High

=== Special awards ===
Fernando Poe, Jr. Lifetime Achievement Award	Manuel de Leon Award for Exemplary Achievements
Celso Ad. Castillo; Rudy Fernandez	Charo Santos-Concio; Wilson Tieng
Lamberto Avellana Memorial Award
Manuel Conde; Vic Silayan

== Multiple nominations and awards ==
Nominations	Film
8	Kasal, Kasali, Kasalo
6	Inang Yaya
4	Kaleldo
4	Kubrador
4	Sukob
3	Don't Give Up on Us
3	Eternity
3	ZsaZsa Zaturnnah Ze Moveeh
2	Donsol
2	I Wanna Be Happy
2	Ligalig
2	Till I Met You

Awards	Film
6	Kasal, Kasali, Kasalo
2	Eternity
