= Bagong Buwan =

2001 film by Marilou Diaz-Abaya

- Official movie poster
- Directed by: Marilou Diaz-Abaya
- Written by: Marilou Diaz-Abaya; Ricardo Lee; Jun Lana
- Produced by: Marilou Diaz-Abaya; Niña Romualdez
- Starring: Cesar Montano; Jericho Rosales; Caridad Sanchez; Amy Austria; Nonie Buencamino; Ronnie Lazaro; Carlo Aquino; Jhong Hilario; Jiro Manio; Jodi Sta. Maria
- Cinematography: Eduardo "Totoy" Jacinto
- Edited by: Jesus Navarro
- Music by: Nonong Buencamino
- Production companies: Star Cinema; Bahaghari Productions
- Distributed by: Star Cinema; 20th Century Fox (International)
- Release date: December 25, 2001
- Running time: 136 minutes
- Country: Philippines
- Language: Filipino

Bagong Buwan (lit. '"New Moon"') is a 2001 Filipino drama film co-produced and directed by Marilou Diaz-Abaya from a story and screenplay she co-wrote with Ricky Lee and Jun Lana. It is about the Muslim rebellion in Mindanao, Philippines and its effect on civilians. It has become one of the director's cinematic masterpieces due to making awareness and highlights of a socio-political issue to the cinematic audience.

A co-production of Star Cinema and Bahaghari Productions, the film was theatrically released on December 25, 2001, as an official entry of the 27th Metro Manila Film Festival and won seven awards including Second Best Picture, Best Actor (Montano), Best Child Performer (Manio), and Best Original Theme Song (Joey Ayala's "Walang Hanggang Paalam").

It received an international release in the United States on July 19, 2002, as part of the New York Asian American International Film Festival and in Japan on September 15, 2002, as part of the 12th Fukuoka International Film Festival. The film was restored in high definition by ABS-CBN Film Archives and Central Digital Lab in 2015.

== Plot ==
Ahmad, a Moro doctor based in Manila, returns to his native Mindanao after being informed that his only son, Ibrahim, was killed by a stray bullet filed by vigilantes on their village. He reunites with his wife, Fatima, and his mother, Farida. Ahmad is in disagreement with his brother, Musa, an MILF commander seeking to achieve the independence of the Bangsamoro from the Philippines who trains his young son, Rashid to support their cause. Ahmad fails to convince his family to flee to Manila to escape the conflict in Mindanao. Farida is reluctant to be displaced further, while Fatima wishes to stay where the memory of his son remains. When fighting breaks out again, Ahmad and his family seek refuge in the house of a clan leader, Datu Ali.

Musa, together with Rashid, bombs a police station near a marketplace. Francis, a young Catholic boy, is separated from his parents during the confusion and follows Rashid. Rashid grudgingly takes Francis with him and introduces him to his co-villagers at Datu Ali's house. Francis goes wherever Ahmad and his people go. Francis and Rashid, at their very young age, find themselves prejudiced against each other. One day, a squad of government soldiers commanded by Lt. Ricarte, visit Datu Ali and offer to take the refugees to a safer place. Their convoy is subsequently ambushed by bandits, prompting Ahmad, Francis and other survivors to fall back to Datu Ali's place. Datu Ali realizes that his residence is no longer safe and instructs the refugees to flee. He is later slain in an attack by the same bandits.

Ahmad becomes the leader of the refugee group, defending them from marauding bandits and treating sick companions. However, he is unable to save Farida, who dies of exhaustion, and Dolor, a Catholic who married a Muslim and dies due to childbirth complications. Her infant son, whom she names Ibrahim in honor of Ahmad's son, is taken in by Fatima. Francis and Rashid continue to bicker but are eventually pacified by Jason, a former sacristan who joined Ahmad's group as a peace worker after witnessing the murder of his uncle, a priest.

Ahmad meets up in the jungle with Musa, but are caught up in a crossfire with Ricarte's forces. Ricarte is subsequently captured but is spared by Musa following an appeal by Ahmad, whom he had befriended prior to the ambush. As Ahmad treats Ricarte, the army attacks Musa's position. Ahmad is mortally wounded while shielding Francis from the crossfire, prompting Ricarte to order a ceasefire. The next morning, following Ahmad's funeral, Rashid reconciles with Francis before joining his father in the mountains. Fatima and Jason return Francis to his parents before going to a refugee camp to teach displaced children.

== Cast ==
- Cesar Montano as Dr. Ahmad Ibn Ismael
- Jericho Rosales as Lt. Ricarte
- Amy Austria as Fatima
- Caridad Sanchez as Bae Farida
- Carlo Aquino as Rashid
- Noni Buencamino as Musa
- Jiro Manio as Francis delos Santos
- Ronnie Lazaro as Datu Ali
- Jhong Hilario as Jason
- Jodi Santamaria as Dolor

== Production ==
After finishing Muro-Ami in 1999, director Marilou Diaz-Abaya started working on the subject of the struggles of Filipino Muslims and the long-time conflict between Christians and Muslims in Mindanao in January 2000, two months before the all-out war against the Moro Islamic Liberation Front. She developed the screenplay with screenwriters Ricky Lee and Jun Lana after gathering research and immersions about the topics through libraries and madrasahs and communications with the Muslim communities in the National Capital Region and Mindanao.

The film was shot in Malaybalay, Bukidnon, Marawi, Nagcarlan, Laguna and Metro Manila.

== Reception ==
=== Accolades ===
Award-giving organization	Date of ceremony	Category	Recipient(s)	Result	Ref.
27th Metro Manila Film Festival	December 27, 2001	Best Picture	Bagong Buwan	2nd	
27th Metro Manila Film Festival	December 27, 2001	Best Actor	Cesar Montano	Won	
27th Metro Manila Film Festival	December 27, 2001	Best Supporting Actor	Ronnie Lazaro	Won	
27th Metro Manila Film Festival	December 27, 2001	Best Child Performer	Jiro Manio	Won	
27th Metro Manila Film Festival	December 27, 2001	Best Original Theme Song	"Walang Hanggang Paalam" by Joey Ayala	Won	
27th Metro Manila Film Festival	December 27, 2001	Best Musical Score	Nonong Buencamino	Won	
27th Metro Manila Film Festival	December 27, 2001	Gatpuno Antonio J. Villegas Cultural Awards	Bagong Buwan	Won	
Catholic Mass Media Awards	2002	Film of the Year	Bagong Buwan	Won	
Gawad Urian Awards	2002	Best Actor	Cesar Montano	Nominated	

== See also ==
- Legal Wives - First Philippine television drama series that tackles the culture of Filipino Muslims and polygamic marriages
