= 19th Luna Awards =

2001 Philippine film awards ceremony

- Date: May 5, 2001
- Produced by: Film Academy of the Philippines

Highlights
- Best Picture: Tanging Yaman
- Most awards: Tanging Yaman (4); Deathrow (4)

The 19th Luna Awards (formerly FAP Awards) ceremony, presented by the Film Academy of the Philippines (FAP), took place on May 5, 2001, at the Fiesta Pavilion of Manila Hotel. During the gala, the FAP presented the Luna Awards in 13 competitive categories honoring films released in 2000. The ceremony was hosted by Cherie Gil, Judy Ann Santos, Marvin Agustin, and Rustom Padilla. Tanging Yaman and Deathrow were the most awarded films of the ceremony, each winning four awards.

== Winners and nominees ==
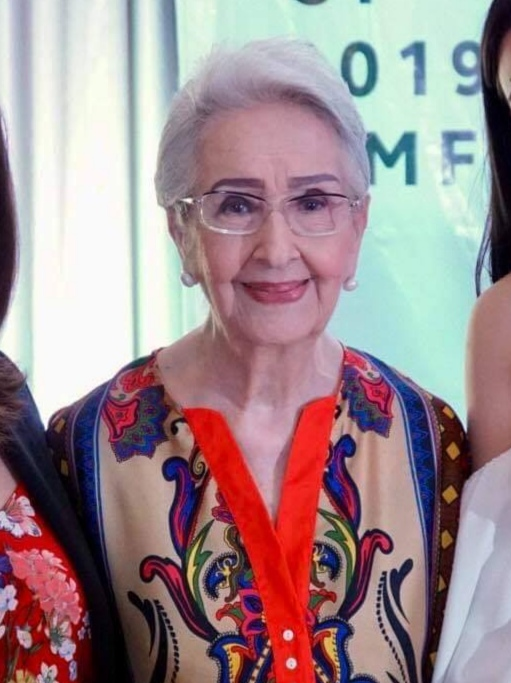
Gloria Romero, Best Actress winner

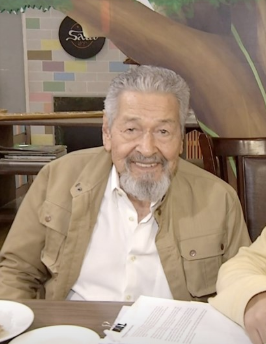
Eddie Garcia, Best Actor winner

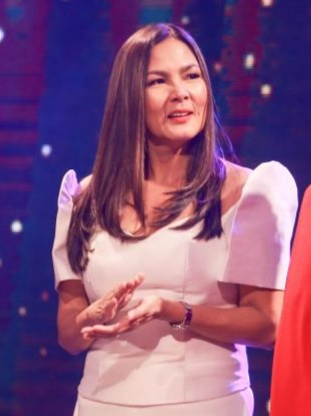
Amy Austria, Best Supporting Actress winner

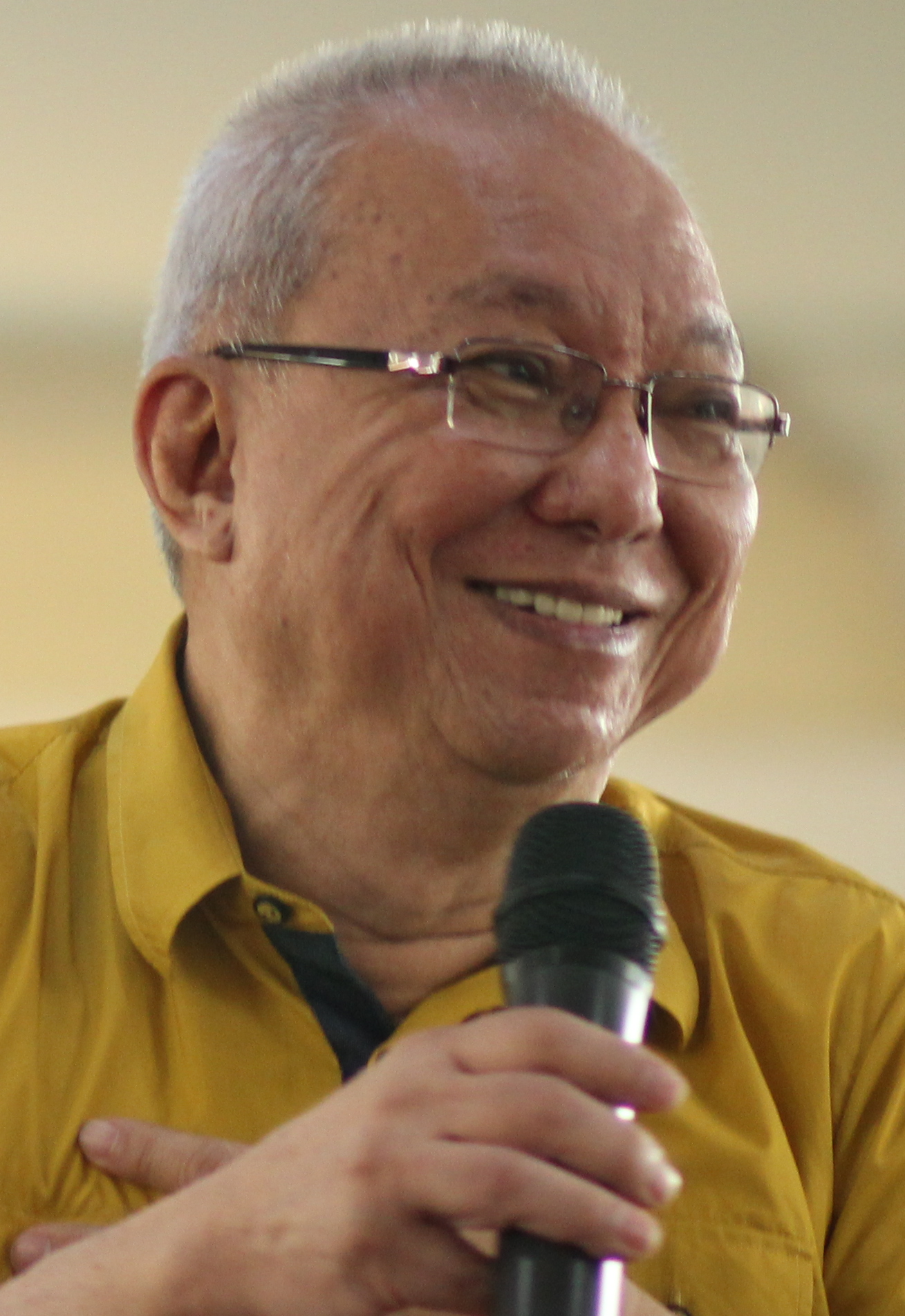
Ricky Lee, Best Screenplay winner

=== Awards ===
Winners are listed first, highlighted in boldface.

Best Picture	Best Direction
**Tanging Yaman**; Abandonada; Anak; Bayaning Third World; Deathrow	**Laurice Guillen –** **Tanging Yaman**; Joey Reyes – Bukas Nalang Kita Mamahalin; Joel Lamangan – Deathrow; Olive Lamasan – Minsan Minahal Kita; Rory Quintos – Anak
Best Actor	Best Actress
**Eddie Garcia – Deathrow**; Johnny Delgado – Tanging Yaman; Rudy Fernandez –Palaban; Edu Manzano – Tanging Yaman; Dante Rivero – Azucena	**Gloria Romero –** **Tanging Yaman**; Vilma Santos – Anak; Maricel Soriano – Abandonada; Lorna Tolentino – Sugatang Puso; Angelu de Leon – Bukas Nalang Kita Mamahalin
Best Supporting Actor	Best Supporting Actress
**Pen Medina – Deathrow**; Jericho Rosales – Tanging Yaman; Patrick Garcia – Sugatang Puso; Bojo Molina – Gusto Ko ng Lumigaya; Roi Vinzon – Palaban	**Amy Austria – Anak**; Cherie Gil – Sugatang Puso; Angelu de Leon – Abandonada; Cherry Pie Picache – Anak; Daria Ramirez – Bayaning Third World
Best Screenplay	Best Cinematographer
**Anak – Ricky Lee**; Gusto Ko ng Lumigaya – Lualhati Bautista; Tanging Yaman – Laurice Guillen, Raymond Lee, & Shaira Salvador; Minsan Minahal Kita – Olive Lamasan; Sugatang Puso – Jose Reyes	**Azucena – Romulo Araojo**; Anak – Joe Batac; Minsan Minahal Kita – Shayne Clemente; Ping Lacson Story – Ramon Marcelino; Abandonada – Charlie Peralta
Best Production Designer	Best Editor
**Deathrow – Joey Luna**; Tanging Yaman – Edgar Litaua; Anak – Noel Naval	**Deathrow – Jess Navarro**; Ika-13 Katipulo – Joyce Bernal; Gusto Ko ng Lumigaya – Danny Gloria; Tanging Yaman – George Arlejo; Anak – George Arlejo; Bayaning Third World – Armando Jarlego; Deathrow – Jesus Navarro
Best Sound Engineer	Best Song
**Tanging Yaman – Ramos Reyes**; Spirit Warrior – Albert Idioma; Deathrow - Albert Idioma; Lagarista - Albert Idioma; Ika-13 Katipulo - Ramon Reyes	**Abandonada - Vehnee Saturno**
Best Documentary
**Marsh Land – Nonoy Regalado**; Dream Weavers (Second Prize); Dystonia (3rd Prize)

=== Honorary and special awards ===
Recipient(s)	Award(s)
Chuchi	Lifetime Achievement Award
Dely Atay-Atayan	Lifetime Achievement Award
Zsa Zsa Padilla	Lux Super Rich Star of the Night
Cherie Gil	Extraderm Face of the Night

== Ceremony information ==
=== Presenters and performers ===
The ceremony was hosted by Cherie Gil, Judy Ann Santos, Marvin Agustin, and Rustom Padilla. The Philippine national anthem was performed by Cris Villonco while Zsa Zsa Padilla sang "Buhay Artista", the official theme song of the awards ceremony. Other performers include Jolina Magdangal and Gary Valenciano. The awards ceremony concluded with a tribute singing the theme "Handog", led by Eddie Mesa, Cherie Gil, Mark Gil at Ryan Eigenmann.

=== Controversy ===
In February 2001, Nestor Torre Jr. of Philippine Daily Inquirer commented on the withdrawal of the Directors Guild of the Philippines Inc. (DGIP) from Film Academy of the Philippines, two weeks after People Power II. Torre opined that "DGIP's withdrawal from the ranks" is a major loss and "will reflect on the academy's annual film awards."
