= Noon at Ngayon: Pagsasamang Kay Ganda =

- Promotional poster
- Directed by: Marilou Diaz-Abaya
- Written by: Ricardo Lee
- Based on: Moral (1982) by Marilou Diaz-Abaya
- Produced by: Charo Santos-Concio; Malou N. Santos
- Starring: Dina Bonnevie; Cherry Pie Picache; Jean Garcia; Eula Valdez; Laurice Guillen; Jericho Rosales; Marvin Agustin; Patrick Garcia
- Cinematography: Eduardo "Totoy" Jacinto
- Edited by: Tara Illenberger
- Music by: Nonong Buencamino
- Distributed by: Star Cinema
- Release date: August 13, 2003
- Running time: 126 minutes
- Country: Philippines
- Language: Filipino

Noon at Ngayon: Pagsasamang Kay Ganda (lit. 'Then and Now: A Beautiful Relationship') is a 2003 Filipino drama film directed by Marilou Diaz-Abaya and written by Ricky Lee. Noon At Ngayon tells the story of four friends who reunite after many years of separation. The film examines how dreams are shattered and changed through the years because of life's troubles and how these people reconciled with their pasts to lead better lives in the present. The film is a sequel to Diaz-Abaya's 1982 film, Moral and was released on August 13, 2003, under Star Cinema.

== Plot ==
Joey (Dina Bonnevie) comes home after nearly a decade of living in the States. With Joey back, the four friends find themselves complete again — they reminisce on the good old times, marvel at the changes in each other's lives. Indeed, a lot of things may have changed through the years, but some things remain constant. The ever-effervescent Kathy (Jean Garcia) gives up on her girlhood dream of becoming a singer—something which her sparklingly vivacious teenage daughter, Bernadette (Aiza Marquez), seems to have inherited. Sylvia (Eula Valdez) brings up her son, Bobby (Marvin Agustin), in ways that are more liberal, than most, ironically recoils at her grown son's only flaw: his infertility. Maritess (Cherry Pie Picache), a widow, contends with the complexities of being a mother to independent, self-asserting young adults: Guia (Jodi Sta. Maria), who chooses to remain single despite her pregnancy; Bryan (Paolo Contis), who's gay and proud of it; and Levi (Jericho Rosales), whose floater's ways hint at a yearning for something beyond what his present life can offer. Joey's stay in the States changes her a great deal; the untamed child of twenty years ago has matured into a woman who has come to embrace humanity and life. But pain and death may be realities that Joey has yet to learn to accept---because of her mother Maggie (Laurice Guillen), who is fighting a losing battle with cancer, and the main reason why she has come home. Bernadette persistently courts Bryan despite his openly gay orientation, only to have her heart broken by the futility of her feelings. Guia staunchly refuses to get back together with the father of her child in her desire to assert her self-sufficiency, but later realizes that needing people is not necessarily a sign of weakness. Bobby and his wife, Miriam (Dimples Romana), are torn between religion and science as they try to find a solution to their childlessness, while Levi finds love in the personification of Joey — the woman who loves the father he never got to know. As the four women try to reconcile past with present to cope with the changing times, the children come to terms with themselves, with the people they love, and with life on the whole.

== Cast ==
- Dina Bonnevie as Joey
- Jean Garcia as Kathy
- Cherry Pie Picache as Maritess
- Eula Valdez as Sylvia
- Jericho Rosales as Levi
- Marvin Agustin as Bobby
- Paolo Contis as Bryan
- Jodi Sta. Maria as Guia
- Dimples Romana as Miriam
- Laurice Guillen as Maggie
- Nonie Buencamino as Robert
- Lito Pimentel as Celso
- Aiza Marquez as Bernadette
- Patrick Garcia as Mike
- Lorenzo Mara

== Production ==
Lorna Tolentino was supposed to reprise her role as Joey for the sequel, however, due to disagreements over talent fee she instead went on to do Mano Po 2: My Home. The role of Joey went to Dina Bonnevie, who was originally set to star alongside Tolentino in Mano Po 2 but had left the production after the role originally meant for her was taken over by the latter.

Laurice Guillen and Lito Pimentel are the only members of the cast to reprise their roles from Moral.

In addition, Valdez and Garcia were both reunited since Pangako Sa 'Yo which ended in the 3rd quarter of 2002. Patrick Garcia and Jodi Sta. Maria were also from the said primetime series but they also both reunited since Jologs and later remained in Darating ang Umaga alongside Valdez. Bonnevie and Picache were from Tanging Yaman (released in December 2000) together with Jericho Rosales and Marvin Agustin (remained from Sana'y Wala Nang Wakas with her loveteam Kristine Hermosa, premiering in May). On the other hand, Jean Garcia also remains in Kay Tagal Kang Hinintay, where she played the female antagonist of the series Lady Morgana Frost-Arcangel .

== Songs ==
- "Can We Just Stop and Talk Awhile" - Jose Mari Chan
- "Noon at Ngayon" - Carol Banawa

== Awards ==
Year	Award-Giving Body	Category	Recipient	Result
2004	FAMAS Awards	Best Supporting Actor	Paolo Contis	Nominated
2004	FAMAS Awards	Best Supporting Actress	Aiza Marquez	Nominated
2004	FAMAS Awards	Best Director	Marilou Diaz-Abaya	Nominated
2004	Gawad Urian Awards	Best Supporting Actor (Pinakamahusay na Pangalawang Aktor)	Jericho Rosales	Nominated
