= Family Matters (2022 film) =

- Theatrical release poster
- Directed by: Nuel Crisostomo Naval
- Written by: Mel Mendoza-del Rosario
- Produced by: James Blanco
- Starring: Noel Trinidad; Liza Lorena; Nonie Buencamino; Agot Isidro; Mylene Dizon; Nikki Valdez; James Blanco; JC Santos
- Cinematography: Noel Teehankee
- Edited by: Beng Bandong
- Music by: Cesar Francis Concio
- Production companies: Cineko Productions; Top Story
- Distributed by: Axinite Digicinema Inc.
- Release date: December 25, 2022 (Manila)
- Running time: 134 minutes
- Country: Philippines
- Language: Filipino
- Box office: ₱58 million

Family Matters is a 2022 Philippine drama film directed by Nuel C. Naval from a screenplay written by Mel Mendoza-del Rosario. The film stars Noel Trinidad, Liza Lorena, Nonie Buencamino, Agot Isidro, Mylene Dizon, Nikki Valdez, James Blanco, and JC Santos.

Produced by Cineko Productions and Top Story, the film was released theatrically on December 25, 2022, as an entry to the 48th Metro Manila Film Festival.

== Premise ==
Family Matters revolves around the family of an elderly married couple consisting of Francisco (Noel Trinidad) and Eleanor (Liza Lorena), and their children: Kiko (Nonie Buencamino), Fortune (Mylene Dizon), Ellen (Nikki Valdez), and Enrico (JC Santos). Ellen flies for the United States in a bid to find a romantic partner, leaving the three other siblings to take care of their parents.

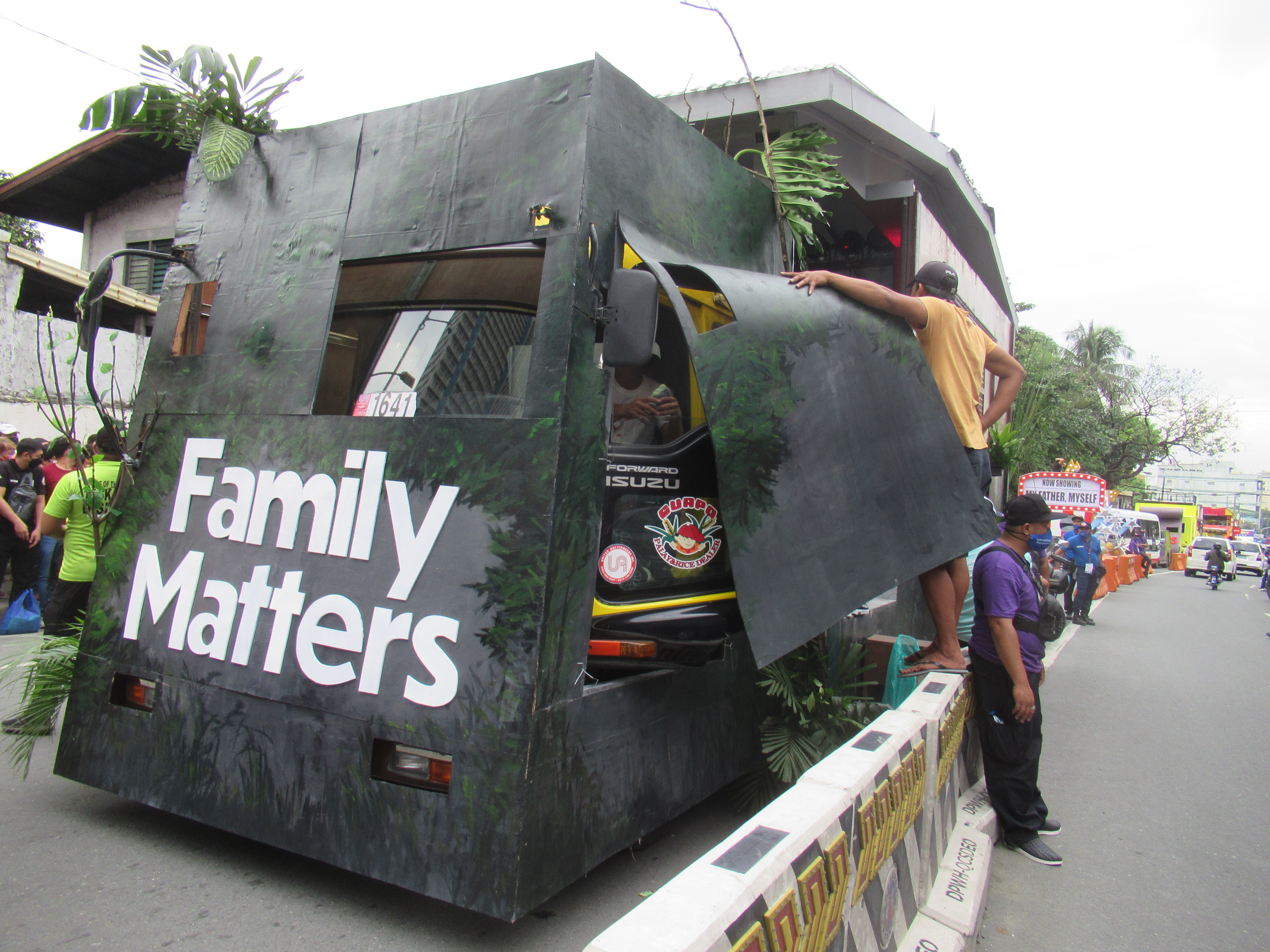
Float

== Cast ==
- Noel Trinidad as Francisco
  - Ketchup Eusebio as young Francisco
- Liza Lorena as Eleanor
  - Roxanne Guinoo-Yap as young Eleanor
- Nonie Buencamino as Kiko – Francisco and Eleanor’s eldest child
- Agot Isidro as Odette – Kiko's wife
- Mylene Dizon as Fortune – the second of Francisco and Eleanor's children
- Nikki Valdez as Ellen – the third of Francisco and Eleanor's children
- James Blanco as Nelson – Fortune's husband
- JC Santos as Enrico – the youngest child of Francisco and Eleanor
- Ian Pangilinan as Francis — eldest son of Kiko
- Anna Luna as Irene
- Ina Feleo as Glenda
- Beatriz Teves as Frances
- Alexa Macanan as Nikki
- Krystal Mejes as Nina
- Allyson McBride as Ginny
- Kzhoebe Nichole Baker as Ivy

Boots Anson-Roa was offered to portray the role of Eleanor but had to decline due to recovering from an illness and conflict of interest reasons for being part of the Metro Manila Film Festival Screening Committee.

== Production ==
Family Matters was produced under Cineko Productions and directed by Nuel Naval and written by Mel Mendoza-del Rosario. Prior to the COVID-19 pandemic, Cineko has expressed interest producing a film with Naval, who had not made a film with the studio outfit before. Naval had to deal with constraints caused by the pandemic for the film's production. He was given freedom to choose the members of the cast by the film's producer Enrico Roque. Naval has contrasted Tanging Yaman with Family Matters describing the former as tackling faith and family wealth while the latter just deals with contemporary everyday family affairs.

== Accolades ==
Award-giving body	Award	Recipient	Result
2022 Metro Manila Film Festival	Gatpuno Antonio J. Villegas Cultural Award		Won
71st Filipino Academy of Movie Arts and Sciences (FAMAS)	Best Picture		Won
	Best Actor	Noel Trinidad	Won
	Best Actress	Liza Lorena	Nominated
	Best Supporting Actor	Nonie Buencamino	Nominated
	Best Supporting Actress	Mylene Dizon	Nominated
	Best Supporting Actress	Nikki Valdez	Won
	Best Director	Nuel Crisostomo Naval	Nominated
	Best Screenplay	Mel Mendoza-del Rosario	Nominated
	Best Editing	Rosabelle Claricia “Beng” Bandong	Won
	Best Production Design	Elfren Vibar	Nominated
	Best Cinematography	Noel Teehankee	Nominated
	Best Musical Score	Cesar Francis Concio	Nominated
6th Edition of The Entertainment Editors Choice Awards (The Eddys)	Best Theme Song	"Sa Hawak Mo" by Paulo Zarate and Floyd Tena	Won
	Best Actor	Noel Trinidad	Nominated
	Best Supporting Actress	Mylene Dizon	Nominated
	Best Supporting Actress	Nikki Valdez	Won
	Best Screenplay	Mel Mendoza Del Rosario	Won
	Best Director	Nuel Crisostomo Naval	Won
	Best Film		Won
	Best Production Design	Elfren Palpan Vibar Jr.	Nominated
39th Luna Award by the Film Academy of the Philippines	Best Picture		Won
	Best Actor	Noel Trinidad	Won
	Best Actress	Liza Lorena	Nominated
	Best Supporting Actor	Nonie Buencamino	Nominated
	Best Supporting Actress	Mylene Dizon	Won
	Best Supporting Actress	Agot Isidro	Nominated
	Best Director	Nuel Crisostomo Naval	Nominated
	Best Screenplay	Mel Mendoza-del Rosario	Nominated
	Best Production Design	Elfren Palpan Vibar Jr.	Won
Gawad Urian Awards 2023	Best Actor	Noel Trinidad	Nominated
	Best Supporting Actress	Nikki Valdez	Nominated

== Reception ==
=== Box-office ===
Family Matters has reportedly earned ₱9 million on its first day nationwide.

== Release ==
Family Matters is premiered in cinemas in the Philippines on December 25, 2022 as one of the eight entries of the 2022 Metro Manila Film Festival. It was released in the United States on February 3, 2023.
