= 21st FAP Awards =

2003 Philippine film awards ceremony

- Date: March 29, 2003
- Site: University Theater (Villamor Hall), University of the Philippines Diliman, Quezon City

Highlights
- Best Picture: Lapu-Lapu
- Most awards: Lapu-Lapu (7)
- Most nominations: Diskarte (11)

Television coverage
- Network: RPN

The 21st FAP Awards were held on March 29, 2003, at the University of the Philippines Theater and they honored the best Filipino films of the year 2002.

The nominations was heavily criticized due to non-nomination of Mga Munting Tinig in the Best Picture despite being the official submission for the 75th Academy Awards.

Lapu-Lapu won most of the awards with seven awards, including the Best Picture. These results were heavily denounced because this film didn't even receive a single award in the 2002 Metro Manila Film Festival and in the other three major film awards: FAMAS Awards, Gawad Urian Awards and Star Awards. The pakikisama system was mostly blamed that these results occurred. This system happens when an academy member only votes for their friends and not on the basis of cinematic accomplishments and craftsmanship. This is one of the triggering factors on why the voting process was reformulated to provide credible results.

== Winners and nominees ==
Best Picture	Best Direction
Lapu-Lapu; Batas ng Lansangan; Dekada '70; Diskarte; Kailangan Kita	William Mayo – Lapu-Lapu; Joel Lamangan – Mano Po; Rory Quintos – Kailangan Kita; Ronwaldo Reyes – Batas ng Lansangan; Chito Roño – Dekada '70; Edgardo Vinarao – Diskarte
Best Actor	Best Actress
Lito Lapid – Lapu-Lapu; Christopher de Leon – Dekada '70; Rudy Fernandez – Diskarte; Fernando Poe Jr. – Batas ng Lansangan; Rico Yan – Got 2 Believe	Vilma Santos – Dekada '70; Claudine Barretto – Kailangan Kita; Sharon Cuneta – Magkapatid; Ara Mina – Mano Po; Maricel Soriano – Mano Po
Best Supporting Actor	Best Supporting Actress
Piolo Pascual – Dekada '70; Roy Alvarez – Diskarte; Tirso Cruz III – Diskarte; Joonee Gamboa – Diskarte; Dante Rivero – Lapu-Lapu; Roi Vinzon – Batas ng Lansangan	Cherry Pie Picache – American Adobo; Gina Alajar – Mano Po; Amy Austria – Mano Po; Maria Isabel Lopez – Lapu-Lapu; Boots Anson-Roa – Mano Po
Best Screenplay	Best Story
Jerry Tirazona – Lapu-Lapu; Lualhati Bautista – Dekada '70; Pablo Gomez & Manny Buising – Batas ng Lansangan; Gil Portes, Adolfo Alix, Jr. & Senedy Que – Mga Munting Tinig; Meek Roxas & Senen Dimaguila – Diskarte	Lualhati Bautista – Dekada '70; Manny Buising – Ang Alamat ng Lawin; Pablo Gomez & Manny Buising – Batas ng Lansangan; Gil Portes – Mga Munting Tinig; Meek Roxas & Senen Dimaguila – Diskarte
Best Cinematography	Best Production Design
Shayne Clemente – Kailangan Kita; Jun Dalawis – Lapu-Lapu; Eduardo Jacinto – 9 Mornings; Richard Padernal – Ang Agimat: Anting-anting ni Lolo; Jun Pereira – Diskarte	Manny Morfe – Dekada '70; Tatus Aldana – Mano Po; Noel Naval – Got 2 Believe; Fiel Zabat – American Adobo
Best Editing	Best Sound
Francis Vinarao – Diskarte; Marya Ignacio – Kailangan Kita; Tara Illenberger – Magkapatid; George Jarlego – Mga Munting Tinig; Augusto Salvador – Ang Agimat: Anting-anting ni Lolo	Danny Lorilla – Lapu-Lapu; Audio Media – Ang Agimat: Anting-anting ni Lolo; Albert Michael Idioma – 9 Mornings; Nestor Mutia – Diskarte; Arnold Reodica – Ang Alamat ng Lawin
Best Musical Score ^{[A]}	Best Original Song ^{[B]}
Blitz Padua – Lapu-Lapu	Coritha – "Mabuhay Ang Kalayaan" from Lapu-Lapu

Notes:

^[A] The complete list of nominations for the Best Musical Score is unknown.
^[B] Coritha was the lone nominee in the Best Original Song.

=== Special award ===
Lifetime Achievement Award	Special Recognition Award
Susan Roces	Rodolfo Velasco

== Multiple nominations and awards ==
Nominations	Film
11	Diskarte
10	Lapu-Lapu
8	Dekada '70
7	Mano Po
6	Batas ng Lansangan
5	Kailangan Kita
3	Ang Agimat: Anting-anting ni Lolo
3	Mga Munting Tinig
2	9 Mornings
2	American Adobo
2	Ang Alamat ng Lawin
2	Got 2 Believe
2	Magkapatid

Awards	Film
7	Lapu-Lapu
4	Dekada '70
