= Star Award for Movie Actress of the Year =

- Awarded for: Best Performance by an Actress in a Leading Role
- Country: Philippines
- Presented by: Philippine Movie Press Club
- First award: 1985
- Currently held by: Vilma Santos; Uninvited (2025)

The Star Award for Movie Actress of the Year is one of the PMPC Star Award for Movies recognizing the outstanding films in the Philippines every year. It has been presented by the Philippine Movie Press Club since 1985.

== Winners and nominees ==
The list may be incomplete such as some of the names of the nominees and the roles portrayed especially during the early years of PMPC Star Award For Movie.

In the lists below, the winner of the award for each year is shown first, followed by the other nominees.

Table key
‡	Indicates the winner

Year	Actor	Film	Role
1985 (1st)
1985 (1st)	Nora Aunor ‡	'Merika	Mila Cruz
1985 (1st)	Nora Aunor	Condemned	Yolly
1985 (1st)	Nora Aunor	Bulaklak sa City Jail	Angela
1985 (1st)	Vilma Santos	Adultery	Aida Macaraeg
1985 (1st)	Vilma Santos	Sister Stella L	Sister Stella Legaspi
1986 (2nd)
1986 (2nd)	Nida Blanca ‡	Miguelito, Ang Batang Rebelde	Auring
1986 (2nd)	Nora Aunor	Tinik sa Dibdib	Lorna
1986 (2nd)	Vilma Santos	Muling Buksan ang Puso	
1987 (3rd)
1987 (3rd)	Jaclyn Jose ‡	Private Show	Myrna
1987 (3rd)	Nora Aunor	I Love You Mama, I Love You Papa	Flora Villena
1987 (3rd)	Dina Bonnevie	Magdusa Ka	Christine
1987 (3rd)	Liza Lorena	Halimaw sa Banga	Margarita
1988 (4th)
1988 (4th)	Lorna Tolentino ‡	Maging Akin Ka Lamang	Rosita Monteverde
1988 (4th)	Vilma Santos	Saan Nagtatago Ang Pag-Ibig?	Estella
1988 (4th)	Sharon Cuneta	Pasan Ko Ang Daigdig	Lupe Velez
1988 (4th)	Anna Marie Gutierrez	Hubad na Pangarap	Nelia
1989 (5th)
1989 (5th)	Jaclyn Jose ‡	Itanong Mo Sa Buwan	Josie
1989 (5th)	Sharon Cuneta	Tatlong Mukha Ng Pag-ibig	
1990 (6th)
1990 (6th)	Vilma Santos ‡	Pahiram ng Isang Umaga	Juliet Espiritu
1990 (6th)	Nora Aunor	Bilangin ang mga Bituin sa Langit	Nolie/Maggie
1991 (7th)
1991 (7th)	Nora Aunor ‡	Andrea, Paano Ba ang Maging Isang Ina?	Andrea
1992 (8th)
1992 (8th)	Nora Aunor ‡	Ang Totoong Buhay ni Pacita M.	Pacita Macaspac
1993 (9th)
1993 (9th)	Lorna Tolentino ‡	Narito ang Puso Ko	Ellen
1994 (10th)
1994 (10th)	Vilma Santos ‡	Dahil Mahal Kita: The Dolzura Cortez Story	Dolzura Cortez
1995 (11th)
1995 (11th)	Maricel Soriano (tied)‡	Separada	Melissa
1995 (11th)	Dawn Zulueta (tied)‡	Buhay Ng Buhay Ko	
1996 (12th)
1996 (12th)	Nora Aunor‡	The Flor Contemplacion Story	Flor Contemplacion
1997 (13th)
1997 (13th)	Sharon Cuneta ‡	Madrasta	Mariel
1997 (13th)	Nora Aunor	Bakit May Kahapon Pa?	Karina Salvacion
1998 (14th)
1998 (14th)	Zsa Zsa Padilla ‡	Batang PX	Tessie
1998 (14th)	Nora Aunor	Babae	Bea
1999 (25th)
1999 (25th)	Vilma Santos (tied)‡	Bata, Bata, Paano Ka Ginawa?	Lea Bustamante
1999 (25th)	Nida Blanca (tied)‡	Sana Pag-Ibig Na	Linda Perez
2000 (16th)
2000 (16th)	Elizabeth Oropesa ‡	Bulaklak Ng Maynila	Azun
2000 (16th)	Nora Aunor	Sidhi	Ana
2001 (17th)
2001 (17th)	Vilma Santos ‡	Anak	Josie
2001 (17th)	Pops Fernandez	Gusto Ko Ng Lumigaya	Christine
2002 (18th)
2002 (18th)	Ina Raymundo ‡	Tuhog	Floring
2003 (19th)
2003 (19th)	Vilma Santos ‡	Dekada '70	Amanda
2003 (19th)	Claudine Barretto	Kailangan Kita	Lena Duran
2004 (20th)
2004 (20th)	Ai-Ai delas Alas‡	Ang Tanging Ina	Ina Montecillo
2004 (20th)	Maricel Soriano	Filipinas	Yolanda Filipinas
2004 (20th)	Sharon Cuneta	Crying Ladies	Stella Mate
2005 (21st)
2005 (21st)	Vilma Santos‡	Mano Po 3: My Love	Lilia
2005 (21st)	Kris Aquino	Feng Shui	Joy Ramirez
2005 (21st)	Claudine Barretto	Milan	Jenny
2005 (21st)	Judy Ann Santos	Aishite Imasu 1941: Mahal Kita	Inya
2006 (22nd)
2006 (22nd)	Claudine Barretto‡	Nasaan Ka Man	Pilar
2006 (22nd)	Jennylyn Mercado	Blue Moon	Young Cora
2006 (22nd)	Zsa Padilla	Ako Legal Wife	Chona Chong
2006 (22nd)	Cherry Pie Picache	Bikini Open	Susan Ferrer-Logarta
2006 (22nd)	Irma Adlawan	Mga Pusang Gala	Marta
2007 (23rd)
2007 (23rd)	Judy Ann Santos ‡	Kasal, Kasali, Kasalo	Angie
2007 (23rd)	Nora Aunor	Care Home	
2007 (23rd)	Andrea del Rosario	Rome and Juliet	
2007 (23rd)	Gina Pareño	Kubrador	
2007 (23rd)	Cherry Pie Picache	Kaledo	
2007 (23rd)	Maricel Soriano	Inang Yaya	
2008 (24th)
2008 (24th)	Ai-Ai delas Alas‡	Ang Cute ng Ina Mo	Georgia
2008 (24th)	Lorna Tolentino	Katas ng Saudi	
2008 (24th)	Bea Alonzo	One More Chance	
2008 (24th)	Cherry Pie Picache	Foster Child	
2008 (24th)	Judy Ann Santos	Sakal, Sakali, Saklolo	Angie
2008 (24th)	Maricel Soriano	A Love Story	
2009 (25th)
2009 (25th)	Sharon Cuneta‡	Caregiver	Sarah Gonzales
2009 (25th)	Anne Curtis	Baler	
2009 (25th)	Irma Adlawan	Hubad	
2009 (25th)	Mylene Dizon	100	
2009 (25th)	Gloria Romero	Fuchsia	
2009 (25th)	Judy Ann Santos	Kulam	
2009 (25th)	Jodi Sta Maria	Sisa	
2010 (26th)
2010 (26th)	Vilma Santos‡	In My Life	Shirley Templo
2010 (26th)	Angelica Panganiban	I Love You Goodbye	
2010 (26th)	Iza Calzado	Dukot	
2010 (26th)	Sharon Cuneta	Mano Po 6: My Mother	
2010 (26th)	Eugene Domingo	Kimmy Dora	
2011 (27th)
2011 (27th)	Ai-Ai delas Alas‡	Ang Tanging Ina Mo, Last Na ‘To	Ina Montecillo
2011 (27th)	Bea Alonzo	Sa'yo lamang	
2011 (27th)	Anne Curtis	In Your Eyes	
2011 (27th)	Angelica Panganiban	Here Comes The Bride	
2011 (27th)	Lovi Poe	Mayohan	
2011 (27th)	Lorna Tolentino	Sa ‘Yo Lamang	
2011 (27th)	Dawn Zulueta	Sigwa	
2012 (28th)
2012 (28th)	Angel Locsin‡	In The Name Of Love	Mercedes Fernandez
2012 (28th)	Ai-Ai delas Alas	Enteng Ng Ina Mo	Ina Montecillo
2012 (28th)	Anne Curtis	No Other Woman	Kara Zalderiaga
2012 (28th)	Eugene Domingo	Ang Babae Sa Septic Tank	
2012 (28th)	Lovi Poe	My Neighbor's Wife	
2012 (28th)	Maja Salvador	Thelma	Thelma
2012 (28th)	Judy Ann Santos	My Househusband	
2013 (29th)
2013 (29th)	Angel Locsin‡	One More Try	Grace
2013 (29th)	Gina Alajar	Mater Dolorosa	
2013 (29th)	Bea Alonzo	The Mistress	
2013 (29th)	Nora Aunor	Thy Womb	
2013 (29th)	Angelica Panganiban	One More Try	Jacqueline
2013 (29th)	Vilma Santos	The Healing	
2013 (29th)	Jodi Sta. Maria	Migrante	
2014 (30th)
2014 (30th)	KC Concepcion‡	Boy Golden: Shoot to Kill	Marta 'Marlady' de Guzman
2014 (30th)	Bea Alonzo	Four Sisters And A Wedding	
2014 (30th)	Angel Locsin	Four Sisters And A Wedding	
2014 (30th)	Nora Aunor	Ang Kuwento Ni Mabuti	
2014 (30th)	Rustica Carpio	Ano Ang Kulay Ng Mga Nakalimutang Pangarap?	
2014 (30th)	Vilma Santos	Ekstra	
2014 (30th)	Lorna Tolentino	Burgos	
2015 (31st)
2015 (31st)	Nora Aunor‡	Dementia	Mara Fabre
2015 (31st)	Anne Curtis	The Gifted	
2015 (31st)	Eugene Domingo	Barber's Tales	
2015 (31st)	Cherie Gil	Mana	
2015 (31st)	Toni Gonzaga	Starting Over Again	Ginny
2015 (31st)	Aiko Melendez	Asintado	
2015 (31st)	Jennylyn Mercado	English Only, Please	
2016 (32nd)
2016 (32nd)	Bea Alonzo‡	A Second Chance	Basha
2016 (32nd)	Dawn Zulueta	The Love Affair	
2016 (32nd)	Iza Calzado	Etiquette For Mistresses	
2016 (32nd)	LJ Reyes	Anino Sa Likod Ng Buwan	
2016 (32nd)	Meryll Soriano	Honor Thy Father	
2016 (32nd)	Nora Aunor	Taklub	
2016 (32nd)	Rhian Ramos	Silong	
2016 (32nd)	Sarah Geronimo	The Breakup Playlist	
2017 (33rd)
2017 (33rd)	Nora Aunor (tied)‡	Kabisera	Mercedes 'Mercy' de Dios
2017 (33rd)	Vilma Santos (tied)‡	Everything About Her	Vivian
2017 (33rd)	Kathryn Bernardo	Barcelona: A Love Untold	Mia Dela Torre
2017 (33rd)	Janice de Belen	Ringgo, The Dog Shooter	
2017 (33rd)	Lotlot de Leon	1st Sem	
2017 (33rd)	Jaclyn Jose	Ma' Rosa	
2017 (33rd)	Hasmine Killip	Pamilya Ordinaryo	
2017 (33rd)	Angel Locsin	Everything About Her	Jaica
2017 (33rd)	Charo Santos	Ang Babaeng Humayo	
2017 (33rd)	Judy Ann Santos	Kusina	
2018 (34th)
2018 (34th)	Iza Calzado‡	Bliss	Jane Ciego
2018 (34th)	Joanna Ampil	Ang Larawan	
2018 (34th)	Kim Chiu	The Ghost Bride	
2018 (34th)	Sharon Cuneta	Unexpectedly Yours	
2018 (34th)	Alessandra de Rossi	Kita Kita	Lea
2018 (34th)	Agot Isidro	Changing Partners	
2018 (34th)	Jennylyn Mercado	All Of You	
2018 (34th)	Bela Padilla	100 Tula Para Kay Stella	
2018 (34th)	Maja Salvador	I'm Drunk, I Love You	
2018 (34th)	Jodi Sta. Maria	Dear Other Self	
2019 (35th)
2019 (35th)	Kathryn Bernardo (tied)‡	The Hows of Us	Georgina 'George/Jo' Silva
2019 (35th)	Sarah Geronimo (tied)‡	Miss Granny	Audrey de Leon
2019 (35th)	Iza Calzado	Distance	
2019 (35th)	Anne Curtis	Buy Bust	
2019 (35th)	Glaiza de Castro	Liway	
2019 (35th)	Alessandra de Rossi	Through Night And Day	
2019 (35th)	Nadine Lustre	Never Not Love You	
2019 (35th)	Gina Pareño	Hintayan Ng Langit	
2019 (35th)	Gloria Romero	Rainbow's Sunset	
2019 (35th)	Judy Ann Santos	Ang Dalawang Mrs. Reyes	
2020 (36th)			
2020 (36th)	Sylvia Sanchez‡	Jesusa	Jesusa
2020 (36th)	Bea Alonzo	Unbreakable	
2020 (36th)	Kathryn Bernardo	Hello, Love, Goodbye	
2020 (36th)	Angie Ferro	Lola Igna	
2020 (36th)	Sarah Geronimo	Unforgettable	
2020 (36th)	Janine Gutierrez	Babae At Baril	
2020 (36th)	Ruby Ruiz	Iska	
2020 (36th)	Judy Ann Santos	Mindanao	
2020 (36th)	Jodi Sta. Maria	Clarita	
2021 (37th)
2021 (37th)	Alessandra de Rossi (tied)	Watch List	Maria
2021 (37th)	Sylvia Sanchez (tied)	Coming Home	Salve Librada
2021 (37th)	Nora Aunor	Isa Pang Bahaghari	
2021 (37th)	Iza Calzado	Tagpuan	
2021 (37th)	Charlie Dizon	Fan Girl	
2021 (37th)	Lovi Poe	Malaya	
2021 (37th)	Cristine Reyes	Untrue	
2022 (38th)
2022 (38th)	Sunshine Dizon (tied)	Versus	Norma
2022 (38th)	Charo Santos (tied)	Kun Maupay Man It Panahon	Baby
2022 (38th)	Claudine Barretto	Deception	
2022 (38th)	Sharon Cuneta	Revirginized	
2022 (38th)	Rita Daniela	Huling Ulan Sa Tag-Araw	
2022 (38th)	Alessandra de Rossi	My Amanda	
2022 (38th)	Janine Gutierrez	Dito At Doon	
2022 (38th)	Angelica Panganiban	Love Or Money	
2022 (38th)	Yassi Pressman	More Than Blue	
2022 (38th)	Maja Salvador	Arisaka	
2023 (39th)
2023 (39th)	Nadine Lustre‡	Deleter	Lyra
2023 (39th)	Andrea Del Rosario	May-December-January	
2023 (39th)	Max Eigenmann	12 Weeks	
2023 (39th)	Janine Gutierrez	Bakit Hindi Mo Sabihin	
2023 (39th)	Liza Lorena	Family Matters	
2023 (39th)	Therese Malvar	Broken Blooms	
2023 (39th)	Heaven Peralejo	Nanahimik ang Gabi	
2024 (40th)
2024 (40th)	Maricel Soriano (triple tied)‡	In His Mother's Eyes	Lucy
2024 (40th)	Nora Aunor (triple tied)‡	Pieta	Rebecca
2024 (40th)	Vilma Santos (triple tied)‡	When I Met You in Tokyo	Azon
2024 (40th)	Gina Alajar	Monday First Screening	
2024 (40th)	Kathryn Bernardo	A Very Good Girl	
2024 (40th)	Sharon Cuneta	Family of Two	
2024 (40th)	Ai-Ai Delas Alas	Litrato	
2024 (40th)	Alessandra De Rossi	What If	
2024 (40th)	Gladys Reyes	Apag	
2024 (40th)	Marian Rivera	Rewind	
2025 (41st)
2025 (41st)	Vilma Santos ‡	Uninvited	Lilia
2025 (41st)	Kathryn Bernardo	Hello, Love, Again	
2025 (41st)	Shamaine Buencamino	Pushcart Tales	
2025 (41st)	Rebecca Chuaunsu	Her Locket	
2025 (41st)	Lovi Poe	Guilty Pleasure	
2025 (41st)	Sue Prado	Your Mother’s Son	
2025 (41st)	Marian Rivera	Balota	
2025 (41st)	Judy Ann Santos	Espantaho	

== Multiple Winners ==
Actor	Number of Wins
Vilma Santos	10
Nora Aunor	7
Sharon Cuneta	2
Maricel Soriano	2
Jaclyn Jose	2
Lorna Tolentino	2
Sylvia Sanchez	2
Angel Locsin	2
Nida Blanca	2
Ai-Ai delas Alas	2
