= PMPC Star Award for Movie Actor of the Year =

Star Award for Movie Actor of the Year
- Awarded for: Best Performance by an Actor in a Leading Role
- Country: Philippines
- Presented by: Philippine Movie Press Club
- First award: 1985
- Currently held by: Aga Muhlach; Uninvited (2025); Dennis Trillo; Green Bones (2025)

The Star Award for Movie Actor of the Year is one of the PMPC Star Award for Movies recognizing the outstanding films in the Philippines every year. It was operated by paid tabloid reporters founded by the Philippine Movie Press Club since 1985.

== Winners and nominees ==
The list may be incomplete such as some of the names of the nominees and the roles portrayed especially during the early years of PMPC Star Award For Movie.

In the lists below, the winner of the award for each year is shown first, followed by the other nominees.

Table key
| ‡ | Indicates the winner |

| Year | Actor | Film | Role |
|---|---|---|---|
1985 (1st)
| 1985 (1st) | Rudy Fernandez | Batuigas: Pasukuin si Waway | |
1986 (2nd)
| 1986 (2nd) | Phillip Salvador | Kapit sa Patalim: Bayan Ko | |
1987 (3rd)
| 1987 (3rd) | Joel Torre | Unfaithful Wife | |
1988 (4th)
| 1988 (4th) | Tonton Gutierrez | Saan Nagtatago ang Pag-ibig | |
1989 (5th)
| 1989 (5th) | Ace Vergel | Anak Ng Cabron | |
1990 (6th)
| 1990 (6th) | Tirso Cruz III | Bilangin Mo ang Bituin sa Langit | Anselmo |
1991 (7th)
| 1991 (7th) | Christopher de Leon | Biktima | |
1992 (8th)
| 1992 (8th) | Christopher de Leon | Ipagpatawad Mo | |
1993 (9th)
| 1993 (9th) | Aga Muhlach | Sinungaling Mong Puso | |
1994 (10th)
| 1994 (10th) | Christopher de Leon (tied); Phillip Salvador (tied) | Gaano kita Kamahal; Masahol pa sa Hayup | |
1995 (11th)
| 1995 (11th) | Phillip Salvador | Ka Hector | |
1996 (12th)
| 1996 (12th) | Richard Gomez‡ | Dahas | |
1997 (13th)
| 1997 (13th) | Christopher De Leon ‡ | Madrasta | |
| 1997 (13th) | Eddie Garcia | Bakit may kahapon pa? (original title) | |
1998 (14th)
| 1998 (14th) | Patrick Garcia ‡ | Batang PX | |
| 1998 (14th) | Albert Martinez | Batang PX | |
| 1998 (14th) | Christopher De Leon | Nasaan ang puso | |
1999 (25th)
| 1999 (25th) | Cesar Montano ‡ | José Rizal | José Rizal |
2000 (16th)
| 2000 (16th) | Ricky Davao ‡ | Saranggola | |
| 2000 (16th) | Albert Martinez | Sidhi | |
2001 (17th)
| 2001 (17th) | Carlos Morales‡ | Laro Sa Baga | |
2002 (18th)
| 2002 (18th) | Ricky Davao‡ | Minsan May Isang Puso | |
2003 (19th)
| 2003 (19th) | Yul Servo‡ | Laman | |
2004 (20th)
| 2004 (20th) | Jiro Manio‡ | Magnifico | |
2005 (21st)
| 2005 (21st) | Dennis Trillo‡ | Mahal kita 1941 | |
2006 (22nd)
| 2006 (22nd) | Aga Muhlach‡ | Dubai | |
| 2006 (22nd) | Eddie Garcia | ICU Bed #7 | |
| 2006 (22nd) | Robin Padilla | La visa loca | |
| 2006 (22nd) | Diether Ocampo | Nasaan ka man | |
| 2006 (22nd) | Ricky Davao | Mga pusang gala | |
2007 (23rd)
| 2007 (23rd) | Jericho Rosales (tied) ‡ | Pacquiao: The Movie | |
| 2007 (23rd) | Piolo Pascual (tied) ‡ | Don't Give Up on Us | |
| 2007 (23rd) | Cesar Montano | Ligalig | |
| 2007 (23rd) | John Arcilla | Compound | |
| 2007 (23rd) | Ryan Agoncillo | Kasal, kasali, kasalo | |
2008 (24th)
| 2008 (24th) | Paolo Contis‡ | Banal | |
| 2008 (24th) | Aga Muhlach | A Love Story | |
| 2008 (24th) | John Lloyd Cruz | One More Chance | |
| 2008 (24th) | Piolo Pascual | Paano kita iibigin | |
| 2008 (24th) | Sid Lucero | Selda | |
| 2008 (24th) | Ryan Eigenmann | Baliw | |
2009 (25th)
| 2009 (25th) | Jericho Rosales‡ | Baler | |
| 2009 (25th) | Aga Muhlach | When Love Begins... | |
| 2009 (25th) | Allen Dizon | Paupahan | |
| 2009 (25th) | Baron Geisler | Jay | |
| 2009 (25th) | Carlo Aquino | Carnivore | |
| 2009 (25th) | John Lloyd Cruz | A Very Special Love | |
| 2009 (25th) | Ronnie Lazaro | Yanggaw | |
2010 (26th)
| 2010 (26th) | John Lloyd Cruz‡ | In My Life | |
| 2010 (26th) | Lou Veloso | Colorum | |
| 2010 (26th) | Allen Dizon | Dukot | |
| 2010 (26th) | Ramon 'Bong' Revilla Jr. | Ang panday | |
| 2010 (26th) | Roderick Paulate | Ded na si Lolo | |
2011 (27th)
| 2011 (27th) | Coco Martin‡ | Noy | |
| 2011 (27th) | Christopher De Leon | Sa'yo lamang | |
| 2011 (27th) | John Lloyd Cruz | Miss You Like Crazy | |
| 2011 (27th) | Baron Geisler | Donor | |
| 2011 (27th) | Fanny Serrano | Tarima | |
| 2011 (27th) | Yul Servo | Rosario | |
2012 (28th)
| 2012 (28th) | Aga Muhlach (tied)‡ | In the Name of Love | |
| 2012 (28th) | Jorge Estregan (tied)‡ | Manila Kingpin: The Asiong Salonga Story (2011) | |
| 2012 (28th) | Derek Ramsay | No Other Woman | |
| 2012 (28th) | Dingdong Dantes | Segunda mano | |
| 2012 (28th) | Jericho Rosales | Yesterday Today Tomorrow | |
| 2012 (28th) | Martin Escudero | Zombadings 1: Patayin sa Shokot si Remington | |
| 2012 (28th) | Ryan Agoncillo | My Househusband: Ikaw na! | |
2013 (29th)
| 2013 (29th) | Jorge Estregan‡ | El Presidente | |
| 2013 (29th) | Aga Muhlach | Of All the Things | |
| 2013 (29th) | Coco Martin | Sta. Niña | |
| 2013 (29th) | Dingdong Dantes | One More Try | |
| 2013 (29th) | Eddie Garcia | Bwakaw | |
| 2013 (29th) | Jericho Rosales | Alagwa | |
| 2013 (29th) | John Lloyd Cruz | The Mistress | |
2014 (30th)
| 2014 (30th) | Vice Ganda‡ | Girl, Boy, Bakla, Tomboy | |
| 2014 (30th) | Dingdong Dantes | Dance of the Steel Bars | |
| 2014 (30th) | Jake Macapagal | Metro Manila | |
| 2014 (30th) | Joel Torre | On the Job | |
| 2014 (30th) | Jorge Estregan | Boy Golden | |
| 2014 (30th) | Piolo Pascual | On the Job | |
| 2014 (30th) | Robin Padilla | 10000 Hours | |
2015 (31st)
| 2015 (31st) | John Lloyd Cruz (tied)‡ | The Trial | |
| 2015 (31st) | Piolo Pascual (tied)‡ | Starting Over Again | |
| 2015 (31st) | Dennis Trillo | The Janitor | |
| 2015 (31st) | John Estrada | Trophy Wife | |
| 2015 (31st) | Derek Ramsay | English Only, Please | |
| 2015 (31st) | Robert Arevalo | Where I Am King Hari ng Tondo (original title) | |
| 2015 (31st) | Robin Padilla | Bonifacio: Ang unang pangulo | |
2016 (32nd)
| 2016 (32nd) | Dennis Trillo (tied)‡ | Felix Manalo | |
| 2016 (32nd) | Piolo Pascual (tied)‡ | Silong | |
| 2016 (32nd) | Daniel Padilla | Crazy Beautiful You | Kiko Alcantara |
| 2016 (32nd) | Jericho Rosales | Walang Forever | |
| 2016 (32nd) | JM De Guzman | Tandem | |
| 2016 (32nd) | John Arcilla | Heneral Luna | |
| 2016 (32nd) | John Lloyd Cruz | Honor Thy Father | |
| 2016 (32nd) | Richard Gomez | The Love Affair | |
2017 (33rd)
| 2017 (33rd) | Daniel Padilla‡ | Barcelona: A Love Untold | Elias Antonio |
| 2017 (33rd) | Tommy Abuel | Dagsin | |
| 2017 (33rd) | Paolo Ballesteros | Die Beautiful | |
| 2017 (33rd) | John Lloyd Cruz | Just The 3 Of Us | |
| 2017 (33rd) | Dingdong Dantes | The Unmarried Wife | |
| 2017 (33rd) | JC De Vera | Best Partee Ever | |
| 2017 (33rd) | Ronwaldo Martin | Pamilya Ordinaryo | |
| 2017 (33rd) | Zanjoe Marudo | The Third Party | |
| 2017 (33rd) | Alden Richards | Imagine You And Me | |
| 2017 (33rd) | Bembol Roco | Pauwi Na | |
2018 (34th)
| 2018 (34th) | Raymond Francisco‡ | Bhoy Intsik | |
| 2018 (34th) | Dingdong Dantes | Seven Sundays | |
| 2018 (34th) | Joshua Garcia | Love You To The Stars And Back | |
| 2018 (34th) | Jojit Lorenzo | Changing Partners | |
| 2018 (34th) | Aga Muhlach | Seven Sundays | |
| 2018 (34th) | Piolo Pascual | Last Night | |
| 2018 (34th) | Robin Padilla | Unexpectedly Yours | |
| 2018 (34th) | Derek Ramsay | All Of You | |
| 2018 (34th) | Jericho Rosales | Siargao | |
| 2018 (34th) | Vic Sotto | Meant To Beh | |
2019 (35th)
| 2019 (35th) | Ogie Alcasid‡ | Kuya Wes | |
| 2019 (35th) | Nonie Buencamino | Distance | |
| 2019 (35th) | Paolo Contis | Through Night And Day | |
| 2019 (35th) | Dingdong Dantes | Sid And Aya: Not A Love Story | |
| 2019 (35th) | Eddie Garcia | Rainbow’s Sunset | |
| 2019 (35th) | Coco Martin | Jack Em Popoy | |
| 2019 (35th) | Daniel Padilla | The Hows Of Us | |
| 2019 (35th) | Piolo Pascual | Ang Panahon Ng Halimaw | |
| 2019 (35th) | James Reid | Never Not Love You | |
| 2019 (35th) | Vic Sotto | Jack Em Popoy | |
2020 (36th)
| 2020 (36th) | Alden Richards‡ | Hello, Love, Goodbye | |
| 2020 (36th) | Louise Abuel | Edward | |
| 2020 (36th) | Carlo Aquino | Isa Pa With Feelings | |
| 2020 (36th) | Gold Azeron | Metamorphosis | |
| 2020 (36th) | Raymond Bagatsing | Quezon’s Game | |
| 2020 (36th) | Elijah Canlas | Kalel, 15 | |
| 2020 (36th) | Jansen Magpusao | John Dever Trending | |
| 2020 (36th) | Aga Muhlach | Miracle In Cell No. 7 | |
| 2020 (36th) | Julio Sabenorio | Guerrero Dos, Tuloy Ang Laban | |
2021 (37th)
| 2021 (37th) | John Arcilla‡ | The Healing Priest | |
| 2021 (37th) | Paulo Avelino | Fan Girl | |
| 2021 (37th) | Enchong Dee | Alter Me | |
| 2021 (37th) | Nanding Josef | Lahi, Hayop | |
| 2021 (37th) | Xian Lim | Untrue | |
| 2021 (37th) | Phillip Salvador | Isa Pang Bahaghari | |
| 2021 (37th) | Alfred Vargas | Tagpuan | |
2022 (38th)
| 2022 (38th) | Vince Tañada ‡ | Katips | |
| 2022 (38th) | John Arcilla | On the Job: The Missing 8 | |
| 2022 (38th) | Christian Bables | Big Night! | |
| 2022 (38th) | John Lloyd Cruz | Historia Ni Ha | |
| 2022 (38th) | Dingdong Dantes | A Hard Day | |
| 2022 (38th) | Paolo Gumabao | Lockdown | |
| 2022 (38th) | Daniel Padilla | Kun Maupay Man It Panahon | |
| 2022 (38th) | Piolo Pascual | My Amanda | |
| 2022 (38th) | JC Santos | More Than Blue | |
| 2022 (38th) | Dennis Trillo | On the Job: The Missing 8 | |
2023 (39th)
| 2023 (39th) | Baron Geisler‡ | Doll House | |
| 2023 (39th) | John Arcilla | Reroute | |
| 2023 (39th) | Elijah Canlas | Live Scream | |
| 2023 (39th) | John Lloyd Cruz | Kapag Wala Nang Mga Alon | |
| 2023 (39th) | Jeric Gonzales | Broken Blooms | |
| 2023 (39th) | Juan Karlos Labajo | Blue Room | |
| 2023 (39th) | Noel Trinidad | Family Matters | |
2024 (40th)
| 2024 (40th) | Alden Richards (tied)‡ | Five Breakups and a Romance | |
| 2024 (40th) | Dingdong Dantes (tied)‡ | Rewind | |
| 2024 (40th) | Sean De Guzman | Fall Guy | |
| 2024 (40th) | Christopher De Leon | When I Met You In Tokyo | |
| 2024 (40th) | Cedrick Juan | Gomburza | |
| 2024 (40th) | Coco Martin | Apag | |
| 2024 (40th) | Piolo Pascual | Mallari | |
| 2024 (40th) | Roderick Paulate | In His Mother's Eyes | |
| 2024 (40th) | Romnick Sarmenta | About Us But Not About Us | |
| 2024 (40th) | Alfred Vargas | Pieta | |
2025 (41st)
| 2025 (41st) | Aga Muhlach (tied)‡ | Uninvited | |
| 2025 (41st) | Dennis Trillo (tied)‡ | Green Bones | |
| 2025 (41st) | Arjo Atayde | Topakk | |
| 2025 (41st) | Seth Fedelin | My Future You | |
| 2025 (41st) | Joshua Garcia | Un/Happy For You | |
| 2025 (41st) | Baron Geisler | Moro | |
| 2025 (41st) | Piolo Pascual | Moro | |
| 2025 (41st) | Alden Richards | Hello, Love, Again | |

=== Multiple Winners ===
| Actor | Number of Wins |
|---|---|
| Christopher De Leon | 4 |
| Aga Muhlach | 4 |
| Phillip Salvador | 3 |
| Dennis Trillo | 3 |
| Piolo Pascual | 3 |
| Ricky Davao | 2 |
| Jericho Rosales | 2 |
| Jorge Estregan | 2 |
| John Lloyd Cruz | 2 |
| Alden Richards | 2 |
