= Vincent de Jesus =

Filipino composer (born 1968)

Vincent Abenojar de Jesus
- Born: June 10, 1968 (age 58); Philippines
- Education: College of Music Piano and Voice major
- Alma mater: University of the Philippines, (Music)
- Occupations: composer; librettist; actor; musical director; writer; educator
- Years active: 1983–present
- Employers: Ateneo de Manila University; GMA Network
- Known for: musical theater; film scores; television scores
- Notable work: Care Divas; Changing Partners; Himala: Isang Musikal; Kung Paano Ako Naging Leading Lady; Si Juan Tamad, Ang Diablo, at ang Limang Milyong Boto; Skin Deep; Zsazsa Zaturnnah Ze Muzikal; Zsazsa Zaturnnah Ze Muveeh
- Awards: Cinema One Originals Award; Entertainment Press - Golden Screen Awards; FAMAS Award; Film Academy of the Philippines - Luna Award; Gawad Tanglaw for Best Achievement in Film Music; GEMS Award; Manunuri ng Pelikulang Pilipino - Gawad Urian; Palanca Awards for Literature; Philippine Movie Press Club Star Awards; Philstage Gawad Buhay Awards for Outstanding Original Libretto

Vincent Abenojar De Jesus is a Filipino composer, librettist, musical director, writer, lyricist, actor, singer, and educator known for his work in theater, film, and television. De Jesus has written the music and libretti for several Filipino stage musicals, including Zsazsa Zaturnnah Ze Muzikal, Changing Partners, and Care Divas. In addition to his theater work, he has composed musical scores for films including Ang Babae sa Septic Tank and Isang Himala.

He is a two-time recipient of the Don Carlos Palanca Memorial Awards for Literature. His accolades also include three Gawad Urian Awards for Best Musical Score, eight Star Awards for Movies for Best Musical Score, two Luna Awards for Best Musical Score, two MMFF Awards for Best Musical Score and Original Theme Song and a FAMAS Award for Best Adapted Screenplay.

== Early life and education ==
Vincent Abenojar De Jesus was born to parents who were artists and educators. He began exploring the arts early, writing poetry and composing short piano pieces during his childhood. In 1983, he became a member of the Philippine Educational Theater Association (PETA), remaining affiliated with the organization until 2020. He studied piano and voice at the University of the Philippines Diliman College of Music.

== Career ==
=== Theater ===
De Jesus' theatrical work spans multiple Filipino stage musicals. He co-wrote the libretto of Himala: Isang Musikal with Ricky Lee. It first premiered in 2003 and was restaged until 2019. In 2006, he composed the music for Zsazsa Zaturnnah Ze Muzikal which was an adaptation of the graphic novel by Carlo Vergara. The following year, De Jesus provided the composition, arrangement, and musical direction for Batang Rizal. For his work, he received the Gawad Buhay Award for Outstanding Musical Direction. Skin Deep followed in 2008, which earned him Gawad Buhay Award for Outstanding Original Libretto. His libretto and composition for Si Juan Tamad, Ang Diablo, at Ang Limang Milyong Boto brought him further acclaim, winning Outstanding Original Libretto and Outstanding Original Composition in the Gawad Buhay Awards in 2009.

In 2011, De Jesus' Care Divas premiered at the PETA Theater Center. He wrote the libretto and provided musical direction for the musical while also joining its ensemble. In 2015, he was the musical director and composer for Kung Paano Ako Naging Leading Lady.

De Jesus' other notable productions include Changing Partners (2016), and Tabing Ilog: The Musical (2023).

=== Film ===
In film, De Jesus has worked as a musical scorer, screenwriter, and actor.

In 2013, he appeared as the "Assistant Director" in the Cinemalayan film, Esktra. He also portrayed the father of John Lloyd Cruz's Ronald in the Star Cinema film, The Trial.

=== Television ===
He wrote for and portrayed the character Pipay in Camera Café, a sitcom produced by Euro-Asia Media Group Ltd. and aired on GMA Network. The series won Best Comedy Program at the 13th Asian Television Awards. He later co-hosted Wipeout: Matira ang Matibay on GMA Network alongside Paolo Contis.

De Jesus served as the comedy head writer of GMA Network’s variety show All-Out Sundays and also worked as the arranger and musical director for its comedy segments until 2024.

== Accolades ==
=== Film ===
Film awards and nominations received by Vincent de Jesus
Awards and Nominations
Organization	Year	Work	Category	Result	Ref.
CineFilipino Film Festival	2016	Straight to the Heart	Best Supporting Actor	Nominated	
Cinema One Originals Digital Film Festival	2017	Changing Partners	Best Screenplay (Note: Shared with Lilit Reyes.)	Nominated	
Cinema One Originals Digital Film Festival	2017	Changing Partners	Best Music	Won	
FAMAS Award	2006	Ako Legal Wife: Mano Po 4?	Best Musical Score	Nominated	
FAMAS Award	2009	Baler	Best Musical Score	Nominated	
FAMAS Award	2018	Changing Partners	Best Adapted Screenplay (Note: Shared with Lilit Reyes.)	Won	
Gawad Urian Award	2004	Crying Ladies	Best Music	Nominated	
Gawad Urian Award	2006	La Visa Loca	Best Music	Won	
Gawad Urian Award	2007	Zsazsa Zaturnnah Ze Moveeh	Best Music	Won	
Gawad Urian Award	2008	Pisay	Best Music	Nominated	
Gawad Urian Award	2018	Changing Partners	Best Music	Nominated	
Golden Screen Awards	2006	La Visa Loca	Best Musical Score	Nominated	
Golden Screen Awards	2006	La Visa Loca	Best Original Song (Note: Shared with Mark Meily and Isay Alvarez.)	Nominated	
Golden Screen Awards	2007	Zsazsa Zaturnnah Ze Moveeh	Best Original Song (Note: Shared with Zsa Zsa Padilla.)	Won	
Golden Screen Awards	2008	Pisay	Best Musical Score (Note: Shared with Jobin Ballesteros.)	Won	
Golden Screen Awards	2012	Ang Babae sa Septic Tank	Best Musical Score	Won	
Golden Screen Awards	2013	I Do Bidoo Bidoo: Heto nAPO Sila!	Best Musical Score	Won	
Luna Award	2005	Santa Santita	Best Musical Score	Nominated	
Luna Award	2006	Ako Legal Wife: Mano Po 4?	Best Musical Score	Nominated	
Luna Award	2007	Zsazsa Zaturnnah Ze Moveeh	Best Musical Score	Won	
Luna Award	2009	I.T.A.L.Y. (I Trust and Love You)	Best Musical Score	Nominated	
Luna Award	2009	Baler	Best Musical Score	Won	
Luna Award	2012	Ang Babae sa Septic Tank	Best Musical Score	Nominated	
Luna Award	2018	Changing Partners	Best Music	Nominated	
Luna Award	2018	Changing Partners	Best Screenplay (Note: Shared with Lilit Reyes.)	Nominated	
Metro Manila Film Festival	2013	Girl, Boy, Bakla, Tomboy	Best Musical Score	Nominated	
Metro Manila Film Festival	2015	My Bebe Love: #Kilig Pa More	Best Musical Score	Nominated	
Metro Manila Film Festival	2024	Isang Himala	Best Original Theme Song (Note: Shared with Ricky Lee and Juan Karlos Labajo.)	Won	
Metro Manila Film Festival	2024	Isang Himala	Best Musical Score	Won	
PMPC Star Awards for Movies	2006	Let The Love Begin	Movie Musical Scorer of the Year	Won	
PMPC Star Awards for Movies	2007	ZsaZsa Zaturnnah Ze Moveeh	Movie Musical Scorer of the Year	Won	
PMPC Star Awards for Movies	2008	Ang Cute ng Ina Mo!	Movie Musical Scorer of the Year	Nominated	
PMPC Star Awards for Movies	2008	Pisay	Digital Movie Musical Scorer of the Year (Note: Shared with Jobin Ballesteros.)	Won	
PMPC Star Awards for Movies	2009	Baler	Movie Musical Scorer of the Year	Nominated	
PMPC Star Awards for Movies	2012	Ang Babae sa Septic Tank	Digital Movie Musical Scorer of the Year	Won	
PMPC Star Awards for Movies	2013	I Do Bidoo Bidoo: Heto nAPO Sila!	Digital Movie Musical Scorer of the Year	Won	
PMPC Star Awards for Movies	2014	Ekstra	Movie Supporting Actor of the Year	Nominated	
PMPC Star Awards for Movies	2014	Ekstra	Indie Movie Musical Scorer of the Year	Nominated	
PMPC Star Awards for Movies	2014	Kimmy Dora: Ang Kiyemeng Prequel	Movie Original Theme Song of the Year (Note: Shared with Yeng Constantino.)	Nominated	
PMPC Star Awards for Movies	2015	The Trial	Movie Supporting Actor of the Year	Nominated	
PMPC Star Awards for Movies	2018	Changing Partners	Indie Movie Screenwriter of the Year (Note: Shared with Lilit Reyes.)	Won	
PMPC Star Awards for Movies	2018	Changing Partners	Indie Movie Musical Scorer of the Year	Won	
PMPC Star Awards for Movies	2025	Isang Himala	Movie Musical Scorer of the Year	Won	
PMPC Star Awards for Movies	2025	Isang Himala	Movie Theme Song of the Year (Note: Shared with Juan Karlos Labajo.)	Won	

=== Theater ===
Theater awards and nominations received by Vincent de Jesus
Awards and Nominations
Organization	Year	Work	Category	Result	Ref.
Gawad Buhay Awards	2008	Skin Deep	Outstanding Libretto	Won	
Gawad Buhay Awards	2008	Batang Rizal	Outstanding Musical Direction	Won	
Gawad Buhay Awards	2011	Care Divas	Outstanding Musical Composition	Nominated	
Gawad Buhay Awards	2011	Care Divas	Outstanding Sound Design	Nominated	
Gawad Buhay Awards	2011	Care Divas	Original Original Libretto	Won	
Gawad Buhay Awards	2011	Care Divas	Original Musical Direction	Won	
Gawad Buhay Awards	2019	Si Juan Tamad, ang Diyablo at ang Limang Milyong Boto	Outstanding Original Libretto	Won	
Gawad Buhay Awards	2019	Si Juan Tamad, ang Diyablo at ang Limang Milyong Boto	Original Musical Composition	Won	

=== Literary awards ===
Awards and nominations received by Vincent de Jesus
Organization	Year	Work	Category	Result	Ref.
Don Carlos Palanca Memorial Awards	2005	Ateng	Dulang May Isang Yugto	Third	
Don Carlos Palanca Memorial Awards	2017	Changing Partners	Dulang Ganap ang Haba	Third	
