= Film awards in the Philippines =

There are many institutions, academies and fellowships in the Philippines that hands out awards, citations and recognitions to outstanding film achievements for a certain calendar year.

== History ==
=== 1950–1975 ===
The Maria Clara Awards was established in 1950 by The Manila Times. However, it was criticized for being judged only by movie outsiders. In response, a group of writers established the Filipino Academy of Movie Arts and Sciences Awards (FAMAS Awards) in 1952.

In 1975, the first Metropolitan Film Festival was held in commemoration of the third anniversary of the continuation of Martial Law.

=== 1975-1990 ===
From 1952 to 1976, the FAMAS was the sole award-giving body for film in the Philippines.

On May 1, 1976, a group of nine film critics and writers formed the Manunuri ng Pelikulang Pilipino (English: Filipino Film Critics), an organization aiming at giving recognition to Filipino film achievements through the eyes of a film critic. The MPP formed the Gawad Urian Awards, the first award-giving body to contest the long-reigning FAMAS Awards. The Gawad Urian gave a Philippine equivalent to the New York Film Critics Circle Awards. This organization was also created after the first tie in lead categories was recorded in 21st FAMAS Awards in 1973. It was in the Best Actress category, in which both Boots Anson-Roa and Vilma Santos won.

In 1977, the Metropolitan Film Festival was changed to its current name, Metro Manila Film Festival.

During the commercialist era of movies in the 1980s, more award-giving bodies have sprung up to honor film achievements. In 1981, President Ferdinand Marcos passed Executive Order 640-A, which established the Film Academy of the Philippines, the Philippines' official counterpart of the United States' Academy of Motion Picture Arts and Sciences. The FAP handed out the first Luna Awards (then called the FAP Award until 2005) in 1983 to honor film achievements in 1982.

In addition, the Catholic Church also established the Catholic Mass Media Awards (CMMA). In 1985, the Philippine Movie Press Club initiated the Star Awards for Movies and Television, which is currently the Philippines' Golden Globes' counterpart.

Under the auspices of First Lady Imelda Marcos, the first Filipino international film festival was held in 1982: the Manila International Film Festival. This prestigious festival opened at the Manila Film Center.

==== Grand Slam ====
During the 1980s, the term grand slam became popular. The Philippine grand slam is an unofficial moniker given to an actor or actress who had won the following awards: FAMAS Awards, Gawad Urian, CMMA and FAP Awards (became Luna Awards in 2005) in one year. CMMA though stopped giving acting awards by 1990 while Star Awards started giving their awards in 1985. The moniker was first earned by actress Vilma Santos in 1983 when she won the FAMAS, Gawad Urian, CMMA and FAP Awards for her performance in the Ishmael Bernal film Relasyon.

=== 1990–present ===
The number of film award-giving bodies in the Philippines grew beginning in the 1990s. Several university scholars and teachers formed their own awards, beginning with the Young Critics Circle in 1990, with members coming from various disciplines of the country's top universities. Gawad Pasado and Gawad Tanglaw followed suit in 1998 and 2002, respectively.

In 2003, several members of the PMPC formed a breakaway group called the Entertainment Press Society and started handing out awards – the Golden Screen Awards – in 2004.

== Awards ==
=== First four ===
- FAMAS Awards (Filipino Academy of Movie Arts and Sciences)
- Gawad Urian (Manunuri ng Pelikulang Pilipino or Filipino Film Critics)
- Luna Awards (Film Academy of the Philippines)
- Star Award for Movies (Philippine Movie Press Club)

=== Post-1990 bodies ===
- Young Critics Circle Film Desk Awards
- Gawad PASADO (Pampelikulang Samahan ng mga Dalubguro or Film Association of Professors) Backronym meaning: To pass

=== Post-2000 bodies ===
- Gawad TANGLAW (Tagapuring mga Akademik ng Aninong Gumagalaw or Academic Praisers of Motion Pictures) Backronym meaning: light
- Gawad Genio Awards (Film Critics Academe of Zamboanga City)
- The EDDYS or The Entertainment Editors' Choice Awards (Society of Philippines Entertainment Editors (SPEEd))

=== Post-2020 bodies ===
• Primetime Media Choice Awards

- Manila Film Critics Circle Award
- Philippine Arts, Film and Television Awards (Philippine Academy of Film and Television Arts)

== Festivals ==
=== Consistently held ===
- Metro Manila Film Festival (held every December 25 to January 7 in all cinemas nationwide since 1975)
- Cinemalaya Philippine Independent Film Festival (held at the Cultural Center of the Philippines, select Ayala Malls theaters and Vista Mall cinemas every July or August since 2005)
- Cinema One Originals (held at select malls in Metro Manila and Cebu every October or November since 2005)
- QCinema International Film Festival (held at select theaters in Quezon City every October since 2013)
- Sinag Maynila Film Festival (held in select theaters in Metro Manila every March or April since 2015)
- Pista ng Pelikulang Pilipino (held every August or September in all cinemas nationwide since 2017)

=== Intermittently held ===
- Cinemanila International Film Festival (held at select malls within Metro Manila every November)
- Sineng Pambansa (held every June and November in select Philippine cities)
- CineFilipino Film Festival (held every other year from 2013–2018)
- ToFarm [The Outstanding Farmers in the Philippines] Film Festival (held every September in select cinemas nationwide from 2016–2018)

== Defunct ==
- Maria Clara Awards (1950–1951) (resurrected in 2006 as a temporary venue of awards for the FAMAS, which was undergoing a leadership crisis and an anti-awards night ruling from the Securities and Exchange Commission)
- Catholic Mass Media Awards
- Manila International Film Festival
- Golden Screen Awards (Entertainment Press Society (ENPRESS)) – breakaway group from PMPC (2004–2015)
