= 2nd PMPC Star Awards for Movies =

1985 Philippine Movie Press Club awards

2nd Star Awards for Movies
- Date: 1986
- Site: Folks Arts Theater

Highlights
- Best Picture: Miguelito: Ang Batang Rebelde; Hinugot sa Langit

The 2nd PMPC Star Awards for Movies by the Philippine Movie Press Club (PMPC), honored the best Filipino films of 1985. The ceremony took place in 1986 in Folk Arts Theater.

Miguelito: Ang Batang Rebelde and Hinugot sa Langit tied for Movie of the Year, while Lino Brocka won for Movie Director of the Year for Kapit sa Patalim.

== Winners ==
The following are the winner for the 2nd PMPC Star Awards for Movies, covering films released in 1985.

=== Major category ===
- Movies of the Year
  - Miguelito, Ang Batang Rebelde (D'Wonder Films)
  - Hinugot Sa Langit (Regal Films)
- Movie Director of the Year
  - Lino Brocka (Kapit Sa Patalim)
- Movie Actor of the Year
  - Phillip Salvador (Kapit Sa Patalim)
- Movie Actress of the Year
  - Nida Blanca (Miguelito, Ang Batang Rebelde)
- Movie Supporting Actor of the Year
  - Lito Anzures (Paradise Inn)
- Movie Supporting Actress of the Year
  - Amy Austria (Hinugot Sa Langit)
- New Female Star of the Year
  - Stella Suarez, Jr. (Gamitin Mo Ako)
- New Male Star of the Year
  - Daniel Fernando (Scorpio Nights)
- New Movie Child Stars of the Year
  - Christopher Paloma (Inday Bote)
  - Katrin Gonzales (Ano ang Kulay Ng Mukha Ng Diyos?)

=== Technical category ===
- Original Movie Screenplay of the Year
  - Amado Lacuesta (Hinugot Sa Langit)
- Movie Screenplay of the Year (Adaptation)
  - Butch Dalisay (Ano Ang Kulay Ng Mukha Ng Diyos?)
- Movie Cinematographer of the Year
  - Romy Vitug (Paradise Inn)
- Movie Production Designer of the Year
  - Don Escudero (Scorpio Nights)
- Movie Editor of the Year
  - Jess Navarro (Hinugot Sa Langit)
- Movie Musical Scorer of the Year
  - Jimmy Fabregas (Scorpio Nights)
- Movie Theme Song of the Year
  - Willy Cruz (Bituing Walang Ningning)
- Movie Sound Engineer of the Year
  - Rudy Baldovino (Scorpio Nights)

=== Special awards ===
- Newsmakers of the Year - Nora Aunor and Tirso Cruz III
- Darling of the Press - Rudy Fernandez
- Movie Producer of the Year - Regal Films
- Star of the First Magnitude - Joseph Estrada
