= Aishite Imasu 1941: Mahal Kita =

- Release movie poster
- Directed by: Joel C. Lamangan
- Screenplay by: Ricardo Lee
- Story by: Ricardo Lee; Joel C. Lamangan
- Produced by: Roselle Monteverde-Teo
- Starring: Judy Ann Santos; Raymart Santiago; Dennis Trillo; Jay Manalo
- Cinematography: Rolly Manuel
- Edited by: Marya Ignacio
- Music by: Von de Guzman
- Production companies: Regal Films; BAS Films
- Distributed by: Regal Films; Toho
- Release date: December 25, 2004
- Running time: 106 minutes
- Country: Philippines
- Languages: Filipino; Japanese; English
- Budget: ₱75 million
- Box office: ₱26.3 million

Aishite Imasu 1941: Mahal Kita (Note: Both "Aishite imasu" (愛しています) and "Mahal kita" mean "I love you" in Japanese and Filipino, respectively.) is a 2004 Philippine romantic war drama film directed by Joel C. Lamangan from a story co-written with Ricky Lee, who solely made it into a screenplay. Starring Judy Ann Santos, Raymart Santiago, Jay Manalo, and Dennis Trillo, the film is a story of love, betrayal, and honour in wartime, set in the Japanese occupation of the Philippines (1941–1945) during World War II.

A co-production of Regal Films and BAS Films, the film was theatrically released on December 25, 2004, as an entry for the 30th Metro Manila Film Festival.

== Plot ==
In the town of San Nicolas, Virginia, nicknamed "Inya", is newly married to her childhood sweetheart, Edilberto, and is excited about starting a new family. Ignacio "Igna" Basa is Inya's best friend, a transgender woman who has been in love with Edilberto for years. However, their lives are interrupted by the start of the Pacific War in December 1941 and the subsequent Japanese invasion.

At the start of the Japanese occupation, Edilberto becomes a guerrilla leader in San Nicolas and takes the nom de guerre Berto. Ignacio becomes the movement's spy inside the Japanese forces. At the same time, she falls for Ichiru Hamaguchi, an Imperial Japanese Army official who returns her affections. Whenever Berto attacks a Japanese patrol, the latter burns a village and executes suspected guerrilla members under the direction of Maura, a collaborator. Maura discovers Ignacio's identity and divulges it to a Japanese officer, Hiroshi. He reports this to his superior Ichiru, who refuses to believe it until he suffers a nightmare of holding his father's blood in front of the Americans. He tries to make love to Igna, but the latter refuses. Ichiru reveals he knows Igna is transgender, and he does not care as long as he loves Igna.

After Berto’s family is massacred by the Japanese, he neglects his relationship with Inya, who suffers a series of miscarriages. He comes back to his senses when Inya is falsely accused of collaboration with the Japanese and is tortured. Berto tries to make amends with Inya but the latter refuses and sends him off to a mission in which he is killed, to Inya’s regret. Inya takes on Berto’s responsibilities as a guerrilla commander under his name.

As the guerrillas launch more raids, the Japanese brutally retaliate, holding the town mayor and others hostage. As Igna returns to camp after warning Inya of a raid, she is caught along with Ichiru by Maura and Hiroshi. Igna is beaten but later escapes with the help of Ichiru and a sympathetic colleague, Akihiro. Ichiru reveals to Igna that he knew she was helping the guerrillas all along but stayed quiet, saying that he did not want her to betray her country for him. Sheltering at the house of Igna’s stepmother Melba, Akihiro and Ichiru commit seppuku.

Igna again is arrested by Maura and Hiroshi and is tortured. Inya then raids the municipal hall and rescues Igna and the other hostages, while eliminating the Japanese garrison at the cost of several guerrillas. As Inya and Igna escape, Maura and Japanese reinforcements arrive and shoot Inya. She is shielded by Igna, who dies instead, whereupon Inya's men open fire on Maura's vehicle, killing her and the Japanese.

Decades later, an elderly Inya tells the truth about what happened during the war to local officials and her nephew, Senyang, who is revealed to be Akihiro’s granddaughter from an affair with a Filipina. As the officials discuss plans to commemorate the war dead, she leaves.

== Cast ==
Main cast

- Judy Ann Santos as Virginia "Binia/Vinia" and "Commander Berto" M. Marasingan-Manalang
- Raymart Santiago as Edilberto "Commander Berto" C. Manalang
- Jay Manalo as Ichiru Hamaguchi
- Dennis Trillo as Ignacio "Igna" Basa

Supporting cast

- Marco Alcaraz as Akihiro Yorokobe
- Angelu de Leon as Maura
- Jacklyn Jose as Tiya Melba
- Yasmien Kurdi as Senyang
- Anita Linda as Inya (old)
- T.J. Trinidad as Antonio
- Iya Villania as Julia
- Tony Mabesa as Mayor Aldecoa
- Domingo Landicho as Assistant to the Mayor
- Menggie Cobarrubias as Mayor Panotes
- Jim Pebanco as Edna
- Neil Ryan Sese as Hiroshi
- Mon Confiado as Alexander
- Gilleth Sandico as Edilberto's sister
- Tom Olivar as Edilberto's father
- Edna May Landicho as Edilberto's mother
- Kokoy Palma as Dinglasan
- Archie Adamos as Igna's father
- Virginia Joshen

== Themes ==
The film has been described as one of the "affirmative gay films" in Philippine cinema from the late 1990s to the early 2000s.

== Production ==
=== Writing ===
According to director Joel Lamangan, the film's plot was inspired by his townmate's wartime experiences. Ricky Lee, who co-wrote the story with Lamangan, took three days to write the screenplay. He revealed to the public that the project was rejected for five to seven years by various producers until Regal Films founder-executive producer Lily Y. Monteverde approved it.

=== Casting ===
The film marks the first time where Judy Ann Santos and Raymart Santiago acted together despite being from different networks and film studios at the time, with Santos being an exclusive TV talent of ABS-CBN who did film projects for Star Cinema and Regal and Santiago being an exclusive talent of GMA Network and Viva Films.

== Reception ==
=== Accolades ===
Accolades received by Aishite Imasu 1941: Mahal Kita
Year	Award	Category	Recipient(s)	Result	Ref.
2004	30th Metro Manila Film Festival	Best Picture	Aishite Imasu 1941: Mahal Kita	3rd	
2004	30th Metro Manila Film Festival	Best Actor	Raymart Santiago	Nominated	
2004	30th Metro Manila Film Festival	Best Actress	Judy Ann Santos	Nominated	
2004	30th Metro Manila Film Festival	Best Supporting Actor	Dennis Trillo	Won	
2004	30th Metro Manila Film Festival	Best Gender-Sensitive Film	Aishite Imasu 1941: Mahal Kita	Won	
2005	2nd Golden Screen Awards	Breakthrough Performance by an Actor	Dennis Trillo	Won	
2005	2nd Golden Screen Awards	Best Sound	Ramon Reyes	Nominated	
2005	2nd Golden Screen Awards	Best Original Song	"Hanggang Wakas"; Written by Felix Rivera and composed by Von de Guzman	Nominated	
2005	21st PMPC Star Awards for Movies	Movie of the Year	Aishite Imasu 1941: Mahal Kita	Nominated	
2005	21st PMPC Star Awards for Movies	Movie Actor of the Year	Dennis Trillo	Won	
2005	21st PMPC Star Awards for Movies	New Movie Actor of the Year	Dennis Trillo	Won	
2005	21st PMPC Star Awards for Movies	Movie Actress of the Year	Judy Ann Santos	Nominated	
2005	21st PMPC Star Awards for Movies	Best Supporting Actor	Jay Manalo	Won (Note: Tied with John Lloyd Cruz in Dubai.)	
2005	21st PMPC Star Awards for Movies	Director of the Year	Joel Lamangan	Nominated	
2005	21st PMPC Star Awards for Movies	Original Screenplay of the Year	Aishite Imasu 1941: Mahal Kita; Written by Ricky Lee and Joel Lamangan	Nominated	
2005	21st PMPC Star Awards for Movies	Editor of the Year	Marya Ignacio	Nominated	
2005	21st PMPC Star Awards for Movies	Production Designer of the Year	Joey Luna	Nominated	
2005	21st PMPC Star Awards for Movies	Original Theme Song of the Year	"Hanggang Wakas"; Written by Felix Rivera and composed by Von de Guzman	Nominated	
2005	28th Gawad Urian Awards	Best Supporting Actor	Dennis Trillo	Nominated	
2005	54th FAMAS Awards	FAMAS Award for Best Picture	Aishite Imasu 1941: Mahal Kita	Nominated	
2005	54th FAMAS Awards	Best Supporting Actor	Dennis Trillo	Won	
2005	54th FAMAS Awards	Best Supporting Actress	Angelu de Leon	Nominated	
2005	54th FAMAS Awards	Best Director	Joel Lamangan	Nominated	
2005	54th FAMAS Awards	Best Production Design	Joey Luna	Won	
2005	54th FAMAS Awards	Best Sound	Ramon Reyes	Won	
2005	23rd Luna Awards	Best Picture	Aishite Imasu 1941: Mahal Kita	Won	
2005	23rd Luna Awards	Best Director	Joel Lamangan	Won	
2005	23rd Luna Awards	Best Actor	Dennis Trillo	Won	
2005	23rd Luna Awards	Best Supporting Actor	Jay Manalo	Won	
2005	23rd Luna Awards	Best Production Design	Joey Luna	Won	
2005	23rd Luna Awards	Best Editing	Marya Ignacio	Won	
2005	23rd Luna Awards	Best Musical Score	Von de Guzman	Nominated	
2005	23rd Luna Awards	Best Sound	Ramon Reyes	Nominated	
