= 1st PMPC Star Awards for Movies =

1986 Philippine Movie Press Club awards

1st Star Awards for Movies
- Date: 1985

Highlights
- Best Picture: Sister Stella L.

The 1st PMPC Star Awards for Movies by the Philippine Movie Press Club (PMPC), honored the best Filipino films of 1984. The ceremony took place in 1985.

The PMPC Star Awards for Movies awarded Sister Stella L. the first Movie of the Year, Movie Supporting Actor of the Year, and Best Supporting Actress of the Year awards.

== Winners and nominees ==
The following are the nominations for the 1st PMPC Star Awards for Movies, covering films released in 1984.

Winners are listed first and indicated in bold.

=== Major categories ===
Movie of the Year	Movie Director of the Year
Winner: **Sister Stella L.**: Adultery; Soltero; Merika; Bulaklak sa City Jail; Alyas Baby Tsina	Winner: **Mario O'Hara** (**Bulaklak sa City Jail**): Mike de Leon (Sister Stella L.); Lino Brocka (Adultery); Jeric Soriano (Hotshots)
Movie Actor of the Year	Movie Actress of the Year
Winner: **Rudy Fernandez** (**Batuigas: Pasukuin si Wayway**): Phillip Salvador (Adultery); Jay Ilagan (Soltero); Dan Alvaro (Condemned); Tommy Abuel (Minsan May Pangarap)	Winner: **Nora Aunor** (**Merika)**: Nora Aunor (Bulaklak sa City Jail); Nora Aunor (Condemned); Vilma Santos (Sister Stella L.); Vilma Santos (Adultery)
Movie Supporting Actor of the Year	Movie Supporting Actress of the Year
Winner: **Tony Santos Sr.** (**Sister Stella L.**): Tom Olivar (Bulaklak sa City Jail); Michael de Mesa (Kaya Kung Abutin ang Langit); William Martinez (Shake, Rattle & Roll); Dindo Fernando (Alyas Baby Tsina); Jay Ilagan (Sister Stella L.); Cesar Aliparo (Merika)	Winner: **Laurice Guillen** (**Sister Stella L**.): Perla Bautista (Bulaklak ng City Jail); Gina Alajar (Condemned)
New Male Star of the Year	New Female Star of the Year
Winner:**Dan Alvaro (Condemned)**: Aga Muhlach; Gary Valenciano	Winner: **Maritez Gutierrez (Bulaklak sa City Jail)**: Sarsi Emmanuelle; Tanya Gomez
