= 2017 Palanca Awards =

Annual Philippine literary award

67th Palanca Awards
- Date: September 1, 2017
- Location: The Peninsula Manila, Makati, Philippines

The 67th Don Carlos Palanca Memorial Awards for Literature was held on September 1, 2017, at The Peninsula Manila in Makati to commemorate the memory of Don Carlos Palanca Sr. through an endeavor that would promote education and culture in the country. Fifty-one writers were awarded this year, with 23 of them being first-time awardees. Dr. Jose “Butch” Dalisay Jr. was Guest of Honor and Speaker at this year's awarding ceremony.

LIST OF WINNERS

The 2017 winners are divided into four categories:

== English Division ==
=== Novel ===
- Grand Prize: Glenn L. Diaz, The Quiet Ones

=== Short Story ===
- First Prize: John Bengan, "Disguise"
- Second Prize: Katrina Guiang Gomez, "Misericordia"
- Third Prize: Joe Bert Lazarte, "Don’t Blink"

=== Short Story for Children ===
- First Prize: No Winner
- Second Prize: No Winner
- Third Prize: No Winner

=== Essay ===
- First Prize: Michelle Josephine G. Rivera, "In My Father’s Kitchen"
- Second Prize: Paul Gideon D. Lasco, "The Art of 'Hugot' in our Republic of 'Sawi'"
- Third Prize: Jade Mark B. Capiñanes, "A Portrait of a Young Man as a Banak"

=== Poetry ===
- First Prize: Noelle Leslie dela Cruz, "Sisyphus on the Penrose Stairs: Meta-Reveries"
- Second Prize: Rodrigo V. Dela Peña Jr, "Blood Compact"
- Third Prize: Hurjay Medilo, "Elegy for a Dying World"

=== Poetry Written for Children ===
- First Prize: Cynthia Baculi-Condez, "From Dawn to Dusk"
- Second Prize: Patricia Celina A. Ngo, "Magical Mall of Mysteries"
- Third Prize: Ma. Amparo N. Warren, "Animal Songs/Just So Poems"

=== One-Act Play ===
- First Prize: No Winner
- Second Prize: No Winner
- Third Prize: Joshua L. Lim So, "Sa Syquia, Malate, Kabanata II: Letting The Days Go By"

=== Full-Length play ===
- First Prize: Dustin Edward D. Celestino, "The Story of This Father"
- Second Prize: Joachim Emilio B. Antonio, "exesanonymous.com"
- Third Prize: No Winner

== Filipino Division ==
=== Nobela ===
- Grand Prize: Eros Sanchez Atalia, Ang Ikatlong Anti-Kristo

=== Maikling Kwento ===
- First Prize: Andrian M. Legaspi, "Sa Pagitan ng Sabaw ng Chaolong at Hilab ng Tiyan"
- Second Prize: Valentine Dula, "Patintero"
- Third Prize: Nicko M. de Guzman, "Troll"

=== Maikling Kwentong Pambata ===
- First Prize: Maryrose Jairene Cruz-Eusebio, "Ang Patay-gutom"
- Second Prize: Josel Luigi F. Creencia, "Lato’t Ginto"
- Third Prize: Cheeno Marlo M. Sayuno, "Si Tiya Salome"

=== Sanaysay ===
- First Prize: Eugene Y. Evasco, "Ang Mapa ng Taglagas sa Aking Maleta"
- Second Prize: Will P. Ortiz, "Sisid"
- Third Prize: Mubarak M. Tahir, "Aden Bon Besen Uyag-Uyag (May Buhay Pa Pala)"

=== Tula ===
- First Prize: Christian R. Vallez, "Sa Pagitan ng Banal at Karnal"
- Second Prize: Jason G. Tabinas, "Na Inyong Ikinalulunod"
- Third Prize: Rogelio Dela Rosa Jr., "Tanghod at iba pang Paghihintay"

=== Tulang Pambata ===
- First Prize: John Vincent J. Bucal, "Muwang ng Musmos"
- Second Prize: Errol A. Merquita, "Tagulilong: Ang mga Nawawala"
- Third Prize: Paterno B. Baloloy Jr, "Agam-Agam ng Langgam"

=== Dulang may Isang Yugto ===
- First Prize: Eljay Castro Deldoc, "Pilipinas Kong Mahal With All the Overcoat"
- Second Prize: Rodolfo Vera, "Indigo Child"
- Third Prize: Dominique Beatrice T. La Victoria, "Ang Bata Sa Drum"

=== Dulang Ganap ang Haba ===
- First Prize: Dustin Edward D. Celestino, "Ang Pangahas na si Pepe Rodriguez"
- Second Prize: Joshua L. Lim So, "Araw-araw, Gabi-gabi"
- Third Prize: Vincent A. De Jesus, "Changing Partners"

=== Dulang Pampelikula ===
- First Prize: Rodolfo Vera, "Ang Aking Juan Luna"
- Second Prize: Kristian Sendon Cordero, "Kulto ni Santiago"
- Third Prize: Avelino Mark C. Balmes Jr., "Pablo Ocampo Extension"

== Regional Division ==
=== Short Story [Cebuano] ===
- First Prize: Jondy M. Arpilleda, "Bunok"
- Second Prize: Manuel M. Avenido Jr., "Panagtigi"
- Third prize: Errol A. Merquita, "Aninipot "

=== Short Story [Hiligaynon] ===
- First Prize: Jesus C. Insilada EdD, "Tinuom"
- Second Prize: Peter Solis Nery, "Ang Milagro sa Ermita"
- Third Prize: Leonard Francis M. Alcoran, "Ang Itlog nga wala Nagabalibad"

=== Short Story [Iluko] ===
- First Prize: Ronelyn Ramones, "Ti Lubong ni Anastasia"
- Second Prize: Lilia Quindoza Santiago, "Siak Ti Interpreteryo"
- Third Prize: Ariel Sotelo Tabag, "Dado"

== Kabataan Division ==
=== Kabataan Essay ===
- First Prize: Alpheus Matthew D. Llantero, "The Adventure of an Alien and the Matalino Kid"
- Second Prize: Pauline Sherice Wee, "Culture Redefined"
- Third Prize: Marielle Fatima B. Tuazon, "The Pursuit of Lucidity"

=== Kabataan Sanaysay ===
- First Prize: No Winner
- Second Prize: Carmel Joy F. Vergara, "Patlang"
- Third Prize: Robyn Therese V. Jocom, "Sungkitin Pabalik ang Nakalipa"
