= 6th PMPC Star Awards for Movies =

1985 Philippine Movie Press Club awards

6th Star Awards for Movies
- Date: 1990
- Hosted by: Gabby Concepcion; Kris Aquino

Highlights
- Best Picture: Pahiram ng Isang Umaga

The 6th PMPC Star Awards for Movies by the Philippine Movie Press Club (PMPC), honored the best Filipino films of 1989. The ceremony took place in 1990. The ceremony award was hosted by Gabby Concepcion and Kris Aquino.

Pahiram ng Isang Umaga won the top awards of the night including Movie of the Year, Movie Director of the Year, Movie Actress of the Year, and Movie Supporting Actor of the Year.

== Winners ==
The following are the winner of the 6th PMPC Star Awards for Movies, covering films released in 1989.

=== Major awards ===
- Movie of the Year – Pahiram Ng Isang Umaga (Regal Films)
- Movie Director of the Year – Ishmael Bernal (Pahiram Ng Isang Umaga)
- Movie Actress of the Year – Vilma Santos (Pahiram Ng Isang Umaga)
- Movie Actor of the Year – Tirso Cruz III (Bilangin Ang Bituin Sa Langit)
- Movie Supporting Actress of the Year – Jaclyn Jose (Macho Dancer)
- Movie Supporting Actor of the Year – Eric Quizon (Pahiram Ng Isang Umaga)
- Movie Child Performer of the Year – Bamba (Kapitan Yagit)
- New Movie Actor of the Year – William Lorenzo (Macho Dancer)
- New Movie Actress of the Year – Ilonah Jean (Sa Kuko Ng Agila)

=== Technical category ===
- Movie Screenplay (Adapted) of the Year – Raquel Villavicencio (Rosenda)
- Movie Screenplay (Original) of the Year – Amado Lacuesta and Ricky Lee (Macho Dancer)
- Movie Theme Song of the Year – Vehnee Saturno ("Mula Sa Puso" from My Darling Domestic)
- Production Designer of the Year – Rey Maliuanag and Freddie Valencia (Bilangin Ang Bituin Sa Langit)
- Editor of the Year – Augusto Salvador (Joe Pring)
- Cinematographer of the Year – Manolo Abaya, Ricardo Jacinto, and Nonong Rasca (Pahiram Ng Isang Umaga)
- Sound Engineer of the Year – Rolly Ruta (Isang Araw, Walang Diyos)
- Musical Scorer of the Year – Willy Cruz (Pahiram Ng Isang Umaga)

=== Special awards ===
- Ulirang Artista Award – Rosa Rosal
- Stuntman of the Year – Rey Solo
- Newsmakers of the Year – Lea Salonga
- Darling of the Press – Fernando Poe, Jr.
- Star of the Night – Susan Roces
