= 12th PMPC Star Awards for Movies =

1985 Philippine Movie Press Club awards

12th Star Awards for Movies
- Date: March 9, 1996
- Site: Henry Lee Irwin Theater, Quezon City
- Hosted by: Richard Gomez; Kris Aquino; Lorna Tolentino

Highlights
- Best Picture: Pahiram ng Isang Umaga

The 12th PMPC Star Awards for Movies by the Philippine Movie Press Club (PMPC), honored the best Filipino films of 1995. The ceremony took place in 1996 in Henry Lee Irwin Theater, Ateneo de Manila University, Quezon City

The ceremony award was hosted by Richard Gomez, Lorna Tolentino and Kris Aquino. The Flor Contemplacion Story won the top awards of the night including Movie of the Year, Movie Director of the Year, Movie Actress of the Year and Movie Supporting Actress of the Year.

== Winners ==
The following are the winners the 12th PMPC Star Awards for Movies, covering films released in 1995.

=== Major awards ===
- Movie of the Year
  - The Flor Contemplacion Story
- Movie Director of the Year
  - Joel Lamangan (The Flor Contemplacion Story)
- Movie Actress of the Year
  - Nora Aunor (The Flor Contemplacion Story)
- Movie Actor of the Year
  - Richard Gomez (Dahas)
- Movie Supporting Actress of the Year
  - Jaclyn Jose (The Flor Contemplacion Story)
- Movie Supporting Actor of the Year
  - Nonie Buencamino (Sibak)
- Movie Child Performer of the Year
  - Angelica Panganiban (Sarah... Ang Munting Prinsesa)
- New Movie Actor of the Year
  - Jason Salcedo for (Baby Love)
- New Movie Actress of the Year
  - Sharmaine Suarez for (Nena)

=== Technical category ===
- Movie Screenplay (Adapted) of the Year
  - Shaira Mella Salvador
- Movie Screenplay (Original) of the Year
  - Olivia Lamasan, Melissa Rosario, and Shaira Mella Salvador
- Production Designer of the Year
  - Manny Morfe
- Editor of the Year
  - Joyce Bernal and Boy Vinarao
- Cinematographer of the Year
  - Romeo Vitug (Inagaw mo lahat sa akin)
- Sound Engineer of the Year
  - Ramon Reyes
- Musical Scorer of the Year
  - Willy Cruz (Pahiram Ng Isang Umaga)
- Movie Theme Song of the Year
  - Vehnee Saturno

=== Special awards ===
- Ulirang Artista Award - Eddie Garcia
- Stuntman of the Year - Eddie Mañalac
- Newsmakers of the Year - Nora Aunor
- Male and Female Star of the Night - Phillip Salvador and Lorna Tolentino
