= 3rd PMPC Star Awards for Movies =

1987 Philippine Movie Press Club awards

3rd Star Awards for Movies
- Date: 1987
- Site: Folk Arts Theater

Highlights
- Best Picture: Unfaithful Wife

The 3rd PMPC Star Awards for Movies by the Philippine Movie Press Club (PMPC), honored the best Filipino films of 1986. The ceremony took place in 1987 in Folk Arts Theater.

Unfaithful Wife won the biggest award of the night including Movie of the Year, Movie Director of the Year and Movie Actor of the Year.

== Winners ==
The following are the winners for the 3rd PMPC Star Awards for Movies, covering films released in 1986.

- Movie of the Year
  - Unfaithful Wife (Regal Films)
- Movie Director of the Year
  - Peque Gallaga (Unfaithful Wife)
- Movie Actress of the Year
  - Jacklyn Jose (Private Show)
- Movie Actor of the Year
  - Joel Torre (Unfaithful Wife)
- Movie Supporting Actress of the Year
  - Nida Blanca (Magdusa Ka!)
- Movie Supporting Actor of the Year
  - Roderick Paulate (Inday Inday Sa Balitaw)

=== Special awards ===
- Star of the First Magnitude - Fernando Poe, Jr
- Ulirang Artista Award - Mary Walter
- Producer of the Year - Regal Films
- Newsmakers of the Year - Richard Gomez and Matet
- Darling of the Press - German Moreno
