= 5th PMPC Star Awards for Movies =

1989 Philippine Movie Press Club awards

5th Star Awards for Movies
- Date: April 15, 1989
- Site: University of Life Theater and Recreational Arena (ULTRA), Pasig City

Highlights
- Best Picture: Itanong Mo sa Buwan

The 5th PMPC Star Awards for Movies by the Philippine Movie Press Club (PMPC), honored the best Filipino films of 1988. The ceremony took place on April 15, 1989 in University of Life Theater and Recreational Arena (ULTRA) in Pasig City.

Itanong Mo sa Buwan won Movie of the Year. Movie Director of the Year. Chito S. Roño and Carlo Siquion Reyna both tied for Movie Director of the Year.

== Winners ==
The following are the winners of the 4th PMPC Star Awards for Movies, covering films released in 1987.

=== Major category ===
- Movie of the Year
  - Itanong Mo Sa Buwan (Double M Productions)
- Movie Directors of the Year
  - Chito Roño (Itanong Mo Sa Buwan)
  - Carlos Siguion-Reyna (Misis Mo Misis Ko)
- Movie Actress of the Year
  - Jaclyn Jose (Itanong Mo Sa Buwan)
- Movie Actor of the Year
  - Ace Vergel (Anak Ng Cabron)
- Movie Supporting Actress of the Year
  - Caridad Sanchez (Kapag Napagod Ang Puso)
- Movie Supporting Actor of the Year
  - Ernie Garcia (Bukas, Sisikat Din Ang Araw)
- Movie Child Performer of the Year
  - Atong Redillas (Ex-Army)
- New Movie Actor of the Year
  - Smokey Manaloto (Tiyanak)
- New Movie Actress of the Year
  - Lara Melissa de Leon (Bukas, Sisikat Din Ang Araw)
- Best Theme Song
  - "Natutulog Pa Ang Diyos"

=== Technical category ===
- Best Sound
  - Joe Climaco (Tiyanak)
- Best Musical Score
  - Willy Cruz (Nagbabagang Luha)
- Best Production Design
  - Don Escudero (Hiwaga)
- Best Editor
  - Abelardo Hulleza (Itanong Mo Sa Buwan)
- Best Cinematographer
  - Manolo Abaya (Misis Mo, Misis Ko)
- Best Screenplay (Adaptation)
  - Orlando Nadres and Gina Marissa Tagasa (Natutulog Pa Ang Diyos)
- Best Screenplay (Original)
  - Ricardo Lee (Sandakot Na Bala)
- Movie Producer of the Year
  - Seiko Films

=== Special awards ===
- Ulirang Artista Award - Mona Lisa
- Darling of the Press - Beverly Vergel
- Newsmaker of the Year - Sharon Cuneta, Gabby Concepcion, and Grace Ibuna
- Stars of the Night - Vilma Santos and Kris Aquino
- Stuntmen of the Year - Rolan Asinas and Reynaldo de Castro
