= 21st PMPC Star Awards for Movies =

2004 Philippine Movie Press Club awards

21st Star Awards for Movies
- Date: March 12, 2005
- Site: Gateway Mall, Cubao, Quezon City

Highlights
- Best Picture: Milan

The 21st PMPC Star Awards for Movies by the Philippine Movie Press Club (PMPC), honored the best Filipino films of 2004. The ceremony took place on March 12, 2005 in Gateway Mall, Araneta in Cubao, Quezon City.

Milan won the top awards including Movie of the Year and Movie Director of the Year.

== Winners ==
The following are the winners of the 21st PMPC Star Awards for Movies, covering films released in 2004.

- Movie of the Year
  - Milan
- Movie Director of the Year
  - Olivia Lamasan (Milan)
- Movie Actor of the Year
  - Dennis Trillo (Aishite Imasu 1941: Mahal Kita)
- Movie Actress of the Year
  - Vilma Santos (Mano Po III: My Love)
- Movie Supporting Actors of the Year
  - Jay Manalo (Aishite Imasu 1941: Mahal Kita)
  - John Lloyd Cruz (Dubai)
- Movie Supporting Actress of the Year
  - Ara Mina' (Minsan Pa)
- New Movie Actor of the Year
  - Dennis Trillo' (Aishite Imasu 1941: Mahal Kita)
- New Movie Actress of the Year
  - Sandara Park (Bcuz of U)
- Movie Child Performer of the Year
  - John Manalo (Feng Shui)
- Movie Theme Song of the Year
  - "Ikaw Lamang" - composed by Ogie Alcasid and interpreted by Gary Valenciano
