= Uninvited =

Uninvited or The Uninvited may refer to:

== Film and television ==
- The Uninvited (1944 film), an American supernatural horror film directed by Lewis Allen
- Uninvited (1987 film), an American science fiction horror film by Greydon Clark
- The Uninvited (1996 film), an American television film directed by Larry Shaw
- Uninvited (1999 film), an Italian thriller directed by Carlo Gabriel Nero
- The Uninvited (2003 film), a South Korean psychological horror film directed by Lee Soo-yeon
- The Uninvited (2008 film), an American horror thriller film by Bob Badway
- The Uninvited (2009 film), an American remake of the 2003 South Korean film A Tale of Two Sisters
- The Uninvited (TV series), a 1997 British science fiction series
- Uninvited (2024 film), a 2024 Filipino psychological thriller film
- The Uninvited (2024 film), a 2024 American comedy drama feature film directed by Nadia Conners

=== Television episodes ===
- "Uninvited" (Stargate SG-1)
- "The Uninvited" (Powers)
- "The Uninvited" (Thunderbirds)
- "The Uninvited" (The Worst Witch)

== Music ==
- "Uninvited" (song), by Alanis Morissette, 1998; covered by Freemasons, 2007
- "Uninvited", song by Ruth Ruth from Laughing Gallery
- The Uninvited (band), an American rock band
- The Uninvited (soundtrack), a soundtrack album from the 2009 film

== Other media ==
- Uninvited (video game), a 1986 point-and-click adventure game
- The Uninvited, a 1997 book by Nick Pope
