= 15th PMPC Star Awards for Movies =

1999 Philippine Movie Press Club awards

15th Star Awards for Movies
- Date: March 13, 1999
- Site: Villamore Hall, UP Diliman; Quezon City
- Hosted by: Vilma Santos; Eric Quizon; Ronnie Ricketts

Highlights
- Best Picture: José Rizal
- Most awards: José Rizal (8)

The 15th PMPC Star Awards for Movies by the Philippine Movie Press Club (PMPC), honored the best Filipino films of 1999. The ceremony took place on March 8, 2003 in Villamore Hall, University of the Philippines, Diliman, Quezon City.

Jose Rizal was the top winner of the night, winning 8 awards including Movie of the Year, Movie Director of the Year, Movie Actor of the Year and Movie Supporting Actor of the Year.

== Winners ==
The following are the winners of the 15th PMPC Star Awards for Movies, covering films released in 1999.

=== Majority category ===
- Movie of the Year
  - José Rizal (GMA Pictures)
- Movie Director of the Year
  - Marilou Diaz-Abaya (José Rizal)
- Movie Actor of the Year
  - Cesar Montano (José Rizal)
- Movie Actresses of the Year
  - Vilma Santos (Bata, Bata... Pa'no Ka Ginawa?)
  - Nida Blanca (Sana Pag-ibig Na)
- Movie Supporting Actor of the Year
  - Jaime Fabregas (José Rizal)
- Movie Supporting Actress of the Year
  - Anita Linda (Ang Babaeng sa Bubugang Lata)
- New Movie Actor of the Year
  - Ryan Eigenmann (Gangland)
- New Movie Actress of the Year
  - Serena Dalrymple (Bata, Bata... Pa'no Ka Ginawa?)
- Movie Child Actor of the Year
  - Carlo Aquino (Bata, Bata, Paano Ka Ginawa?)

=== Technical category ===
- Movie Adapted Screenplay of the Year
  - Ricardo Lee, Jun Lana, and Peter Ong Lim (José Rizal)
- Movie Editor of the Year
  - Jess Navarro and Manet A. Dayrit (José Rizal)
- Movie Production Designer of the Year
  - Leo Abaya (José Rizal)
- Movie Sound Engineering of the Year
  - Albert Michael Idioma (José Rizal)
- Movie Scorer of the Year
  - Nonong Buencamino (José Rizal)

=== Special awards ===
- Darling of the Press: Eric Quizon
- Male and Female Stars of the Night: Albert Martinez and Glydel Mercado
- Fairest Skin of the Night: Bernadette Allyson
