= 4th PMPC Star Awards for Movies =

1985 Philippine Movie Press Club awards

4th Star Awards for Movies
- Date: 1988
- Site: Folk Arts Theater

Highlights
- Best Picture: Saan Nagtatago ang Pag-ibig

The 4th PMPC Star Awards for Movies by the Philippine Movie Press Club (PMPC), honored the best Filipino films of 1987. The ceremony took place in 1988 in Folk Arts Theater.

Saan Nagtatago ang Pag-ibig won the biggest major awards including Movie of the Year and Movie Director of the Year.

== Winners ==
The following are the winners of the 4th PMPC Star Awards for Movies, covering films released in 1987.

- Movie of the Year
  - Saan Nagtatago Ang Pag-ibig? (Viva Films)
- Movie Director of the Year
  - Eddie Garcia (Saan Nagtatago Ang Pag-ibig?)
- Movie Actress of the Year
  - Lorna Tolentino (Maging Akin Ka Lamang)
- Movie Actor of the Year
  - Tonton Gutierrez (Saan Nagtatago Ang Pag-ibig?)
- Movie Supporting Actress of the Year
  - Gloria Romero (Saan Nagtatago Ang Pag-ibig?)
- Movie Supporting Actor of the Year
  - Ronnie Ricketts
- Movie Child Performer of the Year
  - Mel Martinez (Kid, Huwag Kang Susuko)
- Most Promising Male Actor of the Year
  - Eric Quizon
- Most Promising Actress of the Year
  - Aurora Sevilla

=== Special awards ===
- Ulirang Artista Award - Anita Linda
- Movie Producer of the Year - Viva Films
- Newsmakers of the Year - Sharon Cuneta and Gabby Concepcion
- Darling of the Press - Manoling Morato
- Star of the Night - Lorna Tolentino
