= Star Awards for Movies =

Annual Philippine award ceremony

PMPC Star Awards for Movies
- Current: 41st PMPC Star Awards for Movies
- Awarded for: Excellence in Philippine Movies
- Country: Philippines
- Presented by: Philippine Movie Press Club
- First award: 1985; 41 years ago

Star Awards for Movies is an annual awarding ceremony recognizing outstanding films in the Philippines, organized since 1985 by the Philippine Movie Press Club (PMPC).

== History ==
The Philippine Movie Press Club is a non-profit organization of entertainment journalists, writers and film critics which was founded in 1966. The first award for films was inaugurated in 1985, known as Philippine Movie Press Club (PMPC) Star Awards for Movies which honors the exceptional talents of artists in front and behind camera and the recognizing the best Filipino mainstream and independent films annually.

=== Award trophy ===
The Star Awards for Movie trophy is designed by Ernie Pecho. It is shaped as a pair of hands holding a star. This signifies the support given by the movie press to the local stars. Originally the trophy was made of fiberglass that eventually cracked in time. It also produced bubbles that made the trophy look cloudy inside. Later, they also tried wood acacia but this is bad for the environment. Today, the press organization is contented with their glass trophy which of course breaks when not handled properly.

=== Broadcasting ===
Historically, The PMPC Stars Awards for Movies is broadcast on various television networks in a delayed telecast, mainly IBC 13, ABS-CBN, TV5 and A2Z. During the pandemic, the traditional gathering of stars was transitioned online to comply the government directives of social distancing ensuring public safety. The winners accepted their awards from their own homes or other locations. This was observed during the 36th and 37th PMPC Star Awards for Movies which was held in virtual ceremonies.

== Awards of Merit categories ==
=== Current categories ===
- Movie of the Year
- Movie Director of the Year
- Movie Actor of the Year
- Movie Actress of the Year
- Movie Supporting Actor of the Year
- Movie Supporting Actress of the Year
- New Movie Actor of the Year
- New Movie Actress of the Year
- Movie Child Performer of the Year
- Movie Screenwriter of the Year
- Movie Cinematographer of the Year
- Movie Production Designer of the Year
- Movie Editor of the Year
- Movie Sound Engineer of the Year
- Movie Original Theme Song of the Year
- Indie Movie of the Year
- Indie Movie Director of the Year
- Indie Movie Screenwriter of the Year
- Indie Movie Cinematographer of the Year
- Indie Movie Production Designer of the Year
- Indie Movie Editor of the Year
- Indie Movie Sound Engineer of the Year
- Indie Movie Original Theme Song of the Year

=== Special awards ===
- Darling of the Press
- Movie Loveteam of the Year
- Nora Aunor Ulirang Artista Lifetime Achievement Award
- Ulirang Alagad ng Pelikula sa Likod ng Kamera Lifetime Achievement Award

== Rules ==
=== Eligibility period ===
Films must be locally produced and publicly exhibited in theatrical, streaming, or via mainstream media within the calendar year of the eligibility cycle. For instance, the 41st Star Awards held in November 2025 honored films released in 2024, while the 40th honored 2023 releases. Both mainstream films and independent "indie" films are eligible, featuring in separate categories like "Movie of the Year" and "Indie Movie of the Year".

=== Selection process and voting ===
Nominations are selected by members of the Philippine Movie Press Club. In recent years, a partial list of winners for certain technical categories has been revealed prior to the main awards night to build anticipation. The voting process was managed by PMPC members—primarily film critics and journalists—who cast ballots to select nominees and winners, ensuring peer-reviewed recognition without external influence.

== Milestones ==
- The Philippine Movie Press Club has been around for 60 years.
- In 2024, the PMPC Star Awards for Movies has celebrated its 40 years in recognizing the best movies in Philippines cinema.
- The highest awarded movie actress is Vilma Santos, holding the record of 10 wins for Movie Actress of the Year award, followed by Nora Aunor with 7 wins for the same category, while Christopher de Leon and Aga Muhlach have 4 wins for Movie Actor of the Year award respectively.
- In 2024, Dingdong Dantes and Marian Rivera were awarded with Takilya Kung and Queen for their blockbuster movie Rewind with total gross of 924 million pesos at the box office. The following year, Alden Richards and Kathryn Bernardo received the Takilya King and Queen for their movie, Hello, Love, Again having a worldwide gross of 1.6 billion pesos, making it the highest grossing Filipino movie of all time.

== Award ceremonies ==
Year	Ceremony	Venue
1985	1st PMPC Star Awards for Movies	
1986	2nd PMPC Star Awards for Movies	Folk Arts Theater, Manila
1987	3rd PMPC Star Awards for Movies	Folk Arts Theater, Manila
1988	4th PMPC Star Awards for Movies	Folk Arts Theater, Manila
1989	5th PMPC Star Awards for Movies	ULTRA, Pasig
1990	6th PMPC Star Awards for Movies	
1991	7th PMPC Star Awards for Movies	Manila Metropolitan Theater, Manila
1992	8th PMPC Star Awards for Movies	
1993	9th PMPC Star Awards for Movies	
1994	10th PMPC Star Awards for Movies	
1995	11th PMPC Star Awards for Movies	
1996	12th PMPC Star Awards for Movies	Henry Lee Irwin Theatre, Ateneo de Manila University, Quezon City
1997	13th PMPC Star Awards for Movies	
1998	14th PMPC Star Awards for Movies	
1999	15th PMPC Star Awards for Movies	Villamor Hall, University of the Philippines Diliman, Quezon City
2000	16th PMPC Star Awards for Movies	
2001	17th PMPC Star Awards for Movies	
2002	18th PMPC Star Awards for Movies	Villamor Hall, University of the Philippines Diliman, Quezon City
2003	19th PMPC Star Awards for Movies	Villamor Hall, University of the Philippines Diliman, Quezon City
2004	20th PMPC Star Awards for Movies	Teatro Aquinaldo, Camp General Emilio Aguinaldo, Quezon City
2005	21st PMPC Star Awards for Movies	Gateway Mall, Araneta Cubao, Quezon City
2006	22nd PMPC Star Awards for Movies	Grand Ball Hotel, Plaza Sofitel Hotel in Pasay City
2007	23rd PMPC Star Awards for Movies	Villamore Hall, University of the Philippines Diliman in Quezon City.
2008	24th PMPC Star Awards for Movies	Henry Irwin Lee Theater, Ateneo de Manila University in Quezon City.
2009	25th PMPC Star Awards for Movies	Henry Lee Irwin Theatre, Ateneo de Manila University, Quezon City
2010	26th PMPC Star Awards for Movies	Henry Lee Irwin Theatre, Ateneo de Manila University, Quezon City
2011	27th PMPC Star Awards for Movies	Newport Performing Arts Theater, Resorts World Manila, Pasay
2012	28th PMPC Star Awards for Movies	Meralco Theater, Pasig
2013	29th PMPC Star Awards for Movies	AFP Theater, Camp Aguinaldo, Quezon City
2014	30th PMPC Star Awards for Movies	Solaire Resort Hotel
2015	31st PMPC Star Awards for Movies	Solaire Resort & Casino, Parañaque
2016	32nd PMPC Star Awards for Movies	Newport Performing Arts Theater, Resorts World Manila, Pasay
2017	33rd PMPC Star Awards for Movies	Newport Performing Arts Theater, Resorts World Manila, Pasay
2018	34th PMPC Star Awards for Movies	Newport Performing Arts Theater, Resorts World Manila, Pasay
2019	35th PMPC Star Awards for Movies	Newport Performing Arts Theater, Resorts World Manila, Pasay
2021	36th PMPC Star Awards for Movies	Virtual awarding via social media
2022	37th PMPC Star Awards for Movies	Virtual awarding via FlexTV app
2023	38th PMPC Star Awards for Movies	Manila Hotel
2024	39th PMPC Star Awards for Movies	Winford Resort and Casino Manila
2024	40th PMPC Star Awards for Movies	Henry Lee Irwin Theater, Ateneo de Manila University
2025	41st PMPC Star Awards for Movies	Makabagong San Juan Theater

== Controversies ==
=== ENPRESS and the formation of the Golden Screen Awards ===
In 2005, a group of entertainment journalists broke away from the Philippine Movie Press Club (PMPC) to form the Entertainment Press Society (ENPRESS). This split was partly driven by frustrations over the PMPC’s perceived bias and fairness issues in awarding the PMPC Star Awards for Movies. ENPRESS established the Golden Screen Awards, a competing film awards body.

In 2005, PhilStar reported allegations of vote-buying and possible studio influence during the 21st PMPC Star Awards for Movies. The article questioned the fairness of the voting process but did not confirm any investigation or outcome. In 2014, entertainment columnist Jobert Sucaldito accused some PMPC voting members of engaging in vote-buying in connection with the Movie Actor of the Year category at the 30th PMPC Star Awards for Movies. He claimed that he had been assured of support for E.R. Ejercito nominated for (Boy Golden: Shoot to Kill), but alleged that another voting member had lobbied for Vice Ganda, who ultimately won for Girl Boy Bakla Tomboy, and whose victory he described as unexpected. According to Sucaldito, the intended recipient of the award was Joel Torre (nominated for On The Job), and in the absence of any vote-buying, Torre would have won. The PMPC released a statement refuting the allegations. Ejercito also distanced himself from the controversy, stating that he was unaware of any vote-buying. Vice Ganda addressed the allegations on It’s Showtime, saying he would have returned the award if vote-buying had occurred, but otherwise accepted it. He was shown hugging the trophy. Several former PMPC members and veteran entertainment writers commented publicly on the controversy.

== See also ==
- Star Awards for Television
- Star Awards for Music
