= 26th PMPC Star Awards for Movies =

2009 Philippine Movie Press Club awards

26th Star Awards for Movies
- Date: April 24, 2010
- Site: Henry Lee Irwin Theater, Quezon City
- Hosted by: Boy Abunda; Ruffa Gutierrez; Lorna Tolentino

Highlights
- Best Picture: In My Life; Puntod (Indie)

Television coverage
- Network: TV5

The 26th PMPC Star Awards for Movies by the Philippine Movie Press Club (PMPC), honored the best Filipino films of 2009. The ceremony took place on April 24, 2010, in Henry Lee Irwin Theater of Ateneo de Manila University in Quezon City.

The PMPC Star Awards for Movies was hosted by Boy Abunda, Ruffa Gutierrez and Lorna Tolentino. The award ceremony was aired on TV 5 on April 25, 2010.

In My Life won the top awards of the night in including Movie of the Year, Movie Director of the Year, Movie Actor of the Year and Movie Actress of the Year. The Puntod won for Digital Movie of the Year and Digital Movie Director of the Year.

== Winners and nominees ==
The following are the nominations for the 26th PMPC Star Awards for Movies, covering films released in 2009.

Winners are listed first and indicated in bold.

=== Major categories ===
Movie of the Year	Digital Movie of the Year
Winner: **In My Life (Star Cinema)**: Ang Panday (GMA Films and Imus Productions); I Love You Goodbye (Star Cinema); Kimmy Dora (Spring Films); Mano Po 6: My Mother (Regal Entertainment)	Winner: **Puntod (ADC Productions)**: Astig (Cinemalaya Foundation, Boy Abunda and Boy So Productions); Ded Na Si Lolo (APT Entertainment and Directors' Guild of the Phils.); Dinig Sana Kita (Cinemalaya Foundation and Echo & Mirage Media); Dukot (CDP Events and Entertainment Productions and ATD Entertainment)
Movie Director of the Year	Digital Movie Director of the Year
Winner: **Olivia Lamasan (In My Life)**: Mac Alejandre (Ang Panday); Joyce Bernal (Kimmy Dora); Laurice Guillen (I Love You Goodbye); Joel Lamangan (Mano Po 6: My Mother)	Winner: **Cesar Apolinario (Puntod)**: Joel Lamangan (Dukot ); GB Sampedro (Astig); Mike Sandejas (Dinig Sana Kita); Soxie Topacio (Ded Na Si Lolo)
Movie Actor of the Year	Movie Actress of the Year
Winner: **John Lloyd Cruz (In My Life)**: Allen Dizon (Dukot ); Roderick Paulate (Ded Na Si Lolo); Ramon "Bong" Revilla Jr. (Ang Panday); 'Lou Veloso (Colorum)	Winner: **Vilma Santos (In My Life)**: Iza Calzado (Dukot); Sharon Cuneta (Mano Po 6: My Mother); Eugene Domingo (Kimmy Dora); Angelica Panganiban (I Love You Goodbye)
Movie Supporting Actor of the Year	Movie Supporting Actress of the Year
Winner: **Luis Manzano (In My Life)**: Aldred Gatchalian (Bente); Phillip Salvador (Ang Panday); Fanny Serrano (Tulak); Dennis Trillo (Mano Po 6: My Mother)	Winner: **Gloria Diaz (Sagrada Familia)**: Gina Alajar (Dukot); Heart Evangelista (Mano Po 6: My Mother); Zsa Zsa Padilla (Mano Po 6: My Mother); Rhian Ramos (Ang Panday)
New Movie Actor of the Year	New Movie Actress of the Year
Winner: **Romalito Mallari (Dining Sana Kita)**: Enchong Dee (Paano Ko Sasabihin); Zyrus Desamparado (Engkwentro); Joey Paras (Last Supper No. 3); Chase Vega (Agaton And Mindy)	Winner: **Barbie Forteza (Puntod)**: Louise Delos Reyes (Agaton And Mindy); Iren Liel Escaño (Ded Na Si Lolo); Paloma (Pitik Bulag); Maricar Reyes (And I Love You So)
Movie Child Performer of the Year
Winner: **JP Mesde (Tulak)** ànd **Mika Dela Cruz (T2)**: Nash Aguas (Kamoteng Kahoy); Patricia Gayod (Puntod); Robert Villar (Ang Panday)

=== Technical categories ===
Movie Original Screenplay of the Year	Digital Movie Original Screenplay of the Year
Winner: **Raymond Lee, Olivia Lamasan, and Senedy Que (In My Life)**: Laurice Guillen, Mark Meily, and Karen Ramos (I Love You Goodbye); Roy Iglesias (Mano Po 6: My Mother); Chris Martinez (Kimmy Dora); Carmi Raymundo, Norissa Soriano, and Chie Floresca (You Changed My Life)	Winner: **Jerry Gracio (Astig)**: Cesar Apolinario, Melchor Encabo, and Tammy Dantes (Puntod); Charlotte Dianco (Fidel); Mike Sandejas (Dining Sana Kita); Soxie Topacio (Ded Na Si Lolo)
Movie Cinematographer of the Year	Digital Movie Cinematographer of the Year
Winner: **Charlie Peralta (In My Life)**: Lee Meily (I Love You Goodbye); Regiben Romano (Ang Panday); Shayne Sarte (Kimmy Dora); Manuel Teehankee (You Changed My Life)	Winner: **Odyssey Flores (Lola)**: Albert Banzon (Dining Sana Kita); Jeyow Evangelista (Puntod); Odyssey Flores (Astig); Mackie Galvez (Mangatyanan)
Movie Production Designer of the Year	Digital Movie Production Designer of the Year
Winner: **Richard Somes (Ang Panday)**: Adelina Leung and Tony Chiong (Kimmy Dora); Edgar Martin Littaua (I Love You Goodbye); Edgar Martin Littaua (Mano Po 6: My Mother); Elfren Vivar (In My Life)	Winner: **Dante Brillante Mendoza (Lola)**: Cyrus Khan (Astig); Art Maningas and Rommel Espinosa (Puntod); Roland Rubenecia (Dining Sana Kita); Edel Templonuevo (Ded Na Si Lolo)
Movie Editor of the Year	Digital Movie Editor of the Year
Winner: **Theresa Vanessa De Leon (Kimmy Dora)**: Augusto Salvador (Ang Panday); Manet Dayrit (I Love You Goodbye); Marya Ignacio (In My Life); Marya Ignacio (You Changed My Life)	Winner: **Charliebebs Gohetia (Astig)**: Danny Añonuevo (Ded Na Si Lolo); Charliebebs Gohetia (Dukot); Mikael Pestano (Dining Sana Kita); Jonjon Banaag, Arlette Ranojo, and John Bastillo (Puntod)
Movie Musical Scorer of the Year	Digital Movie Musical Scorer of the Year
Winner: **Brian Cua (Kimmy Dora)**: Nonong Buencamino (In My Life); Von De Guzman (Ang Panday); Von De Guzman (I Love You Goodbye); Jessie Lasaten (You Changed My Life)	Winner: **Francis Brew Reyes (Dining Sana Kita)**: Noel Cabangon (Ded Na Si Lolo); Vincent De Jesus (Puntod); Lucien Letabe (Dukot); Jesse Lucas (Astig)
Movie Sound Engineer of the Year	Digital Movie Sound Engineer of the Year
Winner: **Ditoy Aguila (Ang Panday)**: Albert Michael Idioma (Kimmy Dora); Albert Michael Idioma (In My Life); Albert Michael Idioma (I Love You Goodbye); Albert Michael Idioma (T2)	Winner: **Ronald De Asis and Mark Locsin (Dining Sana Kita)**: Ditoy Aguila (Ded Na Si Lolo); Ditoy Aguila, Junel Valencia, and Mark Locsin (Astig); Emmanuelle Clemente (Puntod); Albert Michael Idioma and Addiss Tabong (Lola); Alfredo Ongleo (Dukot)
Movie Original Theme Song of the Year	Digital Movie Original Theme Song of the Year
Winner: **"Tanging Ikaw" (Ang Panday): music, lyrics, and interpretation by Ogie Alcasid**: "Kimmy Dora" (Kimmy Dora): music by Michael Angelo Manalang, lyrics by Emman dela Cruz, and interpretation by Ricci Chan	Winner: **Sana Ako Ay Marining (Dining Sana Kita)**: "Ang Buhay Nga Naman" (Ded Na Si Lolo): music, lyrics, and interpretation by Noel Cabangon; "Astig Ka" (Astig): music by Jojo Espinosa and Edgardo Rustia, lyrics by GB Sampedro and Candy Pangilinan, interpretation by Rodrum; "Gabay Ang Awit" (A Journey Home): music by Janette Ayroso, lyrics by Mia Louise Ramos, interpretation by Jonathan and Denden Beltran, Devin Villacruz, Joy Villacruz, Kimberly Kwok, Wally Ang, Will Tan, and Katherine Dematera

=== Special awards ===
Darling of the Press

Winner: **Donna Villa**

- Toni Gonzaga
- Angel Locsin
- Vicky Morales
- Annabelle Rama

- Nora Aunor Ulirang Artista Lifetime Achievement Award - **Gina Pareño**
- Ulirang Alagad Ng Pelikula Sa Likod Ng Kamera Lifetime Achievement Award - **Director Carlo J. Caparas**
- Male Star of the Night: **Jericho Rosales**
- Female Star of the Night: **Lorna Tolentino**
- Male Face of the Night: **Luis Manzano**
- Female Face of the Night: **Iza Calsado**
- I-White Celebrity of the Night: **Bangs Garcia**
