= 30th PMPC Star Awards for Movies =

2013 Philippine Movie Press Club awards

30th Star Awards for Movies
- Date: March 9, 2014
- Site: Grand Ballroom, Soliare Hotel, Pasay City
- Hosted by: Piolo Pascual; Toni Gonzaga; Maja Salvador; Robi Domingo

Highlights
- Best Picture: On the Job; Badil (Indie)

The 30th PMPC Star Awards for Movies by the Philippine Movie Press Club (PMPC), honored the best Filipino films of 2013. The ceremony took place on March 9, 2014 in Grand Ballroom, Soliare Hotel in Pasay City.

The PMPC Star Awards for Movies was hosted by Piolo Pascual, Toni Gonzaga, Maja Salvador and Robi Domingo. On the Job won for Movie of the Year and Movie Director of the Year, while Badil won for Indie Movie of the Year and Indie Movie Director of the Year.

== Winners and nominees ==
The following are the nominations for the 30th PMPC Star Awards for Movies, covering films released in 2013.

Winners are listed first and indicated in bold.

=== Major categories ===
Movie of the Year	Indie Movie of the Year
Winner: **On the Job** (Reality Entertainment and Star Cinema): 10,000 hours (Philippine Film Studios, Viva Films, and N2 Productions); Dance of the Steel Bars (Portfolio Films and GMA Films); Four Sisters and a Wedding (Star Cinema); It Takes a Man and a Woman (Viva Films and Star Cinema); Shoot to kill: Boy Golden (Scenema Concept International and Viva Films)	Winner: **Badil** - (Waray Republik and Film Development Council of the Philippines): Ang Huling Cha-cha ni Anita - (CineFilipino, Studio 5, and Pixeleyes Multimedia); Ano ang Kulay ng mga Nakalimutang Pangarap? - (LargaVista Entertainment and Film Development Council of the Philippines); Bamboo Flowers - (Productions 56 and Film Development Council of the Philippines); Ekstra - (Cinemalaya Foundation and Quantum Films); Kabisera - (Creative Program, Inc. and Reality Entertainment); Sonata - (My Own Mann Productions, Ruby's Arms Productions, and Film Development Council of the Philippines)
Movie Director of the Year	Indie Movie Director of the Year
Winner: **Erik Matti** - **(On The Job)**: Cesar Apolinario and Marnie Manicad (Dance Of The Steel Bars); Joyce Bernal (10,000 Hours); Cathy Garcia Molina (Four Sisters And A Wedding); Cathy Garcia Molina (It Takes A Man And A Woman); Chito S. Roño (Shoot To Kill: Boy Golden)	Winner: **Chito S. Roño** - **(Badil)**: Sigrid Andrea Bernardo (Ang Huling Cha-Cha Ni Anita); Maryo J. de los Reyes (Bamboo Flowers); Peque Gallaga and Lore Reyes (Sonata); Jeffrey Jeturian (Ekstra); Jose Javier Reyes (Ano Ang Kulay Ng Mga Nakalimutang Pangarap?); Alfonso Torre III (Kabisera)
Movie Actor of the Year	Movie Actress of the Year
Winner: **Vice Ganda** - **(Girl Boy Bakla Tomboy)**: Dingdong Dantes (Dance Of The Steel Bars); Jorge Estregan, Jr.. (Shoot To Kill: Boy Golden); Jake Macapagal (Metro Manila); Robin Padilla (10,000 Hours); Piolo Pascual (On The Job); Joel Torre (On The Job)	Winner: **KC Concepcion** - **(Shoot To Kill: Boy Golden)**: Bea Alonzo (Four Sisters And A Wedding); Nora Aunor (Ang Kuwento Ni Mabuti); Rustica Carpio (Ano Ang Kulay Ng Mga Nakalimutang Pangarap?); Angel Locsin (Four Sisters And A Wedding); Vilma Santos (Ekstra); Lorna Tolentino (Burgos)
Movie Supporting Actor of the Year	Movie Supporting Actress of the Year
Winner: **Joey Marquez** - **(On The Job)**: Art Acuña (Kabisera); Vincent de Jesus (Ekstra); Eddie Garcia (Shoot To Kill: Boy Golden); Spanky Manikan (Bamboo Flowers); Marian Rivera (Ekstra); Joey Paras (Babagwa, The Spider's Lair)	Winner: **Angel Aquino** - **(Ang Huling Cha-Cha Ni Anita)**: Jasmine Curtis-Smith (Transit); Bela Padilla (10,000 Hours); Ruby Ruiz (Ekstra); Coney Reyes (Four Sisters And A Wedding); Gloria Sevilla (Shoot To Kill: Boy Golden); Maricel Soriano (Girl Boy Bakla Tomboy)
New Movie Actor of the Year	New Movie Actress of the Year
Winner: **Vince Tañada** - **(Otso)**: Akihiro Blanco (Mga Alaala Ng Tag-Ulan); Rodjun Cruz (I Luv U Pare Ko); Arkin Del Rosario (Pagari); Mimi Juareza (Quick Change); Ruru Madrid (Bamboo Flowers); Teejay Marquez (Pagari); Kiko Matos (Babagwa, The Spider's Lair)	Winner: **Isabelle Daza** - **(It Takes A Man And A Woman)**: Max Collins (Bamboo Flowers); Jasmine Curtis-Smith (Transit); Meg Imperial (Menor De Edad); Teri Malvar (Ang Huling Cha-Cha Ni Anita); Liza Soberano (Must Be Love); Krystle Valentino (Purok 7)
Movie Child Performer of the Year
Winner: **Ryzza Mae Dizon** - **(My Little Bossings)**: Marc Justine Alvarez (Transit); Adrian Cabido (Lauriana); Miggs Cuaderno (Bamboo Flowers); Lenlen Frial (Ang Huling Cha-Cha Ni Anita); Chino Jalandoni (Sonata); Yogo Singh (Bamboo Flowers)

=== Technical categories ===
Movie Original Screenplay of the Year	Indie Movie Original Screenplay of the Year
Winner: **Erik Matti and Michiko Yamamoto (On The Job)**: Keiko Aquino and Ryllah Berico - (10,000 Hours); Catherine Camarillo and Anthony Guelan - (Shoot To Kill: Boy Golden); Cris Lim - (Dance Of The Steel Bars); Mel Mendoza del Rosario - (Girl Boy Bakla Tomboy); Vanessa Valdez - (Four Sisters And A Wedding)	Winner: **Jose Javier Reyes (Ano Ang Kulay Ng Mga Nakalimutang Pangarap?)**: Aloy Adlawan (Bamboo Flowers); Sigrid Andrea Bernardo (Ang Huling Cha-Cha Ni Anita); Zig Dulay, Antoinette Jadaone, and Jeffrey Jeturian (Ekstra); Hannah Espia and Giancarlo Abrahan (Transit); Wanggo Gallaga (Sonata); Rody Vera (Badil)
Movie Cinematographer of the Year	Indie Movie Cinematographer of the Year
Winner: **RICARDO BUHAY III (On The Job)**: Marissa Floirendo and Gilberto Vistan (10,000 Hours); Carlo Mendoza (Shoot To Kill: Boy Golden); Emman Pascual and Rain Yamson (Dance Of The Steel Bars); Manuel Teehankee (Four Sisters And A Wedding); Manuel Teehankee (It Takes A Man And A Woman)	Winner: **Jun Gonzales** - **(Bamboo Flowers)**: Neil Daza (Badil); ALMA DELA PEÑA (Ang Huling Cha-Cha Ni Anita); Mark Gary (Sonata); Lee Beiones (Ekstra); Lyle Sacris and BER CRUZ (Transit); J.A Tandeña (Kabisera)
Movie Production Designer of the Year	Indie Movie Production Designer of the Year
Winner: **Jun Gonzales** - **(Bamboo Flowers)**: Winston Acuyong (Four Sisters And A Wedding); Joey Luna (10,000 Hours); Arthur Manigas (Dance Of The Steel Bars); Shari Marie Montiague (It Takes A Man And A Woman); Rchard Somes (On The Job)	Winner: **Junjun Montelibano** - **(Sonata)**: Popo Diaz (Ang Huling Cha-Cha Ni Anita); Michael Español and Rashem Gumacal (Kabisera); Ericson Navarro (Ekstra); Bing Santos (Bamboo Flowers); Jayvee Edward Taduran (Badil); Thesa Tang (Transit)
Movie Editor of the Year	Indie Movie Editor of the Year
Winner: **Jay Halili** - **(On The Job)**: Joyce Bernal and Marya Ignacio (10,000 Hours): Charliebibs Gohetis (Dance Of The Steel Bars); Marya Ignacio (Four Sisters And A Wedding); Marya Ignacio (It Takes A Man And A Woman); Carlo Manatad, Jason Chahapay, and Ryan Orduna (Shoot To Kill: Boy Golden)	Winner: **Carlo Francisco Manatad** - **(Badil)**: Lawrence Ang and Kamille Lecio (Ang Huling Cha-Cha Ni Anita); Manet Dayrit (Sonata); Vanessa de Leon (Ano Ang Kulay Ng Mga Nakalimutang Pangarap?); Zig Dulay and Glenn Ituriaga (Ekstra); Sheryl Lopez and BORGY TORRE (Kabisera); Jess Navarro (Bamboo Flower)
Movie Musical Scorer of the Year	Indie Movie Musical Scorer of the Year
Winner:**Carlo Manatad, Jason Cahaoay and Ryan Orduna** - **(Shoot To Kill: Boy Golden)**: Joyce Bernal and Marya Ignacio (10,000 Hours); Charkesbi s Gohetia (Dance Of The Steel Bars); Jay Halili (On The Job); Marya Ignacio (Four Sisters And A Wedding); Marya Ignacio (It Takes A Man And A Woman)	Winner: **Manet Dayrit** - **(Sonata)**: Lawrence Ang and Kamille Lecio (Ang Huling Cha-Cha Ni Anita); Vanessa de Leon (Ano Ang Kulay Ng Mga Nakalimutang Pangarap?); Zig Dulay and Glenn Ituriaga (Ekstra); Sheryll Lopez and Borgy Torre (Kabisera); Carlo Francisco Manatad (Badil); Jess Navarro (Bamboo Flower)
Movie Sound Engineer of the Year	Indie Movie Sound Engineer of the Year
Winner: **Corrine de San Jose** - **(On The Job)**: Aurel Bilbao (Four Sisters And A Wedding); Aurel Bilbao (It Takes A Man And A Woman); Albert Michael Idioma(Dance Of The Steel Bars); Albert Michael Idioma and Addiss Tabong (10,000 Hours); Albert Michael Idioma and Addiss Tabong (Shoot To Kill: Boy Golden)	Winner: **Albert Michael Idioma** - **(Sonata)**: Nioko Aquino (Ang Huling Cha-Cha Ni Anita); Corinne de San Jose and Jedd Dimaguina (Kabisera); Albert Michael Idioma(Bamboo Flowers); Mark Locsin and Mikko Quizon (Transit); Addiss Tabong (Ekstra); Addiss Tabong and Albert Michael Idioma (Badil)
Movie Original Theme Song of the Year	Indie Movie Original Theme Song of the Year
Winner: **"Huwaran ng Kabataan"** (Pedro Calungsod, Batang Martir) -- Lyrics and Music by Emlyn Olfindo-Santos / Arranged by Noel Espenida / Interpreted by Fatima Soriano: "Bakit Hindi ka Crush ng crush mo?" (Bakit Hindi Ka Crush Ng Crush Mo?) – Lyrics and Music by Jungee Marcelo / Interpreted by Zia Quizon; "Hamon ng Buhay" (10,000 Hours) – Composed, Arranged, and Interpreted by Chito Miranda; "Midas" (Boy Golden: Shoot To Kill) – Composed by Abra / Arranged by Sonic State Audio / Interpreted by Abra; "Pahamak na yong Ganda" (Kimmy Dora, Ang Kiyemeng Prequel) – Lyrics and Music by Vincent de Jesus / Interpreted by Yeng Constantino; "Rehas na Bakal" (Dance of the Steel Bars) – Composed, Arranged, and Interpreted by Romano Baesa and Angelo Bitoy of EHP	Winner: **"Sukatin mo ang Mundo ko"** (Jumbo Jericho) – Lyrics by Sandy Es Mariano, Music by Zyruz Imperial,Interpreted by Zyrus Imperial: "Bipolove" (Shift) – Composed and Arranged by Siege Ledesma, Interpreted by Yeng Constantino; "Di Ako Titigil" (Burgos) – Lyrics and Music by Lucien Letaba, Arranged by Melvin Corpin, Interpreted by Beverly Sharon Flordeliz; "Mamahalin kita" (Bamboo Flowers) – Composed and Arranged by RJ Jimenez, Interpreted by Ruru Madrid

=== Special awards ===
Darling of the Press

Winner: **Jerry Yap**

- KC Concepcion
- Luis Manzano
- Vicky Morales
- Piolo Pascual

- NORA AUNOR ULIRANG ARTISTA Lifetime Achievement Award: **Ms Rustica Carpio**
- ULIRANG ALAGAD NG PELIKULA SA LIKOD NG KAMERA Lifetime Achievement Awards: **Ricky Lee and Peque Gallaga**
- Female Celebrity Skin of the Night: **Bela Padilla**
- Female Celebrity Great Shape Award: **Alessandra de Rossi**
