= Philippine Movie Press Club =

Music annual award by Philippine Movie Press Club

- Abbreviation: PMPC
- Formation: 1966; 60 years ago
- Purpose: To uplift and empower the Filipino entertainment industry
- Headquarters: Quezon City
- Location: Manila, Philippines
- Members: 50
- President: Mell Navarro
- Key people: Daniel Villanueva

The Philippine Movie Press Club (PMPC) is a nonprofit organization of journalists who reports on the Philippine entertainment industry founded in 1960. The organization is best known for founding the Star Awards for Movies in 1985, Star Awards for Television in 1987, and the Star Awards for Music in 2009, and organizing these awards ceremonies annually. While these awards are widely considered as the local equivalent of the Golden Globes in the United States, PMPC is an exclusive social club with only about 50 members.

== History ==
The Philippine Movie Press Club (PMPC) is a non-profit organization of entertainment journalists and editors in television, radio, newspapers and magazines. It was founded in 1966 by Daniel Villanueva and Ethel Ramos. The Philippine Movie Press Club is composed of 50 professional multimedia members and practitioners. The leadership of the organization has faced criticisms for its lack of inclusivity and innovation.

The mission of the organization is to uplift and empower the Filipino entertainment industry. The Philippine Movie Press Club honors the exceptional talents of Filipino artists and their outstanding contribution in movies, television and music.

The annual PMPC Star Awards were postponed or delayed in 2020 due to COVID-19 pandemic.

In 2024, the PMPC Star Awards for Movies has celebrated its 40 years in recognizing the best movies in Philippines cinema.

The highest awarded movie actress is Vilma Santos, holding the record of 10 wins for Movie Actress of the Year award, followed by Nora Aunor with 7 wins for the same category, while Christopher de Leon and Aga Muhlach have 4 wins for Movie Actor of the Year award respectively.

In 2024, Dingdong Dantes and Marian Rivera were awarded with Takilya Kung and Queen for their blockbuster movie Rewind with total gross of 924 million pesos at the box office. The next year, Alden Richards and Kathryn Bernardo were awarded with Takilya King and Queen for their movie, Hello, Love, Again having a worldwide gross of 1.6 billion pesos, making it the highest grossing Filipino movie of all time.

In television, Coco Martin is the most awarded dramatic actor with 10 wins, while Maricel Soriano and Coney Reyes won 5 times for Best Drama actress respectively. In comedy, Ogie Alcasid and Michael V. holds the most awarded comedy actors, while Rufa Mae Quinto and Ai-Ai delas Alas are the most awarded comedienne actress in television.

In music, Jed Madela is the most awarded Male Recording Artist of the Year with 5 wins, followed closely by Christian Bautista with 4 wins in the same category. Sarah Geronimo holds the records for the most awarded Female Recording Artist of the Year with 6 awards.

In 2005, a group of entertainment journalists broke away from the Philippine Movie Press Club (PMPC) to form the Entertainment Press Society (ENPRESS). This split was partly driven by frustrations over the PMPC’s perceived bias and fairness issues in awarding the PMPC Star Awards for Movies. ENPRESS established the Golden Screen Awards, a competing film awards body.

== Awards ==
=== Star Awards for Movie ===
In 1985, the Philippine Movie Press Club inaugurated its first awards for movies. The 1984 movie, "Sister Stella L." won for the Movie of the Year, while Mario O'Hara won the Movie Director of the Year for "Bulaklak ng City Jail". Meanwhile, Nora Aunor won the Movie Actress of the Year for "Amerika" and Rudy Fernandez won for Movie Actor of the Year for "Batuigwas , Pasukuin sa Way way".

=== Star Awards for Television ===
In 1987, the Philippine Movie Press Club, together with Airtime Marketing Philippines Inc., founded its first awards for television. The series, "Lovingly Yours, Helen" won for Best Drama Series, while "Hapi House" won for Best Comedy Show. The award ceremony was hosted by Edu Manzano held in Araneta Coliseum, Quezon City. The first PMPC Star Awards for Television ceremony was aired on RPN 9.

=== Star Awards for Music ===
The Philippine Movie Press Club expanded its award to music industry and hosted its first annual music awards in 2009. Prior to nominations, the members of the organization attended music orientation seminars headed by Vehnee Saturno, award-winning composer and music arranger, Vincent de Jesus, award-winning composer and musical director for films and theater, Ryan Manal, music professor and Von Arroyo, Pinoy Dream Academy, voice coach and musical artist.

Prof. Ryan Manal Saturno, music professor and former PMPC President Ernie Pecho, recording company publicist were consultants to the first PMPC Star Awards for Music which took several months of music evaluation and reviews to form the qualified nominees.

The 1st PMPC Star Awards for Music was hosted by Billy Crawford and Toni Gonzaga which was held at SkyDome of SM North Edsa on October 29, 2009. There the album, "Your Universe" by Rico Blanco won for the Album of the Year, while the song, "Ikaw Ang Pangarap" performed by Martin Nievera and composed by Ogie Alcasid won for Song of the Year. Regine Velasquez won the first Female Recording Artist of the Year for her album, "Low Key", while Ogie Alcasid won the Male Recording Artist for his album, "The Great Filipino Songbook".

== Controversy ==
- Golden Screen Awards - a similar award given by an organization establish by members who broke away from PMPC
