= 19th PMPC Star Awards for Movies =

2003 Philippine Movie Press Club awards

19th Star Awards for Movies
- Date: March 8, 2003
- Site: Villamore Hall, UP Diliman; Quezon City

Highlights
- Best Picture: Munting Tinig

The 19th PMPC Star Awards for Movies by the Philippine Movie Press Club (PMPC), honored the best Filipino films of 2002. The ceremony took place in March 8, 2003 in Villamore Hall, University of the Philippines, Diliman, Quezon City.

Munting Tinig won Movie of the Year and Movie Director of the Year.

== Winners ==
The following are the winners of the 3rd PMPC Star Awards for Movies, covering films released in 2002.

=== Majority category ===
- Movie of the Year
  - Munting Tinig
- Movie Director of the Year
  - Gil Portes (Munting Tinig)
- Movie Actor of the Year
  - Yul Servo (Laman)
- Movie Actress of the Year
  - Vilma Santos (Dekada '70)
- Movie Supporting Actor of the Year
  - Piolo Pascual (Dekada '70)
- Movie Supporting Actress of the Year
  - Kris Aquino (Mano Po)
- New Movie Actor of the Year
  - Jordan Herrera (Gamitan)
- New Movie Actress of the Year
  - Nancy Castiglione (I think I'm in love)
- Movie Child Actor of the Year
  - Bryan Homecillo (Munting Tinig)

=== Technical category ===
- Movie Original Screenplay of the cross
  - Adolfo Alix Jr. and Senedy Que
- Movie Adapted Screen of the Year
  - Lualhati Bautista (Dekada '70)
- Movie Cinematography of the Year
  - Odyssey Flores (Laman)
- Movie Editor of the Year
  - George Jarlego
- Movie Sound Engineer of the Year
  - Agimat
- Movie Original Theme Song
  - "Kailangan Kita" by Ogie Alcasid

=== Special awards ===
- Darling of the Press: Onemig Bondoc
