= 23rd PMPC Star Awards for Movies =

2006 Philippine Movie Press Club awards

23rd Star Awards for Movies
- Date: March 23, 2007
- Site: University of Philippines Theater , Quezon City
- Hosted by: Iza Calzado; Dingdong Dantes; Heart Evangelista; Jericho Rosales

Highlights
- Best Picture: Baler; Yaggaw (Indie)

The 23rd PMPC Star Awards for Movies by the Philippine Movie Press Club (PMPC), honored the best Filipino films of 2006. The ceremony took place on March 23, 2007 in University of the Philippines Theater, Quezon City. The award ceremony was aired on March 24, 2007 on IBC-13.

The PMPC Star Awards for Movies was hosted by Iza Calzado, Dingdong Dantes, Heart Evangelista and Jericho Rosales. Kasal, Kasali, Kasalo won Movie of the Year and Movie Director of the Year, while Inang Yaya won for Digital Movie of the Year and Digital Movie Director of the Year.

== Winners and nominees ==
The following are the nominations for the 25th PMPC Star Awards for Movies, covering films released in 2006.

Winners are listed first and indicated in bold.

=== Major categories ===
Movie of the Year	Digital Movie of the Year
Winner: **Kasal, Kasali, Kasalo** (Star Cinema): Don't Give Up On Us (Star Cinema); Kaleldo (Centerstage Productions); Ligalig (CM Films); Pacquiao The Movie (Star Cinema/FLT Films International); You Are The One (Star Cinema)	Winner: **Inang Yaya** (Unitel Pictures): Batad sa Daang Palay (Philippine Center for Performing Arts); Donsol (Bicycle Pictures); Kubrador (MLR Films); Rome and Juliet (I.O.U. One Productions)
Movie Director of the Year	Digital Movie Director of the Year
Winner: Jose Javier Reyes (Kasal, Kasali, Kasalo): Joyce Bernal (Don't Give Up On Us); Joel Lamangan (Pacquiao The Movie); Brillante Mendoza (Kaleldo); Cathy Molina-Garcia (You Are The One); Cesar Montano (Ligalig)	Winner: Pablo Biglang-Awa and Veronica Velasco (Inang Yaya): Adolfo Alix Jr. (Donsol); Benjie Garcia (Batad Sa Daang Palay); Jeffrey Jeturian (Kubrador); Connie Macatuno (Rome And Juliet)
Movie Actor of the Year	Movie Actress of the Year
Winner: **Piolo Pascual** (**Don't Give Up On Us**) and **Jericho Rosales** (**Pacquiao The Movie)**: Ryan Agoncillo (Kasal, Kasali Kasalo); John Arcilla (Compound); Cesar Montano (Ligalig)	Winner: **Judy Ann Santos (Kasal, Kasali, Kasalo)**: Gina Pareño (Kubrador); Nora Aunor (Care Home); Andrea del Rosario (Rome and Juliet); Cherry Pie Picache (Kaleldo); Maricel Soriano (Inang Yaya)
Movie Supporting Actor of the Year	Movie Supporting Actress of the Year
Winner: **Allen Dizon (Twilight Dancers)**: Chokoleit (Zsa Zsa Zaturnnah Ze Moveeh); Johnny Delgado (Ligalig); Jay Manalo (Pacquiao); Ronaldo Valdez (Sukob)	Winner: **Gina Pareño (Kasal, Kasali, Kasalo)**: Pops Fernandez (Zsa Zsa Zaturnnah Ze Moveeh); Liza Lorena (Inang Yaya); Cherry Pie Picache (Twilight Dancers); Jodi Sta. Maria (You Are the One)
New Movie Actor of the Year	New Movie Actress of the Year
Winner:**Sam Milby (You Are The One)**: Jason Abalos (First Day High); Gerald Anderson (First Day High); Christian Bautista (Mano Po 5); Joseph Bitangcol (D' Lucky Ones); Sid Lucero (Donsol); Luis Manzano (All About Love)	Winner: **Maja Salvador (Sukob)**: Kim Chiu (First Day High); Precious Lara Quigaman (Umaaraw, Umuulan); Jackie Rice (Till I Met You); Nene Tamayo (Shake, Rattle & Roll 8 "Yaya" episode)
Movie Child Performer of the Year
Winner: **Tala Santos (Inang Yaya)**: Nash Aguas (Shake, Rattle & Roll 8 "Yaya" episode); Heidi Morata (Batad sa Daang Palay); Eliza Pineda (D' Lucky Ones); Erika Ureta (Inang Yaya)

Note: There was no technical categories nominees listed in any of the link or sources

=== Special awards ===
Darling of the Press

Winner: **Ogie Alcasid**

- Herbert Bautista
- Christine Bersola-Babao
- Toni Gonzaga
- Luis Manzano
- Diether Ocampo
- Regine Velasquez

- Ulirang Artista Lifetime Achievement Award: German Moreno
- Male and Female Star of the Night: Sam Milby and Kim Chiu
- **Male and Female Face of the Nigh**t: Dingdong Dantes and Heart Evangelista
