= 22nd PMPC Star Awards for Movies =

2005 Philippine Movie Press Club awards

22nd Star Awards for Movies
- Date: June 30, 2006
- Site: Grand Ball Hotel, Plaza

Highlights
- Best Picture: Blue Moon; Ang Pagdadalaga ni Maximo Oliveros (Indie)

The 22nd PMPC Star Awards for Movies by the Philippine Movie Press Club (PMPC), honored the best Filipino films of 2005. The ceremony took place on June 30, 2006 in Grand Ball Hotel, Plaza Sofitel Hotel in Pasay City.

Blue Moon won for Movie of the Year and Movie Director of the Year, while Ang Pagdadalaga ni Maximo Oliveros won for Digital Movie of the Year and Digital Movie Director of the Year.

== Winners ==
The following are the winners of the 25th PMPC Star Awards for Movies, covering films released in 2009.

Award	Winner
Movie of the Year	Blue Moon (Regal Films)
Movie Director of the Year	Joel Lamangan (Blue Moon)
Movie Actresses of the Year	Claudine Barretto (Nasaan Ka Man)
Movie Actor of the Year	Aga Muhlach (Dubai)
Movie Supporting Actress of the Year	Gloria Diaz (Nasaan Ka Man)
Movie Supporting Actor of the Year	John Lloyd Cruz (Dubai)
Movie Child Performers of the Year	Elijah Castillo (Pepot Artista)
Movie Child Performers of the Year	Annalyn Bangsi-il (Ang Daan Patungong Kalimugtong)
New Movie Actress of the Year	Ryza Cenon (Lovestruck)
New Movie Actor of the Year	Nathan Lopez (Ang Pagdadalaga ni Maximo Oliveros)
Digital Movie of the Year	Ang Pagdadalaga ni Maximo Oliveros
Digital Movie Director of the Year	Aureaus Solito (Ang Pagdadalaga ni Maximo Oliveros)
Movie Original Screenplay of the Year	Allan Tijamo (Blue Moon)
Movie Cinematographer of the Year	Charlie Peralta (Nasaan Ka Man)
Movie Production Designer of the Year	Joey Luna (Blue Moon)
Movie Musical Scorer of the Year	Vince de Jesus (Let The Love Begin)
Movie Editor of the Year	Marya Ignacio (Nasaan Ka Man)
Movie Sound Engineer of the Year	Addiss Tabong (Nasaan Ka Man)
Movie Original Theme Song of the Year	"Ikaw Lamang from Dubai" interpreted by Gary Valenciano and composed by Ogie Alcasid

=== Special awards ===
• Ulirang Artista - Armida Siguion-Reyna
