= 24th PMPC Star Awards for Movies =

2007 Philippine Movie Press Club awards

24th Star Awards for Movies
- Date: June 27, 2008
- Site: Henry Lee Irwin Theater, Ateneo Quezon City
- Hosted by: Iza Calzado; Piolo Pascual; Kim Chiu

Highlights
- Best Picture: One More Chance; Confessional (Indie)

The 24th PMPC Star Awards for Movies by the Philippine Movie Press Club (PMPC), honored the best Filipino films of 2007. The ceremony took place on June 27, 2008 in Henry Irwin Lee Theater, Ateneo Quezon City. The award ceremony was hosted by Piolo Pascual, Iza Calzado and Kim Chiu.

One More Chance won for Movie of the Year and Movie Director of the Year, while Confessional won for Digital Movie of the Year and Digital Movie Director of the Year.

== Winners and nominees ==
The following are the nominations for the 24th PMPC Star Awards for Movies, covering films released in 2007.

Winners are listed first and indicated in bold.

=== Major categories ===
Movie of the Year	Digital Movie of the Year
Winner: **One More Chance (Star Cinema)**: A Love Story (Star Cinema); Angels: "Daddy's Angel" episode (Eagle Eye Entertainment Productions); Ataul For Rent (Artiste Entertainment Works International); Katas ng Saudi (Maverick Films); Ouija (GMA Films and Viva Films); Sakal, Sakali, Saklolo (Star Cinema)	Winner: **Confessional** **(Creative Programs, Inc. thru Cinema One Originals and Oddfield Productions)**: Pisay (Solito Arts Productions, Philippine Science Foundation, and Pisay Batch ‘86); Selda (Star View Productions); Tambolista (Creative Programs, Inc. thru Cinema One Originals and Bicycle Pictures); Tribu (8 Glasses Productions, Inc.)
Movie Director of the Year	Digital Movie Director of the Year
Winner: **Cathy Garcia-Molina (One More Chance)**: Jose "Dingdong" Dantes III (Angels: "Daddy's Angel" episode); Maryo J. de los Reyes (A Love Story); Topel Lee (Ouija); Jose Javier Reyes (Katas ng Saudi); Jose Javier Reyes (Sakal, Sakali, Saklolo); Neal "Buboy" Tan (Ataul For Rent)	Winner: **Jerrold Tarog** and **Ruel Antipuesto (Confessional)**: Adolfo Alix Jr. (Tambolista); Jim Libiran (Tribu); Auraeus Solita (Pisay); Paolo Villaluna and Ellen Ramos (Selda)
Movie Actor of the Year	Movie Actress of the Year
Winner: **Paolo Contis (Banal)**: John Lloyd Cruz (One More Chance); Ryan Eigenmann (Baliw); Side Lucero (Selda); Aga Muhlach (A Love Story); Piolo Pascual (Paano Kita Iibigin)	Winner: **Ai-Ai delas Alas (Ang Cute ng Ina Mo)**: Bea Alonzo (One More Chance); Cherry Pie Picache (Foster Child); Judy Ann Santos (Sakal, Sakali, Saklolo); Maricel Soriano (A Love Story); Lorna Tolentino (Katas ng Saudi)
Movie Supporting Actor of the Year	Movie Supporting Actress of the Year
Winner: **Emilio Garcia (Selda)**: Publio Briones III (Confessional); Sid Lucero (Tambolista); Jiro Manio (Foster Child); Luis Manzano (Ang Cute ng Ina Mo); Allan Paule (Selda)	Winner: **Eugene Domingo (Pisay)**: Irma Adlawan (Ataul For Rent); Iza Calzado (Ouija); Gloria Diaz (Sakal, Sakali, Saklolo); Ara Mina (Selda); Gina Pareno (Sakal, Sakali, Saklolo); Maja Salvador (One More Chance)
New Movie Actor of the Year	New Movie Actress of the Year
Winner: **Matt Evans (Shake, Rattle and Roll 9)**: Gammy Lopez (Pisay); Zanjoe Marudo (You Got Me); Will Sandejas (Sikil); Jeroold Tarog (Confessional)	Winner: **Lovi Poe (Shake, Rattle and Roll 9)**: Ina Feleo (Endo); Jennica Garcia (Hide and Seek); Rhian Ramos (Ouija); Mayo Suzuki (Telebisyon)
Movie Child Performer of the Year
Winner: **Nash Aguas (Angels: "Daddy's Angels" episode)**: Quintin Alianza (Paano Kita Iibigin); Paulken Bustillo (Paraiso: "Ang Kapatid Kong si Elvis" episode); Elijah Castillo (Pisay); Steven Fermo (Gulong)

=== Technical categories ===
Movie Original Screenplay of the Year	Digital Movie Original Screenplay of the Year
Winner: **Vanessa Valdez (A Love Story)**: Aloy Adlawan (Ouija); Carmi Raymundo and Vaness Valdez (One More Chance); Jose Javier Reyes (Katas ng Saudi); Jose Javier Reyes (Sakal, Sakali, Saklolo); Gina Marissa Tagasa (Angels: "Daddy's Angel" episode)	Winner: **Ramon Ukit (Confessional)**: Romualdo Avellanosa (Sikil); Henry Grageda (Pisay); Ralston Joel Javier (Tirador); Ave Regina Tayag (Tambolista); Paolo Villaluna and Ellen Ramos (Selda)
Movie Cinematographer of the Year	Digital Movie Cinematographer of the Year
Winner: **Manuel Teehankee (One More Chance)**: Rodolfo Aves, Jr. (Sakal, Sakali, Saklolo); Armin Collado and Pao Orendain (Angels: "Daddy's Angel" episode); Neil Daza (Ouija); Marissa Floirendo (The Promise); Gary Gardoce (A Love Story); Jay Linao (Resiklo)	Winner: **Rodolfo Aves, Jr. (Kadin)**: Ruel Antipuesto (Confessional); Alberto Banzon (Tribu); Odyssey Flores (Selda); Charlie Peralta (Pisay); Dan Villegas (Still Life)
Movie Production Designer of the Year	Digital Movie Production Designer of the Year
Winner: **Willie Urbino (Ataul For Rent)**: Nancy Arcega (Sakal, Sakali, Saklolo); Danny Cristobas (Ang Cute ng Ina Mo); Rodell Cruz (Resiklo); Ellen Vibar (One More Chance); Mark Sabas (Ouija)	Winner: **Danny Red (Selda)**: Armi Cacanindin (Tribu); Beans Habal and Harley Alcasid (Tirador); Martin Masadao, Regie Regalado, Dante Garcia, and Endi "Hai" Balbuena (Pisay)
Movie Editor of the Year	Digital Movie Editor of the Year
Winner: **Marya Ignacio (One More Chance)**: Renewin Alano (Katas ng Saudi); Vito Cajili (Sakal, Sakali, Saklolo); Marya Ignacio (Ouija)	Winner: **Pats Ranyo (Confessional)**: Lawrence Ang (Tribu); Kanakan Balintagos and Mikael Pestano (Pisay); ALEKS Castaneda (Tambolista); Soon Lee Mi (Sikil); Paolo Villaluna and Ellen Ramos (Selda)
Movie Musical Scorer of the Year	Digital Movie Musical Scorer of the Year
Winner: **Raul Mitra (Paano Kita Iibigin)**: Vince de Jesus (Ang Cute Ng Ina Mo); Jesse Lasaten (One More Chance); Jessie Lucas (A Love Story); Carmina Robles Cuya (Ouija)	Winner: **Vince de Jesus and Jobin Ballesteros (Pisay)**: Francis de Veyra (Tribu); Pike Ramirez and Veena Ramirez (Selda); Jerrold Tarrog (Confessional)
Movie Sound Engineer of the Year	Digital Movie Sound Engineer of the Year
Winner: **Ditoy Aguila and Rudy Gonzales (Ouija)**: Ditoy Aguila (Resiklo); Albert Michael Idioma (A Love Story); Addiss Tabong (One More Chance)	Winner: **Jerrold Tarrog (Confessional)**: Ditoy Aguila and Mark Locsin (Tambolista); Ronald de Asis and Addiss Tabong (Pisay); Mark Laccay (Tribu); Paolo Villaluna and Ellen Ramos (Selda); Mark Locsin (Baliw)
Movie Original Theme Song of the Year	Digital Movie Original Theme Song of the Year
Winner: "**Paano Kita Iibigin" (Paano Kita Iibigin), composed by Ogie Alcasid / interpreted by Piolo Padcual and Regine Velasquez**: "Chikboy" (Agent X44), composed by Christian Martinez / interpreted by Vhong Navarro; "Cute ng Ina Mo" (Ang Cute ng Ina Mo), composed by Christian Martinez / interpreted by Makisig Morales; "Habambuhay" (Sakal, Sakali, Saklolo), composed by Annabelle Borja and Rolando Borja / interpreted by Yeng Constantino; "Hanggang Sa Dulo" (Batanes), composed by Noel Cabangon / interpreted by Jolina Magdangal; "Sa Aking Pag-uwi" (Katas ng Saudi), composed and interpreted by Davey Langit	Winner: **"Nandito Ako" (Selda), composed by Paolo Villaluna and Pike Ramirez / interpreted by Pike Ramirez and Veena Ramirez**: "Ang Puso Kong Musmos" (Pisay), composed by Carina Evangelista / interpreted by Ebe Dancel; "Nais Ko" (Haw-Ang), composed by Bayang Barrios and Sammy Asuncion / interpreted by Bayang Barrios; "Sundan Mo" (Chopsuey), composed and interpreted by Ron Jancen Solis

=== Special awards ===
- Darling of the Press: Judy Ann Santos
- Star of the Night: Eula Valdez and John Lloyd Cruz
- Face of the Night: Pops Fernandez and Piolo Pascual
- Celebrity Mom of the Night: Dawn Zulueta
- Celebrity Fan of Night: Maja Salvador and Piolo Pascual
- Lifetime Achievement Award: Rudy Fernandez
