= 25th PMPC Star Awards for Movies =

2008 Philippine Movie Press Club awards

25th Star Awards for Movies
- Date: May 28, 2009
- Site: Henry Lee Irwin Theater, Quezon City
- Hosted by: Maricel Soriano; Cesar Montano; Ai-Ai delas Alas

Highlights
- Best Picture: Baler; Yaggaw (Indie)

The 25th PMPC Star Awards for Movies by the Philippine Movie Press Club (PMPC), honored the best Filipino films of 2008. The ceremony took place on May 18, 2009, in Henry Lee Irwin Theater, Ateneo de Manila University, Quezon City.

The PMPC Star Awards for Movies was hosted by Maricel Soriano , Cesar Montano and Ai-Ai delas Alas. Baler won the major awards including Movie of the Year, Movie Director of the Year and Movie Actor of the Year. Yaggaw won for Digital Movie of the Year and Digital Movie Director of the Year.

== Winners and nominees ==
The following are the nominations for the 25th PMPC Star Awards for Movies, covering films released in 2008.

Winners are listed first and indicated in bold.

=== Major categories ===
Movie of the Year	Digital Movie of the Year
Winner: **Baler** (Viva Films and Bida Productions): A Very Special Love (Star Cinema); Caregiver (Star Cinema); Kulam (Regal Entertainment); Magkaibigan (Maverick Films); Ploning (Panoramanila Pictures Co.)	Winner: **Yanggaw** (Creative Programs Inc./Strawdogs Studio Productions): 100 (Martinez Rivera Film Productions); Boses (Erasto Films); Paupahan (ATD Productions); Torotot (Viva Digital); Sisa (Oncam Productions); **Jay** (Pasion Para Pelicula Productions)
Movie Director of the Year	Digital Movie Director of the Year
Winner: **Mark Meily (Baler)**: Dante Nico Garcia (Ploning); Cathy-Garcia Molina (A Very Special Love); Jun Lana (Kulam); Chito Roño (Caregiver)	Winner: **Richard Somes (Yanggaw)**: Crisostomo Juan Andaluz (Sisa); Maryo J. delos Reyes (Torotot); Ellen Ongkeko Marfil (Boses); Chris Martinez (100); Francis Xavier Pasion (Jay); Joven Tan (Paupahan)
Movie Actor of the Year	Movie Actress of the Year
Winner: **Jericho Rosales (Baler)**: Carlo Aquino (Carnivore); John Lloyd Cruz (A Very Special Love); Allen Dizon (Paupahan); Baron Geisler (Jay); Ronnie Lazaro (Yanggaw); Aga Muhlach (When Love Begins)	Winner: **Sharon Cuneta (Caregiver)**: Irma Adlawan (Hubad); Anne Curtis (Baler); Mylene Dizon (100); Gloria Romero (Fuchsia); Judy Ann Santos (Kulam); Jodi Sta Maria (Sisa)
Movie Supporting Actor of the Year	Movie Supporting Actress of the Year
Winner: Emilio Garcia (Walang Kawala) and **German Moreno (Paupahan)**: Ricky Davao (Boses); Baron Geisler (Baler); Phillip Salvador (Baler)	Winner: **Snooky Serna (Paupahan)**: Tetchie Agbayani (Yanggaw); Shamaine Buencamino (Ang Lihim ni Antonio); Gloria Romero (Paupahan); Tessie Tomas (100)
New Movie Actor of the Year	New Movie Actress of the Year
Winner:**Sherwin Ordoñez (Kurap)**: Julian Duque (Boses); Bojong Fernandez (Ploning); Kenjie Garcia (Ang Lihim ni Antonio); Carlo Guevara (Desperadas 2); Prince Stefan (Shake, Rattle & Roll X, "Class Picture" episode)	Winner: **KC Concepcion (For The First Time)**: Precious Adona (Torotot); Ynna Asistio (Concerto); Niña Jose (Shake, Rattle & Roll X, "Class Picture" episode); Chariz Solomon (My Best Friend's Girlfriend)
Movie Child Performer of the Year
Winner: **Tala Santos (Boses)**: Ashley Rhein Arca (Kurap); Sharlene San Pedro (Kulam); Robert Villar (Shake, Rattle & Roll X, "Nieves" episode)

=== Technical categories ===
Movie Original Screenplay of the Year	Indie Movie Original Screenplay of the Year
Winner: **Roy Iglesias (Baler)**: Raz Sobida-Dela Torre (A Very Special Love); Dante Nico Garcia and Benjamin Lingan (Ploning); Jun Lana, Elmer Gatchalian and Renato Custodio (Kulam); "Chris Martinez (Caregiver)	Winner: **Dennis Evangelista (Paupahan)**: Chris Martinez (100); Froi Medina and Rody Vera (Boses); Francis Xavier Pasion (Jay); Richard Somes (Yanggaw)
Movie Cinematographer of the Year	Digital Movie Cinematographer of the Year
Winner: **Lee MeiIy (Baler)**: Eli Balce (Caregiver); Charlie S. Peralta (Ploning); Manuel Teehankee (A Very Special Love); Moises Zee (Kulam)	Winner: **Hermann Claravall and Lyle Sacris (Yanggaw)**: Albert Banzon (Sisa); Larry Manda (100); Lee Meily (Lovebirds); Romy Vitug (Paupahan)
Movie Production Designer of the Year	Digital Movie Production Designer of the Year
Winner: **Aped F. Santos (Baler)**: Nancy Arcega (A Very Special Love); Raymond Bajarias (Caregiver); Raymund Jorge Fernandez (Ploning); Mario Lipit & Edgar Martin Littaua (Kulam)	Winner: **Michael Espanol, Donald Camon, and Rashel Gumacal (Yanggaw)**: Rene Clarido (Paupahan); Bianca Gonzales (Boses); Aby Jamague-Rivera (100); Joy Puntawe (Jay)
Movie Editor of the Year	Digital Movie Editor of the Year
Winner: **Danny Anonuevo (Baler)**: Danny Añonuevo (Ploning); Manet Dayrit (Caregiver); Marya Ignacio (A Very Special Love); Ria De Guzman, Renewin Alano, and Mikael Angelo Pestano (Kulam)	Winner: **Francis Xavier Pasion, Kats Serrano, and Chuck Gutierrez (Jay)**: R.L Soriano (Paupahan); Orlean Tan (Boses); Borgy Torre (Yanggaw); Ike Veneracion (100)
Movie Musical Scorer of the Year	Digital Movie Musical Scorer of the Year
Winner: **Jessie Lasaten (Ploning)**: Carmina Robles-Cuya (Caregiver); Vincent De Jesus (Baler); Jessie Lasaten (A Very Special Love); Jesse Lucas (When Love Begins)	Winner: **Jourdann Petalver (Boses)**: Tirso Ripoll (Carnivore); Bryan Chua (100); Eric Narvaez (Paupahan); Von de Guzman (Yanggaw)
Movie Sound Engineer of the Year	Digital Movie Sound Engineer of the Year
Winner: **Ditoy Aguila (Baler)**: Bebet Casas (Kulam); Mike Idioma (Ploning); Albert Michael Idioma (Caregiver); Adiss Tabong (A Very Special Love)	Winner: **Jethro Joaquin and Ronald de Asis (Concerto)**: Allan Hilado and Orlean Tan (Boses); Joey Santos (Carnivore); Jethro Joaquin and Mac Vasquez (100)
Movie Original Theme Song of the Year	Digital Movie Original Theme Song of the Year
Winner: **"Ngayon, Bukas, at Kailanman" (Baler): Louie Ocampo, composer; Eddie Gallardo, lyricist; Sarah Geronimo, interpreter**: "Paalam" (Caregiver): Louie Ocampo, composer-lyricist; Sharon Cuneta, interpreter; "Bestfriend's Girlfriend" (My Best Friend's Girlfriend): Introvoys, composer-lyricist and interpreter	Winner: **"Sangandaan" (Paupahan): Joven Tan, composer-lyricist; Jan Nieto, interpreter**: "Hardest Part" (100): Ricci Chan, composer-lyricist; "Naroon Ka" (Fuchsia): Von De Guzman, composer-lyricist; Springfields, interpreter); "Puerto Jam" (Carnivore): Razorback, composer, lyricist, and interpreter

=== Special awards ===
Darling of the Press

Winner: **Herbert Bautista**

- Dingdong Dantes
- Angel Locsin
- Edu Manzano
- Luis Manzano
- Vicky Morales
- Isko Moreno

- Ulirang Artista Lifetime Achievement Award: Governor Vilma Santos-Recto
- Award for Cinematic Excellence in Filipino Animation: Dayo and Urduja
- Special Citation: Himala
- Male & Female Stars of the Night: John Lloyd Cruz and Sarah Geronimo
