= List of awards and nominations received by Sharon Cuneta =

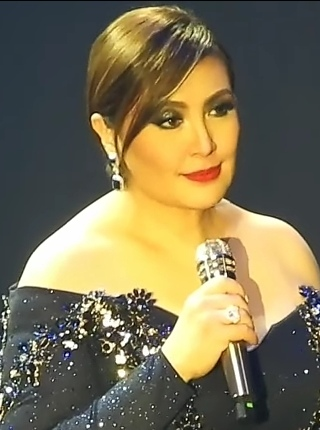
Cuneta in 2019

Sharon Cuneta is a Filipino actress and singer who has received numerous accolades for her work in film, music and television. She began her career as a recording artist and has since expanded to acting and has presented various television variety shows. Cuneta was the fifth actress to achieve Grandslam for her role in the family drama Madrasta, winning the Best Actress award across all major-award-giving bodies in the Philippines.

Cuneta has received sixteen FAMAS Award for Best Actress nominations, winning two for Dapat Ka Bang Mahalin (1984) and Madrasta. She has won her first and only Gawad Urian for Best Actress for her role in Madrasta. She has earned nine Luna Award for Best Actress nominations, winning two for her roles in Sa Hirap at Ginhawa (1984) and Madrasta. Cuneta has also earned thirteen nominations for Star Award for Movie Actress of the Year, winning two for her performances in Madrasta and Caregiver (2008). She has won nine Box Office Entertainment Award for Box Office Queen, becoming the second woman after Vilma Santos to be inducted into the awards hall of fame in 1990. In 2004, Cuneta won Best Actress at the Brussels International Film Festival for her role in the comedy drama Crying Ladies.

For her musical work, Cuneta was honored with a Lifetime Achievement Award by the Philippine Association of the Record Industry in 2002 and MOR Pinoy Music Awards in 2015. She became the first recipient of the Myx Magna Award in 2006 and was also awarded by the Star Awards for Music with the Natatanging Alagad ng Musika in 2012 for her contributions to Philippine music industry. As a presenter, she was highly commended in 2006 at the Asian Television Awards in the category Best Entertainment Presenter for her self-titled talk show Sharon. She has also received twelve Star Awards for Best Female TV Host nominations, winning five for The Sharon Cuneta Show (1988, 1993, 1994, 1995 & 1996).

== Awards and nominations ==
=== Asian Television Awards ===
Year	Category	Work	Result	Ref.
2006	Best Entertainment Presenter	Sharon	Highly Commended	

=== Brussels International Film Festival ===
Year	Category	Work	Result	Ref.
2004	Best Actress	Crying Ladies	Won	

=== FAMAS Awards ===
Year	Category	Work	Result	Ref.
2024	Best Actress	Family of Two	Nominated	
2022	Best Actress	Revirginized	Nominated	
2010	Best Actress	Mano Po 6: A Mother's Love	Nominated	
2010	Golden Artist Award	Herself	Won	
2009	Best Actress	Caregiver	Nominated	
2004	Best Actress	Crying Ladies	Nominated	
2003	Best Actress	Magkapatid	Nominated	
1997	Best Actress	Madrasta	Won	
1996	Best Actress	Minsan Pa: Kahit Konting Pagtingin 2	Nominated	
1994	Best Actress	Ikaw	Nominated	
1993	Best Actress	Tayong Dalawa	Nominated	
1992	Best Actress	Una Kang Naging Akin	Nominated	
1991	Best Actress	Biktima	Nominated	
1990	Best Actress	Babangon Ako't Dudurugin Kita	Nominated	
1988	Best Actress	Pasan Ko Ang Daigdig	Nominated	
1987	Best Actress	Sana'y Wala Nang Wakas	Nominated	
1985	Best Actress	Dapat Kabang Mahalin	Won	

=== Gawad Urian Awards ===
Year	Category	Work	Result	Ref.
1998	Best Actress	Nang Iniwan Mo Ako	Nominated	
1997	Best Actress	Madrasta	Won	
1993	Best Actress	Tayong Dalawa	Nominated	

=== GMMSF Box Office Entertainment Awards ===
Year	Category	Work	Result	Ref.
2024	Concert of the Year	Dear Heart Concert	Won	
2018	All-Time Favorite Actress	Unexpectedly Yours	Won	
2009	Mother's Day Box Office Queen	Caregiver	Won	
2009	Film Actress of the Year	Caregiver	Won	
2007	Outstanding Achievement by a Female Recording Artist	Isn't It Romantic?	Won	
1997	Box Office Queen	Madrasta	Won	
1994	Box Office Queen	Kung Kailangan Mo Ako	Won	
1993	Box Office Queen	Pangako Sa'yo	Won	
1992	Box Office Queen	Maging Sino Ka Man	Won	
1991	Box Office Queen	Box Office Hall of Fame	Won	
1990	Box Office Queen	Babangon Ako't Dudurugin Kita	Won	
1988	Box Office Queen	Jack 'N Jill	Won	
1989	Box Office Queen of RP Movies	Herself	Won	
1987	Box Office Queen of RP Movies	Herself	Won	
1986	Box Office Queen of RP Movies	Herself	Won	
1985	Box Office Queen of RP Movies	Herself	Won	
1984	Box Office Queen of RP Movies	Herself	Won	
1983-1984	Miss RP Movies	Herself	Won	
1982-1983	Miss RP Movies	Herself	Won	
1981-1982	Popular Teenage Queen of RP Movies	Herself	Won	

=== PMPC Star Awards for Movies ===
Year	Category	Work	Result	Ref.
2024	Movie Actress of the Year	Family of Two	Nominated	
2023	Movie Actress of the Year	Revirginized	Nominated	
2018	Movie Actress of the Year	Unexpectedly Yours	Nominated	
2010	Movie Actress of the Year	Mano Po 6: A Mother's Love	Nominated	
2009	Movie Actress of the Year	Caregiver	Won	
2009	Movie Theme Song of the Year	Caregiver	Nominated	
2004	Dekada Award	Herself	Won	
2004	Movie Actress of the Year	Crying Ladies	Nominated	
1998	Movie Actress of the Year	Nang Iniwan Mo Ako	Nominated	
1997	Movie Actress of the Year	Madrasta	Won	
1994	Movie Actress of the Year	Ikaw	Nominated	
1993	Movie Actress of the Year	Tayong Dalawa	Nominated	
1991	Movie Actress of the Year	Bakit Ikaw Pa Rin?	Nominated	
1990	Movie Actress of the Year	3 Mukha ng Pag-ibig	Nominated	
1987	Movie Actress of the Year	Sanay Wala Nang Wakas	Nominated	

=== Awit Awards ===
Year	Category	Work	Result	Ref.
2010	Best Inspirational/Religious Recording	Saranggola sa Ulan	Nominated	
2007	Best Selling Album	Isn't It Romantic	Nominated	
2006	Performance by a Duet	Nandito Ako	Nominated	
2004	Christmas Recording	Paskong Nagdaan	Nominated	
2002	Best Performance by a Female Recording Artist	Herself	Nominated	
2002	Dangal Ng Musikang Pilipino Award	Herself	Won	
1993	Best Performance by a Female Recording Artist	Ngayon at Kailanman	Won	

=== PMPC Star Awards for Television ===
Year	Category	Work	Result	Ref.
2014	Best Musical Variety Show	The Mega and the Songwriter	Nominated	
2014	Best Female TV Host	The Mega and the Songwriter	Nominated	
2012	Best Reality/Game Show Host	The Biggest Loser Pinoy Edition	Nominated	
2012	Best Showbiz Oriented/Celebrity Talk Show	Sharon: Kasama Mo, Kapatid	Nominated	
2011	Best Talent Search Program	Star Power: Sharon's Search for the Next Female Pop Superstar	Nominated	
2011	Best Talent Search Program Host	Star Power: Sharon's Search for the Next Female Pop Superstar	Nominated	
2011	Best Musical Variety Show	Sharon	Nominated	
2011	Best Female TV Host	Sharon	Nominated	
2010	Best Female TV Host	Sharon	Nominated	
2010	Best Musical Variety Show	Sharon	Nominated	
2009	Best Celebrity Talk Show	Sharon	Nominated	
2009	Best Female TV Host	Sharon	Nominated	
2008	Best Celebrity Talk Show	Sharon	Nominated	
2007	Best Celebrity Talk Show	Sharon	Nominated	
2007	Best Celebrity Talk Show Host	Sharon	Nominated	
2006	Best Celebrity Talk Show Host	Sharon	Nominated	
2006	Best Celebrity Talk Show	Sharon	Nominated	
2004	Best Celebrity Talk Show	Sharon	Nominated	
2004	Best Celebrity Talk Show Host	Sharon	Nominated	
2003	Best Celebrity Talk Show Host	Sharon	Nominated	
2003	Best Celebrity Talk Show	Sharon	Nominated	
1996	Best Female TV Host	The Sharon Cuneta Show	Won	
1995	Best Female TV Host	The Sharon Cuneta Show	Won	
1994	Best Female TV Host	The Sharon Cuneta Show	Won	
1993	Best Female TV Host	The Sharon Cuneta Show	Won	
1993	Best Musical Variety Show	The Sharon Cuneta Show	Won	
1992	Best Musical Variety Show	The Sharon Cuneta Show	Nominated	
1992	Best Female TV Host	The Sharon Cuneta Show	Nominated	
1991	Best Musical Variety Show	The Sharon Cuneta Show	Nominated	
1991	Best Female TV Host	The Sharon Cuneta Show	Nominated	
1990	Best Female TV Host	The Sharon Cuneta Show	Won	
1988	Best Female TV Host	The Sharon Cuneta Show	Nominated	
1988	Best Musical Variety Show	The Sharon Cuneta Show	Nominated	

=== PMPC Star Awards for Music ===
Year	Category	Work	Result	Ref.
2020	Album of the Year	Megastar	Nominated	
2020	Female Recording Artist of the Year	Hanggang Dulo	Nominated	
2020	Concert of the Year	Sharon: My 40 Years	Nominated	
2020	Female Concert Performer of the Year	Sharon: My 40 Years	Nominated	
2012	Natatanging Alagad Ng Musika	Herself	Won	

=== Metro Manila Film Festival ===
Year	Category	Work	Result	Ref.
2024	Best Actress	¸"Family of Two"	nominated	
2009	Best Actress	Mano Po 6: A Mother's Love	Won	
2003	Best Actress	Crying Ladies	Nominated	
2002	Best Actress	MagkapatidManila Film Festival	Won	

=== Luna Awards ===
Year	Category	Work	Result	Ref.
2009	Best Actress	Caregiver	Nominated	
2003	Best Actress	Magkapatid	Nominated	
1998	Best Actress	Nang Iniwan Mo Ako	Nominated	
1997	Best Actress	Madrasta	Won	
1993	Best Actress	Tayong Dalawa	Nominated	
1992	Best Actress	Una Kang Naging Akin	Nominated	
1991	Best Actress	Biktima	Nominated	
1990	Best Actress	Babangon Ako't Dudurugin Kita	Nominated	
1987	Best Actress	Sanay Wala Nang Wakas	Nominated	
1985	Best Actress	Sa Hirap at Ginhawa	Won	

=== Philippine Association of the Record Industry ===
Year	Certification	Album/single	Result	Ref.
2002	Lifetime Achievement Award	Herself	Won	

=== The EDDYS ===
Year	Category	Work	Result	Ref.
2022	Icon Award	Herself	Won	
2018	Best Actress	Unexpectedly Yours	Nominated	

=== Cinemalaya Philippine Independent Film Festival ===
Year	Category	Work	Result	Ref.
2017	Best Actress	Ang Pamilyang Hindi Lumuluha	Nominated	

=== Catholic Mass Media Awards ===
Year	Category	Work	Result	Ref.
2007	Best Entertainment Program	Sharon	Won	

=== Golden Screen TV Awards ===
Year	Category	Work	Result	Ref.
2015	Dolphy Lifetime Achievement Award	Herself	Won	
2013	Outstanding Adapted Reality/Competition Program	The Biggest Loser Pinoy Edition	Nominated	
2013	Outstanding Adapted Reality/Competition Program Host	The Biggest Loser Pinoy Edition	Nominated	
2013	Outstanding Celebrity Talk Program	Sharon: Kasama Mo, Kapatid	Nominated	
2013	Outstanding Celebrity Talk Program Host	Sharon: Kasama Mo, Kapatid	Nominated	
2011	Outstanding Lifestyle Program Host	Sharon at Home	Won	
2011	Outstanding Lifestyle Program	Sharon at Home	Won	

Golden Screen Awards
Year	Organization	Award	Nominated work	Result
2011	Golden Screen Awards	Plaque of Recognition (Movie Icons of Our Time)	Herself	Won
2010	Golden Screen Awards	Best Performance by an Actress in a Leading Role—Drama	Mano Po 6: A Mother's Love	Nominated
2009	Golden Screen Awards	Best Performance by an Actress in a Leading Role—Drama	Caregiver	Nominated

== Other accolades ==
Industry Awards
Year	Organization	Award	Nominated work	Result
2023	People Asia's Women of Style and Substance		Herself	Won
2023	Gawad Dangal Awards	Outstanding Movie Queen/Singer Performer of the Year	Herself	Won
2022	Gawad Banyuhay Awards	Gloria Sevilla Award	Herself	Won
2022	GEMS Awards	Best Performance in a Lead Role (Female) in a Film	Revirginized	Won
2021	VP Choice Awards	Movie of the Year	Revirginized	Nominated
2020	YouTube	Silver Play Button	Herself	Won
2019	Sine Sandaan ng Film Development Council of the Philippines	Luminaries of Philippine Cinema (Loveteam category) with Gabby Conception	Herself	Won
2019	Viva Icon 2019	VIVA Icon Award	Herself	Won
2018	ALTA Media Icon Awards	Iconic Awardee for Broadcast, Film and Music	Herself	Won
2018	Edukcircle Awards	Most Influential Film Actresses of the Year	Herself	Won
2017	Edukcircle Awards	Lifetime Achievement Award	Herself	Won
2017	Anak TV Awards	Makabata Hall of Fame Award	Herself	Won
2015	MOR Pinoy Music Awards	Lifetime Achievement Award	Herself	Won
2018	HISTORY	History Maker Award	Herself	Won
2012	Yahoo! OMG! Awards	Major Impact Award	Herself	Nominated
2009	Cinema One Originals Film Festival	Legend Award	Herself	Won
2009	Gawad Tanglaw Awards	Best Celebrity Talk Show	Sharon	Won
2009	Gawad Genio Awards	Best Film Actress	Madrasta	Won
2009	Cinema One's Kinse Viewers Choice Awards	King and Queen of Hearts	Herself	Nominated
2009	Cinema One's Kinse Viewers Choice Awards	Most Memorable Movie Theme Song — "Pangarap na Bituin"	Herself	Nominated
2008	Fil-am Visionary Awards	Legend Award for Acting	Herself	Won
2006	Myx Music Awards	Myx Magna Award	Herself	Won
2010	Gawad Pasado Awards	Pinakapasadong Aktres	Mano Po 6: A Mother's Love	Nominated
2008	Gawad Pasado Awards	Pinakapasadong Aktres	Caregiver	Won
2008	ASAP Platinum Circle Awards	Platinum Circle Female Awardees	Herself	Won
2006	ASAP Platinum Circle Awards	Elite Platinum Circle Awardee	Herself	Won
2004	Junior Chamber International Philippines	The Outstanding Young Men (and Women) of the Philippines (TOYM) Honoree	Herself	Won
2002	Patnubay ng Sining at Kalinangan Medal	City of Manila Awardee	Herself	Won
2002	Philippine Web Awards	People's Choice Award for Best Celebrity Website	Herself	Won
2001	Philippine Web Awards	People's Choice Award for Best Celebrity Website	Herself	Won
1999	Philippine Web Awards	People's Choice Award for Best Celebrity Website	Herself	Won
2001	Women's Week Film Festival	Hallmark Women Achiever Awardee (Entertainment category)	Herself	Won
2001	National Mother's Day and Father's Day Foundation Inc. & Ulirang Ina Awards Committee	Ulirang Ina Award	Herself	Won
2002	FORKS! Magazine's Reader's Choice Awards	Female Star Quality	Herself	Won
2001	FORKS! Magazine's Reader's Choice Awards	Female Star Quality	Herself	Won
2000	KBP Golden Dove Awards	Best Talk Show Host	Sharon	Won
1998	Metro Star Search	Gintong Tinig Award	Herself	Won
1991	Tinning Awards (NPCP)	Most Outstanding Recording Artists	Herself	Won
1992	Greater Metro Manila Theater Association	Box Office Record Award (with Robin Padilla)	Kahit Konting Pagtingin	Won
1992	Movie Magazine's Film Review Awards	Best Actress	Tayong Dalawa	Won
2003	People's Choice Awards	Best Actress	Crying Ladies	Won
1997	People's Choice Awards	Best Actress	Madrasta	Won
1984	KOMOPB Awards	Best Actress	Dapat Ka Bang Mahalin	Won
2012	Aliw Awards	Best Collaboration in a Concert (with Martin Nievera)	Once in a Lifetime	Nominated
2022	Aliw Awards	Best Major Concert (with Regine Velasquez)	Iconic	Won
2019	Aliw Awards	Best Collaboration in a Concert (with Regine Velasquez)	Iconic	Won
2018	Aliw Awards	Best Major Concert (Female)	Sharon at 40	Nominated
2010	Aliw Awards	Best Major Concert (Female)	Mega Drama	Nominated
2007	Aliw Awards	Best Major Concert (Female)	My Mega Valentine	Nominated
2006	Aliw Awards	Best Major Concert (Female)		Won
1985	Aliw Awards	Most Outstanding Female Concert Hall Act	Sharon Solo With The Boys	Won
1984	Cecil Awards	Best Female Vocal Performance	To Love Again	Nominated
1980	BAMCI Promotions Awards	Jukebox Princess	Herself	Won
1992	Pinoy Music Awards	Best Performance by a Female Artist	Kung Kailangan Mo Ako	

== Listicles ==
Year	Organization	List	Result
1999	Manila Standard	Top 10 Actresses of the Decade	Included
1999	Moviestar Magazine	Top 15 Brightest Stars in Philippine Showbiz (No. 1)	Included
1999	Pulse Asia, Inc.	Most Admired Filipino Men & Women (No. 4)	Included
2004	Directors' Guild of the Philippines Inc. (DGPI)	The 15 Best Filipino Actresses of All Time	Included
2004	BizNewsAsia	Top 100 Most Powerful and Influential Filipinos (No. 20)	Included
2004	Asia's Under-50 Movers and Shakers by A.C. Nielsen	Most Effective Product Endorser	Included
2006	S Magazine	Philippine Cinema's 15 Best Actresses of All Time	Included
2007	Philippine Entertainment Portal (PEP.ph)	Top Celebrity Endorsers of 2007 (No. 3)	Included
2008	Yes! Magazine	2008 YES! List of the Top 20 Endorsers	Included
2009	Manila Standard	Top 10 Celebrity Endorsers of 2009 (No. 1)	Included
2010	Spot PH	Top 10 Most In-Demand Celebrity Endorsers (No. 9)	Included
2015	Bureau of Internal Revenue	Top 500 taxpayers in the Philippines (No. 19)	Included
2022	Tatler Asia	Queens of Philippine Cinema	Included
2023	Rappler	Iconic Filipino movie lines that have made their mark through the years (Madrasta, 1996)	Included
