= Sharon Cuneta filmography =

- Film: 53
- Television series: 16

Sharon Cuneta is a multi-awarded Filipino singer, actress and TV host dubbed "The Megastar" of Philippine entertainment and fondly called "Mega" or "Shawie" by fans and people from the entertainment industry.

Her success in the movies (53 starring roles & guest appearances in the movies, television (16 shows) and recording (40 albums) make her one of the most successful Filipina actresses. She has also worked the field of advertising, where she is the highest paid Filipino celebrity endorser, including endorsement of fastfood chains, banks, make-up, electronics, ice cream, telecommunication company.

Cuneta holds the record of having the most number of Box Office Queen of RP Movies title (9 titles from 1984 to 1996). She was elevated to the Box Office Hall of Fame in 1990. She was also hailed as the Top Female Box Office Star of 1985 "Bida sa Takilya" given during the FAMAS Awards, 1986, for the success of her movie, Bituing Walang Ningning and was also awarded the 1991 Box Office Record Award for the movie Maging Sino Ka Man (with co-star Robin Padilla as co-awardee) given by the Greater Metro Manila Theater Association.

== Television ==
Year	Title	Role
1979–1980	C. U. T. E. (Call Us Two for Entertainment)	Co-host
1978–1986	GMA Supershow	Co-host
1982-1983	Okey Sha!	Sha Mismo
1983–1984; 2023–present	Eat Bulaga!	Co-host/Guest/Performer
1986–1997	The Sharon Cuneta Show	Host
1998–2010	Sharon	Host
2010–2011	Star Power	Host
2011	The Biggest Loser Pinoy Edition	Host
2012–2013	Sharon: Kasama Mo, Kapatid	Host
2013–2014	Madam Chairman	Elizabeth "Bebeth" De Guzman
2015–present	Your Face Sounds Familiar	Jury
2015–present	ASAP	Herself
2016	The Voice Kids	coach from season 3
2017	The Voice Teens	coach from the start of the season
2021–2022	FPJ's Ang Probinsyano	First Lady Aurora Guillermo-Hidalgo
2024–2025	Saving Grace	Miranda Valdez
2026	Honor Thy Mother	Diana Aragon

== Film ==
Year	Title	Role	Remarks
1978	Balatkayo	As herself (Special Guest Appearance)	Watch on YouTube - Sharon Cuneta @ 12
1981	Dear Heart	April	Cuneta's first starring role in a movie; 1981 Popular Teenage Queen of RP Movies, GMMSF
1981	P.S. I Love You	Kristine	First feature film of Viva Films
1982	My Only Love	Cindy	1982 Ms. RP Movies, GMMSF
1982	Forgive and Forget	Sandra	
1982	Cross My Heart	Jenny	
1983	Friends In Love	Sarah	1983 Ms. RP Movies, GMMSF
1983	To Love Again	Rafaela/Raffy	
1984	Dapat Ka Bang Mahalin?	Myrna	Best Actress, FAMAS; Best Actress, KOMOPB
1984	Bukas Luluhod ang mga Tala	Rebecca Rios	1984 Box Office Queen of RP Movies, GMMSF
1984	The Best of Sharon and Gabby	Herself	Includes exclusive footage of Cuneta and Concepcion's wedding
1984	Sa Hirap at Ginhawa	Cecilia	Best Actress, Film Academy of the Philippines
1985	Bituing Walang Ningning	Dorina Pineda	1985 Box Office Queen of RP Movies, GMMSF; Top Female Box Office Star of 1985, FAMAS
1985	Pati Ba Pintig Ng Puso?	Jenna	
1985	Kailan Sasabihing Mahal Kita?	Ara	
1986	Sana'y Wala Nang Wakas	Bianca Eleazar	1986 Box Office Queen of RP Movies, GMMSF; Best Actress nominee, PMPC Star Awards for Movies; Best Actress nominee, FAMAS; Best Actress nominee, Film Academy of the Philippines
1986	Nakagapos na Puso	Elaine	
1986	Captain Barbell	Darna (Special Participation)	
1987	Kung Aagawin Mo ang Lahat sa Akin	Maureen Andrada	
1987	Jack & Jill	Jack/Jackielou	1987 Box Office Queen of RP Movies, GMMSF
1987	Pasan Ko ang Daigdig	Guadalupe Velez	Best Actress nominee, FAMAS
1987	Walang Karugtong ang Nakaraan	Malou	
1988	Buy One, Take One	Salve	First movie with Richard Gomez.
1988	Jack and Jill sa Amerika	Jack/Jackielou	
1989	3 Mukha ng Pag-ibig	Liza / Mara / Sandra	Best Actress nominee, PMPC Star Awards for Movies
1989	Kahit Wala Ka Na	Irene	
1989	Babangon Ako't Dudurugin Kita	Salve	Best Actress nominee, FAMAS; Best Actress nominee, Film Academy of the Philippines; 1989 Box Office Queen of RP Movies, GMMSF; First movie with Bembol Roco and Hilda Koronel.
1989	Oras-Oras, Araw-Araw	Jessa Rodriguez	First movie with Eric Quizon.
1990	Kahit Konting Pagtingin	Georgia	Best Actress nominee, FAMAS; First movie with Fernando Poe Jr.
1990	Bakit Ikaw Pa Rin?	Jenny	Best Actress nominee, PMPC Star Awards for Movies
1990	Biktima	Becca	Best Actress nominee, Film Academy of the Philippines
1991	Maging Sino Ka Man	Monique/Digna	First movie with Robin Padilla; 1991 Box Office Record Award, Greater Metro Manila Theater Association
1991	Una Kang Naging Akin	Diyosa	Best Actress nominee, FAMAS; Best Actress nominee, Film Academy of the Philippines
1991	Kaputol ng Isang Awit	Sarah Montessa e.g. later Rivera	First movie with her now brother-in-law Gary Valenciano, Mark Gil, and Amy Perez.
1992	Pangako Sa 'Yo	Clarissa	1992 Box-Office Queen of RP Movies, GMMSF
1992	Tayong Dalawa	Carol	Last movie with Gabby Concepcion, reunion movie with Eric Quizon.; Best Actress, Movie Magazine's Film Review Awards; Best Actress nominee, PMPC Star Awards for Movies; Best Actress nominee, FAMAS; Best Actress nominee, Film Academy of the Philippines; Best Actress nominee, Gawad Urian
1992	Ngayon at Kailanman	Ayra Noche	
1993	Kung Kailangan Mo Ako	Diana	1993 Box Office Queen of RP Movies, GMMSF
1993	Ikaw	Anna	First movie with Ariel Rivera.; Best Actress Nominee, FAMAS; Best Actress Nominee, PMPC Star Awards for Movies
1993	Di Na Natuto	Carlota	Reunion movie with Robin Padilla.
1994	Kapantay ay Langit	Odette Yuson	
1994	Megamol	Cora/Corazon Corpuz Arevalo	First movie with Andrew E.
1995	The Lilian Velez Story	Lilian Velez	First movie with Cesar Montano, Joel Torre, Gina Alajar, Donita Rose, and Sharon's companion on The Sharon Cuneta Show Agot Isidro.
1995	Minsan Pa (Kahit Konting Pagtingin 2)	Georgia	Best Actress nominee, FAMAS
1996	Madrasta	Mariel	First movie with Star Cinema for being appearing and serving in ABS-CBN, owner of Star Cinema. Reunion movie with Christopher de Leon and with Eula Valdez from Bukas Luluhod ang mga Tala and Buy One, Take One and with Teresa Loyzaga from Kung Kailangan Mo Ako. First movie with Zsa Zsa Padilla, Patrick Garcia, Camille Prats, Claudine Barretto, and Rico Yan.; Grandslam Best Actress winner of 1996; Best Actress, PMPC Star Awards for Movies; Best Actress, FAMAS; Best Actress, Film Academy of the Philippines; Best Actress, People's Choice Awards; Best Actress, Gawad Urian; 1996 Box Office Queen of RP Movies, GMMSF
1996	Ten Little Indians	Rose Valdez	
1997	Wala Nang Iibigin Pang Iba	Sarah Castillo	
1997	Nang Iniwan Mo Ako	Amy	Best Actress nominee, PMPC Star Awards for Movies; Best Actress nominee, FAMAS; Best Actress nominee, Film Academy of the Philippines; Best Actress nominee, Gawad Urian; First movie with Albert Martinez and Maritoni Fernandez
2000	Minsan, Minahal Kita	Dianne Nepomuceno	Reunion movie with Richard Gomez and Edu Manzano produced by Star Cinema. First movie with Carmina Villarroel and Marvin Agustin.
2001	Pagdating ng Panahon	Lynette	Viva Films' 20th anniversary presentation, her third reunion movie with Robin Padilla.
2002	Magkapatid	Dr. Cita Reyes	First movie with Judy Ann Santos; Best Actress, Manila Film Festival
2003	Walang Kapalit	Joane Rustia	
2003	Kung Ako na Lang Sana	Emmy	First movie with Aga Muhlach
2003	Crying Ladies	Stella Mate	First movie entry in the Metro Manila Film Festival.; Reunion movie with Hilda Koronel from Babangon Ako't Dudurugin Kita and Eric Quizon from Oras-Oras, Araw-Araw and Tayong Dalawa.; Best Actress, People's Choice Award for Best Actress, Metro Manila Film Festival; Best Actress, Brussels International Independent Film Festival
2006	Penguin, Penguin, Paano Ka Ginawa?	Narrator (voice only)	
2008	Caregiver	Sarah Gonzales	First film after a 5-year hiatus on the big screen; first movie with Star Cinema after 5 years.; First movie with John Estrada, John Manalo, and Mickey Ferriols.; Earned ₱ 139 million in the box office; Mother's Day Box Office Queen, GMMSF.; Film Actress of the Year, GMMSF; Movie Actress of the Year, PMPC Star Awards for Movies; Pinakapasadong Aktres, Pasado Awards
2008	Iskul Bukol: 20 years After	Sharon Escalera (Special Participation)	
2009	BFF (Best Friends Forever)	Honey	First movie with Ai-Ai delas Alas.; Earned ₱102,500,000 in the box office
2009	OMG (Oh, My Girl!)	Guada (Special Participation)	First movie with Ogie Alcasid, reunion movie with Judy Ann Santos.
2009	Mano Po 6: A Mother's Love	Melinda Uy	First movie with Regal Entertainment in her 30 years in show business and for the upcoming 50th anniversary of Regal. Reunion movie with Christopher de Leon and Zsa Zsa Padilla from Madrasta and with John Manalo from Caregiver. First movie with veteran actors Kris Aquino and Zoren Legaspi (both homegrown Regal talents) and Cuneta's cousin Ciara Sotto.; Best Actress, 2009 Metro Manila Film Festival
2010	Noy	Herself/Cameo	
2017	Ang Pamilyang Hindi Lumuluha	Cora	This is her first independent film and Cinemalaya film.; First film after another 7-year hiatus on the big screen.
2017	Unexpectedly Yours	Patty	Marks as her reunion movie with Robin Padilla with Star Cinema, their first comedy movie. First movie with blockbuster director Cathy Garcia-Molina; Earned ₱249 Million in the Box Office
2018	Three Words to Forever	Cristy Andrada	Reunion movie with Richard Gomez. First movie with Kathryn Bernardo
2019	Kuwaresma	Rebecca	First horror movie
2021	Revirginized	Carmela	First movie with Rosanna Roces and Cristina Gonzales, and first time to work with homegrown actor from ABS-CBN who is managed by Viva Artists Agency Marco Gumabao. Reunion movie with Puppy Love, Albert Martinez (his reunion movie with Cristina Gonzales after Kahit May Mahal Ka Ng Iba). First movie with Viva Films after 18 years, and also part of VIVA Films 40th Anniversary presentation
2023	Family of Two	Maricar	

== Film production ==
Year	Title	Starring	Remarks
2005	La Visa Loca	Robin Padilla	*First movie as a producer.
2017	Ang Pamilyang Hindi Lumuluha	Sharon Cuneta	*First Cinemalaya Film of Sharon Cuneta.
