= List of Sharon Cuneta live performances =

Filipino artist live performances

Sharon Cuneta live performances
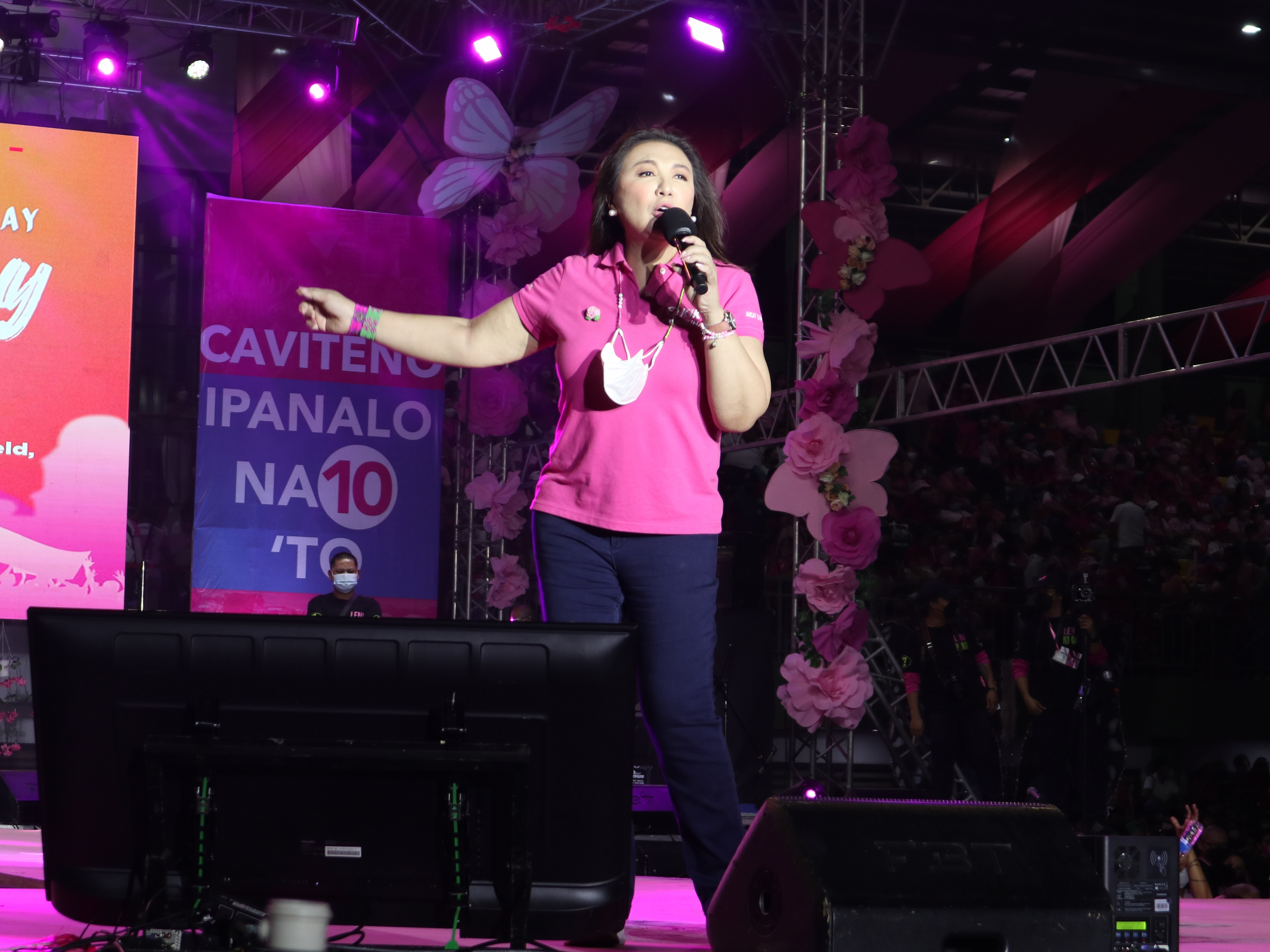
- Cuneta in 2022
- Headlining concerts: 35
- Co-headlining concerts: 5
- Digital concerts: 1

Filipino singer Sharon Cuneta has headlined concerts both in the Philippines and abroad. Regarded as one of the most successful Filipino entertainers of all time, she has performed across different parts of the world— America, the Middle East, Oceania and Asia. She staged her first major two-night concert "Sharon, Solo with the Boys" at the Araneta Coliseum.

Cuneta has performed before packed houses at Hong Kong Coliseum, Shrine Auditorium, and Sydney Coliseum Theatre. She received the Honorary Key to the City of Los Angeles from the city's former mayor, Tom Bradley for being the first Filipino artist to perform at the Shrine Auditorium in Los Angeles, California. She has a poster enshrined at the Hall of Fame of the MGM Grand Garden Arena and was the first Filipino musical act stage a concert at the Hong Kong Coliseum. In her home country, she has headlined multiple sold-out concerts at the Araneta Coliseum and has performed with global artists such as Julio Iglesias, Michael Buble, Jim Brickman, Angela Bofill, Billy Preston and Andy Lau.

== Headlining concerts ==
Legend
{{{1}}}	Indicates that the concert was held abroad

List of concerts, with dates, venues and number of performances
Year	Title	Details	Notes	Ref.
1984	Sharon, Solo with the Boys	Date: July 20 & 21, Friday and Saturday; Venue: Araneta Coliseum	Two-night sold-out concert at the Big Dome	
1985	Sharon... Year VII	Date: August 17, Saturday; Venue: Folk Arts Theater	For the benefit of Cultural Planners Association of the Philippines	
1987	Circus! Circus!	Venue: SM North Edsa		
1988	Sharon Cuneta US Concert Tour '88	Date: First US concert tour	Cuneta has a poster enshrined in The Shrine's Hall of Fame next to stars Michael Jackson and Barbra Streisand.	
1990	Sharon Cuneta Concert Tour '90	Date: June 15 & 16; Venue: Araneta Coliseum	The concert tour also visited Cebu (July 20 & 21), Davao (July 28) & Cagayan de Oro (August 3)	
1993	Cuneta sa Cuneta: Sharon Cuneta	Date: September 17 & 18; Venue: Cuneta Astrodome	For the benefit of the chosen children foundation	
1996	Mega Up Close	Date: August 9, 16, 23, 30 & September 5; Venue: Music Museum		
1997	A Valentine Wish	Date: February 13, 1997; Venue: Westin Philippine Plaza	Special guest: Basil Valdez	
2001	One Night Only	Date: August 28, Tuesday; Venue: Greenbelt	Free concert as a special treat for her fans who have continually supported anything Cuneta undertook the past twenty years.	
2002	Mega Concert Live in HK	Date: May 12, Sunday; Venue: Hong Kong Coliseum	"It was a record-breaking concert, the first time a Filipino musical concert attracted a capacity-crowd at the Hong Kong Coliseum, which is one of the biggest arenas in Hong Kong."	
2002	The Mega Event	Date: August 16 & 17; Venue: Araneta Coliseum	25th anniversary concert; Each show was attended by over 20,000 fans	
2005	Mega Concert Tour 2005	Date: Visited six key cities in the US— Florida, New York City, Atlantic City, San Diego, Los Angeles and Nevada	"Sharon was the first Filipino artist to break SRO records at both the Shrine Auditorium and the MGM Grand Garden Arena"	
2006	My Mega Valentine	Date: February 12, Sunday; Venue: Araneta Coliseum		
2006	My Mega Valentine : The Repeat	Date: March 31, Friday; Venue: Araneta Coliseum	The attendance of the concert was estimated to be around 70%.	
2007	Sharon Live at Island Cove	Date: January 20, Saturday; Venue: Island Cove Concert Grounds		
2007	My Mega Valentine 2	Date: February 10, Saturday; Venue: Araneta Coliseum		
2008	Sharon 2k8	Date: January 10, Friday; Venue: Araneta Coliseum		
2008	Mega Thirty	Date: August 8, Friday; Venue: Araneta Coliseum		
2009	Songs of My Heart: The Mega Birthday Concert	Date: January 9, Friday; Venue: Araneta Coliseum		
2009	Mega Thirty Tour 2009	US Concert Tour		
2010	Mega Drama	Date: August 7, Friday; Venue: Araneta Coliseum		
2010	Mega Euro Tour 2010	Date: September 18 & 19; Venue: Rainier III Auditorium and Schutzenhaus Albisgutli	Her shows in Zurich and Monaco were sold-out.	
2011	Mega 2011 Sharon Cuneta Concert	Date: January 11, Tuesday; Venue: Araneta Coliseum		
2011	Mega Up Close 2011	Date: June 25 & July 3; US Concert Tour; Venue: Pechanga Theater & Silver Legacy Resort Casino	Sold-out show in Temecula, California	
2011	Mega Europe Tour 2011	Date: September 24 to October 1; Visited six cities in Europe	Special guest: Angeline Quinto	
2012	Mega Concert Tour Australia 2012	Date: August 10 & 11; Concert tour		
2013	Sharon Cuneta: Christmas In Dubai	Date: December 6; Venue: Dubai Wonderland Theme and Water Park		
2013	Sharon Cuneta: Christmas In Milan, Italy	Date: December 8; Venue: Orchestra i Pomeriggi Musicali	A benefit event in aid of TES, PHILS. & PGBI	
2014	Mega USA Casino Circuit Tour 2014	Date: June 14, 20 & 22	Visited 3 key cities in California—Temecula, Santa Ynez & Lincoln	
2016	Sharon at Solaire	Date: October 15 & 22, Saturday; Venue: Theater at Solaire		
2017	Sharon Cuneta Mega US Tour 2017	Date: June 16 to July 9; Visited New York City and four cities in California within its first and second leg	First show of the tour at the Chumash Casino was sold-out	
2018	Sharon: 40th Mega Philippine Tour	Date: January 13 to August 3; Concert tour	Shows in Cebu, Bacolod, Bohol and Davao were all sold-out.	
2018	Sharon: My 40 Years	Date: September 28, Friday; Venue: Araneta Coliseum	Sold-out concert	
2019	My 40 Years: Sharon (US & Canada Tour)	Date: February 23 to March 30; Concert Tour (8 shows)	Musical director: Louie Ocampo; Visited Vancouver, Winnipeg, Las Vegas, Pala, Jacksonville, Toronto & Glendale.	
2022	Love Sharon	Date: October 15 to 19; Australian concert tour	Cuneta became the first Filipino artist to perform at Sydney Coliseum Theatre at West HQ Rooty Hill	

== Co-headlining concerts ==
Legend
{{{1}}}	Indicates that the concert was held abroad

List of concerts, with dates, venues and number of performances
Year	Title	Details	Co-headliner	Ref.
2012	Once in a Lifetime	Date: February 13, Friday; Venue: Araneta Coliseum	with Martin Nievera	
2015	Sharon sings Valera	Date: November 22, Sunday Venue: City National Grove of Anaheim	with Rey Valera	
2019	Iconic	Date: October 18, Friday; Venue: Araneta Coliseum; No. of shows: 16 (12 of which are abroad)	with Regine Velasquez	
2023	Harmonies in Life	Date: May 5, Friday; Venue: InLife's Tanghalang Haribon; Private concert	with Louie Ocampo	
2023	Dear Heart, The Concert	Date: October 27, Friday; Venue: Mall of Asia Arena	with Gabby Concepcion	

== Digital concerts ==
List of concerts, with dates, venues and number of performances
Year	Title	Details	Notes	Ref.
2020	Sharon: Love and Music, A Mothers Day Special	Date: May 10, Friday; Online fundraising concert	The concert raised over ₱2 million "in donations for ABS-CBN's Pantawid Ng Pag-Ibig campaign, dedicated to COVID-19 frontliners and people directly affected by the Enhanced Community Quarantine."	

== Guest appearances ==
Legend
{{{1}}}	Indicates that the concert was held abroad

Year	Title	Details	Notes	Ref.
1984	Gary A-Live! by Gary Valenciano	Date: Venue: Araneta Coliseum		
2002	Jim Brickman: Simple Things by Jim Brickman	Date: March 15 & 16; Venue: PICC Plenary Hall	Cuneta was Brickman's personal choice as guest in his concert.	
2007	When Erik Met Rufa the Repeat by Rufa Mae Quinto & Erik Santos	Date: February 16; Venue: Aliw Theater	Cuneta was the surprise guest of the show; Sold-out concert	
2010	Heart of Gold by Julio Iglesias	Date: March 20, Saturday; Venue: Araneta Coliseum	Proceeds from the show went to the victims of tropical storm Ondoy.	
2010	Akin ang Tronong 'To by Ai-Ai delas Alas	Date: November 19, Friday Venue: Araneta Coliseum		
2023	Composer Ka Lang by Louie Ocampo	Date: February 4 & 5 Venue: Solaire Resort & Casino	Cuneta was one of the guest performers	

== See also ==
- Sharon Cuneta discography
