= Sharon Cuneta discography =

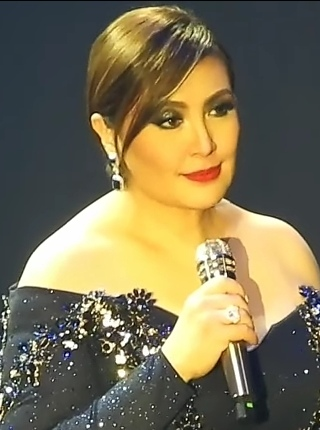
- Cuneta performing “Love Again” in 2019
- Studio albums: 20
- Soundtrack albums: 11
- Live albums: 1
- Compilation albums: 10
- Singles: 54
- Video albums: 8

This is the discography of Sharon Cuneta, a Filipino actress, singer and TV host. She is regarded as one of the best-selling artist and biggest names in Philippine entertainment. Her album, Isn't It Romantic?, became the second album in Philippine history to be awarded with a Diamond record certification (250,000). History Asia called her as the "Philippines reigning diva". Throughout her career, she has released multi-platinum records including: Movie Theme Songs (3× Platinum), Sharon sings Valera (3× Platinum), For Broken Hearts Only (2× Platinum) and Isn't It Romantic? (Diamond), including Si Sharon at si Canseco (Platinum) and When I Love (Platinum).

With a career spanning of over 40 years, Cuneta is recognized as a legend in Philippine music industry. She was presented with VIVA Icon Award for her invaluable contribution to television, film, recording, and concerts among others. MOR Pinoy Music Awards honored her with the OPM Lifetime Achievement Award, which was given only to Filipino music icons who have exemplar contribution to the music industry. The Board of Directors of the Philippine Association of Recording Industry honored Cuneta with the Dangal Ng Musikang Pilipino Award (Lifetime Achievement Award) at the 15th Awit Awards ceremony. She was also the first recipient of the prestigious Myx Magna Award, recognising artists with an exemplary contribution in the Philippine music industry.

Her first exposure in Philippine music was in 1978 when at 12 years old, recorded the song "Mr. DJ". The song became a success and garnered her as 'DJ's Pet', which was the name also of her first album. Other hit albums followed and more movie soundtracks were sung by her. A duet was recorded in 2001, "In Your Eyes" with Hong Kong singer Andy Lao, composed by Jim Brickman. "All I Ever Want" reached No. 20 on the Top 30 charts of HMV, a music store in Hong Kong. "In Your Eyes" debuted at No. 8 on the charts of RTHK, Hong Kong's No. 1 radio. In 2002, at age 36, Cuneta was given a Lifetime Achievement Award by the Board of Directors of the Phil. Association of Recording Industry via the Dangal ng Musikang Pilipino Award on her 25th year in the music industry.

== Albums ==
=== Studio albums ===
Year	Title	Certification
1978	DJ's Pet: Released: 1978; Label: Vicor; Formats: LP, CD, cassette	
1979	Sharon: Released: 1979; Label: Vicor; Formats: LP, CD, cassette	
1980	Sharon Cuneta: Released: 1980; Label: Vicor; Formats: LP, CD, cassette	
1982	Sixteen: Studio album; Released: 1982; Label: Vicor; Formats: LP, CD, cassette	
1983	Sharon and Love: Released: 1983; Label: Vicor; Formats: LP, CD, cassette	
1984	Sshhh: Released: 1984; Label: Vicor; Formats: LP, CD, cassette	
1989	For Broken Hearts Only: Released: 1989; Label: Viva; Formats: LP, CD, cassette	PARI: 2× Platinum (80,000)
1990	The Sharon Cuneta Christmas Album: Released: 1990; Label: Viva; Formats: LP, CD, cassette	
1991	Sharon Sings Valera: Released: 1991; Label: Viva; Formats: LP, CD, cassette	PARI: 3× Platinum (120,000)
1992	Si Sharon At Si Canseco: Released: 1992; Label: Viva; Formats: LP, CD, cassette	PARI: Platinum (40,000)
1993	Ikaw At Ako: Released: 1993; Label: Viva; Formats: LP, CD, cassette	
1996	The Other Side of Me: Released: 1996; Label: Viva; Formats: CD, Cassette	
1999	When I Love: Released: December 1999; Label: Viva; Formats: LP, CD, cassette	PARI: Platinum
2000	Nothing I Want More: Released: February 2000; Label: Viva; Formats: CD, Cassette	
2001	All I Ever Want: Released: 2001; Label: Viva; Formats: CD, Cassette	
2003	Paskong Nagdaan: Released: 2003; Label: Viva; Formats: CD, Cassette	
2005	Sharon Sings Alcasid: Released: 2005; Label: Sony BMG; Formats: CD, digital download	
2006	Isn't It Romantic?: Released: 2006; Label: Sony BMG; Formats: LP, CD, digital download	PARI: Diamond
2007	Isn't It Romantic? 2: Released: 2007; Label: Sony BMG; Formats: CD, digital download	
2009	Children's Rhymes and Lullabies: Released: 2009; Label: Sony BMG; Formats: CD, digital download	
2009	Musika at Pag-ibig: Released: 2009; Label: Sony BMG; Formats: CD, digital download	
2018	Megastar: Released: October 2018; Label: Star Music; Formats: CD, digital download	

=== Live albums ===
Year	Title	Certification
1997	Mega Up close: The Live Album: Released: 1997; Label: Viva; Formats: Cassette, CD	

=== Soundtrack albums ===
Year	Title	Certification
1981	P.S. I Love You: Released: 1981; Label: Vicor; Formats: LP, CD, cassette	
1984	Songs from Bukas Luluhod Ang Mga Tala: Released: 1984; Label: Vicor; Formats: LP, CD, cassette	
1985	Bituing Walang Ningning: Released: 1985; Label: Vicor; Formats: LP, CD, cassette	
1986	Sana'y Wala Nang Wakas: Released: 1986; Label: Vicor; Formats: LP, CD, cassette	
1991	Maging Sino Ka Man: Released: 1991; Label: Viva; Formats: LP, CD, cassette	
1991	Kaputol Ng Isang Awit: Released: 1991; Label: Viva; Formats: LP, CD, cassette	
1994	Kapantay Ay Langit: Released: 1994; Label: Viva; Formats: LP, CD, cassette	
1994	Megamol: Released: 1994; Label: Viva; Formats: LP, CD, cassette	
1995	Minsan Pa (Kahit Konting Pagtingin 2) Released: 1995: Label: Viva; Formats: CD, Cassette	
2000	Minsan, Minahal Kita: Released: February 2000; Label: Viva; Formats: CD, Cassette	
2003	Kung Ako Na Lang Sana: Released: 2003; Label: Star Records; Formats: CD, Cassette	

=== Compilation albums ===
Year	Title	Certification
1981	High School: Released: 1981; Label: Vicor; Formats: LP, CD, cassette	
1990	Movie Theme Songs: Released: 1990; Label: Viva; Formats: LP, CD, cassette	PARI: 3× Platinum
1994	Sana'y Wala Nang Wakas (Special Collectors Edition): Released: 1994; Label: Vicor; Formats: CD, Cassette	
1994	The Best of Sharon Cuneta: Released: 1994; Label: Viva; Formats: CD, Cassette	
1994	Sharon Sings Duets: Released: 1994; Label: Viva; Formats: CD, Cassette	
1998	The Best of Love Duets (Viva Collection Forever): Released: 1998; Label: Viva; Formats: CD, Cassette	
1998	The Greatest Hits – Sharon at 20: Released: 1998; Label: Viva; Formats: CD, Cassette	
2003	Walang Kapalit and Other Songs by Rey Valera: Released: 2003; Label: Viva; Formats: CD, Cassette	
2003	The Mega Collection: An Audio Visual Anthology: Released: 2003; Label: Viva; Formats: CD+VCD, CD, Cassette	

== Songs ==
- "Tawag ng Pag-Ibig"
- "Mr. DJ (Sharon Cuneta song)
- "Mahal Mo Pa Ba Ako"
- "Kahit Maputi Na ang Buhok Ko"
- "Kahapon Lamang" (from the film Forgive & Forget)
- "Itanggi Mo"
- "I-swing Mo Ako"
- "Friends" (theme from Friends in Love)
- "Mahal Kita, Mahal Mo Siya, Mahal Niya ay Iba"
- "High School Life" (theme from High School Scandal)
- "Dear Heart" (theme from Dear Heart)
- "P.S., I Love You" (theme from P.S. I Love You)
- "Langis at Tubig" (theme from Langis at Tubig)
- "To Love Again" (theme from To Love Again)
- "Pangarap na Bituin" (theme from Bukas Luluhod ang Mga Tala)
- "Bituing Walang Ningning" (theme from Bituing Walang Ningning)
- "Sana'y Maghintay ang Walang Hanggan"
- "Sana'y Wala Nang Wakas" (theme from Sana'y Wala Nang Wakas)
- "Sinasamba Kita" (theme from Sinasamba Kita)
- "Nakagapos na Puso" (theme from Nakagapos na Puso)
- "How Am I Gonna Tell You"
- "Kahit Konting Pagtingin" (theme from Kahit Konting Pagtingin)
- "Now That You're Gone"
- "Kahit Wala Ka Na" (theme from Kahit Wala Ka Na)
- "Parang Baliw"
- "Miss Kita Kung Christmas"
- "Parang Hindi Pasko"
- "Pasko Na Sinta Ko"
- "Maging Sino Ka Man" (theme from Maging Sino Ka Man)
- "Naalala Ka"
- "Pangako" (theme from Pangako Sa'yo)
- "Kung Kailangan Mo Ako" (theme from Kung Kailangan Mo Ako)
- "Tayong Dalawa" (theme from Tayong Dalawa)
- "Ngayon at Kailanman" (theme from Ngayon at Kailanman)
- "Ikaw" (theme from Ikaw)
- "Kapantay ay Langit" (theme from Kapantay ay Langit)
- "Kailangan Mo, Kailangan Ko"
- "Di'Na Natuto" (theme from 'Di Na Natuto)
- "One Last Time"
- "Kay Sarap Mong Kasama"
- "So Much in Love" (live)
- "Doors"
- "Both Sides Now" (theme from Magkapatid)
- "Starlight"
- "Nothing I Want More"
- "It's Only Love"
- "Where's the Good in Goodbye"
- "All I Ever Want"
- "Nananabik Sa Iyo"
- "Sometimes a Love Goes Wrong"
- "Terminal"
- "It Takes a Man and a Woman"
- "Laughter in the Rain"
- "Hanggang Dulo" (theme from Saving Grace)
- "Lantern"
- "Lipad ng Pangarap" (ABS-CBN 50th anniversary theme song)

=== Collaborations ===
- "Ewan" (duet with Louie Ocampo)
- "This Time I'll Be Sweeter" (duet with Angela Bofill)
- "Come What May" (duet with Gabby Concepcion)
- "Init sa Magdamag" (duet with Nonoy Zuñiga) (theme from Init sa Magdamag)
- "Kahit Konting Pagtingin/Kamusta Ka" (duet with Fernando Poe Jr.)
- "Sa Tuwing Naaalala Ka" (duet with Gary Valenciano)
- "All I Ask of You" (duet with Jun Polistico)
- "AM Ka, FM Ako" (duet with Rey Valera)
- "Ikaw" (duet with Ariel Rivera)
- "You're My Everything" (duet with Billy Preston)
- "Ikaw Pa Rin" (duet with Andrew E.)
- "All This Time" (duet with Side-A)
- "What If We Fall in Love" (duet with Richard Gomez)
- "If You Walked Away" (duet with David Pomeranz)
- "Sometimes When We Touch" (duet with Randy Santiago)
- "Ikaw Lang ang Mamahalin" (Live) (duet with Martin Nievera)
- "Starlight" (duet with KC Concepcion)
- "In Your Eyes" (duet with Andy Lau, Jim Brickman on piano)
- "One Dream" (Jim Brickman on piano)
- "Somewhere, Somehow" (duet with Gary Valenciano)
- "Sana'y Maghintay ang Walang Hanggan" (duet with Christopher De Leon)

== Video releases ==
Information	Sales
Sharon Cuneta: Live In Hawaii: Released: 1988; Concert; VHS, Betamax, Dyna CED VideoDisc, LaserDisc, DVD, Blu-ray	PARI: N/A
Sharon Cuneta Live: U.S. Concert Tour '88: Released: 1988; Concert; VHS, Betamax, Dyna CED VideoDisc, LaserDisc, DVD, Blu-ray	PARI: N/A
The Sharon Cuneta 1990 Concert Tour: Released: 1990; Concert; VHS, Betamax, Dyna CED VideoDisc, LaserDisc, DVD, Blu-ray	PARI: N/A
Twinkle Twinkle Megastar: Released: 1992; Concert; VHS, Betamax, Dyna CED VideoDisc, LaserDisc, DVD, Blu-ray	PARI: N/A
The Mega Concert (Cuneta Sa Cuneta): Released: 1993; Concert; VHS, Betamax, Dyna CED VideoDisc, LaserDisc, DVD, Blu-ray	PARI: N/A
Sing With The Megastar Videoke Volumes 1 - 3: Released: 1999; Karaoke/Compilation; VHS, Betamax, Dyna CED VideoDisc, LaserDisc, DVD, Blu-ray	PARI: N/A
Festival Of Hits: Released: 1999; Concert; VCD, DVD, Blu-ray	PARI: N/A
The Mega Collection: Released: 2003; Compilation; VCD, DVD, Blu-ray	PARI: N/A
