= Sharon: Kasama Mo, Kapatid =

2012–13 Philippine television talk show

- Genre: Talk, lifestyle, music
- Created by: Viva Television (Mega Productions, Inc.)
- Written by: Aya Cabardo; Abet Raz; Carlo Ventura; Jaypee Miguel; Mae Mañalac; Sheiden dela Cruz
- Directed by: Mark Meily; Ryan Evangelista
- Presented by: Sharon Cuneta
- Opening theme: "Kahit Maputi na Ang Buhok Ko" by Sharon Cuneta
- Composer: Rey Valera
- Country of origin: Philippines
- Original language: Tagalog
- No. of episodes: 167

Production
- Executive producers: Sharon Cuneta; Vicente del Rosario, Jr. Sandra Chavez; Crissy Baluyut
- Running time: 60 minutes

Original release
- Network: TV5
- Release: May 14, 2012 – January 4, 2013

Related
- Sharon

Sharon: Kasama Mo, Kapatid is a Philippine television talk show broadcast by TV5. Hosted by Sharon Cuneta, it aired from May 14, 2012 to January 4, 2013, replacing Public Atorni: Asunto o Areglo and was replaced by Jeepney Jackpot: Pera o Para!.

== Host ==
- Sharon Cuneta

== See also ==
- List of TV5 (Philippine TV network) original programming
