= Sharon Cuneta =

Filipino actress, singer, and television personality (born 1966)

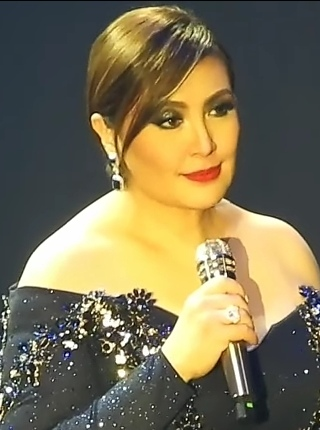
- Cuneta in 2019
- Born: Sharon Gamboa Cuneta; January 6, 1966 (age 60); Santa Mesa, Manila, Philippines
- Occupations: Actress; singer; television personality
- Years active: 1978–present
- Works: Discography; filmography
- Spouses: Gabby Concepcion (m. 1984; ann. 1993); Francis Pangilinan (m. 1996)
- Children: 4, including KC and Kakie
- Father: Pablo Cuneta
- Relatives: Helen Gamboa (aunt); Tito Sotto (uncle); Gian Sotto (cousin); Ciara Sotto (cousin); Lala Sotto (cousin); Anthony Pangilinan (brother-in-law); Gary Valenciano (brother-in-law); Maricel Laxa (sister-in-law); Paolo Valenciano (nephew); Gab Valenciano (nephew); Kiana Valenciano (niece); Gab Pangilinan (niece); Donny Pangilinan (nephew); Josh Buizon (nephew)
- Awards: Full list
- Musical career
- Origin: Quezon City, Metro Manila
- Genres: OPM; Manila sound; pop; Pinoy pop
- Instrument: Vocals
- Label: Vicor Music Corporation; Viva Records; Sony BMG Music Philippines (2001–2012); Star Music (2017–present)

Sharon Gamboa Cuneta-Pangilinan (born January 6, 1966) is a Filipino actress, singer, television personality, and businesswoman. Prolific in multiple fields of entertainment, she is known for playing dramatic and comedic leading roles in film and television. Her accolades include three FAMAS Awards, a Gawad Urian Award, nineteen Box Office Entertainment Awards, three PMPC Star Awards for Movies and two Luna Awards.

Referred to as the "Megastar", Cuneta began her career as a recording artist with the release of the 1978 single "Tawag ng Pag-ibig" under Vicor Music Corp. She rose to prominence following the success of "Mr. DJ", composed by Rey Valera. With record sales exceeding a million in the Philippines, Cuneta is one of the best-selling Filipino musical artist of all time. Among her multi-platinum albums include Isn't It Romantic? (2006), For Broken Hearts Only (1989), Movie Theme Songs (1990) and Sharon Sings Valera (1991). Some of her most successful songs include "Bituing Walang Ningning", "Mr. DJ", "High School Life", "Maging Sino Ka Man", "Langis at Tubig", "Sana'y Wala Nang Wakas", "P.S. I Love You", "To Love Again" and "Kahit Konting Pagtingin."

Following her success in music, Cuneta also ventured into film and television acting. In 1981, she starred in her first feature film Dear Heart opposite Gabby Conception. It was followed by a string of acclaimed and blockbuster films such as Bukas Luluhod ang Mga Tala (1984), Bituing Walang Ningning (1985), Babangon Ako't Dudurugin Kita (1989), Kahit Konting Pagtingin (1990), Maging Sino Ka Man (1991), Madrasta (1996), Crying Ladies (2003), Caregiver (2008) and Unexpectedly Yours (2017). In television, Cuneta hosted musical shows such as The Sharon Cuneta Show (1986), Sharon (1998), and served as judge in numerous talent competitions such as Star Power (2010), Your Face Sounds Familiar (2015), The Voice Kids (2016), and The Voice Teens (2017).

== Early life ==
Sharon Gamboa Cuneta was born on January 6, 1966, at Our Lady of Lourdes Hospital in Santa Mesa, Manila. Her mother, Elaine (née Gamboa; 1934–2014), who had one-quarter American blood, was the sister of actress Helen Gamboa. Her father, Pablo Cuneta (1910–2000), was a former mayor of Pasay. She has a brother named Cesar "Chet" who ran for Pasay mayor in the 2019 elections but lost.

Cuneta grew up listening to her father's record collection. Her mother, Elaine Gamboa, was a piano major at the University of Santo Tomas Conservatory of Music in her youth. The young Cuneta would take up piano, guitar, and flute lessons to broaden her musical training and exposure at a young age. At the age of three, Cuneta would accompany her aunt, actress Helen Gamboa, during recordings of her television shows.

Another of her first proper TV appearances was on Ike Lozada's show, for the "Bulilit" portion, where she mimicked the songs of her aunt, Helen Gamboa. Cuneta was just as young when she appeared in her first movie, the Rosanna Ortiz-George Estregan vehicle Lovers for Hire where she played one of Roderick Paulate's playmates.

Cuneta attended St. Paul College, Pasig, and International School Manila for her primary to secondary education.

== Career ==
=== 1978–1980: Career beginnings ===
In January 1978, the 12-year old Cuneta made her first visit to Vicor Records. Her uncle and vice president of Vicor, Tito Sotto, asked her to record "Tawag Ng Pag-Ibig" which he produced for her at Vicor and shortly after, she was on television promoting her own song for the first time and on the TV show Discorama hosted by TVJ.

The young Sharon was being interviewed live on Discorama, where she stated: "This is the show I watch every week. This is the show that I don’t know how many hundreds of thousands or millions of people watch in the whole country. When it hit me, I couldn’t talk."

In May 1978, Sharon Cuneta followed up with a song by Rey Valera entitled "Mr. DJ". Her producer in Vicor, Tito Sotto, wanted Valera to make a song that would appeal to the Radio DJ's and convince them to play her record on the air.

"Mr. DJ" became a popular hit and gave Cuneta the moniker, "DJ's Pet" (which also became the title of her debut LP). Cuneta received her first Gold Record for this and her music label Vicor Records came out with succeeding albums like "Sharon" and "Sharon Cuneta", and then "High School" with the same level of success.

Cuneta released further popular singles including "Naaalala Ka", "I-Swing Mo Ako", "Kahit Maputi Na Ang Buhok Ko" and "High School Life", which were also part of the Manila Sound era.

Aside from her recording career, Cuneta also began hosting with her aunt, Helen Gamboa, in a TV variety show titled C.U.T.E. or Call Us Two for Entertainment on IBC 13.

In 1980, because of her commercial success as a young singer, Cuneta's boss at the time in Vicor Music, Boss Vic Del Rosario, gave her the golden opportunity to record her first George Canseco song "Tubig at Langis". This became the theme song of the film with same title starring Vilma Santos and directed by Danny Zialcita.

During the Cebu Film Festival that same year, "Langis at Tubig" was an official entry and had a float made for the parade at the Sinulog Festival. The only people there were the director, Danny Zialcita and Sining Silangan producer, Ernie Rojas. But there were no actors from the actual movie who were able to go to Cebu for this event as the main lead, Vilma Santos, was pregnant at the time. Sining Silangan asked permission from Vic Del Rosario if the young Sharon Cuneta who sang the theme song could join them on the float. Del Rosario agreed and Cuneta, accompanied by her mother Elaine, headed to Cebu.

"My Mom and I got on the float. We went to Cebu, my first time ever. When I got on the float and it started moving, I couldn’t believe how people reacted to me. That they knew me. I just felt all this love come towards me like a rain of bullets. I can’t explain the feeling. At that age, I was 14 already. A veteran (laughs) after 2 years of singing."

=== 1981–1984: Dear Heart and the start of a movie career ===
On the same day as the Sinulog Festival Float Ride during the Cebu Film Festival, Director Danny Zialcita asked Cuneta to appear in an upcoming film. Her parents eventually agreed to meet with Danny Zialcita. Despite asking for an outlandishly large fee, Silangan agreed to pay the sum without reservation. "Ok po. Call". That was it. Zialcita told her: "If you would do this for me I will make you a star. It was a commitment, a promise I made to her." "The topic of the leading man came up. Direk Danny said, 'Who would you want to be your leading man?' And my answer, of all things to say, was anybody but Gabby Concepcion. Turns out, the only one available was Gabby Concepcion."

Cuneta starred in her first feature film, Dear Heart. She was paired with then Close-Up model and Regal Films' 1980s heartthrob, Gabby Concepcion. Dear Heart was successful and paved the way for future collaborations.

Due to the commercial success of Dear Heart, a sequel was made. Since Sining Silangan didn't have the means to create an immediate follow up film, Mayor Pablo Cuneta collaborated with Vic Del Rosario and established Viva Films. On November 12, 1981, Viva Films released its first feature film, P.S. I Love You, starring Cuneta and Concepcion. The film was a box office success and was followed by another Sharon-Gabby collaboration, My Only Love (1982).

Cuneta was also paired with other leading men, with the likes of William Martinez (in Forgive and Forget), Rowell Santiago (in Cross My Heart and Friends in Love) and Miguel Rodriguez (in To Love Again) from 1982 to 1983, which made her the Ms. RP Movies for the years mentioned.

Cuneta top billed three blockbuster melodramas in 1984: Sa Hirap at Ginhawa, Bukas, Luluhod And Mga Tala, and Dapat Ka Bang Mahalin? that led to her eventual crowning as 1984's Box Office Queen of RP Movies.

Cuneta also staged a two-night sold-out major concert at the Araneta Coliseum titled Sharon Solo with the Boys on July 20 and 21, 1984, and was cited as the year's Most Outstanding Female Concert Hall Act by Aliw Awards.

=== 1985–1989: "Megastar" and The Sharon Cuneta Show ===
In 1985, a pet project of the late Mina Aragon-del Rosario, Bituing Walang Ningning was made into a film by Viva Films starring Cuneta, Christopher de Leon and Cherie Gil. The film was released on Valentine's Day, 1985, and was a box office success, crowning Cuneta once again as 1985's Box Office Queen of RP Movies and "Bida sa Takilya", the latter given at the 1986 FAMAS Awards. The moniker "Megastar" was also given to her by the press during that year because of her continuous success in the box office.

Cuneta was also awarded Best Actress by FAMAS for her performance in the 1984 film Dapat Ka Bang Mahalin and by the Film Academy of the Philippines for Sa Hirap at Ginhawa]. In 1986, Cuneta's string of hit movies continued as she stars on three major movies: Nakagapos Na Puso (with Lorna Tolentino), Captain Barbell (where she played a cameo role as Darna) and Sana'y Wala Nang Wakas (with Cherie Gil and Dina Bonnevie), the latter seeing her again awarded the 1986 Box Office Queen of RP Movies.

Her first solo musical-variety show, The Sharon Cuneta Show, also premiered in September 1986 on IBC, which also went on to be one of the longest running musical-variety shows in Philippine television.

While filming her first feature film Dear Heart (1981), Cuneta began dating her on-screen partner Gabby Concepcion and the two continued co-starring in films like P.S. I Love You (1981) and Dapat Ka Bang Mahalin? (lit. Shall You Be Loved?) (1984).

After her short-lived marriage with Concepcion, Cuneta worked with National Artist for Film, Lino Brocka, for the first time via the film Pasan Ko ang Daigdig. The film did not fare well at the box office; however, it earned Cuneta another Best Actress nomination from FAMAS. In 1988, Cuneta only did two films, Jack 'n Jill Sa Amerika and Buy One, Take One, both receiving lukewarm response from the public. Cuneta's variety show was moved from IBC to ABS-CBN on March 6, 1988.

Cuneta continued touring abroad with "The Sharon Cuneta US Concert Tour '88" and was given a Plaque of Welcome and Appreciation from Los Angeles Mayor Tom Bradley at her show at the Los Angeles Shrine Auditorium. In 1989, Cuneta worked with Lino Brocka once again in two movies, 3 Mukha Ng Pag-ibig and Babangon Ako't Dudurugin Kita, the latter giving her another Best Actress nomination from FAMAS and the Film Academy of the Philippines.

=== 1990–1995: Box Office Queen Hall of Fame ===
Cuneta's box office success continued with roles alongside popular action stars like Fernando Poe Jr. (Kahit Konting Pagtingin-1990) Robin Padilla ,(Maging Sino Ka Man-1991), Ramon 'Bong' Revilla Jr. (Pangako Sa 'Yo-1992), Rudy Fernandez (Kung Kailangan Mo Ako-1993). All those movies were certified blockbusters, that though she was already elevated to Hall of Fame as Box-Office Queen in 1990, she was crowned again in 1991 through 1993 because of the success of her movies.

Cuneta also reconciled with estranged husband, Gabby Concepcion, in three more films, Bakit Ikaw Pa Rin? (1990), Una Kang Naging Akin (1991) and Tayong Dalawa (1992), the latter giving her a grandslam Best Actress nomination from PMPC Star Awards for Movies, FAMAS, Film Academy of the Philippines and Gawad Urian. Cuneta won a Platinum award in 1992, Double Platinum award in 1991 and 1992, and Triple Platinum award in 1992.

In 1992, Cuneta reunited with former flame, Richard Gomez in the film Ngayon at Kailanman and in 1994 with Kapantay Ay Langit.

=== 1996: "Madrasta", second marriage and hiatus ===
For the first time, in 1996, Cuneta made a film outside her mother studio Viva Films via the film Madrasta from Star Cinema. This film garnered her Best Actress Awards from all major award-giving bodies in the Philippines, hence a Grandslam win for her outstanding performance in the film. Cuneta became one of the few actresses (along with Vilma Santos, Nora Aunor, and Lorna Tolentino) to be given a grand slam best actress award in Philippine Cinema.

=== 2000–2011: Multi-media era ===
In 2000, Cuneta filmed Minsan Minahal Kita alongside Richard Gomez, which earned P10 million on its opening day.

She was named Best Actress during the 2002 Manila Film Festival in June for her role in Viva Films' Magkapatid. In the same month she was given a civic award by the City of Manila the Patnubay ng Sining at Kalinwigan for cinema. Other list of awardees included the likes of Raul Locsin for architecture, Agnes Arellano for sculpture and the late Santiago Bose for new art form.

She did not make any films from 2004 through 2007 as she concentrated her career more on television and music. In 2006, she released a studio album, Isn't it Romantic, which was awarded with a Diamond certification (sold over 250,000 units in the Philippines).

On January 6, 2006, Cuneta returned to television from her maternity leave with a 40th birthday celebration on ABS-CBN's Ang Pagbabalik Ng Bituin (The Return of the Star). The following month, she came back to her musical talk show, Sharon. After a long rest from filmmaking, she made another film, Caregiver, in 2008, which, according to ABS-CBN, is their most expensive film. In this film, Cuneta played the role of a school teacher working abroad as a caregiver. The film was the fifth highest-grossing film of 2008.

In 2009, Cuneta starred in BFF: Best Friends Forever with Ai-Ai delas Alas and for the first time in her 30 years, a film with Regal Entertainment via Mano Po 6 (which later on gave her another Best Actress citation at the 2009 Metro Manila Film Festival). On January 12, 2010, coinciding with her annual birthday show, she launched her eponymous magazine Sharon at Home.

Her long-running musical talk show, Sharon, ended on October 3, 2010, and was replaced by a talent show (which she also hosted), Star Power with singers Christian Bautista and Erik Santos as her co-hosts. After Star Power, Cuneta hosted the Philippine franchise of the popular US reality show, The Biggest Loser Pinoy Edition on May 30, 2011, which she co-hosted.

=== 2011–2013: Transfer to TV5 ===
On November 22, 2011, Cuneta left ABS-CBN, her home network of 23 years, and signed a five-year contract with TV5. The contract was rumored to be worth one billion pesos, according to celebrity tweets in microblogging site Twitter, which is the biggest talent fee ever of any local artist in the Philippine showbiz history.

In 2012, Cuneta started her first talk show under her new network, Sharon: Kasama Mo, Kapatid. The show ran for eight months.

In September 2013, Cuneta became a co-host of musical variety talk show The Mega and the Songwriter alongside Ogie Alcasid. Cuneta's comedy series, Madam Chairman, premiered on October 14. It was her first TV series in 35 years. It revolves around a barangay chairwoman and her struggles in dividing her role as a mother and as a public official.

=== 2014–present: Departure from TV5 and return to ABS-CBN ===
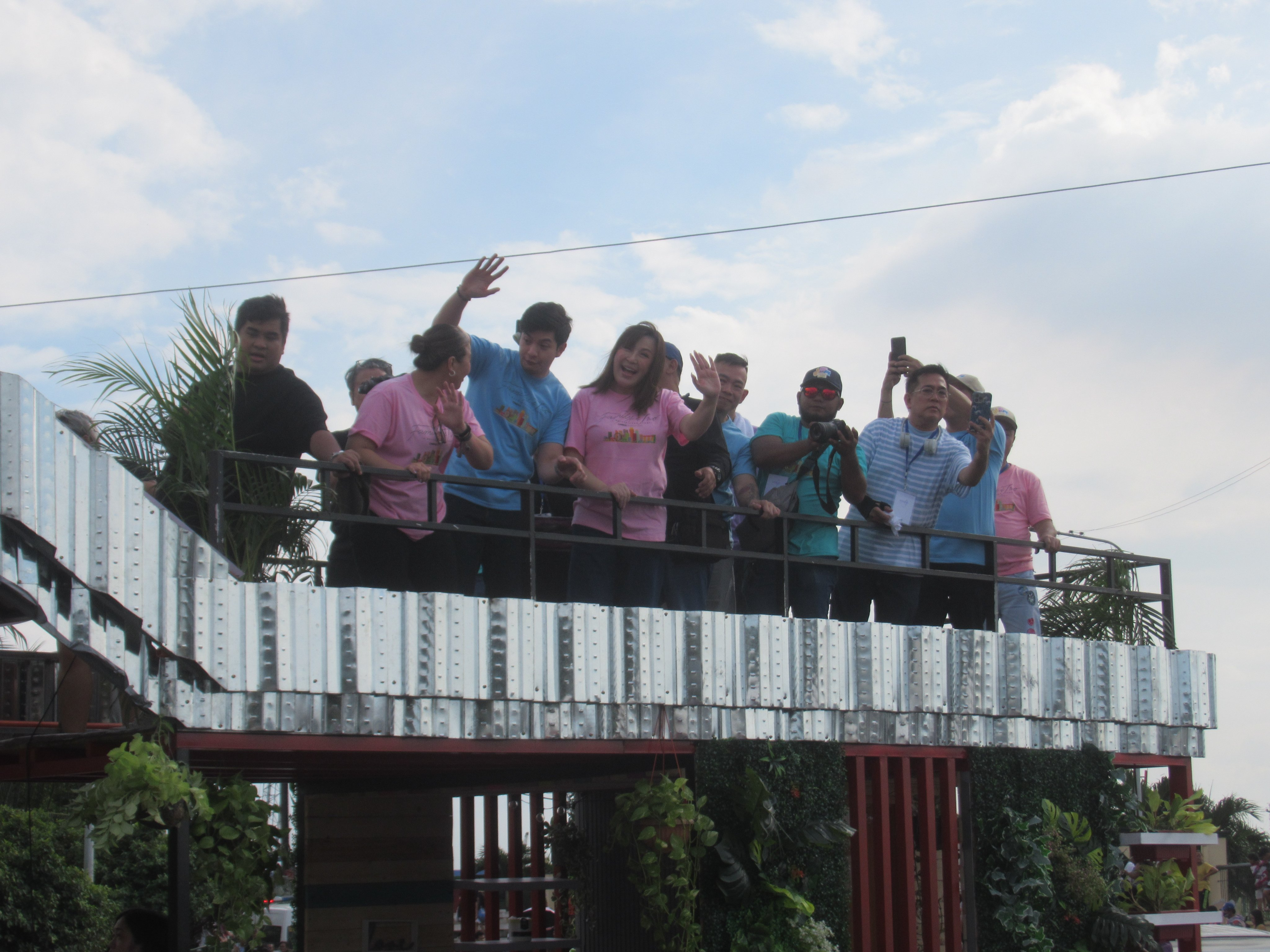
Cuneta (center, in pink) promoting Family of Two at the 2023 Metro Manila Film Festival parade.

In September 2014, Cuneta announced through Facebook and Twitter that she had pre-terminated her five-year contract with TV5 and was a freelancer. In March 2015, she signed a contract with ABS-CBN, marking her return to her home network of 23 years, saying: "It is overwhelmingly wonderful! There's really no place like home. I don't belong to anywhere else, and now I'm back home, safe and sound." Upon returning, she also announced that her first project in the channel would be as a judge in Your Face Sounds Familiar. In an interview on May 2, 2016, on TV Patrol, she stated that she will serve as one of the three coaches (judges) for the third season of The Voice Kids, replacing Sarah Geronimo who earlier this year confirmed her departure from the show. She also became one of the coaches for the first season of The Voice Teens.

== Personal life ==
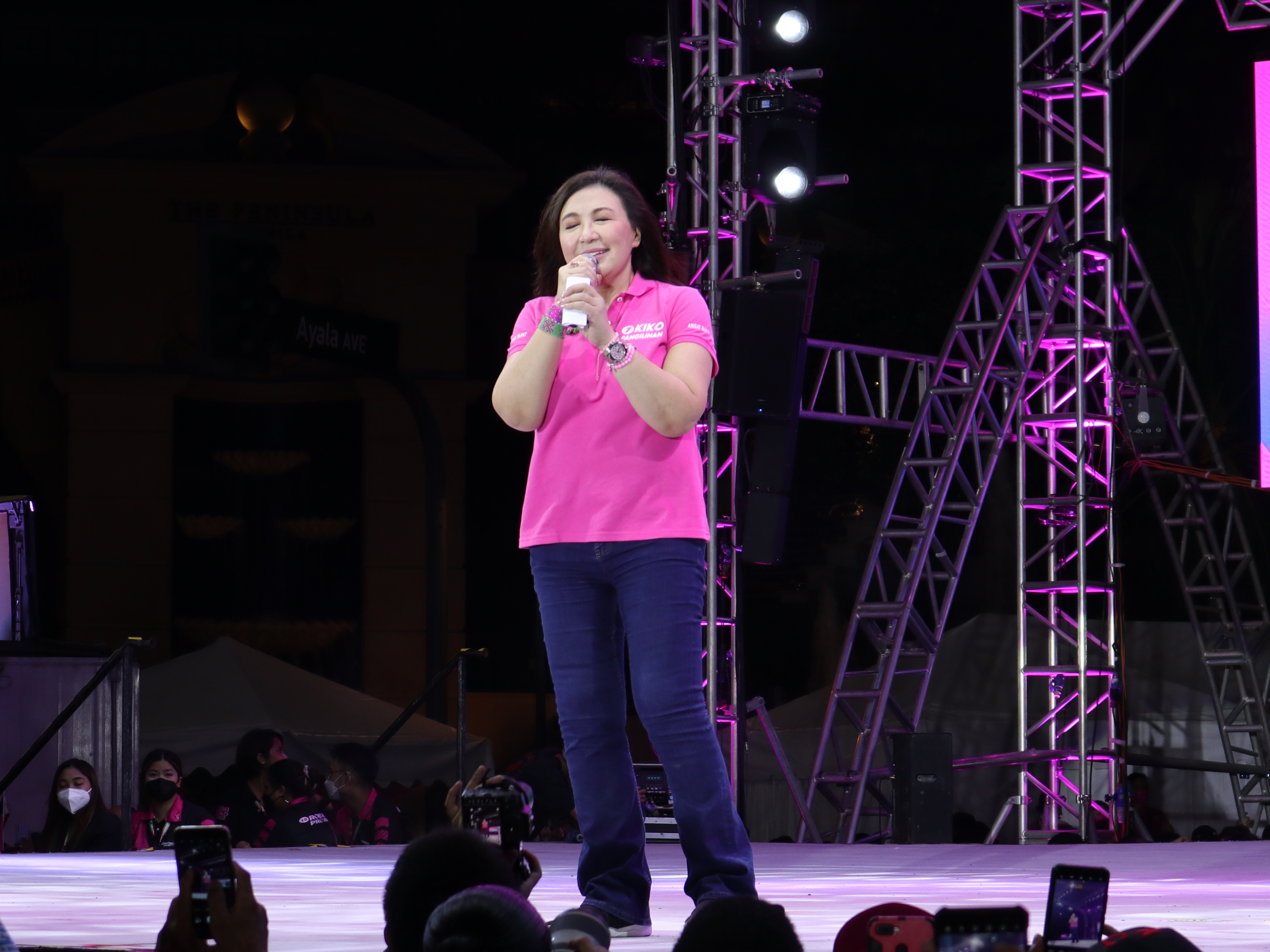
Cuneta campaigning for her husband in 2022.

While filming her first feature film Dear Heart (1981), Cuneta began dating her on-screen partner Gabby Concepcion and the two continued co-starring in films like P.S. I Love You (1981) and Dapat Ka Bang Mahalin? (1984). The two married on September 23, 1984, at Manila Cathedral. Then-President and autocrat Ferdinand Marcos was among the sponsors. The couple had one child, actress KC Concepcion, born in April 1985. In August 1987, Cuneta and Concepcion legally separated, citing irreconcilable differences and bigamy; Concepcion was already legally married to another woman. Their marriage was annulled in 1993.

Cuneta met politician Francis Pangilinan during a taping of Hoy Gising!, which Pangilinan co-hosted. The two began dating in 1994 and married on April 28, 1996. In 1997, Cuneta, her daughter KC, and Pangilinan moved to Boston, where Cuneta completed her major in business while her husband finished his post-graduate studies at Harvard University. Pangilinan has since adopted KC. Aside from KC, Cuneta and Pangilinan have two daughters, including singer-songwriter Kakie, and one adopted son. The Pangilinan family maintains residences in Makati and in Ayala Westgrove Heights in Silang, Cavite. Cuneta and her daughter KC also maintain their legal residency in the United States, currently based in Los Angeles.

Cuneta is a fan of the K-pop groups Exo, NCT 127, and Shinee. She, along with her youngest daughter, met NCT 127 in 2019.

On May 10, 2024, Cuneta and Pangilinan filed before the Makati prosecutors' office complaints against radio host Cristy Fermin. Britanico Sarmiento and Ringler Law Offices said the case is anchored on alleged defamation, in violation of the Cybercrime Prevention Act of 2012, centering on the couple's "personal and family affairs". On Cristy FerMinute, Fermin replied to the complaints, saying that "she understood where the couple was coming from".

== Legacy ==
"The industry cannot survive, the history of the industry cannot be made without mentioning the one and only Sharon Cuneta."

— Joel Lamangan on Cuneta's cultural significance in Philippine entertainment (2018).

Dubbed as the "Megastar" for her unprecedented success in film, music and television, A&R Director of BMG Philippines Vic Valenciano noted Cuneta's commercial power saying: "Sharon is a huge singing, acting, television and modeling star in the Philippines and has a strong following of [Filipino] domestic helpers in Hong Kong, Taiwan and Singapore... and Malaysia." Cuneta is the first Filipina artist to sell out at the Los Angeles Shrine Auditorium, first in 1988 and again in 2005. Her poster is enshrined in the Shrine Auditorium's Hall of Fame next to those of Michael Jackson, Barbra Streisand and the Ballet Folklorico de Mexico. Her concert reportedly created a traffic jam in the 1980s that puzzled the former Mayor of Los Angeles Tom Bradley. After hearing of her success, the mayor attended the concert and awarded Sharon with an Honorary Key to the City of Los Angeles. She has interviewed other celebrities such as Mandy Moore, Vic Chou and Jerry Yan.

Cuneta is also recognized as the most expensive and effective product endorser in the Philippines, dominating billboards, TV commercials, newspaper ads and selling everything for the upscale market and the masses. She was recognized as an "Ulirang Ina" and a Hallmark Channel Woman Achiever awardee in 2001. In 2002, she was one of the youngest honorees in the "Patnubay ng Sining at Kalinangan (for Cinema)", given by the City of Manila. In 2004 she was named one of the "Philippines' 15 Best Actresses of All Time" by the Directors’ Guild of the Philippines, Inc. (DGPI) In the same year, she was also named "Most Effective Product Endorser" because of her credibility by the A.C. Nielsen, a top-rated survey group in the Philippines. In December 2004, Sharon Cuneta was the first in her category (“Arts/Movies”) to be awarded the highly prestigious TOYM or "The Outstanding Young Men" award, presented to her by then-President Gloria Macapagal-Arroyo.

Cuneta is the first recipient of the Myx Magna Award in 2006 as a music icon with an exemplary contribution to Philippine music. She was the recipient of the OPM Lifetime Achievement Award at the MOR Pinoy Music Awards in 2015. On April 26, 2015, Cuneta received the Dolphy Lifetime Achievement Award at the 6th Golden Screen Awards. In 2017, Sharon Cuneta was elevated to the Makabata Hall of Fame of the ANAK TV Awards for being voted as Makabata Stars for seven years. In 2018, she received the History Maker Award 2018 from A+E Networks Asia which honors Filipinos who have had a significant impact on the nation's life and culture. Cuneta was also the first recipient of the VIVA Icon Award at the Viva Convention in 2019 for her invaluable contribution to television, film, recording and concerts.

== Artistry ==
Cuneta possesses an Alto vocal range, noted for her delivery and tone. Her music, primarily in pop, has been referenced and impersonated in pop culture like Pinoy drag and singing competitions, as well as influenced a generation of artists like the American R&B artist, H.E.R and Asia's Songbird, Regine Velasquez. She has already worked with world renowned performers including Angela Bofill, Andy Lao, Billy Preston, David Pomeranz, and Michael Buble.

Cuneta has received many acclaims over the years, mostly about her appearance and attitude.

== Business Ventures and Career Management ==
In February 2026, Sharon Cuneta announced plans to establish her own management company to oversee her career, schedules, and projects. Her team includes longtime producer Eloisa Matias, who handles corporate appearances, musical shows, and music-related activities, and executive assistant Maricar Ong, who manages her television and film projects.

In July 2025, Cuneta also revealed plans to develop a scented candle collection through a collaboration with U.S.-based candlemaker Kim Grice of Grice Wax & Wicks. This venture reflects her interest in candle-making and home fragrances.

Additionally, in a February 2025 interview, Cuneta shared that she had been reading books about Airbnb because she was interested in exploring the business. However, the interview did not confirm that she had already started an Airbnb venture.

== Other ventures ==
=== Endorsements ===
Cuneta is the most expensive and effective product endorser in the country.

McDonald's, Coca-Cola, Lux, Selecta, Sunsilk, Globe Telecom, pH Care, Lucky Me, SuperFerry, Alaska Milk, Colgate, Nestlé, Smart Communications and Tempra were some of the products that made Cuneta a notable ambassador. At one time, Cuneta was earning ₱8 million to ₱15 million per product endorsed.

=== Sharon at Home magazine ===
Cuneta has also released her own lifestyle magazine, Sharon at Home, published by ABS-CBN Publishing. She serves as the magazine's editor-in-chief.

=== Real estate enterprises and other business ventures ===
Cuneta owns a residential project of six high-quality exclusive four-storey townhouses at No. 74 Scout Rallos, Quezon City, near trendy restaurants in the area and within walking distance to and from Tomas Morato and Timog Avenues.

Aside from residential real estate enterprises, Cuneta and Pangilinan own a three-hectare farm called Sweet Spring Country Farm in the uplands of Alfonso, Cavite.

== Filmography ==
=== Television ===
- 1979–1980: Call Us Two for Entertainment
- 1979–1985: GMA Supershow
- 1983–1984, 2023–present: Eat Bulaga!
- 1986–1997: The Sharon Cuneta Show
- 1997: The Sharon Cuneta Christmas Special: I'll Be Home For Christmas
- 1998–2004, 2006–2010: Sharon
- 2010: Star Power: Sharon's Search For The Next Female Superstar
- 2010: Sharon at Home
- 2011: The Biggest Loser: Pinoy Edition
- 2012–2013: Sharon: Kasama Mo, Kapatid
- 2013: Pinoy Explorer
- 2013–2014: Madam Chairman
  The Mega and the Songwriter
- 2015, 2021, 2025–2026: Your Face Sounds Familiar
- 2015–present: ASAP
- 2016: The Voice Kids
- 2017: The Voice Teens
- 2017, 2018: Your Face Sounds Familiar Kids
- 2021–2022: FPJ's Ang Probinsyano
- 2024–2025: Saving Grace
- 2026: Honor Thy Mother
