= The Sharon Cuneta Show =

Philippine television talk show

- Also known as: Sharon; TSCS
- Genre: Talk show; Variety; Musical
- Directed by: Bert de Leon; Rowell Santiago; Al Quinn; Danni Caparas
- Presented by: Sharon Cuneta
- Country of origin: Philippines
- Original language: Filipino
- No. of episodes: 562

Production
- Executive producers: Lenny C. Parto (IBC); Olivia M. Lamasan (ABS-CBN)
- Producer: Vic R. Del Rosario
- Production locations: Live Studio 2, IBC Studio, Broadcast City, Quezon City (1986–88); Studio 2, ABS-CBN Broadcasting Center, Quezon City, Philippines (1988–96, 1997); Delta Theater, Quezon Avenue, Quezon City (1996–97)
- Running time: 1 hour and 30 minutes (1986–88); 2 hours (1988–97)
- Production companies: Viva Television; Intercontinental Broadcasting Corporation (1986–88); ABS-CBN Entertainment Department (1988–97)

Original release
- Network: IBC (1986–88); ABS-CBN (1988–97)
- Release: September 14, 1986 – June 15, 1997

Related
- Sharon

The Sharon Cuneta Show (also known as Sharon, and TSCS) is a Philippine television talk show broadcast by IBC and ABS-CBN. Hosted by Sharon Cuneta, it premiered on September 14, 1986 on IBC. It transferred to ABS-CBN on March 6, 1988. The show concluded on June 15, 1997, with a total of 562 episodes.

== Hosts ==
Hosts

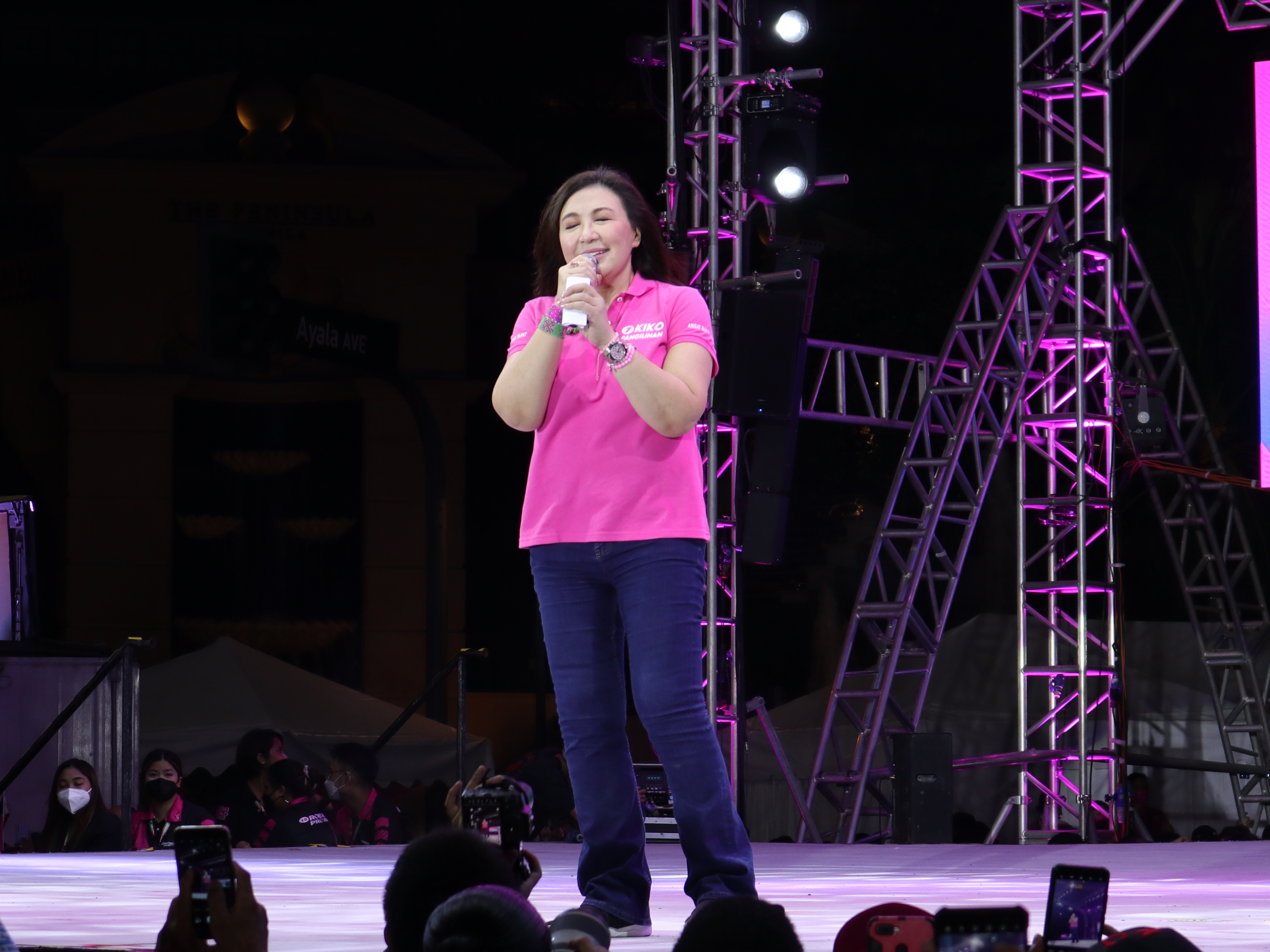
Sharon Cuneta

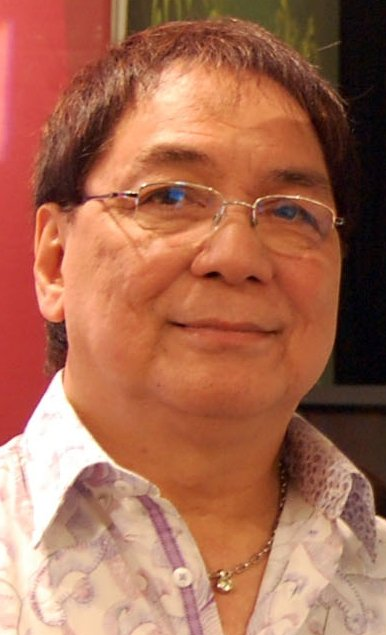
Joey de Leon

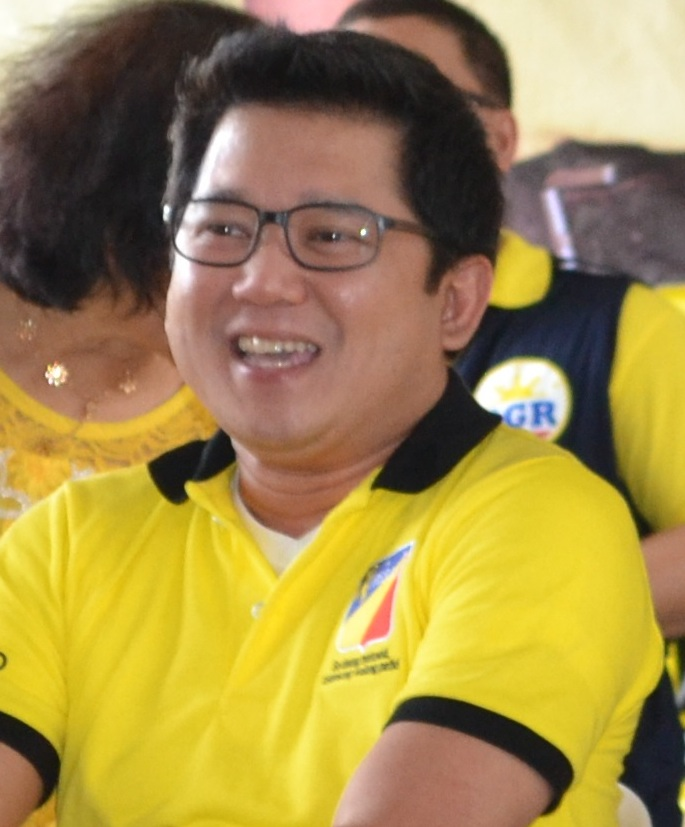
Herbert Bautista

- Sharon Cuneta

Co-hosts

- Joey de Leon (1986–1990)
- Jimmy Santos (1990–1994)
- Herbert Bautista (1990–1997)
- Randy Santiago (1994–1997)
- Bayani Agbayani (1996–1997)
- Manny Castañeda

Featuring

- Adrenalin Dancers
- VIP Dancers
- Megaband

== Accolades ==
Accolades received by The Sharon Cuneta Show
Year	Award	Category	Recipient	Result	Ref.
1990	4th PMPC Star Awards for Television	Best Female TV Host	Sharon Cuneta	Won	
1993	7th PMPC Star Awards for Television	Best Female TV Host	Sharon Cuneta	Won	
1993	7th PMPC Star Awards for Television	Best Musical Variety Show	The Sharon Cuneta Show	Won	
1994	8th PMPC Star Awards for Television	Best Female TV Host	Sharon Cuneta	Won	
1995	9th PMPC Star Awards for Television	Best Female TV Host	Sharon Cuneta	Won	
1996	10th PMPC Star Awards for Television	Best Female TV Host	Sharon Cuneta	Won	
