= Mr. DJ (Sharon Cuneta song) =

1978 song by Sharon Cuneta

Single by Sharon Cuneta

from the album DJ's Pet
- Released: 1978
- Recorded: 1978
- Genre: Manila sound
- Label: Sunshine/Vicor
- Songwriter: Rey Valera
- Producer: Spanky Rigor

Sharon Cuneta singles chronology
"Tawag ng Pag-ibig" (1978)	"Mr. DJ" (1978)	"Kahit Maputi Na ang Buhok Ko" (1978)

Music video
- "Mr. DJ - Sharon Cuneta" on YouTube

"Mr. DJ" is a song written by Filipino composer Rey Valera and recorded by Sharon Cuneta in 1978, when she was 12 years old. The single was produced by Spanky Rigor of VST & Company. It became Cuneta's first and one of her biggest hits. The song drove her rise to stardom; she became an actress and was soon labelled as "The Megastar" in Philippine showbiz.

== Song history ==
Tito Sotto, who was the vice president of Vicor Music Corporation at that time and Cuneta's uncle, called upon Valera to write a song about disc jockeys; Sotto suggested that the title should be "Mr. DJ". Valera, who began a recording career as a member of Electric Hair Band, went solo and became a songwriter for other artists including Rico J. Puno before he found success on his solo career. Cuneta had already released her debut single Tawag ng Pag-Ibig ("Call of Love") and the song played on nationwide radio. Sotto however, was not satisfied with that.

In an interview on the Philippine morning talk show Magandang Buhay ("Beautiful Life"), Valera recalls writing the song while riding a jeepney (usually from Monumento to his home in Meycauayan), and in a cemetery. He found it challenging since he could not figure out what kind song would be fitting for Cuneta, as she was too young to be taken seriously with a love song, and a bit too old to be given a nursery rhyme.

== Cover versions ==
- Joey de Leon (titled "Ang Mister Kong DJ")
- Regine Velasquez
- Kathryn Bernardo
- Madfish, Mga Himig Natin vol. 2 (1995, Viva/Neo Records)
