= The Mega and the Songwriter =

2013–14 Philippine television variety show

- Title card
- Genre: Musical talk show
- Created by: TV5 Entertainment Group
- Directed by: Bert de Leon
- Presented by: Sharon Cuneta; Ogie Alcasid
- Country of origin: Philippines
- Original language: Filipino
- No. of episodes: 18

Production
- Executive producer: Juel Falbon
- Production locations: Studio 4, TV5 Media Center, Reliance St. Mandaluyong
- Running time: 60 minutes

Original release
- Network: TV5
- Release: September 15, 2013 – January 26, 2014

The Mega and the Songwriter is a Philippine television variety show broadcast by TV5. Hosted by Sharon Cuneta and Ogie Alcasid, it aired from September 15, 2013 to January 26, 2014, replacing Sine Ko Singko and was replaced by Sunday Sineplex. The show features several music guests ranging from established acts to veteran singers. The show features various segments that encourages viewers to interact with the show through various social networking sites.

== History ==
Launched on September 15, 2013, it is one of the 8 newly launched weekend programs under the "Weekend Do It Better" block of the network. The show is also Alcasid's first project under the channel following his transfer from GMA Network on August 6.

Last November 10, 2013, TMTS broadcast live for the first time; conducting a 5-hour live telethon special dedicated to the victims of Typhoon Yolanda. TV5 through the Alagang Kapatid Foundation, Inc. have raised P30 million pesos for the families affected by the Super Typhoon.

== Segments ==
The program features various segments where the viewers can interact with the show and its co-host.

- Philippine Online Sensation on TV (P.O.S.T) - viewers are asked to upload videos of themselves singing on YouTube. The co-hosts will randomly invite a lucky act onto the show to perform.
- Ask the Songwriter - Viewers submit any kind of story on the show's website. Ogie Alcasid will write an original song about the story and perform it on the show.
- IRequest by the Megastar - Viewers request a song for Sharon Cuneta via social media sites (Facebook, Twitter) to perform during the show.

== Hosts ==
- Ogie Alcasid
- Sharon Cuneta

== See also ==
- TV5
- List of TV5 (Philippine TV network) original programming
- List of Philippine television shows
