= High School Life =

Single by Sharon Cuneta

from the album High School
- Released: March 25, 1981
- Recorded: January 1981
- Genre: Pop
- Length: 3:36
- Label: Sunshine/Vicor
- Songwriter(s): George Canseco

Sharon Cuneta singles chronology
| "High School Life" (1981) | "P.S. I Love You" (1981) |

"High School", commonly known as "High School Life", is a song by Filipina singer and actress Sharon Cuneta. The song was written by George Canseco as the theme song for the 1981 film High School Scandal starring Gina Alajar and Sandy Andolong. It was released in 1981 during Cuneta's high school years when she was 15, and serves also as the lead single from Cuneta’s greatest hits album, High School (1981).

== Background ==
The content of the song is about life in high school. Sharon Cuneta states that "high school life" is ganda (beautiful) in every memory and exciting and saya (nice).

The song is popular as a graduation song in the Philippines.

== Cover versions ==
The song has been covered by Loisa Andalio with a video released in 2017. Other artists who covered the song include Bea Binene and Half Life Half Death (1995, from the compilation album Mga Himig Natin Vol. 2), and the song has also been sampled by other artists.
