= Caregiver (film) =

- Theatrical movie poster
- Directed by: Chito S. Roño
- Screenplay by: Chris Martinez
- Story by: Chris Martinez; Jewel C. Castro; Chito S. Roño
- Produced by: Charo Santos-Concio; Malou N. Santos
- Starring: Sharon Cuneta
- Cinematography: Eli Balce
- Edited by: Manet A. Dayrit
- Music by: Carmina Robles-Cuya
- Production company: Star Cinema
- Distributed by: ABS-CBN Film Productions
- Release date: May 28, 2008
- Country: Philippines
- Languages: Filipino; English
- Box office: ₱139 million

Caregiver is a 2008 Filipino drama film directed by Chito S. Roño and written by Chris Martinez from a story he co-wrote with Roño and Jewel C. Castro. The film stars Sharon Cuneta, portraying the role of Sarah, a mother who left her son in the Philippines and also a teacher who relinquished her profession in place of care giving in London, in hopes of augmenting her salary.

== Plot summary ==
Sarah Gonzales, a grade school teacher of English, joins the 150,000 Overseas Filipino Workers in the United Kingdom to support her husband, Teddy Gonzales, in making a better living for their family. More than just a chronicle of the Filipino experience working as nurses and caregivers in the UK, this story also charts Sarah's journey of self-discovery from a submissive wife who makes sacrifices for her husband's aspirations to an empowered woman who finds dignity and pride in a humbling job as a caregiver in London.

The story begins as Sarah says goodbye to her familiar world. After finishing an arduous course in caregiving, she bids farewell to the Grade 5 classroom where she teaches English. She buys a winter coat for her son Paulo and promises he will use it once she can afford to bring him to London. In typical Pinoy fashion, she shares tearful goodbyes with her family at the airport when she finally leaves for the United Kingdom.

Sarah arrives in London. At their apartment, she and Teddy share a passionate reunion. In a honeymoon mood, he takes her to the beautiful sights around London. While shopping at a neighborhood store, Sarah meets Sean, a spunky Filipino boy, as he tries to shoplift chocolate bars.

After the initial excitement, she experiences the hard challenges some Filipino caregivers faces every day: cold weather, dirty work and difficult patients.

Meanwhile, Teddy also struggles with the daily grind at the hospital where he works. He is stressed and drinks often because he has failed the nursing test twice.

Despite the difficulty of adjusting to living in London, Sarah faithfully stands by Teddy. She tries to make the most of the situation by doing her best at work and earning the respect of Mr. Morgan, a wealthy old man. However, Teddy is oblivious to her success as he is absorbed in his own problems with work. Sarah finds solace in her friendship with Mr. Morgan and his son David, who seems to appreciate her more than Teddy does, and with Sean, who eases her longing for her own son.

Tension rises between Sarah and Teddy as the stress of London life takes its toll on their marriage. Because of mounting conflict both at work and home, Teddy decides to give up. He tells Sarah that they are going back to the Philippines.

Sarah finds it very hard to accept Teddy's decision. She knows that staying in London is the best thing for their family because returning to the Philippines would only mean going back to the same problems they had before.

When Mr. Morgan dies, Sarah decides to go back to the Philippines with Teddy. While packing her bags, she notices the book Mr. Morgan gave her and reads his letter describing how lucky her husband and son are to have her and reminding her that she is a person who should do things that make her feel alive. And he wishes her to be happy and without regret.

On the way to the airport, Teddy shows his nasty attitude again and makes Sarah realize that she can leave him and that she is her own person. She walks out on him and rides a taxi back to London. The story ends with Sarah reunited with her son Paulo and Sean enjoying London's Buckingham Palace.

== Cast ==
- Sharon Cuneta as Sarah Gonzales
- John Estrada as Theodore "Teddy" Gonzales
- John Manalo as Paulo "Pau" Gonzales
- Rica Peralejo as Karen
- Jhong Hilario as Joseph
- Jim Muldoon as Nursing Home Doctor
- Saul Reichlin as William Morgan
- Claire Jeater as Margaret Morgan
- Matthew Rutherford as David Morgan
- Makisig Morales as Sean
- Mickey Ferriols as Julia
- Julia Montes as Gemma
- Lotlot De Leon as Betty
- Marita Zobel as Nemie
- Anita Linda† as Lola Miling
- Cheska Billiones as Sarah's student
- Consuelo Bilcliffe as Ditas

== Production ==
The film is based on real-life stories of Filipino caregivers abroad. Director Roño searched for stories of their lives abroad and personally talked to some who shared their experiences. Roño has friends who work as caregivers; their real-life scenarios were directly depicted in the film. The cast includes British actors, namely: Saul Reichlin, Matthew Rutherford, and Claire Jeater.

The rest of the film was shot in Roosevelt College Rodriguez. The scenes here include the part where Sarah was still studying as a caregiver student.

== Release ==
Caregiver is released under Star Cinema, which marks the company's fifteenth year in service. The year 2008 also marks Cuneta's 30th anniversary in the industry, and the film serves as an offering to fans.

The film was also released in international cinemas. Caregiver had its premiere in Alex Theatre in Glendale, California on May 31, 2008. Many Filipino caregivers working far from California travelled in to watch the film. It was released in late June and early July 2008 to several Middle East countries, including Qatar and Dubai.

== Awards ==
Year	Award-Giving Body	Category	Work	Result
2009	GMMSF Box-Office Entertainment Awards	Film Actress of the Year	Sharon Cuneta	Won

== Theme Song ==
Paalam Na by Sharon Cuneta
