= Madrasta (film) =

1996 drama film by Olivia M. Lamasan

- The poster of the restored version of the film, designed by Justin Besana
- Directed by: Olivia M. Lamasan
- Screenplay by: Ricky Lee; Olivia M. Lamasan
- Produced by: Malou N. Santos
- Starring: Sharon Cuneta; Christopher de Leon; Zsa Zsa Padilla
- Cinematography: Joe Batac
- Edited by: David G. Hukom
- Music by: Willy Cruz
- Production company: Star Cinema
- Distributed by: Star Cinema
- Release date: August 14, 1996
- Running time: 120 minutes
- Country: Philippines
- Languages: Filipino; English
- Box office: ₱70 million (₱280-₱320 million in 2026 Philippine peso)

Madrasta (lit. 'Stepmother') is a 1996 Philippine family drama film directed by Olivia M. Lamasan from a screenplay she co-wrote with Ricky Lee. Starring Sharon Cuneta and Christopher de Leon, the film revolves around a woman who struggles with her life as the stepmother of her husband's children from his first wife. The film clinched Cuneta a Grandslam Best Actress honor, recognized her as Best Actress from all major award-giving bodies in the Philippines, while its strong showing at the box-office conferred to Cuneta, another Box-Office Queen award.

Produced and distributed by Star Cinema, it was theatrically released on August 14, 1996, and it is Cuneta's first film outside her home studio, Viva Films. During its initial release, the film was a box office success where it became the highest-grossing film produced by the film studio at the time. In May 1998, it received an Asian television screening through an international movie channel, Cinemax. The film has been digitally remastered and restored by ABS-CBN Film Archives and Central Digital Lab.

The film is streaming online on YouTube.

== Plot ==
Edward and Sandra is a married couple, and had three children, Rachel, Ryan and Lisa. Knowing that Sandra is no longer happy and contented with her marriage, she decided to leave Edward and her children. Years later, Edward remarried Mariel after Edward's annulment to Sandra was approved. As soon as Mariel stepped foot inside the house, it was only Lisa who accepted and became close to her. As Mariel is having difficulty with Rachel who is always busy with her studies and friends, while Ryan would leave the house every night and came home early in the morning. Since Sandra left, Ryan became more rebellious. As time goes by, Mariel got pregnant. But she needed to cope with everyone in the household especially their housemaids. Also with Ryan who had trouble with his studies because of being rebellious. As Mariel decided to prepare for Rachel's birthday as one of their maids decided to leave after an argument, Rachel didn't appreciate her efforts.

Mariel soon gave birth to a son named Mikey. While Rachel had a hard time in her practicum at the company where Mariel is working. After Rachel madly scolded Mikey, Mariel confronted Edward about what she did to her son. In an intense exchange of conversation, Mariel decided to leave. At the funeral of Mariel's grandfather, whom she's very close to her, Edward asked Mariel to return for Lisa. Unfortunately, Sandra returned home, now already married and had a daughter. As Edward and Sandra met again, he became furious for abandoning him and their children. Ryan got involved in a vehicular accident after seeing Sandra. He wanted to be in the United States with Sandra, but she refused because Edward loves him. Rachel got pregnant to her boyfriend Dondi, and Edward wants him to marry Rachel. Edward then asked forgiveness to Ryan for everything that he did, while Mariel insisted to Sandra that she had no place for Edward's children. But Sandra said that Mariel is the one who is with them and told her to take care of them. On the wedding of Rachel and Dondi, Ryan finally accepted Mariel and she and Edward vowed that they will love and support each other.

== Cast ==
- Sharon Cuneta as Mariel Chavez
- Christopher de Leon as Edward Chavez
- Zsa Zsa Padilla as Sandra
- Nida Blanca as Fides
- Tita Muñoz as Ninay Chavez
- Eula Valdez as Irene
- Claudine Barretto as Rachel Chavez
- Patrick Garcia as Ryan Chavez
- Camille Prats as Liza Chavez
- Rico Yan as Dodie
- Teresa Loyzaga as Luchie
- Cris Villanueva as Dan
- Koko Trinidad as Lolo
- Vangie Labalan as Manang
- Cheng Avellana as Lenlen
- Mai Guevarra as a classmate of Liza

== Reception ==
=== Accolades ===
Year	Award-Giving Body	Category	Recipient	Result
1997	FAMAS Awards	Best Actress	Sharon Cuneta	Won
1997	FAMAS Awards	Best Child Actor	Patrick Garcia	Won
1997	FAMAS Awards	Best Actor	Christopher De Leon	Nominated
1997	FAMAS Awards	Best Child Actress	Camille Prats	Nominated
1997	FAMAS Awards	Best Director	Olivia M. Lamasan	Nominated
1997	FAMAS Awards	Best Editing	Edgardo Vinarao & Rudy Hukom	Nominated
1997	FAMAS Awards	Best Movie Theme Song	"Hanggang Kailan Kita Mamahalin?" by Willy Cruz	Nominated
1997	FAMAS Awards	Best Picture	Madrasta	Nominated
1997	FAMAS Awards	Best Screenplay	Ricardo Lee & Olivia M. Lamasan	Nominated
1997	FAMAS Awards	Best Supporting Actress	Zsa Zsa Padilla	Nominated
1997	FAMAS Awards	Best Supporting Actor	Koko Trinidad	Nominated
1997	Film Academy of the Philippines Awards (FAP Awards)	Best Actress	Sharon Cuneta	Won
1997	Film Academy of the Philippines Awards (FAP Awards)	Best Actor	Christopher de Leon	Nominated
1997	Film Academy of the Philippines Awards (FAP Awards)	Best Director	Olivia M. Lamasan	Nominated
1997	Film Academy of the Philippines Awards (FAP Awards)	Best Editing	Edgardo Vinarao & Rudy Hukom	Nominated
1997	Film Academy of the Philippines Awards (FAP Awards)	Best Musical Score		Nominated
1997	Film Academy of the Philippines Awards (FAP Awards)	Best Original Song	"Hanggang Kailan Kita Mamahalin?" by Willy Cruz	Won
1997	Film Academy of the Philippines Awards (FAP Awards)	Best Picture	Madrasta	Nominated
1997	Film Academy of the Philippines Awards (FAP Awards)	Best Screenplay	Ricardo Lee & Olivia M. Lamasan	Nominated
1997	Film Academy of the Philippines Awards (FAP Awards)	Best Supporting Actor	Patrick Garcia	Nominated
1997	Film Academy of the Philippines Awards (FAP Awards)	Best Supporting Actress	Zsa Zsa Padilla	Nominated
1997	Gawad Urian Awards	Best Actress	Sharon Cuneta tied with Nora Aunor for "Bakit May Kahapon Pa? (1996)"	Won
1997	Gawad Urian Awards	Best Actor	Christopher De Leon	Nominated
1997	Gawad Urian Awards	Best Direction	Olivia M. Lamasan	Nominated
1997	Gawad Urian Awards	Best Editing	Edgardo Vinarao and John David Hukom	Nominated
1997	Gawad Urian Awards	Best Picture	Madrasta	Won
1997	Gawad Urian Awards	Best Screenplay	Ricardo Lee and Olivia Lamasan	Nominated
1997	PMPC Star Awards for Movies	Movie Actor of the Year	Christopher de Leon	Won
1997	PMPC Star Awards for Movies	Movie Actress of the Year	Sharon Cuneta	Won
1997	PMPC Star Awards for Movies	Director of the Year	Olivia M. Lamasan	Won
1997	PMPC Star Awards for Movies	Movie Theme Song of the Year	"Hanggang Kailan Kita Mamahalin?" by Willy Cruz	Nominated
1997	PMPC Star Awards for Movies	Movie of the Year	Madrasta	Nominated
1997	PMPC Star Awards for Movies	Best Screenplay	Ricardo Lee and Olivia Lamasan	Nominated
1997	PMPC Star Awards for Movies	Musical Scorer of the Year		Nominated
1997	PMPC Star Awards for Movies	Movie Supporting Actor of the Year	Patrick Garcia	Nominated
1997	PMPC Star Awards for Movies	Movie Supporting Actress of the Year	Zsa Zsa Padilla	Nominated
