= Rey Valera =

Filipino singer, songwriter, music director and host

- Valera in 2007
- Born: Reynaldo Valera Guardiano; May 4, 1954 (age 72); Meycauayan, Bulacan, Philippines
- Occupations: Singer, songwriter, arranger, record producer
- Years active: 1977–2024
- Political party: PDP–Laban (2012–13)
- Musical career
- Genres: Manila sound
- Instruments: Vocals · bass guitar · guitar · keyboards
- Labels: Vicor Music; Star Music (music rights)
- Member of: The Greatest Hitmakers
- Formerly of: Electric Hair Band

Reynaldo Valera Guardiano (Tagalog: [reɪ bɐˈlɛɾa]; born May 4, 1954), better known as Rey Valera, is a Filipino singer, songwriter, music director, film scorer, and television host. He wrote and produced songs that were recorded by various singers, most notably Sharon Cuneta. Valera is regarded as one of the pillars and icons of Original Pilipino Music (OPM). He was a judge on the singing contest Sing Galing! (2021). Valera was also a former head judge of the singing contest segment "Tawag ng Tanghalan" in the variety noontime show, It's Showtime (2016–2021).

== Career ==
Valera started his recording career in 1977 after becoming a band member from a group called Electric Hair Band for seven years. He waxed his first single as a solo singer – songwriter with the song "Ako si Superman", which he wrote supposedly for Rico J. Puno. His former boss at Vicor Records gave him the opportunity to sing his song and at the same time hired him as one of Vicor's in-house producers. Valera wrote the song "Mr. D.J." and "Kahit Maputi na ang Buhok Ko" for Sharon Cuneta as part of the album DJ's Pet, released in 1978.

Valera also made songs for other artists such as Rico Puno's "Sorry Na, Pwede Ba", "Daigdig Ng Ala-ala"; Geraldine's "Pangako"; Pol Enriquez' "Ayoko na Sa 'Yo" and many more. While he made songs for his peers, he made albums for himself such as Naaalala Ka, Rey Valera Vol. 2, Walang Kapalit, Hello, The Rey Valera Christmas Album, Gabay Mo Ako, Rey Valera's Greatest Hits Vol. 1, Rey Valera's Greatest Hits Vol. 2, Pirapirasong Ala-ala, Sa Kabila Ng Lahat, Kung Sakaling Iibig Muli, FM Ka, AM Ako, Home Sweet Home, Ang Mahalaga, etc. Most of these albums made golds and platinums.

Recently, Vicor Music Corporation compiled Valera's recorded songs in their library in a 4-disc album entitled, Walang Kapalit, as part of Vicor's 40th anniversary.

He was finally inducted to the Philippines Eastwood City Walk of Fame in 2009.

He won the MYX Magna Award 2015 in the 2015 MYX Music Awards.

=== Mr. DJ and Sharon Cuneta ===
One of his initial projects as a request from Tito Sotto who was the vice president of the Vicor Music Corporation at that time was to make a song for a twelve-year-old mayor's daughter named Sharon Cuneta. It was a daunting challenge, as Rey initially could not figure out what kind song would be fitting for her; she was too young to be taken seriously to be given a love song, and a bit too old to be given a nursery rhyme.

"Pansin ko fleeting ang life, atsaka moment ka lang in time.

Kaya ma-swerte na lang ako meron akong konting laban sa time...

Hindi niya ako mabubura... May kanta ako eh"

TRANSLATED FROM TAGALOG

"I've noticed that life is fleeting, and we're just a moment in time.

I'm very lucky that I have something I can use against time...

"I have my songs with me...I will always be remembered"

Rey Valera, quote from an interview on Balikbayan QTV-11, July 2008

It dawned upon Rey to write a song about the people who were responsible for playing songs on the radio; the DJs. Wherever radio station the song would be submitted in, it was almost always guaranteed that it would be played as it was their song. The song, Mr. DJ, made remarkable sales on the chart.

Sharon stated in a recent interview by Deborah Kan in Star News Asia, that she has been always thankful for and grateful to Rey, for writing her first hit song. "Mr. DJ".

The two have been friends ever since, and in 1992, Sharon paid tribute to her favorite composer when she recorded Sharon Sings Valera.

When Sharon Cuneta and her then husband Gabby Concepcion separated, Rey composed the song, "Kahit Wala Ka Na" (Even When You're Gone). When Sharon and Rey met at Cinema Audio, she asked why he was not writing songs for her anymore. Rey replied that he did write one for her and submitted the song to VIVA for it to be an inspiration or a battleground for Sharon. Both of them found out that the song has been shelved for two years at VIVA. Sharon immediately recorded the song and used it in her movie, "Single Mother"(former title). It was retitled to "Kahit Wala Ka Na".

=== Rey Valera's impostor ===
In 1983, Valera faced one of the worst challenges of both his career, and personal life; an impostor was using his name and was committing crimes, among them were car-napping and rape. The list even extended to marrying numerous women, and even petty crimes like "borrowing" money and personal items, all under Rey Valera's name. Rey made numerous newspaper statements announcing that there is an imposter posing as him. Rey also wrote and released a song entitled, "My Fans Are in Trouble" to warn his fans through the medium of music, with the lyrics depicting his helplessness to stop this impostor. What Rey feared most was not the money, but the physical harm people the impostor had fooled might do to him. Ultimately in 1984, Rey decided to quit show business at the peak of his career to protect his fans and also to make up for the time he lost with his family during his fame. When Rey made a comeback in 1988, he wore his hair long so that his impostor (who had kinky hair), would have a harder time posing as him if the impostor ever resurfaced. The impostor has never been heard from ever since.

Valera now talks about the impostor topic on less serious, even humorous tone, to help forget the traumatic experience it had caused. Looking back, he even dubbed his impostor "Rey Bolero" (Rey the Deceiver / Smooth Talker) when he talks about it to his friends and interviews, which was also mentioned on the "Na-Scam Ka Na Ba" interview on the Filipino television channel QTV 11 which aired around September 2006.

==== Bubble Gang parody ====
In May 2008, a friendlier, funnier impostor had emerged on the Filipino television show Bubble Gang, played by comedian/parodist Michael V. He even used "Rey Bolero" as his screen name. A segment of the show featured Michael V. as Rey Bolero, singing Mas Tanga 'ko Sa'yo ("I'm Dumber Than You") – A parody of one of Rey Valera's well known songs, Pangako Sa'yo ("I Promise You"). His costume was even patterned after Rey Valera's late 1970s attire.

The idea proved to be a hit, and a second Rey Valera song was soon used on the same show and segment, also by Michael V. himself. The song, "Kung Kailangan Mo Ako" ("If You Need Me"), was parodied into Kung Kailangan Mo Bato ("If You Need A Stone / To Get Stoned"—a slang use of the word "stone", as in getting high)

On October 31 of the same year, Rey Valera, and Michael V. as Rey Bolero (now mimicking Valera's clothes and hairstyle at the time) performed a duet and was one of the highlights of the heavily promoted, "taped as live", two-part Bubble Gang 13th Anniversary special. A narration was heard before the two artists entered the stage; "Do the singers that Michael V. impersonate ever get angry?" – (translated from Filipino). They sang a medley of the two previously mentioned parodied songs. The segment ended with Valera mock-swinging his guitar at Michael V., and the former mock-chasing the latter towards the backstage.

=== Theme songs for soap operas ===
Valera's songs are also favorite titles and theme songs of soap operas like Ula, Batang Gubat ("Malayo Pa Ang Umaga"), Sa Sandaling Kailangan Mo Ako ("Kung Kailangan Mo Ako"), Pangako Sa 'Yo ("Pangako") of ABS-CBN.

Recently, Valera's song's have been revived as theme songs for soap operas such as ABS-CBN's Maging Sino Ka Man (which has spawned a second book, Maging Sino Ka Man: Ang Pagbabalik), Walang Kapalit, Tayong Dalawa, Agua Bendita, Juan Dela Cruz and GMA's Maging Sino Ka Man. All of these shows have turned into a massive hit, making them top-rating and be part of every Filipino's lives.

=== Writing music and songs for movies ===
Valera was film scoring movies during his singing career, but after the trouble his impostor has caused, Rey focused on his musical directing career. He particularly liked scoring music for action films, giving fight scenes and chase sequences fast paced, rock-themed music, which reflects his roots as a rock band member.

Rey's songs made marks also as theme songs and movie titles. These include several Sharon Cuneta movies such as Maging Sino Ka Man, Pangako sa 'Yo, Kahit Wala Ka Na, Tayong Dalawa; Sinasamba Kita, Romansa, Hiwalay; Carnap King, Barumbado, and Baby Ama; Pasong Tirad, The Gregorio del Pilar Story, Tampisaw.

There are very few people are aware that Rey wrote music for movies, even fewer are aware that he also wrote music for R-18 "bold" films. He accepted making music for movies and considered it an opportunity, as these projects usually pitted his songwriting skills to follow fresh and often unusual themes and topics, often deviating from pop love songs which he was usually typecast into.

The theme song "Ambon" (Raindrop) from the film Tampisaw emphasizes on the singer's hunger and deprivation of love, and that a single "raindrop" of love would be enough for her to live on.

The theme song "Nagpapanggap" (Pretending/Deceiving) from the film Kerida (The Mistress) depicts a person's awareness that her lover is only pretending to love her, and yet she has this pragmatic acceptance and is even thankful that she was loved, no matter how false that love may be.

The theme song "Sa Gitna ng Buhay Ko" (In The Middle of My Life) from the film Naglalayag (Silent Passage) follows the movie's theme of a middle-aged woman falling in love with a man half her age. The song relates to her life as the times of the day, asking questions such as, "why did love arrive at only NOON?"

=== The Greatest Hitmakers ===
In 2002, Rey reunited with his contemporaries Rico J. Puno and Hajji Alejandro in a series of concerts called "Greatest Hits", highlighting the music of their own time. They also launched a VCD recording of their concert. Nonoy Zuñiga and Marco Sison joined the group in the following year. The group continues to perform both locally and internationally

Although they were formally named "The Greatest Hits", the group felt that using the name "The Greatest Hitmakers" was more proper, as the former referred to the 'songs' and not the group members themselves. The group has successfully performed even with the absence of one or two members, usually concentrating on a core trio group (e.g. Rey, Hajji, Rico / Rey, Hajji, Marco / Rey, Rico, Marco) and varies between concert to concert, depending on each member's availability. This flexibility of the group's roster combined with miscommunication with the each show's promoter and other reasons has often led to various names for the group such as "The Hitmakers", "The Greatest Hits", "The Great Hitmakers" "GH5", "GH4" and such.

=== Saling Ket ===
In July 2005, Valera released the music album "Panghabangbuhay", with his children's band called "Saling Ket". Whenever possible, Rey has been performing with them in almost all of his performances and still continues to do so.

=== Induction to Bulacan's Walk of Fame ===
Rey Valera at the Hardin ng mga Bayani at Sining, Malolos City, Bulacan

On November 9, 2006, Valera was inducted to Bulacan's own Walk of Fame, in the Hardin ng mga Bayani at Sining (The Garden of the Heroes and Arts/Artists), Malolos City, Bulacan.

Rey was among the few Bulakeños who was given the title of "Alagad ng Sining at Kultura ng Bulacan", loosely translated as "Disciple of the Arts and Culture of Bulacan", or simply put, Great Artist of Bulacan.

Award and Handprint

An inductee was given a tile with his/her name on it, and a small pile of a then wet cement to leave a hand print. The names on the Walk of Fame embody the Bulakeños who have brought pride to Bulacan in the fields of arts and culture.

=== Philippines Eastwood City Walk of Fame Inductee Winner ===
In December 2009, Valera is finally inducted to the Philippines Eastwood City Walk of Fame for contributing his singing & composing songs. Philippines Eastwood City Walk of Fame is similar to the Hollywood Walk of Fame in California, USA.

=== First Asean IKon Champion – "Pangako" ===
On August 17, 2007, Sharon Magdayao won the First Asean IKon Champion with her interpretation of Valera's hit song, "Pangako". The song was used as a theme song for ABS-CBN's soap opera TV series, Pangako Sa 'Yo (2000) and its 2015 remake, which was also sung by Morales.

=== The Legends of OPM ===
The Legends of OPM (March 5, 2009). Left to Right: Claire dela Fuente, Eva Eugenio, Joey Albert, Rey Valera, Rico Puno, and Nonoy Zuñiga on December 30, 2008.

Rey once again performed with Rico J. Puno, and Nonoy Zuñiga, along with Claire dela Fuente, Eva Eugenio and Joey Albert at the Philippine International Convention Center under the name, Legends of OPM. Like its predecessor group, "The Greatest Hitmakers", the concept proved to be a hit, and a repeat performance was done on March 5 of the following year.

=== MYX Magna Award 2015 Winner ===
He won as the MYX Magna Award 2015 Winner for contributing his success as a composer, guitarist, musical director & singer and also a performer.

=== Politics ===
Valera ran for vice mayor of Meycauayan under the PDP–Laban party in 2013 Philippine general election, but lost.

== Movie musical directions and theme songs ==
Legend:
( ) music score only
( * ) music score and theme song
( ** ) theme song only
( *** ) movie title and theme song
( **** ) music score, movie title, theme song (song title same as movie title)

| Movie | Actor/actress | Theme song used |
|---|---|---|
| Strangers in Paradise **** | Lloyd Samartino/Snooky Serna | |
| Hello Young Lovers **** | Gabby Concepcion/Snooky Serna | |
| Romansa * | Vilma Santos/Edu Manzano | |
| Cristal **** | Lampel Cojuangco | |
| Exploitation **** | Alma Moreno | |
| Kabiyak * | Vilma Santos | |
| Annie Sabungera **** | Nora Aunor/Rey Valera/ Ace Vergel | |
| G.I. Baby * | Lampel Cojuangco | |
| Stepsisters * | Lorna Tolentino/Rio Locsin | Tayong Dalawa |
| Hiwalay * | Vilma Santos/Dindo Fernando | |
| Sinasamba Kita **** | Vilma Santos/Phillip Salvador | |
| Burgis **** | Gabby Concepcion | |
| Init o Lamig | Charito Solis/Elizabeth Oropesa | |
| Juan Balutan | Niño Muhlach/Kristina Paner | |
| Pusong Uhaw | Gina Alajar/Mark Gil | |
| Abigael **** | Cherie Gil/Alma Moreno/Gabby Concepcion | |
| Amang Capulong: Anak ng Tondo II (1992) *** | Monsour Del Rosario/Sharmaine Arnaiz/Rina Reyes | |
| Tatak ng Cebu II: Emong Verdadero (Bala ng Ganti) (1992)*** | Ferdinand Galang/Jackie Lou Blanco | |
| My Prince Charming * | Janice de Belen/Gabby Concepcion | |
| Kung Kasalanan Man ** | Dina Bonnevie | |
| Abot Hanggang Sukdulan ** | Snooky Serna | |
| Kahit Wala Ka Na *** | Sharon Cuneta/Richard Gomez | |
| Babangon Ako at Dudurugin Kita ** | Sharon Cuneta/Christopher de Leon | |
| Sa Kabila Ng Lahat *** | Dina Bonnevie/Nanette Medved | |
| Anak ni Baby Ama (1990) *** | Robin Padilla | |
| Barumbado (1990) | Robin Padilla | |
| Baricuatro | Sonny Parsons | |
| Boy Amores | Anthony Alonzo | |
| Carnap King | Robin Padilla | |
| UZI Brothers (1989) | Ronnie Ricketts/Sonny Parsons | |
| Boy Kristiano | Bobby Zhornach | |
| To Mama With Love * | Julie Vega/Janice de Belen | |
| Noel Juico (1991)** | Raymart Santiago | |
| Hahalik Ka Rin Sa Lupa | Sonny Parsons | |
| Isang Salop Na Bala | Palito | |
| Multiple Murder | Jess Lapid Jr. | |
| Lumaban Ka, Sagot Kita Sa Diyos * | Julio Diaz/Tommy Abuel | |
| Asiong Salonga 3 | E.R./Ejercito | |
| Mana Sa Ina | Rita Avila | |
| Iisa-isahin Ko Kayo (1990)* | Ronnie Ricketts | |
| Sisingilin Ko Ng Dugo (1990)* | Patrick dela Rosa | |
| Kumander Tata | Jess Lapid Jr. | |
| Bahala na Gang (1987) | Sonny Parsons | |
| Ambush (1987) | Ronnie Ricketts | |
| Salisi Gang | Sonny Parsons | |
| Masikip Ang Langit | Jess Lapid Jr. | |
| Kalawang Sa Bakal | Ricky Davao | |
| Donggalo Massacre (1986) *** | Bong Revilla | |
| Tayong Dalawa *** | Sharon Cuneta/Gabby Concepcion | |
| Kung Tayo'y Magkakalayo *** | Sheryll Cruz/Romnick Sarmenta | |
| Una Kang Naging Akin ** | Sharon Cuneta/Gabby Concepcion | Kung Kailangan Mo Ako |
| Hari Ng Selda * | Robin Padilla/ Angelika dela Cruz | Batang Bilanggo |
| Walang Kapalit *** | Sharon Cuneta/Richard Gomez | |
| Tampisaw * | Aleck Bovick | Ambon |
| Masarap Na Pugad * | Aleck Bovick/Gary Estrada | Bangka |
| Kerida * | Aleck Bovick/Mark Gil/Gardo Versoza | Nagpapanggap |
| Makamundo * | Gardo Versoza | Mundo ng Makamundo |
| Mapupulang Labi | Maye Tongco | |
| Sex Scandal | Allen Dizon | |
| U-Belt * | Aleck Bovick | Butas ng Karayom |
| Naglalayag ** | Nora Aunor | Sa Gitna ng Buhay Ko |

== Chronology ==
| Date | Comments |
|---|---|
| 1977 | Wrote and sung "Ako Si Superman" November: wrote the song "Mr. D.J." and "Kahit Maputi Na Ang Buhok Ko" for Sharon Cuneta. Both songs received Gold Record Awards. |
| 1978 | 'October: Received his first Gold Record Award for single entitled "Naaalala Ka". He wrote the song "Sorry Na, Puwede Ba" for Rico Puno while doing his first album that same year. |
| 1979 | Joined Blackgold Records, a sister company of Vicor Music Corporation, as a record producer. He rose to the position of assistant Vice President for Research and Composition. That same year he waxed his record album with hits such as "Maging Sino Ka Man", "Malayo Pa Ang Umaga", etc. Tried to venture in music directional jobs. |
| 1980 | Rey Valera started writing songs for other singers again, this time for Geraldine with the song "Pangako", and Lirio Vital's "Naniniwala Ako Sa Iyo". |
| 1981 | February: he was awarded the Gold Record Award for the hit single "Kung Kailangan Mo Ako". June: he received the Gold Album Award from a compilation of his past hits titled "Rey Valera's Greatest Hits". October: he represented the Philippines as a songwriter in the first Asean Song Festival held in Kuala Lumpur, Malaysia. he was also awarded the Gold Record Award for the album entitled, "Walang Kapalit". November: bagged the title "Juke Box King of the Year". |
| 1982 | Received "The King of Tagalog Songs" award. Tried the movies via Annie Sabungera with Nora Aunor. |
| 1983 | March: He sang the song "Gabay Mo Ako", as one of the finalist in the Metro Manila Pop Music Festival. It was in March also when his long playing album "Hello" became another Gold Record. April: Received the title "Entertainer of the Year". May: Held the title, "King of Tagalog Songs" for the second time. December: Rey Valera's Greatest Hits album became Platinum Record. This was also the year that an impostor used Rey Valera's name to his disastrous advantage. |
| 1984 | Transferred to Wea Records and waxed his last album. He wrote another gold hit song entitled, "Pira-pirasong Alaala" for another female singer. Dropped show business. Went back to his family to make up for lost days. He joined the movie industry now as a musical director. |
| 1985–1986 | The country saw the economic crisis that led to the downfall of the local music industry. During these times, Rey Valera relied heavily on his movie scoring works, devoted his time to his promotion business, while anticipating the comeback for the Golden Era of the Philippine Music Industry. |
| 1988 | TV Personality, comedian, and fellow Bulakeño Bert Marcelo persuaded Rey to make a comeback in live performances and join him in a series of concerts called "Hatid Saya" in Europe and Middle East. |
| 1989 | Began training and introducing aspiring composers to professional songwriting and studioworks. |
| 1992 | Joined Sharon Cuneta in her Mega concert in U.S. and Japan. |
| 1993–1994 | Member of the board of directors – FILSCAP |
| 1994 | Nominee, Best Original Song Category – "Kung Tayo'y Magkakalayo". |
| 2000 | Joined forces with Freddie Aguilar, Mike Hanopol, Vehnee Saturno, and formed the group, SAGA (Songs And Generations After). The group recorded one album, and performed one major concert in Canada. It was their first and last concert as SAGA, and the group disbanded months later. |
| 2002 | Merged with Rico Puno and Hajji Alejandro, in a series of "The Greatest Hits" concerts. |
| 2003 | The group "Greatest Hits 5" or "GH5" was formed with Rey Valera, Hajji Alejandro, Rico Puno, Marco Sison and Nonoy Zuñiga which continues to perform locally and internationally. Recipient, Lifetime Achievement for Music 8th Tining Awards from The National Press Club |
| 2004 | Participant, Travel Advocacy Campaign, Department of Tourism, "Biyahe Tayo", WOW Philippines. Winner, Best Song Category, "Sa Gitna Ng Buhay Ko" for the movie "Naglalayag", Metro Manila Film festival |
| 2005 | July: Released the "Panghabangbuhay" album with his children's band called "Saling Ket". Awardee, 18th Awit Awards Dangal ng Musikang Pilipino – Lifetime Achievement Award, given by The Philippine Association of Recording Industries |
| 2006 | November 9: Inducted to Bulacan's own Walk of Fame, in the "Hardin ng Sining at Bayani", Malolos, Bulacan. |
| 2007 | August 17: The 1st Asean IKon Music competition was held, and Vina Morales won as the 1st Asean IKon Champion with her interpretation of Rey's song, "Pangako". |
| 2009 | December: He was finally inducted to the Philippines Eastwood City Walk Of Fame. |
| 2015 | March 17: He was awarded as the MYX Magna Award in the recent 2015 MYX Music Awards. |
| 2016 | Punong Hurado in Tawag ng Tanghalan sa Showtime!. |

== Discography ==
=== Albums ===
==== Studio albums ====
- Naaalala Ka
- Volume 2
- Walang Kalapit
- The Rey Valera's Christmas Album
- Hello
- Gabay Mo Ako
- Pira-Pirasong Ala-Ala
- Sa Kabila Ng Lahat
- Kung Sakaling Iibig Muli
- FM Ka, AM Ako

==== Compilation albums ====
- Rey Valera's Greatest Hits Vol. 1
- Rey Valera's Greatest Hits Vol. 2
- Once Again... with Rico J. Puno, Marco Sison and Rey Valera Vol. 1 (with Rico J. Puno & Marco Sison) (2003, Vicor)
- 18 Greatest Hits: Rey Valera (2009, Vicor)

==== Compilation appearances ====
- 18 Inspirational Love Songs (2009, Viva Records)

=== Singles ===
- "Maging Sino Ka Man" (also covered by Sharon Cuneta, Nyoy Volante duet with Arnee Hidalgo, Erik Santos, Vina Morales, Martin Nievera, Kim Molina & Hannah Precillas)
- "Tayong Dalawa" (also covered by Gary V. & Kiko Machine)
- "Kung Kailangan Mo Ako" (also covered by Ara Mina, Randy Santiago, Piolo Pascual and Gary V.)
- "Ako Si Superman" (also covered by Sound Band & Coco Martin used in an action series, “FPJ's Ang Probinsyano”)
- "Naaalala Ka" (also covered by Shamrock & Jericho Rosales)
- "Malayo Pa Ang Umaga" (Originally by Verde & Clarino in 1979)
- "Pangako" (also covered by Vina Morales & Daniel Padilla)
- "Sinasamba Kita" (also covered by Sharon Cuneta, Martin Nievera, Ogie Alcasid & Jed Madela)
- "Walang Kapalit" (also covered by Piolo Pascual, Dingdong Avandazo & Gary V.)
- "Kung Sakaling Iibigin Muli"
- "Kung Tayo'y Magkakalayo" (also covered by Gary V.)
- "Kumusta Ka" (also covered by Blue Ketchup Band)

== Music videos ==
- Kung Sakaling Iibigin Muli (shot entirely in San Francisco California & also directed by Dandin Ranillo)

== See also ==
- Kahit Maputi Na ang Buhok Ko, 2023 biographical musical film about the life of Valera
