= Sharon (talk show) =

Philippine television talk show

- Title card (2006–2007)
- Genre: Talk show
- Directed by: Rowell Santiago; Johnny Manahan
- Presented by: Sharon Cuneta
- Country of origin: Philippines
- Original language: Filipino
- No. of episodes: 549

Production
- Running time: 60 minutes (1998–2001); 45 minutes (2006–10); 90 minutes (2001–04)

Original release
- Network: ABS-CBN
- Release: September 6, 1998 – May 9, 2004
- Release: February 26, 2006 – October 3, 2010

Sharon is a Philippine television talk show broadcast by ABS-CBN. Hosted by Sharon Cuneta, it premiered on September 6, 1998 to May 9, 2004. The show returned on February 26, 2006. The show concluded on October 3, 2010, with a total of 549 episodes.

== Host ==
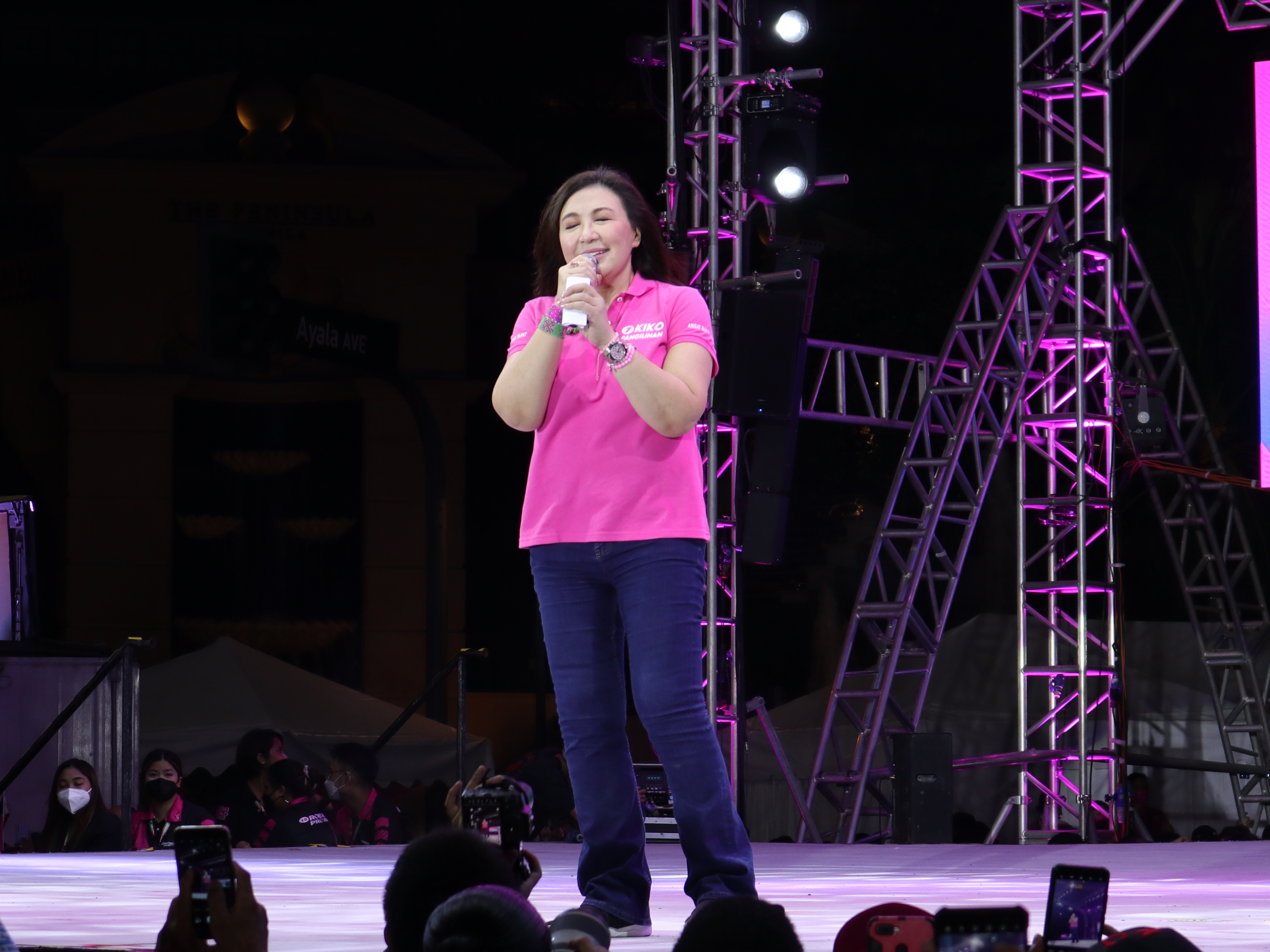
Sharon Cuneta served as the host.

- Sharon Cuneta

== Accolades ==
Accolades received by Sharon
Year	Award	Category	Recipient	Result	Ref.
2007	Asian Television Awards	Best Entertainment Presenter	Sharon Cuneta	Won	
2007	29th Catholic Mass Media Awards	Best Entertainment Program	Sharon	Won	
2008	22nd PMPC Star Awards for Television	Best Celebrity Talk Show	Sharon	Nominated	
