= List of VMX original programming =

VMX is a Philippine subscription video on demand over-the-top streaming service owned and operated by Viva Communications. It features original Filipino movies and series. Starting as Vivamax in 2021, the service was rebranded as VMX in October 2024.

VMX offers original content which is pivoted to more risqué, edgy and adult themes for mature audiences.

This list includes films and series premiered and released exclusively on the streaming service.

== Original movies ==
=== 2021 ===
Release Date		Title	Production company	Cast and crew	Ref.
J A N U A R Y	29	Paglaki Ko, Gusto Kong Maging Pornstar	Viva Films / VinCentiments	Darryl Yap (director); Alma Moreno, Rosanna Roces, Ara Mina, Maui Taylor, AJ Raval, Ana Jalandoni, Rose Van Ginkel	
A P R I L	30	Death of a Girlfriend	Viva Films	Yam Laranas (director); Diego Loyzaga, AJ Raval	
M A Y	28	Kaka	Viva Films / Five 2 Seven Entertainment Production	GB Sampedro (director); Sunshine Guimary, Ion Perez, Jerald Napoles	
J U L Y	9	Silab	3:16 Media Network	Joel Lamangan (director); Jason Abalos, Marco Gomez, Cloe Barreto	
J U L Y	30	Nerisa	Viva Films	Lawrence Fajardo (director); Cindy Miranda, Aljur Abrenica	
A U G U S T	27	Taya	Viva Films	Roman Perez Jr. (director); AJ Raval, Sean de Guzman, Angeli Khang, Jela Cuenca	
S E P T E M B E R	3	69+1	Viva Films / VinCentiments	Darryl Yap (director); Janno Gibbs, Maui Taylor, Rose Van Ginkel	
S E P T E M B E R	10	The Housemaid	Viva Films	Roman Perez Jr. (director); Kylie Verzosa, Albert Martinez, Jaclyn Jose	
S E P T E M B E R	24	Paraluman	Viva Films / Mesh Lab	Yam Laranas (director); Rhen Escaño, Jao Mapa	
O C T O B E R	8	Shoot Shoot! Di Ko Siya Titigilan!	Viva Films	Al Tantay (director); Andrew E., AJ Raval, Sunshine Guimary	
O C T O B E R	15	Sarap Mong Patayin	Viva Films / VinCentiments	Darryl Yap (director); Ariella Arida, Lassy Marquez, Kit Thompson	
O C T O B E R	22	House Tour	Viva Films	Roman Perez Jr. (director); Mark Anthony Fernandez, Diego Loyzaga, Marco Gomez, Rafa Siguion-Reyna, Sunshine Guimary, Cindy Miranda	
N O V E M B E R	12	Mahjong Nights	Viva Films	Lawrence Fajardo (director); Angeli Khang, Sean de Guzman	
N O V E M B E R	26	My Husband, My Lover	Viva Films	McArthur Alejandre (director); Kylie Verzosa, Marco Gumabao, Cindy Miranda	
D E C E M B E R	3	Pornstar 2: Pangalawang Putok	Viva Films / VinCentiments	Darryl Yap (director); Alma Moreno, Rosanna Roces, Maui Taylor, Ara Mina, Ayanna Misola, Cara Gonzales, Stephanie Raz, Sab Aggabao	
D E C E M B E R	10	Palitan	Viva Films / Center Stage Productions	Brillante Mendoza (director); Luis Hontiveros, Rash Flores, Jela Cuenca, Cara Gonzales	
D E C E M B E R	17	Crush Kong Curly	Viva Films / Five 2 Seven Entertainment Production	GB Sampedro (director); AJ Raval, Wilbert Ross	
D E C E M B E R	24	Eva	Viva Films / Great Media Productions	Jeffrey Hidalgo (director); Angeli Khang, Sab Aggabao, Marco Gomez, Ivan Padilla, Angelica Cervantes, Quinn Carillo	
D E C E M B E R	31	Sanggano, Sanggago’t Sanggwapo 2: Aussie! Aussie (O Sige)	Viva Films	Al Tantay (director); Andrew E., Dennis Padilla, Janno Gibbs	

=== 2022 ===
Release Date		Title	Production company	Cast and crew	Ref.
J A N U A R Y	7	Siklo	Viva Films	Roman Perez Jr. (director); Vince Rillon, Christine Bermas	
J A N U A R Y	14	Hugas	Viva Films	Roman Perez Jr. (director); Sean de Guzman, AJ Raval	
J A N U A R Y	19	Sisid	Viva Films / Center Stage Productions	Brillante Mendoza (director); Kylie Verzosa, Vince Rillon, Christine Bermas, Paolo Gumabao	
J A N U A R Y	21	Reroute	Viva Films	Lawrence Fajardo (director); John Arcilla, Cindy Miranda, Sid Lucero, Nathalie Hart	
J A N U A R Y	28	Silip sa Apoy	Viva Films	McArthur Alejandre (director); Ricky Lee (screenplay); Angeli Khang, Paolo Gumabao, Sid Lucero, Jela Cuenca	
F E B R U A R Y	4	Kinsenas, Katapusan	Viva Films / Five 2 Seven Entertainment Production	GB Sampedro (director); Ayanna Misola, Joko Diaz, Jamilla Obispo, Janelle Tee	
F E B R U A R Y	11	The Wife	Viva Films	Denise O'Hara (director); Louise delos Reyes, Diego Loyzaga, Cara Gonzales	
F E B R U A R Y	18	Boy Bastos	Viva Films	Victor Villanueva (director); Wilbert Ross, Rose Van Ginkel, Robb Guinto, Jela Cuenca	
M A R C H	11	Adarna Gang	Viva Films / Pelipula Productions	Jon Red (director); Coleen Garcia, JC Santos, Diego Loyzaga, Ronnie Lazaro, Mark Anthony Fernandez, Jay Manalo, Shamaine Buencamino, Mickey Ferriols	
M A R C H	18	Moonlight Butterfly	3:16 Media Network	Joel Lamangan (director); Christine Bermas, Kit Thompson, Albie Casiño	
M A R C H	25	X-Deal 2	Viva Films	Lawrence Fajardo (director); Robb Guinto, Angela Morena, Josef Elizalde	
A P R I L	1	Island of Desire	Viva Films	Joel Lamangan (director); Christine Bermas, Jela Cuenca, Sean De Guzman	
A P R I L	29	Kaliwaan	Viva Films / Center Stage Productions	Daniel Palacio (director); AJ Raval, Vince Rillon, Mark Anthony Fernandez, Denise Esteban	
M A Y	6	Doblado	Viva Films / Five 2 Seven Entertainment Production	GB Sampedro (director); Denise Esteban, Josef Elizalde, Mark Anthony Fernandez, Katrina Dovey, Gwen Garci	
M A Y	13	Putahe	Viva Films	Roman Perez Jr. (director); Ayanna Misola, Janelle Tee	
M A Y	20	Ikaw Lang ang Mahal	Viva Films	Richard Somes (director); Kylie Verzosa, Zanjoe Marudo, Cara Gonzales	
M A Y	27	Pusoy	Viva Films / Center Stage Productions	Phil Giordano (director); Angeli Khang, Vince Rillon, Janelle Tee, Baron Geisler	
J U N E	3	Breathe Again	Viva Films / RF Film Productions	Raffy Francisco (director); Ariella Arida, Tony Labrusca	
J U N E	10	Secrets	Viva Films / LargaVista Entertainment	Jose Javier Reyes (director/screenplay); Janelle Tee, Felix Roco, Benz Sangalang, Denise Esteban	
J U N E	24	Virgin Forest	Viva Films / Center Stage Productions	Brillante Mendoza (director); Sid Lucero, Angeli Khang, Vince Rillon, Robb Guinto, Katrina Dovey	
J U L Y	1	Biyak	3:16 Media Network	Joel Lamangan (director); Angelica Cervantes, Albie Casiño, Quinn Carillo, Vance Larena	
J U L Y	8	Kitty K7	Viva Films / Project 8 Projects	Joy Aquino (director); Rose Van Ginkel, Marco Gallo	
J U L Y	15	Ang Babaeng Nawawala Sa Sarili	Viva Films	Roman Perez Jr. (director); Ayanna Misola, Diego Loyzaga	
J U L Y	22	Tahan	3:16 Media Network / Mentorque Productions	Bobby Bonifacio Jr. (director); Cloe Barreto, JC Santos, Jaclyn Jose	
J U L Y	29	Scorpio Nights 3	Viva Films / Kaulayaw	Lawrence Fajardo (director); Christine Bermas, Mark Anthony Fernandez, Gold Aceron	
A U G U S T	8	Purificacion	Viva Films / Five 2 Seven Entertainment Production	GB Sampedro (director); Cara Gonzales, Josef Elizalde, Ava Mendez, Robb Guinto, Katrina Dovey, Stephanie Raz, Quinn Carrillo	
A U G U S T	12	The Influencer	3:16 Media Network / Mentorque Productions	Louie Ignacio (director); Cloe Barreto, Sean de Guzman	
A U G U S T	19	Lampas Langit	Viva Films / Great Media Productions	Jeffrey Hidalgo (director); Christine Bermas, Baron Geisler, Ricky Davao, Chloe Jenna	
A U G U S T	26	Sitio Diablo	Viva Films	Roman Perez Jr. (director); AJ Raval, Kiko Estrada	
S E P T E M B E R	2	Bula	Viva Films	Bobby Bonifacio Jr. (director); Ayanna Misola, Gab Lagman, Mon Confiado, Robb Guinto	
S E P T E M B E R	9	#DoYouThinkIAmSEXY?	Viva Films / Great Media Productions	Dennis Marasigan (director); Cloe Barreto, Marco Gomez, Chloe Jenna	
S E P T E M B E R	16	The Escort Wife	Viva Films / Mesh Lab	Paul Alexei Basinillo (director); Janelle Tee, Ava Mendez, Raymond Bagatsing	
S E P T E M B E R	23	5 in 1	Viva Films / Five 2 Seven Entertainment Production	GB Sampedro (director); Wilbert Ross, Debbie Garcia, Rose van Ginkel, Ava Mendez, Angela Morena, Jela Cuenca	
S E P T E M B E R	30	Girl Friday	Viva Films	Joel Lamangan (director); Angeli Khang, Jay Manalo, Jela Cuenca	
O C T O B E R	7	Pabuya	Viva Films	Phil Giordano (director); Diego Loyzaga, Franki Russell	
O C T O B E R	14	Relyebo	Viva Films	Crisanto Aquino (director); Sean de Guzman, Christine Bermas, Jela Cuenca, Jeric Raval	
O C T O B E R	21	Tubero	Viva Films / Archangel Media	Topel Lee (director); Vince Rillon, Angela Morena, Jem Milton, Alona Navarro	
O C T O B E R	28	Selina's Gold	Viva Films	McArthur Alejandre (director); Angeli Khang, Gold Aceron, Jay Manalo	
N O V E M B E R	4	Kara Krus	Viva Films / Five 2 Seven Entertainment Production	GB Sampedro (director); Denise Esteban, Adrian Alandy, Felix Roco	
N O V E M B E R	9	Livescream	Viva Films / Powerhouse Media Capital / The IdeaFirst Company	Perci Intalan (director); Elijah Canlas, Phoebe Walker, Katrina Dovey	
N O V E M B E R	11	Showroom	Viva Films / 3:16 Media Network	Carlo Obispo (director); Quinn Carillo, Robb Guinto	
N O V E M B E R	18	Alapaap	Viva Films / Center Stage Productions	Freidric Macapagal Cortez (director); Josef Elizalde, Katrina Dovey, Angela Morena, Andrea Garcia, Chesca Paredes, Ali Asistio, Luke Selby	
N O V E M B E R	25	Us X Her	Viva Films / Digital Dreams	Jules Katanyag (director); AJ Raval, Angeli Khang	
D E C E M B E R	2	Bata Pa si Sabel	Viva Films / Center Stage Productions	Reynold Giba (director); Micaella Raz, Angela Morena, Stephanie Raz, JC Tan, Benz Sangalang, Rash Flores, Chad Solano	
D E C E M B E R	9	Pamasahe	Viva Films	Roman Perez Jr. (director); Azi Acosta, Mark Anthony Fernandez, Felix Roco, Shiena Yu	
D E C E M B E R	16	Laruan	Viva Films / Mesh Lab	Yam Laranas (director); Franki Russell, Kiko Estrada, Jay Manalo, Ava Mendez	
D E C E M B E R	23	An Affair to Forget	Viva Films / 3:16 Media Network	Louie Ignacio (director); Sunshine Cruz, Allen Dizon, Angelica Cervantes, Karl Aquino	
D E C E M B E R	30	Bugso	Viva Films / 3:16 Media Network	Adolfo Alix Jr. (director); Ayanna Misola, Sid Lucero, Hershie de Leon	

=== 2023 ===
Release Date		Title	Production company	Cast and crew	Ref.
J A N U A R Y	6	Panibugho	Viva Films	Iar Arondaing (director); Angela Morena, Stephanie Raz, Micaella Raz, Kiko Estrada	
J A N U A R Y	13	Nightbird	Viva Films	Lawrence Fajardo (director); Christine Bermas, Sid Lucero, Felix Roco	
J A N U A R Y	20	Tag-init	Viva Films / LargaVista Entertainment	Jose Javier Reyes (director); Franki Russell, Yen Durano, Ali Asistio	
J A N U A R Y	27	Bela Luna	Viva Films	McArthur Alejandre (director); Angeli Khang, Mark Anthony Fernandez, Kiko Estrada	
F E B R U A R Y	3	Boso Dos	Viva Films / Pelipula Productions	Jon Red (director); Micaella Raz, Gold Aceron, Vince Rillon	
F E B R U A R Y	10	La Querida	Viva Films / Five 2 Seven Entertainment Production	GB Sampedro (director); Angela Morena, Jay Manalo, Mercedes Cabral, Arron Villaflor	
F E B R U A R Y	17	Lagaslas	Sixteen Degrees Entertainment Production / E-magine Creative Media / BC Entertainment Production	Christopher Novabos (director); Manang Medina, Victor Relosa, Julio Diaz	
F E B R U A R Y	24	Suki	Viva Films / Grand Larain Productions	Albert Langitan (director); Azi Acosta, John Rhey Flores, Alona Navarro, Jiad Arroyo	
M A R C H	3	Lawa	Viva Films	Phil Giordano (director); Cara Gonzales, Sean de Guzman, Jela Cuenca, Josef Elizalde	
M A R C H	10	Salamat Daks	Viva Films	Bobby Bonifacio Jr. (director); Ayanna Misola, Nikko Natividad, Alma Moreno	
M A R C H	17	Domme	Viva Films / Aliud Entertainment	Roman Perez Jr. (director); Ava Mendez, Ali Asistio, Mark Anthony Fernandez	
M A R C H	31	Balik Taya	Viva Films	Roman Perez Jr. (director); Angeli Khang, Jela Cuenca, Azi Acosta, Kiko Estrada	
A P R I L	8	Paupahan	Viva Films / 3:16 Media Network	Louie Ignacio (director); Robb Guinto, Jiad Arroyo, Tiffany Grey	
A P R I L	21	Sapul	Viva Films / ComGuild Productions	Reynold Giba (director); Christine Bermas, Kiko Estrada, Jeric Raval	
A P R I L	28	Sex Games	Viva Films	McArthur Alejandre (director); Azi Acosta, Josef Elizalde, Sheree Bautista	
M A Y	5	AFAM	Viva Films / Archangel Media	Linnet Zurbano (director); Robb Guinto, Jela Cuenca, Nico Locco	
M A Y	12	Fall Guy	Viva Films / 3:16 Media Network / Mentorque Productions	Joel Lamangan (director); Sean de Guzman, Tiffany Grey, Quinn Carillo	
M A Y	19	Sandwich	Viva Films / Center Stage Productions	Jao Elamparo (director); Andrea Garcia, Katrina Dovey, Nico Locco, Luke Selby	
M A Y	26	Kabayo	LDG Productions / 4Blues Productions	Gianfranco Morciano (director); Julia Victoria, Apple Castro, Rico Barrera, Mara Flores	
J U N E	2	Star Dancer	Viva Films	Pam Miras (director); Denise Esteban, Rose van Ginkel, Arron Villaflor	
J U N E	9	Hilom	Viva Films / Five 2 Seven Entertainment Production	GB Sampedro (director); Christine Bermas, Julia Victoria, Arron Villaflor	
J U N E	16	Hosto	Viva Films / Center Stage Productions	Jao Elamparo (director); Angela Morena, Denise Esteban, Vince Rillon, Jay Manalo	
J U N E	23	Tayuan	Viva Films / Two Inches of Loneliness	Topel Lee (director); Angeli Khang, Stephanie Raz, Chester Grecia, Rash Flores	
J U N E	30	Hugot	Viva Films / Lookback Pictures	Daniel Palacio (director); Azi Acosta, Stephanie Raz, Apple Castro	
J U L Y	7	Bugaw	Viva Films / Mesh Lab	Yam Laranas (director); Jay Manalo, Alexa Ocampo, Clifford Pusing, Ataska	
J U L Y	14	Home Service	Viva Films / 3:16 Media Network	Ma-an Aunscion-Dagñalan (director); Hershie de Leon, Angelica Cervantes, Mon Mendoza, Vance Larena	
J U L Y	21	Bisyo!	Viva Films	Daniel Palacio (director); Gold Aceron, Ataska, Angelica Hart, Mark Anthony Fernandez	
J U L Y	28	Litsoneras	Viva Films	Roman Perez Jr. (director); Yen Durano, Jamilla Obispo, Aerol Carmelo, Joko Diaz	
A U G U S T	4	Manyak	Viva Films / Alcazar Films / Blackbox Studios / J-Dreamstar Entertainment	Carlo Alvarez (director); Christine Bermas, Nico Locco, Sheree Bautista, Joko Diaz	
A U G U S T	11	Kamadora	Viva Films	Roman Perez Jr. (director); Tiffany Grey, Victor Relosa, Armina Alegre	
A U G U S T	18	Kahalili	Viva Films	Bobby Bonifacio Jr. (director); Stephanie Raz, Millen Gal, Sid Lucero, Victor Relosa, Mercedes Cabral	
A U G U S T	25	Sugapa	Viva Films	Lawrence Fajardo (director); AJ Raval, Aljur Abrenica	
S E P T E M B E R	1	Call Me Alma	Viva Films	Ricky Lee (director); Azi Acosta, Jaclyn Jose	
S E P T E M B E R	8	Punit Na Langit	Viva Films	Rodante Pajemna Jr. (director); Tiffany Grey, Apple Dy	
S E P T E M B E R	15	Patikim-Tikim	Viva Films / LargaVista Entertainment	Jose Javier Reyes (director); Yen Durano, Apple Dy, Chloe Jenna	
S E P T E M B E R	22	Ligaw na Bulaklak	Viva Films / Great Media Productions	Jeffrey Hidalgo (director); Chloe Jenna, Arron Villaflor	
S E P T E M B E R	29	BJJ: Woman on Top	Viva Films / Two Inches of Loneliness	Linnet Zurbano (director); Angela Morena, Yuki Sakamoto, Jiad Arroyo, Alexa Ocampo	
O C T O B E R	6	Langitngit	Viva Films / White Space Digital Studios	Christopher Novabos (director); Manang Medina, Itan Rosales, Zia Zamora	
O C T O B E R	13	Ahasss	Viva Films / Mavx Productions	Ato Bautista (director); Angela Morena, Janelle Tee, Gold Aceron, Salome Salvi, Jao Mapa	
O C T O B E R	20	Haliparot	Viva Films	Bobby Bonifacio Jr. (director); Maui Taylor, Aiko Garcia, Matthew Francisco, Aeron Carmelo	
O C T O B E R	27	Sila Ay Akin	Viva Films	McArthur Alejandre (director); Angeli Khang, Azi Acosta, Vince Rillon, Victor Relosa	
N O V E M B E R	3	Tuhog	Viva Films / Five 2 Seven Entertainment Production	GB Sampedro (director); Apple Dy, Arron Villaflor, Joko Diaz	
N O V E M B E R	10	Japino	Viva Films / Center Stage Productions	Freidric Macapagal Cortez (director); Denise Esteban, Ali Asistio, Angela Morena, Vince Rillon	
N O V E M B E R	17	Salakab	Viva Films / Pelikula Indiopendent	Roman Perez Jr. (director); Angeli Khang, Benz Sangalang, Sahara Bernales	
N O V E M B E R	24	Sugar Baby	Viva Films	Christian Paolo Lat (director); Azi Acosta, Robb Guinto, Jeffrey Hidalgo, Josef Elizalde	
D E C E M B E R	1	Ganti-Ganti	Viva Films	McArthur Alejandre (director); Angeli Khang, Yen Durano, Sean de Guzman	
D E C E M B E R	8	Haslers	Viva Films / 3:16 Media Network	Jose Abdel Langit (director); Denise Esteban, Quinn Carillo, Hershie de Leon, Angelica Cervantes	
D E C E M B E R	15	Higop	Viva Films / Two Inches of Loneliness	Topel Lee (director); Angelica Hart, Josef Elizalde, Fabio Ide	
D E C E M B E R	22	Foursome	Viva Films / Ray	Gavino Roecha (director); Robb Guinto, Armina Alegre, Nico Locco, Mark Dionisio, Dyessa Garcia	
D E C E M B E R	29	Hibang	Viva Films / Blvck Films / Pelikula Indiopendent	Sigrid Polon (director); Rica Gonzales, Ali Asistio, Sahara Bernales	

=== 2024 ===
Release Date		Title	Production company	Cast and crew	Ref.
J A N U A R Y	5	Bedspacer	Viva Films	Carlo Obispo (director); Christine Bermas, Micaella Raz	
J A N U A R Y	12	Karinyo Brutal	Viva Films / LargaVista Entertainment	Jose Javier Reyes (director); Apple Dy, Armani Hector, Benz Sangalang	
J A N U A R Y	16	Room Service	Vivamax	Bobby Bonifacio Jr. (director); Shiena Yu, Angelo Ilagan, Nathan Cajucom	
J A N U A R Y	19	Palipat-lipat, Papalit-palit	Vivamax / Pelikula Indiopendent	Roman Perez Jr. (director); Yen Durano, Andrea Garcia, John Flores, Massimo Scofield	
J A N U A R Y	26	Pantasya Ni Tami	Vivamax / Two Inches of Loneliness	Topel Lee, Easy Ferrer (director); Azi Acosta, Jiad Arroyo	
J A N U A R Y	31	Dilig	Vivamax	Christian Paolo Lat (director); Dyessa Garcia, Rica Gonzales	
F E B R U A R Y	2	Salawahan	Vivamax / Great Media Productions	Jeffrey Hidalgo (director); Angeli Khang, Albie Casiño	
F E B R U A R Y	9	Katas	Vivamax	Rodante Pajemna Jr. (director); Sahara Bernales, Chester Grecia	
F E B R U A R Y	13	Takas	Vivamax	Roman Perez Jr. (director); Audrey Avila, Cess Garcia, Mon Mendoza	
F E B R U A R Y	16	Salitan	Vivamax / Diamond Productions / Pelikula Indiopendent	Bobby Bonifacio Jr. (director); Angelica Hart, Matt Francisco, Vern Kaye, Nico Locco	
F E B R U A R Y	23	Kabit	Vivamax / Pelikulaw	Lawrence Fajardo (director); Angela Morena, Dyessa Garcia, Victor Relosa, Josef Elizalde	
F E B R U A R Y	27	Salisihan	Vivamax	Iar Arondaig (director); Zsara Laxamana, Amabella de Leon, Chester Grecia, Ralph Christian Engle	
M A R C H	1	Eks	Vivamax / Blvck Vilms / Pelikula Indiopendent	Roman Perez Jr. (director); Yen Durano, Albie Casiño, Felix Roco	
M A R C H	8	Kapalit	Vivamax	Carlo Alvarez (director); Cess Garcia, Rica Gonzales, Matt Francisco, Chad Alviar	
M A R C H	12	Kalikot	Vivamax	Temi Cruz Abad (director); Sheila Snow, Van Allen Ong, Arah Alonzo	
M A R C H	15	Mapanukso	Vivamax / LDG Productions	Jose Abdel Langit (director); Tiffany Grey, Ataska, Sean de Guzman, Marco Gomez	
M A R C H	22	Rita	Vivamax	Jerry Lopez Sineneng (director); Christine Bermas, Victor Relosa, Gold Aceron	
M A R C H	26	Kasalo	Vivamax	HF Yambao (director); Vern Kaye, Albie Casiño	
M A R C H	30	TL	Vivamax	Jordan Castillo (director); Jenn Rosa, Nico Locco, Armani Hector	
A P R I L	2	Cheaters	Vivamax	Dustin Celestino (director); Angeline Aril, Aerol Carmelo, Kara Fernandez, Jhon Mark Marcia	
A P R I L	5	Stag	Vivamax / Pelipula Productions	Jon Red (director); Denise Esteban, Arah Alonzo, Gold Aceron, Aerol Carmelo	
A P R I L	12	Sweet Release	Vivamax	Pancho Maniquis (director); Ataska, Dyessa Garcia, Mhack Morales	
A P R I L	16	Wanted: Girlfriend	Vivamax	Rember Gelera (director); Shiena Yu, Yuki Sakamoto, Reina Castillo	
A P R I L	19	Dayo	Vivamax	Sid Pascua (director); Rica Gonzales, Audrey Avila, Marco Gomez, Calvin Reyes	
A P R I L	26	Red Flag	Vivamax	Lakambini Morales (director); Micaella Raz, Mon Mendoza, Joana David, Mhack Morales	
A P R I L	30	Late Bloomer	Vivamax	Rodante Pajemna Jr. (director); Robb Guinto, Erika Balagtas, Ardy Raymundo, Mikhael Padua	
M A Y	3	Lady Guard	Vivamax	Bobby Bonifacio Jr. (director); Angela Morena, Irish Tan	
M A Y	10	Dirty Ice Cream	Vivamax	Mervyn Brondial (director); Christy Imperial, Candy Veloso, Yda Manzano, Jem Milton	
M A Y	17	Balinsasayaw	Vivamax / JPHlix Films / Flash Fast Production	Rodante Pajemna Jr. (director); Aiko Garcia, Apple Dy, Benz Sangalang	
M A Y	24	Kulong	Vivamax	Sigrid Polon (director); Jenn Rosa, Aica Veloso, Cariz Manzano, JD Aguas	
M A Y	28	Serbidoras	Vivamax	Ray Gibraltar (director); Chloe Jenna, Denise Esteban, Aila Cruz	
M A Y	31	Himas	Vivamax	Christian Paolo Lat (director); Sahara Bernales, Zsara Laxamana, Felix Roco, MJ Abellera	
J U N E	4	Mahal Ko Ang Mahal Mo	Vivamax	Aya Topacio (director); Angelica Hart, Angeline Aril, Van Allen Ong, Mia Cruz	
J U N E	7	Linya	Vivamax	Carlo Alvarez (director); Sheila Snow, Cess Garcia, Anthony Davao, Chester Grecia, VJ Vera	
J U N E	14	Sisid Marino	Vivamax / LDG Productions	Joel Lamangan (director); Julia Victoria, Ataska, Jhon Mark Marcia	
J U N E	18	Cita	Vivamax / Mckenzie Brad Entertainment Production	Mary Jane Balagtas (director); Erika Balagtas, Francis Mata, Arjay Bautista	
J U N E	21	Nurse Abi	Vivamax	Dustin Celestino (director); Alessandra Cruz, Vince Rillon	
J U N E	28	Huwad	Vivamax / ComGuild Productions / Flaming River Film Production	Reynold Giba (director); Azi Acosta, Chloe Jenna, Aeron Carmelo	
J U L Y	2	Top 1	Vivamax	Temi Abad (director); Christy Imperial, Mariane Saint, Armani Hector	
J U L Y	5	Maliko	Vivamax / Flash Fast Production	JR Frias (director); Sahara Bernales, Eunice Santos, Richard Solano	
J U L Y	12	Hiraya	Vivamax / 3:16 Media Network	Sid Pascua (director); Rica Gonzales, Itan Rosales, Denise Esteban	
J U L Y	16	Kaulayaw	Vivamax	Iar Arondaing (director); Robb Guinto, Micaella Raz, Matt Francisco	
J U L Y	19	Maharot	Vivamax / Flash Fast Production	Rodante Pajemna Jr. (director); Aiko Garcia, Victor Relosa, Athena Red	
J U L Y	26	Kaskasero	Vivamax / 3:16 Media Network	Ludwig Peralta (director); Angela Morena, Christine Bermas, Itan Rosales	
J U L Y	30	Init	Vivamax	Piem Acero (director); Dyessa Garcia, Candy Veloso, Rash Flores	
A U G U S T	2	Daddysitter	Vivamax	Christian Paolo Lat (director); Apple Dy, Emil Sandoval, Armani Hector, Mia Cruz	
A U G U S T	7	Unang Tikim	Vivamax / Pelikula Indiopendent	Roman Perez Jr. (director); Angeli Khang, Robb Guinto	
A U G U S T	9	Package Deal	Vivamax	Carby Salvador (director); Angelica Hart, Mariane Saint, Mark Anthony Fernandez	
A U G U S T	13	Backrider	Vivamax	Bobby Bonifacio Jr. (director); Jenn Rosa, Aeron Carmelo, Chad Alviar	
A U G U S T	16	Ang Pintor at ang Paraluman	Vivamax	Marc Misa (director); Ali Asistio, Athena Red, Skye Gonzaga	
A U G U S T	23	Ang Kapitbahay	Vivamax	Rodante Pajemna Jr. (director); Christine Bermas, Clifford Pusing, Chester Grecia	
A U G U S T	27	Private Tutor	Vivamax / Blink Creative Studio / Nice One Productions	Ryan Evangelista (director); Zsara Laxamana, Christy Imperial	
A U G U S T	30	Butas	Vivamax	Dado Lumibao (director); Angela Morena, Angelica Hart, Albie Casiño	
S E P T E M B E R	3	F-Buddies	Vivamax / 3:16 Media Network	Sid Pascua (director); Denise Esteban, Candy Veloso, Calvin Reyes	
S E P T E M B E R	6	Throuple	Vivamax / Pelikula Indiopendent	Aya Topacio (director); Audrey Avila, Sahara Bernales, Aerol Carmelo	
S E P T E M B E R	13	Uhaw	Vivamax / White Space Digital Studios	Bobby Bonifacio Jr. (director); Angeli Khang, Ataska, Itan Rosales	
S E P T E M B E R	17	Paluwagan	Vivamax / Pelikula Indiopendent	Roman Perez Jr. (director); Micaella Raz, Victor Relosa, Shiena Yu, Chad Solano	
S E P T E M B E R	20	Pilya	Vivamax / PCB Film Production	Dustin Celestino (director); Cess Garcia, Dyessa Garcia, Dani Yoshida, Chester Grecia	
S E P T E M B E R	27	Kiskisan	Vivamax / LDG Productions	Bobby Bonifacio Jr. (director); Robb Guinto, Apple Dy, Skye Gonzaga, Juan Calma	
O C T O B E R	1	Salsa Ni L	Vivamax	Rodante Pajemna Jr. (director); Christine Bermas, Sean de Guzman	
O C T O B E R	4	Tahong	Vivamax / Diamond Productions	Christopher Novabos (director); Candy Veloso, Salome Salvi, Jhon Mark Marcia, Emil Sandoval	
O C T O B E R	11	Tatsulok: Tatlo Magkasalo	Vivamax / LDG Productions	Johnny Nadela (director); Mariane Saint, Skye Gonzaga, Jhon Mark Marcia	
O C T O B E R	15	Undergrads	Vivamax / The Big Shot Productions	Sigrid Polon (director); Rica Gonzales, Athena Red, Van Allen Ong, Emil Sandoval	
O C T O B E R	18	Halinghing	VMX / 3 Clubs Entertainment	Jaque Carlos (director); Aiko Garcia, Jenn Rosa, Josef Elizalde	
O C T O B E R	25	Krista	VMX / 3:16 Media Network	Sid Pascua (director); Cess Garcia, Karl Aquino, Zsara Laxamana	
O C T O B E R	29	Donselya	VMX / White Space Digital Studios	Christopher Novabos (director); Dyessa Garcia, Vern Kaye, Chloe Jenna	
N O V E M B E R	1	Baligtaran	VMX / 3:16 Media Network	Aya Topacio (director); Skye Gonzaga, Apple Dy, Calvin Reyes	
N O V E M B E R	8	Ungol	VMX / White Space Digital Studios	Bobby Bonifacio Jr. (director); Audrey Avila, Stephanie Raz, Chad Solano, Ghion Espinosa	
N O V E M B E R	12	Kabitan	VMX / The Big Shot Productions	Sigrid Polon (director); Alessandra Cruz, Athena Red, Chester Grecia, Juan Calma	
N O V E M B E R	15	Maryang Palad	VMX / Diamond Productions	Rodante Pajemna Jr. (director); Sahara Bernales, Vince Rillon	
N O V E M B E R	22	Pukpok	VMX / Diamond Productions	Christopher Novabos (director); Allison Smith, Arah Alonzo, Rash Flores	
N O V E M B E R	26	Boss Ma'am	VMX / FBN Media	Iar Arondaing (director); Jenn Rosa, Vern Kaye, Aeron Carmelo	
D E C E M B E R	3	Silip	VMX / 3:16 Media Network	Bobby Bonifacio Jr. (director); Rica Gonzales, Lea Bernabe, Karl Aquino	
D E C E M B E R	4	Celestina: Burlesk Dancer	VMX	McArthur Alejandre (director); Yen Durano, Christine Bermas, Sid Lucero, Arron Villaflor	
D E C E M B E R	6	Pin/Ya	VMX / Pelikula Indiopendent	Omar Deroca (director); Angelica Hart, Candy Veloso, Julian Richard	
D E C E M B E R	13	Forbidden Desire	VMX / Five 2 Seven Entertainment Production	GB Sampedro (director); Aiko Garcia, Vern Kaye, Josef Elizalde	
D E C E M B E R	17	Lamas	VMX / Diamond Productions	Christian Paolo Lat (director); Ataska, Christy Imperial, Mark Anthony Fernandez	
D E C E M B E R	20	Secret Sessions	VMX / Hugging Otters	Joel Ferrer (director); Athena Red, Nico Locco, Alona Navarro	
D E C E M B E R	27	Boy Kaldag	VMX / Blvck Films / Pelikula Indiopendent	Roman Perez Jr. (director); Benz Sangalang, Dyessa Garcia	
D E C E M B E R	31	Mama's Boy	VMX	Paul Michael Acero (director); Sahara Bernales, Stephanie Raz, Victor Relosa, Josh Ivan Morales	

=== 2025 ===
Release Date		Title	Production company	Cast and crew	Ref.
J A N U A R Y	3	Teacher's Pet	VMX / Diamond Productions	Sigrid Polon (director); Apple Dy, Micaella Raz, Gold Aceron	
J A N U A R Y	10	Las Ilusyunadas	VMX / Pelikula Indiopendent	Roman Perez Jr. (director); Jenn Rosa, Angeline Aril, JD Aguas, JC Tan	
J A N U A R Y	14	Table For 3	VMX / The IdeaFirst Company	Ivan Andrew Payawal (director); Topper Fabregas, Arkin del Rosario, Jesse Guinto	
J A N U A R Y	17	Halimuyak	VMX / White Space Digital Studios	Bobby Bonifacio Jr. (director); Christy Imperial, Skye Gonzaga, Chester Grecia, Carlo Lacana	
J A N U A R Y	24	Hiram Na Sandali	VMX / Five 2 Seven Entertainment Production	GB Sampedro (director); Dyessa Garcia, Denise Esteban, Vince Rillon, Aerol Carmelo	
J A N U A R Y	31	Sponsor	VMX	Albert Langitan (director); Micaella Raz, Angela Morena, Mon Confiado	
F E B R U A R Y	7	Belyas	VMX / Five 2 Seven Entertainment Production	GB Sampedro (director); Audrey Avila, Dani Yoshida, Denise Esteban, Matt Francisco	
F E B R U A R Y	11	Bigayan	VMX / The IdeaFirst Company	Ivan Andrew Payawal (director); Mike Liwag, Jesse Guinto	
F E B R U A R Y	14	Online Selling	VMX / 3 Clubs Entertainment	Jaque Carlos (director); Arah Alonzo, Aria Bench, Andrew Gan	
F E B R U A R Y	21	Tokyo Nights	VMX	Joey Cruz Manalang (director); Alessandra Cruz, Benz Sangalang, Mark Niño, Arneth Watanabe	
F E B R U A R Y	28	Walker	VMX	Lawrence Fajardo (director); Robb Guinto, Stephanie Raz, Vince Rillon, Mark Dionisio	
M A R C H	7	Kolektor	VMX / Alcazar Films / Blackbox Studios / NL Productions	Carlo Alvarez (director); Nico Locco, Aiko Garcia, Candy Veloso, Salome Salvi	
M A R C H	11	Malagkit	VMX / White Space Digital Studios	Bobby Bonifacio Jr. (director); Ashley Lopez, Lea Bernabe, VJ Vera, Ace Toledo	
M A R C H	14	Elevator Lady	VMX / Red Apple Manila	Rodante Pajemna Jr. (director); Aliya Raymundo, Albie Casiño, Vern Kaye, Zsa Zsa Zobel	
M A R C H	21	Delusyon	VMX	Carby Salvador (director); Apple Dy, Ardy Raymundo, Gboy Pablo	
A P R I L	1	Habal	VMX / White Space Digital Studios	Bobby Bonifacio Jr. (director); Athena Red, Karen Lopez, JD Aguas, Jhon Mark Marcia	
A P R I L	4	Puri For Rent	VMX / LDG Productions	Christopher Novabos (director); Aiko Garcia, Roxanne de Vera, Van Allen Ong, Jhon Mark Marcia	
A P R I L	11	Bangkera	VMX / PCB Film Production	Temi Abad (director); Micaella Raz, John Marco Mora, Zsa Zsa Zobel, Chester Grecia	
A P R I L	15	Violet	VMX / Five 2 Seven Entertainment Production	Rainerio Yamson II (director); Aliya Raymundo, Christy Imperial, Dani Yoshida, Ralph Christian Engle	
A P R I L	20	Tampipi	VMX / 3 Clubs Entertainment	Bobby Bonifacio Jr. (director); Sahara Bernales, Victor Relosa, Stephanie Raz	
A P R I L	25	Sabik	VMX / Infinity Talent Management	Dado Lumibao (director); Angela Morena, Athena Red, Benz Sangalang	
M A Y	2	Rapsa	VMX / Infinity Talent Management	Topel Lee (director); Micaella Raz, JD Aguas, Vern Kaye	
M A Y	9	Ligaw	VMX / Marvex Studios Inc.	Omar Deroca (director); Robb Guinto, Ali Asistio, JC Tan, Rash Flores	
M A Y	13	The Jowa Collector	VMX / Infinity Talent Management	Dado Lumibao (director); Zsara Laxamana, Anne Marie Gonzales, Itan Rosales	
M A Y	16	Ang Pamumukadkad ni Mirasol	VMX	Ambo Jacinto (director); Queenie de Mesa, Ghion Espinosa, Ralph Christian Engle	
M A Y	23	Maninilip	VMX	Rodante Pajemna Jr. (director); Ashley Lopez, Rinoa Halili, Aerol Carmelo	
M A Y	30	Hiram	VMX / 3:16 Media Network / Vipe Studios	Ludwig Peralta (director); Rica Gonzales, Cess Garcia, Itan Rosales	
J U N E	6	Pihit	VMX / Pelikula Indiopendent / JPHlix Films	Sigrid Polon (director); Denise Esteban, Christy Imperial, Angeline Aril, Victor Relosa	
J U N E	13	Kalakal	VMX / Pelikula Indiopendent	Roman Perez Jr. (director); Aliya Raymundo, Gold Aceron	
J U N E	20	Sorority	VMX	Sigrid Polon (director); Azi Acosta, Apple Dy	
J U N E	24	Bayo	VMX / Pelikula Indiopendent	Roman Perez Jr. (director); Ashley Lopez, Anne Marie Gonzales, Nathan Cajucom	
J U N E	27	Sex on Phone	VMX / Infinity Talent Management	Bobby Bonifacio Jr. (director); Angela Morena, Zsara Laxamana, Matt Francisco	
J U L Y	4	Obsesyon	VMX / Great Media Productions	Jeffrey Hidalgo (director); Christy Imperial, Yda Manzano, Itan Rosales	
J U L Y	11	Sipsipan	VMX	Rodante Pajemna Jr. (director); Micaella Raz, Lea Bernabe, Astrid Lee, JC Tan	
J U L Y	18	Hipak	VMX	Philip King (director); Athena Red, Sean de Guzman, Anne Marie Gonzales, Stephanie Raz, Ivan Ponce	
J U L Y	22	Kandungan	VMX	Joel Ferrer (director); Rica Gonzales, Arah Alonzo, Nico Locco	
J U L Y	25	Maalikaya	VMX / Pelikula Indiopendent	Roman Perez Jr. (director); Jenn Rosa, Aliya Raymundo	
J U L Y	29	Tusok Tusok	VMX / Pelikula Indiopendent	Ronald Batallones (director); Sahara Bernales, Queenie de Mesa, JC Tan	
A U G U S T	1	Ligaya	VMX / Five 2 Seven Entertainment Production	GB Sampedro (director); Shiena Yu, Vince Rillon, Cess Garcia	
A U G U S T	8	L: Langoy	VMX / Pelipula Productions	Jon Red (director); Rica Gonzales, Victor Relosa	
A U G U S T	12	Trianggulo	VMX	Christopher Novabos (director); Vern Kaye, Skye Gonzaga, Marco Mora	
A U G U S T	15	Victoria's Silver	VMX	McArthur Alejandre (director); Christine Bermas, Gold Aceron, Victor Relosa	
A U G U S T	22	69	VMX / LDG Productions	Rodante Pajemna Jr. (director); Aliya Raymundo, Queenie de Mesa, Ashley Lopez, Juan Calma, Mhack Morales, Paula Santos	
A U G U S T	29	Sa Gabing Mainit	VMX / PCB Film Production	Topel Lee (director); Angeline Aril, Nico Locco	
S E P T E M B E R	2	Bulong ng Laman	VMX / Pelikula Indiopendent	Tootoots Leyesa (director); Aiko Garcia, Divine Villareal	
S E P T E M B E R	5	L: Lakad	VMX / Pelipula Productions	Mervyn Brondial (director); Gold Aceron, Vern Kaye	
S E P T E M B E R	12	Barurot	VMX / Potzu Bros Productions	Rodante Pajemna Jr. (director); Karen Lopez, JC Tan, Reina Castillo, Paula Santos, Mark Dionisio	
S E P T E M B E R	19	Foreign Exchange	VMX / Quicksilver Films	Dominic Cruz (director); Sean de Guzman, Sahara Bernales, Athena Red, Audrey Avila	
S E P T E M B E R	26	Mayumi	VMX / The Big Shot Productions	Sigrid Polon (director); Aliya Raymundo, Marco Mora	
S E P T E M B E R	30	Kirot	VMX / Infinity Talent Management	Bobby Bonifacio Jr. (director); Jenn Rosa, Ashley Lopez, JC Tan, Rinoa Halili, Dio de Jesus	
O C T O B E R	3	Basang Basa	VMX / Center Stage Productions	Freidric Macapagal Cortez (director); Christy Imperial, Sean de Guzman, Je Ann Fortich	
O C T O B E R	10	L: Lipad	VMX / Pelipula Productions	Dennis Empalmado (director); Ashley Lopez, Aerol Carmelo	
O C T O B E R	17	Paalam, Salamat	VMX / Infinity Talent Management	Bobby Bonifacio Jr. (director); Rinoa Halili, Ghion Espinosa, Ruby Ruiz, Arnold Reyes	
O C T O B E R	24	Sembreak	VMX / 3:16 Media Network	Sid Pascua (director); Christine Bermas, Jenn Rosa, Rica Gonzales, Itan Rosales, Mon Mendoza	
O C T O B E R	28	Unli Pop	VMX / Infinity Talent Management	Topel Lee (director); Micaella Raz, Julianne Richards, Marco Gomez	
O C T O B E R	31	Mamasan	VMX / PCB Film Production	Topel Lee (director); Aliya Raymundo, Yda Manzano, Van Allen Ong	
N O V E M B E R	7	Nympho	VMX / Center Stage Productions	Freidric Macapagal Cortez (director); Jenn Rosa, Vince Rillon	
N O V E M B E R	14	Madulas	VMX / PCB Film Production	Rodante Pajemna Jr. (director); Astrid Lee, Marco Mora, Cheena Dizon, Rhea Montemayor, Liana Rosales	
N O V E M B E R	21	Akin ang Gabi	VMX / Real to Reel Studios	Joel Ferrer (director); Queenie de Mesa, Victor Relosa	
N O V E M B E R	25	Next Room Affair	VMX / LDG Productions	Christopher Novabos (director); Karen Lopez, Mhack Morales	
N O V E M B E R	28	Balahibong Pusa	VMX / Pelikula Indiopendent	Roman Perez Jr. (director); Margaret Diaz, Itan Rosales, Mark Anthony Fernandez, Christine Bermas, Yda Manzano	
D E C E M B E R	5	Kapag Tumayo ang Testigo	VMX	JR Reyes (director); Nico Locco, Divine Villareal	
D E C E M B E R	12	Maria Azama: Best P*rnstar	Overstimulated Studios	Alpha Habon (director); Albie Casiño, Dani Yoshida	
D E C E M B E R	19	Ekis	VMX	Christian Paolo Lat (director); Aliya Raymundo, Angela Morena, Cheena Dizon	
D E C E M B E R	23	Pagdaong	Roughroad Productions	Pongs Leonardo (director); Angela Morena, Ashley Lopez, Astrid Lee	
D E C E M B E R	26	Aliwan Inn	VMX / Pelikula Indiopendent	Roman Perez Jr. (director); Margaret Diaz, Marco Mora	
D E C E M B E R	30	Happy Ending	VMX / PCB Film Production	Topel Lee (director); Ashley Lopez, Ghion Espinosa	

=== 2026 ===
Release Date		Title	Production company	Cast and crew	Ref.
J A N U A R Y	2	Salikmata	Cine Canawili Productions	BC Amparado (director); Aliya Raymundo, Aerol Carmelo, Rinoa Halili	
J A N U A R Y	9	Breast Friends Forever	VMX	Easy Ferrer (director); Astrid Lee, Audrey Avila, Janno Gibbs	
J A N U A R Y	16	Ang Lihim ni Maria Makinang	Spikehead Media	Gian Arre (director); Aiko Garcia, Gold Aceron	
J A N U A R Y	20	Sulutan	VMX / Potzu Bros Productions	Rodante Pajemna Jr. (director); Astrid Lee, Karen Lopez	
J A N U A R Y	23	Angkinin Mo Ako	VMX / PCB Film Production	Topel Lee (director); Cess Garcia, Dara Lima, Juan Calma	
J A N U A R Y	30	Sirena	VMX / Infinity Talent Management	Bobby Bonifacio Jr. (director); Micaella Raz, Rica Gonzales, Van Allen Ong	
F E B R U A R Y	6	Sagaran	VMX / 3:16 Media Network	Sid Pascua (director); Ashley Lopez, Marco Gomez	
F E B R U A R Y	13	Pansamantala	VMX / LDG Productions	King Abalos (director); Athena Red, Karen Lopez, Jhon Mark Marcia, Paula Santos, Rhian Rivera	
F E B R U A R Y	17	Tenement	VMX	Philip King (director); Arron Villaflor, Marco Gallo, Franki Russell	
F E B R U A R Y	20	Sex Trip	VMX	Lawrence Fajardo (director); Cheena Dizon, Audrey Avila, Angeline Aril, Victor Relosa, Van Allen Ong	
F E B R U A R Y	27	Warat	VMX / 3:16 Media Network	Christian Paolo Lat (director); Margaret Diaz, Itan Rosales	
M A R C H	6	Sundutan	VMX / Potzu Bros Productions	Rodante Pajemna Jr. (director); Allison Ross, Jade Esguerra, Mark Dionisio	
M A R C H	13	Abot Langit	VMX / Infinity Talent Management	Topel Lee (director); Aliya Raymundo, JC Tan, Jio Yoshida	
M A R C H	17	Vigilante	VMX	Christian Paolo Lat (director); Diego Loyzaga, Robb Guinto, Vince Rillon	
M A R C H	20	Tuklas	VMX / Mizfitz	Dwight Buot (director); Skye Gonzaga, Chino Villaluna	
M A R C H	27	Maid's Obsession	VMX	Ronald Batallones (director); Queenie de Mesa, Cheena Dizon	
M A R C H	31	Scorpio Nights 4	VMX / Mabolo Drive Pictures	Bobby Bonifacio Jr. (director); Apphle Celso, Marco Mora, Albie Casiño, Sahara Bernales	
A P R I L	4	Stepdaddy	VMX / LDG Productions	Christopher Novabos (director); Astrid Lee, Christy Imperial, Jhon Mark Marcia, Jamilla Obispo	
A P R I L	10	Sawsawan	VMX	Rodante Pajemna Jr. (director); Karen Lopez, Allen Legazpi, Rhian Rivera	
A P R I L	17	Tayuan 2	VMX / PCB Film Production	Topel Lee (director); Ashley Lopez, Marco Mora, Chester Grecia	
A P R I L	24	Kesong Puti	VMX / Potzu Bros Productions	Rodante Pajemna Jr. (director); Apphle Celso, Rinoa Halili, Van Allen Ong, Mark Dionisio	
A P R I L	28	Barurot 2	VMX / Pelikula Indiopendent	Quiel Dela Cruz (director); Margaret Diaz, Aerol Carmelo, JC Tan	
M A Y	1	Check-in	VMX / PCB Film Production	Christopher Novabos (director); Aliya Raymundo, Anya Austria, Victor Relosa	
M A Y	5	Pasakalye	VMX	Roman Perez Jr. (director); Marco Gumabao, Andrew Muhlach, Denise Esteban, Angelica Hart	
M A Y	8	Scissors	VMX / The Good Bois Film Production	Christopher Novabos (director); Allison Ross, Rhian Rivera, Ghion Espinosa	
M A Y	15	Hayok	VMX / PCB Film Production	Topel Lee (director); Apphle Celso, Nico Locco, Stephanie Raz	
M A Y	22	Monay	VMX / The Good Bois Film Production	Christopher Novabos (director); Sahara Bernales, Rash Flores, Kim Yashii	
M A Y	29	Palitan 2	VMX / Real to Reel Studios	Rodante Pajemna Jr. (director); Angela Morena, Margaret Diaz, Victor Relosa, Juan Calma	
J U N E	5	Scandal Queen	VMX / PCB Film Production	Topel Lee (director); Karen Lopez, Nico Locco, Rhian Rivera	
J U N E	9	Sugar Mommy	VMX / The Good Bois Film Production	Christopher Novabos (director); Jamilla Obispo, Ashley Lopez, Aerol Carmelo, Rash Flores	
J U N E	12	Kikirot-kirot	VMX / Potzu Bros Productions	Rodante Pajemna Jr. (director); Skye Gonzaga, Rinoa Halili, Mark Dionisio	
J U N E	19	Latina	VMX / Real to Reel Studios	King Abalos (director); Shalanie de Vera, Athena Red, Mhack Morales, Chester Grecia	
J U N E	26	The Cheating Wife	VMX / Real to Reel Studios	Mikko Baldoza (director); Allison Ross, Cess Garcia, Vince Rillon	
J U N E	30	Hibla 2	VMX / PCB Film Production	Topel Lee (director); Aliya Raymundo, Margaret Diaz, Albie Casiño, Ghion Espinosa	
J U L Y	3	Helena	VMX / Marvex Studios Inc.	Omar Deroca (director); Jenn Rosa, Van Allen Ong	
J U L Y	10	Siping	VMX / The Good Bois Film Production	Christopher Novabos (director); Shannon Sizon, Cheena Dizon, Chad Solano	
J U L Y	17	Lunok	VMX / Five 2 Seven Entertainment Production	Rainerio Yamson II (director); Astrid Lee, Allison Ross	
J U L Y	24	Booking	VMX / Potzu Bros Productions	Pongs Leonardo (director); Margaret Diaz, Denise Esteban, Nico Locco	
J U L Y	31	Creampie	VMX / Potzu Bros Productions	Rodante Pajemna Jr. (director); Angel Castro, Christy Imperial, Vince Rillon, Mark Dionisio	
A U G U S T	7	Ang Modista	VMX / PCB Film Production	Ronald Batallones (director); Micaella Raz, Mon Confiado, Kim Yashii	
A U G U S T	14	Haplos ni Milagros	VMX / LDG Productions	Christopher Novabos (director); Vern Kaye, Jhon Mark Marcia, Anya Austria	
A U G U S T	21	Apoy sa Ibabaw, Apoy sa Ilalim	VMX / Marvex Studios Inc.	Omar Deroca (director); Rhian Rivera, Itan Rosales	
A U G U S T	28	Sex Drive	VMX / Styled by Ashley C.	Bobby Bonifacio Jr. (director); Angel Castro, Apphle Celso, Benz Sangalang, Juan Calma	
S E P T E M B E R	4	Babae sa Butas	Sixth Sense Entertainment Production / Sine Asia International	Rhance Añonuevo-Cariño (director); Van Allen Ong, Vern Kaye, Skye Gonzaga, Arah Alonzo, Karen Lopez	
S E P T E M B E R	11	Spit or Swallow	VMX / The Big Shot Productions / 4Blues Productions	Sigrid Polon (director); Rinoa Halili, Kim Yashii, Ghion Espinosa	
S E P T E M B E R	18	Desperada	LDG Productions	Louie Ignacio (director); Robb Guinto, Yasser Marta, Mhack Morales	
S E P T E M B E R	25	Isla	VMX / Potzu Bros Productions	Rodante Pajemna Jr. (director); Margaret Diaz, Mark Anthony Fernandez, Shannon Sizon, Marco Mora, Mark Dionisio	
O C T O B E R	9	My Hentai Girlfriend	VMX / LDG Productions	Bobby Bonifacio Jr. (director); Ashley Lopez, Gold Aceron, Akira Takamura	
O C T O B E R	16	Dutdot	VMX / PCB Film Production	Christopher Novabos (director); Aliya Raymundo, Krista Miller, Chester Grecia	
O C T O B E R	23	Sukdulan	VMX / The Big Shot Productions / 4Blues Productions	Lawrence Fajardo (director); Shalanie de Vera, Benz Sangalang, Chad Solano	
O C T O B E R	30	Threesome	VMX / Potzu Bros Productions	Rodante Pajemna Jr. (director); Angel Castro, Rhian Rivera, Shiena Yu, Vince Rillon	
N O V E M B E R	6	MILF	VMX	Rodante Pajemna Jr. (director); Maui Taylor, Katya Santos, Sheree Bautista, Gwen Garci, Ashley Lopez, Itan Rosales	
N O V E M B E R	13	Labas Pasok	VMX / Infinity Talent Management	Bobby Bonifacio Jr. (director); Jenn Rosa, Ghion Espinosa, Mark Dionisio, Lea Bernabe	
N O V E M B E R	20	Laplap	VMX / Infinity Talent Management	Dado Lumibao (director); Apphle Celso, Rinoa Halili, Aerol Carmelo, Marco Mora	
N O V E M B E R	27	Gamitan 2	VMX / PCB Film Production	Topel Lee (director); Margaret Diaz, Gold Aceron, Victor Relosa	
D E C E M B E R	4	Tigang	VMX / CG Entertainment Production	Cara Gonzales (director); Aliya Raymundo, Sean de Guzman, Shannon Sizon, Ghion Espinosa	
D E C E M B E R	11	Dirty Confexxions	VMX / Pelikula Indiopendent	Roman Perez Jr. (director); Angel Castro, Astrid Lee, Cheena Dizon, Nico Locco	
D E C E M B E R	18	Warak	VMX	King Abalos (director); Shalanie de Vera, Paolo Gumabao, Victor Relosa	
D E C E M B E R	25	Haplos sa Hangin	Southern Lantern Studios	Mikko Baldoza (director); Denise Esteban, Martin del Rosario, Angelica Cervantes	

– a CineSilip Film Festival entry

– a Sinag Maynila Independent Film Festival entry

== Original series ==
=== 2022 ===
Title	Premiere	Number of episodes	Cast and crew	Ref
Lulu	January 23	8	Sigrid Andrea Bernardo (director); Rhen Escaño, Rita Martinez	
L	February 27	3	Larawan: Topel Lee (director); Vince Rillon, Ayanna Misola, Stephanie Raz; Liko: EJ Salcedo (director); Vince Rillon, Cloe Barreto, Stephanie Raz; Lipat: Roman Perez Jr. (director); Vince Rillon, Cara Gonzales, Stephanie Raz	
Iskandalo	April 10	10	Roman Perez Jr. (director); Cindy Miranda, AJ Raval, Ayanna Misola	
High (School) on Sex	June 2	8	GB Sampedro (director); Wilbert Ross, Denise Esteban, Angela Morena, Katrina Dovey, Migs Almendras	
Wag Mong Agawin Ang Akin	July 31	8	McArthur Alejandre (director); Angeli Khang, Jamilla Obispo, Felix Roco	
An/Na	September 22	4	Jose Javier Reyes (director); Janelle Tee, Robb Guinto, Migs Almendras, Micaella Raz, Azi Acosta, Guji Lorenzana, Fabio Ide, Greg Hawkins	
Secrets Of A Nympho	October 23	8	Shugo Praico (director); Rhen Escaño, Ayanna Misola, Arron Villaflor, Jiad Arroyo, Gold Aceron, Josef Elizalde, Andrea Garcia, Milana Ikimoto, Julia Victoria	
Lovely Ladies Dormitory	December 18	6	Mervyn Brondial (director); Andrea Garcia, Tiffany Gray, Julia Victoria, Yen Durano, Hershie De Leon	

=== 2023 ===
Title	Premiere	Number of episodes	Cast and crew	Ref
Erotica Manila	January 29	4	Lawrence Fajardo (director); Cinema Parausan: Azi Acosta, Alex Medina; Girl 11: Cara Gonzales, Josef Elizalde, Chesca Paredes; MILF and the OJT: Mercedes Cabral, Vince Rillon; Death by Orgasm: Alona Navarro, Felix Roco, Benz Sangalang	
Stalkers	February 26	4	Easy Ferrer (director); Rose Van Ginkel, Wilbert Ross, Mark Anthony Fernandez, Yayo Aguila	
Sssshhh!	March 26	4	Roman Perez Jr. (director); Hall Pass: Salome Salvi, Vince Rillon, Alexa Ocampo, Rash Flores, Amanda Avecilla, Aica Veloso; Benching: Salome Salvi, Micaella Raz, Quinn Carrillo, Aerol Carmelo; Party n' Play: Salome Salvi, Arron Villaflor, Chesca Paredes, Jeffrey Hidalgo, Ada Hermosa; Guilt Trip: Salome Salvi, Yen Durano, Victor Relosa, Julia Victoria	
PantaXa: Laiya	April 23	6	Paul Alexei Basinillo (director); Wilbert Ross, Rose Van Ginkel (host); Audrey Avila, Armina Alegre, Aiko Garcia, Aila Cruz, Apple Dy, Angelica Hart, Cess Garcia, Aria Bench	
Sex Hub	June 4	4	Bobby Bonifacio Jr. (director); Micaella Raz, Salome Salvi, Joko Diaz, Karl Aquino, Yda Manzano, Shiena Yu, Alvaro Oyteza, Roi Alonte, Jason Evans	
High (School) on Sex 2	July 2	6	GB Sampedro (director); Angelica Hart, Aiko Garcia, Apple Dy, Audrey Avila, Cess Garcia, Jamilla Obispo, Clifford Pusing, Van Allen Ong	
Secret Campus	August 27	4	Jose Javier Reyes (director); Clea: Angelica Hart, Aerol Carmelo; Andi: Ataska, Arron Villaflor; Eunice: Angela Morena, Victor Rellosa, Armina Alegre; Myra: Azi Acosta, Clifford Pusing	
Halo-Halo X	October 8	4	Roman Perez Jr. (director); Extra Rider: Denise Esteban, Audrey Avila, Yda Manzano; Lucy Dreaming: Micaella Raz, Andrea Garcia; Surveillance: Jela Cuenca, Apple Dy; Grade Sex: Ataska, Aiko Garcia	
Araro	November 19	4	Topel Lee (director); Micaella Raz, Vince Rillon, Robb Guinto, Arah Alonzo, Dyessa Garcia, Cess Garcia, Jenn Rosa, Vern Kaye, Matt Francisco, Ronnie Lazaro	

=== 2025 ===
Title	Premiere	Number of episodes	Cast and crew	Ref
Wow Mani	January 7	6	Dominador Isip III (director); Janno Gibbs, Jenn Rosa, Denise Esteban, Zsara Laxamana, Chloe Jenna, Sunshine Guimary, Krista Miller, Yda Manzano, Skye Gonzaga, Salome Salvi, Christy Imperial, Sahara Bernales, Ada Hermosa, Candy Veloso, Lea Bernabe, Aliya Raymundo, Angeline Aril, Sheena Cole, Nico Locco, Aeron Carmelo	

== Special interests ==
=== 2024 ===
Title	Release date	Cast and crew	Ref
Seksi: Pantasya at Pelikula	January 28	AJ Raval, Alma Moreno, Angeli Khang, Jay Manalo, Katya Santos, Maui Taylor, Rosanna Roces, Sean de Guzman, Stephanie Raz, Angela Morena, Jose Javier Reyes, Roman Perez Jr.	
Climax	December 24	Rodante Pajemna Jr. (director); Robb Guinto, Apple Dy	

=== 2025 ===
Title	Release date	Cast and crew	Ref
Arouse	March 25	Rodante Pajemna Jr. (director); Aiko Garcia, Jenn Rosa	
Deep Inside: Angeli Khang	April 29	Christian Paolo Lat (director); Ataska	
Kiss/Kiss	May 27	Sigrid Polon (director); Micaella Raz, Zsara Laxamana	
All Out with AJ Raval	June 17	Christian Paolo Lat (director); Dyessa Garcia	
VMX Kama Sutra	July 15	Carlo Alvarez (director); Ataska	
Pasilip ni Azi: The Steamiest Moments of Azi Acosta	August 26	Bobby Bonifacio Jr. (director); Stephanie Raz	
Todo Kayod	September 16	Roman Perez Jr. (director); Angela Morena	
Patikim ni Robb Guinto	October 14	Carby Salvador (director); Christy Imperial	
Bigay Hilig: Sexual Fetish	November 11	Ray Gibraltar (director); Skye Gonzaga	
VMX Rewind: The Best of VMX 2025	December 9	Carby Salvador (director); Zsara Laxamana	

=== 2026 ===
Title	Release date	Cast and crew	Ref
Bagong Tukso	January 27	Rodante Pajemna Jr. (director); Margaret Diaz, Allison Ross, Apphle Celso, Heart Fox	
Foreplay	February 3	Ray Gibraltar (director); Sheree Bautista	
Ligo	March 3	Roman Perez Jr. (director); Ayanna Misola	
Halina ni Aliya	April 14	Rodante Pajemna Jr. (director); Aliya Raymundo	
Pinay Kama Sutra	May 19	Ray Gibraltar (director); Ataska	
Christine Bermas: All The Way	June 2	Rodante Pajemna Jr. (director); Christine Bermas	
Barako	June 3	Rodante Pajemna Jr. (director); Nico Locco	
Kiskisan/Dibdiban	June 16	Ray Gibraltar (director); Apphle Celso, Christy Imperial	
Triple Threat	June 23	Christian Paolo Lat (director); Angela Morena, Micaella Raz, Stephanie Raz	
Kainan	July 7	Ray Gibraltar (director); Vern Kaye, Ashley Lopez	
Bagong Tukso 2	July 14	Rodante Pajemna Jr. (director); Angel Castro, Shannon Sizon, Shalanie de Vera, Kim Yashii, Akira Takamura	
Sex in Public	July 21	Christian Paolo Lat (director); Audrey Avila, Rinoa Halili	
Todo Kayod 2	July 28	Roman Perez Jr. (director); Sahara Bernales, Alecca Adarna	
Viva Hot Babes: Muling Pagbukaka	August 4	Bobby Bonifacio Jr. (director); Zsara Laxamana, Queenie de Mesa	
Daddy's Girl	August 11	Christian Paolo Lat (director); Astrid Lee	
VMX Tapes: Vol 1	August 18	Ray Gibraltar (director); Shannon Sizon	
Pinay Kama Sutra 3	August 25	Carlo Alvarez (director); Julianne Richards	
Masarap na Bawal	September 1	Lawrence Fajardo (director); Ashley Lopez	
POV: Pasilip on VMX	September 8	Carby Salvador (director); Rhian Rivera, Lea Bernabe	
Pinoy Sexy Classics: Mga Pelikulang Nagpalaki Sa'yo	September 15	Ray Gibraltar (director); Jamilla Obispo	
Masahe	September 22	Rodante Pajemna Jr. (director); Zsara Laxamana, Yasmin Alba, Joko Rivera	
Fresh Meat	September 26	Rodante Pajemna Jr. (director); Nico Valdez, Giro Del Rosario, Joko Rivera, James Vasquez	
Tatak Jenn Rosa	September 29	Christian Paolo Lat (director); Jenn Rosa	
VMX Tapes: Vol 2	October 2	Ray Gibraltar (director); Shannon Sizon	
Unang Pasok	October 6	Ray Gibraltar (director); Kim Yashii, Mayumi de Vera	
PantaXa Laiya: Uncut	October 13	Carlo Alvarez (director); Maui Taylor	
Pantasya ng Bayan: The Movies of Joyce Jimenez	October 20	Carby Salvador (director); Margaret Diaz	
Alindog ni Aiko	October 27	Christian Paolo Lat (director); Aiko Garcia	
Hot Moves	November 3	Sigrid Polon (director); Denise Esteban, Joy Basa	
Bida Max	November 10	Christian Paolo Lat (director); Shiena Yu, Alecca Adarna	
Pinoy Sexy Classics 2: Mga Pelikulang Nagpalaki Sa'yo	November 17	Carby Salvador (director); Micaella Raz	
Chinita	November 24	Lawrence Fajardo (director); Angeli Khang	
Morena	December 1	Sahara Bernales	

– a VMX Plus exclusive

== Transferred to Viva One ==
These original movies and series premiered in VMX in 2021 to 2022, before they were transferred to Viva's second streaming service Viva One (formerly Viva Prime) upon its launch on January 29, 2023.

Viva One caters to a general audience with wholesome, family-oriented content, while VMX targets mature viewers with provocative, bold, and adult-themed programming.

=== Original movies ===
2021

Release Date		Title	Production company	Cast and crew	Ref.
MARCH	5	Tililing	Viva Films / VinCentiments	Darryl Yap (director); Gina Pareño, Baron Geisler, Chad Kinis, Cai Cortez, Donnalyn Bartolome, Candy Pangilinan	
JUNE	11	Ang Babaeng Walang Pakiramdam	Viva Films / VinCentiments	Darryl Yap (director); Kim Molina, Jerald Napoles	
JULY	2	Gluta	Viva Films / VinCentiments	Darryl Yap (director); Ella Cruz, Juliana Parizcova Segovia	
JULY	16	The Other Wife	Viva Films	Prime Cruz (director); Joem Bascon, Rhen Escaño, Lovi Poe	
AUGUST	6	Revirginized	Viva Films / VinCentiments	Darryl Yap (director); Sharon Cuneta, Marco Gumabao	
AUGUST	13	Ikaw at Ako at ang Ending	Viva Films	Irene Emma Villamor (director); Kim Molina, Jerald Napoles	
SEPTEMBER	17	Bekis on the Run	Viva Films	Joel Lamangan (director); Christian Bables, Diego Loyzaga, Kylie Verzosa, Sean de Guzman	
OCTOBER	1	Ang Manananggal na Nahahati ang Puso	Viva Films / VinCentiments	Darryl Yap (director); Aubrey Caraan, Marco Gallo, Teresa Loyzaga, Gina Pareño	
OCTOBER	29	Sa Haba ng Gabi	Viva Films / Reality Entertainment	Miko Livelo (director); Candy Pangilinan, Jerald Napoles, Kim Molina	
NOVEMBER	5	Barumbadings	Viva Films / VinCentiments	Darryl Yap (director); Baron Geisler, Mark Anthony Fernandez, Jeric Raval	
NOVEMBER	17	Mang Jose	Viva Films / Project 8 Projects	Raynier Brizuela (director); Janno Gibbs, Manilyn Reynes, Bing Loyzaga, Jerald Napoles, Leo Martinez	
NOVEMBER	19	More Than Blue	Viva Films	Nuel Naval (director); JC Santos, Yassi Pressman	
DECEMBER	10	Dulo	Viva Films	Fifth Solomon (director); Diego Loyzaga, Barbie Imperial	

2022

Release Date		Title	Production company	Cast and crew	Ref.
JANUARY	28	Deception	Viva Films	Joel Lamangan (director); Claudine Barretto, Mark Anthony Fernandez	
FEBRUARY	25	Bahay na Pula	Viva Films / Center Stage Productions	Brillante Mendoza (director); Xian Lim, Julia Barretto, Marco Gumabao	
MARCH	4	The Last Five Years	Nokarin Entertainment Productions	Lemuel Lorca (director); Tom Rodriguez, Meg Imperial	
APRIL	8	Greed	Viva Films, Mesh Lab	Jeffrey Hidalgo (director); Nadine Lustre, Diego Loyzaga	
APRIL	15	366	Viva Films	Bela Padilla (director); Bela Padilla, Zanjoe Marudo, JC Santos	
APRIL	22	Habangbuhay	Viva Films	Real Florido (director); McCoy de Leon, Elisse Joson	
OCTOBER	12	May–December–January	Viva Films	McArthur Alejandre (director); Andrea Del Rosario, Kych Minemoto, Gold Aceron	

=== Original series ===
2021

Title	Premiere	Number of episodes	Cast and crew	Ref
Parang Kayo Pero Hindi	February 12	6	RC Delos Reyes (director); Kylie Verzosa, Xian Lim, Marco Gumabao	
Kung Pwede Lang	March 5	8	Darryl Yap (director); Carlyn Ocampo, Rosanna Roces	

2022

Title	Premiere	Number of episodes	Cast and crew	Ref
The Seniors	March 26	8	Shaira Advincula (director); Julia Barretto, Ella Cruz, Awra Briguela, Andrea Babierra	
