= List of Philippine films of 2023 =

This is an incomplete list of Filipino full-length films, both mainstream and independently produced, released in theaters and cinemas in 2023. Some films are in production but do not have definite release dates.

== Box office ==
The highest-grossing Filipino films released in 2023, by domestic box office gross revenue, are as follows:

Highest-grossing films of 2023

- – an entry film for Metro Manila Film Festival.

Rank	Title	Distributor	Box office
1	Rewind	Star Cinema, APT Entertainment, AgostoDos Pictures	₱924 million
2	Mallari	Mentorque Productions, Clever Minds Inc.	₱225 million
3	A Very Good Girl	Star Cinema	₱100 million
4	Five Breakups and a Romance	GMA Films, Cornerstone Studios, Myriad Entertainment	₱100 million

== January–March ==
Opening		Title	Production company	Cast and crew	Ref.
J A N U A R Y	6	Panibugho	Viva Films / Vivamax	Iar Arondaing (director); Angela Morena, Stephanie Raz, Micaella Raz, Kiko Estrada	
J A N U A R Y	8	That Boy in the Dark	BMW8 Entertainment Art Services	Adolfo Alix Jr. (director); Joaquin Domagoso, Kiko Imapo, Aneeza Gutierrez	
J A N U A R Y	13	Nightbird	Viva Films / Vivamax	Law Fajardo (director); Christine Bermas, Sid Lucero, Felix Roco	
J A N U A R Y	18	Girlfriend Na Pwede Na	Viva Films	Benedict Mique (director); Kim Molina, Jerald Napoles, Gab Lagman	
J A N U A R Y	18	I Love Lizzy	Star Magic / MAVX Productions	RC delos Reyes (director); Carlo Aquino, Barbie Imperial	
J A N U A R Y	20	Tag-init	Viva Films / Vivamax / LargaVista Entertainment	Jose Javier Reyes (director); Franki Russell, Yen Durano, Ali Asistio	
J A N U A R Y	21	In My Mother's Skin	Amazon Studios / Epicmedia / Zhao Wei Films / Volos Films / Clover Films	Kenneth Dagatan (director/screenplay); Beauty Gonzalez, Felicity Kyle Napuli, Jasmine Curtis-Smith, James Mavie Estrella, Angeli Bayani	
J A N U A R Y	23	Distortion	Studio Moonchalk	Frederick C.G. Borromeo (director)	
J A N U A R Y	25	Hello, Universe!	Viva Films	Xian Lim (director); Janno Gibbs, Anjo Yllana, Benjie Paras, Maui Taylor, Sunshine Guimary, Gene Padilla, MJ Cayabyab, Madelaine Red, Joe Vargas, Majo Lingat	
J A N U A R Y	27	Bela Luna	Viva Films / Vivamax	Mac Alejandre (director); Angeli Khang, Mark Anthony Fernandez, Kiko Estrada, Millen Gal, Julio Diaz, Nicco Manalo	
J A N U A R Y	28	Mang Kanor	AQ Prime	Greg Colasito (director); Rez Cortez, Nika Madrid, Rob Sy	
F E B R U A R Y	1	Spellbound	Viva Films	Jalz Zarate (director); Bela Padilla, Marco Gumabao	
F E B R U A R Y	3	Boso Dos	Viva Films / Vivamax / Pelipula Productions	Jon Red (director); Micaella Raz, Gold Aceron, Vince Rillon	
F E B R U A R Y	8	Latay (Battered Husband)	BG Productions International	Ralston Jover (director); Allen Dizon, Lovi Poe	
F E B R U A R Y	10	La Querida	Viva Films / Vivamax / Five 2 Seven Entertainment Production	GB Sampedro (director); Angela Morena, Jay Manalo, Mercedes Cabral, Arron Villaflor	
F E B R U A R Y	11	D' Aswang Slayerz	Amartha Entertainment Production	Ricky Rivero (director/screenplay); Mel Martinez, Athalia Badere, Sharmaine Arnaiz	
F E B R U A R Y	14	Baka Sakali	AQ Prime	Bong Ramos (director); Drei Arias, Leandre Adams	
F E B R U A R Y	15	Ten Little Mistresses	Amazon Prime Video / The IdeaFirst Company / Quantum Productions	Jun Lana (director); John Arcilla, Eugene Domingo, Carmi Martin, Agot Isidro, Pokwang, Kris Bernal, Arci Muñoz, Adrianna So, Kate Alejandrino, Iana Bernardez, Sharlene San Pedro	
F E B R U A R Y	15	Without You	OctoArts Films	RC delos Reyes (director); Shaira Diaz, David Licauco	
F E B R U A R Y	17	Lagaslas	Viva Films / Vivamax / Sixteen Degrees Entertainment Production / E-magine Creative Media / BC Entertainment Production	Christopher Novabos (director); Julio Diaz, Rubi Rubi, Arnold Reyes, Victor Relosa, Elora Españo, Maebelle Medina	
F E B R U A R Y	22	Ako si Ninoy	PhilStagers Films	Vincent Tañada (director); Juan Karlos Labajo, Sarah Holmes, Johnrey Rivas, Marlo Mortel, Joaquin Domagoso	
F E B R U A R Y	24	Suki	Viva Films / Vivamax / Grand Larain Productions	Albert Langitan (director); Azi Acosta, John Rhey Flores, Alona Navarro, Jiad Arroyo	
M A R C H	1	Martyr or Murderer	Viva Films, VinCentiments	Darryl Yap (director); Cesar Montano, Ruffa Gutierrez, Cristine Reyes, Diego Loyzaga, Ella Cruz, Isko Moreno	
M A R C H	1	Oras de Peligro	Siklab Productions	Joel Lamangan (director); Cherry Pie Picache, Allen Dizon	
M A R C H	3	Lawa	Viva Films / Vivamax	Phil Giordano (director); Cara Gonzales, Sean de Guzman, Jela Cuenca, Josef Elizalde	
M A R C H	3	Upuan	AQ Prime	Greg Colasito (director); Krista Miller, Andrew Gan, Nika Madrid	
M A R C H	10	Salamat Daks	Viva Films / Vivamax	Bobby Bonifacio, Jr. (director); Ayanna Misola, Nikko Natividad	
M A R C H	15	Kunwari Mahal Kita	Viva Films	Roderick Lindayag (director); Ryza Cenon, Joseph Marco	
M A R C H	17	Domme	Viva Films / Vivamax / Aliud Entertainment	Roman Perez, Jr. (director); Ava Mendez, Ali Asistio, Mark Anthony Fernandez	
M A R C H	22	Baby Boy, Baby Girl	Viva Films	Jason Paul Laxamana (director); Kylie Verzosa, Marco Gumabao	
M A R C H	23	Walang KaParis	Amazon Prime Video / Viva Films / Spring Films	Singrid Andrea Bernardo (director); Alessandra de Rossi, Empoy Marquez	
M A R C H	29	Working Boys 2: Choose Your Papa	Viva Films	Paolo Ohara (director); Wilbert Ross, Mikoy Morales, Nikko Natividad, Andrew Muhlach, Vitto Marquez	
M A R C H	31	Balik Taya	Viva Films / Vivamax	Roman Perez, Jr. (director); Angeli Khang, Jela Cuenca, Azi Acosta, Kiko Estrada	
M A R C H	31	Cuatro	AQ Prime	Roswill Hilario (director); Rico Barrera, Nika Madrid, Joni McNab, Jet Delgado	

== April–June ==
Opening		Title	Production company	Cast and crew	Ref.
A P R I L	8	About Us But Not About Us	The IdeaFirst Company, Quantum Films, Octoberian Films	Jun Lana (director); Romnick Sarmenta, Elijah Canlas	
A P R I L	8	Apag	Center Stage Productions	Brillante Mendoza (director); Coco Martin, Jaclyn Jose, Lito Lapid, Gladys Reyes	
A P R I L	8	Here Comes The Groom	Quantum Films, Cineko Productions, Brightlight Productions	Chris Martinez (director); Eugene Domingo, Enchong Dee, Xilhouete, Keempee de Leon, Awra Briguela, Maris Racal, KaladKaren	
A P R I L	8	Kahit Maputi Na Ang Buhok Ko	Saranggola Media Productions	Joven Tan (director); RK Bagatsing, Meg Imperial	
A P R I L	8	Love You Long Time	Studio Three Sixty, Inc.	JP Habac (director); Carlo Aquino, Eisel Serrano	
A P R I L	8	Single Bells	TINCAN	Fifth Solomon (director); Aljur Abrenica, Alex Gonzaga, Angeline Quinto	
A P R I L	8	Unravel: A Swiss Side Love Story	MAVX Productions	RC delos Reyes (director); Gerald Anderson, Kylie Padilla	
A P R I L	8	Yung Libro sa Napanood Ko	Viva Communications	Bela (director); Bela Padilla, Yoo Min-gon	
A P R I L	8	Paupahan	Viva Films / Vivamax / 316 Media Network	Louie Ignacio (director); Rob Guinto, Jiad Arroyo, Tiffany Grey	
A P R I L	19	Adik Sa'yo	Viva Films/ VinCentiments Entertainment	Nuel Naval (director); Cindy Miranda, JM de Guzman, Meg Imperial	
A P R I L	21	Sapul	Viva Films / Vivamax / ComGuild Productions	Reynold Giba (director); Christine Bermas, Kiko Estrada, Jeric Raval, Phoebe Walker	
A P R I L	21	Losers–1, Suckers–0	AQ Prime	Niokz Arcega (director); Ara Mina, Yana Fuentes, Marcus Madrigal	
A P R I L	26	Papa Mascot	WIDE International	Louie Ignacio (director); Ken Chan, Erin Espiritu, Miles Ocampo	
A P R I L	26	Sa Muli	Viva Films/The Fifth Studio	Fifth Solomon (director); Xian Lim, Ryza Cenon	
A P R I L	28	Sex Games	Viva Films / Vivamax	Mac Alejandre (director); Azi Acosta, Josef Elizalde, Sheree Bautista, Benz Sangalang	
M A Y	5	AFAM	Viva Films / Vivamax / Archangel Media	Linnet Zurbano (director); Robb Guinto, Jela Cuenca, Nico Locco	
M A Y	12	Fall Guy	Viva Films / Vivamax / 3:16 Media Network / Mentorque Productions	Joel Lamangan (director); Sean de Guzman, Tiffany Grey, Quinn Carillo	
M A Y	17	Beks Days of Our Lives	Viva Films / Pelikula Indiopendent	Chad Kinis (director); Chad Kinis, MC Muah, Lassy Marquez	
M A Y	18	Ang Mga Kaibigan ni Mama Susan	Amazon Prime Video, Black Sheep Productions, Regal Entertainment	Chito S. Roño (director); Joshua Garcia, Kelvin Miranda, Patrick Quiroz	
M A Y	19	Sandwich	Center Stage Productions / Vivamax / Center Stage Productions	Jao Elamparo (director); Andrea Garcia, Kat Dovey, Nico Locco, Luke Selby	
M A Y	24	Tricycle Driver, Kasangga Mo	Angel Film Productions	Karlo Montero (director); Vin Abrenica, Pekto, Sheila Falconer	
M A Y	26	Kabayo	Viva Films / Vivamax / LDG Productions / 4Blues Productions	Gianfranco Morciano (director); Julia Victoria, Apple Castro, Rico Barrera, Mara Flores	
J U N E	1	Missed Connections	Netflix	Jelise Chung (director); Miles Ocampo, Kelvin Miranda	
J U N E	2	Star Dancer	Viva Films / Vivamax	Pam Miras (director); Denise Esteban, Rose van Ginkel, Arron Villaflor	
J U N E	9	Hilom	Viva Films / Vivamax / Five 2 Seven Entertainment Production	GB Sampedro (director); Christine Bermas, Julia Victoria, Arron Villaflor	
J U N E	16	Hosto	Viva Films / Vivamax / Center Stage Productions	Jao Elamparo (director); Angela Morena, Denise Esteban, Vince Rillon, Jay Manalo, Alexa Ocampo	
J U N E	19	Sosyal Medya	AQ Prime	Greg Colasito (director); Brenda Mage, Kristof Garcia	
J U N E	21	Will You Be My Ex?	Viva Films	Real Florido (director); Julia Barretto, Diego Loyzaga, Bea Binene	
J U N E	21	The Revelation	House of Prime Films, Hand Held Entertainment Productions	Ray-an Dulay (director); Vin Abrenica, Aljur Abrenica, Jelai Andres, Ana Jalandoni	
J U N E	23	Tayuan	Viva Films / Vivamax / Two Inches of Loneliness	Topel Lee (director); Angeli Khang, Stephanie Raz, Chester Grecia, Rash Flores	
J U N E	28	Ang Pangarap Kong Oskars	MAVX Productions	Jules Katanyag (director); Paolo Contis, Joross Gamboa, Kate Alejandrino	
J U N E	30	Hugot	Viva Films / Vivamax / Lookback Pictures	Daniel Palacio (director); Azi Acosta, Stephanie Raz, Apple Castro, Benz Sangalang	

Color key

- – a Metro Manila Summer Film Festival entry film

== July–September ==
Opening		Title	Production company	Cast and crew	Ref.
J U L Y	7	Bugaw	Viva Films / Vivamax / Mesh Lab	Yam Laranas (director); Jay Manalo, Alexa Ocampo, Clifford Pusing, Ataska Mercado	
J U L Y	7	Seasons	Regal Entertainment / Netflix	Easy Ferrer (director); Lovi Poe, Carlo Aquino	
J U L Y	12	OFW: The Movie	Angel Film Productions	Neal Tan (director); Rafael Rosell, Dianne Medina, Kakai Bautista, Christian Vasquez, Sylvia Sanchez	
J U L Y	14	Home Service	Viva Films / Vivamax / 3:16 Media Network	Ma-an Aunscion-Dagñalan (director); Hershie de Leon, Angelica Cervantes, Mon Mendoza, Vance Larena	
J U L Y	19	Mary Cherry Chua	Viva Films	Roni S. Banaid (director); Joko Diaz, Kokoy de Santos, Lyca Gairanod, Abby Bautista	
J U L Y	21	Bisyo!	Viva Films / Vivamax	Daniel R. Palacio (director); Gold Aceron, Ataska Mercado, Angelica Hart, Aerol Carmelo, Mark Anthony Fernandez	
J U L Y	26	The Cheating Game	GMA Pictures	Rod Marmol (director); Julie Anne San Jose, Rayver Cruz	
J U L Y	26	Litrato	3:16 Media Network	Louie Ignacio (director); Ai-Ai delas Alas, Ara Mina, Liza Lorena, Bodjie Pascua, Quinn Carillo	
J U L Y	26	Babaylan	Viva Films / Viva One	Bona Fajardo (director); Jennifer Lee, Marco Gallo	
J U L Y	28	Litsoneras	Viva Films / Vivamax	Roman Perez Jr. (director); Yen Durano, Jamilla Obispo, Aerol Carmelo, Joko Diaz, Victor Relosa	
J U L Y	30	Taong Grasa	AQ Prime	Buboy Tan (director); Joni McNab, Andrew Gan, Manang Medina, Kurt Kendrick	
A U G U S T	2	Sa Kamay ng Diyos	JPM Productions	Zaldy Munda (director); Aljur Abrenica, Elizabeth Oropesa	
A U G U S T	4	Ang Duyan Ng Magiting	Sine Metu	Dustin Celestino (director); Dolly de Leon, Bituin Escalante, Agot Isidro, Miggy Jimenez	
A U G U S T	4	As If It's True	The IdeaFirst Company	John Rogers (director); Khalil Ramos, Ashley Ortega	
A U G U S T	4	Bulawan Nga Usa (Golden Deer)	Create PH Films, Mulave Studios, Green Pelican Studios	Kenneth dela Cruz (director); Ron Espinosa, John Niel Paguntalan	
A U G U S T	4	Gitling	United Straight Shooters Media	Jopy Arnaldo (director); Gabby Padilla, Ken Yamamura	
A U G U S T	4	Huling Palabas	Pelikula Indiopendent	Ryan Machado (director); Shun Mark Gomez, Bon Matthew Lentejas, Jay Gonzaga	
A U G U S T	4	Iti Mapupukaw (The Missing)	Project 8 Projects	Carl Joseph Papa (director); Carlo Aquino, Gio Gahol, Dolly de Leon	
A U G U S T	4	Maria	Terminal Six Post	Sheryl Rose Andes (director);	
A U G U S T	4	Rookie	Project 8 Projects, ANIMA Studios, Kumu	Samantha Lee (director); Aya Fernandez, Pat Tinguy, Agot Isidro	
A U G U S T	4	Tether		Gian Arre (director); Mikoy Morales, Jorrybell Agoto	
A U G U S T	4	When This Is All Over	ANIMA Studios	Kevin Mayuga (director); Juan Karlos	
A U G U S T	4	Marupok AF (Where Is The Lie?)	ANIMA Studios	Quark Henares (director); EJ Jallorina, Royce Cabrera, Maris Racal	
A U G U S T	4	Manyak	Viva Films / Vivamax / Alcazar Films / Blackbox Studios / J-Dreamstar Entertainment	Carlo Alvarez (director); Christine Bermas, Nico Locco, Sheree Bautista, Joko Diaz	
A U G U S T	9	The Ship Show	Viva Films	Jason Paul Laxamana (director); Heaven Peralejo, Marco Gallo	
A U G U S T	11	Kamadora	Viva Films / Vivamax	Roman Perez Jr. (director); Tiffany Grey, Victor Relosa, Armina Alegre	
A U G U S T	16	Third World Romance	Black Sheep Productions	Dwein Baltazar (director); Carlo Aquino, Charlie Dizon	
A U G U S T	16	Badge of Honor	Pinoy Flix	Neal Tan (director); Rommel Padilla, Jeric Raval, Empress Schuck, Rayver Cruz, Alfred Vargas	
A U G U S T	18	Kahalili	Viva Films / Vivamax	Bobby Bonifacio Jr. (director); Stephanie Raz, Millen Gal, Sid Lucero, Victor Relosa, Mercedes Cabral	
A U G U S T	23	Wish You Were The One	Viva Films	Derick Cabrido (director); Bela Padilla, JC Santos	
A U G U S T	25	Sugapa	Viva Films / Vivamax	Law Fajardo (director); AJ Raval, Aljur Abrenica	
A U G U S T	30	Swing	MAVX Productions	RC delos Reyes (director); Jane Oineza, RK Bagatsing	
A U G U S T	30	Monday First Screening	Net25 Films	Benedict Mique (director); Ricky Davao, Gina Alajar	
S E P T E M B E R	1	Call Me Alma	Viva Films / Vivamax	Mac Alejandre (director); Azi Acosta, Jaclyn Jose	
S E P T E M B E R	6	Kidnap for Romance	Viva Films	Victor Villanueva (director); Cristine Reyes, Empoy Marquez	
S E P T E M B E R	7	What If	Viva Films / A World Of Our Own / Netflix	Emmanuel Q. Palo (director); Alessandra De Rossi, JM de Guzman	
S E P T E M B E R	8	Punit Na Langit	Viva Films / Vivamax	Rodante Pajemna (director); Tiffany Grey, Apple Dy	
S E P T E M B E R	13	Huling Sayaw	Camerrol Entertainment Productions	Errol Ropero (director); Bugoy Cariño, Belle Mariano	
S E P T E M B E R	15	Patikim-Tikim	Viva Films / Vivamax / LargaVista Entertainment	Jose Javier Reyes (director); Yen Durano, Apple Dy, Chloe Jenna	
S E P T E M B E R	15	The Blind Soldiers	Empowerment Film Production	Ronald Adamat (director); Ronald Adamat, Gary Lim, Soliman Cruz, Long Mejia, Bong Cabrera	
S E P T E M B E R	20	Video City: Be Kind Please Rewind	Viva Films, GMA Pictures	Reynier Brizuela (director); Yassi Pressman, Ruru Madrid	
S E P T E M B E R	22	Ligaw na Bulaklak	Viva Films / Vivamax / Great Media Productions	Jeffrey Hidalgo (director); Chloe Jenna, Arron Villaflor	
S E P T E M B E R	26	The Last Resort	Goblin Films	Dave Lao and Jay Altarejos (director); Paolo Paraiso, Erin Ocampo, Oliver Aquino, Rolando Inocencio	
S E P T E M B E R	27	A Very Good Girl	Star Cinema	Petersen Vargas (director); Kathryn Bernardo, Dolly de Leon	
S E P T E M B E R	29	BJJ: Woman on Top	Viva Films / Vivamax / Two Inches of Loneliness	Linnet Zurbano (director); Angela Morena, Yuki Sakamoto, Jiad Arroyo, Alexa Ocampo	

Color key

- – a Cinemalaya Philippine Independent Film Festival entry film

== October–December ==
Opening		Title	Production company	Cast and crew	Ref.
O C T O B E R	3	Ang Mga Halang	Third Millennium Projects	Ferdinand Galang (director/screenplay); Richard Quan, Kiko Matos, Rob Sy, Vic Romano, Oz Gonzalez, Aris Ramos, Lou Veloso, Lui Quiambao-Manansala, Shane Patrick-Carrera	
O C T O B E R	4	Keys to the Heart	Netflix	Kerwin Go (director); Zanjoe Marudo, Elijah Canlas, Dolly de Leon	
O C T O B E R	6	Langitngit	Viva Films / Vivamax / White Space Digital Studios	Christopher Novabos (director); Manang Medina, Itan Rosales, Ruby Ruiz, Zia Zamora, Erika Balagtas	
O C T O B E R	11	Instant Daddy	Viva Films	Crisanto Aquino (director); Jerald Napoles, Ryza Cenon, Althea Ruedas	
O C T O B E R	12	In My Mother’s Skin	Epicmedia / Zhao Wei Films / Volos Films / Clover Films / Amazon Studios	Kenneth Dagatan (director); Beauty Gonzales, Jasmine Curtis-Smith	
O C T O B E R	13	Ahasss	Viva Films / Vivamax / Mavx Productions	Ato Bautista (director); Angela Morena, Janelle Tee	
O C T O B E R	18	Five Breakups and a Romance	GMA Pictures, Cornerstone Entertainment	Irene Villamor (director); Alden Richards, Julia Montes	
O C T O B E R	20	Haliparot	Viva Films / Vivamax	Bobby Bonifacio Jr. (director); Maui Taylor, Aiko Garcia, Aerol Carmelo, Matt Francisco	
O C T O B E R	27	Sila Ay Akin	Viva Films / Vivamax	Mac Alejandre (director); Angeli Khang, Azi Acosta, Vince Rillon, Victor Relosa	
N O V E M B E R	3	Tuhog	Viva Films / Vivamax / Five 2 Seven Entertainment Production	GB Sampedro (director); Apple Dy, Arron Villaflor, Joko Diaz	
N O V E M B E R	8	Nagalit ang Patay sa Haba ng Lamay: Da Resbak	JPM Productions	Karlo Montero (director); Jeric Raval, Ali Forbes, Alfred Montero, Bembol Roco, Ricardo Cepeda	
N O V E M B E R	10	Japino	Viva Films / Vivamax / Center Stage Productions	Freidric Macapagal Cortez (director); Denise Esteban, Ali Asistio, Angela Morena, Vince Rillon	
N O V E M B E R	15	Ma'am Chief: Shakedown in Seoul	Pulp Studios	Kring Kim (director); Melai Cantiveros, Karylle, Alora Sasam,Jennica Garcia	
N O V E M B E R	17	Salakab	Viva Films / Vivamax / Pelikula Indiopendent	Roman Perez, Jr. (director); Angeli Khang, Benz Sangalang, Jomari Angeles	
N O V E M B E R	22	Marita	Viva Films	Roni Benaid (director); Louise delos Reyes, Rhen Escaño	
N O V E M B E R	24	Sugar Baby	Viva Films / Vivamax	Christian Paolo Lat (director); Azi Acosta, Robb Guinto	
N O V E M B E R	29	Shake, Rattle & Roll Extreme	Regal Entertainment	Richard Somes, Jerrold Tarog, Joey de Guzman (directors); Iza Calzado, Jane Oineza, RK Bagatsing, Paul Salas, AC Bonifacio, Jane de Leon, Paolo Gumabao	
N O V E M B E R	29	In His Mother's Eyes	7K Entertainment Productions	FM Reyes (director); Maricel Soriano, Roderick Paulate	
D E C E M B E R	1	Ganti-Ganti	Viva Films / Vivamax	Mac Alejandre (director); Angeli Khang, Yen Durano, Sean de Guzman, Mark Anthony Fernandez	
D E C E M B E R	6	Ikaw at Ako	Viva Films	Retchie del Carmen (director); Paolo Contis, Rhian Ramos	
D E C E M B E R	8	Haslers	Viva Films / Vivamax / 3:16 Media Network	Jose Abdel Langit (director); Denise Esteban, Quinn Carillo, Hershie de Leon, Angelica Cervantes	
D E C E M B E R	8	Raging Grace	Brainstorm Media	Paris Zarcilla (director); Max Eigenmann, Jaeden Paige Boadilla, Leanne Best	
D E C E M B E R	13	Unspoken Letters	Utmost Creative Motion Pictures	Gat Alaman (director); Jhassy Busran, Tonton Gutierrez, Gladys Reyes	
D E C E M B E R	13	Para Kang Papa Mo	Viva Films / VinCentiments	Darryl Yap (director); Mark Anthony Fernandez, Nikko Natividad	
D E C E M B E R	15	Higop	Viva Films / Vivamax / Two Inches of Loneliness	Topel Lee (director); Angelica Hart, Josef Elizalde, Fabio Ide	
D E C E M B E R	22	Foursome	Viva Films / Vivamax / Ray	Gavino Roecha (director); Robb Guinto, Armina Alegre, Nico Locco, Mark Dionisio	
D E C E M B E R	25	Becky & Badette	The IdeaFirst Company / OctoberTrain Films	Jun Lana (director); Eugene Domingo, Pokwang	
D E C E M B E R	25	Broken Hearts Trip	BMC Films / Smart Films	Lemuel Lorca (director); Christian Bables, Jaclyn Jose	
D E C E M B E R	25	Family of Two	Axinite Digicinema Inc. / Cineko Productions / MC Entertainment	Nuel Naval (director); Sharon Cuneta, Alden Richards	
D E C E M B E R	25	Firefly	Axinite Digicinema Inc. / GMA Pictures / GMA Public Affairs / Viva Films	Zig Dulay (director); Alessandra de Rossi, Euwenn Mikaell, Miguel Tanfelix, Ysabel Ortega	
D E C E M B E R	25	GomBurZa	Solar Pictures / Jesuit Communications Foundation / CMB Film Services	Pepe Diokno (director); Dante Rivero, Cedrick Juan, Enchong Dee	
D E C E M B E R	25	Kampon	Quantum Films / Brightlight Productions	King Palisoc (director); Beauty Gonzalez, Derek Ramsay	
D E C E M B E R	25	Mallari	Warner Bros. Pictures / Mentorque Productions / Clever Minds Inc.	Derick Cabrido (director); Piolo Pascual, Janella Salvador	
D E C E M B E R	25	Penduko	Viva Films / Sari-Sari Films / Studio Viva / MQuest Ventures / Epik Studios / Ninuno Media	Jason Paul Laxamana (director); Matteo Guidicelli, Cristine Reyes	
D E C E M B E R	25	Rewind	Star Cinema / APT Entertainment / AgostoDos Pictures	Mae Cruz-Alviar (director); Dingdong Dantes, Marian Rivera	
D E C E M B E R	25	When I Met You in Tokyo	Rafaella Films International / JG Productions	Rado Peru (director); Vilma Santos, Christopher de Leon	
D E C E M B E R	29	Hibang	Viva Films / Vivamax / Blvck Films / Pelikula Indiopendent	Sigrid Polon (director); Rica Gonzales, Ali Asistio, Sahara Bernales	

Color key

- – a QCinema International Film Festival entry film
- – a Metro Manila Film Festival entry film
