= List of Philippine films of 2022 =

This is an incomplete list of Filipino full-length films, both mainstream and independently produced, released in theaters and cinemas in 2022. Some films are in production but do not have definite release dates.

== Box office ==
- – an entry film for Metro Manila Film Festival.

Highest-grossing films of 2022
Rank	Title	Distributor	Domestic gross	Ref.
1	Deleter	Viva Films	₱270 million	
2	Partners in Crime	Star Cinema	₱168 million	

== January–March ==
Opening		Title	Production company	Cast and crew	Ref.
J A N U A R Y	7	Siklo	Viva Films / Vivamax	Roman Perez Jr. (director); Vince Rillon, Christine Bermas	
J A N U A R Y	14	Hugas	Viva Films / Vivamax	Ramon Perez Jr. (director); Sean de Guzman, AJ Raval	
J A N U A R Y	19	Sisid	Viva Films / Vivamax / Center Stage Productions	Brillante Mendoza (director); Kylie Verzosa, Vince Rillon, Christine Bermas, Paolo Gumabao	
J A N U A R Y	21	Reroute	Viva Films / Vivamax	Lawrence Fajardo (director); John Arcilla, Cindy Miranda, Sid Lucero, Nathalie Hart	
J A N U A R Y	21	Yorme: The Isko Domagoso Story	Saranggola Media Productions / Viva Films	Joven Tan (director); Xian Lim, McCoy de Leon, Raikko Mateo, Isko Moreno	
J A N U A R Y	28	Deception	Viva Films / Vivamax	Joel Lamangan (director); Claudine Barretto, Mark Anthony Fernandez	
J A N U A R Y	28	Eyes on Fire	Viva Films / Vivamax	McArthur C. Alejandre (director); Ricky Lee (screenplay); Angeli Khang, Paolo Gumabao, Sid Lucero, Jela Cuenca, Dexter Doria	
F E B R U A R Y	4	Kinsenas, Katapusan	Viva Films / Vivamax / Five 2 Seven Entertainment Production	GB Sampedro (director); Ayanna Misola, Joko Diaz, Jamilla Obispo, Angela Morena, Janelle Tee, Madelaine Red	
F E B R U A R Y	10	Takas	Hand Held Entertainment Production	Ray An Dulay (director); Teejay Marquez, Janelle Lewis, David Chua, Rob Sy, Marvin Yap, John Lapus, Easy Ferrer	
F E B R U A R Y	11	The Wife	Viva Films / Vivamax	Denise O'Hara (director); Louise delos Reyes, Diego Loyzaga, Cara Gonzales	
F E B R U A R Y	18	Boy Bastos	Viva Films / Vivamax	Victor Villanueva (director); Wilbert Ross, Rose Van Ginkel, Rob Guinto, Jela Cuenca, Andrew Muhlach, Bob Jbeili	
F E B R U A R Y	25	Bahay na Pula	Viva Films / Vivamax	Brillante Mendoza (director); Xian Lim, Julia Barretto, Marco Gumabao	
F E B R U A R Y	26	Tres	Alcazar Films	Carlo Alvarez (director); Jiro Custodio, Duane David, Vas Palacay	
M A R C H	4	The Last Five Years	Viva Films / Vivamax	Lemuel Lorca (director); Tom Rodriguez, Meg Imperial	
M A R C H	11	Adarna Gang	Viva Films / Vivamax / Pelipula Productions	John Red (director); Coleen Garcia, JC Santos, Diego Loyzaga, Ronnie Lazaro, Mark Anthony Fernandez, Jay Manalo, Shamaine Buencamino, Mickey Ferriols	
M A R C H	18	Moonlight Butterfly	Viva Films / Vivamax / 3:16 Media Network	Joel Lamangan (director); Christine Bermas, Kit Thompson, Albie Casiño	
M A R C H	23	The Buy Bust Queen	Pinoyflix Films / Philippine Drug Enforcement Agency	JR Olinares (director); Lawrence Nicodemus (screenplay); Phoebe Walker, Gen. Wilkins Villanueva, Ritz Azul, Maxine Medina, Elaine Ochoa, Ayeesha Cervantes, Cheng Alessa, Ameera Johara, Ervic Vijandre, Alex Medina	
M A R C H	25	X-Deal 2	Viva Films / Vivamax	Lawrence Fajardo (director); Rob Guinto, Angela Morena, Josef Elizalde	

== April–June ==
Opening		Title	Production company	Cast and crew	Ref.
A P R I L	1	Island of Desire	Viva Films / Vivamax	Joel Lamangan (director); Christine Bermas, Jela Cuenca, Sean De Guzman	
A P R I L	6	Dok	Donya Productions	Maria Angela de Ramos (director); Enzo Pineda, Mickey Ferriols	
A P R I L	8	Greed	Viva Films / Vivamax	Jeffrey Hidalgo (director); Nadine Lustre, Diego Loyzaga	
A P R I L	15	366	Viva Films / Vivamax	Bela Padilla (director); Bela Padilla, Zanjoe Marudo, JC Santos	
A P R I L	22	Habangbuhay	Viva Films / Vivamax	Real Florido (director); McCoy de Leon, Elisse Joson	
A P R I L	27	Rooftop	Viva Films	Yam Laranas (director); Ryza Cenon, Marco Gumabao, Ella Cruz, Rhen Escaño, Marco Gallo, Andrew Muhlach, Epy Quizon	
A P R I L	29	Kaliwaan	Viva Films / Vivamax / Center Stage Productions	Daniel Palacio (director); AJ Raval, Vince Rillon, Mark Anthony Fernandez, Denise Esteban	
M A Y	6	Doblado	Viva Films / Vivamax / Five 2 Seven Entertainment Production	GB Sampedro (director); Denise Esteban, Josef Elizalde, Mark Anthony Fernandez, Katrina Dovey, Gwen Garci	
M A Y	13	Putahe	Viva Films / Vivamax	Roman Perez Jr. (director); Ayanna Misola, Janelle Tee	
M A Y	20	Ikaw Lang ang Mahal	Viva Films / Vivamax	Richard Somes (director); Kylie Verzosa, Zanjoe Marudo, Cara Gonzales	
M A Y	27	Pusoy	Viva Films / Vivamax / Center Stage Productions	Phil Giordano (director); Angeli Khang, Vince Rillon, Janelle Tee, Baron Geisler	
J U N E	3	Breathe Again	Viva Films / Vivamax / RF Film Productions	Raffy Francisco (director); Ariella Arida, Tony Labrusca, Ivan Padilla, Jela Cuenca, Efren Reyes Jr., Liz Alindogan, Raquel Monteza, Rey Abellana, Millen Galang	
J U N E	10	Secrets	Viva Films / LargaVista Entertainment / Vivamax / LargaVista Entertainment	Jose Javier Reyes (director/screenplay); Janelle Tee, Felix Roco, Benz Sangalang, Denise Esteban	
J U N E	22	Ngayon Kaya	T-Rex Entertainment / WASD Films	Prime Cruz (director); Janine Gutierrez, Paulo Avelino	
J U N E	24	Virgin Forest	Viva Films / Vivamax / Center Stage Productions	Brillante Mendoza (director); Sid Lucero, Angeli Khang, Vince Rillon, Rob Guinto, Kat Dovey	
J U N E	29	Pa-Thirsty	Viva Films / Vivamax / Powerhouse Media Capital / The IdeaFirst Company	Ivan Payawal (director); Adrianna So, Kych Minemoto, Alex Diaz, Chad Kinis, Kate Alejandrino, Bob Jbeili, Rey Abellana	

== July–September ==
Opening		Title	Production company	Cast and crew	Ref.
J U L Y	1	Biyak	Viva Films / Vivamax / 3:16 Media Network	Joel Lamangan (director); Angelica Cervantes, Albie Casiño, Quinn Carillo, Vance Larena	
J U L Y	8	Kitty K7	Viva Films / Vivamax / Project 8	Joy Aquino (director); Rose Van Ginkel, Marco Gallo	
J U L Y	15	Ang Babaeng Nawawala Sa Sarili	Viva Films / Vivamax	Roman Perez Jr. (director); Ayanna Misola, Diego Loyzaga	
J U L Y	22	Connected	Star Magic Studios	Theodore Boborol (director); Amanda Zamora, Chico Alicaya, Richard Juan, Gail Banawis, Ralph Malibunas, Kobie Brown, Andi Abaya	
J U L Y	22	Madawag ang Landas Patungong Pag-asa	New Sunrise Films	Joel Lamangan (director); Rita Daniela, Jak Roberto, Albie Casiño	
J U L Y	22	Tahan	3:16 Media Network / Mentorque Productions / Vivamax	Bobby Bonifacio Jr. (director); Cloe Barreto, JC Santos, Jaclyn Jose	
J U L Y	29	Scorpio Nights 3	Viva Films / Vivamax	Lawrence Fajardo (director); Christine Bermas, Mark Anthony Fernandez, Gold Aceron	
J U L Y	29	The Entitled	Netflix	Theodore Boborol (director); Alex Gonzaga, JC De Vera, Ara Mina, Johnny Revilla, Melai Cantiveros, Andi Abaya	
J U L Y	29	Tuloy… Bukas ang Pinto	ALT Entertainment Production	Ipe Felino (director); Rosanna Roces, Ana Jalandoni, Jenny Miller, Long Mejia, Dagul, Mahal, Rolando Inocencio	
A U G U S T	3	Maid in Malacañang	Viva Films / VinCentiments	Darryl Yap (director); Cesar Montano, Ruffa Gutierrez, Cristine Reyes, Diego Loyzaga, Ella Cruz, Elizabeth Oropesa, Karla Estrada, Beverly Salviejo	
A U G U S T	3	Katips	Philstagers Films	Vincent M. Tañada (director/screenplay); Jerome Ponce, Vince Tañada, Mon Confiado, Sazchna Laparan	
A U G U S T	3	Bakas ni Yamashita	White Eagle Film Productions	Danny Ugali (director); Ahron Villena, Alfred Montero	
A U G U S T	5	Kargo	Cinemalaya Foundation	TM Malones (director); Max Eigenmann, Jess Mendoza, Myles Robles, Ronnie Lazaro	
A U G U S T	5	12 Weeks	Cinemalaya Foundation	Anna Isabelle Matutina (director); Max Eigenmann, Bing Pimentel, Vance Larena, Claudia Enriquez	
A U G U S T	5	Ginhawa	Cinemalaya Foundation	Christian Paolo Lat (director); Andrew Ramsay, Ruby Ruiz, Dido de la Paz, Orlando Inocencio	
A U G U S T	5	Blue Room	Cinemalaya Foundation	Ma-an L. Asuncion-Dagñalan (director); Juan Karlos, Harvey Bautista, Nourijune, Keoni Jin, Elijah Canlas	
A U G U S T	5	Batsoy	Cinemalaya Foundation	Ronald Batallones (director); Ethan Sean Sotto, Markko Cambas, Karen Laurrie Mendoz, Nathan J. Sotto, Jonalie Asdolo	
A U G U S T	5	Retirada	Cinemalaya Foundation	Cynthia Cruz-Paz and Milo Alto Paz (directors); Peewee O'Hara, Jerry O'Hara, Donna Carriaga, Dexter Doria, Nanding Josef, Lui Manansala, Johana Basanta	
A U G U S T	5	Bakit Di Mo Sabihin?	Cinemalaya Foundation	Real Florido (director); Janine Gutierrez, JC de Vera	
A U G U S T	5	Angkas	Cinemalaya Foundation	Rain Yamson II (director); Joem Bascon, Benjamin Alves, Meryll Soriano, Jolo Estrada	
A U G U S T	5	Kaluskos	Cinemalaya Foundation	Roman Perez Jr. (director); Coleen Garcia, Queenzy Calma, Karl Medina, Cara Gonzales, Elora Españo	
A U G U S T	5	Bula Sa Langit	Cinemalaya Foundation	Sheenly Gener (director); Gio Gahol, Kate Alejandrino	
A U G U S T	5	The Baseball Player	Cinemalaya Foundation	Carlo Obispo (director); Tommy Alejandrino, JM San Jose, Tess Antonio	
A U G U S T	5	Purificacion	Viva Films / Vivamax / Five 2 Seven Entertainment Production	GB Sampedro (director); Cara Gonzales, Josef Elizalde, Ava Mendez, Rob Guinto, Kat Dovey, Stephanie Raz, Quinn Carrillo	
A U G U S T	8	Huling Lamay	AQ Prime Stream	Joven Tan (director); Marlo Mortel, Buboy Villar, Lou Veloso	
A U G U S T	8	Adonis X	AQ Prime Stream	Alejandro Ramos (director); Kristof Garcia, Mark McMahon, Jaycee Domincel, Kurt Kendrick, Grace Vargas	
A U G U S T	8	Bingwit	AQ Prime Stream	Neal Tan (director); Krista Miller, Drei Arias, Conan King	
A U G U S T	8	La Traidora	AQ Prime Stream	Bong Ramos (director); Joni McNab, Brylle Mondejar, OJ Arci, Mia Aquino, Juan Calma, Ricardo Cepeda	
A U G U S T	8	Way of the Cross	Kaizen Studios	Antonio Díaz, and Gorio Vicuna (directors); Anthony Diaz V, Roxanne Barcelo, Alvin Anson, Manu Respall, Miguel Vasquez, Oz Rivera, Isay Alvarez, Rafael Rosell, Yussef Estevez, Jordan Castillo, Elaine Lozano, Danielle Chopin, Vic Romano, Apollo Abraham	
A U G U S T	12	The Influencer	3:16 Media Network / Mentorque Productions / Vivamax	Louie Ignacio (director); Cloe Barreto, Sean de Guzman	
A U G U S T	15	How To Love Mr. Heartless	Viva Films / Ninuno Media / Amazon Prime Video	Jason Paul Laxamana (director); Sue Ramirez, Diego Loyzaga	
A U G U S T	19	Lampas Langit	Viva Films / Vivamax / Great Media Productions	Jeffrey Hidalgo (director); Christine Bermas, Baron Geisler, Ricky Davao, Chloe Jenna, Milana Ikemoto, Ivan Padilla, Quinn Carrillo	
A U G U S T	24	Kuta	ECL Multimedia Productions / KTX.ph	Omar Deroca (director); Buboy Villar, Tita Krissy Achino, Nico Locco, Renerich Ocon, Yakki Ronquillo, Pearl Gonzales, Jelai Andres	
A U G U S T	26	Sitio Diablo	Viva Films / Vivamax	Roman Perez Jr. (director); AJ Raval, Kiko Estrada	
A U G U S T	27	Walker	New Sunrise Films	Joel Lamangan (director); Allen Dizon, Sunshine Dizon, Edgar Allan Guzman, Elora Españo	
S E P T E M B E R	2	Bula	Viva Films / Vivamax	Bobby Bonifacio Jr. (director); Ayanna Misola, Gab Lagman, Mon Confiado, Rob Guinto, Francis Magundayao, Massimo Scofield	
S E P T E M B E R	9	#DoYouThinkIAmSEXY?	Viva Films / Vivamax / Great Media Productions	Dennis Marasigan (director); Cloe Barreto, Marco Gomez, Chloe Jenna	
S E P T E M B E R	10	Pula Ang Kulay ng Gabi	AQ Prime Stream	Jojo Nadela (director); Aljur Abrenica, Yanna Fuentes, Zia Zamora, Elijah Filamor, Soliman Cruz	
S E P T E M B E R	14	Expensive Candy	Viva Films / Ninuno Media	Jason Paul Laxamana (director); Carlo Aquino, Julia Barretto	
S E P T E M B E R	16	The Escort Wife	Viva Films / Vivamax / Mesh Lab	Paul Alexei Basinillo (director); Janelle Tee, Ava Mendez, Raymond Bagatsing	
S E P T E M B E R	23	5 in 1	Viva Films / Vivamax / Five 2 Seven Entertainment Production	GB Sampedro (director); Wilbert Ross, Debbie Garcia, Rose van Ginkel, Ava Mendez, Angela Morena, Jela Cuenca	
S E P T E M B E R	28	Always	Viva Films	Dado Lumibao (director); Kim Chiu, Xian Lim	
S E P T E M B E R	30	Girl Friday	Viva Films / Vivamax	Joel Lamangan (director); Angeli Khang, Jay Manalo, Jela Cuenca, Massimo Scofield, Stephanie Raz, Hershie de Leon, Jim Pebanco	

Color key

- – a Cinemalaya Philippine Independent Film Festival entry film
- – a Pista ng Pelikulang Pilipino entry film
- – a ToFarm (The Outstanding Farmers in the Philippines) Film Festival entry film

== October–December ==
Opening		Title	Production company	Cast and crew	Ref.
O C T O B E R	5	Two and One	Viva Films / Vivamax / The IdeaFirst Company	Ivan Andrew Payawal (director); Cedrick Juan, Miggy Jimenez, Paolo Pangilinan	
O C T O B E R	7	Pabuya	Viva Films / Vivamax	Phil Giordano (director); Diego Loyzaga, Franki Russell	
O C T O B E R	7	Doll House	Netflix	Marla Ancheta (director); Baron Geisler, Althea Ruedas	
O C T O B E R	12	May–December-January	Viva Films	Mac Alejandre (director); Andrea Del Rosario, Kych Minemoto, Gold Aceron	
O C T O B E R	14	Relyebo	Viva Films / Vivamax	Crisanto Aquino (director); Sean de Guzman, Christine Bermas, Jela Cuenca, Jeric Raval, Lara Morena, Carlene Aguilar, Jeffrey Hidalgo, Juliana Pariscova	
O C T O B E R	21	Tubero	Viva Films / Vivamax / Archangel Media	Topel Lee (director); Vince Rillon, Angela Morena, Jem Milton, Alona Navarro	
O C T O B E R	28	Selina's Gold	Viva Films / Vivamax	Mac Alejandre (director); Angeli Khang, Gold Aceron, Jay Manalo	
O C T O B E R	29	Katok	AQ Prime Stream	Joven Tan (director); Ara Mina, Soliman Cruz, Yñigo Delen, Joyce Javier, Mia Aquino	
N O V E M B E R	4	Kara Krus	Viva Films / Vivamax / Five 2 Seven Entertainment Production	GB Sampedro (director); Denise Esteban, Adrian Alandy	
N O V E M B E R	9	Livescream	Viva Films / Vivamax + / Powerhouse Media Capital / The IdeaFirst Company	Perci Intalan (director); Elijah Canlas, Phoebe Walker	
N O V E M B E R	9	Security Academy	Angel Films Foundation, Inc.	Karlo Montero (director); Jeric Raval, Mutya Johanna Datul	
N O V E M B E R	11	Showroom	Viva Films / Vivamax / 3:16 Media Network	Carlo Obispo (director); Quinn Carillo, Rob Guinto, AJ Oteyza	
N O V E M B E R	16	Mahal Kita, Beksman	Viva Films / The IdeaFirst Company / Powerhouse MC	Perci Intalan (director); Christian Bables, Keempee de Leon, Iana Bernardez	
N O V E M B E R	17	12 Weeks	QCinema	Maria Isabelle Matutina (director); Max Eigenmann, Bing Pimentel, Vance Larena	
N O V E M B E R	17	Elehiya	QCinema	Loy Arcenas (director); Cherie Gil	
N O V E M B E R	18	Alapaap	Viva Films / Vivamax / Center Stage Productions	Freidric Macapagal Cortez (director); Josef Elizalde, Angela Morena, Andrea Garcia, Chesca Paredes, Ali Asistio, Richard Solano, Ali Khatibi, Luke Selby	
N O V E M B E R	23	An Inconvenient Love	Star Cinema	Petersen Vargas (director); Donny Pangilinan, Belle Mariano	
N O V E M B E R	25	Us X Her	Viva Films / Vivamax / Digital Dreams	Jules Katanyag (director); AJ Raval, Angeli Khang	
D E C E M B E R	2	Bata Pa si Sabel	Viva Films / Vivamax / Center Stage Productions	Reynold Giba (director); Micaella Raz, Angela Morena, Stephanie Raz, Aica Veloso, JC Tan, Benz Sangalang, Rash Flores, Chad Solano	
D E C E M B E R	7	Call Me Papi	Viva Films / Feast Foundation	Alvin Yapan (director); Enzo Pineda, Albie Casiño, Lharby Pilicarpio, Royce Cabrera, Aaron Concepcion	
D E C E M B E R	9	Pamasahe	Viva Films / Vivamax	Roman Perez Jr. (director); Azi Acosta	
D E C E M B E R	14	Broken Blooms	Bentria Productions	Louie Ignacio (director); Jeric Gonzales, Therese Malvar, Boobay, Lou Veloso, Mimi Juareza, Jaclyn Jose	
D E C E M B E R	15	Ultimate Oppa	Reality MM Studios / Creative Leaders Group Eight / Viva Films	Hwang In-roe (director); Bela Padilla, Kim Gun-woo, Jasper Cho	
D E C E M B E R	16	Laruan	Viva Films / Vivamax / Mesh Lab	Yam Laranas (director); Franki Russell, Kiko Estrada, Jay Manalo, Ava Mendez	
D E C E M B E R	23	An Affair to Forget	Viva Films / Vivamax / 316 Media Network	Louie Ignacio (director); Sunshine Cruz, Allen Dizon, Angelica Cervantes, Karl Aquino	
D E C E M B E R	25	Deleter	Viva Films / Pelikula Red / Top Story	Mikhail Red (director); Nadine Lustre, Louise delos Reyes, McCoy de Leon	
D E C E M B E R	25	Family Matters	Cineko Film Productions / Top Story	Nuel C. Naval (director); Noel Trinidad, Liza Lorena, Agot Isidro, Mylene Dizon, Nonie Buencamino, JC Santos, Nikki Valdez	
D E C E M B E R	25	Labyu with an Accent	Star Cinema / CCM Film Productions	Rodel Nacianceno (director); Coco Martin, Jodi Sta. Maria	
D E C E M B E R	25	Mamasapano: Now It Can Be Told	Borracho Film Production	Lester Dimaranan (director); Edu Manzano, Aljur Abrenica, Paolo Gumabao, Allan Paule, Claudine Barretto	
D E C E M B E R	25	My Father, Myself	3:16 Media Network	Joel Lamangan (director); Jake Cuenca, Dimples Romana, Sean de Guzman	
D E C E M B E R	25	My Teacher	TEN17P, APT Entertainment, DepEd Entertainment	Paul Soriano (director); Joey de Leon, Toni Gonzaga, Ronnie Alonte, Loisa Andalio	
D E C E M B E R	25	Nanahimik ang Gabi	Rein Entertainment Philippines Dreamscape Entertainment	Shugo Praico (director); Ian Veneracion, Mon Confiado, Heaven Peralejo	
D E C E M B E R	25	Partners in Crime	Star Cinema / Viva Films	Cathy Garcia-Molina (director); Vice Ganda, Ivana Alawi	
D E C E M B E R	30	Bugso	Viva Films / Vivamax / 316 Media Network	Adolfo Alix Jr. (director); Ayanna Misola, Sid Lucero, Hershie de Leon	

Color key

- – a QCinema International Film Festival entry film
- – a Metro Manila Film Festival entry film
