= Virgin Forest =

Virgin Forest may refer to:

- Old-growth forest
- Virgin Forest (1985 film), a Filipino war drama film
- Virgin Forest (2022 film), a Filipino erotic film
- Virgin Forest (album), a 2006 album by Lionel Loueke
