= Mahjong Nights =

Philippine drama film

- Directed by: Lawrence Fajardo
- Screenplay by: Ron Bryant; Lawrence Fajardo
- Story by: Ron Bryant
- Produced by: Krisma Fajardo
- Starring: Angeli Khang; Sean de Guzman; Mickey Ferriols; Jay Manalo
- Cinematography: T.M. Malones
- Edited by: Lawrence Fajardo
- Music by: Peter Legaste
- Production company: Viva Films
- Distributed by: Viva Films (Vivamax)
- Release date: November 12, 2021
- Running time: 111 minutes
- Country: Philippines
- Language: Filipino

Mahjong Nights is a 2021 Philippine drama film co-written, edited and directed by Lawrence Fajardo. The film stars Angeli Khang, Sean de Guzman, Mickey Ferriols and Jay Manalo.

== Plot ==
Esther (Mickey) regularly organizes a Mahjong game night with her friends at her house, where she lives with her second husband Leo (Jay) and her only daughter Alexa (Angeli). One night, dark secrets are revealed, including Alexa's illicit affair with Leo.

== Cast ==
- Angeli Khang as Alexa
- Sean de Guzman as Gaspar
- Mickey Ferriols as Esther
- Jay Manalo as Leo
- Arnel Ignacio as Wylo
- Jamilla Obispo as Amparo
- Liz Alindogan as Ason
- Jonathan Tadioan as Big Boy
- Oakley as Himself
