= Taya (2021 film) =

2021 Filipino film by Roman Perez, Jr

- Title card
- Directed by: Roman Perez, Jr
- Starring: AJ Raval; Sean De Guzman; Jela Cuenca; Angeli Khang
- Production company: Viva Films
- Distributed by: Vivamax
- Release date: August 27, 2021
- Running time: 103 minutes
- Country: Philippines
- Language: Filipino

Taya is a 2021 Philippine erotic action thriller film released on August 27, 2021, on Vivamax. Produced by Viva Films, it is the first installment film by Roman Perez, Jr and is followed by Balik Taya that released in 2023. The film features AJ Raval and Sean De Guzman along with several cast members; Angeli Khang and Jela Cuenca. Mario Bautista for journalnews.com.ph reviewed the film.

== Plot ==
Sixto explores the dangerous world of online ending for his thesis and gets involved with Winona, Nieves and Nanette.

== Cast ==
- Sean De Guzman as Sixto
- AJ Raval as Nanette
- Jela Cuenca as Winona
- Angeli Khang as Nieves
- Pio Balbuena as Lepot
- Raul Morit as Abner
- Mon Confiado as Mr. Agulto
- Soliman Cruz as Boss Baps

== Production ==
The film was announced by Viva Films. It was initially titled Pataya Patihaya. Sean De Guzman, AJ Raval, Jela Cuenca and Angeli Khang was cast to appear in the film. The principal photography of the film started in 2021. The press conference for the film was held on July 29, 2021. The teaser of the film was released on July 30, 2021.
