= Balik Taya =

2023 Filipino film by Roman Perez, Jr

- Theatrical release poster
- Directed by: Roman Perez, Jr
- Starring: Angeli Khang; Jela Cuenca; Azi Acosta; Kiko Estrada
- Production company: Viva Films
- Distributed by: Viva Films
- Release date: 31 March 2023
- Running time: 96 minutes
- Country: Philippines
- Language: Filipino

Balik Taya is a 2023 Philippine action thriller film released on March 31, 2023, on Vivamax. Produced and distributed by Viva Films, it is the second installment film by Roman Perez, Jr after Taya that was released in 2021. The film features Angeli Khang and Jela Cuenca along with several cast members; Azi Acosta, Kiko Estrada, Chesca Paredes, Amor Lapus, Aiko Garcia, Benz Sanggalang, Nor Domingo, Gilleth Sandico and Lou Veloso. Mario Bautista for journalnews.com.ph reviewed the film.

== Plot ==
In the popular Vivamax production "Taya," featuring Angeli Khang, Kiko Estrada, Jela Cuenca, and Azi Acosta, the story unfolds as Pip encounters Jessy during his time in Thailand. However, when Jessy goes missing, Pip embarks on a search to locate her. Along the way, he crosses paths with Kate, a woman associated with a gambling site operated by Nina. This encounter brings Pip one step closer to finding Jessy.

== Cast ==
- Angeli Khang as Kate
- Jela Cuenca as Nina
- Azi Acosta as Jessy
- Kiko Estrada as Pip
- Chesca Paredes as Bar Sexy Girl
- Amor Lapus as Online Girl 1 a.k.a. Round Girl
- Aiko Garcia as Online Girl 2
- Benz Sanggalang as Anjo
- Nor Domingo as Pablito
- Gilleth Sandico
- Lou Veloso as Tito Gani
- Alexa Ocampo

== Production ==
The film was announced by Viva Films. Khang and Cuenca was cast to appear in new roles. The principal photography of the film started in 2022 in Thailand.
