= Eyes on Fire (film) =

2022 erotic drama film by McArthur C. Alejandre

- Directed by: McArthur C. Alejandre
- Written by: Ricky Lee
- Produced by: Vincent del Rosario III; Veronique del Rosario-Corpus
- Starring: Angeli Khang; Paolo Gumabao; Sid Lucero; Jela Cuenca
- Cinematography: Daniel "Toto" Uy
- Edited by: Benjo Ferrer
- Music by: Von de Guzman
- Production company: Viva Films
- Distributed by: Vivamax
- Release date: January 28, 2022
- Running time: 105 minutes
- Country: Philippines
- Language: Filipino

Eyes on Fire (Filipino: Silip sa Apoy, lit. 'Peek at the Fire') is a 2022 Philippine erotic drama film directed by McArthur C. Alejandre from a screenplay written by Ricky Lee. Starring Angeli Khang, Paolo Gumabao, Sid Lucero, and Jela Cuenca, the story follows a woman who is regularly abused by her alcoholic husband and seeks to escape with her new neighbor and lover.

Produced and distributed by Viva Films, the film was released digitally on January 28, 2022, via Vivamax.

== Cast ==
- Angeli Khang as Emma
- Paolo Gumabao as Alfred
- Sid Lucero as Ben
- Jela Cuenca as Dina
- Dexter Doria as Carmelita
- Massimo Scofield as OFW
- John Drey Guevarra as customer
- Juvz Tesalona as Marites

== Production ==
Eyes on Fire was shot in Pampanga in December 2021, with strict precautions taken to avoid COVID-19 infections from occurring on set.

== Release ==
Eyes on Fire was released on Vivamax on January 28, 2022. Before its release, the film's trailer was posted on YouTube on January 7, while an online conference for the film was held on January 19. During the conference, actress Angeli Khang revealed that she was physically abused by her Korean father during childhood.

In its first few days on the Vivamax platform, Eyes on Fire received more than 250,000 views, which broke a record previously held by the film Hugas according to the site.

Later in October, the film was screened at the 4th Wallachia International Film Festival in Romania, where it won the Best Director award for McArthur C. Alejandre.
