= Bela Luna =

2023 Filipino film by Mac Alejandre

- Theatrical release poster
- Directed by: Mac Alejandre
- Written by: Ricky Lee
- Produced by: Valerie S. Del Rosario; Vincent Del Rosario III
- Starring: Angeli Khang; Mark Anthony Fernandez; Kiko Estrada
- Cinematography: Daniel Uy
- Edited by: Benjo Ferrer; Celina Marie Donato
- Music by: Von De Guzman
- Production company: Viva Films
- Distributed by: Vivamax
- Release date: January 27, 2023
- Running time: 109 minutes
- Country: Philippines
- Language: Filipino

Bela Luna is a 2023 Philippine romantic drama film written by Ricky Lee and directed by Mac Alejandre. It is produced and distributed by Viva Films and stars Angeli Khang, Mark Anthony Fernandez, and Kiko Estrada. The film premiered on January 27, 2023, on Vivamax.

== Cast ==
- Angeli Khang as Bela/Luna
- Mark Anthony Fernandez as Diego
- Kiko Estrada as Arnold
- Julio Diaz as Abe
- Francis Mata as Mr. Dizon
- Nicco Manalo as Gardy

== Production ==
The film was announced by Viva Films. Angeli Khang, Mark Anthony Fernandez, Kiko Estrada, Millen Gal, Julio Diaz and Nicco Manalo was cast to appear in the film. The principal photography of the film commenced in 2022. The teaser and trailer for the film were released on January 4 and January 11, 2023, respectively.
