= Patikim-Tikim =

2023 Filipino film by Jose Javier Reyes

- Theatrical release poster
- Directed by: Jose Javier Reyes
- Starring: Yen Durano; Apple Dy; Chloe Jenna; Aerol Carmelo; Jaggy Lejano; Joey Reyes; Enzo Santiago
- Production company: Viva Films
- Distributed by: Vivamax
- Release date: September 14, 2023
- Running time: 92 minutes
- Country: Philippines
- Language: Filipino

Patikim-Tikim is a 2023 Philippine romance sex comedy film produced and distributed by Viva Films. It features Yen Durano, Apple Dy, Chloe Jenna, Aerol Carmelo, Jaggy Lejano, Joey Reyes, and Enzo Santiago. The film premiered on September 14, 2023, on Vivamax.

== Cast ==
- Yen Durano
- Apple Dy
- Chloe Jenna
- Aerol Carmelo
- Jaggy lejano
- Joey Reyes
- Enzo Santiago

== Reception ==
A positive review mentions the film self-reflexive dimension "The film has meta moments, as when Joey faces the camera and says: “The prostitute!” But he is even more uproariously funny when he delivers the movie’s very last line."
