= Angeli Khang =

Filipino actress (born 2001)

- Born: Agnes Khang; August 3, 2001 (age 25); Mandaluyong, Philippines
- Occupation: Actress
- Years active: 2021–present
- Agent: Viva Artists Agency (2021–present)

Agnes "Angeli" Khang (born August 3, 2001) is a Filipino actress. Dubbed as "Vivamax Queen", she is known for her performances in various VMX films such as Mahjong Nights (2021), Silip sa Apoy (2022), and Unang Tikim (2024).

== Early life and career ==
Khang was born on August 3, 2001, to a Filipino mother and a South Korean father. She began as a cosplayer and model before entering showbiz. She was discovered by manager Jojo Veloso before eventually signing to Viva Artists Agency.

In an interview with Boy Abunda, she revealed that she experienced physical abuse from her father who is a Korean army general stationed in the United States. Upon discovery of the abuse, her mother took legal action against her father which resulted in a standing warrant for his arrest. Despite this, Khang expressed willingness to forgive her father.

In a March 2025 interview, Khang mentioned that she's getting to know a suitor who is not from the entertainment industry and says that he's aware of her acting work.

After months on hiatus, Khang made a comeback in June 2026 through a live show dubbed as All In: An Angeli Khang Exclusive.

== Filmography ==
=== Television series ===
| Year | Title | Role | Ref |
|---|---|---|---|
| 2022 | Wag Mong Agawin Ang Akin | Jasmine | |
| 2024 | Black Rider | Nimfa | |
| 2025 | FPJ's Batang Quiapo | Veronica Kwon | |

=== Film ===
| Year | Title | Role |
|---|---|---|
| 2021 | Taya | Nieves |
| 2021 | Mahjong Nights | Alexa |
| 2021 | Eva | Eva |
| 2022 | Silip sa Apoy | Emma |
| 2022 | Pusoy | Mika |
| 2022 | Virgin Forest | Angela |
| 2022 | Girl Friday | Amor |
| 2022 | Selina's Gold | Selina |
| 2022 | Us x Her | Lila |
| 2023 | Bela Luna | Bela / Luna |
| 2023 | Balik Taya | Kate |
| 2023 | Tayuan | Ella |
| 2023 | Sila ay Akin | Josie |
| 2023 | Salakab | Lena |
| 2023 | Ganti-ganti | Bella |
| 2024 | Salawahan | Melanie |
| 2024 | Unang Tikim | Yuna |
| 2024 | Uhaw | Astrid |
| 2024 | Boy Kaldag | Teacher Paloma |
| 2025 | Mandirigma | |
