= Virgin Forest (2022 film) =

2022 Filipino film by Brillante Mendoza

- Theatrical release poster
- Directed by: Brillante Mendoza
- Written by: Brillante Mendoza
- Screenplay by: Reynold Giba
- Starring: Sid Lucero; Angeli Khang; Vince Rillon; Rob Guinto; Kat Dovey
- Cinematography: Rap Ramirez
- Edited by: Peter Arian Vito
- Production company: Viva Films
- Distributed by: Viva Films
- Release date: 24 June 2022
- Running time: 113 minutes
- Country: Philippines
- Language: Filipino

Virgin Forest is a 2022 Filipino erotic film directed by Brillante Mendoza. Produced and distributed by Viva Films, the film features Sid Lucero and Angeli Khang along with several cast members; Vince Rillon, Rob Guinto and Kat Dovey. It released on June 24, 2022, on Vivamax.

== Cast ==
- Sid Lucero as Francis
- Angeli Khang as Angela
- Vince Rillon as Roger
- Katrina Dovey as Karla
- Rob Guinto as Gina
- Alma Moreno as Minda
- Alan Paule as Mang Canor
- Micaella Raz as Lead Diwata
- Aica Veloso as Diwata 1
- Aivy Rodriguez as Diwata 2
- Allison Smith as Diwata 3
- Joan Callesa aa Diwata 4
- Steph Deñoso as Diwata 5
- Jessa Mae Conson as Diwata 6
- Markki Stroem as John
- Ivan Padilla as Eric
- Greg Hawkins as Greg
- Erlinda Villalobos as Angela's grandmother
- Jao Mapa as Albert
- Julio Diaz as Mayor

== Production ==
The film was announced by Viva Films. Sid Lucero and Angeli Khang were cast to appear in the film. The principal photography of the film commenced in 2022 in Batangas, Bukidnon and Quezon (province). The teaser of the film was released on May 30, 2022.
