= Jay Manalo =

Filipino actor and model

- Born: Jay Lan Manalo; January 30, 1973 (age 53); Saigon, South Vietnam (now Ho Chi Minh City, Vietnam)
- Occupations: Actor; model
- Hometown: Tondo, Manila, Philippines
- Years active: 1994–present
- Agents: Sparkle; Viva Artists Agency; Regal Entertainment

Jay Lan Manalo (January 30, 1973) is a Filipino-Vietnamese actor and model.

== Early life and background ==
Jay Manalo was born on January 30, 1973, in Vietnam but was raised in Tondo, Manila, Philippines. He was born to Eustaquio Manalo and a Vietnamese mother.

== Acting career ==
After he won as 1st runner-up of SM Man of the Year he became a model/endorser of Blowing Bubbles.

His film debut was through the action movie Brat Pack in 1994. He became a lead in his second film, Paracale Gang, which was released in 1996 and followed by the movie Urban Rangers. That same year, he did a switch from action to sexy roles when he starred in the movie Gayuma opposite Amanda Page. Possessing boyish looks and an oozing sex appeal, he became a staple of sexy movies in the Philippines, with the film Totoy Mola pushing him to sexy stardom.

After Totoy Mola, he played lead in "bold flicks" like Kool Ka Lang, Kaliwat Kanan, Sakit sa Katawan, Bayad Puri, Bawal na Halik and Balahibong Pusa. By the turn of the century, his roles had become more serious and dramatic. His recent performances have been well received by movie critics, and he has won a number of acting awards in the Philippines. Some of his noticeable portrayals are in the films Prosti, Bayarán, Ang Huling Birhen sa Lupa, Hubog, Aishite Imasu 1941: Mahal Kita and Mano Po 3: My Love. He ventured into other film genres, having starred recently in comedies such as I Will Survive and Ako Legal Wife and in fantasy / horror films such as Gagamboy, Feng Shui, and his latest film Barang.

He voiced Simakwel in Urduja who was the titular character's fiancé. The film also stars Regine Velasquez, Cesar Montano, Eddie Garcia and Johnny Delgado.

His latest movie role was in 2011's Shake, Rattle & Roll 13 as Mar in the episode, Rain Rain Go Away.

He is also known for his role as Tiago in a Vivamax movie, Selina's Gold, and his famous quote, “Bawasan mo ang pagsasalsal, para may oras ka sa gawain!!”.

Manalo has been part of the cast of soap operas. His TV career started with the top-rated soap in 1997, Mula sa Puso, (ABS-CBN) which starred Claudine Barretto. He followed it up with other appearances in soaps like Pangako Sa 'Yo (ABS-CBN) and Kung Mawawala Ka (GMA Network).

His breakthrough role in television is his portrayal in the soap opera, Vietnam Rose in ABS-CBN in 2005. He plays Miguel, a Vietnamese businessman who was Carina's (played by Maricel Soriano) first love. Though the performances of the cast were well-cited by critics, the ratings were disappointing. After Vietnam Rose, he was included in the cast of GMA's TV adaptation of Bakekang. He played Christoph, an actor and a love interest of the lead role, Bakekang, played by Sunshine Dizon and Valeria, played by Sheryl Cruz. Bakekang became one of the top-rated shows in the Philippines. He recently starred in his new action-adventure series on GMA titled Zaido: Pulis Pangkalawakan as Drigo, a Filipino version of Hessler of Shaider.

In the 2025 GMA Network action-drama series Mga Batang Riles, Manalo plays Rendon Victor, the patriarch of the influential and powerful Victor family.

== Personal life ==
Jay's father was Eustaquio Manalo a musician and his mother is Vietnamese. They moved to Thailand when he was three and eventually moved to Manila. By the time he was five, his parents had separated. His mother was forced to leave him.

He has a younger half-brother, Julius Manalo, who was born to Eustaquio and a Korean mother. Julius currently works as a policeman.

Despite being married, Manalo has admitted that he has twelve children with six different women.

=== Bomb joke ===
Manalo was briefly detained in July 2007 for making a bomb joke at Ninoy Aquino International Airport on his way to take a flight to Puerto Princesa, Palawan.

== Filmography ==
Key
†	Denotes films or TV productions that have not yet been released

=== Film ===
Year	Title	Role	Ref.
1994	Brat Pack		
1995	Urban Rangers	Chito	
1996	Totoy Golem	Nicasio "Asiong" Salonga	
1996	Paracale Gang		
1996	Gayuma		
1997	Totoy Mola	Totoy Mola	
1997	Magkapalad		
1997	Maalaala Mo Kaya	Roger	
1997	Kool Ka Lang		
1997	Kaliwa't Kanan, Sakit sa Katawan	Ruben	
1997	Habang Nasasaktan Lalong Tumatapang		
1997	Magkapalad	(Released: 26 November 1997)	
1997	Gloria, Gloria Labandera		
1998	Sabong	(Released: 25 March 1998)	
1998	Wangbu	(Released: 22 April 1998) (Produced and Directed by: Toto Natividad)	
1998	Bayad Puri	(Released: 9 September 1998)	
1998	Ginto't Pilak	(Released: 18 November 1998)	
1999	Bullet	Ferdie	
2000	Abandonada		
2001	Balahibong Pusa		
2001	Hubog	Uno: nominated for Best Actor in the Metro Manila Film Festival Awards	
2002	Bayarán	won for Best Actor in the FAMAS Awards	
2002	Kapalit		
2002	Prosti	Nonoy: won Best Actor in the Urian Awards	
2002	Masikip, Mainit... Paraisong Parisukat	Al	
2002	Mano Po	Emerson Lau: nominated for Best Supporting Actor in the Metro Manila Film Festival Awards; nominated for Best Supporting Actor in the Urian Awards	
2003	Sssshhh... She Walks by the Night		
2003	Ang Huling Birhen sa Lupa	Fr. Emman: won for Best Actor in the Manila Film Festival Awards; nominated for Best Actor in the Star Awards for Movies	
2003	Mano Po 2	Johnson Lim	
2004	Gagamboy	Ipisman	
2004	U-belt		
2004	I Will Survive	Greg	
2004	Singles	Anton	
2004	Feng Shui	Inton	
2004	Mano Po III: My Love	Paul Yang: nominated for Best Actor in the Metro Manila Film Festival Awards	
2004	Aishite Imasu 1941: Mahal Kita	Ichiru: nominated for Best Supporting Actor in the Metro Manila Film Festival Awards; won for Best Supporting Actor in the Film Academy of the Philippines Awards	
2005	Mano Po 4: Ako Legal Wife	Elton Chong: nominated for Best Actor in the Metro Manila Film Festival Awards	
2006	Pacquiao: The Movie	Emong	
2006	Barang	Elmo	
2008	Urduja	Simakwel (voice)	
2008	Paupahan		
2009	Manila	Tristan	
2010	Romeo at Juliet		
2011	Shake, Rattle & Roll 13	Mar	
2011	Manila Kingpin: The Asiong Salonga Story	Prison Mayor Guardame	
2013	Seduction	Ervin	
2017	Higanti	Congressman Alex	
2017	Pusit		
2017	Ang Panday		
2018	Watch Me Kill	Franco	
2019	Anak ti karayan	Capt. Eleazar	
2019	Love is Love	Calvin	
2021	Anak ng Macho Dancer	Jun Mallari	
2021	Mahjong Nights	Leo	
2022	Girl Friday	Congressman Fredie Ibasco	
2022	Selina's Gold	Tiago	
2022	Laruan	Rene	
2023	Beloved	Leo	
2023	Hosto	Daniel	
2023	Bugaw	Ser	
2024	Bad Boy 3: Bagani		

=== Television ===
Year	Title	Role	Ref.
1997–1999	Mula sa Puso	Gilbert Matias	
2000–2002	Pangako Sa 'Yo	Caloy Macaspac	
2002–2003	Kung Mawawala Ka	Nestor Adorable	
2005	Saang Sulok ng Langit	Dante	
2005–2006	Vietnam Rose	Lê Đình Hiền Hoàng / Miguel	
2006–2007	Carlo J. Caparas's Bakekang	Kristof Arevalo	
2007–2008	Zaido: Pulis Pangkalawakan	Commander Drigo	
2009	All My Life	Gary Romualdez	
2009	Sineserye Presents: Florinda	Ramil Gonzales	
2010	May Bukas Pa: Father	Franco de Jesus	
2010	The Last Prince	Carlos Ledesma	
2011	Babaeng Hampaslupa	Charles Wong	
2011	Ang Utol Kong Hoodlum	Salazar	
2011	Glamorosa	Dr. Arman Gallano	
2012	Isang Dakot na Luha	Mario San Diego	
2013	Kidlat	Mario Palomares / Burak	
2013–2014	Madam Chairman	Armando "Dodong" de Guzman	
2014	Niño	Lucio	
2014	Strawberry Lane	Christopher "Chris" Bernarte	
2015	Healing Hearts	Abel Villamor	
2015	FPJ's Ang Probinsyano	Victor Mangubat	
2015–2016	And I Love You So	Dominador "Dexter" Eustaquio Jimenez	
2016	Danny Zialcita's Bakit Manipis ang Ulap?	Ricardo's brother	
2016	Magpakailanman: My Little Wife: The Teddy and Lorna Francisco Love Story	Adult Teddy	
2016	Maalala Mo Kaya: Pasa	Rudy	
2016	Conan, My Beautician	Conrado	
2016	Maalala Mo Kaya: Gitara	Jackson "Jack" Rudio	
2016–2017	Till I Met You	Robert Ernesto Galang	
2017	Meant to Be	Melchor Dela Cruz	
2017	Alyas Robin Hood	Pablo Rodrigo	
2018	Magpakailanman: Ang Munti Kong Pangarap: The Kyline Alcantara Story	Butch Alcantara	
2018	The Cure	General Fernan / Supremo	
2018	Magpakailanman: May Forever si Lola: The Renato Payos and Eloisa Gonzales Love Story	Renato "Rene" Payos	
2019	Sino ang May Sala?: Mea Culpa	Lucio Del Rio	
2019	Magpakailanman: Baklash: The Viral Prinsesitas of Navotas	Jimmy Vileganio	
2020–2021	Anak ni Waray vs. Anak ni Biday	Joaquin Escoto	
2022	Wish Ko Lang: Kumpare	Greco	
2022	Tadhana: Batangueno Lover	Banjo	
2024–2025	Walang Matigas na Pulis sa Matinik na Misis	Pancho Blanco (season 2 & 3)	
2025	Mga Batang Riles	Rendon Victor	
2025–2026	Sing Galing: SINGlebrity Edition	Himself / Contestant	
