= VMX (streaming service) =

Philippine video streaming service

- Former name: Vivamax (2021–2024)
- Website type: OTT streaming platform
- Available in: Filipino, English
- Headquarters: Pasig City, Philippines
- Country of origin: Philippines
- Owner: Viva Communications, Inc.
- Key people: Vic del Rosario Jr. (chairman and CEO); Vincent del Rosario (president and COO)
- Industry: Entertainment
- Products: Streaming media; video on demand; digital distribution
- Services: Film production; film distribution; Pornographic themes; television production; television distribution
- Website: vivamax.net
- Advertising: Yes
- Registration: Monthly/yearly subscription required to access content
- Users: ▲17 million (as of May 2025)
- Launched: January 29, 2021; 5 years ago (as Vivamax); October 10, 2024; 2 years ago (as VMX)
- Current status: Active

VMX is a Philippine subscription video-on-demand, over-the-top streaming service owned and operated by Viva Communications. It features original Filipino films and series, as well as various acquired content. The service also distributes television series and films produced by Viva. Launched as Vivamax in 2021, it was rebranded as VMX in October 2024. It is one of the largest online streaming services in the Philippines.

== History ==
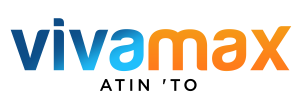
First logo, until October 2024

Prior to 2020, Viva Communications chairman and CEO Vic del Rosario was developing a streaming platform envisioned to become the country's largest Filipino content service, coinciding with Viva's 39th anniversary in November 2020. Del Rosario announced that Viva would produce its own digital content, allocating at least ₱6 billion over five years, with the aim of releasing new content weekly.

Although conceptualised before the COVID-19 pandemic, the outbreak and the subsequent closure of cinemas accelerated the project's development. With a backlog of films and uncertain theatrical release opportunities, the company shifted to digital distribution. In early 2020, Viva Films had around 17 completed films, but with cinemas closed, traditional distribution was no longer feasible. This led to the decision to create Vivamax.

Despite lacking a dedicated team for streaming operations, Viva mobilised its existing workforce to develop the platform. Del Rosario noted that while the company lacked technical expertise in streaming, it compensated with an extensive content library of more than 3,000 hours of films.

Vivamax was officially launched on January 29, 2021. It debuted with over 100 titles from Viva's film library, as well as Hollywood and Asian films dubbed in Tagalog. The platform expanded steadily with new releases and original productions. In 2021, it released 35 original films and series. Viva allocated at least ₱1 billion annually for production during the pandemic to support industry workers and provide entertainment for audiences in the Philippines and overseas. The service's first original release was Paglaki Ko, Gusto Kong Maging Pornstar (When I Grow Up, I Want to Be a Pornstar) directed by Darryl Yap.

== Content ==
VMX produces original programming under the banner VMX Originals, which primarily features risqué, edgy, and adult-themed content for mature audiences. In addition to its originals, the platform offers more than 2,000 films and television series from Viva, as well as acquired titles from local and international sources.

The platform also features content from other Philippine film production companies, including ABS-CBN Studios/Star Cinema, GMA Pictures, MQ Studios, Regal Entertainment, Unitel Pictures, Solar Pictures, APT Entertainment, OctoArts Films, Brightlight Productions, 1017P, Reality Entertainment, The IdeaFirst Company, FPJ Productions, and Brillante Mendoza's Center Stage Productions.

In January 2023, Viva launched a separate streaming service within the same application called Viva One (formerly Viva Prime), offering wholesome and family-friendly films for a broader audience. By its third year of operation, Vivamax's original titles had grown to nearly 200.

In August 2024, the film Unang Tikim (First Taste), starring Angeli Khang and Robb Guinto, became the first Vivamax original movie to be screened in cinemas. The release included both R-16 and R-18 versions to cater to different audience groups.

VMX typically releases about seven original films per month—nearly two per week, or more than 80 per year—most of which are adult-oriented productions.

=== VMX Plus ===
VMX Plus (formerly Vivamax Plus) is the transactional video-on-demand (TVOD) service of VMX. Launched in October 2021, VMX Plus offers new films through early access and special advanced screenings. It also features digitally restored classics from the Viva Films library, independent Filipino productions, exclusive titles from film festivals, and recent foreign releases. The service became available worldwide in January 2022.

== Reception ==
VMX quickly gained a reputation for its focus on softcore erotic content, as many of its original productions featured mature, adult-themed material. In its first year, the service gained over two million subscribers. By April 2022, this number had risen to three million worldwide. VMX continued to expand its subscriber base, reaching seven million subscribers by June 2023. Less than a year later, in May 2024, it surpassed 11 million subscribers, exceeding Viva's initial projections for the year.

The service also experienced notable growth in overseas markets, particularly in Indonesia, Malaysia, Singapore, Japan, India, and the United Kingdom. To cater to its Indonesian audience, VMX introduced Bahasa subtitles, with Indonesia alone accounting for at least one million subscribers.

=== Criticism ===
VMX's library of erotic content has drawn criticism from Philippine senator Jinggoy Estrada, who alleged that the streaming service allowed younger audiences easy access to "sexy content" with no redeeming value. This criticism came amid calls for the Movie and Television Review and Classification Board (MTRCB) to expand its regulatory scope to include online streaming services.

== Rebrand and other ventures ==
Vivamax was officially rebranded as VMX in October 2024, coinciding with the platform reaching 12 million subscribers. VMX has since launched several ventures beyond video streaming.

=== CineSilip Film Festival ===
CineSilip is an independent film festival launched in 2025, organized by VMX in partnership with Ayala Malls Cinemas. It aims to highlight bold, brave, and different Filipino films that explore mature, provocative, and unconventional themes.

The festival was established to provide a platform for emerging Filipino filmmakers to tell stories beyond mainstream conventions, particularly those tackling adult or controversial subject matter. It also seeks to challenge the stigma surrounding erotic or mature-themed Filipino cinema by providing institutional recognition and a legitimate space for exhibition.

=== Other ventures ===
- VMX Club – A membership-based community offering exclusive content, events, and perks for subscribers.
- Project X: VMX Fashion Show – A themed fashion event inspired by the Victoria's Secret Fashion Show, featuring VMX artists and incorporating live performances and special segments.

== Geographic availability ==
As of 2024, VMX is available in 78 countries worldwide.

Aside from the Philippines, the service is accessible in the following countries:

Continent	Countries
North America	United States, Canada, Mexico, Dominican Republic, Panama
Europe	Austria, Belgium, Cyprus, Czech Republic, Denmark, Finland, France, Germany, Greece, Hungary, Iceland, Ireland, Italy, Luxembourg, Malta, Netherlands, Norway, Poland, Portugal, Romania, Russia, Spain, Sweden, Switzerland, Turkey, United Kingdom
Africa	Algeria, Egypt, Ghana, Kenya, Morocco, Niger, South Africa, Tanzania, Tunisia
Asia	Bahrain, India, Iraq, Israel, Jordan, Kuwait, Lebanon, Oman, Qatar, Saudi Arabia, United Arab Emirates, Kazakhstan, Cambodia, Hong Kong, Indonesia, Japan, Korea, Macau, Malaysia, Maldives, Myanmar, Nepal, Pakistan, Singapore, Sri Lanka, Taiwan, Thailand, Uzbekistan, Vietnam
South America	Argentina, Brazil, Colombia, Peru, Venezuela
Oceania	Australia, New Zealand, Papua New Guinea, Micronesia

Viva has licensed a number of VMX originals for distribution in Europe to Busch Media Group GmbH & Co. KG. The agreement covers Germany, Austria, Switzerland, Luxembourg, Liechtenstein, and Alto Adige. Other licensed titles are available in Japan, South Korea, Taiwan, and Mongolia. Select originals are also accessible internationally through Amazon Prime Video and other streaming services, including Netflix, Viu, iQIYI, WeTV iflix, and ABS-CBN's iWant.
