= Alma Moreno filmography =

Filipina actress and politician

Alma Moreno is a Filipina actress and politician.

Moreno appeared in her first film in Babalik Ka Rin. Ligaw Na Bulaklak was her first starring role with Vic Silayan. Ligaw Na Bulaklak was her breakout film. From that point until the late 1980s, Moreno was featured in various uncovering films that were film industry hits, acquiring her the title "Sex Goddess of Philippine Movies" of the 1970s and 1980s. Adaptable for having featured in comedy, sexy, and drama, she also was a presenter on a few variety shows during the 1980s for which she acquired the title "Shining Star".

In the mid-2000s, Moreno partitioned her time between her expert responsibilities with GMA drama Habang Kapiling Ka and situational comedy program Da Boy en Da Girl. She offset these with her own duty to help the ladies and the poor in Parañaque City through different socio-metro and network improvement ventures. In 2002, she starred in her rebound film Kapalit.

== Filmography ==
Key
†	Denotes films that have not yet been released

=== Dramas ===
List of television drama performance
Year	Title	Role	Notes	Ref.
1976	Alindog			
1987	Loveli-ness	Host		
1990	Love Me Doods			
1998	Maalaala Mo Kaya		"Silbato" Episode	
2002	Sa Dulo ng Walang Hanggan	Mayor Socorro Bustamante		
2002	Habang Kapiling Ka	Salve Capistrano		
2002	Daboy en Da Girl	Brenda		
2005	Mga Anghel na Walang Langit	Deborah "Debra"		
2006	Komiks			
2008	Eva Fonda	Dara 'Ms. DL/Millet' Lim		
2015	Magpakailanman	Belen	"Sex Slave: Anak, pinabayaan ng ina?" Episode	
2016	Dear Uge		Guest appearance	
2016	Maalaala Mo Kaya	Imelda	"Kadena" Episode	
2016	Tsuperhero	Martha		
2017	Pusong Ligaw	Alma Morena		
2018	Sana Dalawa ang Puso	Lena Bulalayao		
2018	Asawa Ko, Karibal Ko	Sarah Corpus		
2019	Daddy's Gurl	Vaness	Guest appearance	
2021	Kagat ng Dilim	Dolor	"Taglugar" Episode	
2021	Tadhana	Aurora	"Fake Healer" Episode	
2022	Kalye Kweens	Amanda "Mandy" Tolentino-Montefalco		
2025	The Alibi	Mona		

=== Films ===
Key
†	Denotes films that have not yet been released

List of film performance
Year	Title	Role	Notes	Source
1973	Babalik Ka Rin		Moreno's first film	
1974	Urduja			
1974	Kambal Tuko			
1975	San Simeon			
1975	Kapitan Kulas			
1975	Tag-ulan sa Tag-araw			
1976	Jailbreak			
1976	Unos sa Dalampasigan			
1976	Ligaw na Bulaklak			
1976	Kung Bakit May Ulap ang Mukha ng Buwan			
1976	Daluyong at Habagat			
1976	Mrs Eva Fonda, 16			
1976	Walang Karanasan		Moreno’s first movie with Regal Films.	
1976	Ay, Manuela			
1976	Bitayin si... Baby Ama!	Minda		
1976	Bakit ako Mahihiya			
1976	Hinog sa Pilit			
1976	Markadong Anghel			
1976	Fantastika vs. Wonderwoman	Wonderwoman	Lead role	
1976	Usigin ang Maysala	Rowena		
1976	Ikaw... Ako Laban sa Mundo			
1977	Wanakosey			
1977	Huwag Mong Dungisan ang Pisngi ng Langit			
1977	Bawal na Pag-Ibig			
1977	Kapangyarihan ni Eva			
1977	Laruang Apoy			
1977	Ang Iyong Kasalanan... Rebecca Marasigan	Rebecca Marasigan	Lead role	
1977	Mga Bulaklak ng Teatro Manila			
1977	Ito Kaya'y Pagkakasala			
1977	Masikip Maliwang Paraisong Parisukat			
1977	Si Amihan at si Hagibis			
1977	Mga Hayop sa Damo			
1977	Namangka sa Dalawang Ilog			
1977	Mga Sariwang Bulaklak			
1977	Phandora			
1977	Sugar Daddy			
1977	Mga Bilanggong Birhen	Celina		
1977	Anong Uring Hayop Kami Dito sa Daigdig			
1978	Ex-Convict			
1978	Lagi na Lamang Ba Akong Babae	Ninay		
1978	Dyesebel	Dyesebel	Lead role	
1978	King			
1978	Balatkayo	Diana		
1978	Sapagkat Kami'y Tao Lamang Part 2			
1978	Huwag Hamakin! Hostess	Alice		
1978	Mga Mata ni Angelita			
1978	Bomba Star	Estilia or Stella Amor		
1978	ABC ng Pag-Ibig			
1978	Pag-ibig Magkano Ka			
1978	Gisingin Mo ang Umaga	Neneng		
1978	Isang Kahig, Isang Tuka, sa Langit at Lupa			
1978	Buhay: Ako sa Itaas, Ikaw sa Ibaba			
1978	Isang Ama, Dalawang Ina			
1978	Iwasan ... Kabaret			
1978	Mga Tinik ng Babae			
1978	Hamog			
1978	Bilangguang Walang Rehas			
1979	Kasal-kasalan, Bahay-bahayan			
1979	Bedspacers			
1979	Isang Milyong at Isang Kasalanan			
1979	Magkaribal film			
1979	Si Gorio at ang Damong Ligaw			
1979	Tatlong Bulaklak			
1979	Isang Araw Isang Buhay	Lita		
1979	Mabango Ba ang Bawat Bulaklak			
1980	Basag			
1980	City After Dark	Adelina		
1980	Waikiki			
1980	Broken Home			
1980	Ano ang Ginawa ng Babae sa Ibon			
1980	Ambisyosa			
1980	Lumakad Kang Hubad... Sa Mundong Ibabaw			
1980	im Nichols Alyas Boy Kano			
1980	Gabi ng Lagim Ngayon	Lumen		
1980	Palaban	The Bar-Room Girl		
1980	Uhaw sa Kalayaan			
1980	Unang Yakap	Gina		
1980	Ako			
1980	Si Malakas si Maganda at si Mahinhin	Candy		
1980	Tambay sa Disco			
1980	Kodigo Penal: The Valderrama Case			
1980	Nympha	Nympha	Lead role	
1981	Candy			
1981	Sisang Tabak			
1981	Titser's Pet			
1981	Ambrocio Defontorum			
1981	The Betamax Story			
1981	Abigael			
1981	Bawal			
1981	Pabling			
1981	Carnival Queen			
1981	I Confess			
1981	Kamaong Asero			
1981	Nakakabaliw, Nakakaaliw			
1981	Bihagin: Bilibid Boys			
1982	Diary of Cristina Gaston	Chona		
1982	Hanggang sa Wakas			
1982	Malikot	Evelyn Villaestrella		
1982	Good Morning, Professor			
1982	Dear God			
1982	Throw Away Child			
1983	My Funny Valentine	Fe		
1983	Teng Teng de Sarapen	Carmen		
1983	Bundok ng Susong Dalaga			
1984	Nang Maghalo ang Balat sa Tinalupan	Michelle		
1985	The Crazy Professor	Kristie		
1985	Riot 1950			
1985	Hello Lover, Goodbye Friend			
1985	Kay Dali ng Kahapon, ang Bagal ng Bukas			
1986	Beloy Montemayor			
1986	Balimbing	Amalia		
1987	Stolen Moments	Carol		
1987	Bata-batuta			
1987	Wanted Bata-batuta			
1989	Target... Police General (Maj. Gen. Alfredo S. Lim Story)	Amy		
1989	Abandonada	Celine		
1990	Lover's Delight			
1990	Kahit Singko ay Di Ko Babayaran ang Buhay Mo			
1990	Urbanito Dizon: The Most Notorious Gangster in Luzon	Lilia Dizon		
1990	Twist: Ako si Ikaw, Ikaw si Ako	Teresa		
1990	Flavor of the Month			
1991	Secrets of Pura	Pura Kikinang		
1991	Magdalena S. Palacol Story	Magdalena S. Palacol		
1991	Mahal Ko ang Mister Mo'			
1992	Guwapings: The First Adventure			
1992	Aswang	Aswang		
1992	Mahal... Saan Ka Natulog Kagabi			
1992	True Confessions (Evelyn, Myrna, & Margie)	Margie	Main role	
1993	Makati Ave (Official Girls)			
1993	Guwapings Dos	Celina		
1994	Paano Na? Sa Mundo ni Janet			
1997	Hari ng Yabang			
1998	Sonny Segovia: Lumakad Ka sa Apoy			
1999	Hey Babe!	Rose		
2002	Kapalit?			
2005	Pelukang Itim: Agimat Ko Ito for Victory Again			
2008	Tiltil	Upeng		
2016	The Third Party	Juliet		
2017	Fading Paradise	Mom		
2018	Jacqueline Comes Home	Thelma Chiong	first movie produced by Viva Films outside of her home studio Regal Films.	
2019	Papa Pogi	Romeo's Mom		
2020	Boyette: Not a Girl Yet	Nanay Suzette Camacho		
2021	Paglaki Ko, Gusto Kong Maging Pornstar	Alma	second movie produced by Viva Films	
2021	The Housemaid	Ester		
2021	Pornstar 2: Pangalawang Putok	Alma		
2022	Siklo	Apo Martina		
2022	366	Tita Mandy		
2022	Virgin Forest	Minda		
2023	Salamat Daks	Maricar		
2023	Hilom			
2023	Mary Cherry Chua	Ms. Estrella		
2024	My Sassy Girl			
