= Maid in Malacañang =

2022 Filipino film by Darryl Yap

- Theatrical release poster
- Directed by: Darryl Yap
- Written by: Darryl Yap
- Produced by: Vincent del Rosario III; Veronique del Rosario-Corpus
- Starring: Cesar Montano; Cristine Reyes; Diego Loyzaga; Ella Cruz; Ruffa Gutierrez
- Cinematography: Rain Yamson II
- Edited by: Vincent L. Asis
- Music by: Ashley Aunor; Marion Aunor
- Production companies: VinCentiments; Viva Films
- Distributed by: Viva Films
- Release dates: July 29, 2022 (SM North EDSA); August 3, 2022 (Philippines)
- Running time: 114 minutes
- Country: Philippines
- Language: Filipino
- Box office: $535,387

Maid in Malacañang is a 2022 Filipino period drama film written and directed by Darryl Yap. The film is a fictional retelling of the Marcos family's last three days in Malacañang Palace before they were forced to be exiled to Hawaii during the People Power Revolution in 1986. The film stars Cesar Montano, Cristine Reyes, Diego Loyzaga, Ella Cruz and Ruffa Gutierrez as the Marcos family, alongside Karla Estrada, Elizabeth Oropesa and Beverly Salviejo.

Marketed by Viva Films as "the most controversial film of the year", Maid in Malacañang has been met with numerous controversies surrounding the film's subject matter since it was first announced, which critics assert as a potential to distort the history of the Marcos regime and the People Power Revolution. The filmmakers, however, defended their film, arguing that the film only intends to highlight the Marcoses' perspective without negating established facts. The film premiered at SM North EDSA on July 29, 2022, and was released nationwide on August 3, 2022, followed by a limited worldwide release.

Upon release, the film received a generally negative reception, with certain scenes garnering much controversy over misrepresentations or lies as well as reviews criticizing Yap's direction and screenplay, production, acting, cinematography, and pacing. The film is intended to be the first in a trilogy about the Marcos family, with a sequel, Martyr or Murderer, released on March 1, 2023.

== Plot ==
Narrative acts
Chapter 1: Rebelde
Chapter 2: Ilocos o Leyte
Chapter 3: Tigre
Chapter 4: Awit at Ahas
Chapter 5: Bunso
Chapter 6: Oyayi
Chapter 7: Palamunin
Chapter 8: Maid in Malacañang
Chapter 9: Ang Huling SONA
Chapter 10: Retaso

Imee Marcos flies back to the Philippines from Singapore at the request of her father, President Ferdinand Marcos. When Imee arrives at the Malacañang Palace, she learns that her brother Bongbong has foiled a plot to assassinate the first family. The family struggles with the betrayal of several high-ranking officials, including several palace staff, while citizens are amassing at EDSA.

A snap election is held on February 7 in which Marcos won to allay fears that he was losing control of the government, but the results are widely regarded as fraudulent by NAMFREL. The inaugurations of Corazon Aquino and Ferdinand Marcos are held concurrently, but TV and radio media halts the broadcasts for Marcos’ inauguration. Food supplies to the palace are cut-off by the rebels while the Marcos siblings are trying to convince their parents to leave. Both parents are hesitant to leave, so Irene pleads with her father through Imee, while Bongbong assures his mother that someday they will come back.

The Marcoses gathers together with all of the palace staff, and Ferdinand bids a final farewell. Imee orders the staff to put on yellow bands made from the cutouts of her mother’s gowns in order to save them from an angry mob. As the Marcoses leave, people storm the palace, looting and destroying the premises.

The Marcos family wants to go to Ilocos Norte, but incoming President Aquino demands that the family leave the Philippines, leading to their exile in Hawaii. The final scene shows the real-life palace staff, including the Presidential Security Command, as well as the three maids, as a tribute to those who served during the Marcos family.

== Cast ==
- Cesar Montano as Ferdinand Marcos: The 10th President of the Philippines.
- Cristine Reyes as Imee Marcos: The eldest daughter of Ferdinand and Imelda Marcos, and the titular "maid" of Malacañang Palace.
- Diego Loyzaga as Bongbong Marcos: The second child and only son of Ferdinand and Imelda Marcos.
- Ella Cruz as Irene Marcos: The third child of Ferdinand and Imelda Marcos.
- Ruffa Gutierrez as Imelda Marcos: The wife of Ferdinand Marcos; First Lady of the Philippines.
- Lana Puda as Aimee Marcos: The adopted daughter of Ferdinand and Imelda Marcos.
- Giselle Sanchez as Corazon Aquino, the future President of the Philippines, figurehead of the People Power Revolution and widow of assassinated senator, Sen. Benigno Aquino Jr.
- Beverly Salviejo as Felina "Biday" Consulta; one of the maids in Malacañang Palace and still alive today as of May 2023.
- Elizabeth Oropesa as Lucy Rabino; one of the maids in Malacañang Palace, fled with the Marcoses and died in Hawaii in March 2022.
- Karla Estrada as Crisanta "Santa" Tiles; one of the maids in Malacañang Palace and died two weeks after the Marcoses left the Philippines
- Kiko Estrada as Tommy Manotoc
- Kyle Velino as Greggy Araneta
- Robin Padilla as a loyalist soldier

== Release ==
Maid in Malacañang held its premiere at SM North EDSA in Quezon City on July 29, 2022. The film was released under Viva Films in cinemas nationwide on August 3, 2022. To combat the film's release, Vince Tañada's film Katips, a movie set during the martial law era, was intentionally released on the same day.

== Reception ==
=== Box office ===
The film earned ₱21 million on its opening day and ₱63 million three days after its release, according to Viva Films. Bulks of free tickets were given out by Francis Zamora to all government employees in San Juan, and claims that Imee Marcos was giving tickets to schools.

=== Critical reception ===
The film received a generally negative reception from critics. Writing for the Philippine Daily Inquirer, historian Ambeth Ocampo criticized the acting, especially Ella Cruz's portrayal of Irene Marcos, saying that 'her whining and mock tears will not win her a FAMAS Award and that is not tsismis [gossip]'. He also criticized Cesar Montano's acting as well, saying that his performance is 'wooden and colorless as the grainy archival footage of Marcos declaring martial law in 1972.' However, he noted that the film is a fiction, and should be treated as such. The Flame, the student publication of the University of Santo Tomas Faculty of Arts and Letters, called the film 'a bid for public sympathy', criticizing the cinematography and the use of chapters to present the film, while praising the film's humor and wit. Marion Aunor's rendition of "Nosi Balasi" was also praised, describing it as 'haunting', and 'sets a chilling atmosphere as it accompanies the audience to focus more on the one-act play of “simplicity.”'. The Philippine Star also criticized the cinematography and the use of chapters as well, arguing that it is 'quite one-sided and doesn't allow for the many characters to shine on their own'. Additionally, they also criticized the acting, its propagandistic themes, and the 'snooze-fest' pacing, noting that 'the effort just appears lazy yet expects to elicit a response.' However, they praised Ruffa Gutierrez's portrayal of Imelda Marcos, arguing that Gutierrez's performance could earn her a Best Actress award 'if award-giving bodies would only not be biased in giving awards even to a pro-Marcos film.'

Writing for Rappler, Catholic priest Joaquin Ferrer Jr. strongly criticized the film for its historical distortion and the narrative, asking if it was 'made with malice'. He particularly criticized director Darryl Yap for the inclusion of the scene showing Cory Aquino and the Carmelite nuns playing mahjong, saying that if it is just included for entertainment, then 'that is poor taste, ridiculous, and offensive.' Writing in his blog, film critic Fred Hawson reviewed both Maid in Malacañang and Katips, praising the latter while giving the former a neutral reception. He argued that the film is a 'self-serving haigography [sic] probably; an appeal for public sympathy possibly', adding that contrary to the reception online, the film 'did not feel confrontational' for the most part until the mahjong scene near the end.

Stephanie Mayo of The Daily Tribune gave a somewhat positive review. She remarks that the film is 'flawed and superficial', but it is 'surprisingly gentle', a 'straightforward, somber drama' by Yap. She also noted that the production 'is a bit rough around the edges', citing a scene where one of the maids was obviously trying to remember her line. Patricia Taculao of the Manila Standard gave the film a positive review as well, especially praising Cristine Reyes' performance, and noting that the film's ending 'is true to Yap’s reputation as a controversial director'. Columnist Antonio Contreras of The Manila Times likewise gave the film a generally positive review, and argues that the film 'is not about revising history but about humanizing the Marcoses at their most vulnerable and weakest'. However, he finds the film's stereotypical typecasting as being 'problematic', criticizing the use of maids as comic relief. Director and screenwriter Suzette Doctolero likewise gave a favorable review to the film.

== Controversies ==
=== Gossip remark ===
Actress Ella Cruz was criticized by many historians and educators on her remark during a press conference: "history is like tsismis (lit. 'gossip')."

Public historian Ambeth Ocampo became the target of online attacks following his response to the actress' remarks: “Don’t confuse history and chismis. History may have bias but it is based on fact, not opinion. Real history is about truth, not lies, not fiction”. In separate statements, Tanggol Kasaysayan and the Network in Defense of Historical Truth and Academic Freedom said they stood with Ocampo. Tanggol Kasaysayan said: “[We] stand by his critique of recent efforts to trivialize and discredit History as a discipline, and to disauthorize professional historians in their socially important work of producing veridical knowledges about our past”. The Network in Defense of Historical Truth and Academic Freedom questioned: “Is this how we treat and repay our teachers? Our historians? Subject them to vile and discriminatory, unprincipled and unjust attacks?”, “Historians like Ambeth Ocampo deserve this respect, and if a writer and scholar of Ocampo's stature is vilified like this, then what can others expect, when they stand up for truth and history?”, “We condemn these ad hominem attacks on the character of a well-regarded and highly professional historian of the Philippines”, adding that they would remain “vigilant in the defense for historical truth and integrity”. The Ateneo de Manila University also condemned attacks against Ocampo, who is one of its faculty members: “We condemn these attacks, not just because it maligns Dr. Ocampo, but because it severely undermines our battle against historical distortion and disinformation”.

=== Portrayal of Corazon Aquino ===
Fans of actress Kris Aquino debunked a scene from the trailer of the film involving her mother, the late Corazon Aquino. In the trailer, a woman in a yellow dress, whose face is not seen but can be presumed to be Cory Aquino, says on a telephone: "Get them out of the Philippines". The fan site posted an excerpt from the book People Power: An Eyewitness History, which showed that Cory was willing to give the Marcoses two more days in the country to spend in their hometown Paoay. On page 240 of the book, former Supreme Court Associate Justice Cecilia Muñoz-Palma recalled what happened during Cory Aquino's phone call with US Ambassador Stephen W. Bosworth:

"On Tuesday evening, I was with Cory in the home of her sister, Josephine Reyes. There, Cory received a phone call from US Ambassador Bosworth, telling her that Marcos was ready to leave but was asking to stay for at least two days in Paoay, his home in the North. Cory's initial reaction was: 'Poor man, let us give him two days.' But we did not agree with that idea. We thought that given the chance, Marcos may regroup his forces or extend his stay indefinitely. Cory then called Ambassador Bosworth to say that she could not grant the request. Marcos should just leave the country. When Ambassador Bosworth called her back, it was to say that Marcos had left. Cool as always, Cory turned to us after she put the phone down. She said simply: 'Marcos has left.' She said it as if it was the most ordinary thing. We all shouted jubilantly. Cory did not".

On August 1, 2022, an official of the Order of the Carmelites based in Mabolo, Cebu, who were featured in the film, reacted to the film's trailer and said "God forgive them. That's totally fake news,". Gerardo Alminaza, the bishop of the Roman Catholic Diocese of Bacolod, called for a boycott of the film due to its depiction of the Carmelites.

=== Distribution of tickets to schools ===
A Facebook post claimed that 300 pieces of free movie passes complete with a letter detailing the contents of the envelope was sent by the Federation of Filipino-Chinese Chambers of Commerce and Industry, a Chinese Filipino organization, to Xavier School, a private Catholic Chinese school, but was allegedly rejected. Yap, the director of the film, responded with the controversy by saying that the leaked tickets were for block screening organized by several groups. A Facebook page, Amor Powers, argued that the tickets, being all the same, was sourced from an unnamed single person it calls "Manggalina".

=== 18th Cinemalaya Film Festival ===
Yap was booed at the 18th Cinemalaya Philippine Independent Film Festival after his name appeared on the screen, stating that he was unable to promote his new film due to his work on Maid in Malacañang.

== Sequel ==
Maid in Malacañang is the first film of a duology centered around the Marcos family. It was followed by Martyr or Murderer which was released on March 1, 2023.

== See also ==
- Historical distortion regarding Ferdinand Marcos
- A Dangerous Life, a 1988 Australian miniseries about the People Power Revolution
