= Sakristan (web series) =

- Genre: Boys' love; Romance drama
- Created by: Darryl Yap
- Written by: Darryl Yap
- Directed by: Darryl Yap
- Starring: Clifford Pusing; Henry Villanueva
- Theme music composer: Marion Aunor
- Opening theme: "Delikado" by Marion Aunor
- Country of origin: Philippines
- Original language: Filipino
- No. of seasons: 1
- No. of episodes: 8

Production
- Cinematography: Arel Ebana
- Running time: 20 minutes
- Production companies: VinCentiments; Viva Records

Original release
- Network: YouTube
- Release: May 31 – July 19, 2020

Sakristan (transl. Sacristan or Altar Server) is a 2020 Philippine boys' love (BL) web series starring Clifford Pusing and Henry Villanueva. Written and directed by Darryl Yap, the series depicts the budding romance between two male high school students who are both members of their parish's ministry of altar servers.

The series was released on YouTube through the VinCentiments channel from May 31 to July 19, 2020. It is noted for being one of the first Filipino BL series released during the surge of the genre's popularity in the Philippines during the COVID-19 pandemic. Upon its announcement, the show faced controversy from religious groups due to its themes involving the Catholic Church.

== Plot ==
Zach (Clifford Pusing) is a student and triathlete who struggles with his academics. As punishment for a school infraction, the school board mandates him to join the ministry of altar servers, believing the discipline will steer him away from misconduct.

In the ministry, a "shepherd-sheep" mentorship system is in place, where senior servers guide the novices. Zach is assigned to Christian (Henry Villanueva), the head of the altar servers. Christian is a stark contrast to Zach; he is an academic achiever, a campus leader, and holds titles such as "Prom King" and "Mr. Nutrition Month." Despite their differences and the conservative environment of the church, the two develop a romantic relationship, navigating the conflict between their duties and their personal feelings.

== Cast ==
- Clifford Pusing as Zach, a triathlete forced to become an altar boy.
- Henry Villanueva as Christian, the head altar server and school achiever.
- Xavier Reyes as Wolf
- Darrel Rivera as Paps
- Lhance Lintag as Melch
- Juniel Eclio as Josie
- Arkail Batoon as Gabby

== Production ==
On April 13, 2020, director Darryl Yap announced he was developing a Boys' Love (BL) web series titled Sakristan. The series was produced by VinCentiments in collaboration with Viva Records. Yap stated that the series would differ from the popular Thai BL dramas of the time by being "more daring" and grounding the story in the context of the Philippines being a predominantly Catholic nation.

The series features the song "Delikado" by Marion Aunor as its official soundtrack.

== Release and reception ==
The series premiered on May 31, 2020. Upon release, the pilot episode trended on YouTube Philippines, reaching the top 5 spot.

=== Controversy ===
Prior to its release, the series drew criticism from some religious individuals and groups who found the concept of a romance between altar servers disrespectful to the Catholic Church. Critics cited Canon 2357 regarding the Church's teachings on homosexuality.

Yap addressed the backlash, stating that he did not intend to damage the image of the Church and that his scripts were based on reality. He noted that while the show is fiction, it reflects the real-life experiences of friends and acquaintances in similar situations.
