= Martyr or Murderer =

2023 Filipino film by Darryl Yap

- Theatrical release poster
- Directed by: Darryl Yap
- Written by: Darryl Yap
- Produced by: Vincent del Rosario III; Veronique del Rosario-Corpus
- Starring: Cesar Montano; Isko Moreno; Cristine Reyes; Diego Loyzaga; Ella Cruz; Ruffa Gutierrez
- Cinematography: Rain Yamson II
- Edited by: Vincent L. Asis
- Music by: Ashley Aunor; Marion Aunor
- Production companies: VinCentiments; Viva Films
- Distributed by: Viva Films
- Release dates: February 27, 2023 (SM North EDSA); March 1, 2023 (Philippines)
- Running time: 106 minutes
- Country: Philippines
- Language: Filipino
- Box office: ₱5 million

Martyr or Murderer is a 2023 Philippine period family drama film written and directed by Darryl Yap. About the Marcos family's perspective on the assassination of Ninoy Aquino, it is the second installment in Yap's film series about the Marcoses after Maid in Malacañang (2022). Produced by Vincent del Rosario III and Veronique del Rosario-Corpus, the film features Cristine Reyes, Cesar Montano, Diego Loyzaga, Ella Cruz and Ruffa Gutierrez reprising their roles, along with Isko Moreno, Marco Gumabao, Jerome Ponce, Cindy Miranda, Sachzna Laparan, Elizabeth Oropesa and Beverly Salviejo.

During the release of Maid in Malacañang in 2022, director Darryl Yap revealed in an interview that the film is the first in a trilogy produced by Viva Films that revolved around the Marcos family. Martyr or Murderer is the second film in this trilogy, and was to be followed by the film Mabuhay Aloha Mabuhay, which will revolve around the exile in Hawaii of the Marcos family after the People Power Revolution in 1986. Before the release of the trailer, the film was originally planned to be released in February 2023 in time for the anniversary of People Power Revolution, but was pushed back to March 1. The film was not as successful as its predecessor, grossing around ₱5 million worldwide.

== Plot ==
The film begins with a voice recording of Senator Imee Marcos about what really happened to her family after her father Ferdinand Marcos was removed from his post as President of the Philippines and forced to exile in Hawaii in 1986. Then it flashes back to 1954, when Ferdinand, then a congressman of Ilocos Norte, hosted a party for his fraternity Upsilon Sigma Phi. Among his fraternity brothers were Mel Mathay and The Manila Times reporter Ninoy Aquino. In a speech, Ferdinand proposed to Imelda Romualdez, who came from a prominent family in Leyte, whom he only knew for 11 days. However, Ninoy had a huge feeling towards Imelda, but Imelda rejected him. In 1989, Imee who was in Morocco was visited by her cousin Maricar, who told her about what really happened after they were exiled. Then, Imee recalled the assassination of Ninoy Aquino.

In 1983, weeks before Ninoy was assassinated, there was a festive mood in the town of Sarrat, Ilocos Norte for the wedding of Irene Marcos to Greggy Araneta. Imee recalled that her mother would often talk to Ninoy in New York City. During their conversation, Imelda told Ninoy that he should be grateful to her and Ferdinand for allowing him to go to the United States to undergo heart bypass surgery. Ninoy would recall the day Imelda rejected him many years ago.

The last time Ninoy and Ferdinand encountered was in 1968, during the golden anniversary of Upsilon Sigma Phi fraternity. There, Ferdinand lambasts Ninoy for his exposés regarding the Jabidah massacre.

On August 21, 1983, Ninoy was assassinated. Imee, furiously confronted her father regarding on his statement that the New People's Army killed Ninoy. Imee suggested that her father should expose Ninoy's connection with the communists.

Imee told Maricar that she would not be able to come back to the United States and that they have lost everything because of Corazon Aquino (the Presidential Commission on Good Government sequestered all of Marcos's properties). While wandering around Morocco, she saw her father, and followed him. She remember when they were in Hawaii, she was asked by Ferdinand to leave to prevent her from any investigation from the US government.

Imee, received a piece of paper, with a letter from a hospital in Hawaii. Upon calling to the hospital, she learned that her father is dying. Imee asked Imelda to talk to her father. She asked forgiveness for all of the mistakes she had done. Ferdinand told her that he loves her before dying.

In 2016, Imee, now Governor of Ilocos Norte, received a phone call from her younger brother, Bongbong, who is running for Vice President of the Philippines. Bongbong told Imee that his opponent, Congresswoman Leni Robredo, cheated the elections. The scene cuts to the portrait of Noynoy Aquino, Ninoy and Cory Aquino's only son, who was the sitting president that time.

The final scene shows Bongbong Marcos preparing for his inauguration as the 17th President of the Philippines, the prelude for Mabuhay, Aloha, Mabuhay.

== Cast ==
- Cesar Montano as Ferdinand Marcos: The 10th President of the Philippines.
  - Marco Gumabao as young Ferdinand Marcos
- Isko Moreno as Ninoy Aquino: A senator and leader of the opposition during martial law in 1972.
  - Jerome Ponce as young Ninoy Aquino
- Cristine Reyes as Imee Marcos: The eldest daughter of Ferdinand and Imelda Marcos.
  - Eula Valdez as older Imee Marcos
- Diego Loyzaga as Bongbong Marcos: The second child and only son of Ferdinand and Imelda Marcos.
  - Aga Muhlach as older Bongbong Marcos
- Ella Cruz as Irene Marcos: The third child of Ferdinand and Imelda Marcos.
- Ruffa Gutierrez as Imelda Marcos: The wife of Ferdinand Marcos and the First Lady of the Philippines.
  - Cindy Miranda as young Imelda Marcos
- Sachzna Laparan as young Corazon Aquino
- Franki Russell as Claudia Bermudez: Bongbong Marcos' girlfriend.
- Kyle Velino as Greggy Araneta: Irene Marcos' husband.
- Elizabeth Oropesa as Lucy Rabino
- Beverly Salviejo as Felina "Biday" Consulta
- Rose Van Ginkel as Maricar: Imee Marcos' confidant in Morocco.
- Marlon Mance as Mel Mathay: The vice governor of Metro Manila Commission from 1979 to 1986.
  - Billy Jake Cortez as young Mel Mathay

== Production ==
On October 11, 2022, Yap announced on social media that he had started writing the screenplay for Martyr or Murderer. However, Yap expressed that he will step back from his directing role for the sequels and focus on writing their screenplays. On November 7, senator Imee Marcos confirmed that the sequel for Maid in Malacañang is in the works.

=== Casting ===
Isko Moreno was cast in the role of Ninoy Aquino. Additionally, Marco Gumabao, Jerome Ponce and Cindy Miranda were announced to play the younger versions of Ferdinand Marcos, Ninoy Aquino and Imelda Marcos respectively.

== Marketing ==
The teaser of the film was released on December 22, 2022.

== See also ==
- Historical distortion regarding Ferdinand Marcos
- The Kingmaker (film)
