= Diego Loyzaga =

Filipino actor and model (born 1995)

- Born: Carlos Diego Loyzaga; May 21, 1995 (age 31); San Juan, Metro Manila, Philippines
- Occupations: Model; actor; VJ
- Years active: 2011–present
- Agents: Star Magic (2011–2018); ABS-CBN (2011–present); TV5 Network (2014; 2021–present); Viva Artists Agency (2020–present)
- Height: 1.78 m (5 ft 10 in)
- Partner: Alexis Suapengco
- Children: 1
- Parents: Cesar Montano (father); Teresa Loyzaga (mother)
- Relatives: Carlos Loyzaga (grandfather); Vicky Cuerva (grandmother); Joey Loyzaga (uncle); Chito Loyzaga (uncle); Bing Loyzaga (aunt)

Carlos Diego Loyzaga Manhilot (born May 21, 1995) is a Filipino model, actor and video jockey. He is known as one of the members of the male group Kapamilya Cuties.

== Biography ==
=== Early life ===
Loyzaga was born in San Juan, Metro Manila to actress Teresa Loyzaga and actor Cesar Montano. He has a half-brother named Joseph Dizon, from his mother's former marriage to businessman Arnold Dizon; three half-sisters Angelina Cruz, Samantha Cruz, and Francheska Cruz, from his father's second marriage to Sunshine Cruz; and half-siblings named Angela Manhilot and Christian Angelo Manhilot from his father's first wife.

He is a grandson of Filipino basketball legend Carlos Loyzaga and a nephew of actress Bing Loyzaga and of former Philippine Basketball Association (PBA) players Chito Loyzaga and Joey Loyzaga.

Loyzaga confirmed to Aiko Melendez' YouTube vlog that Sofia Andres became his TOTGA, or "the one that got away." "I made a really big mistake. I was a kid. I was 20, 21 years old," he added, adding their breakup in 2018. Sofia and boyfriend, auto racing driver, Daniel Miranda have a daughter named Zoe.

In May 2000, Loyzaga, his mother and half-brother Joseph Dizon moved to Sydney.

Barbie Imperial' breakup with Loyzaga happened in February 2022.

In her January 7, 2024 Instagram post, Suapengco accused Loyzaga of evicting them out of his house because of a new relationship with Cecile Mendoza. "So my baby daddy [Diego Loyzaga] decided to kick me out and his baby out of his house so this girl can come over," she lamented. She surprisingly revealed that he told Toni Gonzaga, of his 2018 drug rehabilitation. His mother Teresa revealed that she sent Diego to a rehabilitation center.

On May 27, 2024, Loyzaga and partner, yoga teacher, Alexis Suapengco, witnessed the baptism and Hailey Paige's first "Star Wars" themed birthday.

=== Education ===
Before moving to Sydney, he attended preschool at Marcellis School in Antipolo. After moving to Sydney, he studied at St. Aidan's Catholic School in Maroubra, Sydney and at John Forrest School in Perth.

In 2011, after moving back to the Philippines to pursue an acting career, he enrolled at O.B. Montessori Center, Inc. – Greenhills where he finished high school.

== Career ==
=== 2011–2012: Early roles and short hiatus ===
On March 8, 2011, he signed a three-year exclusive contract with ABS-CBN; he was 15 years old then. In an interview, he said that going into show business was his personal choice and had nothing to do with his parents. He became part of ABS-CBN's top-rated series Mara Clara reprising the role of Derrick Gonzales originally played by Rico Yan.

He had a number of TV guesting roles including the variety talk show Gandang Gabi, Vice!, in which he chaperoned Daniel Padilla and Neil Coleta. In September 2011, he was cast in the youth-oriented drama series Growing Up, in which he played the role of Jason, the brother of Patrick.

In 2011, he was nominated as Amazing Male Newcomer in Yahoo! Awards Philippines.

While keeping up with his studies, he held various endorsements including the clothing brand Bench labeled "Happy in Bench" with co-stars Julia Montes, Kathryn Bernardo, and Albie Casiño.

He took a break from show business to complete his secondary education in 2012.

=== 2013–present: Comeback and new opportunities ===
In May 2013, he returned onscreen when he played the role of Bruce in the episode "Box" of Maalaala Mo Kaya (MMK), Asia's longest drama anthology. His comeback acting talent received good feedback on social media describing him as being able to "converse in flawless Tagalog" unlike in his past projects in which he tended to halt in twang.

Subsequently, he starred in the fantasy-drama series Wansapanataym in the second installment of "Petra Paminta," in which he played the role of Sancho and was paired with Julia Barretto.

In July 2013, he was initially signed for a major role in the soap opera Mirabella mainly cast by Julia Barretto; however, he was later delegated to a supporting role.

In September 2014, he played a supporting role in TV5’s Wattpad Presents "Mr. Popular Meets Miss Nobody". During the presscon of Wattpad Presents, he said that he had no problems with working exclusively with TV5, explaining that an artist like him did not consider network war relevant and that his work was to portray the character well.

In January 2015, he was revealed as one of three new VJ's of MYX, who could be seen in My MYX, MYX Daily Top 10, Pinoy MYX, and Pop MYX.

Still in January 2015, he guested as the young G (God) in the hit daytime program Oh My G!. In February 2015, he joined the cast of the TV series Forevermore, which was top-billed by Enrique Gil and Liza Soberano.

On May 21, 2016, when he celebrated his 21st birthday, he played the lead role of Rommel, a schoolteacher, in the MMK episode "Pasa" ("Bruise") reaching a 30.2% nationwide rating, which was more than twice as high as the 15.0% rating garnered by the Magpakailanman (MPK) episode aired by GMA 7. A number of Facebook, Twitter, and Instagram users commented that he had given justice to the lead role even without a romantic partner and that he deserved an acting award for such a commendable performance. Among the netizens who congratulated him on Twitter was Filipino recording artist and TV host Jed Madela. There were even comments on YouTube.com saying that Filipino talk show host and actress Kris Aquino had referred to him as the "male version" of diamond star Maricel Soriano and that Filipino comedian Vice Ganda had remarked that his acting performance was often comparable to that of Glaiza de Castro or Angel Locsin.

In April 2021, Loyzaga stars in a mystery love story cinema film called "Death of a Girlfriend" directed by director, Yam Laranas. This film is based on a true story. He will portray Alonzo alongside his co-star, AJ Raval as Christine.

Loyzaga plays Ferdinand "BongBong" Marcos Jr., son of the former late president Ferdinand Marcos, in the historical fiction film Maid in Malacañang by Darryl Yap.

On May 15, 2024, the Coleen Garcia-Diego Loyzaga film "Isang Gabi" premiered in a Quezon City mall. Ricky Lee and Mac Alejandre wrote and directed the film, respectively.

== Filmography ==
=== Film ===
| Year | Title | Role | Ref. |
|---|---|---|---|
| 2012 | Hitman | Jay Fernandez | |
| 2015 | The Breakup Playlist | Joshua | |
| 2017 | Bloody Crayons | Kenly Sy | |
| 2018 | Mama's Girl | Nico Sanchez | |
| 2018 | Petmalu | Timothy Reyes | |
| 2021 | Death of a Girlfriend | Alonzo | |
| 2021 | Bekis on the Run | Andres | |
| 2021 | House Tour | Raymond Palma | |
| 2021 | More Than Blue | John Louis | |
| 2021 | Dulo | Dex | |
| 2022 | The Wife | Cris | |
| 2022 | Maid in Malacañang | Bongbong Marcos | |
| 2022 | Pabuya | Pepe | |
| 2023 | Martyr or Murderer | Bongbong Marcos | |
| 2024 | 40 | | |
| 2025 | In Between | | |

=== Television ===
| Year | Title | Role | Notes | Ref. |
|---|---|---|---|---|
| 2011 | Mara Clara | Derrick Gonzales | | |
| 2011 | Gandang Gabi, Vice! | Himself | with Daniel Padilla and Neil Coleta | |
| 2012 | Growing Up | Jason Rivero | | |
| 2013 | Maalaala Mo Kaya | Bruce | Episode: "Box" | |
| 2013 | Wansapanataym | Sancho | Episode: "Petrang Paminta" | |
| 2013–2018 2026–present | ASAP | Himself | also co-host and performer | |
| 2014 | Maalaala Mo Kaya | Joel | Episode: "Card" | |
| 2014 | Mirabella | Dave Castillo | | |
| 2014 | Wattpad Presents: Mr. Popular Meets Miss Nobody | Adrian Buenavista | | |
| 2014 | Wattpad Presents: Mr. Popular Meets Miss Nobody 2: Still in Love | Adrian Buenavista | | |
| 2015 | Pop MYX | Himself (VJ) | | |
| 2015 | Pinoy MYX | Himself (VJ) | | |
| 2015 | MYX Daily Top 10 | Himself (VJ) | | |
| 2015 | My MYX | Himself (VJ) | | |
| 2015 | Oh My G! | Young G (God) | | |
| 2015 | Forevermore | Jay Fernandez | | |
| 2015 | Maalaala Mo Kaya | Teen Teddy | Episode: "Bintana" | |
| 2015 | Pangako Sa 'Yo | David San Luis / David Powers | | |
| 2016 | Gandang Gabi, Vice! | Himself | | |
| 2016 | Maalaala Mo Kaya | Rommel N. Angara | Episode: "Pasa" | |
| 2016 | Ipaglaban Mo! | Martin | Episode: "Hardinero" | |
| 2016 | Maalaala Mo Kaya | Jerome | Episode: "Pantalan" | |
| 2017 | Maalaala Mo Kaya | Mart | Episode: "Cellphone" | |
| 2017–2018 | Pusong Ligaw | Miraculo "Potpot/Ira" Policarpio / Rafael Magbanua Cervantes | | |
| 2018 | Ipaglaban Mo! | Mikoy | Episode: "Sumpaan" | |
| 2018 | Precious Hearts Romances Presents: Los Bastardos | Joaquin S. Cardinal | | |
| 2021 | Encounter | Gino Hilario | Filipino adaptation | |
| 2025–2026 | Totoy Bato | Dwayne Perez | 2025 remake | |

== Accolades ==
Awards and Nomination
| Year | Award giving body | Category | Nominated work | Result |
|---|---|---|---|---|
| 2011 | 25th PMPC Star Awards for TV | Best New Male TV Personality | Mara Clara | Nominated |
| 2013 | 28th PMPC Star Awards for Movies | New Movie Actor of the Year | Hitman | Nominated |
| 2015 | 2015 FAMAS Awards | German Moreno Youth Achievement Award | —N/a | Won |
