= Tagalog profanity =

Profanity in the language of the Philippines

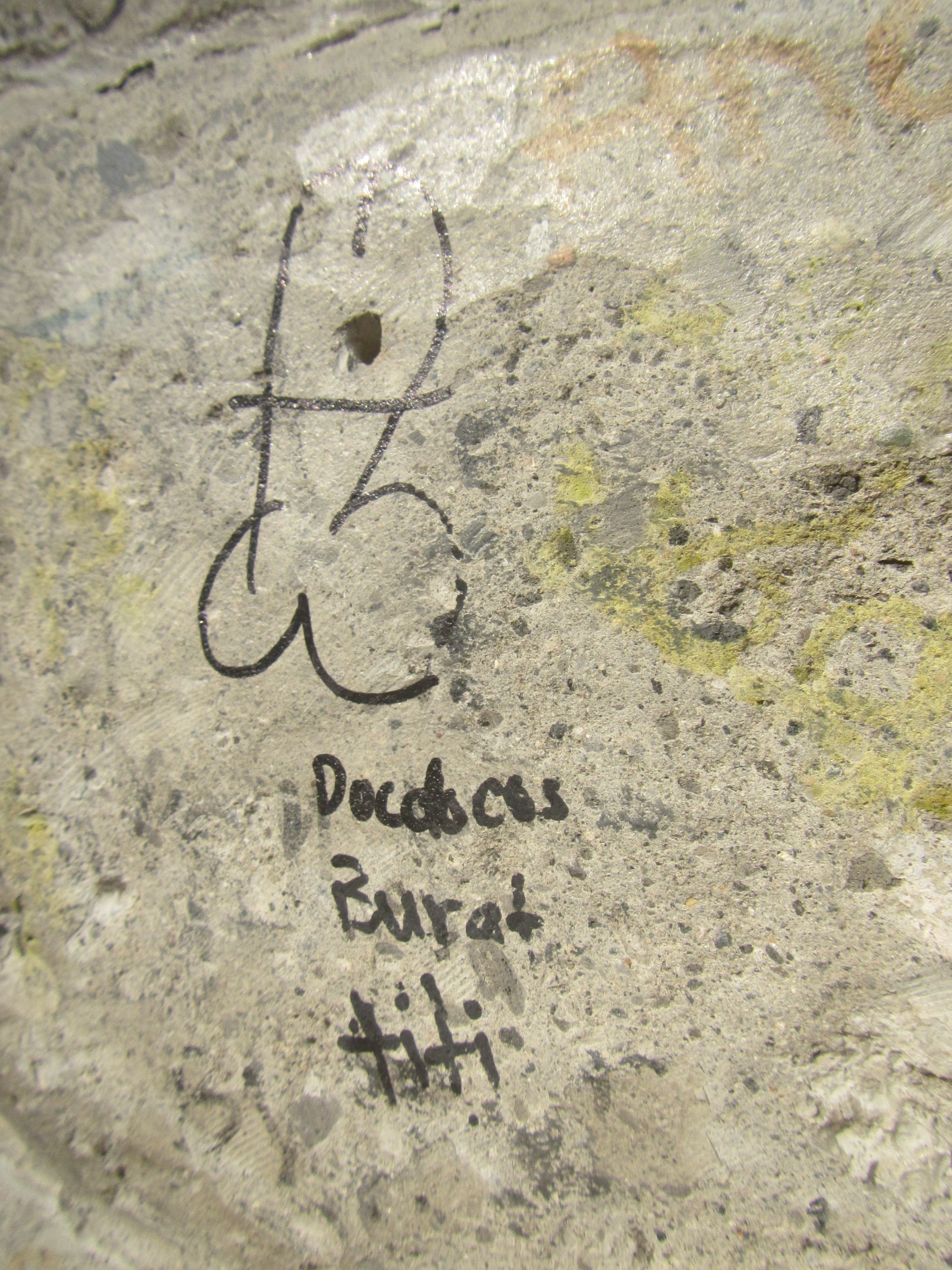
Phallic graffiti on the Pinaglabanan Shrine in San Juan. The inscription reads Docdocos burat titi, insinuating that "Docdocos" has an uncircumcised penis, which is a cultural taboo for young adult males in the Philippines.

Tagalog profanity includes a wide range of offensive, blasphemous, and taboo words or expressions in the Tagalog language of the Philippines. Due to Filipino culture, expressions which may sound benign when translated back to English can cause great offense; while some expressions English speakers might take great offense to can sound benign to a Tagalog speaker. Filipino, the national language of the Philippines, is the standard register of Tagalog, so as such the terms Filipino profanity and Filipino swear words are sometimes also employed.

In Tagalog, profanity has many names: in a religious or formal context, it is called lapastangang pananalita ("blasphemous/irreverent speech") or pag-alipusta/panlalait ("insult"). The word paghamak is also sometimes used formally and has a sense similar to "affront". Colloquially, the words mura ("swear word") and sumumpâ ("to wish evil [on someone]") are used.

Owing to successive Spanish and American colonial administrations, some Tagalog profanity has its etymological roots in the profanity of European languages. Other concepts, like hiya, are similar to sociological concepts such as face, which are common across East Asia.

Unlike in Western culture, where certain words are never acceptable in all but the most informal contexts, Tagalog profanity is context-sensitive: words which are considered profane or insulting in one context are often acceptable in another.

== Putang ina mo ==
Rodrigo Duterte saying putang ina during a 5 September 2016 speech at Francisco Bangoy International Airport.

Owing partly to its use in speeches by 16th Philippine president Rodrigo Duterte, the phrase putang ina mo (sometimes shortened to tang ina or minced as PI) has received considerable international attention and controversy as to its meaning. Puta is a borrowed word from Spanish, in which language it means "whore"; -ng is a contraction of the Filipino word 'ang,' which may translate in English to the linking verb 'is'; Ina is Tagalog for mother, while mo is the indirect second person singular pronoun. Therefore, if translated word-for-word, the phrase means "whore's [whore is] your mother".

However, most Tagalog speakers dispute this simplistic translation, instead alternately rendering the phrase as "son of a bitch", or as a variation of the word "fuck".

According to linguist Ben Zimmer, given the context and how the meaning of puta has shifted in Tagalog, the best translation of Duterte's original expletive directed to US President Barack Obama "Putang-ina, mumurahin kita diyan sa forum na iyan. Huwag mo akong ganunin." would be "Fuck, I will cuss you out at that forum. Don't do that to me."

Besides being directed at people, putang ina can be just as well directed at inanimate objects: University of the Philippines Los Baños Associate Professor of Communication, Research, and Children's Literature Cheeno Marlo M. Sayuno has documented the use of "tang ina error!" as an expression of exasperation due to PC errors, and "Uy net! Putang ina mo!" as something akin to "Hey, [slow] internet [connection], fuck you!" As in the English fucking, the phrase can also be used as an adjective, as in the case of "putanginang aso" ("fucking dog") or "Diyos ko, putanginang buhay ko!" ("God, fuck my shitty life!")

This non-literal meaning of the phrase putang ina mo has twice been affirmed by the Supreme Court of the Philippines: first in 1969 in its decision to Rosauro Reyes v. The People of the Philippines (G.R. No. L-21528 and No. L-21529), and then in 2006 in its decision to Noel Villanueva v. People of the Philippines and Yolanda Castro (G.R. No. 160351). In Reyes, a certiorari appeal to a criminal defamation and grave threats case, the court acquitted the defendant, ruling that his use of a protest sign reading "Agustin, putang ina mo" did not constitute defamation as

[Putang ina mo] is a common enough expression in the dialect that is often employed, not really to slander but rather to express anger or displeasure. It is seldom, if ever, taken in its literal sense by the hearer, that is, as a reflection on the virtues of a mother.

In the 1991 biopic action film Boyong Mañalac: Hoodlum Terminator, the main character (portrayed by Eddie Garcia) and most of the ensemble cast frequently used "Putang ina mo" in most scenes.

In Juan Karlos' song "Ere" in the chorus "Hmm, 'di ba? Nakakaputang ina" ("Hmm, alright, isn't it fucked up?"), Lorin Bektas reads on word until her mother Ruffa Gutierrez asked, "What? Did you say a bad word?" Lorin jokingly said, "It's in Filipino, it doesn't count." Gutierrez posted the video recording their conversation on her TikTok account.

In Tililing, Yumi Lacsamana, Donnalyn Bartolome and Candy Pangilinan use the phrase while fighting over a panty: "Putang Ina mo! Panty ko yan Magnanakaw ka! Panty ko yan!" ("Fuck you! That's my panty you thief! That's my panty"), "Tang ina mo ka! Ayan Isaksak mo! Isaksak mo sa Baga mo!" ("You fucking bitch! Shove it! Shove it into your lungs!") and "Tumahimik Kayo! Putang Ina niyo!" ("Shut up! Fuck you!").

In Revirginized, Sharon Cuneta uses her word while on the beach, "I am sorry, sorry talaga at pakialamera ako, sorry iniintindi ko kayo, Lahat putang ina! iniintindi ko!" ("I am sorry, I'm really sorry and I care, I'm sorry I understand you, All mother whores! I understand!").

In Villanueva, another slander case involving two local politicians of Concepcion, Tarlac, the court reiterated its interpretation of the phrase, but the other facts of the case precluded acquittal.

== Walang hiya ==
Hiya is a Filipino psychological concept similar to face and modesty in other cultures. Author Mary Isabelle Bresnahan has described it thus: "just as the sensitive makahiya plant protects its inside from direct touch, so too do people hold back in defense of loob [their inner selves]." When translated to English, the words "shame", "embarrassment" and "dishonor" can be employed as a substitute for hiya depending on context.

Like much Tagalog profanity, the phrase "Walang hiya ka!" (You have no shame!) can vary in offense taken from very little to "the ultimate loob-wounding comment" depending on context and the relationship between the speaker and the receiver. According to Gerhard van den Top, allegations of shamelessness are most damaging when the social class of people differ, and the poor may consciously avoid interaction with the rich to prevent even unspoken damage to hiya.

In his oft-cited 1964 article "Hiya", psychologist Jaime C. Bulatao defines Walang hiya as "recklessness regarding the social expectations of society, an inconsideration for the feelings of others, and an absence of sensitivity to the censures of authority or society."

== Tae ==
Unlike in many other languages, Tagalog has no word for excrement that would be considered considerably vulgar, such as English shit or Spanish mierda. The two Tagalog words for feces, tae and dumi, are closer to the sense of the English poop. In fact, these words are often used even in medical contexts: a pagtae is a bowel movement, while pagtatae references diarrhea. Tae, is, however, considered by some to be slightly more crass than the more euphemistic dumi. In medical contexts, the words derived from the more euphemistic dumi is used to sound more pleasant, like pagdumi for bowel movement instead of pagtae & pagdudumi/pagdurumi for diarrhea instead of pagtatae. Nevertheless, these words can still be used to cause offence if the speaker adds to them, of course, as in the expression Kumain tae (eat shit). Sometimes, tae can also be used as a variation of tangina mo, replacing it with taena which is used as a milder version of tangina.

== Punyeta ==
Descended from the Spanish puñeta, the Tagalog version of this word is seldom used in the Spanish sense of "wanker", but rather as an interjection expressing frustration, disappointment, or misery. When punyeta is used as an insult directed at a person as in "Mga punyeta kayo!" (You are all punyeta(s)!), it has a sense similar to the English word asshole.

This word was used heavily by John Arcilla, who portrayed General Antonio Luna in the 2015 Philippine epic film Heneral Luna, in lines such as "Ingles-inglesin mo ko sa bayan ko?! Punyeta!" (Speaking English to me in my own country? What an asshole!). Ambeth R. Ocampo, writing in the Philippine Daily Inquirer, criticized the Movie and Television Review and Classification Board (MTRCB) for giving the film a R-18 rating despite the use of this word and others just because the swear words were Spanish-derived. Cristine Reyes was swearing in the catfight scene with Isabelle Daza in ABS-CBN's afternoon Drama Tubig at Langis where shot in Bolinao, Pangasinan, "Halika rito, Punyeta ka! Makati Ka! Makakati Ka!" (Come here, You asshole! You Itch! You Very Itch!), Sharon Cuneta used her word in 2021 Vivamax film Revirginized, in lines such as "sa punyetang ano bang... itong impyernong 'to?!" (in asshole what the hell... is this?!), John Lapus used his word in 2012 film Moron 5 and the Crying Lady, in lines such as "Punyeta Panis!" (That's spoiled asshole!). Other observers have described punyeta as being as obscene as putang ina mo.

== Gago ==
Gago is a descendant of the Spanish word gago, which means "stutterer", but means "stupid", "foolish" or "ignorant" in Tagalog. It is interchangeable with the related terms of native etymology: tanga, (b)ugok, botlog, (b)ulol and bobo.

Slang terms derived from gago are kagaguhan ("a foolish action" [noun form]), ogag (same meaning as gago), and nakakagago ("to be made to feel stupid").

Ulol, loko, and sira-ulo can be used similarly, but they are not interchangeable; they also imply madness or intellectual disability on top of stupidity.

According to Article 27 ("On-Air Language") of the Association of Broadcasters of the Philippines's 2007 Broadcast Code of the Philippines, "Name-calling and personal insults are prohibited." While this code is strictly voluntary and only affects members of the organization, as the organization counts among its members widely syndicated channels such as ABS-CBN and TV5, penalties for breaking this rule affect a large number of broadcasters and media personalities: fines start at ₱15,000, and quickly escalate to ₱25,000 and a 90-day suspension.

Like many Spanish words borrowed into Tagalog, gago is gendered: the female form for a single woman or group of women is gaga, while gago is used for a single man, a group of men, or a group of men and women.

According to the UP Diksiyonaryong Filipino, gago is also used in the sense of mahina ang ulo (a slow learner).

== Pakshet ==
Pakshet is a portmanteau of the English words "fuck" and "shit", altered to fit the phonology of Filipino; the words pak and shet can also be used on their own to similar effect. While most commonly used as an interjection, rather non-intuitively for English speakers, pakshet can also be used as an insult describing a person, as in Pakshet ka!, which could be rendered as Fuck you! or [You] asshole! in English.

Summit Media's Spot.ph online magazine claims that the word pakshet was popularized by the 2002 film Jologs, but given its etymology, it may date back to the first American contacts with the Philippines.

== Bwisit ==
Bwisit (sometimes spelled buwisit), is a Tagalog expression used for unlucky events, or for something that is a nuisance. Mildly vulgar, it derives from the Philippine Hokkien expression 無衣食 (Pe̍h-ōe-jī: bō-uî-sít), literally meaning "without clothes or food". An example of use would be "Buwisit naman 'yang ulan na 'yan", meaning, "Damn that rain!", literally, "That rain is so annoying!" In Tagalog dub of 2gether: The Series, Thai actor Win Metawin on his dub on trailer said "Bwisit Ka!", "Damn you!" or "you're annoying".

== Leche ==
Leche, alternatively "Letse", is used as an expression of annoyance or anger. It can be used as an interjection i.e. "leche!", or in a sentence. It is in the same context of "bwisit" i.e. "bwisit na mga tao 'to; leche na mga tao 'to (lit. these people are annoying) which can be contextually translated to "these fuckin' people." It became popular when Spanish was still the language used by a major demographic in the country. Leche or letse (Spanish for "milk") is derived from the Spanish profanity "Me cago en la leche," which literally translates to "I defecate in the milk" where leche is a euphemism for ley ("law"), referring to the Law of Moses.

== Hayop ==
Hinayupak is another Tagalog vulgar word, referring to a person acting like an animal, which has as its root the word hayop, which means "animal". Hayop can be used on its own as well, as in, mga hayop kayo!, meaning, "you animals!".

== Lintik ==
Lintik is a Tagalog word meaning "lightning", also a mildly profane word used to someone contemptible, being wished to be hit by lightning, such as in "Lintik ka!''. The term is mildly vulgar and an insult, but may be very vulgar in some cases, especially when mixed with other profanity. Sometimes, lintik is also used as a verb through adding verbalizing affixes, such as in "Malilintikan ka sa akin!", that may roughly translate to English "Get damned!" or "Goddamn you!".

== Tarantado ==
From the rootword 'taranta,' which literally means "startle" or "panic," tarantado literally means "easily startled" or "quick to panic." However, as a derogatory word, tarantado means "foolish" or "stupid."

== Blasphemous terms ==
Susmaryosep is a Roman Catholic–inspired profanity invoking the Holy Family, i.e. Jesus, Mary and Joseph. Sus itself can be used as an interjection before a sentence invoking a surprising or annoying thing, such as in, Sus! Ano bang problema mo?, which translates in English meaning "Jesus! What's your problem?". However, the American English sense of suspiciousness became more spread out in the sense of this slang term.

== Sexual terms ==
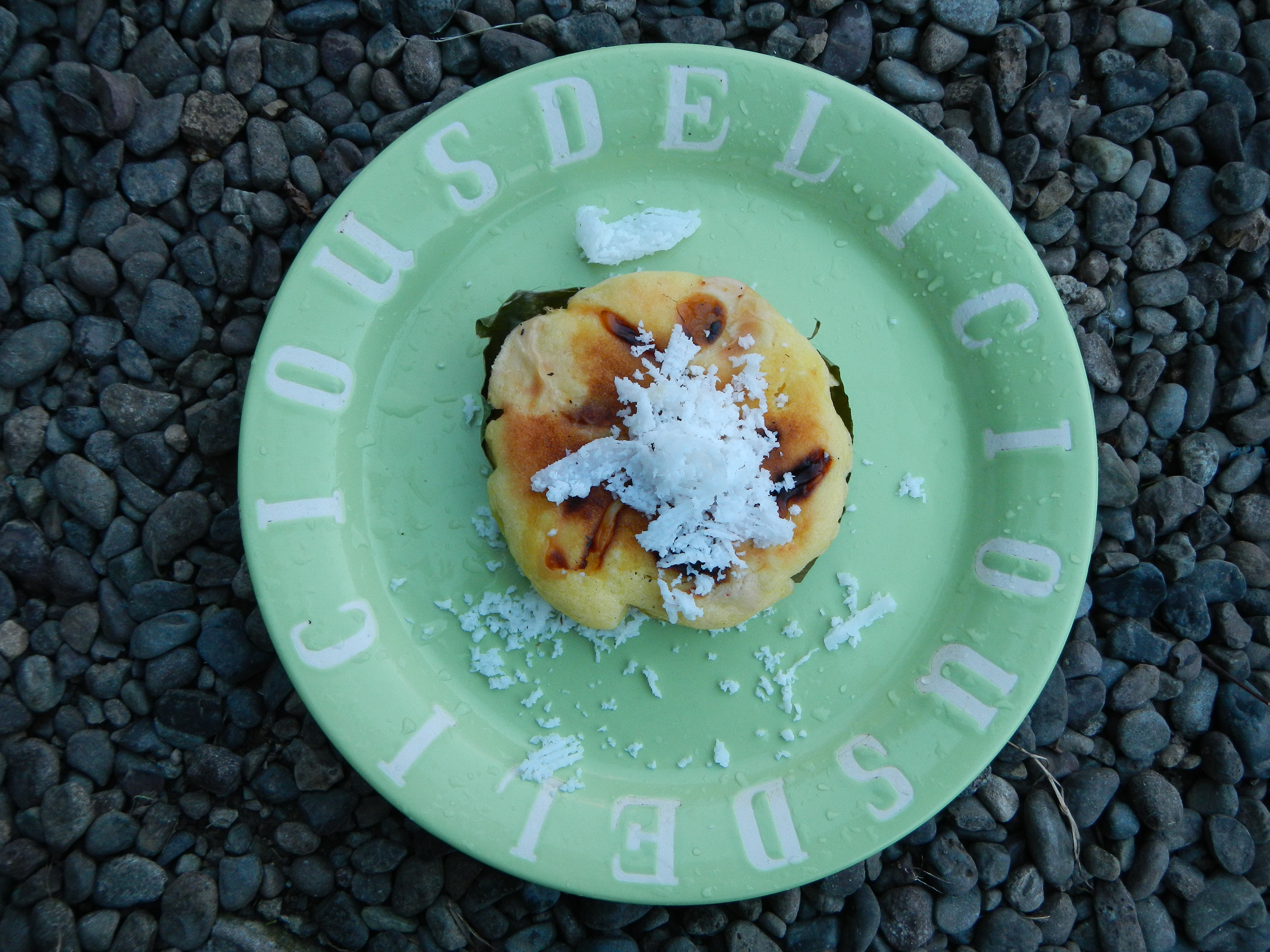
The word bibingka, a type of Filipino rice cake, is a common euphemism for the vagina.

Like most other languages, Tagalog has a wide variety of profane words for the action of intercourse and the names of genitalia or parts thereof.

=== Genitalia ===
In Tagalog, the vagina is most often referred to with the words puki, kiki, pipi, kikay, kiffy, or pekpek; tinggil is used for the clitoris, titi, otin and burat are used for the penis and bayag for the scrotum. All of these words are considered considerably rude in general conversation, and Tan notes that latinate English words for genitalia, such as "penis" and "vagina", are almost always considered more polite.

As in other languages, euphemisms for genitalia abound: the male genitalia may be alternately referred to as a saging (banana), an ahas (snake), or a talong (eggplant), among other names. Researcher Michael Tan notes that the euphemisms for the vagina are considered more vulgar than those for the penis, and as such are fewer; but noted among them are mani (peanut), bibingka and bulaklak (flower). He posits patriarchal norms as the reason for this discrepancy.

Suso is the term most often applied to the breasts, but it is not considered profane and has connotations of breastfeeding; boob, imported from English slang, is the most widely used term for breasts that might be considered impolite. Tagalog has no analog of the vulgar English word ass: the word puwit, meaning buttocks, carries no particular sexual meaning on its own.

Tuli is a male circumcision rite of passage in the Philippines, and being uncircumcised is considered in many parts of the country to be taboo; the vulgar word supot (literally, plastic or paper bag) refers to an uncircumcised male and denotes immaturity, and even poor hygiene. This is not unique to the Philippines; being uncircumcised was once highly taboo in Korea, and remains so among Muslims.

=== Intercourse ===
According to a study involving the use of "sexual keywords" among twenty female participants by researcher Michael L. Tan, sexual terms in Tagalog have widely different connotations: some words, such as kantot or hindut, are undeniably profane in all contexts, while others, such as euphemistic use of the verbs gamit (to use), mag-ano (to do "you know what") or mangyari (to happen), "ginalaw" (to move) are more socially acceptable. Some words for intercourse are English derived: mag-do (to "do it"), mag-sex (to have sex) and the plain verb fuck are reportedly common among upper class Filipinos. "Isinuko ang Bataan" (coined after the "Fall of Bataan" during World War II) is a connotation for a woman to give her virginity to a man by letting him penetrate her.

Tan posits that most sexual language in the Philippines is patriarchal: it focuses on the actions and expectations of the male, rather than female, participants. As an example, gamit tends to be used as Ginamit ako ng mister ko ("My husband 'used' me"), but such turn of phrase would never be used by a straight man. Tan uses other metaphors, such as the relationship between the euphemisms pagdidilig ("to water plants") and magpadilig ("to be watered"), and a woman waiting patiently for sex is described as uhaw (thirsty), to forward this theory: in his view, the Tagalog language subconsciously puts the woman in the passive role.

Anal intercourse, even when between a man and a woman, has its origins in homosexual slang: terms such as an-an and uring are used to describe it. Other names for sexual acts and positions have their histories rooted in Spanish: cunnilingus is referred to as brotsa (from brocha), while fellatio is tsupa (from chupar). Male masturbation can be referred to as jakol, lulu, salsal, bato or bati; descriptions of female masturbation typically employ the verb mag-finger ("to finger oneself").

== Efforts at censorship ==
To avoid breaching broadcast rules, some stations have trialed neural networks which listen to the speech of actors and guests/contestants real time during live performances, and automatically censor certain words. In a paper explaining the system, particular attention was paid by the De La Salle University researchers to censoring potentially insulting words such as gago and ulol.

== See also ==
- Filipino culture
- Filipino psychology
- Swardspeak
- Bakla
