= Sarap Mong Patayin =

2021 black comedy thriller film directed by Darryl Yap

- Official release poster
- Directed by: Darryl Yap
- Written by: Darryl Yap
- Produced by: Vincent del Rosario III; Vic del Rosario Jr.; Veronique del Rosario-Corpus; Hermie Go; Ianne Oandasan; June Torrejon-Rufino
- Starring: Lassy Marquez; Kit Thompson; Ariella Arida; Bob Jbeili; Marion Aunor
- Edited by: Vincent L. Asis
- Music by: Andrew R. Florentino
- Production companies: Viva Films; VinCentiments Entertainment
- Distributed by: Vivamax
- Release date: October 15, 2021 (Philippines)
- Running time: 73 minutes
- Country: Philippines
- Language: Filipino

Sarap Mong Patayin (transl. good to kill) (known as I'd Love to Kill) is a 2021 Philippine psychological comedy thriller film written and directed by Darryl Yap. It stars Lassy Marquez, Kit Thompson, Ariella Arida, Bob Jbeili and Marion Aunor. The film was the 12th film that Darryl Yap directed.

== Plot ==
Noel, a middle-aged gay pest exterminator, has spent years being invisible, disrespected by his clients, dismissed by society, and living in the shadow of people more attractive or desirable than him. His only solace is his friendship with Krista, a gorgeous and self-assured architect who has no idea that Noel secretly envies her beauty and ease in getting attention. Using Krista’s photos without her consent, Noel creates fake profiles on a hookup app called Course, pretending to be her and luring in handsome, horny men for amusement and validation.

One day, Noel matches with Yael, a chiseled, charming gym rat whose smoldering eyes hide a far more twisted personality. Yael seems too perfect, and when “Krista” (Noel’s catfish profile) arranges to meet him, Noel and the real Krista end up confronting the mistake together. But it’s too late. Yael tracks them down. His obsession with the girl in the photos turns into something unhinged when he realizes he’s been tricked.

Yael isn’t just a scorned hookup. He’s a predator. What starts as a confrontation becomes a trap. Yael drugs Noel and Krista, dragging them into his basement gym turned torture chamber, lined with plastic sheets and mirrors. He strips away their clothes and their dignity, taunting them about lies, identity, and the ugliness beneath beauty. Krista, despite being innocent, becomes the focal point of Yael’s rage, he blames her for being the “face” that lured him.

Yael uses his gym equipment not for training, but for mutilation tying Noel to a weight bench and force-feeding him protein shakes laced with sedatives, injecting Krista with steroids while filming her deteriorating state. Blood stains the concrete floor as Yael punishes them for the deception. Yael forces Krista to look in the mirror while he slices her hair off slowly with a box cutter, telling her that beauty is a lie and pain is real.

But Noel, desperate and driven by guilt, manages to escape briefly. He fights back not like a hero, but like a cornered animal. He finds Yael’s stash of drugs and injects him with a cocktail of steroids and pesticides. As Yael convulses on the floor, foaming at the mouth, Noel smashes his face with a dumbbell over and over until there’s nothing left but pulp.

Noel, sustaining severe injuries, escapes the house with Krista as authorities arrive. Following the incident, the police dismiss their accounts regarding the catfishing scheme and Yael's true identity. The event is subsequently portrayed by media reports as a domestic dispute.

Noel is left scarred, both physically and emotionally. He deletes the app, burns the fake profiles, and lives in isolation. Krista, disfigured and traumatized, vanishes from public life. The final shot is Noel staring at his reflection in a mirror cracked with dried blood, whispering the line: “Ang sarap mong patayin”. (Note: This is where the title came from)

== Cast ==
- Lassy Marquez as Noel
- Kit Thompson as Yael
- Ariella Arida as Krista
- Bob Jbeili as Emman
- Marion Aunor as Nirvana
- Tart Carlos as Tiya Salve
- Dan Carlos Gonzales as Young Yael
- Leslie Lacap as Sumpong 1
- Faith Medina as Sumpong 2
- Beatriz Jean David as Sumpong 3

== Release ==
The film was released in the Philippines via streaming in Vivamax on October 15, 2021.
