= Barumbadings =

2021 film directed by Darryl Yap

- Official release poster
- Directed by: Darryl Yap
- Written by: Darryl Yap
- Produced by: Vincent Del Rosario III; Vic Del Rosario Jr.; Veronique Del Rosario-Corpus; Hermie Go; Ianne Oandasan; June Torrejon-Rufino
- Starring: Joel Torre; Jeric Raval; Mark Anthony Fernandez; Baron Geisler; John Lapus
- Cinematography: Rain Yamson
- Edited by: Vincent L. Asis
- Music by: Andrew R. Florentino
- Production companies: VinCentiments; Viva Films
- Distributed by: Vivamax
- Release date: November 5, 2021
- Running time: 75 minutes
- Country: Philippines
- Language: Filipino

Barumbadings (also known as BarumBadings: Vol 1. Dead Mother, Dead All) is a 2021 Philippine black comedy crime action film written and directed by Darryl Yap. It stars Joel Torre, Jeric Raval, Mark Anthony Fernandez, Baron Geisler and John Lapus. The film is about three gay gangsters who mourn the death of their gay guardian, but ends up celebrating his bright and colorful life. The main characters are named after the main members of the SexBomb Girls and their manager, Joy Cancio.

== Plot ==
Izzy (Jeric Raval), Jopay (Mark Anthony Fernandez) and Rochelle (Baron Geisler) are gays-in-training for beauty pageants under the care of their adoptive gay mother, Joy (Joel Torre). When Joy passes away, they become part of an intense feud against lesbians.

== Cast ==
- Joel Torre as Mother Joy: The one who adopted the three gays, Izzy, Jopay and Rochelle.
- Jeric Raval as Izzy
- Mark Anthony Fernandez as Jopay
- Baron Geisler as Rochelle
- John Lapus as Queenpin: The leader of Barumbadings and the one who giving orders to Izzy, Jopay and Rochelle.
- Francine Garcia as Trixie
- Cecil Paz as Buchi the Butcher: Queenpin ex-lover.
- Carlo Mendoza as Young Rochelle
- Janrey Torres as Young Izzy
- Lance Russell Obrero as Young Jopay
- Jobelyn Manuel as Right Finger of Buchi
- Loren Mirañas as Left Finger of Buchi

== Release ==
The film was released in the Philippines via streaming in Vivamax on November 5, 2021.

== Reception ==
JE CC of PinoyFeeds give the film a positive review and he wrote:

Action and comedy make a satisfying marriage in this Darryl Yap feature that tackles hate crimes against gay people.

== Future ==
Baron Geisler confirmed that he is part of all 4 upcoming sequels of Barumbadings.

As of November 2025, there has been no update on the sequel's development.
