= Revirginized =

- Theatrical release poster
- Directed by: Darryl Yap
- Written by: Darryl Yap
- Story by: Darryl Yap
- Produced by: Vincent Del Rosario III; Veronique Del Rosario-Corpus
- Starring: Sharon Cuneta
- Production company: Viva Films
- Distributed by: KTX.ph; iWantTFC; IPTV; Sky PPV
- Release date: August 6, 2021
- Running time: 97 minutes
- Country: Philippines
- Language: Filipino

Revirginized is a 2021 Philippine sex comedy film directed by Darryl Yap under Viva Films and starring Sharon Cuneta.

== Premise ==
Carmela gets pregnant at age 16 therefore she never got a proper coming of age experience. As an adult, Carmela deals with the end of her marriage with her husband Bart. She meets her goddaughter and her friends who are going to a beach party and coerces her goddaughter to let her join the event threatening to snitch her to her mother if she does not comply. At the beach, Carmela parties and "rediscovers" her youth in the process. She goes on to have a one night stand with Morph, a young hunk, who later confesses his own feelings for her.

== Cast ==
- Sharon Cuneta as Carmela
  - Paula Palomata as Young Carmela
- Marco Gumabao as Morph
- Rosanna Roces as Girlie
  - Loren Mariñas as Young Girlie
- Albert Martinez as Bart
  - Neil Villanueva as Young Bart
- Cristina Gonzales as Charlotte
- Kylie Verzosa as Czarina
- Rose van Ginkel as Jen
- Marion Aunor as Liz
- Jobelyn Manuel as Beverly
- Abby Bautista as Cheska
- Ogie Diaz as Mediator
- Carla del Rosario as Young Virgie

== Production ==
Revirginized, under the working title MILF, was produced under Viva Films with Daryl Yap as director. Principal photography took place in Subic which started in March 2021.

=== Casting ===
Sharon Cuneta remarking about choosing to star in Revirginized said she has often featured in "wholesome" and bad words movies in the past adding that she accepted to get involved in the film for a more challenging role. According to director Daryl Yap, the inspiration for Carmela's character is Sharon Cuneta herself since he intends Revirginized to be a tribute to his mother who is a Sharonian or an avid fan of the actress. Yap said he wanted to present the "most shocking" version of the actress through his film.

== Release and reception ==
Revirginized was a commercial success upon its arrival. It was first released through online streaming platforms on August 6, 2021 on KTX.ph, iWantTFC, IPTV, Sky PPV and had limited theatrical release in selected cinemas in the United States and Canada on August 13, 2021. The film was the most watched movie on Vivamax and the best-selling film on KTX.ph in terms of the number of pre-sold tickets. As of August 2021, Revirginized ranked at No. 7 among contents with highest number of single day views on Vivamax.

== Soundtrack ==
Revirginized (Original Movie Soundtrack)
| No. | Title | Performer(s) | Length |
|---|---|---|---|
| 1. | "No Apology (Wala Akong Paki)" | Karencitta | 2:44 |
| 2. | "Maganda Kahit Matanda" | Marion Aunor | 3:48 |
| 3. | "Umibig Muli" | Janine Teñoso | 4:20 |
| Total length: | | | 11:05 |

== Accolades ==
| Award | Category | Recipient | Result |
|---|---|---|---|
| FAMAS Awards | Best Actress | Sharon Cuneta | Nominated |
| PMPC Star Awards for Movies | Movie Actress of the Year | Sharon Cuneta | Nominated |
| PMPC Star Awards for Movies | Movie Production Designer of the Year | Ericson Navarro | Nominated |
