= Pepsi Paloma =

Filipino actress (1966–1985)

- Born: Delia Dueñas Smith; July 17, 1966; Manila, Philippines
- Died: May 31, 1985 (aged 18); Quezon City, Philippines
- Cause of death: Suicide by hanging
- Occupations: Actress; dancer; entertainer
- Years active: 1980–1985

Delia Dueñas Smith (July 17, 1966 – May 31, 1985), better known as Pepsi Paloma, was a Filipino dancer and actress in the Philippines. She was one of the popular Softdrinks Beauties introduced in the 1980s along with Sarsi Emmanuelle, Coca Nicolas and Mirinda Manibog.

== Personal life ==
Paloma was born as Delia Dueñas Smith on July 17, 1966. She was the eldest daughter of Lydia Dueñas, a native of Northern Samar, and an American letter carrier, Kenneth Smith, who abandoned his family when the children were still young.

== Career ==
At 14, a talent scout named Tita Ester brought Paloma to talent manager Rey dela Cruz in 1980 for a possible film career. In 1981, she made her debut in the movie Brown Emmanuelle. She was given the stage name Pepsi Paloma and was promoted as one of the members of the so-called “soft drink” beauties together with Coca Nicolas and Sarsi Emmanuelle.

== Filmography ==
To date, Paloma was known for films such as Brown Emanuelle (1981), The Victim (1982), Krus sa Bawat Punglo (1982), Virgin People (1983), Snake Sisters (1984), Naked Island (1984), Matukso kaya ang Anghel? (1984) and Room 69 (1985).

Year	Title
1981	Brown Emmanuelle
1982	The Victim
1982	Krus sa Bawat Punglo
1983	Virgin People
1983	Suicide Mama
1984	Snake Sisters
1984	Naked Island (Butil-ulan)
1984	Matukso Kaya Ang Anghel
1985	Room 69

== Rape case and aftermath ==
After appearing in a handful of films, Paloma was involved in a highly publicized scandal when she accused comedians Vic Sotto, Joey de Leon and Ricardo "Richie D'Horsie" Reyes of rape. According to Paloma's account, she and fellow actress Guada Guarin were drugged, brought to a room at the Sulô Hotel in Quezon City, and then raped. Actor and senator Tito Sotto, who is also Vic's older brother, soon became involved, compelling Paloma to drop the charges by allegedly intimidating her with a gun. Sotto had drawn up an Affidavit of Desistance and obtained her signature, although some newspaper reports stated that it was Pepsi's mother who signed the document on her behalf. Had the suspects been convicted of the charges, they would have faced the death penalty—execution by electric chair, the same fate that befell three of four convicted rapists in actress Maggie de la Riva's case two decades prior.

Although the three suspects initially denied Paloma's accusations, they later issued a public apology, on their knees on live TV, and in an article published by the People's Journal on October 13, 1982, saying:

We hope that you will not allow the error we have committed against you to stand as a stumbling block to that future which we all look forward to. We therefore ask you to find it in your heart to pardon us for the wrong which we have done against you.

Due to the signed Affidavit of Desistance, Paloma did not pursue her complaint and the case did not go to court.

== Death ==
On May 31, 1985, Paloma was found dead in her apartment, in an apparent suicide by hanging. According to police investigation, the rape case was one factor of her suicide. A diary, citing monetary problems and anxieties over her relationship with her mother and her boyfriend was found in her bedroom, although the authenticity of the journal entries have been questioned, especially by her manager Babette "Babe" Corcuerra, who claims she was actually earning well. She was buried at Olongapo Memorial Park in Olongapo, Zambales.

== Aftermath ==
Despite the suspects' earlier apology, Tito Sotto has maintained his position against any involvement in the whitewashing of the rape case and alleges that the scandal was a gimmick by Paloma's party for publicity. Sotto said that he was not involved as a perpetrator in the rape of Paloma and he denied using his position in government to influence the court decision. Sotto became Vice Mayor in Quezon City in 1988 before being elected as a Senator in 1992. In 2018, the elder Sotto requested The Philippine Inquirer to remove published articles available online mentioning the Pepsi Paloma Case damaging to his reputation as a Senator; this in turn led to an instance of the Streisand effect where netizens mirrored and shared posts on social media about the rape case, sparked renewed public interest into the Pepsi Paloma affair. In a 2024 interview by Julius Babao to fellow Softdrink Beauty Coca Nicolas, she denied the allegations and maintained that the TVJ rape scandal was merely a publicity stunt orchestrated by their manager, Rey dela Cruz, and that no such sexual assault actually took place. In another interview with Babao, fellow Softdrink Beauty Sarsi Emmanuelle subtly denied the allegations, and mentioned that it was depression that drew Pepsi to suicide and none of the allegations were real. In a more recent interview, Babao interviewed the Softdrink Beauties Sarsi Emanuelle, Coca Nicola, and Myra Manibog, who unanimously deny all allegations without much detail but cited that it was personal issues with her family that led to depression and, eventually, to her suicide.

== In popular culture ==
In late 2025, filmmaker Darryl Yap announced a forthcoming film titled The Rapists of Pepsi Paloma, aiming to depict the events surrounding the 1982 scandal. The project has generated discussion and debate, with some expressing concerns about its portrayal of sensitive historical events. Former child actress Rhed Bustamante has been cast in the film. The planned release of The Rapists of Pepsi Paloma has reignited public interest in Paloma's life and the controversies she was involved in, prompting discussions about media representation, historical accountability, and the ethical considerations of dramatizing real-life events. The film, now titled Pepsi Paloma for its Philippine release, is scheduled to premiere on February 5, 2025. But the distributor is open for rescheduling the film if the specific requirements is not acquired. Its international release will retain the original title.

== See also ==
- Spoliarium (Eraserheads song)
- The Rapists of Pepsi Paloma (film)
