= Pornstar 2: Pangalawang Putok =

2021 Comedy film directed by Darryl Yap

- Official release poster
- Directed by: Darryl Yap
- Written by: Darryl Yap
- Story by: Darryl Yap
- Produced by: Vincent Del Rosario III; Veronique Del Rosario-Corpus
- Starring: Rosanna Roces; Alma Moreno; Ara Mina; Maui Taylor
- Cinematography: Rain Yamson
- Edited by: Vincent L. Asis
- Music by: Andrew R. Florentino
- Production companies: Viva Films; VinCentiments
- Distributed by: Vivamax
- Release date: December 3, 2021
- Country: Philippines
- Language: Filipino

Pornstar 2: Pangalawang Putok (stylized as #Pornstar 2: Pangalawang Putok) is a 2021 Philippine sex comedy film written and directed by Darryl Yap. A sequel to Paglaki Ko, Gusto Kong Maging Pornstar and produced by Vincent Del Rosario III and Veronique Del Rosario-Corpus. It stars Rosanna Roces, Alma Moreno, Ara Mina and Maui Taylor.

== Cast ==
- Rosanna Roces as herself
- Alma Moreno as herself
- Ara Mina as herself
- Maui Taylor as herself
- Lara Morena as Lara
- Ayanna Misola as Trinidad/Trina
- Cara Gonzales as Melchora/Melch
- Stephanie Raz as Josefa/Sefa
- Sab Aggabao as Gabriela/Gabby
- Abed Green as Abed
- Prince Salvador as Park Bojum
- Jet Delgado as Isagani
- Rash Flores as Rashad
- Benjo Seijo as Palawan Boy

== Release ==
The film has been announced and was released on December 3, 2021, on Vivamax.

== Soundtrack ==
Pornstar 2: Pangalawang Putok OST
No.	Title	Artist	Length
1.	"Rosas"	Magnus Haven	3:30
2.	"Mani"	Fred Panopio	2:41
3.	"Nanggigigil"	Hagibis	4:38
4.	"Babae"	Hagibis	4:45
5.	"Lalake"	Hagibis	4:25
6.	"Dale Dale"	SB NewGen	3:19

- Rosas

Performed by Magnus Haven Lyrics: Rey Maestro Music: Magnus Haven - Rey Maestro, David Galang, Sean Michael Espejo Catalla, Louise Rafael Vaflor, Rajih Emmanuel Mendoza Published by Blacksheep Records Manila Produced by Robert Javier, Jaworski Garcia, David Galang Arranged by Rey Maestro, David Galang Recorded, mixed and mastered by Robert Javier, Jaworski Garcia, David Galang at Viva Recording Studios Courtesy of Blacksheep Records Manila.

- Mani

Performed by Fred Panopio Composed by Ernie de la Peña Published by ABS-CBN Film Productions, Inc./Star Songs (BAMI) Courtesy of Vicor Music Corporation.

- Nanggigigil

Performed by Hagibis Composed by Mike Hanopol Published by ABS-CBN Film Productions, Inc./Star Songs (BAMI) Produced by Mike Hanopol, Tony Huelves Arranged by Mike Hanopol Courtesy of Vicor Music Corporation.

- Babae

Performed by Hagibis Composed by Mike Hanopol Published by ABS-CBN Film Productions, Inc./Star Songs (BAMI) Produced by Mike Hanopol, Tony Huelves Arranged by Mike Hanopol Courtesy of Vicor Music Corporation.

- Lalake

Performed by Hagibis Composed by Mike Hanopol, Tony Huelves Published by ABS-CBN Film Productions, Inc./Star Songs (BAMI) Courtesy of Vicor Music Corporation.

- Dale dale

Performed by Sexbomb New Generation (as SB New Gen) Feat. Cursebox Composed by Hazel Faith Dela Cruz (as Hazel Faith), Keshia Almoroto, Jara Nakamura, and Eunice Creus (as Unise Creus) Published by Viva Music Publishing Inc. Produced and arranged by Cursebox (as Michael 'Cursebox' Negapatan) Production house/studio: Cursebox Productions Recorded, mixed and mastered by Cursebox (as Michael 'Cursebox' Negapatan) Courtesy of Viva Records Corporation.
