= Death of a Girlfriend =

2021 horror film by Yam Laranas

- Official movie poster
- Directed by: Yam Laranas
- Written by: Yam Laranas
- Produced by: Vincent del Rosario III; Veronique del Rosario-Corpus; Valerie Del Rosario
- Starring: Diego Loyzaga; AJ Raval
- Cinematography: Yam Laranas
- Edited by: Jao Elamparo
- Music by: Oscar Fogelström
- Production company: Viva Films
- Distributed by: Viva Films (Vivamax)
- Release date: April 30, 2021
- Running time: 113 minutes
- Country: Philippines
- Language: Filipino

Death of a Girlfriend is a 2021 Philippine horror film written, photographed, and directed by Yam Laranas. The film stars Diego Loyzaga and AJ Raval in the title role.

== Plot ==
The murder of Christine has three sides of the story, each told by her boyfriend, Alonzo, a forest ranger, and a farmer. The latter two are considered the prime suspects.

== Cast ==
- Diego Loyzaga as Alonzo
- AJ Raval as Christine
- Arnold Reyes as Forest Ranger
- Raul Morit as Farmer
- Soliman Cruz as Interrogator

== Production ==
The film is inspired by the 1950 Japanese film Rashomon. Raval's character is inspired by the 1960 Swedish film The Virgin Spring.

This is Yam Laranas' first screenplay, written when he was still in film school at Mowelfund.
