= Tililing =

2021 Comedy film directed by Darryl Yap

- Official release poster
- Directed by: Darryl Yap
- Written by: Darryl Yap
- Produced by: Vincent Del Rosario III; Veronique Del Rosario-Corpus
- Starring: Baron Geisler; Candy Pangilinan; Chad Kinis; Gina Pareño; Donnalyn Bartolome; Cai Cortez; Rez Cortez
- Cinematography: Rain Yamson
- Edited by: Vincent L. Asis
- Music by: Emerson Texon
- Production companies: Viva Films; VinCentiments
- Distributed by: Viva Entertainment
- Release date: March 5, 2021
- Country: Philippines
- Language: Filipino

Tililing is a 2021 Philippine musical black comedy film written and directed by Darryl Yap. Vincent Del Rosario III and Veronique Del Rosario-Corpus are the producers of the film. It stars Baron Geisler, Candy Pangilinan, Chad Kinis, Gina Pareño, Donnalyn Bartolome, Cai Cortez and Rez Cortez.

== Synopsis ==
Three intern nurses get locked down in an asylum where they meet three special patients. Together, they attempt to escape before the other patients kill them.

== Cast ==
- Baron Geisler as Peter
- Chad Kinis as Bernie
- Gina Pareño as Socorro
- Candy Pangilinan as Maricel
- Donnalyn Bartolome as Espie
- Yumi Lacsamana as Jessa
- Cai Cortez as Divina
- Rez Cortez as Peter's Father
- J.P. Herminigildo as Young Peter
- Liz Gonzaga as Young Socorro
- Edgie Flores as Yolly
- Loren Mariñas as Tabitha
- Paul Henderson as Chief Guard
- Erol De Guzman as Pulis
- Manuel Ambasa as Tatay ni Bernie
- Myrna Hidoc as Nanay ni Bernie
- Billy Jake Cortez as Felipe

== Production ==
Tililing was originally a theater play entitled Turnilyo written also by Darryl Yap in 2009. The play was first performed at the Subic Bay Arts Center in 2010. By 2020, the film is already ready to be theatrically released but this plan was hampered by the COVID-19 pandemic.

== Marketing ==
Portion of the original poster which was subject to controversy due to being perceived as perpetuating stigma and negative stereotypes related to mental health.

The initial film poster in early 2021 for Tililing featuring the characters making funny faces drew negative reception. The Commission on Human Rights believed that the poster promotes stigma and negative stereotypes of people experiencing mental health issues. The Psychological Association of the Philippines released a statement urging for responsible portrayal of mental health in media.Tililing was perceived to be a film made at the expense of people experiencing mental health issues but director Daryll Yap assured that the production team is "together" with mental health advocates when they made the film. A new film poster was later released. Actress Liza Soberano posted on X (formerly Twitter) about mental health.

=== Profanities need a censor beep ===
This movie has a full of profanities like in scene of fighting over panties while Jessa (Yumi Lacsamana) accuses Espie (Donnalyn Bartolome) as a thief.

== Release ==
The film was released via streaming in Vivamax (now VMX) and had a limited release on March 5, 2021.

== Soundtrack ==
Tililing OST
No.	Title	Artist	Length
1.	"Tililing"	Katrina Velarde, Yumi Lacsamana, Nicole Omillo	4:21
2.	"Mamang Sorbetero"	Donnalyn Bartolome	2:43

- Tililing

Performed by Yumi Lacsamana, Nicole Omillo, Katrina Velarde Words and music by Thyro Alfaro and Yumi Lacsamana Published by Viva Music Philippines, Inc. Produced and arranged by Thyro Alfaro Mixed and mastered by Thyro Alfaro and Yumi Lacsamana Nicole Omillo's vocals recorded by Thyro Alfaro at LoudBox Studios Katrina Velarde's vocals recorded by Dennis Tolentino at Viva Recording Studios Courtesy of Viva Records Corporation.

- Mamang Sorbetero

Performed by Donnalyn Bartolome Composed by Jose Mari Chan and Gryk Ortaleza (as Eduard 'Gryk' Ortaleza) Published by Signature Music, Inc. Arranged by Tommy Katigbak Produced by Civ Fontanilla Mixed and mastered by Joel Mendoza (as Joserlito Mendoza) Recorded by Ponz Martinez at Viva Recording Studios Courtesy of Viva Records Corporation.

== Reception ==
JE CC of LionhearTV give the film 1 out of 5 rating and wrote:

Yap’s fashion of dealing with these characters is visual-driven, but unfortunately, lacked sense and organization.
