= The Rapists of Pepsi Paloma =

Unreleased film by Darryl Yap

- Philippine theatrical release poster
- Directed by: Darryl Yap
- Screenplay by: Darryl Yap
- Produced by: Darryl Yap
- Starring: Rhed Bustamante; Mon Confiado; Gina Alajar
- Production companies: VinCentiments; Prodmo Productions
- Distributed by: PinoyFlix Films; Entertainment Production
- Country: Philippines
- Language: Filipino

The Rapists of Pepsi Paloma, also known as simply Pepsi Paloma for the domestic release, is an unreleased Philippine biographical drama film written and directed by Darryl Yap. It stars Rhed Bustamante, Mon Confiado, Gina Alajar, Andres Balano Jr. and Shamaine Buencamino. This is the first film by Darryl Yap not to be produced and distributed by Viva Films because of sensitive matter involving TVJ.

Due to controversies surrounding the director and his film, some cinemas in the Philippines rejected the word "Rapist" in the title of the film, Darry Yap changed the title from The Rapists of Pepsi Paloma to Pepsi Paloma for Philippine release and the original title retains for international release.

== Cast ==
- Rhed Bustamante as Delia Dueñas Smith/Pepsi Paloma
- Gina Alajar as Charito Solis
- Mon Confiado as Rey Dela Cruz, Paloma's talent manager.
- Andres Balano Jr. as Richie D'Horsie
- Shamaine Buencamino as Lydia Dueñas Whitley, Paloma's mother
- Rosanna Roces as Divina Valencia
- Jun Nayra as Rene Cayetano, Paloma's lawyer
- Beverly Salviejo as Monica, a talent scout who introduced Paloma to Rey dela Cruz
- Juliana Parizcova Segovia as Ebony, a make-up artist and friend of Pepsi

== Production ==
Director Darryl Yap gained interest to make a film about the life story of the deceased Pepsi Paloma because they have the same hometown and he announced it on October 28, 2024.

The film was revealed when director Darryl Yap posted in his social media account a teaser poster of the film together with the cast and a teaser trailer on January 1, 2025.

Yap declared the film finished on January 22, 2025, despite the last minute disruption to the process such as the revocation of rights to use certain songs for the film following the legal challenges arising from the teaser.

== Release ==
The film, now titled Pepsi Paloma for its Philippine release, the film was originally scheduled to premiere on February 5, 2025, but two days prior on February 3, 2025, director Yap said that the film will not be released on the said date due to incomplete requirements that the Movie and Television Review and Classification Board (MTRCB) required to release the film.

The film is said to be pending documentary requirements before it could get reviewed by the MTRCB. On January 28, 2025, Darryl Yap posted on his social media account claiming that his film was being reviewed by MTRCB but on January 29, 2025, the government agency denied his claim.

Its international release will retain the original title The Rapists of Pepsi Paloma. PinoyFlix Films and Entertainment Production, Inc. was picked up for PH distribution. Previously Yap has claimed that prior distributors of the film withdrew following the lawsuit on the teaser.

== Marketing ==
Yap released to his social media account the teaser trailer of the film together with a cast and teaser poster on January 1, 2025.

After the release of the teaser trailer of the film which mentioned the name and confirming that Paloma was raped by Vic Sotto, the teaser ignited online discussions and mixed reactions from netizens, some praising Yap's bold storytelling and others criticizing the film's possible impact on Paloma's family and its sensitive nature. Some critics called Yap disrespectful and insulting and questioned director Yap about his intentions. In a social media post, Yap defended his upcoming film and said that the film is not about "TVJ" (Tito Sotto, Vic Sotto and Joey de Leon), but about Pepsi Paloma.

== Lawsuit ==
On January 9, 2025, a Muntinlupa Regional Trial Court granted Sotto's petition and issued a writ of habeas data. The prerogative writ ordered the censorship of portions of the Pepsi Paloma promotional teaser trailer and at the same time required respondent Darryl Yap to submit an answer. In Cristy FerMinute, lawyer Enrique "Buko" V. Dela Cruz Jr. revealed that Sotto's daughter Talitha "Tali" Maria Luna was subject of school bullying because of Yap's alleged defamation.

According to a news update from TV5, Eat Bulaga! host and veteran actor Vic Sotto with his legal counsel filed on January 9, 2025, complaints against filmmaker Darryl Yap with the Muntinlupa City Regional Trial Court after the teaser trailer mentioned his name which then trended on social media. Yap is facing 19 counts of violation for cyberlibel and damages amounting ₱35 million under Section 4 of Republic Act No. 10175, also known as the Cybercrime Prevention Act of 2012.

The Muntinlupa Regional Trial Court (RTC) ordered to take down the teaser trailer that Darry Yap released on January 1, 2025. Although the teaser trailer was taken down, Judge Liezel Aquiatan allowed the continuation of the film's production and release.

On March 18, 2025, still with the mentioned RTC government prosecutors filed two informations for cyberlibel against Darryl Yap before the court after finding prima facie evidence against the filmmaker in connection with the controversial teaser of this film.

== See also ==
- "Spoliarium", song by Eraserheads which was the subject of an urban legend alleging that it was an allegory to the Paloma affair
