= Minsan pa Nating Hagkan ang Nakaraan =

Philippine romantic drama television series

- Title card
- Genre: Romance; Melodrama
- Based on: Minsan pa Nating Hagkan ang Nakaraan (film) by Carlo J. Caparas
- Written by: Ceres Helga Barrios; Rio Jane Legaspi; James Calinaya; Paolo Martin Valconcha
- Directed by: Jerome Chavez Pobocan; Claudio "Tots" Sanchez-Mariscal
- Starring: Cesar Montano; Marco Gumabao; Cristine Reyes
- Opening theme: "Hindi Tayo Pwede" by Katrina Velarde
- Composer: Carl Guevara
- Country of origin: Philippines
- Original language: Filipino
- No. of episodes: 65

Production
- Executive producers: Vic del Rosario, Jr.; Jane Jimenez-Basas
- Producers: Vincent del Rosario III; Valerie S. del Rosario; Veronique del Rosario-Corpus; Sienna Olaso; Maru Benitez
- Editor: Alexces Megan Abarquez-Baliao
- Camera setup: Multiple-camera
- Running time: 45–60 minutes
- Production company: Studio Viva

Original release
- Network: TV5
- Release: July 25 – October 20, 2023

Minsan pa Nating Hagkan ang Nakaraan (transl. let's kiss the past one more time) is a 2023 Philippine television drama romance series broadcast by TV5. The series is an adaptation of the 1983 Filipino film of the same title. Directed by Jerome Chavez Pobocan and Tots Mariscal, it stars Cesar Montano, Marco Gumabao and Cristine Reyes. It premiered on July 25, 2023 on the network's Hapon Champion line up. The series concluded on October 20, 2023 with a total of 65 episodes.

== Plot ==
Helen is torn between two people: Rod, her old flame who mysteriously leaves her confused and heartbroken; and Cenon, an old man who will make her fall in love again.

== Cast and characters ==
Lead cast

- Cesar Montano as Cenon Aurelio
- Marco Gumabao as Rod Herrera
- Cristine Reyes as Helen Bautista

Supporting cast

- Lito Pimentel as Tonyo Bautista
- Mickey Ferriols as Teresa "Tessa" Bautista
- Lara Morena as Rona Herrera
- Suzette Ranillo as Salud Aurelio
- Cindy Miranda as Victoria Merrit
- Felix Roco as Ryan Bautista
- Josef Elizalde as Matthew "Matt" Cancio
- Mayton Eugenio as Krizzy Vidal
- Abby Bautista as Alfea Herrera
- Keagan de Jesus as Yves Herrera
- Patrick Sagui as Harold

== Episodes ==
Minsan pa Nating Hagkan ang Nakaraan episodes
No.	Title	Original release date	AGB Nielsen Ratings (NUTAM People)
1	"Simula ng Nakaraan"	July 25, 2023	N/A
2	"Mentorship"	July 26, 2023	0.9%
3	"Mi Love Ko"	July 27, 2023	N/A
4	"Serendipity"	July 28, 2023	N/A
5	"Move On"	July 29, 2023	N/A
6	"Resurrect"	July 31, 2023	N/A
7	"Backtrack"	August 1, 2023	N/A
8	"Uninvited"	August 2, 2023	N/A
9	"Rage"	August 3, 2023	N/A
10	"Family Ties"	August 4, 2023	N/A
11	"The Plan"	August 7, 2023	N/A
12	"Furious"	August 8, 2023	N/A
13	"Warning Shot"	August 9, 2023	N/A
14	"Alliance"	August 10, 2023	N/A
15	"Bantay Sarado"	August 11, 2023	N/A
16	"Affected"	August 14, 2023	N/A
17	"Marupok"	August 15, 2023	N/A
18	"Trapped"	August 16, 2023	N/A
19	"Confession"	August 17, 2023	N/A
20	"Invade"	August 18, 2023	N/A
21	"Besties"	August 21, 2023	N/A
22	"Worst Nightmare"	August 22, 2023	N/A
23	"Choke"	August 23, 2023	N/A
24	"Hindi na Puwede"	August 24, 2023	N/A
25	"Mad"	August 25, 2023	N/A
26	"Intoxicated"	August 28, 2023	N/A
27	"Fake It"	August 29, 2023	N/A
28	"I Stand With Helen"	August 30, 2023	N/A
29	"Encounter"	August 31, 2023	N/A
30	"For Better or Worse"	September 1, 2023	N/A
31	"Mind Games"	September 4, 2023	N/A
32	"Gaslighting"	September 5, 2023	N/A
33	"Gaslighted"	September 6, 2023	N/A
34	"The Gaslighter"	September 7, 2023	N/A
35	"Vulnerable"	September 8, 2023	N/A
36	"Fall From Grace"	September 11, 2023	N/A
37	"Manipulation"	September 12, 2023	N/A
38	"Silenced"	September 13, 2023	N/A
39	"Whodunit"	September 14, 2023	N/A
40	"Red-handed"	September 15, 2023	N/A
41	"Ordeal"	September 18, 2023	N/A
42	"Truthbomb"	September 19, 2023	N/A
43	"Forceful Abuse"	September 20, 2023	N/A
44	"Captive"	September 21, 2023	N/A
45	"Break Free"	September 22, 2023	N/A
46	"Search is On"	September 25, 2023	N/A
47	"Finding Helen"	September 26, 2023	N/A
48	"Huli Ka"	September 27, 2023	N/A
49	"Shookt"	September 28, 2023	N/A
50	"The Big Surprise"	September 29, 2023	N/A
51	"Stalking"	October 2, 2023	N/A
52	"Watchful Eye"	October 3, 2023	N/A
53	"In the Flesh"	October 4, 2023	N/A
54	"No Entry"	October 5, 2023	N/A
55	"Defy"	October 6, 2023	N/A
56	"Rightful Father"	October 9, 2023	N/A
57	"Desperate Rod"	October 10, 2023	N/A
58	"Defy"	October 11, 2023	N/A
59	"Hide N Seek"	October 12, 2023	N/A
60	"Fight 4 Life"	October 13, 2023	N/A
61	"Tell All"	October 16, 2023	N/A
62	"She’s Not Yours"	October 17, 2023	N/A
63	"The Chase"	October 18, 2023	N/A
64	"Dead Shot"	October 19, 2023	N/A
65	"The Last Kiss"	October 20, 2023	N/A
