= Beverly Salviejo =

Filipino singer, actress and comedian

- Born: October 18, 1956 (age 69); Ilocos, Philippines
- Occupations: Singer, actress, comedian
- Years active: 1986–present
- Height: 148 cm (4 ft 10 in)

Beverly Salviejo is a Filipino singer, actress and comedian.

== Career ==
Salviejo started out as a classical singer and stage actress. She rose to fame in the mid-1980s playing the loyal housekeeper in the hit sitcom Urbana at Feliza.

== Filmography ==
=== Film ===
| Year | Title | Role | Notes | Source |
|---|---|---|---|---|
| 1984 | Working Girls | Raul's Maid | | |
| 1984 | Baby Tsina | Prisoner | | |
| 1985 | Hello Lover, Goodbye Friend | Maid | | |
| 1985 | Till We Meet Again | Leleng | | |
| 1985 | Menudo at Pandesal | Mong Jr. | | |
| 1986 | Si Mister at Si Misis | Bettina | | |
| 1987 | Shoot That Ball | Cristina | | |
| 1987 | Maria Went to Town | Juling | | |
| 1988 | Taray at Teroy | Tiburcia Imburnal | | |
| 1988 | Rosa Mistica | | Segment "Mga Dilaw Na Rosas ni Rosario" | |
| 1988 | Kambal Tuko | Pinakbet/witch | | |
| 1988 | Good Morning Titser | | | |
| 1988 | I Love You 3x a Day | Poolside beauty | | |
| 1988 | Bakit Kinagat ni Adan ang Mansanas ni Eba? | Bronson | | |
| 1989 | Si Baleleng at ang Gintong Sirena | Delay | | |
| 1989 | Bondying: The Little Big Boy | Sepa | | |
| 1989 | Elvis and James: The Living Legends! (Buhay Pa... Mukhang Alamat Na!) | Miss King Gamot | | |
| 1989 | Estudyante Blues | Sauna Attendant | | |
| 1989 | Bilangin ang Bituin sa Langit | Connie | | |
| 1989 | Gawa Na ang Bala para sa Akin | Office mate | | |
| 1989 | First Lesson | | | |
| 1989 | Student Body | | | |
| 1990 | Tora-Tora, Bang Bang Bang | | | |
| 1990 | Naughty Boys | | | |
| 1990 | Dino Dinero | | | |
| 1990 | Tangga & Chos: Beauty Secret Agents | | | |
| 1991 | Katabi Ko'y Mamaw | Debbie | | |
| 1991 | Andrew Ford Medina ('Wag Kang Gamol!) | Girlie | | |
| 1991 | Tukso, Layuan Mo Ako! | Yaya | | |
| 1991 | Ang Totoong Buhay ni Pacita M. | | | |
| 1992 | Alabang Girls | Simang | | |
| 1992 | Mahirap Maging Pogi | Alibanbang Girl | | |
| 1992 | Working Students | Babes | | |
| 1993 | Ayaw ko nang Mangarap | | | |
| 1993 | Isang Linggong Pag-ibig | | | |
| 1994 | Bawal Na Gamot | | | |
| 1994 | Eat All You Can | | | |
| 1994 | Sana'y Laging Magkapiling | | | |
| 1994 | Muntik na Kitang Minahal | | | |
| 1994 | Manolo en Michelle: Hapi Together | | | |
| 1994 | Sana'y Laging Magkapiling | | | |
| 1994 | Muntik Na Kitang Minahal | | | |
| 1994 | Ang Pagbabalik ni Pedro Penduko | Tourist | | |
| 1995 | Alfredo Lim: Batas ng Maynila | Lim's Supporter | | |
| 1995 | Kirot II | | | |
| 1995 | Ang Tipo Kong Lalake (Maginoo pero Medyo Bastos) | Lovely | | |
| 1996 | Sariwa | | | |
| 1996 | Oki Doki Doc: The Movie | Musang Owner | | |
| 1996 | Takot Ka Ba sa Dilim? | Natalie | | |
| 1996 | Tukso, Layuan mo Ako 2 | | | |
| 1996 | Pipti-Pipti (1 Por U, 2 Por Me) | Ugly Hostess | | |
| 1996 | Halimuyak ng Babae | | | |
| 1997 | Sambahin ang Puri Ko | | | |
| 1997 | Ang Pinakamahabang Baba sa Balat ng Lupa | | | |
| 1997 | Takot Ako sa Darling Ko! | Gorya | | |
| 1997 | Hawakan Mo Ako | | | |
| 1997 | Exploitation | | | |
| 1998 | Haba-Baba-Doo! Puti-Puti-Poo! | Maid | | |
| 1998 | 'Tong Tatlong Tatay Kong Pakitong Kitong | OCW Applicant | | |
| 1999 | Anakan Mo Ako | | | |
| 1999 | Bayadra Brothers | | | |
| 1999 | Talong | | | |
| 1999 | Tik Tak Toys, My Kolokotoys | Hillary | | |
| 2009 | You Changed My Life | Manang Vida | | |
| 2009 | Last Supper No. 3 | Aling Suming | | |
| 2009 | Oh, My Girl!: A Laugh Story | Orphanage Volunteer | | |
| 2010 | Emir | Diday | | |
| 2010 | Father Jejemon | Marge | | |
| 2011 | Ligo Na Ü, Lapit Na Me | Ms. Literary criticism | | |
| 2012 | Bwakaw | Nitang | | |
| 2014 | Da Possessed | Belen Villamayor | | |
| 2016 | Love Is Blind | Apung Kring Kring | | |
| 2017 | Foolish Love | Corazon | | |
| 2017 | Our Mighty Yaya | Manang Bibing | | |
| 2017 | The Ghost Bride | Akoh | | |
| 2017 | Haunted Forest | Merly | | |
| 2018 | The Hopeful Romantic | Nanay Ming | | |
| 2018 | First Love | Martha | | |
| 2019 | Ang Sikreto ng Piso | | | |
| 2019 | Jesusa | Pavurata | | |
| 2021 | Eva | Vendor | | |
| 2022 | Maid in Malacañang | Felina "Biday" Consulta | | |
| 2023 | Martyr or Murderer | Felina "Biday" Consulta | | |
| 2023 | Tomacruz: Sa Puso ng Anak | Tekla | | |
| 2025 | The Rapists of Pepsi Paloma | Monica | | |

=== Television / digital series ===
| Year | Title | Role | Notes | Source |
|---|---|---|---|---|
| 2002 | G-mik | Tiya Mariana | | |
| 2006 | Komiks Presents: Agua Bendita | Kelly | | |
| 2006 | Debate with Mare at Pare | Herself | | |
| 2007 | Komiks Presents: Pedro Penduko at ang Mga Engkantao | Kelly | | |
| 2010 | Diva | Beth | | |
| 2010–2011 | Magkano ang Iyong Dangal? | Dioning | | |
| 2010 | Precious Hearts Romances Presents: Midnight Phantom | Yaya Zeny | | |
| 2010–2011 | Imortal | Dara | | |
| 2011–2012 | Ikaw ay Pag-Ibig | Ising | | |
| 2012 | Toda Max | Riannay | | |
| 2012 | Pintada | Minda | | |
| 2012–2013 | Princess and I | Anna Salamat | | |
| 2012 | A Beautiful Affair | Ason | | |
| 2012 | Enchanted Garden | Garita Consuelo | | |
| 2013 | My Little Juan | Teacher | | |
| 2013–2014 | Got to Believe | Tarantina | | |
| 2014–2015 | Forevermore | Margarita "Meg" Gomez | | |
| 2015–2016 | FPJ's Ang Probinsyano | Yaya Cita Roque | | |
| 2015 | The Ryzza Mae Show | Herself/Guest | | |
| 2017–2018 | Pusong Ligaw | Guadalupe "Guada" Epifania | | |
| 2018 | Inday Will Always Love You | Dixy | | |
| 2019 | Hanggang sa Dulo ng Buhay Ko | Vanessa "Vane" Espiritu | | |
| 2020 | Almost Paradise | Grandmother | | |
| 2022 | Daig Kayo ng Lola Ko | Lola Caring | Miniseries: "Lola Caring" | |
| 2023 | Family Feud | Herself/Guest Player | | |
| 2024 | Black Rider | Gorya† | | |
| 2024 | Pinoy Crime Stories | Ruby | | |
| 2025 | Maka | Myrna | | |
| 2025 | Magpakailanman | Norma | | |

== Awards and nominations ==
| Year | Work | Organization | Category | Result | Source |
|---|---|---|---|---|---|
| 2013 | | Aliw Awards | Best Stand-Up Comedian (Female) | Won | |
| 2013 | Library | Aliw Awards | Best Stand-Up Comedian | Won | |
| 2014 | | Aliw Awards | Best Female Crossover Award (Hall of Fame) | Won | |
| 2020 | | Aliw Awards | Best Female Crossover Award | Won | |
| 2021 | | Aliw Awards | Best Stand-Up Comedian (Hall of Fame) | Won | |
