= Marco Gumabao =

Filipino actor, model, athlete, entrepreneur (born 1994)

- Born: Marco Gabriel Imperial Gumabao; August 14, 1994 (age 32); Makati, Philippines
- Occupations: Actor; model; athlete; entrepreneur
- Years active: 2012–present
- Agent(s): Star Magic (2012–2017); Viva Artists Agency (2018–present)
- Height: 1.80 m (5 ft 11 in)
- Political party: NUP (2024–present)
- Parent(s): Dennis Roldan (father)
- Family: Michele Gumabao (sister); Paolo Gumabao (half-brother); Isabel Rivas (aunt); Gretchen Fullido (cousin); Barbie Imperial (cousin)

Marco Gabriel Imperial Gumabao (Tagalog pronunciation: [guˈmɐbaʊ]; born August 14, 1994) is a Filipino actor, model, athlete, and entrepreneur. He ran for the position as representative of Camarines Sur's fourth district last 2025 elections.

He is a model for the Philippine-based international clothing brand Bench's underwear and swimwear collection for men, under Bench/Body, for the company's spring-summer campaigns from 2017 to present.

== Early life and education ==
Marco, born August 14, 1994, in Makati, Metro Manila, the Philippines, is the fourth of five children to actor and politician Dennis Roldan and former It Girl Loli Imperial-Gumabao. He also has three half-siblings. Growing up, he competed in Muay Thai.

Gumabao attended the Ateneo de Manila High School and then De La Salle University as a psychology major. He also finished the Public administration course at the UP National College of Public Administration and Governance.

== Acting career ==
He first appeared in an uncredited role in Toda Max (2012), then rose in popularity in the TV series Luv U, both in the same period (2012–2016).

Gumabao also starred in supporting roles in numerous films such as She's Dating the Gangster (2014), Just the Way You Are (2015), and several other projects. He had special participation in popular television series Forevermore (2014–15), Pusong Ligaw (2017–18), and Ang Probinsyano (2017).

In 2017, Gumabao left Star Magic agency after five years of being under their management, and signed a new contract with Viva Artists Agency on September 4, 2018, together with his siblings Michele Gumabao and Kat Gumabao. He announced his freelance status after making an appearance in GMA News and Public Affairs' public service anthology series, Wish Ko Lang!, but is mostly on ABS-CBN.

After being launched in his first major lead role in Para sa Broken Hearted (2018), he also starred in hit TV series Precious Hearts Romances Presents: Los Bastardos.

Following a supporting role in the 2018 Metro Manila Film Festival entry Aurora, he appeared in the film Ulan in 2019.

== Modeling career ==
In 2017, Gumabao was announced as lead model for Bench/Body. His underwear endorsements, commercials, and campaigns under Bench revamped his image as a sexy and bankable actor and talent.

Since then, he has appeared in various magazines and publications, including Garage Magazine’s June–July 2018 Body Issue. He was also awarded the 2018 MEGA Man Best Bodies.

== Political career ==
In October 2024, he filed his candidacy for representative of the fourth district of Camarines Sur under the National Unity Party slate of the Villafuerte clan in the 2025 Philippine House election, but lost to incumbent Arnulf Fuentebella.

== Personal life ==
Gumabao has been in a relationship with Cristine Reyes since 2023. He is affiliated with the Christian group, Favor Church Manila.

== Filmography ==
=== Film ===
Year	Title	Role
2014	She's Dating The Gangster	Young Stephen
2015	Just The Way You Are	Skye
2016	Love Me Tomorrow	Carlos
2018	Abay Babes	Rocky
2018	Para sa Broken Hearted	RJ
2018	Aurora	Ricky
2019	Apple of My Eye	Michael
2019	Ulan	Andrew
2019	Just a Stranger	Jericho / Jekjek
2020	Hindi Tayo Pwede	Dennis
2021	Revirginized	Morph / Pawi
2022	Bahay na Pula	Roger
2023	Martyr or Murderer	young Ferdinand Marcos
2023	Baby Boy, Baby Girl	Seb
2026	Pasakalye	Gerardo

=== Television ===
Year	Title	Role	Ref.
2012	Toda Max	Marco Ugoy-Ugoy	
2012–2016	Luv U	JB Arellano	
2013	Kailangan Ko'y Ikaw	Ian Velasquez	
2013	Wansapanataym: Moomoo Knows Best	Arnel	
2013–2026	ASAP	Himself / Performer	
2014	Ipaglaban Mo: Hustisya Para Sa'yo, Anak	Angelo	
2014–2015	Forevermore	JC	
2015	Ipaglaban Mo: Pinaasa Mo Ako	Martin	
2015–2016	Ningning	Pido Cruz	
2016	Tubig at Langis	Christopher "Tope" Nieves Magdangal	
2016	Magpahanggang Wakas	Zachary "Zach" Flores	
2016	Ipaglaban Mo: Bulag	Rogelio	
2017	FPJ's Ang Probinsyano	Jose Rafael "Joel" T. Olegario	
2017	Ipaglaban Mo: Laro	Andre	
2017	Ipaglaban Mo: Pikot	Ernesto	
2017	Wish Ko Lang: Iskolar	Aaron	
2017–2018	Pusong Ligaw	Nathan Ruiz	
2017–2018	Hanggang Saan	Archie	
2018	Wish Ko Lang: Prodigal Son	Ferdy	
2018	Ipaglaban Mo: Ganti	Larry Ramos	
2018–2019	Precious Hearts Romances Presents: Los Bastardos	Matteo Silverio-Cardinal	
2021	Di Na Muli	Mico Emmanuel	
2021	Parang Kayo Pero Hindi	Robi	
2022	The Girl He Never Noticed	Eros Petrakis	
2023	Kurdapya	Carlos	
2023	Minsan pa Nating Hagkan ang Nakaraan	Rod Herrera	
2023	E.A.T.	Himself / Guest with Cristine Reyes	
2026	Viva One Originals: Balik Eskwela		
2026	Tubig to Handle: What the Fun!	Himself	

== Electoral history ==
2025 Philippine House of Representatives elections
Party	Candidate	Votes	%
NPC	Arnulf Bryan Fuentebella	144,731	56.11
NUP	Marco Gabriel Gumabao	113,229	43.89
Total votes		257,960	100
NPC hold			
