= Pusong Ligaw =

2017 Philippine television drama series

- Title card
- Also known as: Lost Hearts
- Genre: Melodrama; Romance; Family; Comedy
- Created by: Henry King Quitain; Jay Fernando
- Written by: Jerome Co; Ronalisa Co; Maan Dimaculangan-Fampulme; Reign Loleng
- Directed by: Garry Fernando; Elfren Vibar; Henry King Quitain; GB Sampedro; Ian Loreños
- Creative director: Olivia M. Lamasan
- Starring: Beauty Gonzalez; Bianca King; Sofia Andres; Diego Loyzaga; Enzo Pineda; Joem Bascon; Raymond Bagatsing
- Opening theme: "Pusong Ligaw" by Jona
- Composers: Jericho Rosales; Augusto Elizalde, Jr.
- Country of origin: Philippines
- Original language: Tagalog
- No. of episodes: 189

Production
- Executive producers: Carlo Katigbak; Cory Vidanes; Laurenti Dyogi; Malou Santos; Des De Guzman
- Producers: Ronald L. Faina; Myleen H. Ongkiko
- Production locations: Metro Manila, Philippines; Batac, Ilocos Norte, Philippines; Baguio, Philippines
- Editor: Shyra Joaquin
- Running time: 29–37 minutes
- Production company: Star Creatives

Original release
- Network: ABS-CBN
- Release: April 24, 2017 – January 12, 2018

Pusong Ligaw (International title: Lost Hearts / transl. the misguided heart) is a Philippine television drama series broadcast by ABS-CBN. Directed by Garry Fernando, Elfren Vibar, Henry King Quitain, GB Sampedro and Ian Loreños, it stars Beauty Gonzalez, Bianca King, Sofia Andres, Diego Loyzaga, Enzo Pineda, Joem Bascon and Raymond Bagatsing. It aired on the network's Kapamilya Gold line up and worldwide on TFC from April 24, 2017 to January 12, 2018.

== Plot ==
Pusong Ligaw is a classic story about friendship, love, and dreams. Two women, Tessa/Teri and Marga are bound by a promise to keep their friendship forever. This fictional drama follows them through the disintegration of their friendship, the tragedy in their lives and their children's, and their reconciliation.

They both come from poor families but Tessa/Teri and Marga always support each other as they face their issues, struggles, challenges, as well as the happy experiences of their youth. Their bond is tested when Caloy enters their lives. Caloy has a historical relationship with Marga, but she prefers to keep it platonic. He meets Tessa/Teri and they fall in love. Marga changes her mind about Caloy and decides she can win him back. As Tessa/Teri pursues her dream of becoming a fashion designer, Caloy gets jealous of Tessa's/Teri's mentor, the wealthy and influential Jaime Laurel, owner of a fashion conglomerate in Asia and America, who invites Tessa/Teri to one of his events. Marga uses Caloy's jealousy to undermine his faith in Tessa/Teri, and in one drunken evening, they spend the night together.

Tessa/Teri finds them together the next morning and is distraught. Shattered and broken over the betrayal of both friends, she leaves Caloy and returns to her home in the province. She discovers she is pregnant and her mother banishes her from their home. Tessa/Teri moves to Manila alone and supports herself. She gives birth to a boy, Rafael, and struggles to earn a living as a seamstress in Divisoria. Her life further destructs when her baby is kidnapped by a woman known by authorities for kidnapping and selling babies. Unable to find her son, Tessa/Teri is distraught and out of her mind when Jaime Laurel finds her and takes care of her. Years later, they get married. Although Tessa/Teri never stops looking for her son, she adopts a street urchin and calls him Rafa.

Caloy is heartbroken over losing Tessa. He returns to school and completes his engineering degree. He leaves to work abroad with an international shipping company, saving a substantial amount of money when he returns. He opens a business servicing companies and retail establishments requiring mechanical repairs of tools and mechanical equipment. He does very well, and is able to build a large house, and continues to support orphans with building their job skills to keep them off the streets.

Marga becomes a successful entrepreneur, her talent agency becomes one of the biggest in the Philippines. She runs into Caloy and the two resume their friendship and eventually become a couple.

Tessa/Teri goes on to fulfill her dream to become a fashion designer, and with the help of Jaime, she opens a fashion couture house in the U.S. called House of Teri. They return to Manila when Jaime feels Tessa/Teri is ready to launch her ready-to-wear brand in the Philippine market.

The lives of the three friends collide at the House of Teri launch. But instead of renewing old friendship and forgiving past mistakes, they thread down a path of jealousy, revenge, and obsession: this time including Jaime Laurel, the one person most affected by their history.

At the near end of the series, it is revealed that Jaime was responsible for murdering his adopted son Rafa and a master manipulator of the events so far. Tessa/Teri and Caloy discover the DNA results revealing Miraculo Policarpio as their biological son Rafael Magbanua Cervantes, and Jaime manipulates Tessa for blaming her real son for the crime he did not commit. He stages a car accident while he was sought by the authorities and barely survives the car crash. Due to his mental instability, he kidnaps Marga's son as a bait to get Tessa/Teri, which succeeds until the arrival of Caloy, Marga, and the authorities to rescue them. Eventually, to pay back what Marga has done to her best friend, she sacrifices herself to rescue Tessa/Teri from getting shot by Jaime until he was neutralized by the authorities.

After Marga's death due to not surviving at the hospital from her gunshot wounds by Jaime, Leon serves life imprisonment for working with Jaime to plan Rafa’s murder. Jaime is sent to the mental asylum after surviving the gunshot wound by the authorities. Tessa/Teri becomes the owner and entrepreneur of House of Teri (now renamed House of Tessa) where she shows a tribute of the fashion models wearing the dress designs made by the late Marga, as their dreams from their youth have finally come true, all while being supported by Caloy, Potpot/Ira, and Vida.

== Cast and characters ==
=== Main cast ===
- Beauty Gonzalez as Teresa "Tessa" Magbanua Cervantes / Teri Laurel
- Bianca King as Margaret "Marga" Dimaawa
- Sofia Andres as Vida Verdadero
- Diego Loyzaga as Miraculo "Potpot/Ira" Policarpio / Rafael Magbanua Cervantes
- Enzo Pineda as Rafael "Rafa" M. Laurel
- Joem Bascon as Carlito "Caloy" Cervantes
- Raymond Bagatsing as Jaime Laurel

=== Supporting cast ===
- Albie Casiño as Leon Del Mundo
- Atoy Co as Danilo "Danny" Magbanua
- Smokey Manaloto as Melchor Policarpio
- Almira Muhlach as Didith Policarpio
- Maureen Mauricio as Rowena Magbanua
- Shalala Reyes as Asiong "Tita Asya" Salonga
- Vangie Labalan as Gabriella "Lolay" Policarpio
- Beverly Salviejo as Guadalupe "Gauda" Epifania
- Rhed Bustamante as Melanie "Melai" Policarpio
- Ysabel Ortega as Charlotte Quiñones
- Maricar de Mesa as Amanda Yulo
- Helga Krapf as Patrice
- Madeleine Humphries as Lauren

=== Guest cast ===
- IC Mendoza as Vinny
- Jojit Lorenzo as Lito
- Tart Carlos as Noemi
- Air Lajada as Arvin
- Marnie Lapuz as Luz
- Emman Nimedez as Tisoy
- Ricci Chan as Alex
- Hiyasmin Neri as Andrea
- Trina "Hopia" Legaspi as Kitty
- Michael Rivero
- Erin Ocampo as Cynthia
- Luis Hontiveros as Lance
- Benedict Campos as Sandro
- John Matthew Uy as Mike
- Chienna Filomeno as Shane
- Nikki Gonzales
- Igi Boy Flores
- Dawn Chang as Janine
- Franchesca Floirendo
- Marinella Sevidal
- Angelo Alayon as JR
- Josef Elizalde
- Ethyl Osorio
- Wilmer Abulencia as Buknoy
- Alex Calleja
- Jong Cuenco as Father Julian
- Cora Waddell as Kayla Benoit
- Lilygem Yulores
- Chun Sa Jung
- Clint Bondad as Simon
- Manuel Chua as Marcus
- Eslove Briones
- Alchris Galura
- CX Navarro as young Potpot
- Sophia Reola as young Vida
- Ahwel Paz

=== Special participation ===
- Teresa Loyzaga as Olivia Montero
- Alma Moreno as Alma Morena
- Miriam Quiambao as Monique de la Cuesta-Laurel
- Nikka Valencia as Clarissa Dimaawa
- Justin Cuyugan as Emil Verdadero
- Loren Burgos as Ximena Vergara
- Vivo Ouano as Edward Jacobs
- Troy Montero as Chris Ruiz
- Nina Ricci Alagao as Donna Bella
- Johnny Revilla as Paul Enriquez
- Toby Alejar as Donato Antonio
- Marco Gumabao as Nathan Ruiz
- Solenn Hesusaff as Vicky Hernandez
- Bea Alonzo as Mel Villania
- Liza Soberano as Lieky Fernandez
- Enrique Gil as Owen Enriquez

== Ratings ==
Kantar Media National TV Ratings (3:20PM PST)
Pilot Episode	Finale Episode	Peak	Average
18.2% April 24, 2017	22.0% January 12, 2018	22.0% January 12, 2018	TBD

== Production ==
Timeslot changes

Following The Greatest Love's conclusion, the show became Kapamilya Gold's leadoff teleserye, and ABS-CBN decided to move The Better Half to 4:15 PM which was previously occupied by Pusong Ligaw's predecessor.

== Broadcast ==
Pusong Ligaw premiered on April 24, 2017.

=== Re-runs ===
The show aired re-runs on Jeepney TV from April 23 to December 7, 2018; February 1 to July 30, 2021; May 29 to October 6, 2023; and July 21, 2025 to April 10, 2026 that also aired on ALLTV.

== See also ==
- List of programs broadcast by ABS-CBN
- List of ABS-CBN Studios original drama series
- List of programs broadcast by Jeepney TV
- Kadenang Ginto
