= Marion Aunor =

Filipino actress and singer (born 1992)

- Born: Marion Louise Aunor; April 10, 1992 (age 34)
- Origin: Manila, Philippines
- Genres: OPM, pop
- Occupations: Singer-songwriter, pianist
- Instruments: vocals. piano
- Years active: 2013–present
- Labels: Star Music (2013–2017); Viva Records (2018–present)

Marion Louise Aunor is a Filipino singer, songwriter, host, film actress, music producer, film composer and label head.

== Early career ==
She began her career after winning third place in the 2013 Himig Handog. Aunor is a former contract recording artist for Star Music, and is now under Viva Records. She is also the niece of actress and singer Nora Aunor.

== Current career ==
Aunor made her debut in February 2013 with an original song called "If You Ever Change Your Mind", which was also written by her. Her song was one of the twelve finalists selected from the 2,500 songs from the auditions. The song won as the third place in the 2013 Himig Handog P-Pop Love Songs. On 7 March 2013, Aunor signed a contract with Star Music as its recording artist. Vehnee Saturno became her manager. Aunor was part of the Middle East Leg of the World Tour of the Philippine daytime television series Be Careful with My Heart. On 3 May 2013, her song entry "Do, Do, Do" was chosen as one of the twelve finalists for the second Philippine Popular Music Festival. However she later decided to withdraw from the competition due to her talent management's decision. Her self-titled album was eventually released on 4 July. In 2014, Aunor became one of the finalists in the Myx VJ Search. Aunor was chosen to interpret one of the finalist song at the 2014 Himig Handog. The song was entitled 'Pumapag-ibig' and was written by Jungee Marcelo. She performed the song with Rizza Cabrera and Seed Bunye at the finals night of the Himig Handog on 28 September 2014.

On 3 September 2015, it was announced that she would be performing under the stage name of Marion, dropping her surname. She then released her second studio album, MARION, on 31 August. The album tracks "Wanna Be Bad" and the cover song "I Love You Always Forever" were featured on the movie Ex with Benefits. She also wrote the carrier-single "You Don't Know Me" for the debut album of actress Kathryn Bernardo.

On 13 February 2018, she signed a new management under Viva Artists Agency for Viva Records and began releasing music under her full name. On February 7, 2020, she released the single "Mahal Kita Ngayon", under the name Marione.

In 2022, Aunor alongside her sister Ashley provided the music for the controversial Darryl Yap films Maid in Malacañang and its sequel Martyr or Murderer which depicted the legacy of Philippine dictator Ferdinand Marcos as a hero.

== Movie actress ==
Following the footsteps of her aunt the late singer turned actress Nora Aunor, Marion also ventured into acting in films. Marion's first movie was a cameo appearance in a romantic movie, The Breakup Playlist in 2015, which stars Piolo Pascual & singer turned actress Sarah Geronimo-Guidicelli. Her follow up movie was Tibak, directed by Arlyn Dela Cruz in 2016. 5 years later, she also starred in her next movie Kaka which was released in 2021. It also stars It's Showtime hosts Ion "Kuya Escort" Perez, and Jackie "Ate Girl" Gonzaga (Jackie's debut movie). Her most recent new movie, Revirginized was released in 2021, with co-star Sharon Cuneta, Rosanna Roses, former Tacloban Mayor Christina Gonzales, Albert Martinez, Abby Bautista & Marco Gumabao.

== Discography ==
=== Studio albums ===
List of albums with relevant details
Title	Album Details
Marion Aunor	Released: 4 July 2013; Label: Star Music; Format: CD, digital download
MARION	Released: 31 August 2015; Label: Star Music; Format: CD, digital download

== Singles ==
- Wanna Be Bad (2015, original soundtrack from the film, "Ex With Benefits")
- I Love You Always & Forever (2015, Original by Donna Lewis & also used from the soundtrack from the movie, "Ex With Benefits")
- Mahal Kita Ngayon (2020)
- Do, Do, Do (a song finalist in the PhilPop Song Festival 2013)
- Pumapag-Ibig (a song finalist in the Himig Handog P Pop Love Songs 2014)
- Pusuan (2025)

== Filmography ==
=== Television ===
Year	Title	Role	Notes
2013	ASAP Natin To!	Herself	
2016	We Love OPM	Contestant	Member of "Power Chords" with Marlo Mortel and Kaye Cal
2018	Unang Hirit	Herself / guest	
2022	Masked Singer Pilipinas 2	Player	4th placer

=== Film ===
Year	Title	Role	Ref.
2025	100 Awit Para Kay Stella	Fidel's Manager	
2021	Sarap Mong Patayin	Nirvana	
2021	Revirginized	Liz	
2021	Kaka	Herself	
2016	Tibak		
2015	The Breakup Playlist		

=== Web series ===
- Pusuan or Laruan with Marion Aunor

== See also ==
- Original Pilipino Music
