= Darryl Yap =

Filipino film director (born 1987)

- Born: Darryl Ray Spyke Balingit Yap; January 7, 1987 (age 39); Olongapo, Zambales, Philippines
- Education: Centro Escolar University; Nanyang Technological University
- Occupations: Director; producer; screenwriter
- Years active: 2017–present

Darryl Ray Spyke Balingit Yap (born January 7, 1987) is a Filipino film director, screenwriter and producer.

== Early life and education ==
Yap was born on January 7, 1987 in Olongapo, Zambales to his parents who are high school teachers. He has a sibling.

He graduated in Manila's Centro Escolar University with a mass communication degree and later enrolled at the Nanyang Technological University in Singapore to pursue a degree in public administration.

== Career ==
Yap started his directing career with the short film Squatterina that highlighted the similarities between a typical illegal settler in Olongapo and the disciplines of ballet. It was followed by his first full film #Jowable in 2018 which is about a troubled young woman named Elsa (starring Kim Molina) who yearns for a mature and intimate relationship. The film gained mixed reviews from critics.

In May 2020, Yap released a television series entitled Sakristan about two men coming to terms in finding love despite being church servants. He received widespread criticism before the series' release due to the nature of the title and posters. There were online demands to cancel Sakristan due to its disrespectful and offensive content to the Catholic Church. The series was released through YouTube.

In January 2021, Viva Films released Paglaki Ko, Gusto Kong Maging Pornstar, directed and written by Yap. It tells the story of a group of former pornstars gathered to teach an aspiring teen actress on how to be a pornstar, with a cash reward should the actress be launched. The film was prohibited to be shown to the general public by the Movie and Television Review and Classification Board (MTRCB) due to its sexual and explicit content. A sequel titled Pornstar 2: Pangalawang Putok was released on December 3, 2021, on Vivamax.

In July 2021, Yap released another film entitled Gluta, about an Aeta girl who dreams of winning the Miss Universe pageant but faces discrimination from her own indigenous community. In August 2021, Yap also released an erotic comedy film, Revirginized, about a mother (played by Sharon Cuneta) who never had a proper coming of age experience.

Yap was declared persona non grata in June 2022 by the Quezon City Council for an episode of VinCentiments where the Seal of Quezon City was defaced and actress-comedian Ai-Ai delas Alas portrayed as Quezon City mayor Joy Belmonte in a negative way.

The period historical revisionist drama film Maid in Malacañang was written and directed by Yap, and tells the story of the Marcos family's last three days in the Malacañang Palace before they were forced to flee to Hawaii during the People Power Revolution in 1986. The film released in July 2025 received numerous negative reviews from critics and audiences due to its controversial portrayal of the Marcos family and of People Power Revolution figurehead Corazon Aquino. A second installment film Martyr or Murderer was released in 2023.

In 2024, Yap released a romantic comedy film, titled Seoulmeyt, about a Filipina fan of Korean dramas meets with the man of her dreams until she discovers his fake personality. Starring Kim Molina and Jerald Napoles, and also shot in South Korea, the film received positive reviews.

In October 2024, it was reported that Yap is planning to do an upcoming movie about the late Filipino actress Pepsi Paloma. The film hinted to revolve around Paloma's alleged rape and subsequent suicide was entitled The Rapists of Pepsi Paloma and was set to be screened in February 5, 2025 before its release was halted by a court order. Vic Sotto, one of the alleged suspect of the abandoned rape case, filed libel charges against Yap for the unreleased film shortly after the trailer's release in January 2025.

After the averted screening of Pepsi Paloma, Yap started working on the film Ngongo. The film already received criticism from the Department of Social Welfare and Development and the National Council on Disability Affairs for its title and promotional materials which had execution which they deem deragatory towards people with disabilities.

== Personal life ==
Yap is a bakla or a gay man. He came out in his college years when he had a boyfriend for five years. Yap admitted to being in a straight relationship during high school and recalled how his mother opposed him having a girlfriend, already suspecting he was gay.

== Sexual assault and pedophilia claims ==
In 2020, Yap drew controversy for his film Ayudamn, which was condemned on social media for having an offensive remark to single parents. A social media user posted a thread showing supposed screenshots of grooming him when he was 16 years old. The user also claimed that Yap's videographer Vincent Asis also had relationships with minors.

Yap responded to the claim with a similar thread of screenshots, claiming that during the conversations, the user was allegedly telling him that he was a rape victim. He stated that the user had edited and manipulated the screenshots to maliciously portray him as a child groomer.

A Facebook user also accused Yap of perpetuating pedophilia and child abuse amidst the lockdown put in place due to the COVID-19 pandemic. Yap threatened to file legal complaints against the Facebook user for spreading false information, asserting that he is not a pedophile nor has abused children.

Yap also drew backlash for an old tweet in 2017 which he stated "masarap ang bata" (lit. 'Children are delicious'). Among them was former Commission on Elections commissioner Rowena Guanzon, who called on the public to boycott Yap's movies and report him to his films' financiers.

== Filmography ==
=== Feature films ===
Table featuring films directed by Darryl Yap
Year	Title	Director	Writer	Producer	Genre
2019	Jowable	Yes	Yes	No	Comedy
2021	Paglaki Ko, Gusto Kong Maging Pornstar	Yes	Yes	No	Comedy
2021	Tililing	Yes	Yes	No	Comedy
2021	Ang Babaeng Walang Pakiramdam	Yes	Yes	No	Comedy
2021	Gluta	Yes	Yes	No	Drama
2021	Revirginized	Yes	Yes	No	Comedy
2021	69+1	Yes	Yes	No	Comedy
2021	Ang Manananggal na Nahahati ang Puso	Yes	Yes	No	Comedy
2021	Sarap Mong Patayin	Yes	Yes	No	Comedy
2021	Barumbadings	Yes	Yes	No	Action comedy
2021	Pornstar 2: Pangalawang Putok	Yes	Yes	No	Comedy
2022	Maid in Malacañang	Yes	Yes	No	Political drama
2023	Martyr or Murderer	Yes	Yes	No	Political drama
2024	Seoulmeyt	Yes	Yes	No	Romantic comedy
2026	Love Ngo	Yes	Yes	No	Comedy
Unreleased	The Rapists of Pepsi Paloma	Yes	Yes	Yes	Crime drama

=== Television series ===
Table featuring television series directed by Darryl Yap
Year	Title	Director	Writer	Producer	Genre
2020	Sakristan	Yes	Yes	No	BL drama
2021	Kung Pwede Lang (KPL)	Yes	Yes	No	comedy
