= Paglaki Ko, Gusto Kong Maging Pornstar =

2021 Philippine sex comedy-drama film by Darryl Yap

- Official release poster
- Directed by: Darryl Yap
- Written by: Darryl Yap
- Starring: Alma Moreno; Rosanna Roces; Ara Mina; Maui Taylor
- Cinematography: Rain Yamson II
- Edited by: Vincent Asis
- Production companies: Viva Films; VinCentiments
- Distributed by: Vivamax
- Release date: January 29, 2021
- Running time: 92 minutes
- Country: Philippines
- Language: Filipino

Paglaki Ko, Gusto Kong Maging Pornstar (transl. When I Grow Up, I Want to be a Pornstar) is a 2021 Philippine comedy-drama film starring Alma Moreno, Rosanna Roces, Ara Mina and Maui Taylor. The film was written and directed by Darryl Yap and edited by Vincent Asis. It premiered on January 29, 2021, through Vivamax.

This is the second film written and directed by Darryl Yap for Viva Films, after his feature-length debut #Jowable (2019) became a success.

== Plot ==
A group of former porn stars gathered to teach aspiring teen actress to be a porn star and will receive cash each if the actress will be launched.

== Cast ==
- Alma Moreno as Alma
- Rosanna Roces as Osang
- Ara Mina as Ara
- Maui Taylor as Maui
- AJ Raval as Twinkle
- Ana Jalandoni as Agatha
- Rose Van Ginkel as Sofia
- Kianna Milla as young Twinkle
- Billy Jake Cortez
- Loren Mariñas
- Clifford Pusing
- Henry Villanueva

== Production and release ==
Yap said that they started to shoot in early August and he also added that film scenes were taken in Subic and Olongapo for two weeks while implementing Alert Rules in the National Capital Region because of the COVID-19 pandemic. The film was premiered on January 29, 2021, on Vivamax. This will serve as Daryl Yap's second movie project on Viva Films.

The Movie and Television Review and Classification Board (MTRCB) gave a rating of X, the first film to be issued the said rating since the controversial 2006 film To Live for the Masses, meaning this film is prohibited to be shown to the general public.

GMA Network acquired the rights to air the film for television release in 2023, with a sanitized version of the movie retitled as "Sexy Star".

== Sequel ==
A sequel titled Pornstar 2: Pangalawang Putok has been announced and was released on December 3, 2021, on Vivamax.
