= Historical distortion regarding Ferdinand Marcos =

Historical distortion regarding Ferdinand Marcos is a political phenomenon in the Philippines. Ferdinand Marcos was the country's president between 1965 and 1986. Distortion, falsification, or whitewashing of the historical record regarding this period, sometimes referred to using the phrases "historical denialism", "historical negationism", or "historical revisionism" as a euphemism for negationism, is an academically documented phenomenon linked to the return of Marcos' immediate family and political allies to government positions, as well as the hero's burial of Marcos himself in 2016. It continues Marcos' own efforts to create a cult of personality for himself, which in itself involved various forms of historical distortion.

Some of the earlier examples of distortion involved various instances of historical denialism by the remaining Marcos family members and their followers, which involved trivializing of the human rights violations and economic plunder that took place during the Marcos administration, as well as the role played by the Marcos children in the administration.

Into the 2020s, various studies have uncovered systematic disinformation campaigns run by top public relations firm executives, efforts to create a false impression of a scholarly body of pro-Marcos literature, and the systematic use of click armies and digital black ops to spread strategic disinformation on social media.

== Historical denialism ==
One prominent form of historical distortion regarding the Marcos administration is the denial or trivialization of its human rights violations and economic plunder, as well as the denial of the roles played by the rest of the Marcos family and by various Marcos cronies in the administration. False claims have been made both by members of the Marcos family and by associates such as former Defense Minister Juan Ponce Enrile.

=== By Marcos family members ===
Various Marcos family members who have stayed in the public eye since their return to the Philippines have denied the atrocities of the Marcos regime and have made various false claims regarding the dictatorship, such as assertions that the country was self-sufficient in rice and that the Philippines had the highest literacy rate in Asia.

==== By Bongbong Marcos ====
Bongbong Marcos, Marcos' son and namesake, has specifically been criticized for actively refusing to apologize for human rights violations and ill-gotten wealth during his father's administration. In several instances, Marcos Jr. brushed aside the issue of martial law atrocities, he specifically belittled or denied claims of Martial Law atrocities. Marcos used social media as a tool to distort history regarding his father's regime.

This includes a 2012 interview with Jackie Dent of The Sydney Morning Herald, where Dent recounts: "I put it to him that it has been documented that people were tortured, money was appropriated and a Hawaiian court has found against the family. He laughs. 'Well, that is one opinion and that is what the prosecutors would say,' he says." In the same year, Marcos dismissed calls for him to apologize for atrocities experienced by human rights abuses during his father's administration commemorated the 40th year of the proclamation of Martial Law, dismissing their calls as "self-serving statements by politicians, self-aggrandizement narratives, pompous declarations, and political posturing and propaganda."

During his 2016 campaign to become Vice President of the Philippines, he also attempted to dismiss the events, saying Filipinos should "leave history to the professors," prompting over 500 faculty, staff and history professors from Ateneo de Manila University to issue a statement condemning the act as part of "an ongoing willful distortion of our history," and a "shameless refusal to acknowledge the crimes of the Martial Law regime."

More than 1,400 Catholic Schools through the Catholic Educational Association of the Philippines (CEAP) later joined the call of the Ateneo faculty, followed by the Department of History of the University of the Philippines Diliman, which released a statement decrying what they called a "dangerous" effort for Marcos to create "myth and deception."

==== By Imee Marcos ====
Imee Marcos has also issued similar statements, which include her 2016 statement that she was "too young" to have any power during her father's administration (although she was already 30 years old when her father was ousted in February 1986), and her 2018 assertion that critics should just "move on" regarding the crimes and excesses of the martial law era.

=== By Marcos associates ===
On September 20, 2018, Marcos Jr. released a YouTube video depicting a "tête-à-tête" between him and Juan Ponce Enrile, in which Enrile made a number of claims denying the unlawful arrests and killings of critics during the Marcos administration. These were quickly refuted and denounced by martial law victims, including former Senate President Aquilino Pimentel Jr., former Social Welfare Secretary Judy Taguiwalo, former Commission on Human Rights chair Etta Rosales, and Palanca award-winning writer Boni Ilagan, among others. It was also denounced by families and friends of Martial Law victims, such as former President Noynoy Aquino, and former Senator Rene Saguisag.

Enrile eventually backpedalled from some of his claims, saying they were the products of "unlucid intervals," but continuing to claim that the extent of the atrocities was subject to debate.

=== Educational system ===
Under the Human Rights Victims Reparation and Recognition Act of 2013, the Department of Education (DepEd) and the Commission on Higher Education are mandated to teach human rights violations during the martial law dictatorship. However activists, history teachers, scholars, and students have noted a failure to teach the economic hardships, political repression, Marcos's plunder, and the murder and detention of victims during martial law.

History teachers noted how Philippine history was removed as a junior high school subject under the K-12 curriculum. Some observers such as Akbayan Youth have proposed the strengthening the educational system's teaching of martial law to address historical denialism.

Teachers, historians, sociologists, and journalists organized Tanggol Kasaysayan to address historical disinformation.

==== Textbooks ====
Philippine history textbooks might say little about martial law, exclude its abuses, or make false claims that extol life during the period. Youth group Anakbayan criticized the K-12 program as well as DepEd's Learning Resource Management and Development System for modules that glorified the dictatorship of Ferdinand Marcos.

In 2018, Senator Risa Hontiveros criticized the DepEd for the existence of textbooks that supposedly either praise martial law or "whitewash the atrocities committed during the Martial Law years". Hontiveros said that "DepEd must take a more proactive role in fulfilling the mandate of integrating Martial Law atrocities in our curriculum and ensuring that our instructional materials are factual, up-to-date and error-free".

In the House of Representatives, Deputy Minority Leader France Castro in 2023 criticized DepEd's order to revise textbooks to remove the term "Diktadurang Marcos" (Marcos dictatorship) and replace it with just "diktadura" (dictatorship). The Congress of Teachers/Educators for Nationalism and Democracy called the DepEd order an attempt to "rehabilitate the dark history of the Marcos family."

=== Institutions, monuments, and museums ===
Under the presidency of Bongbong Marcos, memorials, monuments, and institutions have been built or planned to honor Ferdinand Marcos and his dictatorship. Some of the memorials, including those that use public funds, are meant to support false narratives such as Ferdinand Marcos's dubious war record. In 2023, the Ferdinand E. Marcos Grandstand was constructed in Laoag, Ilocos Norte, using public funds controlled by the office of Representative Sandro Marcos.

In 2023, a memorial marker with the portrait of Ferdinand Marcos was built along the Pantabangan Dam in Nueva Ecija, while a new Memorial Plaza of Major Ferdinand E. Marcos is up for bidding for completion in 2025. In Silang, Cavite, a President Ferdinand E. Marcos Sr. Field will be built using funds from the Philippine National Police Academy and the Department of Public Works and Highways. The cost includes the construction of a large full-body portrait or relief of Ferdinand Marcos resembling "Christ on the crucifix," according to a Vera Files report.

In 2024, the Department of Human Settlements and Urban Development announced an order by Bongbong Marcos to construct a 150-hectare Marcos Park in Rizal province. There is also a Marcos Park within a public housing compound in Bacolod City.

In Manila and Paoay, there are museums and exhibits that use public funds to glorify Ferdinand Marcos. For example, the Teus Mansion has a museum of Philippine presidents, with the largest room dedicated to Ferdinand Marcos while all other presidents are in another room. The exhibit makes false claims about Marcos's bar exam scores and his reasons for declaring martial law and glosses over details of the Marcos family's ouster during the People Power Revolution. In Marikina, the Marikina Shoe Museum prominently displays photographs, paintings, and memorabilia of Imelda Marcos and gives a false impression of Imelda Marcos's contribution to the shoe industry.

== Organized disinformation efforts and use of troll accounts ==
In 2018, Dr. Jason Cabañes of the University of Leeds School of Media and Communication and Dr. Jonathan Corpus Ong of the University of Massachusetts Amherst released a study of organized disinformation efforts in the Philippines, titled "Architects of Networked Disinformation: Behind the Scenes of Troll Accounts and Fake News Production in the Philippines." Based on participant observation in Facebook community groups and Twitter accounts, as well as key informant interviews with 20 "disinformation architects," conducted from December 2016 to December 2017, the study described a "professionalized and hierarchized group of political operators who design disinformation campaigns, mobilize click armies, and execute innovative "digital black ops" and "signal scrambling" techniques for any interested political client." This network had "ad and PR strategists at the top."

The Ong and Cabañes study also described how techniques for "personal branding" were used to "tell a revisionist account of the 20-year Marcos regime as 'the golden age of the Philippines,'" using such tools as YouTube videos, "in a bid to restore the political luster of the Marcos family."

== Role in the Marcos burial ==
One of the revelations from the Ong and Cabañes' 2018 study was the existence of "Ilibing Na" ("Bury now") campaign designed to create public support for a hero's burial for Ferdinand Marcos using "diversionary tactics to elude allegations of human rights violations and corruption during the term of Ferdinand Marcos" and launching "digital black ops that targeted prominent critics" of the Marcoses, particularly vice president Leni Robredo.

== Role in Philippine elections ==
According to historian Francis Gealogo, President Bongbong Marcos relied on "mythmaking" and benefited from "historical distortion about his father's regime that presented false narratives about the past".

Philippine researchers said that "networked political manipulation" on social media played a role in the 2022 presidential elections. The study by the Philippine Media Monitoring Laboratory said that through Facebook, YouTube, and Twitter, "anti-democratic" actors were able to influence political discourse by mimicking survey organizations and news media.

== Studies on disinformation spread ==
A 2020 study from the University of the Philippines Diliman found that "the Marcoses, their loyalists, and their allies" had produced and reproduced disinformation for years, intending to create an impression that the propaganda had actually come from a reputable community of scholars.

A related study published that year by Vera Files found 119 claims about the Marcoses that had been debunked by various news organizations, and examined how they were distributed. Although a number of pro-Marcos propaganda "sourcebooks" had been published in 2000, the study found that about 72% of confirmed Marcos disinformation originated directly from social media, rather than print sources. Specifically, it found out that 21% of these were "distributed via social media" and "not attributable to pro-Marcos books"; 20% of them came from a person quoted by media, which cannot traced to a preexisting text; and about 31% were about recent events. Only about 15% could be traced to text in various propaganda books, while a remaining 13% consisted of "general claims."

Researchers from the University of the Philippines Third World Studies Center noted that after Bongbong Marcos announced in October 2021 his candidacy for the presidency, claims praising his father's regime increased significantly. In addition to spreading disinformation, pro-Marcos posts also vilified post-Marcos administrations by falsely claiming that the Philippine economy was better under Marcos. Most of the propaganda used photos and videos and were widely shared. Pro-Marcos propaganda are often spread through Facebook pages by self-proclaimed Marcos Sr. loyalists who support Bongbong Marcos. Among the celebrities who have helped amplify pro-Marcos disinformation are singer Richard Poon, comedian Isko Salvador, vlogger Tricia Arias and director Darryl Yap (director). Videos with false claims have also been spread by political party Katipunan ng Demokratikong Pilipino. Fact checks done by mainstream media tend to have limited effects partly due to distrust of the media sown by Juan Ponce Enrile, columnist Rigoberto "Bobi" Tiglao, officials of the National Task Force to End Local Communist Armed Conflict, and pro-administration bloggers.

== Propaganda narratives ==
Common propaganda approaches associated with Marcos-related historical distortion include:

- Exaggeration of the Marcos administration's achievements
- False dichotomies between Marcos and other presidents, notably the two Aquino presidents (Corazon Aquino and Benigno Aquino III)
- A narrative of a “hidden history” kept by a “biased” press
- Denial, belittling or justification of Martial Law abuses based on anti-communism, real or perceived.

== Historical distortion portrayed in media ==
Aside from films directly featuring the Marcos era itself, the theme of contemporary historical distortion regarding Ferdinand Marcos has been featured significantly in numerous films, including Philippine films Respeto, Citizen Jake, and ML.

A prominent international documentary on the same theme was Lauren Greenfield's The Kingmaker, which follows the events of Imelda Marcos' life, first exploring the time when the Marcoses were still in power, and then in the second half of the film, focusing on the political comeback of the Marcos family after Ferdinand Marcos had died, and highlighting the stories of those who had survived abuses during Martial Law. Greenfield's exploration characterizes Imelda Marcos as the documentary's unreliable narrator, but takes on what The New York Times calls a “dialectic” approach, allowing Imelda to literally tell her narrative and slowly introducing opposing viewpoints as the movie progresses.

Various universities in the Philippines have released various publications and have held numerous academic fora regarding the topic, referring to it as historical denialism, negationism, disinformation, or distortion.

== See also ==
- Historical negationism
- Fake news in the Philippines
- Post-truth politics
