= Tulad ng Dati =

- Theatrical poster
- Directed by: Mike Sandejas (Note: Credited as Michael Escareal Sandejas.)
- Written by: Mike Sandejas
- Produced by: Mike Sandejas
- Starring: Jett Pangan; JB Leonor; Francis Reyes; Buddy Zabala; Carlos Balcells; Ping Medina; Agot Isidro; Mylene Dizon; Zoe Sandejas
- Cinematography: Louie Quirino
- Edited by: Mikael Angelo Pestaño (Note: Credited as Mikael Angelo C. Pestaño.)
- Music by: Francis Reyes; Buddy Zabala
- Release dates: July 18, 2006 (Cínemalayà: Philippine Independent Film Festival); April 25, 2007
- Running time: 105 minutes
- Country: Philippines
- Languages: Filipino; English

Tulad ng Dati (Filipino, "Just Like Before") is a Philippine independent film released in 2006. Director Mike Sandejas, calls the film "an alternate reality musical drama". The film's plot revolves around the Filipino rock band the Dawn, and the film itself is part-documentary, part-fiction; an inadvertent tribute to the Dawn founding member and guitarist Teddy Diaz, who was murdered in 1988, shortly after the band achieved commercial success.

The film's title is taken from the band's ninth studio album of the same title, which was also released in 2006 but was not intended to serve as a soundtrack to the film.

== Plot ==
The Dawn achieves fame and success in the 1980s, but after the murder of founding member and guitarist Teddy Diaz and years of decline, the band is finding it hard to continue playing. Middle-aged vocalist Jett Pangan's house is burglarized and he is knocked unconscious, waking up later suffering from amnesia. All he can remember is that he is in his 20s, and that it is the peak of his band's success. Jett can't quite come to terms with his situation and he insists on living as his 1980s self.

== Cast ==
- Jett Pangan as himself
  - Denzel Garrovillas as young Jett
- JB Leonor as himself
- Francis Reyes as himself
- Buddy Zabala as himself
- Carlos Balcells as himself
- Ping Medina as Teddy Diaz
- Agot Isidro as Beth Pangan, Jett's wife
- Mylene Dizon as Katrina, Jett's ex-girlfriend
- Zoe Sandejas as Erica Pangan, Jett's daughter
  - Maxi Sandejas as young Erica
- Raffy Francisco as Ratty
- Nina Sandejas as VJ Nina
- Buko Raymundo as Buko Dan
- Philip Corpuz (Note: Credited as Flip Corpuz.) as Kendiman
- Edsel Ochoa as D-sel
- Aleth Dela Cruz (Note: Credited as Aleth de la Cruz.) as Jett's mother
- John Mitchell as Franco
- Ericka Villongco (Note: Credited as Erica Villongco.) as Kat's daughter
- Nanding Josef as Teddy's grandfather
- Deogracias Reyes (Note: Credited as Dr. Deogracias Reyes.) as Doctor

=== Cameo appearances ===
- Raimund Marasigan (Note: Credited as Raymund Marasigan.) (of Sandwich) as himself
- Karl Roy (of Kapatid) as himself
- Juan Tamad

Imago

- Aia de Leon
- Zach Lucero
- Myrene Academia
- Tim Cacho

Stonefree

- Miro Valera
- Benson Tanoja
- Regie Mangubat
- Relly Mangubat

TroubleSpots (Erica's Bandmate)

- Melsi Macantangay
- Monina Dumaual
- Tutti Tanchuling

Ratbunitata Groupies

- Samantha Silver
- Ecru de Assi
- Yellow Milano
- Brenda Brown
- Jackie Pink
- Kristel White
- Kate Maroon
- Thea Aquino (Note: Credited as Thea Peach Aquino.)

== Soundtrack ==
All tracks written and composed by The Dawn in order of appearances:

1. "Tulad ng Dati" ("Just Like Before")
  Courtesy: The Dawn Productions
2. "Change is Breaking Us Apart"
  Courtesy: The Dawn Productions
3. "Mad Game"
  Courtesy: The Dawn Productions
4. "Traffic"
  Courtesy: The Dawn Productions
5. "Love Will Set Us Free"
  Courtesy: The Dawn Productions
6. "Little Paradise"
  Courtesy: The Dawn Productions
7. "Salimpusa" ("Paper Tiger")
  Courtesy: The Dawn Productions
8. "Push Forward"
  Courtesy: The Dawn Productions
9. "Abot Kamay" ("Within Reach")
  Courtesy: The Dawn Productions
10. "Enveloped Ideas"
  Courtesy: The Dawn Productions
11. "Dreams"
  Courtesy: The Dawn Productions
12. "Harapin" ("To Face")
  Courtesy: The Dawn Productions
13. "Iisang Bangka" ("We Are in One Boat")
  Courtesy: The Dawn Productions
14. "Salamat" ("Thank You")
  Courtesy: The Dawn Productions
15. "Ikot" ("Turn")
  Artist: Stonefree
  Courtesy: Warner Music Philippines
16. "Kahit Ika'y Panaginip Lang" ("Even If You're Just a Dream")
  Artist: Agot Isidro and Jett Pangan
  Thru the efforts of: FILSCAP

== Competitions and awards ==
The film was a finalist in the full-length feature category of the 2006 Cinemalaya Philippine Independent Film Festival. Tulad ng Dati won Cinemalaya awards for "Best Editing" (Mikael Pestaño), "Best Film" and "Best Sound" (Ronald de Asis) in 2006, as well as Gawad Urian Awards for "Best Sound" (Ronald de Asis), "Best Actor" (Jett Pangan), "Best Music" (the Dawn, Francis Reyes and Buddy Zabala), "Best Supporting Actor" (Ping Medina) and "Best Supporting Actress" (Agot Isidro) in 2007. The film also competed in Korea's Pusan International Film Festival, and was also included in the official selection of the Hawaii International Film Festival.
