= Tulad Ng Dati =

Tulad ng Dati may refer to:

- Tulad ng Dati (album), an album by Filipino rock band The Dawn
- Tulad ng Dati (film), a 2006 Filipino independent film
