= Enveloped Ideas =

Enveloped Ideas may refer to:

- Enveloped Ideas, a tribute album
- Enveloped Ideas, a song by Filipino rock band The Dawn
