= Francis Reyes =

Filipino musician (born 1967)

Francis "Brew" Reyes
- Born: Francis Florentino Saludo Reyes; June 20, 1967 (age 59); Lipa City, Philippines
- Other names: Kiko, Francis Brew
- Presenting career
- Show: In the Raw
- Station: NU107 (1997–2010)
- Musical career
- Genres: Pinoy rock, alternative rock, experimental
- Instruments: Vocals, guitar, keyboards
- Member of: The Dawn
- Formerly of: Garlic, P.O.T., Afterimage, Project 1, Peso Movement, Joey Ayala, Lou Bonnevie

Francis Florentino Saludo Reyes (born June 20, 1967, in Lipa City, Batangas) is a Filipino musician. He is best known for being the guitarist for the Filipino rock band the Dawn. He was the chief radio announcer and musical director for the rock station NU107.5 FM who used the on-air stage name Francis Brew. He was also the editor of Billboard Philippines, which was launched in 2016.

== Early years ==
Reyes was born and raised in Lipa City, the second child of Florante Luz Reyes, a photographer, and Teresita Marquinez Saludo, a housewife. His youth was not particularly musical and his on-stage experiences were focused on oratorical contests which he regularly won. He started playing guitar at 14, helped by his elder brother Ferdinand who was a "natural" guitarist. The Reyeses were not rich, and his first proper guitar was a fake Gibson acoustic worth Php150.00 that his mother promised as a gift if he won a declamation contest during his junior high school year in De La Salle Lipa.

Although supported by his mother, Reyes' choice to pursue music or fine arts in university was not encouraged by the family so he majored in Political Science and minored in Literature at De La Salle University. Nevertheless, he continued to study music on his own, bringing an old Telecaster copy–a gift from an uncle in Canada–to school and practicing behind the university library. He formed a few bands with friends and played at school events. The school's prohibitive tuition fees plus the delicate financial status of his family at the time took their toll and he went looking for writing jobs to supplement his income. In 1987, he auditioned for an FM radio station and became a graveyard shift trainee but was eventually able to join NU107.

== Career ==
=== NU107 ===
At around the same time he joined NU107, he became a member of Afterimage, which was then managed by Martin Galan, who also managed the Dawn. When Reyes joined the Dawn, he was juggling school, NU107, and the band. When the schedule of the Dawn began to fill up, he became somewhat negligent with the radio station and was let go amicably in 1992. He returned in 1997 to host the show "In the Raw", and has been with the station since then. He eventually was appointed its chief announcer and musical director until NU107 went its final broadcast on November 7, 2010.

=== The Dawn ===
Reyes met the Dawn during his tenure with Afterimage, although he had already known Jett Pangan in university during interpretative reading contests which Pangan regularly won. He became friendly with the group's guitarist/founder Teddy Diaz and they even spoke of forming a thrash metal side project with drummer JB Leonor's brother Dennis. Unfortunately, Teddy was murdered mere days after their talk. Reyes was then asked to be one of the three guitarists who were to play Teddy's parts in the tribute concert "Salamat Teddy" at the Folk Arts Theater in September 1988.

Reyes returned to Afterimage during Atsushi Matsuura's tenure with the Dawn and also became one of band's roadies. In November 1989, he was asked to replace Matsuura.

Reyes recorded three albums and played with the Dawn until January 1995 when the band decided to go on hiatus. Between then and until the band reformed, he became a session guitarist for Lou Bonnevie, Kulay, P.O.T., and Joey Ayala. He credits his experience with The Dawn and their eclectic music for being able to play in different genres comfortably.

The Dawn reformed with Atsushi Matsuura in 1999, thus expanding the line-up to a five-piece. When Matsuura parted ways with the band in 2004, Reyes became the sole guitarist.

On April 16, 2009, Francis left the band after what Jett Pangan called a "hard meeting". Pangan went on to state though that Reyes is welcome to rejoin the band.

Reyes, along with bassist Carlos Balcells returned to the band on June 7, 2016, thus the band became a quintet once again.

=== Solo work and current projects ===
Reyes is also currently a contractual music arranger for the Roadrunner Network. He recently contributed a piece for the compilation album Mga Gitarista under 12Stone Records. Although constantly encouraged by peers to create a guitar-oriented solo album, Reyes is not interested, preferring to focus his energies on the Dawn.

He formed the improvisation-oriented trio Garlic with Razorback bassist Louie Talan and Imago drummer Zach Lucero (also an NU107 alumnus) in 1998. Although the group garnered some critical accolades, they have yet to record an album.

He was part of Helenovela with former Orange and Lemons frontman Mcoy Fundales, now with KENYO and PESO Movement with Japs Sergio (ex-Rivermaya), drummer Kurt Floresca and former Jet Pangan Group bassist Macky Macaventa who is now with True Faith.

Reyes was also a part of the supergroup, Project 1.

=== Billboard Philippines ===
In 2016, Reyes became the editor-in-chief of Billboard Philippines, a brand dedicated to music news, charts and other related services. He later abolished it in January 2018, but the brand was relaunched in October 2023 under a new management where he became the editor-at-large.

== Musical influences ==
Reyes credits Ritchie Blackmore's solo on the intro to Deep Purple's "Speed King" as the moment when he decided he wanted to be a guitarist, although he was an obsessive Queen/Brian May fan as well. His early heroes included Eddie Van Halen and Gary Moore, and actually put electrical tape on his Telecaster copy à la Van Halen. His current influences are Pat Metheny, Eric Johnson, Robert Fripp, Allan Holdsworth, David Torn, Adrian Belew, Matt Bellamy, Jonny Greenwood, Ed O'Brien, Nels Cline, and Jimi Hendrix.

== Equipment used ==
=== Electric guitars ===
Reyes used to be an endorser for Hamer Guitars. He used the Hamer Standard XT and Vector XT models.

His other guitars used to include a Squier Standard Telecaster, a Gretsch 5235T Pro Jet, a Dame Mind 505, and a pre-lawsuit Yamaha Lord Player which he all sold. Now he mainly uses guitars from Lyric Music Stores which he is also a part of. He has been playing Tokai Guitars, a Yamaha Revstar and a PRS Tremonti Custom SE of late.

He also still has the Casio PG380 guitar synthesizer used during his first two years with the Dawn.

=== Amplifiers ===
- Vox Valvetronix AD50VT

=== Effects pedals ===
- Digitech Brian May Red Special
- Z Vex Fuzz Factory
- Zoom G9.2tt (for pitch shift, modulation, and delays)
- Line 6 DL4 (for on-the-fly sampling)
- Korg Kaoss Pad KP3 (for sampling and spontaneous textures)

=== Keyboards ===
- E-mu XK6
- Korg EA-1 Electribe
- Yamaha vintage Monophonic synthesizer

=== Other equipment ===
Reyes also has a Vietnamese dan tranh, a Xaphoon pocket sax, and assorted small instruments such as a kalimba and tin whistle, all subtly used in the Dawn's recordings.

== Filmography ==
=== Television ===
Year	Title	Role	Notes	Ref.
1994	1st NU Rock Awards	Himself / Performer (with The Dawn)		
1997	SOP	Himself / Guest Performer (with The Dawn)		
2007	The ARAW Values Advertising Awards	Himself / Guest Performer (with The Dawn)		
2012	Pinoy Rock MYX	Himself / Host		
2016	It's Showtime	Himself / Guest Performer (with The Dawn)		
2019	Studio 7	Himself / Guest Performer (with The Dawn)		
2019	It's Showtime	Himself / Guest Performer (with The Dawn and guest drummer Kurt Floresca)		
2022	Family Feud	Himself / Guest Player (with The Dawn and Carlos Orosa)	(credited as Kiko Reyes)	
2022	It's Showtime	Himself / Guest Performer	(for Magpasikat 2022)	
2023	It's Showtime	Himself / Guest Performer (with The Dawn)		
2023	2023 FIBA Basketball World Cup: Opening Ceremony	Himself / Guest Performer (with The Dawn)		
2025	Eat Bulaga!	Himself / Performer (with The Dawn)		
2025	All-Out Sundays	Himself / Performer (with The Dawn)		

=== Film ===
Year	Title	Role	Notes	Ref.
1994	Mama's Boys 2 (Let's Go Na!)	Himself		
2006	Tulad ng Dati	Himself		

=== Radio ===
Year	Title	Role	Station	Notes	Ref.
1997–2010	In the Raw	Himself / Host	NU107		

== Discography ==
The Dawn

- Heart's Thunder (1990)
- Abot Kamay (1992)
- Puno't Dulo (1994)
- Prodigal Sun (2000)
- Harapin (2004)
- Tulad ng Dati (2006)
- The Later Half of Day (2008)

Peso Movement

- The Gentle Sound of Chaos (2014)
