= Jett Pangan =

Filipino actor (born 1968)

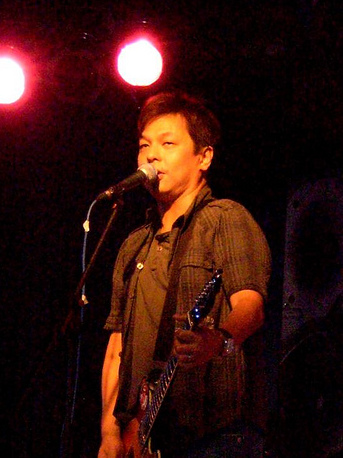
- Pangan performing onstage
- Born: Reginald Jose Pangan; June 21, 1968 (age 58); Manila, Philippines
- Other name: Jet Pangan
- Education: De La Salle University–Manila
- Occupations: Actor; musician
- Years active: 1985–present
- Spouse: Elizabeth Tirona (m. 1994)
- Children: 2
- Musical career
- Genres: Pinoy rock
- Instruments: Vocals; guitar; keyboards
- Labels: MCA Music Philippines; Warner Music Philippines; Sony Music Entertainment Philippines; OctoArts International; Viva Records; Orbit Music; Star Music
- Member of: The Dawn
- Formerly of: The Jett Pangan Group

Reginald Jose Pangan (born June 21, 1968), better known as Jett Pangan, is a Filipino actor and musician. He is best known as the lead vocalist and frontman of the Filipino rock band the Dawn and for his work in musical theater and film. Pangan has also released solo music and led the now-defunct Jett Pangan Group, earning recognition as one of the Philippines’ most versatile performers.

== Early career ==
Reginald Jose Pangan was born on June 21, 1968, in Manila, Philippines. He attended his grade school and high school years in San Beda College and attending college at De La Salle University–Manila where he earned a degree in mechanical engineering, briefly working in the field before fully committing to a career in music. Pangan's formal education and early career transition reflect his blend of academic discipline and creative ambition.

== Acting career ==
Pangan has appeared in numerous television and film roles. His film appearances include "Tulad ng Dati" (2006), a musical drama centered on the Dawn's story, as well as roles in "Paano Kita Iibigin" (2007), "Halik sa Hangin" (2015), "The Breakup Playlist" (2015), "Historiographika Errata" (2017), and others. Pangan has also made guest and supporting appearances in Philippine television series such as "FPJ's Ang Probinsyano", "Born for You", "Wildflower", "Marry Me, Marry You", "Flower of Evil", "Lyric and Beat", "Black Rider", "Prinsesa ng City Jail", and "Sins of the Father".

== Music career ==
=== The Dawn (1985–1995, 1999–present) ===
Pangan's music career began in 1985, he was approached to audition for a band that would later become one of the most successful rock bands in the Philippines, The Dawn alongside Teddy Diaz, JB Leonor, and Clay Luna. The band quickly rose to prominence in the Philippine Original Pilipino Music (OPM) scene with classic hits such as "Salamat", "Enveloped Ideas", and "Iisang Bangka Tayo". Their debut album The Dawn was released in 1986, followed by several albums through the early 1990s.

After the disbandment of the Dawn in 1995, the band would later on hold a sold-out reunion concert at the ULTRA basketball stadium in 1997, an event that didn't prove to be the spark that would ignite a re-grouping. However, in 1999, the band members were unanimous in taking the Dawn back on the road.

With The Dawn, Pangan has toured widely and celebrated milestones such as their Almost 40 concert in 2025, showcasing longevity in the rock music landscape. He has also released solo material, including the single "Lipad" in 2018.

=== Solo work and Jett Pangan Group (1995–2001) ===
When the Dawn disbanded in 1995, Pangan moved on to work as a recording company executive and was later persuaded to release the solo album, Spell. Pangan formed the Jett Pangan Group, releasing two albums including The Jett Pangan Group and Daylight. They disbanded in 2001 after which Pangan rejoined The Dawn in 1999 and has continued to perform with the band across multiple decades.

== Theater career ==
In between touring and recording, Pangan finds time to act in musical theater that he made his musical theater debut in 2000. In 2001, his first musical theater involvement was in the rock opera Jesus Christ Superstar as the role of Pontius Pilate together with fellow musicians Rico Blanco and Noel Cabangon. He was also involved in local productions such as tick, tick… BOOM! (2002), Jekyll and Hyde, Nine, Next to Normal, and Beauty and the Beast that he played as Beast. He would later play the lead role in an international musical production of Stephen Soundheim's Sweeney Todd: The Demon Barber of Fleet Street as Sweeney Todd in 2019 alongside actress/singer Lea Salonga.

== Personal life ==
Pangan is married to Elizabeth Tirona on June 18, 1994. They have two children: Erika Ramone and Rafael (Rafi).

== Filmography ==
=== Film ===
Year	Title	Role	Notes	Ref.
1987	Olongapo: The Great American Dream	Himself	First movie appearance (with The Dawn)	
1991	Noel Juico, 16: Batang Kriminal	Man of Tonton	First movie appearance (solo)	
1994	Mama's Boys 2 (Let's Go Na!)	Himself		
2006	Tulad ng Dati	Himself		
2007	Paano Kita Iibigin	Mon		
2015	Halik sa Hangin	Rene		
2015	The Breakup Playlist	Lester		
2017	Historiographika Errata	Andrés Bonifacio		
2023	What If?	Enrico Neri		
2024	Fuchsia Libre	Raymond Crisologo		

=== Television series ===
Year	Title	Role	Notes	Ref.
2005	Voltes V Evolution	Draco	Voice-over	
2007	BECK: Mongolian Chop Squad	Saitou Ken'ichi	Voice-over	
2015	Mac and Chiz	Mak	1 episode	
2015	FPJ's Ang Probinsyano	Edson Lee	Guest role / Antagonist	
2016	Born for You	Marcus	Supporting role	
2016–2017	Hahamakin ang Lahat	Charlie Ke	Supporting role / Protagonist	
2017	Wildflower	Gov. William Alvarez	Supporting role / Antagonist (in season 1)	
2017	A Love to Last	Smith	Special participation / Protagonist (in Chapter 2, uncredited)	
2021	Babawiin Ko ang Lahat	Akira Tanaka	Guest role / Antagonist	
2021–2022	Marry Me, Marry You	Michael "Myke" Jacinto	Supporting role / Protagonist	
2022	Flower of Evil	Gerry Payumo	Supporting role / Protagonist	
2022	Lyric and Beat	Peter	Supporting role / Protagonist	
2023–2024	Black Rider	Richard Uy	Guest role / Protagonist (credited as Jet Pangan)	
2025	Prinsesa ng City Jail	Benhur Torres-Cristobal	Supporting role / Protagonist	
2025	Sins of the Father	Pol. General Joel Balagtas	Guest cast / Protagonist	

=== Web shows ===
Year	Title	Role	Notes	Ref.
2019	Bagman	Big Boy	Guest role	
2021	Afterlife	Peter Ong	Main role / Anti-hero	

=== Television shows ===
Year	Title	Role	Ref.
2013	Himig Handog 2013	Himself / Judge	
2015	ASOP Music Festival Year 4 Grand Finals Night	Himself / Judge	
2019	D'Academy Asia (season 5)	Himself / Judge	
2021	Lunch Out Loud (now Tropang LOL)	Himself / Guest Judge	
2023	It's Showtime	Himself / Magpasikat Judge	

=== Sitcom ===
Year	Title	Role	Notes	Ref.
2015	Pepito Manaloto	James	Himself / Guest role (credited as Jet Pangan)	

=== TV show host ===
Year	Title	Role	Notes	Ref.
2004–2019	Myx Live!	Himself / Host	He was replacing Bernard Palanca and Rico Blanco	

=== Anthologies ===
Year	Title	Role	Network	Notes	Ref.
2018	Ipaglaban Mo!	Orly	ABS-CBN	Episode: "Sumpaan"	

=== Various TV shows ===
Year	Title	Role	Notes	Ref.
1988	Martin After Dark	Himself / Guest Performer	(with The Dawn)	
1994	1st NU Rock Awards	Himself / Performer	(with The Dawn)	
1997	SOP	Himself / Guest Performer	(with The Dawn)	
1999	6th NU Rock Awards	Himself / Presenter	(with The Dawn's Atsushi Matsuura and JB Leonor) (credited as Jet Pangan)	
2000	Eat Bulaga!	Himself / Guest Performer	(together with Cooky Chua, Joey de Leon, Allan K., Mike Hanopol, Pepe Smith, Jun Lopito, Louie Talan and Miguel Ortigas)	
2006	All-Star K!	Himself / Guest		
2006	Cheers to '07 Countdown: The GMA New Year Countdown Special	Himself / Performer		
2007	The ARAW Values Advertising Awards	Himself / Guest Performer	(with The Dawn)	
2007	Celebrity Duets: Philippine Edition	Himself / Celebrity Partner		
2007	MYX Music Awards 2008	Himself / Performer	(tribute for MYX Magna Gary Valenciano, together with Regine Velasquez, Ogie Alcasid, Vina Morales, Janno Gibbs, Kyla, Jaya, Ebe Dancel and Aia de Leon, and his sons Paolo and Gab)	
2008	Pinoy Idol Extra	Himself / Guest		
2009	Wowowee	Himself / Performer	(together with Rachel Alejandro, Dingdong Avanzado, Geneva Cruz, Chad Borja and Richard Reynoso)	
2009	Are You the Next Big Star?	Himself / Performer	(credited as Jet Pangan)	
2014	The Ryzza Mae Show	Himself / Guest	(with Cooky Chua)	
2015	The Singing Bee	Himself / Challenger	(with co-challenger Gino Padilla and Richard Reynoso)	
2015	Kapamilya, Deal or No Deal	Himself / Briefcase No. 6		
2015	It's Showtime	Himself / Guest Performer	(with The Dawn)	
2015	Binibining Pilipinas 2015: The Road to the Crown - Pre-Pageant Special	Himself / Guest Performer	(with The Dawn)	
2016	NET25 Letters and Music	Himself / Guest Performer	(with The Dawn's Rommel "Sancho" Sanchez)	
2016	Unang Hirit	Himself / Guest Performer	(with The Dawn)	
2016	It's Showtime	Himself / Guest Performer	(with The Dawn)	
2016	Superstar Duets	Himself / Guest Performer	(credited as Jet Pangan)	
2017	Eat Bulaga!	Himself / Guest Player	as a segment of Jackpoy en Poy	
2017	Eat Bulaga!	Himself / Guest Performer	as a segment of Broadway Boys	
2017	Magandang Buhay	Himself / Guest		
2017	I Can See Your Voice	Himself / Guest	(in Season 1)	
2018	ASAP	Himself / Guest Performer	(together with Kean Cipriano, Teddy Corpuz, Yeng Constantino, and KZ Tandingan)	
2018	ASAP	Himself / Performer	as a segment of ASAP Versus (together with Ato Arman)	
2019	Studio 7	Himself / Guest Performer	(with The Dawn)	
2019	Studio 7	Himself / Guest Performer	as a segment of Duet with Me (with contestants Nef Medina and Neil Pedrosa)	
2019	Umagang Kay Ganda	Himself / Guest		
2019	It's Showtime	Himself / Guest Performer	(with The Dawn)	
2020	ASAP	Himself / Guest Performer	For his then-upcoming concert, “90s Frontment Acousticized” (together with Kapamilya Divas, Basti Artadi, Dong Abay and Wency Cornejo)	
2020	Eat Bulaga!	Himself / Celebrity Judge	as a segment of Bawal Judgmental	
2020	It's Showtime	Himself / Celebrity Singer	as a segment of Hide and Sing	
2020	Chika, Besh!	Himself / Guest	(with Wency Cornejo)	
2021	Mars Pa More (now Mars)	Himself / Guest		
2021	Lunch Out Loud (now Tropang LOL)	Himself / Guest Player	(with co-challenger Ariel Rivera)	
2021	Lunch Out Loud (now Tropang LOL)	Himself / Guest Performer	(together with Ariel Rivera)	
2021	At Home with GMA Regional TV	Himself / Guest	as a segment of Biztalk	
2021	GMA Regional TV Early Edition	Himself / Guest	as a segment of Biztalk	
2021	LSS: The Martin Nievera Show	Himself / Guest		
2021	Tulong-Tulong sa Pag-ahon	Himself / Performer		
2021	ABS-CBN Christmas Special 2021	Himself / Performer		
2022	Family Feud	Himself / Guest Player	(with The Dawn's Rommel "Sancho" Sanchez & Francis Reyes and Carlo Orosa)	
2023	Tropang LOL	Himself / Guest Player	as a segment of Swap Test (with his daughter Erica Pangan)	
2023	It's Showtime	Himself / Guest Performer	(with The Dawn)	
2023	2023 FIBA Basketball World Cup: Opening Ceremony	Himself / Performer	(with The Dawn, Sarah Geronimo, JRoa, Ben&Ben and Alamat)	
2024	Family Feud	Himself / Guest Player		
2025	Fast Talk with Boy Abunda	Himself	(with Ayen Munji-Laurel)	
2025	Eat Bulaga!	Himself / Performer	(with The Dawn)	
2025	All-Out Sundays	Himself / Performer	(with The Dawn)	
2025	The Clash (season 7)	Himself / Performer	(with contestant Juary Sabith)	

=== Podcast ===
Year	Title	Notes	Ref.
2020–2024	Jett's Talk Show...Sort of		

=== Webcast ===
Year	Title	Role	Notes	Ref.
2018	SoundTrip	Himself		
2024	9th Wish Music Awards	Himself / Presenter	(with Francis Reyes)	

=== Music videos ===
Year	Title	Director	Refs.
1989	"Salamat"		
1992	"Iisang Bangka Tayo"		
2002	"Paano Naman Kami"		
2004	"Harapin ang Liwanag"		
2004	"Change (is Breaking Us Apart)"		
2005	"Tulad ng Dati"		
2006	"Ang Iyong Paalam"		
2008	"Message in a Bottle"		
2009	"Hatak"		
2016	"The Way It Turns"		
2016	"Paraisong Tanso"		
2017	"MerryGoRound"		
2018	"Segurista"		
2018	"Lipad"		
2020	"Belong"		
2021	"Andito Tayo Para sa Isa't Isa"		

== Discography ==
=== Studio albums ===
The Dawn

Year	Title	Label	Certifications
1987	The Dawn	OctoArts International (now PolyEast Records)	—N/a
1988	I Stand with You	OctoArts International (now PolyEast Records)	—N/a
1989	Beyond the Bend	OctoArts International (now PolyEast Records)	—N/a
1990	Heart's Thunder	OctoArts International (now PolyEast Records)	—N/a
1992	Abot Kamay	OctoArts International (now PolyEast Records)	—N/a
1994	Puno't Dulo	OctoArts International (now PolyEast Records)	—N/a
2000	Prodigal Sun	Sony BMG Music	—N/a
2004	Harapin	Warner Music Philippines	—N/a
2006	Tulad ng Dati	Warner Music Philippines	—N/a
2008	The Later Half of Day	MCA Music Philippines	—N/a
2009	Sound the Alarm	Sony Music Philippines	—N/a
2018	Ascendant	Solstice Ventures Inc.	—N/a

As solo artist

Year	Title	Label	Certifications
1995	Spell	Viva Records	—N/a

Jett Pangan Group

Year	Title	Label	Certifications
1998	The Jett Pangan Group	Orbit Music	—N/a
1999	Daylight	Orbit Music	—N/a

=== Compilation albums ===
Year	Title	Label
1992	Iisang Bangka Tayo	OctoArts International (now PolyEast Records)
1997	The Dawn: OPM Timeless Collection Gold Series	OctoArts-EMI Music (now PolyEast Records)
2001	The Story of The Dawn: The Ultimate OPM Collection	EMI Philippines (now PolyEast Records)

=== Live albums ===
Year	Title	Label
1989	The Dawn: Live	OctoArts International (now PolyEast Records)

=== Extended plays ===
Year	Title	Label
2015	Simulan Na Natin (CD, iTunes)	Solstice Ventures Inc.

=== Singles ===
==== As a lead artist ====
Year	Title	Album
1995	"She Won't Be Waiting"	Spell
1995	"Ayoko"	Spell
1995	"Don't Do This to Me"	Spell
1995	"Ngayon Gabi"	Spell
1995	"Isipin Mo"	Spell
1995	"Spell"	Spell
1995	"Ang Luho Mo, Babe"	Spell
1995	"Thought About You"	Spell
1995	"Banat"	Spell
1995	"Kerubin"	Spell
2012	"As Long As"	Songs to Slash Your Wrist By
2015	"Strong"	Mercy and Compassion: Songs for Pope Francis
2018	"Lipad"	Non-album singles
2020	"Belong"	Non-album singles
2020	"Liliwanag Muli" (with Aicelle Santos)	Liliwanag Muli

=== Soundtrack ===
Year	Song	Film/Show	Ref.
2005	"Lisensyadong Kamao" (with Nasty Mac)	Lisensyadong Kamao	
2006	"Kahit Ika'y Panaginip Lang" (with Agot Isidro)	Tulad ng Dati	
2006	"Hindi Iyo"	First Day High	
2006	"Bawat Bata" (with The Dawn)	Kami nAPO Muna	
2007	"Jimmy Antiporda - Dalawang Dekada" (with Freddie Aguilar, Kuh Ledesma, Joey Ayala and Cookie Chua)	GMA News & Public Affairs (now GMA Integrated News)	
2010	"Ako ang Bayani"	RPG Metanoia	
2019	"Lipad"	Maalaala Mo Kaya: Youth Center	
2019	"Lipad"	Code Name: Terrius	

== Awards and nominations ==
Year	Awards ceremony	Category	Nominated work	Results	Refs.
2001	NU Rock Awards	Vocalist of the Year	—N/a	Nominated	
2005	NU Rock Awards	Vocalist of the Year	—N/a	Nominated	
2007	Golden Screen Awards	Breakthrough Performance by an Actor	Tulad ng Dati	Nominated	
2007	Gawad Urian Awards	Best Actor (Pinakamahusay na Pangunahing Aktor)	Tulad ng Dati	Nominated	
2017	C1 Originals Award	Best Supporting Actor	Historiographika Errata	Nominated	

== See also ==
- The Dawn
- Pinoy rock
