= Beyond the Bend =

Studio album by The Dawn
- Released: June 4, 1989 (Philippines)
- Studio: Greenhills Sound Production
- Genre: Rock, new wave
- Label: OctoArts International, Inc.
- Producer: Martin Galan, The Dawn

The Dawn chronology
I Stand With You (1988)	Beyond the Bend (1989)	The Dawn: Live (1989)

Beyond the Bend is the third studio album by the Filipino rock the Dawn, released on June 4, 1989, by OctoArts International, Inc. in the Philippines. The lead single and the first track on the album "Salamat" became their well-known hit in the Philippines. It is Atsushi Matsuura's first album with the band. Matsuura composed the song "Puno't Dulo", while Teddy Diaz composed "Hey, Isabel" and co-wrote "Salamat" with the other members (except Matsuura).

== Track listing ==
Side one
No.	Title	Writer(s)	Length
1.	"Salamat"	D Leonor III, C. Balcells, R. Pangan, T. Diaz	3:05
2.	"Rain (On Me)"	D. Leonor III, R. Pangan	3:58
3.	"Hey, Isabel"	T. Diaz, M. Galan	3:41
4.	"Rock Till You Drop"	C. Balcells, M. Galan	4:57

Side two
No.	Title	Writer(s)	Length
5.	"Beyond The Bend"	C. Balcells, M. Galan,	4:44
6.	"Little Paradise"	D. Leonor III, R. Pangan	3:22
7.	"His Name"	D. Leonor III, M. Galan, R. Pangan	4:57
8.	"Puno't Dulo"	A. Matsuura, M. Galan	4:16

== Personnel ==
- Jett Pangan - vocals
- JB Leonor - drums, acoustic piano, synthesizer, programming, percussion
- Atsushi Matsuura - electric guitar, acoustic guitar
- Teddy Diaz - guitar (track 1 and track 3)
- Carlos Balcells - bass guitar, percussion

== Album Credits ==
- Asst. Producer: Anton Choy Lopez
- Engineered By: Lito Balagtas
- Mixdown Engineer: Martin Galan/Lito Balagtas
- Arranged by: The Dawn
