= Enveloped Ideas (album) =

Studio album by Various artists
- Released: 2011
- Genre: Pinoy rock
- Label: MCA Music
- Producer: Eric Perpetua, Kerwin Rosete

Enveloped Ideas is an album recorded by various independent artists making tribute to the Filipino rock band The Dawn. The album was released on the occasion of the band marking 25 years in the music industry.

The album's title is in reference to "Enveloped Ideas", The Dawn's first single which was released in 1987 and is one of its greatest hits.

== Track listing ==
1. "Enveloped Ideas" - Techy Romantics
2. "Harapin ang Liwanag" - Enemies of Saturn
3. "Living Seed" - Lip Service
4. "Dreams" - Ginoong Vitalis
5. "Sali-Salita" - The Discoball
6. "Love Will Set Us Free" - Happy Days Ahead
7. "Ang Iyong Paalam" - Overtone
8. "I Saw You Coming In" - Join The Club
9. "Babaeng Mahiwaga" - Flying Ipis
10. "Little Paradise" - Gun Monkeys
11. "Difference" - Switch
12. "Talaga Naman" - Rubberpool
13. "Alam Ko, Alam N’yo" - Milk and Money
14. "Runaway" - Soft Pillow Kisses
15. "Tulad ng Dati" - Playphonics
