= Salamat (The Dawn song) =

Single by The Dawn

from the album Beyond the Bend
- Released: 1989
- Genre: Pinoy rock; new wave
- Label: EMI
- Songwriters: Teddy Diaz, JB Leonor, Jett Pangan, Carlos Balcells, Bonnie Melocoton

The Dawn singles chronology
"I Stand with You" (1988)	"Salamat" (1989)	"Iisang Bangka Tayo" (1991)

"Salamat" ("Thank you") is a song released by the Filipino rock band the Dawn in 1989. It was the lead single on their third album Beyond the Bend. It was written by Teddy Diaz, JB Leonor, Jett Pangan, Carlos Balcells and Bonnie Melocoton. In its instrumental break, the guitar solo was played by Diaz.

== Background and release ==
"Salamat" was released in 1989 as the lead single from Beyond the Bend, the band’s third album. It was written collaboratively by band members Teddy Diaz, JB Leonor, Jett Pangan, and Carlos Balcells, with additional writing credit to Bonnie Melocoton. The song’s instrumental break features a guitar solo performed by Teddy Diaz.

It was re-recorded by the Dawn in 2001 for their first album since 1994, Prodigal Sun.

== Music video ==
The song’s original music video features Atsushi Matsuura, who was then The Dawn’s guitarist.

== Composition and style ==
Erwin Castillo calls it "an inspired collaboration among The Dawn, our writer Bonnie Melocoton, and our producers."

David Gonzales of AllMusic commented: "It starts with a mysterious-sounding chord progression played on keyboards; a fiery guitar line explodes and the song becomes a fast-paced, tuneful outing, punctuated by spirited keyboard and guitar lines. The song also contains an interlude where a searing guitar solo is played over hard-edged guitar chords."

== Reception and legacy ==
"Salamat" quickly became a fan favourite and is considered a classic anthem in Original Pilipino Music (OPM). According to lead vocalist Jett Pangan, the song has maintained its popularity across generations, often eliciting strong audience reactions when performed live.

The song’s Extended appeal has made it a important part of The Dawn’s live repertoire, and it has been performed at major events including music festivals and anniversary concerts.

== Notable cover versions ==
- In 2012, The Filipino rock band Letter Day Story recorded a cover featuring Filipino rock veteran Pepe Smith. This version was part of the compilation album Tunog Natin: Songs From Home, intended to connect a new generation of listeners with classic OPM hits. The music video was shot in Sta. Rosa, Laguna, and the collaboration was praised for bringing fresh energy while honoring the original.
- In 2020, The Dawn's frontman Jett Pangan recorded a tribute version in a more subdued arrangement for a special video reflecting meaningful connections during the COVID-19 pandemic, showcasing the song’s emotional range beyond its rock origins.

== Personnel ==
- Teddy Diaz - electric and lead guitar
- JB Leonor - drums
- Jett Pangan - vocals
- Carlos Balcells - bass
