= List of Black Rider episodes =

Black Rider is a Philippine television drama action series broadcast by GMA Network. It aired on the network's Telebabad line up from November 6, 2023 to July 26, 2024, replacing Maging Sino Ka Man.

== Series overview ==
| Season | Episodes | Originally released | |
| Season | Episodes | First released | Last released |
|---|---|---|---|
| 1 | 188 | November 6, 2023 | July 26, 2024 |

== Episodes ==
| No. | Title | Original release date |
|---|---|---|
| 1 | "Pilot" | November 6, 2023 |
| 2 | "Episode 2" | November 7, 2023 |
| 3 | "Episode 3" | November 8, 2023 |
| 4 | "Episode 4" | November 9, 2023 |
| 5 | "Episode 5" | November 10, 2023 |
| 6 | "Paniningil" (transl. payback) | November 13, 2023 |
| 7 | "Ganti" (transl. revenge) | November 14, 2023 |
| 8 | "Sindikato" (transl. syndicate) | November 15, 2023 |
| 9 | "Sabwatan" (transl. collusion) | November 16, 2023 |
| 10 | "Bagong Kaibigan" (transl. new friend) | November 17, 2023 |
| 11 | "Rebelasyon" (transl. revelation) | November 20, 2023 |
| 12 | "Sikreto" (transl. secret) | November 21, 2023 |
| 13 | "Matinding Laban" (transl. intense battle) | November 22, 2023 |
| 14 | "Pasabog" (transl. explosion) | November 23, 2023 |
| 15 | "Plano" (transl. plan) | November 24, 2023 |
| 16 | "Suspetsa" (transl. suspicion) | November 27, 2023 |
| 17 | "Bakbakan" (transl. action) | November 28, 2023 |
| 18 | "Katotohanan" (transl. truth) | November 29, 2023 |
| 19 | "Sugod" (transl. charge) | November 30, 2023 |
| 20 | "Black Rider vs. Golden Scorpion" | December 1, 2023 |
| 21 | "Romana" | December 4, 2023 |
| 22 | "Bagong Pagsubok" (transl. new challenge) | December 5, 2023 |
| 23 | "Engkwentro" (transl. encounter) | December 6, 2023 |
| 24 | "Sagupaan" (transl. battle) | December 7, 2023 |
| 25 | "Walang Atrasan" (transl. no turning back) | December 8, 2023 |
| 26 | "Black Rider at Bane" (transl. Black Rider and Bane) | December 11, 2023 |
| 27 | "Harana" (transl. serenade) | December 12, 2023 |
| 28 | "Testigo" (transl. witness) | December 13, 2023 |
| 29 | "Peligro" (transl. danger) | December 14, 2023 |
| 30 | "Matinding Kalaban" (transl. intense enemy) | December 15, 2023 |
| 31 | "Sukdulan" (transl. extreme) | December 18, 2023 |
| 32 | "Palaban" (transl. fighter) | December 19, 2023 |
| 33 | "Kapahamakan" (transl. disaster) | December 20, 2023 |
| 34 | "Walang Kawala" (transl. no escape) | December 21, 2023 |
| 35 | "Impyerno" (transl. hell) | December 22, 2023 |
| 36 | "Pasko" (transl. Christmas) | December 25, 2023 |
| 37 | "Pagtakas" (transl. escape) | December 26, 2023 |
| 38 | "Hagupit" (transl. devastate) | December 27, 2023 |
| 39 | "Obsesyon" (transl. obsession) | December 28, 2023 |
| 40 | "Resbak" (transl. revenge) | December 29, 2023 |
| 41 | "Bagong Taon" (transl. new year) | January 1, 2024 |
| 42 | "Delikadong Laban" (transl. dangerous battle) | January 2, 2024 |
| 43 | "Bangungot" (transl. nightmare) | January 3, 2024 |
| 44 | "Mastermind" | January 4, 2024 |
| 45 | "Walang Susuko" (transl. no quitting) | January 5, 2024 |
| 46 | "Black Rider Hanggang Kamatayan" (transl. Black Rider until death) | January 8, 2024 |
| 47 | "Delubyo" (transl. deluge) | January 9, 2024 |
| 48 | "Hagupit" (transl. devastate) | January 10, 2024 |
| 49 | "Kumander" (transl. commander) | January 11, 2024 |
| 50 | "Walang Takot" (transl. no fear) | January 12, 2024 |
| 51 | "Matinding Desisyon" (transl. tough decision) | January 15, 2024 |
| 52 | "Black Rider Para sa Hustisya" (transl. Black Rider for justice) | January 16, 2024 |
| 53 | "Komprontasyon" (transl. confrontation) | January 17, 2024 |
| 54 | "Karma" | January 18, 2024 |
| 55 | "Gantihan" (transl. avenging) | January 19, 2024 |
| 56 | "Arestado" (transl. arrested) | January 22, 2024 |
| 57 | "Dakip" (transl. catch) | January 23, 2024 |
| 58 | "Tangka" (transl. intention) | January 24, 2024 |
| 59 | "Black Rider in Tandem" | January 25, 2024 |
| 60 | "DNA" | January 26, 2024 |
| 61 | "Ex-Lover" | January 29, 2024 |
| 62 | "Sabotahe" (transl. sabotage) | January 30, 2024 |
| 63 | "Marikit" | January 31, 2024 |
| 64 | "Winner" | February 1, 2024 |
| 65 | "Buking" (transl. exposed) | February 2, 2024 |
| 66 | "Black Rider Reveal" | February 5, 2024 |
| 67 | "Pagkilala" (transl. recognition) | February 6, 2024 |
| 68 | "Pretty Liar" | February 7, 2024 |
| 69 | "Putukan" (transl. shootout) | February 8, 2024 |
| 70 | "Bistado" (transl. caught) | February 9, 2024 |
| 71 | "Ganti" (transl. revenge) | February 12, 2024 |
| 72 | "Traydor" (transl. traitor) | February 13, 2024 |
| 73 | "Hostage" | February 14, 2024 |
| 74 | "Resbak" (transl. revenge) | February 15, 2024 |
| 75 | "Rescue" | February 16, 2024 |
| 76 | "Manman" (transl. observe) | February 19, 2024 |
| 77 | "Hari" (transl. king) | February 20, 2024 |
| 78 | "Baby Switch" | February 21, 2024 |
| 79 | "Who's Your Daddy?" | February 22, 2024 |
| 80 | "Lason" (transl. poison) | February 23, 2024 |
| 81 | "Calvin at Abel" (transl. Calvin and Abel) | February 26, 2024 |
| 82 | "Calvin, Kalma" (transl. Calvin, calm down) | February 27, 2024 |
| 83 | "Alma Matters" | February 28, 2024 |
| 84 | "Mother, Father" | February 29, 2024 |
| 85 | "Black Rider vs. Calvin" | March 1, 2024 |
| 86 | "Rambulan" (transl. brawl) | March 4, 2024 |
| 87 | "Paboritong Anak" (transl. favorite son) | March 5, 2024 |
| 88 | "Pasiklaban" (transl. showdown) | March 6, 2024 |
| 89 | "Black Rider vs. Edgardo" | March 7, 2024 |
| 90 | "Patigasan" (transl. test of strength) | March 8, 2024 |
| 91 | "Black Rider, Kill Calvin" | March 11, 2024 |
| 92 | "Wanted: Black Rider" | March 12, 2024 |
| 93 | "Ubusang Lahi" (transl. losing ancestry) | March 13, 2024 |
| 94 | "Kill Them All" | March 14, 2024 |
| 95 | "Masaker" (transl. massacre) | March 15, 2024 |
| 96 | "Black Rider, Attack!" | March 18, 2024 |
| 97 | "Tiagong Dulas" | March 19, 2024 |
| 98 | "Resbak" (transl. revenge) | March 20, 2024 |
| 99 | "This is War" | March 21, 2024 |
| 100 | "Sugod Na!" (transl. let's charge!) | March 22, 2024 |
| 101 | "Resurrection" | March 25, 2024 |
| 102 | "Big Bayad" (transl. big pay) | March 26, 2024 |
| 103 | "Laman sa Laman" (transl. flesh over flesh) | March 27, 2024 |
| 104 | "Sagad Na" (transl. already to the max) | April 1, 2024 |
| 105 | "Galit Na Galit" (transl. very angry) | April 2, 2024 |
| 106 | "Double Dead" | April 3, 2024 |
| 107 | "Nonchallant" | April 4, 2024 |
| 108 | "Walang Magbabati" (transl. no reconciliation) | April 5, 2024 |
| 109 | "Nilunok" (transl. swallowed) | April 8, 2024 |
| 110 | "Ratrat" (transl. pelt) | April 9, 2024 |
| 111 | "Tuklaw" (transl. bite) | April 10, 2024 |
| 112 | "Lingkisan" (transl. coiling) | April 11, 2024 |
| 113 | "I Love Totoy" | April 12, 2024 |
| 114 | "Titig Galit" (transl. angrily staring) | April 15, 2024 |
| 115 | "Bagong Digmaan" (transl. new battle) | April 16, 2024 |
| 116 | "Lumuhod Ka" (transl. kneel down) | April 17, 2024 |
| 117 | "Nimfa-tikim" | April 18, 2024 |
| 118 | "Naked Truth" | April 19, 2024 |
| 119 | "Nimfa-kiss" | April 22, 2024 |
| 120 | "Crossover" | April 23, 2024 |
| 121 | "Abot Kamay" (transl. within reach) | April 24, 2024 |
| 122 | "Analyn" | April 25, 2024 |
| 123 | "Putukan Na!" (transl. shooting time!) | April 26, 2024 |
| 124 | "Pinya Tamis" (transl. sweet pineapple) | April 29, 2024 |
| 125 | "Ang Init!" (transl. it's hot!) | April 30, 2024 |
| 126 | "Jojowain" | May 1, 2024 |
| 127 | "Hunting Alma" | May 2, 2024 |
| 128 | "Ama vs. Anak" (transl. father vs. son) | May 3, 2024 |
| 129 | "Lihim ni Bane" (transl. Bane's secret) | May 6, 2024 |
| 130 | "Mortal Enemies" | May 7, 2024 |
| 131 | "Panganib" (transl. danger) | May 8, 2024 |
| 132 | "Secret Meeting" | May 9, 2024 |
| 133 | "Madam President" | May 10, 2024 |
| 134 | "Kill Madam Pres." | May 13, 2024 |
| 135 | "Pagtakas" (transl. escape) | May 14, 2024 |
| 136 | "Jailbreak" | May 15, 2024 |
| 137 | "Doble Pasabog" (transl. double explosion) | May 16, 2024 |
| 138 | "Black Rider, Save the Pres." | May 17, 2024 |
| 139 | "Habulan" (transl. chase) | May 20, 2024 |
| 140 | "Taguan" (transl. hide) | May 21, 2024 |
| 141 | "Ang Traydor" (transl. the traitor) | May 22, 2024 |
| 142 | "Teresa, Torture!" | May 23, 2024 |
| 143 | "Dark Past" | May 24, 2024 |
| 144 | "Ubos Lakas" (transl. running out of strength) | May 27, 2024 |
| 145 | "Jeep Scandal" | May 28, 2024 |
| 146 | "Bawal Kabit" (transl. mistress not allowed) | May 29, 2024 |
| 147 | "Sardinas" (transl. sardines) | May 30, 2024 |
| 148 | "Wedding" | May 31, 2024 |
| 149 | "Bwisita" (transl. unwanted visitor) | June 3, 2024 |
| 150 | "Tigil Kasal" (transl. stop the wedding) | June 4, 2024 |
| 151 | "Red Wedding" | June 5, 2024 |
| 152 | "Bye, Alma" | June 6, 2024 |
| 153 | "Black Rider 'Til Death" | June 7, 2024 |
| 154 | "Bye, Elias" | June 10, 2024 |
| 155 | "Your Donor" | June 11, 2024 |
| 156 | "Pares Trouble" | June 12, 2024 |
| 157 | "Agaw Buhay" (transl. dying) | June 13, 2024 |
| 158 | "Alma, Kalma" (transl. calm down, Alma) | June 14, 2024 |
| 159 | "Wrestling" | June 17, 2024 |
| 160 | "Papa-lakas" (transl. strength) | June 18, 2024 |
| 161 | "Gising na" (transl. now awake) | June 19, 2024 |
| 162 | "Bagong Bane" (transl. new Bane) | June 20, 2024 |
| 163 | "Wanted Ka, Black Rider" (transl. you're wanted, Black Rider) | June 21, 2024 |
| 164 | "Alma Palaban" (transl. Alma the fighter) | June 24, 2024 |
| 165 | "Taguro" | June 25, 2024 |
| 166 | "Sugod Party" (transl. invade the party) | June 26, 2024 |
| 167 | "Bayad Utang" (transl. pay the debt) | June 27, 2024 |
| 168 | "Ang Banta sa ganti" (transl. the threat of retaliation) | June 28, 2024 |
| 169 | "Big Surprise" | July 1, 2024 |
| 170 | "Aalma Na" (transl. time to fight back) | July 2, 2024 |
| 171 | "Oppa, Laban!" (transl. Oppa, fight!) | July 3, 2024 |
| 172 | "Moises" | July 4, 2024 |
| 173 | "Gwenchana" | July 5, 2024 |
| 174 | "Palag Ka?" (transl. are you against me?) | July 8, 2024 |
| 175 | "First Date" | July 9, 2024 |
| 176 | "Buking Na" (transl. now exposed) | July 10, 2024 |
| 177 | "Pards" | July 11, 2024 |
| 178 | "Duda Honors" | July 12, 2024 |
| 179 | "Kinadena" (transl. chained) | July 15, 2024 |
| 180 | "Missing Moises" | July 16, 2024 |
| 181 | "Alma Awa" | July 17, 2024 |
| 182 | "Dakila" (transl. hero) | July 18, 2024 |
| 183 | "Mariano is Back" | July 19, 2024 |
| 184 | "Kasal-kasalan" (transl. forced wedding) | July 22, 2024 |
| 185 | "Who's the Daddy?" | July 23, 2024 |
| 186 | "Anak ni Bane" (transl. Bane's child) | July 24, 2024 |
| 187 | "Black Rider and Calvin Battle" | July 25, 2024 |
| 188 | "Heroic Finale" | July 26, 2024 |
