= Salome Salvi =

Filipino adult content creator and actress

- Education: University of the Philippines Diliman
- Occupations: Adult content creator; actress; model
- Years active: 2017–present
- Partner: Emil Sandoval (2024–present)

Salome Salvi is a Filipina adult content creator, actress, and model. She is known for her work in the adult industry and her transition into mainstream media, appearing in Vivamax films and the GMA Network television series Black Rider. The 2022 film Kitty K7 was inspired by her life experiences as a camgirl.

== Early life and education ==
Salome Salvi holds a degree in Fine Arts from the University of the Philippines Diliman. She has stated that her background in visual arts influences her creative process in content creation. Salvi is estranged from her parents, who disapproved of her entry into sex work.

== Career ==
=== Adult industry ===
Salvi began her career in 2017 using an "alter" account on Twitter before transitioning to full-time hardcore pornography in 2020. She publishes content on platforms such as OnlyFans and Pornhub. In 2023, director Roman Perez Jr. cast her in the Vivamax series Ssshhh, where she played the role of a sex adviser. Perez described her as the "Maria Ozawa of the Philippines" due to her performance skills.

Salvi actively collaborates with other creators in the industry, describing the relationship between local content creators as "symbiotic" rather than competitive. She has filmed collaborations with various performers, including American actor Thor Johnson where they shot for Trike Patrol, a well known Filipina paysite, and her partner Emil Sandoval.

=== Film and television ===
Salvi's life story served as the inspiration for the 2022 film Kitty K7, directed by Joy Aquino and produced by Antoinette Jadaone and Dan Villegas. The film starred Rose Van Ginkel in the lead role. Salvi attended the film's screening and noted that the script accurately reflected her personal experiences, particularly regarding her family relationships and the stigma faced by sex workers.

In 2024, she joined the cast of the GMA Network primetime series Black Rider. She played a member of the "Biyahero Riders," a group that provided comic relief in the series. Salvi stated that the role required her to develop new skills in acting, line memorization, and improvisation.

She has appeared in several films for the streaming platform VMX (formerly Vivamax), including Tahong, Mayumi, Ahasss, and Boy Kaldag. In the film Tahong, she portrayed the character Talia, a barangay kagawad.

=== Other ventures ===
In 2025, Salvi was invited to serve as a jury member for the 6th CineGoma Film Festival. She represented the acting sector of the film industry on the jury panel. That same year, she became the host of the podcast Bold Cast for the streaming platform CinePOP. In October 2025, she hosted the "Sleaze Ball" Halloween event in Quezon City.

== Personal life ==
Salvi identifies as bisexual. In 2024, she began a relationship with actor Emil Sandoval, who was a matinee idol in the 1980s. The couple met while working on a project for Viva and subsequently moved in together. They maintain an open relationship, which Salvi has described as allowing them to be physically involved with others while remaining emotionally attached to one another. Sandoval has also participated in creating adult content with Salvi.

Salvi has spoken publicly about the mental health challenges caused by online harassment and stigma regarding her profession. In a November 2025 interview, she admitted to experiencing suicidal thoughts due to the severity of the abuse. She stated that she finds therapy and support from friends effective for her mental health, noting that she does not practice prayer or religion.

== Advocacy ==
Salvi is a member of the Philippine Sex Workers Collective. She advocates for the decriminalization of sex work and fair representation of the humanity of sex workers in media.

In September 2025, Salvi attended a protest rally in Mendiola, Manila, to denounce government corruption. Her participation in the rally drew significant attention on social media, where she received sexually explicit and harassing comments from detractors.
