= Black Rider (TV series) =

Philippine television drama series

- Title card in 2024
- Genre: Action drama
- Created by: Erwin Caezar Bravo
- Written by: Erwin Caezar Bravo; John Paul Bedia; Adam Cornelius Asin; Dickson Comia; Lawrence Nicodemus
- Directed by: Rommel Penesa; Richard Arellano
- Starring: Ruru Madrid
- Theme music composer: Vehnee Saturno
- Opening theme: "Mahal Pa Rin Kita" by Limuel Llanes
- Country of origin: Philippines
- Original language: Tagalog
- No. of episodes: 188 (list of episodes)

Production
- Executive producers: Lea Reyes; Tanna Mae delos Santos
- Production location: Metro Manila
- Cinematography: Mark Reynold Ginolos
- Camera setup: Multiple-camera setup
- Running time: 24–46 minutes
- Production company: GMA Public Affairs

Original release
- Network: GMA Network
- Release: November 6, 2023 – July 26, 2024

Black Rider is a Philippine television drama action series broadcast by GMA Network. Directed by Rommel Penesa and Richard Arellano, it stars Ruru Madrid in the title role. It premiered on November 6, 2023 on the network's Telebabad line up. The series concluded on July 26, 2024, with a total of 188 episodes.

The series is streaming online on YouTube.

== Premise ==
Elias, a motorcycle delivery driver becomes a vigilante to be known as the "Black Rider". He is set to fight a syndicate, the Golden Scorpion.

== Cast and characters ==
Cast

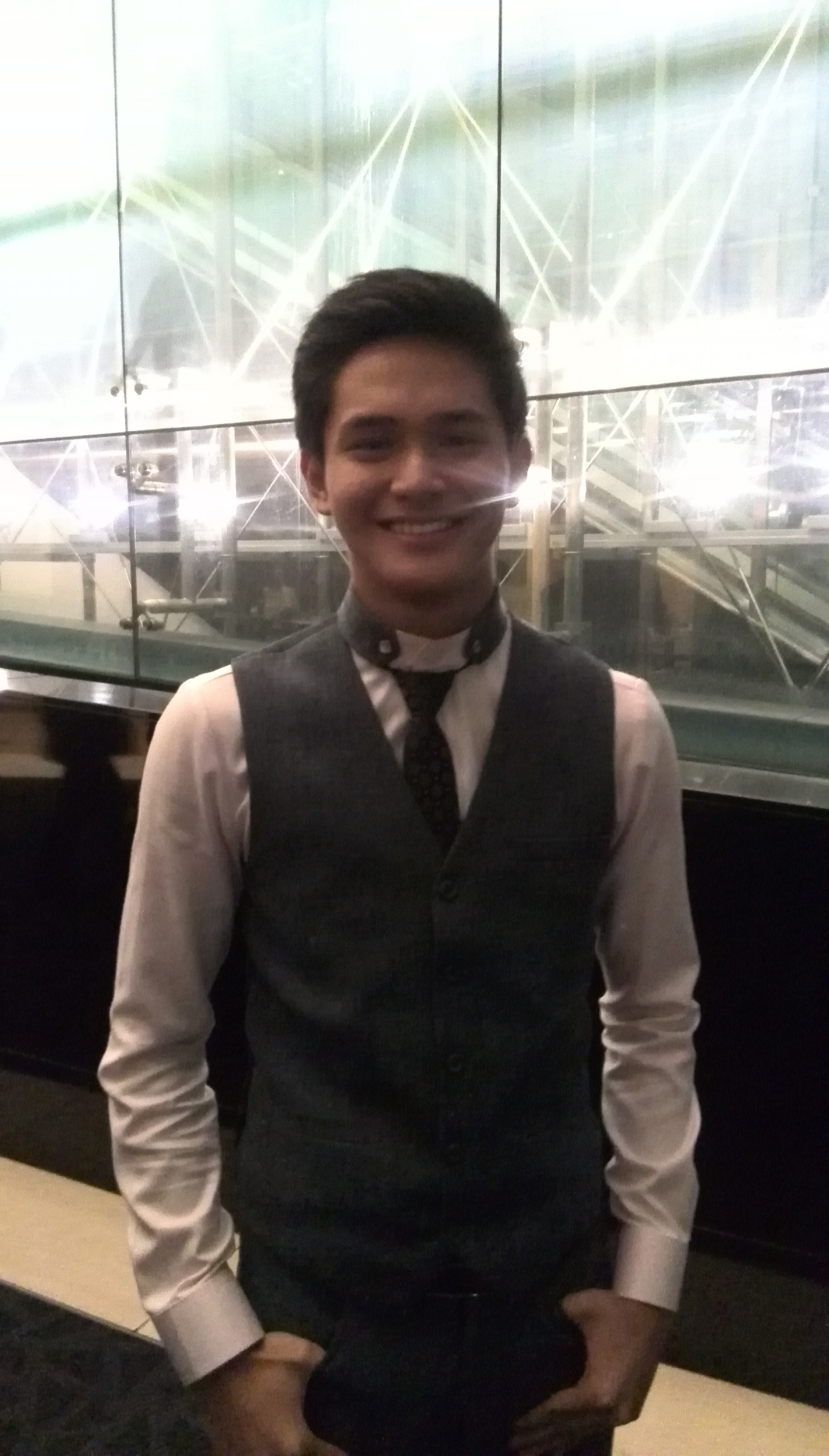
Ruru Madrid

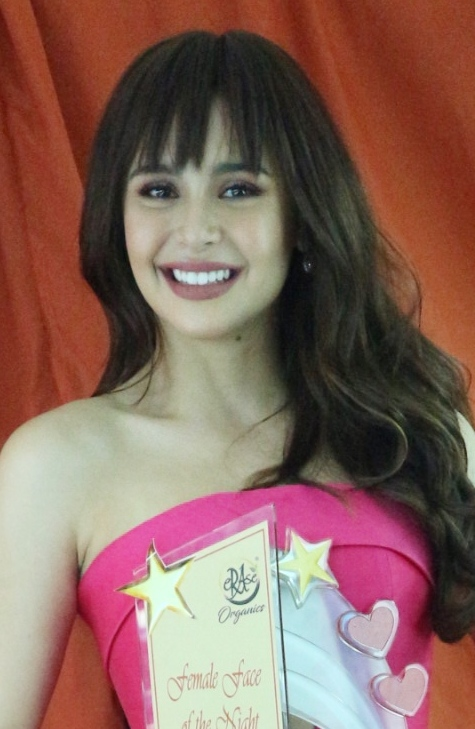
Yassi Pressman

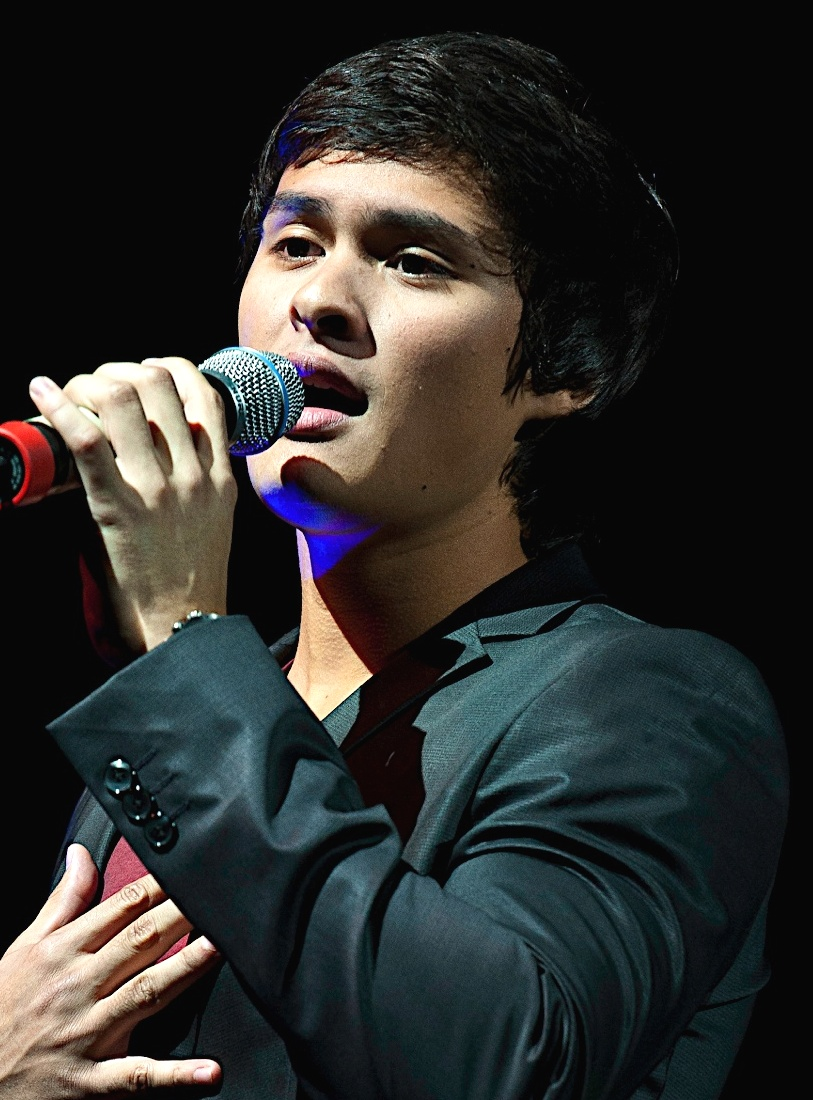
Matteo Guidicelli

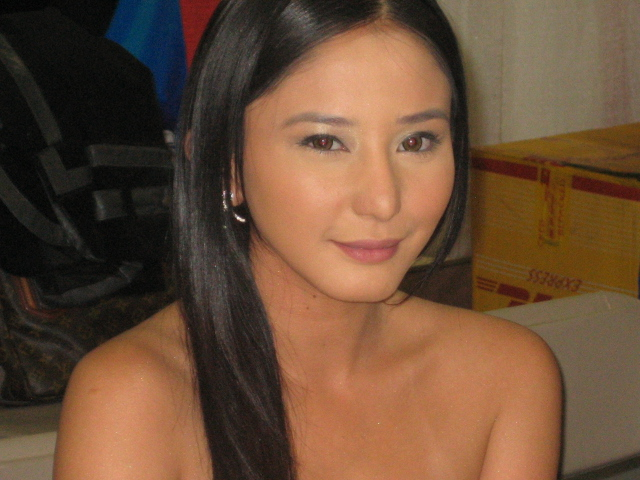
Katrina Halili

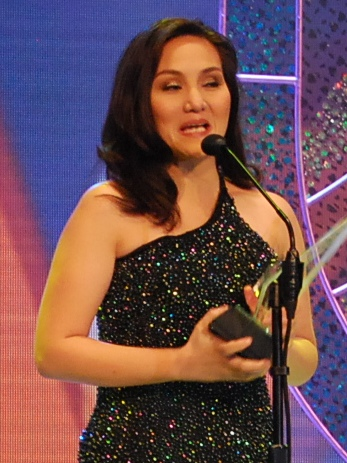
Gladys Reyes

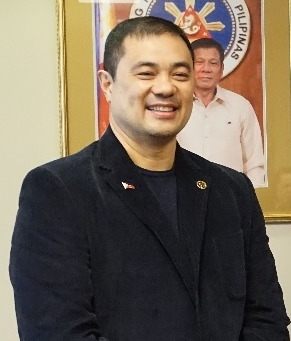
Monsour del Rosario

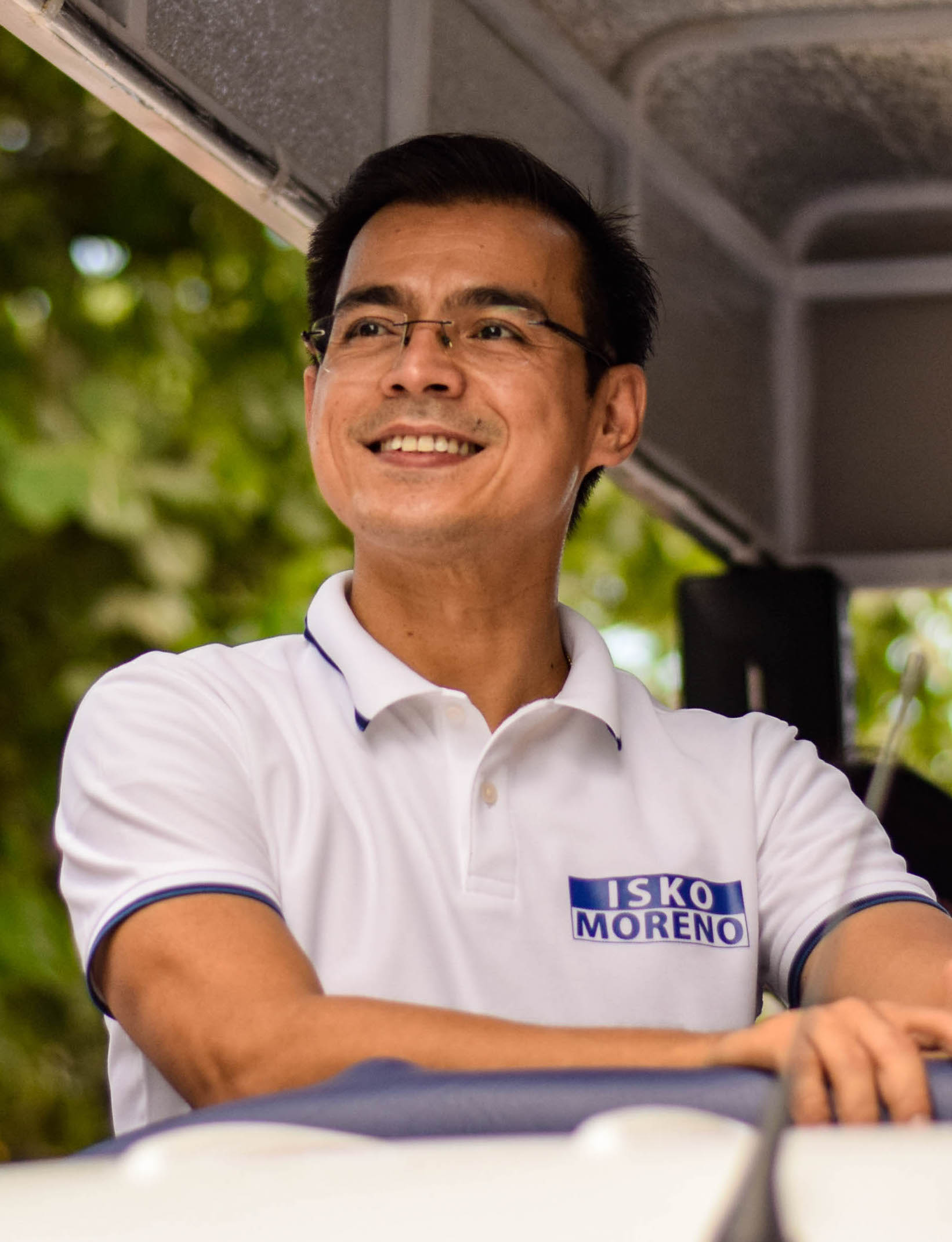
Isko Moreno

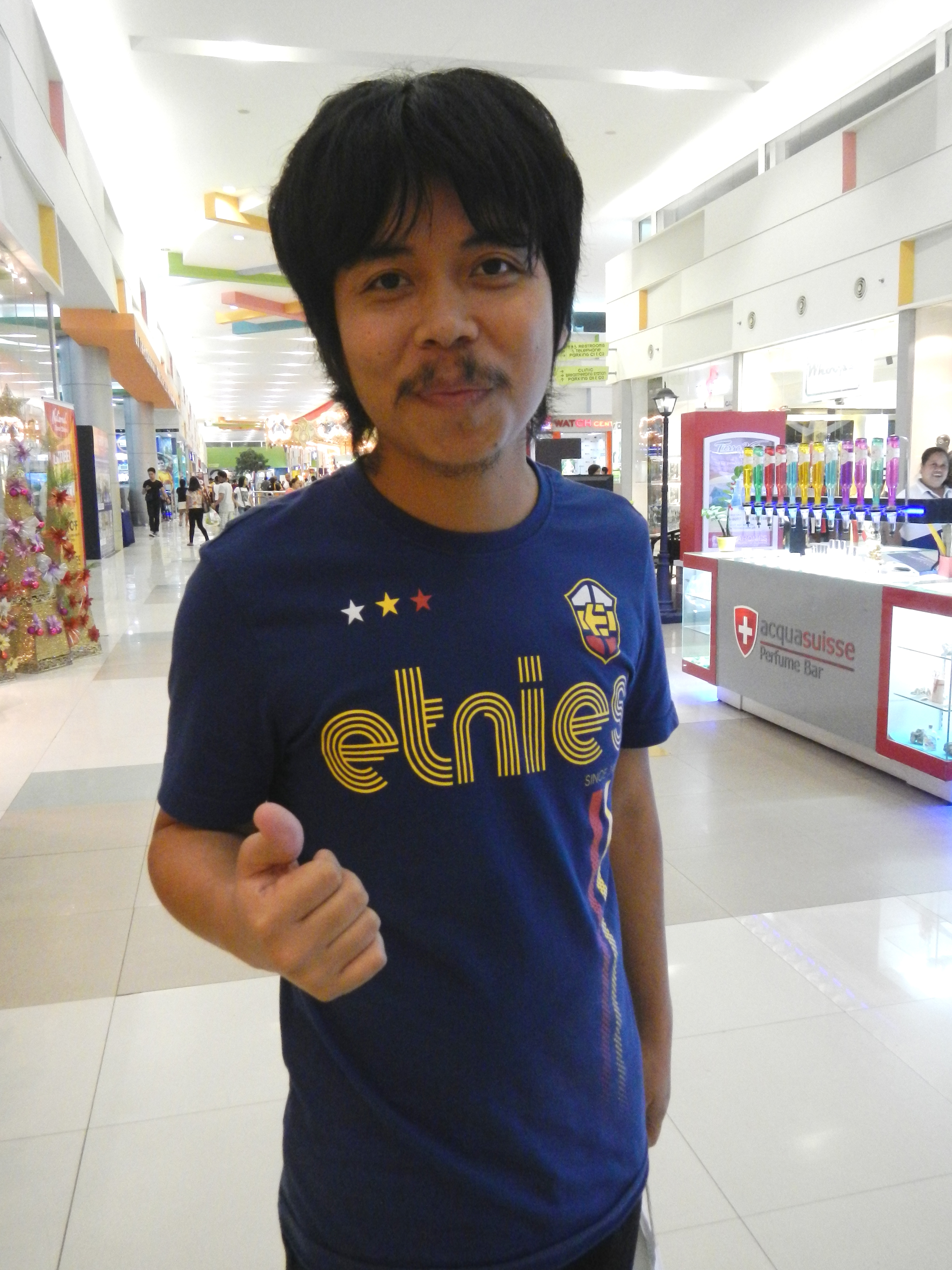
Empoy Marquez

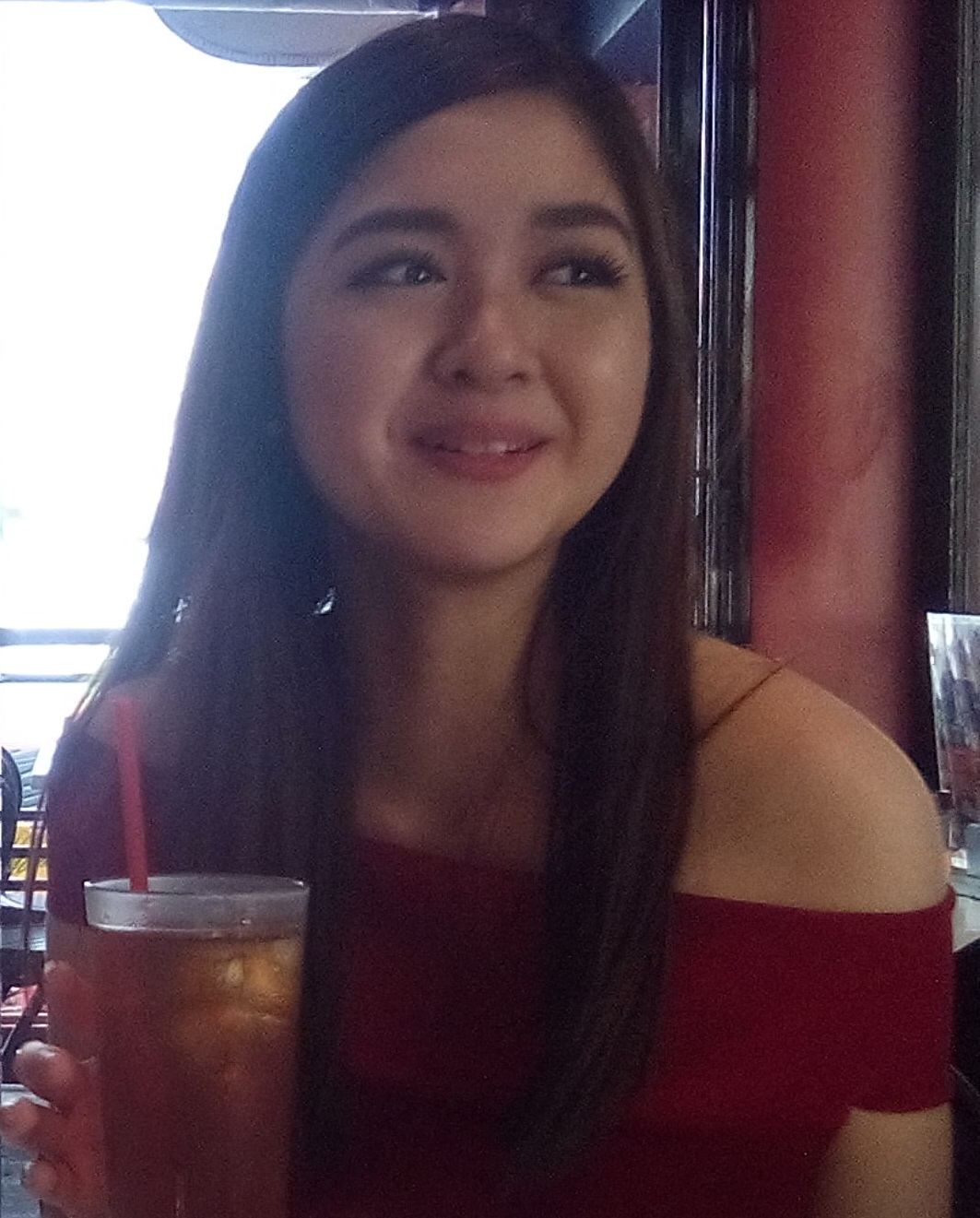
Mariel Pamintuan

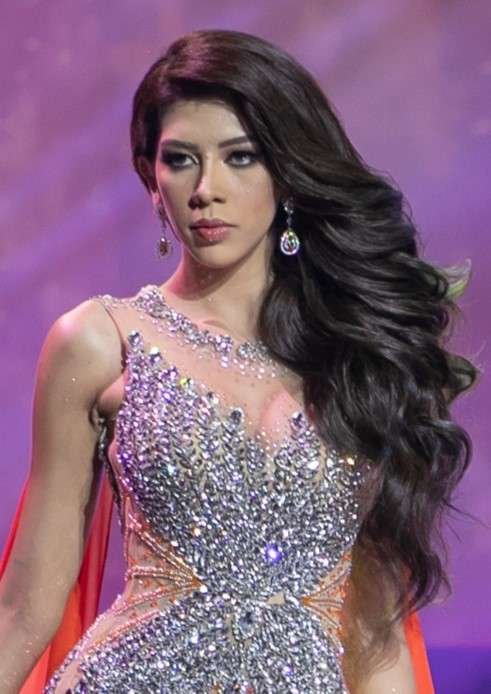
Herlene Budol

Lead cast

- Ruru Madrid as Elias P. Guerrero / Black Rider

Supporting cast

- Yassi Pressman as Vanessa "Bane" Bartolome / Vanessa Romero
- Matteo Guidicelli as Rafael "Paeng" Policarpio
- Katrina Halili as Rona Marie Ana "Romana" Nadela-Tolentino
- Jon Lucas as Calvin Magallanes / Abel Rodriguez / Dindo Chen
- Arra San Agustin as Joan Uy
- Zoren Legaspi as Alfonso Buenaventura
- Gladys Reyes as Sasha Buenaventura
- Raymart Santiago as Gregorio Ricarte
- Gary Estrada as Wilfredo "Fredo" Policarpio
- Monsour del Rosario as Nolan Garcia Alvarez
- Roi Vinzon as William Romero
- Raymond Bagatsing as Edgardo Magallanes / Carlos Legaspi
- Isko Moreno as Santiago "Tiagong" Dulas
- Rio Locsin as Alma Guerrero
- Maureen Larrazabal as Babylyn C. Reyes
- Almira Muhlach as Rebecca Chen
- Empoy Marquez as Oscar "Oka" Santos
- Jayson Gainza as Ernesto "Estong" P. Gomez
- Janus del Prado as Miguelito Sanchez
- Rainier Castillo as Kim Arthur
- Shanti Dope as Buboy Castillo
- Prince Clemente as Jonathan "Onat" Perez
- Luis Hontiveros as Philip Romero
- Joaquin Manansala as Ivan Castro
- Dustin Yu as Timothy Geronimo
- Saviour Ramos as Pablo Armas
- Vance Larena as Uno Martinez
- Kim Perez as Mattias Blanco
- Aleck Bovick as Lorna Santos-Dimaculangan
- Bodjie Pascua as Luisito "Lolo Sito" Nakpil
- Marco Masa as Benjamin "Benjie" Nakpil
- Ashley Sarmiento as Nerissa "Neneng" Bartolome
- Archie Adamos as Hugo
- Mariel Pamintuan as Angelica "Angie" Reyes
- Simon Ibarra as Hernando "Hernan" Bartolome
- Janiel Bucud as Bunjoy Tolentino
- Migs Villasis as Julio
- Kiel Rodriguez as Rommel "Mel"
- Pipay Kipay as Apol Pie
- Turing as Cherry Pie
- Salome Salvi as Annabel
- Dagul as Tuklaw
- Long Mejia as Benok
- Herlene Budol as Marikit "Pretty" Calaguas
- Jkhriez Pastrana as Inday
- Joaquin Domagoso as Lando
- Jeffrey Santos as Jemuel Chen
- Jestoni Alarcon as Antonio "Amang" Rodriguez
- Chanda Romero as Salvacion Valerio

Guest cast

- Kylie Padilla as Bernice A. Guerrero
- Joem Bascon as Jasper Alvarez
- Phillip Salvador as Mariano
- Carla Abellana as Becky
- Kier Legaspi as Sonny
- Susan Enriquez as a reporter
- Carlos Agassi as Echavez
- Ariella Arida as Therese Soriano
- Mico Aytona as Peralta
- Elle Ramirez as Blessie
- Dani Ozaraga as Marie
- Jet Alcantara as Samboy
- Queenzy Calma as Andrea A. Guerrero
- Euleen Castro as a bystander
- Kween Yasmin as a bystander
- Jett Pangan as Richard Uy
- Via Veloso as Estella Uy
- Tonio Quiazon as Raul Mendoza
- Analyn Barro as a victim
- Lucho Ayala as Carlo
- Via Antonio as Tinay
- Luri Vincent Nalus as Roel
- Ava Mendez as Ruby
- Haley Dizon as a club girl
- Robb Guinto as Sabel
- Fabio Ide as Romanov
- Carlo Lorenzo as a reporter
- Michael Flores as Bayawak
- Marcus Madrigal as Nato
- Dex Quindoza as Samuel
- Andrea Del Rosario as Belle
- Elijah Alejo as younger Vanessa
- Faye Lorenzo as Tricia
- Jay Arcilla as Hilario
- Ervic Vijandre as Hector Santos-Dimaculangan
- Bryan Benedict as a rival syndicate group member
- Jemwell Ventinilla as a thief
- Jay Glorioso as Joan's grandmother
- Lai Austria as Mercy
- Ashley Ortega as a car show girl
- Limuel Llanes as Hector's friend
- Tom Olivar as Omar
- Jenzel Angeles as a car show girl
- Joshua Dionisio as Carl P. Gomez
- Jim Pebanco as Narding
- Ashley Rivera as Paloma Nadela
- Emmanuel dela Cruz as a condo developer
- Jeniffer Maravilla as Joan's friend
- Wilbert Tolentino as Wilford Bernardo
- Claire Castro as Joan's friend
- Arnold Reyes as Romana's husband
- Divine Tetay as Bebemon
- Bianca Manalo as Hanna
- Tart Carlos as Claire
- Chlaui Malayao as Ayamae "Ayong" Santos
- Rowena Concepcion as Janet
- Ryan Eigenmann as Dante Aguilero
- Jong Cuenco as Marcelo Aguilero
- Kenjie Villacorte as Efren Salvacion
- Vic Romano as Lucio
- Michelle Dee as Teresa Soriano
- Don Umali as Narvarte
- Shermaine Santiago as Manda
- Angelica Jones as Janine Lagdameo
- Charlie Fleming as Sophie Lagdameo
- Marnie Lapus as Tanya Jacinto
- Yasser Marta as younger Edgardo
- Elora Españo as younger Alma
- Gerard Pizzaras as Conrado
- Michael Roy Jornales as Chito
- Francis Mata as Kalbo
- John Rex as Bobet
- Sue Prado as Rose
- David Remo as Jamboy
- Barbara Miguel as April
- Alvin Fortuna as Melchor
- Vangie Castillo as Glenda
- Abed Green as Bingo
- Dave Bornea as Pato
- Seb Pajarillo as Utak
- Rolly Inocencio as Advincula
- Rita Avila as Rosa Rodriguez
- Yayo Aguila as Hilda Magallanes
- Leandro Baldemor as Paquito "Tirador" Armas
- DJ Durano as Olivares "Bokal" Geronimo
- Paolo Paraiso as Saturnino "Diablo" Blanco
- Lander Vera Perez as Damian "Palong" Castro
- Gerald Madrid as Badong "Matador" Martinez
- Bernard Palanca as Emilio
- Crystal Paras as Andresa
- Buboy Villar as Odeng
- Biboy Ramirez as Balas
- Avery Mariane Sucgang
- William Lorenzo as Jojo Guerrero
- Yul Servo as Miguel Rosales
- Epy Quizon as Sonny
- Matet De Leon as Belen
- Angeli Khang as Nimfa
- Jillian Ward as Analyn Santos
- Lianne Valentin as Grace
- Luke Conde as younger William
- Jerry O'Hara as Mario
- BJ Forbes as younger Mario
- Madam Inutz as Gina
- Polo Ravales as Anselmo De Vera-Libanan
- Angela Alarcon as Aileen
- Benhur Abalos as himself
- Sheila Marie Rodriguez as Gemma
- Maita Soriano
- Joseph Ison
- Lexi Gonzales as Kakay
- Charm Aranton as Keka
- Bong Russo as Dindo
- Inah Evans as Dyosa
- Tito Mars as Venus
- Rubi Rubi as Venus' assistant
- Cherry Madrigal as Trining
- Jeric Raval as Alvaro Rodriguez
- Ji Soo as Adrian Park
- Jak Roberto as Moises / Calvin Magallanes (real)

== Development ==
In January 2023, Black Rider was announced as part of GMA Network's 2023 line up. Monti Parungao was originally announced to helm the series. Rommel Penesa and Richard Arellano later took over as his replacement. Erwin Tagle serves as an action director.

== Casting ==
In April 2024, actress Jillian Ward made a cameo appearance as Analyn Santos, who originated from the Philippine television medical drama series Abot-Kamay na Pangarap.

== Production ==
Principal photography commenced on July 4, 2023.

== Ratings ==
According to AGB Nielsen Philippines' Nationwide Urban Television Audience Measurement People in Television Homes, the pilot episode of Black Rider earned a 12.1% rating. The final episode scored a 15.6% rating.

== Accolades ==
Accolades received by Black Rider
Year	Award	Category	Recipient	Result	Ref.
2024	New York Festivals TV & Film Awards	Entertainment Program: Drama	Black Rider	Bronze	
2024	18th Gandingan Awards	Most Development-Oriented Drama Program	Black Rider	Won	
2024	5th VP Choice Awards	TV Series of the Year (Primetime)	Black Rider	Nominated	
2024	5th VP Choice Awards	TV Supporting Actor of the Year	Jon Lucas	Won	
2025	38th PMPC Star Awards for Television	Best Drama Actor	Ruru Madrid	Nominated	
2025	38th PMPC Star Awards for Television	Best Drama Supporting Actor	Jon Lucas	Nominated	
2025	38th PMPC Star Awards for Television	Best New Female TV Personality	Angeli Khang	Nominated	
2025	38th PMPC Star Awards for Television	Best New Female TV Personality	Salome Salvi	Nominated	
2025	38th PMPC Star Awards for Television	Best Primetime TV Series	Black Rider	Nominated	
2025	37th PMPC Star Awards for Television	Best Drama Actor	Ruru Madrid	Nominated	
2025	37th PMPC Star Awards for Television	Best Drama Supporting Actress	Rio Locsin	Nominated	
2025	37th PMPC Star Awards for Television	Best Drama Supporting Actress	Gladys Reyes	Nominated	

== Legacy ==
In April 2024, actors Ruru Madrid, Empoy Marquez and actress Herlene Budol all appeared in the Philippine television medical drama series Abot-Kamay na Pangarap in a guest role, portraying the same character they played in Black Rider.
