= Atsushi Matsuura (musician) =

Japanese guitarist (born 1968)

- Also known as: Sushi
- Born: May 10, 1968 (age 56); Shiojiri, Nagano, Japan
- Genres: Rock
- Years active: 1988–present
- Labels: Ivory Records; PolyEast Records Philippines (formerly OctoArts International); Sony BMG Music Philippines; Warner Music Philippines
- Website: www.matsuura.ph

Atsushi Matsuura (松浦 篤志, Matsuura Atsushi, born 10 May 1968) is a Japanese guitarist born in Shiojiri, Nagano, Japan. He currently resides in the Philippines.

== Early life ==
Matsuura attended primary school at the Manila Japanese School, an exclusive school for children of Japanese expatriates in the Philippines at that time. He went back to his home country for senior high. He transferred to the International School in Manila a year after, where he graduated in 1986. He again returned to Japan and attended Sophia University in Tokyo for college.

Music came naturally to Matsuura. His grandfather played violin and his mom, Hiroko Matsuura the piano. He took piano lessons at the age of 7, attending Electone (Yamaha Electric Organ) classes until 11 years of age. Just a lesson away from course completion, he shifted his interest to guitars. At age 12, he would own his very first electric guitar. He stuck to playing the instrument even after taking drum lessons.

== Career ==
In December 1988, Matsuura went back to the Philippines for vacation. Earlier that year, he released a solo album entitled Incubus, which was distributed by Ivory Music. While doing some gigs in connection with the solo album, he was introduced to a band which had lost its founding guitarist Teddy Diaz, who was murdered.

In 1989, Matsuura would officially join The Dawn, one of the most popular local rock bands of that period, having spawned hits such as "Salamat" and "Hey, Isabel".

He left the music scene from 1990–1999. During this period, he set up two companies providing business assistance and information technology consultancy mainly to Japanese individuals and companies in Manila. He rejoined The Dawn in late 1999 when the band reunited, playing in key cities in the Philippines, an 8-city concert tour in the United States and a music festival in Ho Chi Minh City, Vietnam. Matsuura quit the band in the last quarter of 2004, after three studio albums and a live album.

Also in 2004, Matsuura joined the band Mah’tiggahz (which means "matigas" or "hard").

Mah’tiggahz is composed of Atsushi Matsuura on guitars, Mon Legaspi (of Wolfgang and The Dawn) on bass, Bennii Obaña on drums, Jeremy Aguado on lead vocals and Perf de Castro (of Rivermaya and TriAxis) also on guitars.

== Influences and musical preferences ==
He considers Shinichiro Ishihara (guitarist of the Japanese band, Earthshaker), Gary Moore, Yngwie Malmsteen and John Norum his musical influences. Rock, however, has not prevented him from liking a variety of genres. He also listens to pop music (M2M), operatic pop (Sarah Brightman), trance (Paul Van Dyk), jazz (Hiromi) and Japanese pop singer Aiko, among many others.

== Discography ==
As solo artist

- Incubus (1988)

The Dawn

- Beyond the Bend (1989)
- Prodigal Sun (2000)
- Harapin (2004)
- Tulad Ng Dati (2006)

== See also ==
- The Dawn
