= The Dawn (band) =

Filipino rock band

- The Dawn ca. late 80's (L-R, front to rear) the late Teddy Diaz (guitar), Jett Pangan (vocals), JB Leonor (drums) and Carlos Balcells (bass guitar)

Background information
- Origin: Manila, Philippines
- Genres: Pinoy rock; new wave (early work)
- Years active: 1985–1995; 1999–present (one-off reunion in 1997)
- Labels: MCA Music; Sony BMG Philippines; Warner Music Philippines; Ivory Music & Video; PolyEast Records; Solstice Ventures, Inc.
- Members: JB Leonor; Jett Pangan; Francis Reyes; Rommel Sanchez; Bim Yance
- Past members: Teddy Diaz; Clay Luna; Atsushi Matsuura; Kenneth Ilagan; Buddy Zabala; Carlos Balcells; Mon Legaspi

The Dawn is a Filipino rock band which first achieved commercial success during the late 1980s in the Philippines. The band broke up in 1995 with lead vocalist Jett Pangan forming another band, the Jett Pangan Group. The Dawn reunited in late 1999. The Dawn is considered the "longest-lived and most prolific rock band in the Philippines".

== History ==
=== Formation and early years (1985–1988) ===
The Dawn was formed in 1985 by Teddy Diaz (vocals and guitars), JB Leonor (drums), and Clay Luna (bass). The band's name was derived from a portrait of the Holy Spirit that symbolized the dawn of a new day (probably found in a book given by the Sisters of the Holy Spirit to Teddy Diaz, as well as a crucifix which Teddy also received from the same sisterhood), called The Dawning of the Holy Spirit. Diaz, Leonor and Luna initially wanted a female vocalist; but in the course of their search, Jett Pangan auditioned and got the trio's unanimous nod. The quartet began performing in clubs and eventually recorded a demo of a song entitled "Enveloped Ideas", a copy of which they submitted to DWXB 102.7, a now-defunct Metro Manila-based FM radio station that played alternative rock and new wave music. It topped the radio station's charts in 1986, helping the group gain a cult following. While The Dawn was in search of a major record label, Luna left the band to immigrate to the US. Carlos "Caloy" Balcells, bass player of another Filipino group, the Cicada Band, soon replaced him. In 1986, The Dawn signed with OctoArts International (now PolyEast Records Philippines) and, the next summer, released their self-titled debut album, which gained commercial success. Many critics felt that The Dawn would fill the void left behind by the Juan de la Cruz Band when their music slowly faded in the 1980s. Heavily influenced by the new wave genre of the 1980s, "Enveloped Ideas" is distinct for its introductory operatic vocals a la Klaus Nomi.

=== Diaz's death, new guitarist, later albums and disbandment (1988–1995) ===
At the height of their popularity, and just weeks after the release of their second album I Stand with You (1988), containing the title track, Magtanim Ay 'Di Biro ("Planting Rice") and "Love (Will Set Us Free)", Diaz was stabbed to death in front of his girlfriend's house on 21 August 1988 by two men allegedly under the influence of drugs and alcohol. Despite the demise of Diaz, his influence is still felt among many guitarists today and he has become a legend among many Filipino musicians. The Dawn has been considering Diaz to be the band's driving force. The songs "The Moon", "Let Me Dance", "Wish You Were Here", "I Stand with You", "I'm Not Hurting Anymore" and Magtanim ay 'Di Biro ("Planting Rice") were performed at Concert at the Park in Luneta (now Rizal Park). The back cover of the album has pictures of the band.

The band continued to play, at one time employing the services of a masked guitarist (nicknamed "Zorro" by some fans - is actually rock guitar virtuoso Noel Mendez who will eventually form the band HAYP) in the absence of a permanent guitar player. Atsushi Matsuura, a Japanese guitarist who had earlier released a solo album in the Philippines under Ivory Records, took on lead guitar duties in January 1989 as the band released Beyond the Bend. Matsuura was featured on the music video of "Salamat".

He was later replaced by Francis Reyes, former Afterimage guitarist, who was also a DJ at NU-107, a local alternative rock radio station. Reyes also happened to be Diaz's close friend. Classically trained session keyboardist Millette Saldajeno also joined the band in 1990 but was later replaced by Isidore Fernandez in 1992.

The band released their sixth album, Puno't Dulo (Filipino, "The Beginning and the End"), on July 28, 1994. It was the last album the band released before their split. the band reunited in 2000.

In 1995, the band went their separate ways due to Pangan's desire to move on with another career. Pangan then formed the Jett Pangan Group.

The 1997 reunion at the ULTRA brought the band back on-stage and, for the first time, the band employed two guitarists: Matsuura and Reyes. They did another reunion show at the now defunct ABG's along Pasong Tamo, while they were discussing a comeback release through Sony Music Philippines (now Sony BMG Music Philippines).

=== Reunion, US shows, Prodigal Sun and Harapin (1999–2005) ===
On 31 December 1999, they reunited with both Francis Reyes and Atsushi Matsuura on guitars and performed on GMA Networks' 2000 Global Millennium Day Broadcast in Ayala Avenue in Makati. That year, they also recorded Prodigal Sun which was released on 2001, an album that, much like the parable of the Prodigal Son, symbolized their return to the music scene.

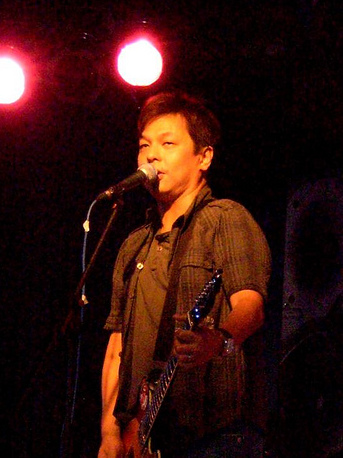
Jett Pangan performing onstage

2001 saw the band actively engaged in the live circuit, embarking on an eight-city US tour and were in New York City when 9/11 turned the World Trade Center into ground zero. In 2003, Carlos Balcells left the band in order to perform his duties as city councilor in his native Talisay City, Negros Occidental. Wolfgang's bass player Mon Legaspi took his place in the band. A few months later, the band once again parted with Matsuura and returned to being a quartet.

In 2004, the band released Harapin (Filipino, "To Face"), featuring singles such as Tulad ng Dati ("Just Like Before") and Laging Narito ("Always Here"). In October 2005, bass player Mon Legaspi amicably left the band to pursue other projects and was replaced by Buddy Zabala, formerly of The Eraserheads. Around this time, The Dawn also contributed to the APO Hiking Society tribute album kami nAPO muna with a cover of Bawat Bata ("Every Child"). It's the last album to feature guitarist Atsushi Matsuura who left the band a month before the album release, and the only album to feature Bassist Mon Legaspi who left a year later and eventually returned in 2016.

=== Tulad ng Dati, Later Half of Day (2006–2009) ===
In 2006, an independent film based on the band's history was released. Tulad Ng Dati (Just Like Before, as entitled in the Pusan International Film Festival) won Best Editing, Best Sound, and Best Picture in the Cinemalaya Independent Film Festival. It was also the country's entry to the Hawaii International Film Festival. The Dawn's 20th anniversary album, a two-disc set of the same title, was released in October of the same year. Disc one contains re-recordings of their hits through the years and the carrier single Ang Iyong Paalam ("Your Farewell"), while disc two contains videos, including rare footage of Teddy Diaz doing a guitar solo. In October 2008, The Dawn launched their tenth studio album, The Later Half of Day, their first album in two years since the last released in 2006. It featured jazz re-arrangements of their old songs.

=== Reyes' departure, Sound the Alarm (2009–2013) ===
Francis Reyes, who had been with the band for the last 18 years, left on 16 April 2009 after what Jett Pangan called a "hard meeting". Pangan also went on to state that Reyes was welcome to rejoin the band. He was replaced by Kenneth Ilagan, days later. In July 2009, the band launched their eleventh studio album, Sound the Alarm. The album features Kenneth Ilagan, formerly of True Faith and Xaga (a precursor to Rivermaya).

=== Sancho's arrival, Simulan na Natin EP (2013–2015) ===
In 2013 in a Myx.com interview, Pangan stated, "I think I'm gonna write more songs". On 14 July 2014, they released a new single entitled "Habulan". Guitarist Rommel "Sancho" Sanchez, known as a member of Cynthia Alexander's band joined the Dawn on 8 August 2014. Sanchez's first performance with the Dawn was at the Music Museum. This event marked the launch of their new single "Landmarks". On 9 December 2015, the Dawn was awarded the Dangal ng Musikang Pilipino at the 2015 Awit Awards held at the Music Museum. They released their first EP, Simulan Na Natin on 16 December 2015 which was available in record stores and then on 10 January 2016 through iTunes. On 10 February 2016, the band launched their YouTube channel which also launched a new music video for "The Way It Turns".

=== Band members' return, anniversary shows, Ascendant, and Legaspi's death (2016–2022) ===
On 7 June 2016, the band underwent another line-up change as bassist Buddy Zabala left the band for unknown reasons, while bassist Carlos Balcells and guitarist Francis "Brew" Reyes were brought back, thus returning as a quintet for the first time since 2004.

By the later dates in June and July 2016, Mon Legaspi briefly returned to the band filling bass duties for Balcells who was unavailable at that time. Legaspi would begin touring with them months later and would eventually be the band's regular bassist and Balcells being mostly pre-occupied with their family businesses. This year would also mark the band's 30th anniversary. In line with the celebrations, they held a concert last 17 September 2016 dubbed The Dawn Trenta at Craft BGC in Taguig City. They would later perform at the Trenta Repeat concert on 5 November 2016 at the Music Museum. They would perform a follow-up to their 30th anniversary concert dubbed "Trenta y Uno" on 31 March and also announced they will be having a US and Canada tour on the third quarter of the year.

On 11 October 2017, vocalist Jett Pangan made a Facebook post that the band had begun writing and recording for their upcoming 12th studio album. The band released the songs "Merry Go Round" and Segurista ("Security") as well as the album Ascendant by way of a major concert at The Music Museum on 28 July 2018 with the newest song being "Made of You".

On October 3, 2022, bassist Mon Legaspi died at the age of 54 due to cardiac arrest.

=== New members, Almost 40, and new singles (2023–present) ===
Following Legaspi's death, bassist Bim Yance joined The Dawn, first as a touring member in 2023 and then as a full member by 2023, helping sustain the band's rhythm section into the present day.

More recently, the band has put out a steady stream of singles that resonate with both longtime fans and new listeners. These include "Earth" (2023), and their first Christmas single Maki-Pasko ("Christmas Time") (2024), which marked a new creative direction and was released after the band signed with Sony Music Philippines. The festive track reflects the band’s seasonal reflections and personal experiences of the holidays.

In January 2025, The Dawn announced their special anniversary concert titled "Almost 40", commemorating nearly four decades of music at the Music Museum in San Juan City on February 22, 2025.

In 2025, The Dawn released additional singles including "Missing Hearts", Sa'n Ka Pupunta? ("Where Are You Going?"), and Delikado ("Dangerous"), a collaborative track featuring newbie artist Sean Archer, highlighting the band's continued relevance and creative evolution more than four decades after their formation.

== Band members ==
Current members

- JB Leonor – drums (1985–1995, 1999–present, one-off show in 1997)
- Jett Pangan – lead vocals, guitar, keyboards (1985–1995, 1999–present, one-off show in 1997)
- Francis Reyes – guitars, backing vocals, keyboards (1990–1995, 1999–2009, 2016–present, one-off show in 1997)
- Rommel Sanchez – guitars (2014–present)
- Bim Yance – bass (2023–present; touring 2022–2023)

Former members

- Clay Luna – bass (1985)
- Teddy Diaz – vocals, guitars, keyboards (1985–1988, his death)
- Atsushi Matsuura – guitars, backing vocals, keyboards (1989, 1999–2004, one-off show in 1997)
- Kenneth Ilagan – guitar (2009–2014, one-off show in 2026)
- Buddy Zabala – bass, backing vocals (2005–2016, one-off show in 2026)
- Carlos Balcells – bass, backing vocals (1985–1995, 1999–2003, 2016–2017, one-off show in 1997, 2026)
- Mon Legaspi – bass, backing vocals (2003–2005, 2017–2022, his death; touring 2016–2017)

Former touring/session members

- Noel Mendez (a.k.a. Zorro) – guitar (1988)
- Millette Saldajeno – keyboards (1990–1992)
- Dodo Fernandez – keyboards (1992–1995, 1999–2002)
- Kit Mendoza – guitar (2014)
- Leni Llapitan – keyboards (2002–2017)
- Kurt Floresca – drums (2023–present)

Timeline

== Filmography ==
=== Television ===
- 1988: Martin After Dark (Jett, JB, Carlos, Teddy)
- 1994: 1st NU Rock Awards (Jett, JB, Carlos, Francis)
- 1997: SOP (Jett, JB, Carlos, Francis, Atsushi)
- 1999: 6th NU Rock Awards (Jett, JB, Atsushi)
- 2007: The ARAW Values Advertising Awards (Jett, JB, Francis, Buddy)
- 2015: Kapamilya, Deal or No Deal (Jett, the Briefcase Number 6)
- 2015: It's Showtime (Jett, JB, Rommel, Buddy)
- 2015: Binibining Pilipinas 2015: The Road to the Crown - Pre-Pageant Special (Jett, JB, Rommel, Buddy)
- 2016: Unang Hirit (Jett, JB, Rommel, Buddy)
- 2016: NET25 Letters and Music (Jett, Rommel)
- 2016: It's Showtime (Jett, JB, Rommel, Francis)
- 2019: Studio 7 (Jett, JB, Rommel, Francis, Mon)
- 2019: It's Showtime (Jett, Rommel, Francis, Mon, with guest drummer Kurt Floresca)
- 2021: Tulong-Tulong sa Pag-ahon (Jett, Rommel)
- 2022: Family Feud (Jett, Rommel, Francis, with Carlos Orosa)
- 2022: It's Showtime: Magpasikat 2022 (Francis)
- 2023: It's Showtime (Jett, JB, Rommel, Francis, Bim)
- 2023: 2023 FIBA Basketball World Cup: Opening Ceremony (Jett, JB, Rommel, Francis, Bim)
- 2023: It's Showtime: Magpasikat 2023 (Jett)
- 2025: Eat Bulaga! (Jett, JB, Rommel, Francis, Bim)
- 2025: All-Out Sundays (Jett, JB, Rommel, Francis, Bim)
- 2025: Vibe (Jett, JB, Rommel, Francis, Bim)

=== Film ===
- 1987: Olongapo: The Great American Dream (Jett, JB, Carlos, Teddy)
- 1994: Mama's Boys 2 (Let's Go Na!) (Jett, JB, Carlos, Francis)
- 2006: Tulad ng Dati (Jett, JB, Francis, Buddy, Carlos)

=== Webcast ===
- 2024: 9th Wish Music Awards (Jett, Francis)

== Discography ==
=== Studio albums ===
- The Dawn (1987), OctoArts International
- I Stand with You (1988), OctoArts International
- Beyond the Bend (1989), OctoArts International
- Heart's Thunder (1990), OctoArts International
- Abot Kamay (1992), OctoArts International
- Puno't Dulo (1994), OctoArts International
- Prodigal Sun (2000), Sony BMG Music
- Harapin (2004), Warner Music Philippines
- Tulad ng Dati (2006), Warner Music Philippines
- The Later Half of Day (2008), MCA Music Philippines
- Sound the Alarm (2009), Sony Music Philippines
- Ascendant (2018), Solstice Ventures Inc.

=== Compilation albums ===
- Iisang Bangka Tayo (1992), OctoArts International
- The Dawn: OPM Timeless Collection Gold Series (1997), OctoArts-EMI Music
- The Story of The Dawn: The Ultimate OPM Collection (2001), EMI Philippines

=== Live albums ===
- The Dawn: Live (1989), OctoArts International

=== Extended plays ===
- Simulan Na Natin (2015), Solstice Ventures Inc. (CD, iTunes)

=== Soundtrack ===
- "Hintayin Mo Ako" (1991) - Noel Juico, 16: Batang Kriminal
- "Tatak ng Latigo" (1991; uncredited) - Mayor Latigo
- "Saling Pusa" (1994) - Mama's Boys 2 (Let's Go Na!)
- "Tulad ng Dati", "Change is Breaking Us Apart", "Mad Game", "Traffic", "Love Will Set Us Free", "Little Paradise", "Salimpusa", "Push Forward", "Abot-Kamay", "Enveloped Ideas", "Dreams", "Harapin", "Iisang Bangka", "Salamat (Acoustic)" (2006) - Tulad ng Dati
- "Bawat Bata" (2006) - Kami nAPO Muna, Universal Records Philippines
- "Posporo" (2021) - Maalaala Mo Kaya: Tattoo

=== Music videos ===
- "Enveloped Ideas" (1986)
- "Salamat" (1989)
- "Iisang Bangka Tayo" (1992) - finalist as Best Southeast Asian Music Video at the 1992 MTV Music Video Awards
- "Paano Naman Kami" (2002)
- "Harapin ang Liwanag" (2004)
- "Change" (2004)
- "Tulad ng Dati" (2005)
- "Ang Iyong Paalam" (2006)
- "Message in a Bottle" (2008)
- "Hatak" (2009)
- "The Way It Turns" (2016)
- "Paraisong Tanso" (2016)
- "MerryGoRound" (2017)
- "Segurista" (2018)
- "Missing Hearts" (2025)
- "Sa'n Ka Pupunta" (2025)

== Awards and nominations ==
Year	Award giving body	Category	Nominated work	Results	Refs.
1989	2nd Awit Awards	Best Rock Recording	"Enveloped Ideas"	Won	
1992	MTV Video Music Awards	International Viewer's Choice: MTV Asia	"Iisang Bangka"	Nominated	
1993	6th Awit Awards	Best Rock Recording	"Iisang Bangka"	Won	
1994	NU Rock Awards	Best Live Act	—N/a	Won	
1994	NU Rock Awards	Rock Achievement Award	—N/a	Won	
1999	MTV Pilipinas Music Award	Tower Records Icon Award	—N/a	Won	
2001	NU Rock Awards	Artist of The Year	—N/a	Nominated	
2001	NU Rock Awards	Song of the Year	"I Saw You Coming In"	Nominated	
2001	NU Rock Awards	Album of the Year	"Prodigal Sun"	Nominated	
2001	NU Rock Awards	Vocalist of the Year	(for Jett Pangan)	Nominated	
2001	NU Rock Awards	Guitarist of the Year	(for Francis Reyes)	Nominated	
2001	NU Rock Awards	Bassist of the Year	(for Carlos Balcells)	Nominated	
2001	NU Rock Awards	Drummer of the Year	(for JB Leonor)	Nominated	
2005	18th Awit Awards	Best Alternative Music	"Tulad Ng Dati (Squid 9 Version)"	Nominated	
2005	NU Rock Awards	Vocalist of the Year	(for Jett Pangan)	Nominated	
2005	NU Rock Awards	Guitarist of the Year	(for Francis Reyes)	Nominated	
2005	NU Rock Awards	Bassist of the Year	(for Mon Legaspi)	Nominated	
2005	NU Rock Awards	Song of the Year	"Tulad Ng Dati"	Nominated	
2005	NU Rock Awards	Album of the Year	"Harapin"	Nominated	
2015	28th Awit Awards	Dangal ng Musikang Pilipino Award	—N/a	Won	
2024	9th Wish Music Awards	Wish Rock/Alternative Song of the Year	"Earth"	Nominated	
2024	37th Awit Awards	Best Rock/Metal Recording	"Earth"	Nominated	

=== Singles ===
"I Stand with You"
Year	Award giving body	Category	Nominated work	Result
2005	Nu 107.5 2004 Year End Countdown	Top 20 OPM Songs on the 2004 NU107 Countdown	"Harapin Ang Liwanag"	5th
2005	Nu 107.5 2004 Year End Countdown	Top 20 OPM Songs on the 2004 NU107 Countdown	"Tulad Ng Dati"	17th
2005	Nu 107.5 2004 Year End Countdown	Top 107 Songs for 2004 (ranked from #107 to #1)	"Harapin Ang Liwanag"	8th
2005	Nu 107.5 2004 Year End Countdown	Top 107 Songs for 2004 (ranked from #107 to #1)	"Tulad Ng Dati"	26th

=== Miscellaneous ===
- 2024: Eastwood City Walk of Fame

Awards
Preceded by New award	NU Rock Awards; Best Live Act; 1994	Succeeded by Put3ska
