= Lou Bonnevie =

Filipina musician

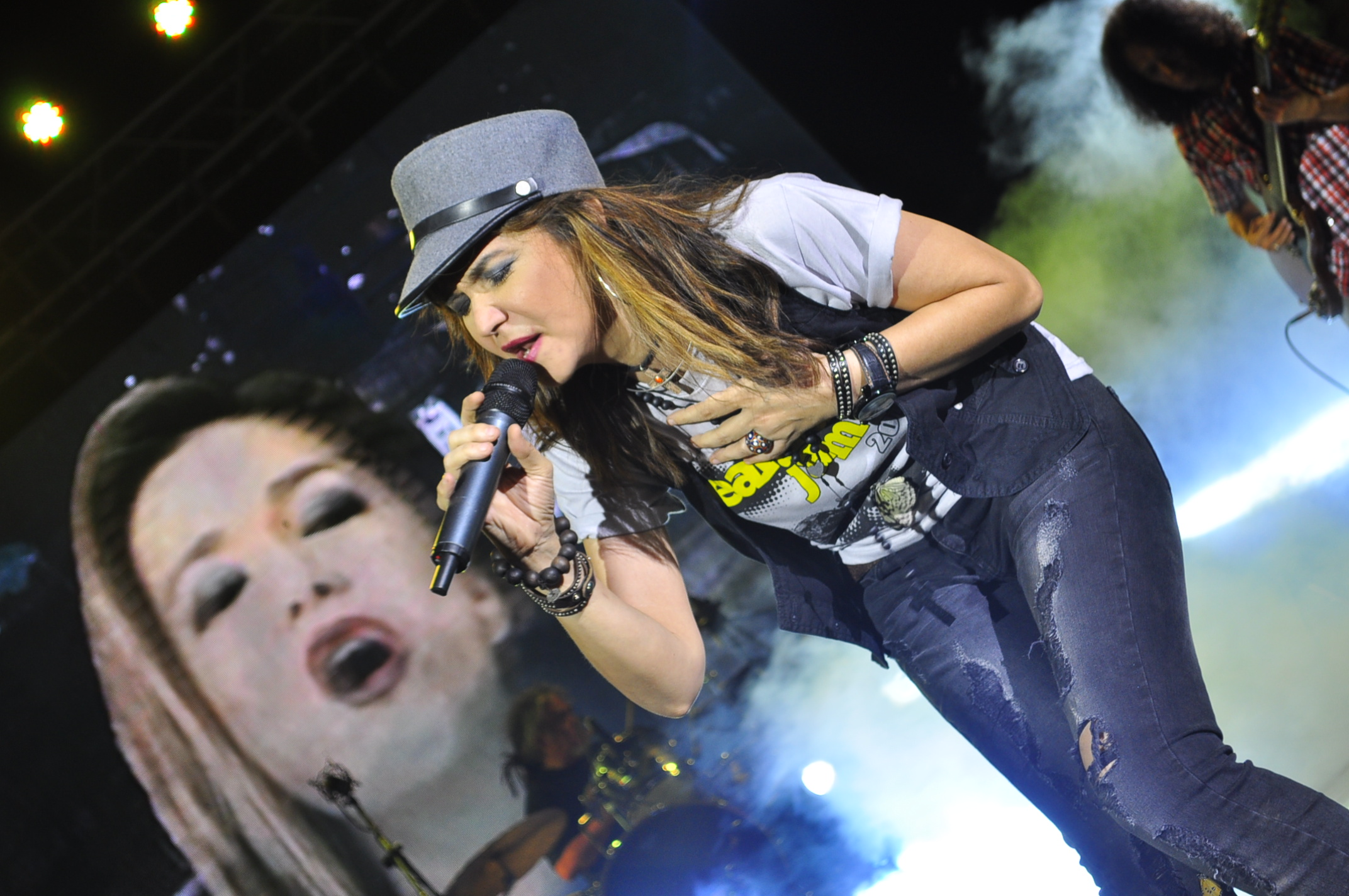
- Lou Bonnevie at Earth Day Jam 2013
- Born: Maria Lourdes Bonnevie; October 6, 1965 (age 60); Bicol, Philippines
- Other names: Lou, Marilou
- Occupations: Pop, rock
- Years active: 1984–present

Maria Lourdes Rosario Perello Bonnevie, better known by her stage name Lou Bonnevie (born October 6, 1965, in Bicol), is a Filipina pop rock musician. She has released several albums since the beginning of her career in 1984. Her music was also used in the AD Police OVA series in Japan. She is the first cousin of Dina Bonnevie. She attended University of Saint Anthony High School in Iriga City and University of Santo Tomas in España, Manila. She is of French and Spanish descent.

== Life ==
Bonnevie is the fifth child in a brood of seven. Her father is the youngest in the Bonnevie clan, whose ancestors migrated from France to Pasacao in Camarines Sur, Bicol. Her mother, who is of Filipino-Spanish lineage, hails from Manila. They were a traveling family that lived a country life with horses in ranches that her parents managed. Bonnevie showed her flair for music at an early age, singing in family gatherings and school events. She honed most of her musical skills in playing the guitar and composing songs during her primary schooling in Bicol. By the time her family moved to Manila in the 1980s, she was ready to perform professionally in small clubs and hotels as she continued her secondary and college studies. She was monickered “Twinkle” because of her hazel and captivating eyes. Her very first professional composition was a song called “Nawawalang Karapatan” (A Song Abhorring Abortion) which became a finalist in a Children’s Rights Competition.

== Career ==
In 1984 she launched her musical career via a music concert held that year, Next in Line.

Bonnevie has had hundreds of live shows, performing with the top Filipino artists and backed up by seasoned musicians both from the mainstream and alternative scenes. Venues vary from the hotel ballrooms and concert halls creating “concept shows” and "theatrical rock concerts" with multimedia productions to "jamming sessions" and "unplugged productions" in top rock clubs. Her repertoire consists of her originals plus re arrangements and adaptations of "soul", "rock & roll", "folk & blues" classics essayed in pop genre. Music has taken her all over the Philippines and abroad – She has toured with Gary Valenciano in the US and has done her own major shows in the Middle East (Bahrain, Dubai and Al-ain), Singapore and Japan. Lately, she toured several Asian countries in connection with her “Only Human” album promotions.

In 25 years, Bonnevie has recorded six major studio albums and one live album including 3 international releases, 3 Kareoke releases and 3 compilation releases. In 1984, she released her self-titled album Lou Bonnevie, produced and released by WEA Records. It spawned four hit songs—the fast tracks “I’m Every Girl” and "Rockin’ The Beat" and the rock ballads "What a Fool I Am” and "I Need Your Love." Her follow-up My World from WEA Records was released in 1986 and produced the nationwide hit song "Love Me Tonight" and the classic Tagalog ditty, ”Lagi Lagi Na Lang”. In the 1980s Bonnevie endorsed 7-up's version of "7up the difference is clear" with Kim Cranes' worldwide hit "Bette Davis Eyes" tune.

In 1985, she appeared in her first regular noontime show, “Eto Yun Ang Galing” as a HOST. In 1986, she debuted in her first comic acting shows in “Eh Kasi Babae” (with actor Michael De Mesa) and “Plaza 21 “ (with top comedian Dolphy) paving the way to her regular TV Musical show in Kuh Ledesma’s “Star Café” until 1987.

In 1992, Bonnevie together with husband/artist/music director Toto Gentica formed their own production house, Dimitri Productions (named after son Mikael Dimitri). In 1992 & 1993, she recorded “Your Love” in her own studio and released it under her independent record company, Sonata Records, and was distributed by Alpha Records. The single “Sleepless Nights” earned an AWIT awards nomination for the Best Rock Category. The classic original composition, “Sa ‘Yo Lamang” was also released. It is in the 1990s that Bonnevie became the endorser of international brand, Colgate, and sang the TV hit song “Get Electrical”. This became part of the album She Knows How to Rock, which was released under BMG Records in 1995. The album showcased Bonnevie’s raw energy and idealism and was presented with 4 and ½ stars by the publication, The Foreign Post. It won the Awit Awards’ “Best Album Packaging”. “Simpleng Babae”, the novelty honky tonk song Bonnevie wrote instantly became a hit and earned her “Best Female Solo Rock Performance” by KATHA Awards.

Her production outfit has been known to specialize in “concept, socio-themed and original” projects. She began producing and performing in annual “Pinoy Summer Festivals” around the Philippines: Boracay, Puerto Galera, Tagaytay, Dumaguete, Bicol and parts of Mindanao.

In 1997, Bonnevie produced her husband Toto Gentica’s multilingual opera on the first Filipino Hero, “Lapu Lapu” at the Cultural Center of the Philippines ’Main Theater.

In 1999, “TISAY” was released by ALPHA Records. It included 10 cuts of all original –compositions in Tagalog. The album featured Bonnevie’s innate talent as a songwriter and lyricist. The music spawned diversified influences including ethnic and world leanings that borders from pop-to rock-to folk in the contemporary setting. The song “Salamat”, a poetic love song was released with an acoustic-ballad version and a groove version.”Tuloy and Ikot”, a song from the album garnered a Best World Music category in KATHA Awards.

In 2000, Bonnevie produced and starred in her first environmental production, Earthborne. This music festival paved way to Earthday Jam (annual music street celebration for the worldwide Earth Day) that continues to rock the Philippines in its 13 years of musical marathon for Mother Earth.

In 2006, Bonnevie appeared, endorsed and produced a DENR-sponsored 60-seconder Television Commercial “Let’s Care For Our Ozone Layer” and “Let’s Care for our Air” that also featured the Australian Youth Volunteers for the environment, Christian Bautista and Heart Evangelista. Her commercial focused on “car pooling”. She sang its complementing jingles and original songs. In 2007, Bonnevie sang an environmental song for the Philippine DENR dubbed “Ang Hangin Ng Mundo”. With her environmental works accelerating and being recognized, she was awarded the Fr. Neri Satur Award for Environmental Heroism as ECO-ARTIST given by UNESCO, National Commission on Culture and the Arts (NCCA) and Department of Education (DEPED) with Bishop Francisco Claver, S.J., journalists Jerry Esplanada And Katherine Adraneda as the other recipients.

In 2009, she performed in the Philippines “World March For Peace and Non-Violence” and hosted the USAID Energy & Clean Air project. In 2010, after more than 10 years, Bonnevie produced “Only Human” distributed by Viva Records. The album featured ALL original compositions in pop, rock, reggae, acoustic, blues, with all her roots and influences in tucked. In this album, Bonnevie displayed her musicianship as she dabbles with most guitar tracks. First single is LAFS (Love At First Sight) with an accompanying music video. “In her latest album “Only Human”, Bonnevie understands her music that she is able to enumerate the intangibles she is touching through her medium of expression. The album’s songs conjure that toughness and sexiness that thrill the ears more than anything else.”, as expressed by the PRESS (Manila Bulletin and Philippine Star) during its 2010 launch. It includes three socio-conscious compositions: ”I Am Hurting”(Mother Earth’s Plea),”People Don’t Care”, “Say No!”.

In 2011, Bonnevie performed in the 1980s-themed theatrical concert 80289, which was staged at the Music Museum in Manila and featured multiple performers. The show also included performers Gino Padilla, Jamie Rivera, Juan Miguel Salvador, Chad Borja and Ella May Saison.

In the year 2012, Bonnevie was awarded and named “The Philippines Clean Air Champion ” from Partnership for Clean Air, Department of Environment and Natural Resources, Department of Transportation and Communications(DOTC) and Metro Manila Development Authority (MMDA) in recognition of her environmental advocacy and as an ambassadress of the cause. Thereafter she released a music video entitled “Halina, Sama, Sama Tayo” produced by the Environmental Management Bureau of DENR to push the campaign on “Clean Air”. The music video is on YouTube rotation. In November, she headlines the “Clean Air Pwede?” concert in celebration of the Clean Air Month.

In 2013 Bonnevie, together with her family and supporters founded Earthday Jam Foundation, an offshoot from the successful annual “Earthday jam”. Their initial project is “Tara, Tara sa Corregidor Coastal clean Up”, a unique mix of advocacy-history and music in one.

“Tara tara sa Corregidor Part 2 “(In Celebration of the September Coastal Clean Up Month); “ The Earthday Jam National Tour” are in the offing for 2013, with Bonnevie spearheading the Philippines foremost performers.

== Discography ==
=== Albums ===
In a span of 25 years, Bonnevie has recorded 6 studio albums and 1 live album, including 3 international albums.

- 1984: Lou Bonnevie
- 1987: My World
- 1992: Your Love
- 199?: Live on Campus
- 1994: She Knows How to Rock
- 2000: Tisay
- 2009: Only Human

=== Studio releases ===
Albums and its singles.

- Lou Bonnevie (self-titled debut) (WEA Records)
  - "I'm Every Girl"
  - "Rockin’ the Beat"
  - "What a Fool I Am" - theme song of the film Teen Age Marriage (Regal Films, 1984)
  - "I Need Your Love"
- My World (WEA Records)
  - "Love Me Tonight"
  - "Lagi Lagi Na Lang"
- Your Love (Sonata Records)
  - "Sa 'Yo Lamang"
  - "Sleepless Nights" (Awit Awards nomination for Best Rock Category)
  - "Forever’s Here Too Soon"
- She Knows How to Rock (won Awit Award for Best Album Packaging) (Musiko/BMG Records)
  - "Searchin’"
  - "Simpleng Babae" (won KATHA Award for Best Female Solo Rock Performance)
  - "Get Electrical" (theme song of the TV commercial of international brand Colgate)
- Tisay (Alpha Records)
  - "Salamat"
  - "Ano ang Nangyayari"
- Only Human (Viva Records)
  - "LAFS (Love at First Sight)"

=== Live releases ===
- 1994: Lou Bonnevie: On Campus Live

=== Music videos ===
- 1999: "Salamat"
- 2009: "LAFS (Love at First Sight)"
- 2012: "Halina, Sama Sama Tayo"

=== International releases ===
Albums and songs by Bonnevie contained in album.

- 1990: Gallforce 2 (Polydor)
  - "Excuse Me"
  - "I Need Your Love"
- 1992–93: A.D. Police (anime soundtrack) (Bandai Records)
  - "Your Love Album"
- A.D. Police: Phantom Lady (guest vocals) (Bandai Records)
- Bubblegum Crisis (anime soundtrack)

=== Songs featured in commercials ===
- 1994: "Get Electrical"
- "Mintirinse" - Colgate

=== Videoke releases ===
- 1994–95: (Bell International)
  - Love Me Tonight
  - Lagi Lagi Na Lang
  - I Need Your Love
