= Enveloped Ideas (song) =

Single by The Dawn

from the album The Dawn
- B-side: "Enveloped Ideas (Minus One Version)"
- Released: 1987
- Recorded: 1986
- Genre: New wave
- Length: 4:03
- Label: OctoArts International, Inc.
- Songwriter(s): Teddy Diaz, C. Fineza
- Producer(s): Jose Mari Gonzales

The Dawn singles chronology
"Enveloped Ideas" (1987)	"Salamat" (1989)

"Enveloped Ideas" is the debut single by Filipino rock/new wave band the Dawn, from their 1987 eponymous debut album. The song was written by guitarist Teddy Diaz and C. Fineza, and produced by Jose Mari Gonzales. It was engineered by Oscar Mallari, and mixed by Joseph Roxas and Bob Guzman.

== Background ==
"Enveloped Ideas" is the band's signature song. The lyrics in the first verse are: "Trying pointlessly to understand, having nothing to say, just shadows, what remained boxed inside, this is what I call my enveloped ideas".

The independently released single was initially played as a demo at the Manila-based radio station DWXB. Listener reaction to the single was so positive that the Dawn became a byword in Pinoy rock music. The song has been certified gold by OctoArts International.

This song won over a large and loyal following for the band in 1986 when the demo version was played on the seminal radio station DWXB 102.7, and on the strength of that, they managed to get a recording contract with OctoArts International. It seemed like they did not have to suffer too much through the requisite period as starving artists as the band's manager Martin Galan recalls: "There was that year", but all things considered, a year seems inconsequential, given that the band went from small venues and house parties to playing the Metropolitan Theater in about that amount of time.

David Gonzales of AllMusic described this song as "enigmatic". The song started with Pablo Molina singing a slow melodic line in an operatic manner, accompanied by funereal organ chords. Peppy, spirited keyboard lines jump in, and the song is kickstarted to a lively, highly melodic tune, with a synthesizer riff. The song also features a guitar solo by Teddy Diaz.

== Personnel ==
=== Musicians ===
- Teddy Diaz – guitar
- JB Leonor – drums
- Jett Pangan – vocals, keyboards
- Carlos Balcells – Bass guitar

=== Technical ===
- Oscar Mallari – engineer (mixing)
- Bob Guzman – engineer (remix)
