= Carlos Balcells =

- Also known as: Caloy
- Born: Carlos Claparols Balcells; Talisay, Negros Occidental, Philippines
- Origin: Manila, Philippines
- Genres: Alternative rock
- Occupations: Industrial Engineer; Musician; Businessman; Politician
- Instruments: Bass and Acoustic guitar
- Years active: 1985–1995, 1997–2003, 2016–2017
- Formerly of: The Dawn; Cicada; Cappuccino; State of the Art; Stabb; Azul
- Website: www.thedawn.ph

Carlos "Caloy" Claparols Balcells is a Spanish Filipino bass guitar player, businessman and former politician, most notable for his work as the bass guitarist of Filipino rock band The Dawn.

== Early life ==
Balcells grew up listening to 70s rock and classical music. As a child, he had an appreciation for low bass frequencies, which set him up to become a bass guitar player.

== Career ==
=== Music ===
Balcells got his start playing in the band Cicada alongside Willie Revillame. They had the opportunity to back up Randy Santiago.

Balcells joined The Dawn in 1985 after bassist Clay Luna left for the United States. He has performed in live rock concerts and he has been a part of seven studio albums, one live album and 2 compilation albums released by the band within the 18 years that he was the bassist. The album releases include hit songs like "Enveloped Ideas", "Salamat", and "Iisang Bangka Tayo". However, in 2003, he had to quit the band since he had to go back to his province in Negros Occidental to work in their family business. He was replaced by Mon Legaspi, bass player for Wolfgang.

On June 7, 2016, Balcells along with Francis Reyes rejoined after Buddy Zabala who left the band on the same day. Thus, making a quintet again for the first time since 2004. His return was short-lived as he was unavailable in later dates for June and July 2016. He was briefly replaced by former bassist Mon Legaspi, who would later begin touring with them months later and would eventually be the band's regular bassist due to the dissolution of Wolfgang and Balcells being mostly pre-occupied with their family businesses. He would eventually return for some anniversary shows in 2017.

=== Politics ===
Balcells had a short stint as a town councilor of Talisay.

== Personal life ==
Balcells is a descendant of Aniceto Lacson. In 2005, he married cancer specialist Diana Cua. She is one of the founders of Pink for Life, an organization that assists breast cancer survivors in procuring treatments.

== Discography ==
The Dawn

- The Dawn (1986)
- I Stand With You (1988)
- Beyond the Bend (1989)
- Heart's Thunder (1990)
- Abot Kamay (1992)
- Puno't Dulo (1994)
- Prodigal Sun (2000)
