= AfterImage =

Filipino rock band

- Origin: Manila, Philippines
- Genres: Alternative rock; OPM; Pinoy rock; pop rock; soft rock
- Years active: 1987–1997; 2008–present
- Label: Dyna Records/Buhay Banda Pilipinas
- Members: Wency Cornejo; Bobit Uson; Chuck Isidro; Rogie Callejo; Arnold Cabalza
- Past members: Francis Reyes; Niño Mesina

AfterImage (sometimes spelled as After Image) is a Filipino rock band formed in 1987, best known for their songs "Habang May Buhay", "Next in Line", and "Mangarap Ka". They disbanded in 1997 and became active again in 2008 after they reunited and released their fourth studio album. After disbanding in 1997, Wency Cornejo, the band's vocalist, pursued a solo career.

In January 1992, the band signed with Dyna Records, The band's first album, entitled Touch the Sun, was released in July 1992. Among the eight songs that the album contained, four were released as singles: "Next in Line", "Bai (Sa Langit ang Ating Tagpuan)", "Only You", and "Pagtawid". The title of the album, which was the concluding part of the lyric to "Next in Line", was said to have just been a spontaneous utterance of a phrase which Cornejo made during the recording session for the said song.

== History ==
The band was composed of five members: Bobit Uson on bass guitar, Chuck Isidro on lead guitar, Rogie Callejo on drums, Arnold Cabalza on keyboards and Wency Cornejo on vocals. Francis Reyes was the former guitarist of the band before Chuck Isidro took his role.

In 1994 at the height of the first band craze in the Philippine music scene, AfterImage released their second album titled Tag-Ulan, Tag-Araw. The album's name was taken from two singles from the album. "Tag-ulan", the album's carrier single, topped various charts in the Philippines and was awarded a Gold Record Award, and later the follow-up single "Mangarap Ka" also became a huge hit for the band. They also won the first NU Rock Award for Artist of the Year in the same year. At the 1995 Awit Awards the album Tag-Ulan, Tag-Araw was named Album of the Year. A few months after winning the awards, Niño Mesina became the band's newest bassist leading Bobit Uson to play guitar alongside Chuck Isidro.

In 1996, the band released their 3rd album "Bagong Araw".

In 1997, AfterImage disbanded due to management conflicts. After 11 years of disbandment, the band reunited in 2008 for their new album, Our Place Under the Sun. from Viva Records, 12 years since their last album in 1996 from Dyna Records.

== Members ==
=== Current members ===
- Wency Cornejo – lead vocals
- Chuck Isidro – lead and rhythm guitar
- Bobit Uson – bass guitar, rhythm guitar, and backing vocals
- Rogie Callejo – drums
- Arnold Cabalza – keyboards, backing vocals

=== Former members ===
- Francis Reyes – lead guitar
- Niño Mesina – bass guitar

== Discography ==
=== Studio albums ===
- Touch the Sun (1992)
- Tag-Ulan, Tag-Araw (1994)
- Bagong Araw (1996)
- Our Place Under the Sun (2008)

=== Compilation albums ===
- Lites (1995)
- Greatest Hits (1996)

=== Singles ===
- "Next in Line" (1992)
- "Bai" (1992)
- "Believe"
- "Brightest Day"
- "Castaway"
- "Defenseless"
- "Extro"
- "Finding it Hard to Breathe"
- "Forevermore" (1994)
- "Habang Ako Ay Narito" (While I am Here)
- "Habang May Buhay" (While There's Life)
- "Lakas" (Strength)
- "Mangarap Ka" (Dream)
- "More Than Life"
- "Musikero" (Musician)
- "Only You"
- "Our Place Under the Sun"
- "Pagkat Ika'y Narito" (Because You're Here)
- "Pagtawid" (Crossing)
- "Panahon" (Time)
- "Patalim" (Blade)
- "Standing By Your Side"
- "Tag-Araw" (Summer Season)
- "Tag-Ulan" (Rainy Season)
- "Without You"
- "You Made Me Believe"

== Post-AfterImage ==
AfterImage lead singer Wency Cornejo went a solo career after the disbandment of the pop rock band in 1997. Aside from being a singer, he was also a former TV host for the youth-oriented lifestyle documentary magazine program "Tipong Pinoy" starring with his co-host, the late Susan Calo-Medina. Cornejo still performing mostly in music bars & restaurants. Chuck Isidro went on to join the music group 6cyclemind.

== Awards ==
Year	Award giving body	Category	Nominated work	Results
1992	Catholic Mass Media Award	Best Rock Recording	"Bai"	Won
1992	DM 95.5 FM 1st Pinoy Music Awards	Bagong Himig Kakaibang Tinig Award	"Next in Line"	Won
1993	6th Awit Awards	Best Performance a New Duo or Group of Recording Artists	"Next in Line"	Won
1994	NU Rock Awards	Artist of the Year	—N/a	Won
1995	8th Awit Awards	Album of the Year	"Tag Araw, Tag Ulan"	Won
1995	NU Rock Awards	Keyboardist of the Year	(for Arnold Cabalza)	Won
1995	Katha Music Awards	Album of the Year	"Tag Araw, Tag Ulan"	Won
1995	Katha Music Awards	Best Rock Album	Tag Araw, Tag Ulan	Won
1995	Katha Music Awards	Best Rock Group Performance	—N/a	Won
1995	Katha Music Awards	Best Rock Song	"Habang May Buhay"	Won
1995	Katha Music Awards	Song of the Year	"Habang May Buhay"	Won
1996	NU Rock Awards	Keyboardist of the Year	(for Arnold Cabalza)	Won

Awards
Preceded by New award	NU Rock Awards; Artist of the Year; 1994	Succeeded by Eraserheads
