= JB Leonor =

- Also known as: Junboy Leonor
- Born: Domingo Leonor III; November 14, 1962 (age 63)
- Origin: Manila, Philippines
- Genre: Rock
- Occupations: Musician, songwriter
- Instruments: Drums, percussion, keyboards
- Years active: 1985–present
- Label: OctoArts International, Inc.
- Member of: The Dawn
- Spouse: Gina Ocampo (m. 2003)

Domingo Leonor III (born November 14, 1962), better known as JB Leonor or Junboy Leonor, is a Filipino drummer and songwriter, best known as the co-founder of the Filipino rock/new wave band The Dawn. Leonor formed the band along with guitarist Teddy Diaz in 1986. As a songwriter, he wrote "I Stand With You" and co-wrote "Give Me the Night" with Jett Pangan.

== Personal life ==
Leonor is married to Gina Ocampo in 2003. They have two children; Anika and Adriel Martin.

== Filmography ==
=== Film ===
Year	Title	Role	Notes	Ref.
1994	Mama's Boys 2 (Let's Go Na!)	Himself	(credited as Jun Boy Leonor)	
2006	Tulad ng Dati	Himself		

== Discography ==
=== Studio albums ===
The Dawn

- The Dawn (1986)
- I Stand With You (1988)
- Beyond the Bend (1989)
- Heart's Thunder (1990)
- Abot Kamay (1992)
- Puno't Dulo (1994)
- Prodigal Sun (2000)
- Harapin (2004)
- Tulad ng Dati (2006)
- The Later Half of Day (2008)
- Sound the Alarm (2009)
- Ascendant (2018)
