= Teddy Diaz =

Filipino musician (1963–1988)

- Teddy Diaz onstage in 1987

Background information
- Born: April 1, 1963; Manila, Philippines
- Died: August 21, 1988 (aged 25) Quezon City, Philippines
- Genres: Rock, new wave
- Occupations: Musician, songwriter
- Instruments: Guitar, vocals, keyboards
- Years active: 1985–1988
- Label: OctoArts International, Inc.
- Formerly of: The Dawn
- Website: www.thedawn.ph

Teodoro "Teddy" de Villa Diaz (1 April 1963 – 21 August 1988) was a Filipino musician and songwriter, best known as the founder and original guitarist of the Dawn.

As a songwriter, he co-wrote the band's first single "Enveloped Ideas" and the hit song "Salamat", which was released posthumously in 1989. He played guitar on the albums The Dawn (1986) and I Stand with You (1988). Aside from being a guitarist, he played keyboards as credited on the Dawn's 1986 debut album.

At the height of his career, and fame, and at the peak of the Dawn's popularity in the late 1980s, he was stabbed to death in front of his girlfriend's house by two bystanders who were allegedly under the influence of drugs and alcohol.

== Early life ==
Diaz's father is Filipino actor Vic Diaz of Sampaguita Pictures fame; his grandfather is Pompeyo Diaz, a judge. His godfather is Fernando Poe, Jr. who was the "King of Philippine Movies". Diaz was born on April Fools' Day, and was often teased because of this. He was the first grandchild on both sides of his family. Diaz had two brothers, Carl and Loren.

Diaz spent both grade school and high school in his father and grandfather's alma mater, Ateneo de Manila University. After graduating from high school, he enrolled at the University of the Philippines where he studied Architecture for three years. He transferred to the Philippine Women's University after his third year in UP and took up Music, with guitar as his major. Aside from being a musician, Diaz was also gifted with a talent in drawing. He would spend time with Fine Arts students in PWU, and would draw comic book characters and different electric guitar designs for relaxation.

== Career ==
The Dawn was formed in 1985 and originally consisted of Diaz on guitar, JB Leonor on drums and Clay Luna on bass. The band's name was derived from a portrait of the Holy Spirit that symbolized the dawn of a new day (probably found in a book given by the Sisters of the Holy Spirit to Teddy Diaz, as well as a crucifix which Teddy also received from the same sisterhood), called The Dawning of the Holy Spirit. Diaz, Leonor and Luna initially wanted a female vocalist but in the course of their search, Jett Pangan auditioned, got the trio's unanimous nod and the quartet started performing in clubs. In 1987, he co-wrote the Dawn's debut single "Enveloped Ideas", as Orly Ilacad of OctoArts gave them the necessary breakthrough by releasing their single and 12" EP of the single. The arrangement of the Filipino traditional folk song, "Magtanim ay 'Di Biro" was also credited to Diaz. Other songs which Diaz wrote or co-wrote were "Dreams" and "The Moon". The band Introvoys was mentored by Diaz.

Before his death, he became friends with Francis Reyes (who later joined the band as guitarist) where they even spoke of forming a thrash metal side project with drummer JB Leonor's brother, Dennis.

== Death ==
On 21 August 1988, the Dawn performed "Love (Will Set Us Free)" on Martin After Dark, a show hosted by Martin Nievera. After the performance, they left the GMA Network compound and went their separate ways. Diaz proceeded to his girlfriend's home in Agno Street, Tatalon, Quezon City. As he was approaching the gate to the dwelling, he was accosted by two drunken men. Diaz gave them his wallet containing Php 200.00, his share of the fee from the band's earlier performance. After taking the wallet, one of the men, who was armed with a knife, began stabbing Diaz. Wounds on Diaz's left arm indicated that he may have tried to parry the blows, but a knife thrust to his throat caused massive bleeding, eventually leading to his death. Drummer JB Leonor explained: "With his long hair, Teddy might have been mistaken for a woman, an easy prey. Teddy might have resisted at some point, and that's why they stabbed him. He was really a victim of circumstance. He just happened to be at the wrong place at the wrong time."

Diaz's murderer was apprehended by police a week later, tried in court, convicted and remanded to the custody of authorities at the New Bilibid Prison. Members of the Dawn stated that the convict had since died in incarceration.

The first decision of the three surviving members and band's manager Martin Galan was to continue with the band; they also agreed that Diaz's replacement would not have to be his clone. In September 1988, Francis Reyes was asked to be one of the three guitarists who were to play Diaz's parts in the tribute concert "Salamat Teddy" at the Folk Arts Theater. Reyes talked about Diaz and said: "People continue to remember Teddy. He had star quality written all over him that registered very well even with those who didn't know him as a musician. He had a very strong personality that you just can't ignore."

== Legacy ==
In spite of his early demise, his influence is still felt among many guitarists in the Philippines today and he has become a legend among many Filipino musicians. The Dawn, and the Filipino music industry also consider Diaz to be the band's driving force until today. In memory of Diaz, the Dawn recorded a song that paid tribute to him, "I Stand with You". Perfecto de Castro, former guitarist of Rivermaya, was inspired to study the guitar upon seeing Diaz perform with the Dawn at a concert in 1987. Former AfterImage guitarist and 6cyclemind's founding lead guitarist Chuck Isidro is also influenced by Diaz. In 2006, a photo emerged featuring Francis Reyes playing Diaz's last surviving Hofner guitar.

Former Eraserheads bassist Buddy Zabala described Diaz's death as a "great loss, and after a band made a success out of creating homegrown music, other local bands started writing their own material. But it was Teddy who was the prime mover of the Dawn". In 2006, he was portrayed by actor Ping Medina.

== Guitars, amps, and effects ==
The guitars most associated with Diaz are his red Casio MG-500, his Hofner Committee archtop, and his black Maya Les Paul, which he prominently used in the Ultrastorm concert with a bow in 1987.

Effects he used include the Boss Power Supply and Master Switch, Boss Corporation Distortion Boss DS-1, Boss Heavy Metal Boss HM-2, Boss Flanger BF2, and Boss Digital Delay DD2. He also used the Roland Corporation Cube Amplifier, and Roland Jazz Chorus Amplifier

== See also ==
- The Dawn
- Jett Pangan
- Pinoy rock
