= List of Philippine films of 2024 =

This is an incomplete list of Filipino full-length films, both mainstream and independently produced, released in theaters, cinemas, and streaming services in 2024. Some films are in production but do not have definite release dates.

== Box office ==
The highest-grossing Filipino films released in 2024, by domestic box office gross revenue, are as follows:

^{MMFF} – an entry for the Metro Manila Film Festival.

Highest-grossing films of 2024
Rank	Title	Distributor	Box office	Ref.
1	Hello, Love, Again	Star Cinema	₱1,600,000,000	
2	And the Breadwinner Is...^{MMFF}	Star Cinema	₱460,000,000	
3	Un/Happy for You	Star Cinema	₱450,000,000	
4	Green Bones^{MMFF}	Sony Pictures Releasing International	₱133,742,461	

== January–March ==
Opening		Title	Production company	Cast and crew	Ref.
J A N U A R Y	5	Bedspacer	Viva Films / Vivamax	Carlo Obispo (director); Christine Bermas, Micaella Raz	
J A N U A R Y	10	My Zombabe	Viva Films	Bobby Bonifacio (director); Kim Molina, Empoy Marquez	
J A N U A R Y	12	Karinyo Brutal	Viva Films / Vivamax / LargaVista Entertainment	Jose Javier Reyes (director); Apple Dy, Armani Hector, Benz Sangalang	
J A N U A R Y	16	Room Service	Vivamax	Bobby Bonifacio Jr. (director); Shiena Yu, Angelo Ilagan, Nathan Cajucom	
J A N U A R Y	17	Road Trip	Viva Films	Andoy Ranay (director); Janice de Belen, Gelli de Belen, Carmina Villarroel, Candy Pangilinan	
J A N U A R Y	19	Palipat-lipat, Papalit-palit	Vivamax / Pelikula Indiopendent	Roman Perez Jr. (director); Denise Esteban, Aiko Garcia, Victor Relosa, Chester Grecia	
J A N U A R Y	24	Itutumba Ka ng Tatay Ko	Viva Films	Janno Gibbs (director); Janno Gibbs, Xia Vigor	
J A N U A R Y	24	GG (Good Game)	MQuest Ventures / Mediaworks / Create Cinema	Prime Cruz (director); Donny Pangilinan, Maricel Laxa	
J A N U A R Y	26	Pantasya Ni Tami	Vivamax / Two Inches of Loneliness	Topel Lee, Easy Ferrer (director); Azi Acosta, Jiad Arroyo	
J A N U A R Y	28	You're Mine	Regal Entertainment	Easy Ferrer (director); Jane Oineza, Tony Labrusca, Anikka Camaya	
J A N U A R Y	31	My Sassy Girl	Viva Films / TinCan	Fifth Solomon (director); Toni Gonzaga, Pepe Herrera	
J A N U A R Y	31	Dilig	Vivamax	Christian Paolo Lat (director); Dyessa Garcia, Rica Gonzales, Chad Solano	
F E B R U A R Y	2	Salawahan	Vivamax / Great Media Productions	Jeffrey Hidalgo (director); Angeli Khang, Albie Casiño	
F E B R U A R Y	7	Ikaw Pa Rin Ang Pipiliin Ko	Viva Films	Denise O'Hara (director); Aga Muhlach, Julia Barretto	
F E B R U A R Y	9	Katas	Vivamax	Rodante Pajemna Jr. (director); Sahara Bernales, Chester Grecia	
F E B R U A R Y	12	Take Me to Banaue	Carpe Diem Pictures	Danny Aguilar (director); Brandon Melo, Maureen Wroblewitz	
F E B R U A R Y	13	Takas	Vivamax	Roman Perez Jr. (director); Audrey Avila, Cess Garcia, Mon Mendoza	
F E B R U A R Y	14	I Am Not Big Bird	Black Sheep Productions, Anima	Victor Villanueva (director); Enrique Gil, Pepe Herrera, Nikko Natividad, Red Ollero	
F E B R U A R Y	14	A Cup of Flavor	3:16 Media Network, Viva One	Ma-an Asuncion-Dagñalan (director); Barbie Imperial, JC Santos	
F E B R U A R Y	14	Slay Zone	WIDE Films International	Louie Ignacio (director); Pokwang, Glaiza de Castro	
F E B R U A R Y	16	Salitan	Vivamax / Diamond Productions / Pelikula Indiopendent	Bobby Bonifacio Jr. (director); Angelica Hart, Matt Francisco, Vern Kaye, Nico Locco	
F E B R U A R Y	23	Kabit	Vivamax / Pelikulaw	Law Fajardo (director); Angela Morena, Dyessa Garcia, Victor Relosa, Josef Elizalde	
F E B R U A R Y	27	Salisihan	Vivamax	Iar Arondaig (director); Zsara Laxamana, Amabella de Leon, Chester Grecia, Ralph Engle	
F E B R U A R Y	28	The Buy Bust Queen	Pinoyflix Films	JR Olinares (director); Phoebe Walker, Maxine Medina, Ritz Azul	
F E B R U A R Y	28	After All	ALV Films	Adolfo Alix Jr. (director); Beauty Gonzalez, Kelvin Miranda	
M A R C H	1	Eks	Vivamax / Blvck Vilms / Pelikula Indiopendent	Roman Perez, Jr. (director); Yen Durano, Albie Casiño, Felix Roco	
M A R C H	6	Apo Hapon	GK Productions	Joel Lamangan (director); JC de Vera, Sakura Akiyoshi	
M A R C H	6	A Glimpse of Forever	Viva Films, Ninuno Media	Jason Paul Laxamana (director); Jasmine Curtis-Smith, Diego Loyzaga, Jerome Ponce	
M A R C H	8	Kapalit	Vivamax	Carlo Alvarez (director); Cess Garcia, Rica Gonzales, Matt Francisco, Chad Alviar	
M A R C H	12	Kalikot	Vivamax	Temi Cruz Abad (director); Sheila Snow, Van Allen Ong, Arah Alonzo	
M A R C H	13	Layas	Pinoyflix Films	JR Olinares (director); Nadine Samonte, Michelle Vito, Alex Medina, Joem Bascon	
M A R C H	13	3 Days 2 Nights in Poblacion	Black Cap Pictures	RC delos Reyes (director); Jasmine Curtis-Smith, Barbie Imperial, JM de Guzman	
M A R C H	15	A Lab Story	Puregold	Carlo Obispo (director); Uzziel Delamide, Potchi Angeles	
M A R C H	15	Boys at the Back	Puregold	Raynier Brizuela (director); Noel Comia Jr., Nicole Omillo, Michael Berces	
M A R C H	15	One Day League: Dead Mother	Puregold	Eugene Torres (director); Lady Morgana, Negi, Macoy Dubs	
M A R C H	15	Pushcart Tales	Puregold	Sigrid Bernardo (director); Nonie Buencamino, Shamaine Buencamino, Carlos Siguion-Reyna, Harvey Bautista, Therese Malvar, Elora Españo	
M A R C H	15	Road to Happy	Puregold	Joel Ferrer (director); VJ Mendoza, Smokey Manaloto, Darlyn Salang	
M A R C H	15	Under a Piaya Moon	Puregold	Kurt Soberano (director); Jeff Moses, Pauline Dimaranan, Joel Torre, Chart Motus	
M A R C H	15	Mapanukso	Vivamax / LDG Productions	Jose Abdel Langit (director); Tiffany Grey, Ataska Mercado, Sean de Guzman, Marco Gomez, Rica Gonzales	
M A R C H	20	Pagpag 24/7	Viva Films, MAVX Productuons	JR Reyes (director); Jerald Napoles, Nikko Natividad, Nicco Manalo, Danita Paner	
M A R C H	22	Rita	Vivamax	Jerry Lopez Sineneng (director); Christine Bermas, Victor Relosa, Gold Aceron, Josh Ivan Morales	
M A R C H	26	Kasalo	Vivamax	HF Yambao (director); Vern Kaye, Albie Casiño	
M A R C H	30	Dearly Beloved	Viva Films	Marla Ancheta (director); Cristine Reyes, Baron Geisler	
M A R C H	30	TL	Vivamax	Jordan Castillo (director); Jenn Rosa, Armani Hector, Nico Locco	

Color key

- – a Puregold CinePanalo Film Festival entry film

== April–June ==
Opening		Title	Production company	Cast and crew	Ref.
A P R I L	2	Cheaters	Vivamax	Dustin Celestino (director); Angeline Aril, Aerol Carmelo, Kara Fernandez, Jhon Mark Marcia	
A P R I L	5	Stag	Vivamax / Pelipula Productions	Jon Red (director); Denise Esteban, Arah Alonzo, Gold Aceron, Aerol Carmelo	
A P R I L	10	Sunny	Viva Films / Studio Viva	Jalz Zarate (director); Vina Morales, Angelu de Leon, Sunshine Dizon, Tanya Garcia, Katya Santos, Ana Roces, Heaven Peralejo, Bea Binene, Marco Gallo, Xia Vigor	
A P R I L	12	Your Mother's Son	The IdeaFirst Company	Jun Lana (director); Sue Prado, Miggy Jimenez, Elora Españo, Kokoy de Santos	
A P R I L	12	A Journey	Netflix / MAVX Productuons / Filmotion Productions	RC Delos Reyes (director); Paolo Contis, Patrick Garcia, Kaye Abad	
A P R I L	12	Sweet Release	Vivamax	Pancho Maniquis (director); Ataska Mercado, Dyessa Garcia	
A P R I L	16	Wanted Girlfriend	Vivamax	Rember Gelera (director); Shiena Yu	
A P R I L	17	Under Parallel Skies	28 Squared Studios / Two Infinity Entertainment	Sigrid Bernardo (director); Janella Salvador, Metawin Opas-iamkajorn	
A P R I L	17	X & Y	G Channel Entertainment Productions	Adolfo Alix Jr. (director); Ina Raymundo, Will Ashley	
A P R I L	19	Dayo	Vivamax / 316 Media Network	Sid Pascua (director); Rica Gonzales, Audrey Avila, Marco Gomez, Calvin Reyes	
A P R I L	24	Elevator	Viva Films / Cineko Productions / Rein Entertainment	Philip King (director); Paulo Avelino, Kylie Verzosa	
A P R I L	24	G! L.U.	ALV Films / Rein Entertainment / Benchingko Films	Philip King (director); David Licauco, Kiko Estrada, Teejay Marquez, Derrick Monasterio, Enzo Pineda, Ruru Madrid	
A P R I L	26	Red Flag	Vivamax	Lakambini Morales (director); Micaella Raz, Joana David	
A P R I L	30	Late Bloomer	Vivamax	Rodante Pajenma Jr. (director); Robb Guinto, Erika Balagtas	
M A Y	1	Bantay-Bahay	Regal Entertainment	Jose Javier Reyes (director); Pepe Herrera	
M A Y	1	Men are from QC, Women are from Alabang	Viva Films, MQuest Ventures / Sari Sari / Epik Studios	Gino M. Santos (director); Marco Gallo, Heaven Peralejo	
M A Y	3	Lady Guard	Vivamax	Bobby Bonifacio Jr. (director); Angela Morena, Irish Tan	
M A Y	3	Pula	CCM Productions / Center Stage Productions (Note: It is distributed by Netflix but it is not a Netflix original.)	Brillante Mendoza (director); Reynold Giba (screenplay); Coco Martin, Julia Montes	
M A Y	8	The Blood Brothers	Innovative Digital Entertainment Arts	Roy Iglesias (director); Cesar Montano, Victor Neri, Alan Paule, Ronald Adamat	
M A Y	10	Dirty Ice Cream	Vivamax	Mervyn Brondial (director); Christy Imperial, Candy Veloso, Yda Manzano, Jem Milton	
M A Y	15	Fuchsia Libre	MAVX Productuons	Tonio Rodulfo (director); Paolo Contis, John Arcilla	
M A Y	15	Isang Gabi	Viva Films	Mac Alejandre (director); Diego Loyzaga, Coleen Garcia	
M A Y	17	Balinsasayaw	Vivamax / JPHlix Films / Flash Fast Production	Rodante Pajemna Jr. (director); Aiko Garcia, Apple Dy, Benz Sangalang	
M A Y	22	When Magic Hurts	REM Entertainment / IGMM Film Production / Axinite Digicinema Inc.	Gabby Ramos (director); Mutya Orquia, Beaver Magtalas, Maxine Trinidad, Claudine Barretto	
M A Y	24	Kulong	Vivamax	Sigrid Polon (director); Jenn Rosa, Aica Veloso	
M A Y	28	Serbidoras	Vivamax	Ray Gibraltar (director); Chloe Jenna, Denise Esteban	
M A Y	29	Seoulmeyt	Viva Films, VinCentiments / Film Line	Darryl Yap (director); Jerald Napoles, Kim Molina	
M A Y	29	Chances Are You And I	PM Productions	Catherine Camarillo (director); Kira Balinger, Kelvin Miranda	
M A Y	31	Himas	Vivamax	Christian Paolo Lat (director); Sahara Bernales, Zsara Laxamana	
J U N E	4	Mahal Ko Ang Mahal Mo	Vivamax	Aya Topacio (director); Angelica Hart, Angeline Aril	
J U N E	5	1521	Inspire Studios / Viva Films	Michael Barder (director); Mary Krell-Oishi (screenplay); Danny Trejo, Bea Alonzo, Costas Mandylor, Michael Copon, Hector David Jr., Maricel Laxa, Vic Romano, Floyd Tena, Larissa Buendia	
J U N E	7	Linya	Vivamax	Carlo Alvarez (director); Sheila Snow, Cess Garcia	
J U N E	12	Playtime	GMA Pictures / Viva Films	Mark Reyes (director): Sanya Lopez, Coleen Garcia, Faye Lorenzo, Xian Lim	
J U N E	12	Fruitcake	Cornerstone Studios	Joel Ferrer (director); Joshua Garcia, Heaven Peralejo, Jane Oineza, Empoy Marquez, Ria Atayde, KD Estrada, Enchong Dee, Alex Diaz, Victor Anastacio, Markus Paterson	
J U N E	14	Sisid Marino	Vivamax / LDG Productions	Joel Lamangan (director); Julia Victoria, Jhon Mark Marcia	
J U N E	18	Cita	Vivamax / Mckenzie Brad Entertainment Production	MJ Balagtas (director); Erika Balagtas, Zia Zamora	
J U N E	19	Karma	Viva Films / Happy Infinite Productions	Albert Langitan (director); Rhen Escaño, Sid Lucero	
J U N E	21	Nurse Abi	Vivamax	Dustin Celestino (director); Alessandra Cruz	
J U N E	26	A Thousand Forests	I Syoot Multimedia Productions	Hanz Florentino (director); Ramjean Entera, Venice Angela Bismonte, James Mavie Estrella, Dennah Bautista, Santino Juan Santiago	
J U N E	28	Huwad	Vivamax / ComGuild Productions / Flaming River Film Production	Reynold Giba (director); Azi Acosta	

== July–September ==
Opening		Title	Production company	Cast and crew	Ref.
J U L Y	2	Top 1	Vivamax	Temi Abad (director); Christy Mae Imperial, Mariane Saint, Armani Hector	
J U L Y	3	Kuman Thong	Viva Films / Studio Viva	Xian Lim (director); Max Nattapol Diloknawarit, Cindy Miranda, Althea Ruedas	
J U L Y	5	Maliko	Vivamax / Flash Fast Production	JR Frias (director); Sahara Bernales, Eunice Santos, Chad Solano	
J U L Y	10	That Kind of Love	Regal Entertainment / PM Productions	Catherine Camarillo (director); Barbie Forteza, David Licauco	
J U L Y	12	Hiraya	Vivamax / 316 Media Network	Sid Pascua (director); Rica Gonzales, Itan Rosales, Denise Esteban	
J U L Y	16	Kaulayaw	Vivamax	Iar Arondaing (director); Robb Guinto, Micaella Raz	
J U L Y	19	Maharot	Vivamax / Flash Fast Production	Rodante Pajemna Jr. (director); Aiko Garcia, Victor Relosa, Athena Red	
J U L Y	19	Moro	Centerstage Productions	Brillante Mendoza (director); Piolo Pascual, Christopher de Leon, Baron Geisler	
J U L Y	24	Sagrada Luna (The Virgin Sisters)	Pinoyflix, Legalas Entertainment	JR Olinares (director); Jeffrey Santos, Alexa Ocampo, Rash Flores	
J U L Y	26	Kaskasero	Vivamax / 316 Media Network	Ludwig Peralta (director); Angela Morena, Christine Bermas, Itan Rosales	
J U L Y	30	Init	Vivamax	Piem Acero (director); Dyessa Garcia, Candy Veloso, Rash Flores	
J U L Y	31	How to Slay a Nepo Baby	Viva Films / Happy Infinite Productions	Rod Marmol (director); Sue Ramirez, Barbie Imperial	
A U G U S T	2	Alipato at Muog	Cinemalaya Foundation	JL Burgos (director);	
A U G U S T	2	Tumandok	Cinemalaya Foundation	Kat Sumagaysay, Richard Salvadicio (directors); Jenaica Sangher, Felipe Ganancial	
A U G U S T	2	Balota	Cinemalaya Foundation	Kip Oebanda (director); Marian Rivera, Will Ashley, Royce Cabrera	
A U G U S T	2	Gulay Lang Manong	Cinemalaya Foundation	BC Amparado (director); Cedrick Juan, Perry Dizon	
A U G U S T	2	Kantil (Trench)	Cinemalaya Foundation	Joshua Caesar Medroso (director); Edmund Telmo, Andre Miguel, Sue Prado	
A U G U S T	2	Kono Basho (This Place)	Cinemalaya Foundation	Jaime Pacena II (director); Gabby Padilla, Arisa Nakano	
A U G U S T	2	Love Child	Cinemalaya Foundation	Jonathan Jurilla (director); RK Bagatsing, Jane Oineza	
A U G U S T	2	The Errand	Cinemalaya Foundation	Sarge Lacuesta (director); Sid Lucero, Art Acuña, Elora Españo	
A U G U S T	2	The Hearing	Cinemalaya Foundation	Lawrence Fajardo (director); Mylene Dizon, Nor Domingo, Ina Feleo	
A U G U S T	2	The Wedding Dance	Cinemalaya Foundation	Julius Lumiqued (director); Mai Fanglayan, Arvin Balageo	
A U G U S T	2	Daddysitter	Vivamax	Christian Paolo Lat (director); Apple Dy, Emil Sandoval, Armani Hector, Mia Cruz	
A U G U S T	5	Crazy In Love With You	Romina Film Production	EJ Salcedo (director); Claire Ruiz, Miko Raval	
A U G U S T	7	Unang Tikim	Vivamax / Pelikula Indiopendent	Roman Perez Jr. (director); Angeli Khang, Robb Guinto	
A U G U S T	7	When the World Met Miss Probinsyana	Impact Media Convergence Inc.	JP Ninlaga (director); Rhian Ramos, Sid Lucero	
A U G U S T	7	Lolo and the Kid	Netflix / Lonewolf Films	Benedict Mique (director); Joel Torre, Euwenn Mikaell	
A U G U S T	9	Package Deal	Vivamax	Carby Salvador (director); Angelica Hart, Mariane Saint	
A U G U S T	13	Backrider	Vivamax	Bobby Bonifacio Jr. (director); Jenn Rosa, Aeron Carmelo, Chad Alviar	
A U G U S T	14	Un/Happy for You	Star Cinema / ABS-CBN Studios / Viva Films	Petersen Vargas (director); Joshua Garcia, Julia Barretto	
A U G U S T	16	Ang Pintor at ang Paraluman	Vivamax	Marc Misa (director); Athena Red, Skye Gonzaga	
A U G U S T	21	Whispers in the Wind	Mavx Productions Inc./ Black Cap Pictures	RC Delos Reyes (director); Carlo Aquino, Barbie Imperial	
A U G U S T	21	And So It Begins	Solar Pictures	Ramona Diaz (director); Maria Ressa, Leni Robredo	
A U G U S T	23	Ang Kapitbahay	Vivamax	Rodante Pajemna Jr. (director); Christine Bermas, Clifford Pusing, Chester Grecia	
A U G U S T	27	Private Tutor	Vivamax / Blink Creative Studio / Nice One Productions	Ryan Evangelista (director); Zsara Laxamana, Christy Imperial, Mark Dionisio, VJ Vera	
A U G U S T	28	Pagtatag! The Documentary	First Light Studios / 1Z Entertainment	Jed Regala (director); Josh Cullen Santos, John Paulo Nase, Stell Ajero, Felip Suson, Justin de Dios	
A U G U S T	28	Real Life Fiction	Black Cap Pictures / Viva Films / TEN17P / Spring Films	Paul Soriano (director); Piolo Pascual, Jasmine Curtis-Smith	
A U G U S T	30	Butas	Vivamax	Dado Lumibao (director); Angela Morena, Angelica Hart, Albie Casiño	
S E P T E M B E R	3	F Buddies	Vivamax / 3:16 Media Network	Sid Pascua (director); Denise Esteban, Candy Veloso	
S E P T E M B E R	4	Banjo	Blasmel Pictures / Bordwerkz Productions	Bryan Wong (director); Bryan Wong, Danilo Cutamora Jr.	
S E P T E M B E R	4	Her Locket	Rebecca Chuaunsu Film Production / Revelde Films	J.E. Tiglao (director); Rebecca Chuaunsu, Elora Españo, Boo Gabunada, Benedict Cua	
S E P T E M B E R	4	Maple Leaf Dreams	Quantum Films / Star Magic / 7K Entertainment / Lonewolf Films	Benedict Mique (director); Kira Balinger, LA Santos	
S E P T E M B E R	4	Salome	Reckless Natarajan Pictures	Teng Mangansakan (director); Perry Dizon, Dolly de Leon, Tommy Alejandrino	
S E P T E M B E R	4	Talahib	Feast Foundation	Alvin Yapan (director); Gillian Vicencio, Kristof Garcia, Joem Bascon	
S E P T E M B E R	4	The Gospel of the Beast	Southern Lantern Studios	Sheron Dayoc (director); Jansen Magpusao, Ronnie Lazaro	
S E P T E M B E R	4	What You Did	The Jumpcat Experiment	Joan Loez-Flores (director); Tony Labrusca	
S E P T E M B E R	4	40	Viva Films / Happy Infinite	Dado Lumbao (director); Cindy Miranda, Kiko Estrada	
S E P T E M B E R	6	Throuple	Vivamax / Pelikula Indiopendent	Aya Topacio (director); Audrey Avila, Sahara Bernales, Aerol Carmelo	
S E P T E M B E R	13	Uhaw	Viva Films / Vivamax / White Space Digital Studios	Bobby Bonifacio Jr. (director); Angeli Khang, Ataska Mercado, Itan Rosales	
S E P T E M B E R	17	Paluwagan	Vivamax / Pelikula Indiopendent	Roman Perez Jr. (director); Micaella Raz, Victor Relosa, Shiena Yu, Chad Solano	
S E P T E M B E R	20	Pilya	Vivamax / PCB Film Production	Dustin Celestino (director); Cess Garcia, Dyessa Garcia	
S E P T E M B E R	27	Kiskisan	Vivamax / LDG Productions	Bobby Bonifacio Jr. (director); Robb Guinto, Apple Dy	

Color key

- – a Cinemalaya Philippine Independent Film Festival entry film
- – a Sinag Maynila entry film

== October–December ==
Opening		Title	Production company	Cast and crew	Ref.
O C T O B E R	1	Salsa Ni L	Vivamax	Rodante Pajemna Jr. (director); Christine Bermas, Sean de Guzman	
O C T O B E R	4	Tahong	Vivamax / Diamond Productions	Christopher Novabos (director); Candy Veloso, Salome Salvi, Jhon Mark Marcia, Emil Sandoval	
O C T O B E R	9	Mujigae	Happy Infinite / Unitel Straight Shooters	Randolph Longjas (director); Mark Raywin Tome (screenplay); Alexa Ilacad, Ji Soo, Ryrie Turingan	
O C T O B E R	11	Tatsulok: Tatlo Magkasalo	Vivamax / LDG Productions	Johnny Nadela (director); Mariane Saint, Skye Gonzaga, Jhon Mark Marcia	
O C T O B E R	15	Undergrads	Vivamax / The Big Shot Productions	Sigrid Polon (director); Rica Gonzales, Athena Red	
O C T O B E R	16	Crosspoint	High Road Creatives / 034 Productions	Donie Ordiales (director); Adam Luff, Tommy Shoes, Morrison (screenplay); Carlo Aquino, Takehiro Hira	
O C T O B E R	16	Guilty Pleasure	Regal Entertainment / C'est Lovi Productions	Connie Macatuno (director); Lovi Poe, JM de Guzman, Jameson Blake	
O C T O B E R	17	Outside	Netflix / Black Cap Pictures	Carlo Ledesma (director/screenplay); Sid Lucero, Beauty Gonzalez, Marco Masa, Aiden Patdu	
O C T O B E R	18	Halinghing	VMX / 3 Clubs Entertainment	Jaque Carlos (director); Aiko Garcia, Jenn Rosa, Josef Elizalde	
O C T O B E R	19	The Gatekeeper	iWantTFC / Kinetek	Dean Rosen, Matthew Rosen (directors); Dean Rosen, Zoe Alcarazen (screenplay); Shanaia Gomez	
O C T O B E R	23	Friendly Fire	Black Cap Pictures	Mikhail Red (director); Loisa Andalio, Coleen Garcia	
O C T O B E R	25	Krista	VMX / 316 Media Network	Sid Pascua (director); Cess Garcia, Karl Aquino, Zsara Laxamana	
O C T O B E R	29	Donselya	VMX / White Space Digital Studios	Christopher Novabos (director); Dyessa Garcia, Vern Kaye, Chloe Jenna	
O C T O B E R	30	Pasahero	Viva Films / Pelikula Indiopendent / Blvck Entertainment	Roman Perez, Jr. (director); Louise delos Reyes, Bea Binene, Katya Santos, Mark Anthony Fernandez	
O C T O B E R	30	Nanay, Tatay	Happy Infinite / Viva Films / Studio Viva	Roni Benaid (director); Jeffrey Hidalgo, Andrea del Rosario, Elia Ilano, Xia Vigor, Aubrey Caraan, Heart Ryan	
O C T O B E R	31	Nokturno	Viva Films / Amazon Prime Video / Evolve Studios / Studio Viva	Mikhail Red (director); Rae Red, Nikolas Red (screenplay); Nadine Lustre	
N O V E M B E R	1	Baligtaran	VMX / 316 Media Network	Aya Topacio (director); Skye Gonzaga, Apple Dy, Calvin Reyes	
N O V E M B E R	6	Abner	Agape Entertainment Productions	Neal Tan (director); Enzo Pineda, Rosanna Roces	
N O V E M B E R	8	Ungol	VMX / White Space Digital Studios	Bobby Bonifacio Jr. (director); Audrey Avila, Stephanie Raz, Chad Solano, Ghion Espinosa	
N O V E M B E R	9	Moneyslapper	Paraláya Studio / Dumpsite Gallery / Plan B	Bor Ocampo (director); John Lloyd Cruz, Jasmine Curtis-Smith	
N O V E M B E R	10	Phantosmia	TEN17P / Sine Olivia Pilipinas	Lav Diaz (director); Ronnie Lazaro, Janine Gutierrez	
N O V E M B E R	12	Kabitan	VMX / The Big Shot Productions	Sigrid Polon (director); Alessandra Cruz, Athena Red, Chester Grecia, Juan Paulo Calma	
N O V E M B E R	13	Hello, Love, Again	Star Cinema / ABS-CBN Studios / GMA Pictures	Cathy Garcia-Sampana (director); Carmi G. Raymundo, Crystal Hazel San Miguel (screenplay); Kathryn Bernardo, Alden Richards	
N O V E M B E R	15	Maryang Palad	VMX / Diamond Productions	Rodante Pajemna Jr. (director); Sahara Bernales, Vince Rillon	
N O V E M B E R	15	Girl Online	Regal Entertainment	Jose Javier Reyes (director); Adrienne Vergara, Teejay Marquez, Kat Galang, Fino Herrera	
N O V E M B E R	22	Pukpok	VMX / Diamond Productions	Christopher Novabos (director); Allison Smith, Arah Alonzo, Rash Flores	
N O V E M B E R	26	Boss Ma'am	VMX / FBN Media	Iar Arondaing (director); Jenn Rosa, Vern Kaye, Aeron Carmelo	
N O V E M B E R	27	Huwag Mo 'Kong Iwan	BenTria Productions	Joel Lamangan (director); Rhian Ramos, JC de Vera, Tom Rodriguez	
N O V E M B E R	27	IDOL: The April Boy Regino Story	Premiere WaterPlus Productions	Efren Reyes Jr. (director); John Arcenas, Kate Yalung, Rey PJ Abellana, Tanya Gomez, Dindo Arroyo, Irene Celebre	
D E C E M B E R	3	Silip	VMX / 3:16 Media Network	Bobby Bonifacio Jr. (director); Rica Gonzales, Lea Bernabe, Karl Aquino	
D E C E M B E R	4	Celestina: Burlesk Dancer	VMX	Mac Alejandre (director); Yen Durano, Christine Bermas, Sid Lucero, Arron Villaflor	
D E C E M B E R	6	Pin/Ya	VMX / Pelikula Indiopendent	Omar Deroca (director); Angelica Hart, Candy Veloso, Julianne Richards	
D E C E M B E R	12	The Last 12 Days	Blade Entertainment, Witty Jack Media	CJ Santos (director); Mary Joy Apostol, Akihiro Blanco	
D E C E M B E R	13	Forbidden Desire	VMX / Five 2 Seven Entertainment Production	GB Sampedro (director); Aiko Garcia, Vern Kaye, Josef Elizalde	
D E C E M B E R	17	Lamas	VMX / Diamond Productions	Christian Paolo Lat (director); Ataska Mercado, Christy Imperial, Mark Anthony Fernandez	
D E C E M B E R	20	Secret Sessions	VMX / Hugging Otters	Joel Ferrer (director); Athena Red, Nico Locco, Alona Navarro, JC Tan	
D E C E M B E R	25	And the Breadwinner Is...	Star Cinema / ABS-CBN Studios / The IdeaFirst Company	Jun Lana (director); Vice Ganda, Eugene Domingo	
D E C E M B E R	25	Espantaho	Quantum Films / Cineko Productions / Purple Bunny Productions	Chito S. Roño (director); Judy Ann Santos, Lorna Tolentino, Mon Confiado	
D E C E M B E R	25	Green Bones	Columbia Pictures / GMA Pictures / GMA Public Affairs / Brightburn Entertainment	Zig Dulay (director); Dennis Trillo, Ruru Madrid	
D E C E M B E R	25	Isang Himala	Kapitol Films / Unitel Pictures	Pepe Diokno (director); Aicelle Santos, Bituin Escalante	
D E C E M B E R	25	Hold Me Close	Viva Films / Ninuno Media	Jason Paul Laxamana (director); Carlo Aquino, Julia Barretto	
D E C E M B E R	25	My Future You	Regal Entertainment	Crisanto Aquino (director); Francine Diaz, Seth Fedelin	
D E C E M B E R	25	Strange Frequencies: Taiwan Killer Hospital	Reality MM Studios / Creative Leaders Group 8	Kerwin Go (director); Enrique Gil, Jane de Leon	
D E C E M B E R	25	The Kingdom	APT Entertainment / MZet Productions / MQuest Ventures	Michael Tuvera (director); Vic Sotto, Piolo Pascual	
D E C E M B E R	25	Topakk (Note: It premiered on an international film festival in 2023, but it is theatrically released in 2024.)	Nathan Studios / Strawdog Studios / FUSEE	Richard Somes (director); Arjo Atayde, Julia Montes, Sid Lucero, Enchong Dee, Kokoy de Santos	
D E C E M B E R	25	Uninvited	Warner Bros. Pictures / Mentorque Productions / Project 8 Projects	Dan Villegas (director); Vilma Santos, Nadine Lustre, Aga Muhlach	
D E C E M B E R	27	Boy Kaldag	VMX / Blvck Films / Pelikula Indiopendent	Roman Perez Jr. (director); Benz Sangalang, Dyessa Garcia, Angeli Khang, Ayanna Misola, Aiko Garcia	
D E C E M B E R	31	Mama's Boy	VMX	Paul Michael Asero (director); Sahara Bernales, Stephanie Raz, Victor Relosa, Josh Ivan Morales	

Color key

- – a Sine Sindak entry film
- – a QCinema International Film Festival entry film
- – a Metro Manila Film Festival entry film
