= Idol: The April Boy Regino Story =

2024 biography film directed by Efren Reyes Jr.

- Theatrical release poster
- Directed by: Efren Reyes Jr.
- Written by: Efren Reyes Jr.
- Starring: John Arcenas; Kate Yalung; Rey Abellana; Tanya Gomez; Dindo Arroyo; Irene Celebre
- Cinematography: Gilbert Obispo
- Edited by: Gilbert Obispo
- Music by: Boy Christopher Ramos
- Production company: WaterPlus Productions
- Release date: November 27, 2024
- Running time: 138 minutes
- Country: Philippines
- Language: Filipino

Idol: The April Boy Regino Story (stylized as IDOL) is a 2024 Philippine biographical drama film about pop singer April Boy Regino. Written and directed by Efren Reyes Jr., it stars John Arcenas, Kate Yalung, Rey PJ Abellana, Tanya Gomez and Dindo Arroyo with special participation of JC Regino. The film is nominated in 2025 FAMAS Awards for Best Song.

== Plot ==
The film opens in the impoverished neighborhoods of Marikina, where young Dennis Magloyuan Regino dreams of a better life for his family. Selling goods and participating in local singing contests, Dennis showcases his vocal talent and determination. His aspirations are fueled by his love for Madelyn, a steadfast partner who supports him through every challenge.

Facing limited opportunities in the Philippines, Dennis takes a leap of faith and moves to Japan to work as an entertainer. The separation tests his relationship with Madelyn, but their bond remains unbreakable. In Japan, Dennis hones his craft, gaining valuable experience and exposure.

Returning to the Philippines, Dennis collaborates with his brothers, Vingo and Jimmy, forming the musical group "April Boys." Their debut single, "Sana'y Laging Magkapiling," becomes an instant hit, propelling them to stardom. However, internal conflicts and personal struggles lead to the group's disbandment in 1995.

Embracing a solo career, Dennis adopts the stage name "April Boy Regino." His debut album, "Umiiyak Ang Puso," achieves triple platinum status, solidifying his place in the OPM scene. Hits like "Di Ko Kayang Tanggapin" and "Honey My Love So Sweet" resonate with fans, highlighting his emotive singing style.

Despite professional success, April Boy faces numerous personal hardships. The death of his father during the Christmas season deeply affects him. He battles chronic kidney disease, heart problems, and eventually loses his eyesight due to complications from diabetes. These health issues strain his emotional well-being, leading to moments of irritability and despair.

Throughout his trials, Madelyn decides to stay and take care of him. Her support helps April Boy navigate the darkest periods of his life.

Even as his health deteriorates, April Boy continues to perform, driven by his passion for music and his fans. His resilience and commitment leave a lasting impact on the Filipino music industry. The film concludes with a tribute to his legacy, celebrating his contributions to OPM and the inspiration he provided to many.

== Cast ==
- John Arcenas as April Boy Regino
- Kate Yalung
- Rey PJ Abellana
- Tanya Gomez
- Dindo Arroyo
- JC Regino
- Juadencio Yago
- Irene Celebre

== Production ==
Efren Reyes Jr., a veteran actor, wrote and directed the film. Marynette Gamboa is the executive producer, Lynn Madrigal is the supervising producer, and Gilbert Obispo handled cinematography and editing.

In July 18, 2024, the cast and crew are started filming and some of the scenes are shot in the spa and restaurant around Quezon City.

Efren Reyes Jr. the one who talks with April Boy Regino about his life when he was still alive. Reyes Jr. also said that he wants to start the production early but the COVID-19 pandemic came and April Boy Regino died on November 29, 2020. He added that he talks with Regino's wife to complete the story because he wants to show the true story of April Boy Regino beyond the stage.

== Release ==
Idol was released on November 27, 2024, under WaterPlus Productions. It was an unapproved submission for the 2024 Metro Manila Film Festival. The film released in the Philippines alongside Moana 2 and Huwag Mo 'Kong Iwan.

== Accolades ==
Accolades received by Idol: The April Boy Regino Story
Award	Date of ceremony	Category	Recipient(s)	Result	Ref.
73rd FAMAS Awards	August 22, 2025	Best Song	"Sa Likod ng Tagumpay" – Idol	Nominated	
41st Star Awards for Movies	November 30, 2025	New Movie Actor of the Year	John Arcenas	Nominated	
41st Star Awards for Movies	November 30, 2025	New Movie Actress of the Year	Kate Yalung	Nominated	
41st Star Awards for Movies	November 30, 2025	Indie Movie Theme Song of the Year	“Sa Likod Ng Tagumpay” – JC Regino	Nominated	
