= Secret Campus =

Secret Campus may refer to:

- Secret Campus (South Korean TV series), 2006 South Korean television series
- Secret Campus (Philippine TV series), 2023 Philippine television series

== See also ==
- Maid Sama!#Volume_list
- List of Teen Titans (TV series) characters#The_H.I.V.E._Academy
