= Carta Alas: Huwag Ka Nang Humirit =

Philippine action film

- Directed by: Jose N. Carreon
- Written by: Jose N. Carreon
- Produced by: Rose Flaminiano
- Starring: Ace Vergel; Antoinette Taus; Wowie de Guzman; Efren Reyes Jr.
- Cinematography: Romy Vitug
- Edited by: Orlando Vinarao
- Music by: Jaime Fabregas
- Production company: FLT Films
- Distributed by: FLT Films
- Release date: May 30, 2001
- Running time: 105 minutes
- Country: Philippines
- Language: Filipino

Carta Alas: Huwag Ka Nang Humirit is a 2001 Philippine action film written and directed by Jose N. Carreon. The film stars Ace Vergel, Antoinette Taus, Wowie de Guzman and Efren Reyes Jr.

== Cast ==
- Ace Vergel as Capt. Ted Cordero
- Antoinette Taus as Andy
- Wowie de Guzman as Glenn
- Piel Morena as Belinda
- Efren Reyes Jr. as Atty. Dax Imperial
- Dick Israel as Melvin
- Bob Soler as Mr. Sammy
- Jean Saburit as Col. Moreno
- Levi Ignacio as Anton
- Boy Roque as Kingston
- Alvin Anson as Ding
- Mar Garchitorena as Mayor
- Boy Gomez as Vincent
- July Hidalgo as Rupert
