= Miss Granny (2018 film) =

- Theatrical release poster
- Directed by: Joyce E. Bernal
- Screenplay by: Jinky Laurel
- Based on: Miss Granny (2014) by Shin Dong-ik, Hong Yun-jeong and Dong Hee-seon
- Produced by: Vic del Rosario Jr.
- Starring: Sarah Geronimo; James Reid; Xian Lim; Nova Villa
- Cinematography: Rody Lacap
- Edited by: Joyce Bernal; Kriselle G. Desuasido
- Music by: Len Calvo
- Production companies: CJ Entertainment; Viva Films; N^{2} Productions
- Distributed by: CJ Entertainment (South Korea); Viva Films (Philippines)
- Release date: August 22, 2018
- Running time: 114 minutes
- Country: Philippines
- Language: Filipino
- Box office: ₱140 million

Miss Granny is a 2018 Filipino musical comedy-drama film based on the South Korean film of the same name directed by Hwang Dong-hyuk. Directed by Joyce E. Bernal, it stars Sarah Geronimo, James Reid, Xian Lim, and Nova Villa. It was released by Viva Films on August 22, 2018, and was nominated for three FAMAS Awards including "Best Actress" for Sarah Geronimo and "Best Original Song" for Isa Pang Araw. It was the second most talked about Filipino film of 2018 on Twitter, The Hows of Us. Geronimo received "Best Actress" trophy at the 35th PMPC Star Awards for Movies, whilst Villa received the "Movie Supporting Actress of the Year" award at the 50th GMMSF Entertainment Box Office Awards. The film is also available for streaming on Netflix in the Philippines.

== Plot ==
Fely Malabaño, a widow, and her close friend Bert, who has known Fely since childhood, both work in a canteen. Lulu, a patron, regularly makes fun of Fely for being close to Bert. Fely frequently criticizes Angie, her daughter-in-law, for a variety of reasons such as her cooking and medicinal habits, but adores her grandchildren, Jeboy and Hana, as well as her son Ramoncito.

Angie suffers a stress-related collapse one day. Following the doctor's advice to keep Angie stress-free, Ramon proposes that Fely stay in a nursing home. Fely becomes furious after overhearing their conversation, but Jeboy later extends an invitation to dinner. Upon passing the Forever Young Photo Studio on her way to meet him, she runs into a photographer who offers to take a free portrait of her. Later, as she boards a bus, Fely is startled to discover that she has miraculously changed into her younger self after noticing her reflection in one of the passengers' sunglasses. Fely then assumes the identity of Audrey de Leon while residing in a flat rented out by Bert. Later, she joins her grandson's band as their main singer, shifting their emphasis from metal to love songs.

During one of the band's performances, Audrey performs a song in which she recounts her past. She relocated to Manila to support her son after her husband, a sailor, died while on duty. Ramoncito has a serious illness and nearly dies until a stranger intervenes to save him. Lorenz, a talent scout approaches Audrey during one of the band's performances and offers the group a chance to break into the mainstream.

Bert initially suspects Audrey of abducting and possibly killing Fely when he comes upon the dentures he gave her as a gift. After an attempt by Bert to capture her, Audrey comes clean and tells him to assure her family that she is doing well and asks for her bank accounts to be unfrozen. Audrey is forced to acknowledge their mortality after Lulu passes away. Bert notices that her youthful skin returns to its wrinkled state after she suffers a cut on her foot. Bert attends to the wound, but is confronted by his daughter Minnie, who evicts Audrey because she believes she is flirting with him. She stays at Lorenz's house, where they get along over old music. Lorenz's closeness to Audrey upsets Jeboy, and Audrey suspects that he might be attracted to her romantically. Since Jeboy is unaware that Audrey is his grandma, she rejects him and assaults him when he makes curt remarks, before treating him to a meal as she did when she was Fely.

Lorenz informs the band that they must perform without Jeboy during the Summerslam Concert after he is hit by a car on his way to the venue. Audrey initially objects to playing on, but ultimately agrees in order to keep Jeboy's band on the bill. Fely chooses to donate blood for Jeboy in the hospital, despite Bert's warnings of reverting to her elderly state. She is told by Ramoncito, who has realized her identity, to leave and lead the life she chooses. They embrace after Fely decides to stay and choose the life she had led as his mother. Fely then gives blood for her grandchild and returns to her elderly form.

A year later, Fely and her family attend Jeboy's concert with Hana as the band's new lead vocalist (as previously mentioned earlier in the film by Jeboy that Hana frequently goes to karaoke, with her friends). At a bus stop, Fely is approached by a motorbike driven by a young Bert, who encountered the Forever Young Photo Studio last night. Fely and Bert ride off after he presents her with a bunch of flowers, and Fely telling Bert to go to the Hospital later to donate his blood.

This ends with a voice over of Fely, telling the audiences to appreciate life and lived more while their not dead.

== Cast ==
- Sarah Geronimo as Audrey de Leon / young Fely
  - Nova Villa as Feliza "Fely" de Leon-Malabaño
- Xian Lim as Lorenz Milleza
- James Reid as Jeboy "Jebs" Malabaño
- Nonie Buencamino as Ramoncito D. Malabaño
- Lotlot de Leon as Angie Malabaño
- Boboy Garovillo as Bert
  - Sam Concepcion as young Bert
- Kim Molina as Minnie
- Ataska Mercado as Hannah Malabaño
- Danita Paner as Phoebe
- Marissa Delgado as Lulu Nemenso
- Kedebon Colim as Eric
- Pio Balbuena as Tim
- Angeli Bayani as Olivia
- Mara Lopez as Mia
- Jojit Lorenzo as the photographer at Forever Young Photo Studio
- Arvic Tan as Arturo Malabaño

== Soundtrack ==
Miss Granny (Original Movie Soundtrack)
No.	Title	Artist	Length
1.	"Kiss Me, Kiss Me"	Sarah Geronimo	3:29
2.	"Isa Pang Araw" (One More Day)	Sarah Geronimo	3:41
3.	"Rain"	Sarah Geronimo	3:44
4.	"Forbidden"	Sarah Geronimo	3:30
5.	"Pangarap Na Bituin" (Star We Dreamt)	Ataska	3:38

Kiss Me, Kiss Me (Miss Granny OST)
No.	Title	Artist	Length
1.	"Kiss Me, Kiss Me"	Sarah Geronimo	3:29

== Reception ==
=== Box office ===
The film set the record for the highest single day gross for a local movie released in 2018, gaining twenty million pesos on its fifth day of screening. While on its sixth day, the film gained another twenty million pesos. In less than ten days, the film reached the ₱100 million mark. Domestic gross reached ₱140 million on its third week.

=== Accolades ===
Year	Award	Category	Recipient	Result	Ref.
2018	RAWR Awards	Best Actress	Sarah Geronimo	Nominated	
2018	RAWR Awards	Movie ng Taon (Movie of the Year)	Miss Granny	Nominated	
2018	2nd Gawad Lasallianeta	Most Outstanding Filipino Film	Miss Granny	Nominated	
2019	Inside Showbiz Awards	Best Movie Actress	Sarah Geronimo	Nominated	
2019	Inside Showbiz Awards	Best Film	Miss Granny	Nominated	
2019	Inside Showbiz Awards	Best Movie Director	Joyce Bernal	Nominated	
2019	3rd GEMS Awards	Best Mainstream Film	Miss Granny	Nominated	
2019	3rd GEMS Awards	Best Actress	Sarah Geronimo	Nominated	
2019	3rd GEMS Awards	Best Supporting Actress	Nova Villa	Nominated	
2019	3rd GEMS Awards	Best Mainstream Film Director	Joyce Bernal	Nominated	
2019	67th FAMAS Awards	Best Actress	Sarah Geronimo	Nominated	
2019	67th FAMAS Awards	Best Song	"Isa Pang Araw"	Nominated	
2019	67th FAMAS Awards	Best Adapted Screenplay	Jinky Laurel	Nominated	
2019	35th PMPC Star Awards for Movies	Movie Actress of the Year	Sarah Geronimo	Won	
2019	35th PMPC Star Awards for Movies	Movie Supporting Actress of the Year	Nova Villa	Nominated	
2019	35th PMPC Star Awards for Movies	Movie Musical Scorer of the Year	Len Calvo	Won	
2019	42nd Gawad Urian	Best Supporting Actress	Nova Villa	Nominated	
2019	50th Box Office Entertainment Awards	Movie Supporting Actress of the Year	Nova Villa	Won	
2019	3rd Entertainment Editors' Choice Awards for Movies	Best Actress	Sarah Geronimo	Nominated	
2019	3rd Entertainment Editors' Choice Awards for Movies	Best Supporting Actress	Nova Villa	Nominated	
2019	3rd Entertainment Editors' Choice Awards for Movies	Best Visual Effects	Miss Granny	Nominated	
2019	3rd Entertainment Editors' Choice Awards for Movies	Best Original Theme Song	"Isa Pang Araw"	Nominated	
2019	32nd Awit Awards	Best Performance by a Female Recording Artist	"Isa Pang Araw"	Won	
2019	32nd Awit Awards	Best Song Written for Movie/TV/Stage Play	"Isa Pang Araw"	Won	
