= Romance Reboot =

Movie connected to AI and robotics

- Directed by: Jules Katanyag
- Written by: Erwin Blanco; Trisha Mae Delez
- Produced by: Carlo Katigbak; Cory Vidanes; Jamie Lopez
- Starring: Kaori Oinuma; Emilio Daez; Shanaia Gomez
- Production company: Mavx Productions
- Distributed by: iWant
- Release date: October 17, 2025
- Running time: 1 hr 24 min
- Country: Philippines
- Language: Filipino

Romance Reboot is a Philippine romantic film directed by Jules Katanyag. This series top-billed by Kaori Oinuma, Emilio Daez and Shanaia Gomez, premieres on October 17, 2025, on iWant.

== Premise ==
Enzo, is a photography enthusiast from a well-off family in the Philippines, struggles to find a photography related job in Australia. He moved to Australia with his partner Kai, who juggles between her job in the cafe and taking menial jobs in the hope of finding stable life.

Their fragile relationship was further put into test on the arrival of the AI robot, McKenna, which bought disruptions in the couple's dynamics and sparks misunderstanding between the two.

== Cast ==
Main cast

- Kaori Oinuma as Kai
- Emilio Daez as Enzo
- Shanaia Gomez as McKenna

Support cast/ cameo

- Maria Rianne Castro
- Jules Katanyag

== Filming and promotions ==
=== Filming ===
The four-day shoot took place in July 2025 in Sydney, Australia, with Mavx Productions sharing some behind-the-scenes photos of the actors, crew and filming set.

=== Promotion ===
In early June 2025, photos and videos of the actors' look test surfaced the internet hinting about an upcoming film or series. It was later confirmed that both Oinuma and Gomez will headline an iWant original movie, when the two actresses performed in the streaming platform's new app launch event held on July 9, 2025.

The film's official teaser was released by Mavx Productions and iWant on October 1, 2025. On October 5, 2025, the lead-actors made a guest appearance in iWant ASAP for the official poster reveal.

The official trailer of the film was released on October 11, 2025, and the following day, October 12, 2025, a special advance screening was held for fans, celebrity friends and content creators.

== Reception ==
The film claimed the top spot on iWant's Top Movies chart over the weekend after it premiered in the streaming platform last October 17, 2025.
