= Secret Campus (Philippine TV series) =

Philippine anthology streaming television series

- Genre: Romantic drama Anthology
- Written by: Lino Balmes
- Directed by: Jose Javier Reyes
- Starring: Angela Morena; Ataska Mercado; Angelica Hart; Azi Acosta
- Theme music composer: Emerzon Texon
- Country of origin: Philippines
- Original language: Filipino
- No. of episodes: 4

Production
- Producers: Vicente G. del Rosario III; Valerie S. Del Rosario
- Cinematography: Jeyow Evangelista
- Editor: Beng Bandong
- Camera setup: Multi-camera
- Running time: 43–45 minutes
- Production company: LargaVista Entertainment

Original release
- Network: Vivamax
- Release: 27 August 2023

Secret Campus is a Philippine anthology streaming television series written by Lino Balmes and directed by Jose Javier Reyes. Produced by Vicente G. del Rosario III and Valerie S. Del Rosario under LargaVista Entertainment, the series features Angela Morena, Ataska Mercado, Angelica Hart and Azi Acosta. It premiered on August 25, 2023, on Vivamax.

== Cast ==
- Azi Acosta
- Angela Morena
- Ataska Mercado
- Angelica Hart
- Arron Villaflor
- Victor Relosa
- Armina Alegre
- Clifford Pusing
- Aerol Carmelo
- CJ Jaravata
- Jem Milton
- Roi Alonte
- Jaggy Lejano
- Chad Alviar
- Ali Asaytona
- Enzo Santiago
- RJ de Vera
- Aaron Concepcion
- Erlinda Villalobos

== Episodes ==
No.	Title	Original release date
1	"Clea"	26 February 2023
2	"Andi"	3 September 2023
3	"Eunice"	10 September 2023
4	"Myra"	17 September 2023

== Production ==
The series was announced by LargaVista Entertainment on Vivamax consisting of four episodes. Angela Morena, Ataska Mercado, Angelica Hart and Azi Acosta were cast to appear in the series.

The trailer of the series was released on August 25, 2023.
