= Ataska Mercado =

Filipino actress and singer (born 2002)

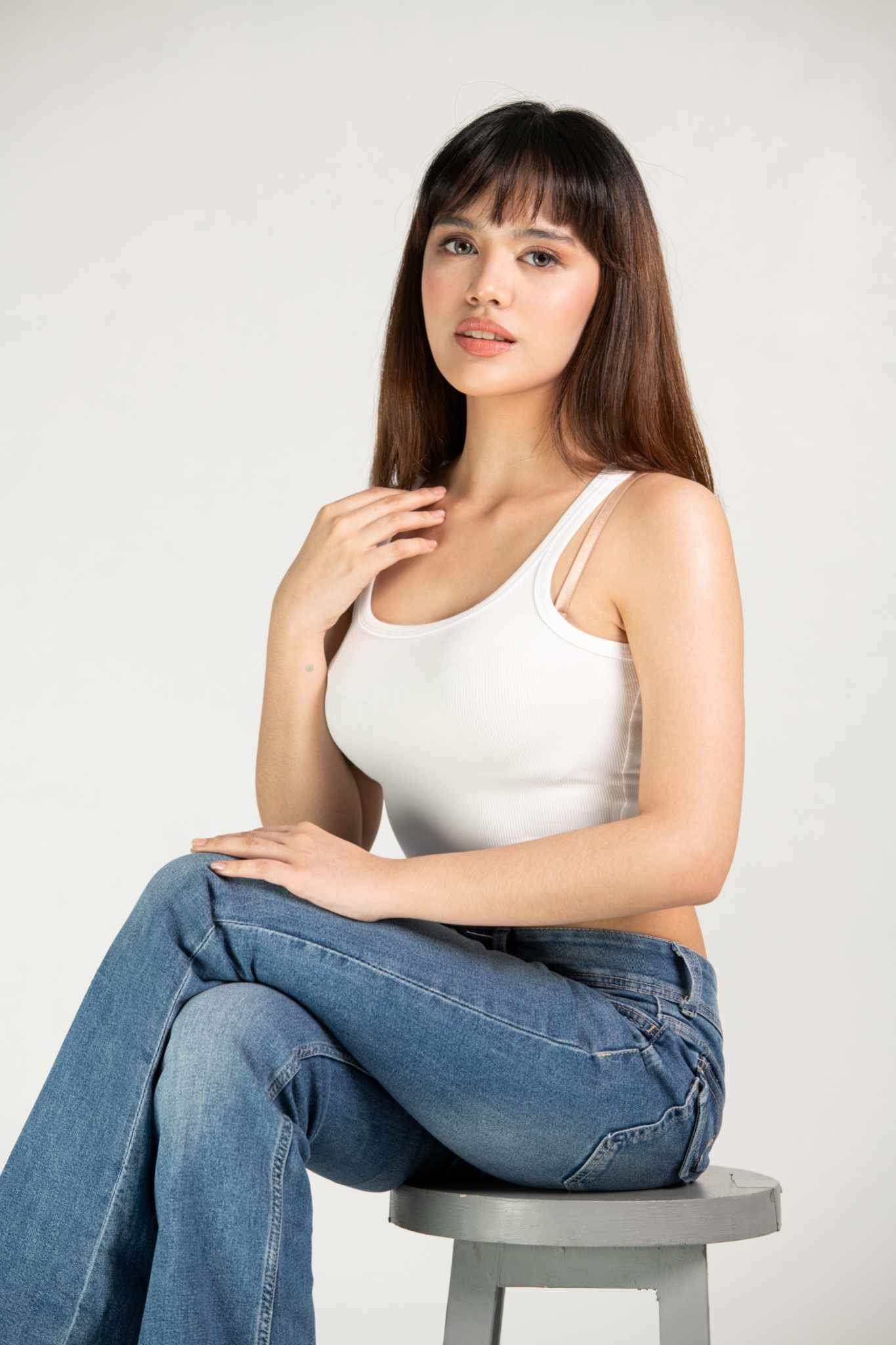
- Born: Atascha Chloe Mercado; February 2, 2002 (age 24); Quezon City, Philippines
- Occupations: Actress; television personality; singer; songwriter; host
- Years active: 2011–present
- Agent: Viva Artists Agency and Viva Records (2015–present)

Atascha Chloe "Ataska" Mercado (born February 2, 2002) is a Filipino actress, host, songwriter and singer. She is dubbed as the "Vivamax Princess" by the industry. In 2009, she was crowned as Lil' Earth Angel-Eco Tourism during Miss Lil' Earth Angels 2009 at Miss Philippines Earth 2009. She joined the second season of The Voice Kids Philippines and got a three-chair turn. She was a theater actress for plays such as Wizard of Oz, Peter Pan and Annie where she played as Pepper. She is Pasig River Rehabilitation Commission Ambassador from 2018 to the present. She is a former member of the girl group, SNTA, managed by Viva Artists Agency.

Ataska is PH Beauties' (PHB) No. 1 in their 100 Hottest Women of 2025 list and No. 7 on their 100 Hottest Women of 2026 list. In addition, she was ranked No. 92 on their list of the Top 100 Most Beautiful Filipinas of 2026.

Coveted Asia, a premier digital media platform and home of Asia's most coveted rankings, list, and recognitions, named Ataska as the Top 8 Most Beautiful Woman in Asia in there "Top 100 Most Beautiful Women in Asia 2026" list.

== Filmography ==
=== Television show / series ===
Year	Title	Role	Ref
2011	Time of My Life	Young Zaira	
2015	The Voice Kids Philippines (season 2)	Herself (contestant)	
2016	Letters and Music	Herself (celebrity guest)	
2017	Taddy Taddy Po	Paige	
2018	One Song	Rose	
2019	OPM TV	VJ Ataska	
2024	It's Showtime	Herself (Expecially For You segment)	
2024	Family Feud	Herself (celebrity contestant)	
2024	The Boobay and Tekla Show	Herself (celebrity guest)	
2025	TiktoClock	Herself (celebrity guest)	
2026	TiktoClock	Herself (celebrity guest)	

=== Web series ===
Year	Title	Role	Ref
2023	Secret Campus	Andi	
2023	Halo-Halo X	Melissa	

=== Theater ===
Year	Title	Role	Ref
2016	Annie	Pepper	

=== Film ===
Year	Title	Role	Ref
2018	Miss Granny	Hana	
2021	Sensitive and in Love	Ataska	
2022	How to Love Mr. Heartless	Amy	
2023	Bugaw	Lydia	
2023	Bisyo!	Lisa	
2024	Mapanukso	Tanya	
2024	Sweet Release	Rian	
2024	Elevator	Erika	
2024	Sisid Marino	Flor	
2024	Uhaw	Rejoice	
2024	Lamas	Mona	
2025	Teresa	Ms. Joan Alvarez	
2025	Deep Inside Angeli Khang	Host	
2025	Kama Sutra	Host	
2026	Pinay Kama Sutra	Herself/Host	
2026	Violet (short film)	Lily	

== Discography ==
Singles

- Atras Abante Ka (2016)
- If I Fall in Love (2016)
- Pana (2017)
- Ilog Pasig (2017)
- Pangarap na Bituin (2018)
- Kelan Kaya? (for PhilPop) (2018)
- 18 (2020)
- Kahit Sandali (2021)
- Marupok (2022)
- Kahit Na (2023)
- Dilim (2024)
- Di INIBIG (2024)

Soundtracks

Viva Films

- Miss Granny (2018 film) (Pangarap na Bituin)
- The Ship Show (Marupok)

VMX (streaming service)

- Bula (Pangarap na Bituim)
- Haliparot (Kahit Na)
- Katas (Dilim)
- Kamadora (Marupok)

Concerts

- Padayon benefit concert for Caritas
- The Voice Kids Boses Ng Bulilit Muling Bibirit

== Awards and recognition ==
Award ceremony	Year	Category	Nominee(s)/work(s)	Result	Ref
Wish 107.5 Music Awards	2017	Wish Young Artist of the Year		Nominated	
Philippine Popular Music Festival	2018	Song Interpreter	Kelan Kaya	Semi-Finalist	
30th Awit Awards	2018	Best Performance by a New Female Recording Artist	If I Fall in Love	Nominated	
Lustre Awards 2024	2024	Most Promising Actress of the Year		Won	
7th VP Choice Awards	2025	Sexiest Female		Nominated	
Pinay Beauties PH Hottest Women 2025	2025	Top 100 Hottest Women 2025		Rank 1	
