= April Boy Regino =

Filipino singer and actor (1961–2020)

- Publicity image, c. 1990s

Background information
- Born: Dennis Magloyuan Regino; April 9, 1961; Marikina, Rizal, Philippines (Note: Marikina was a municipality in Rizal until before the establishment of Metropolitan Manila Area on November 7, 1975.)
- Died: November 29, 2020 (aged 59) Antipolo, Rizal, Philippines
- Genres: Pinoy pop; novelty
- Occupations: Singer; songwriter; musician; actor; comedian
- Instruments: Vocals; guitar
- Years active: 1979–2014; 2015–2020
- Labels: Vicor; Ivory Music; Star Music; VIVA; GMA
- Formerly of: April Boys

Dennis Magloyuan Regino (April 9, 1961 – November 29, 2020), (Note: Early sources stated that Regino died at the age of 51 and at the time of the announcement, there was a brief confusion with his real age due to Wikipedia stating that he was born in 1969, and probably this was the basis used by news organizations when they announced the death of the singer. And fortunately, the statement has been corrected to 1961 following the news articles released during the time of Regino's death.) known professionally as April Boy Regino (Tagalog: [rɛˈhino]), was a Filipino singer, songwriter, and actor who popularized ballads such as "Paano ang Puso Ko", "Umiiyak ang Puso" and "Di Ko Kayang Tanggapin" in the 1990s and novelty songs such as "Ye Ye Vonnel". He always wore a baseball cap in public as a trademark. As of 2005, Regino has sold over 500,000 albums in the Philippines.

== Early life ==
April Magloyuan Regino was born on April 9, 1961, in Marikina. He was the fourth of Tomas and Lucena's eight children, and grew up in a slum near the railway track in Caloocan.

As a child, he helped his parents sell snacks (rice cakes, banana cue and camote cue), and customers would often ask him to sing. At age 10, he began joining amateur singing contests for the prize money. He left school after sixth grade to focus on singing, and aside from contests, he also performed in local fiestas and as an opening act for other musicians. At age 18, he became a singer in Japan.

== Music career ==
Regino returned to the Philippines in 1993, and together with his brothers Vingo and Jimmy, formed the musical group April Boys. Their debut song, "Sana'y Laging Magkapiling", became widely popular. However, in 1995, Regino left the group to pursue a solo career. In a 2015 interview with Jessica Soho, he explained that the brothers competed among themselves which led to sulking, but they later reconciled.

His debut solo album, Umiiyak ang Puso, was released in 1995 under Ivory Music and sold 120,000 units (triple platinum). The song of the same name won Best Country-Ballad Recording in that year's Awit Awards.

He migrated to the United States and was based there as an entertainer to the Filipino-American community. He was a contract recording artist with Viva Records.

He also did a Tagalog and English cover version of the Southern All Stars song いとしのエリー("Itoshi no Ellie"), renaming it "Honey My Love So Sweet".

In 2015 after a year off, Regino returned to music with his brand new album and a new music company, GMA Music.

== Personal life ==
Regino was married to Madelyn Regino. The couple had a son named JC and daughter named Charm. JC Regino followed his father's footsteps as a singer and composer.

Regino took his Oath as a United States citizen in March 2011.

== Ilness and death ==
In 2009, Regino was diagnosed with prostate cancer while living in the United States. In 2013, he announced that he was already cancer-free after years of battling the illness. In 2015, the singer shared that he had diabetic retinopathy, which is an eye condition that can cause vision loss and blindness in people with diabetes.

At 1:00 a.m. of November 29, 2020, Regino was rushed by his brother Vingo to the Metro Antipolo Hospital and Medical Center in Antipolo. He was diagnosed with chronic kidney disease and acute respiratory failure. He was scheduled to undergo dialysis however it did not take place during that time. Regino died at 3:00 a.m., at the age of 59. He was survived by his widow, Madelyn and two children, JC and Charmaine. On December 6, Regino was entombed in his mausoleum at Valley of Sympathy Memorial Park, Antipolo, Rizal.

== Discography ==
=== Studio albums ===
List of studio albums, with sales figures and certifications
Title	Album details	Sales	Certifications	Ref.
Umiiyak ang Puso	Released: 1995	PHI: 120,000	PARI: 3× Platinum	
Idol	Released: 1996			
Jukebox Idol	Released: 1997	PHI: 40,000	PARI: Platinum	
Idol Ko, Idol Nato	Released: 1997	PHI: 40,000	PARI: Platinum	
Salamat Sa'yo	Released: 1998	PHI: 40,000	PARI: Platinum	
Super Idol	Released: 2000	PHI: 80,000	PARI: 2× Platinum	
Diary (Old Songs 1950-1970)	Released: 2000			
The Legends Series: April Boy Regino Greatest Hits	Released: 2001			
Philippine Idol	Released: September 2, 2002			
Ang Tunay na Idol	Released: 2004			
Idol Star	Released: 2010			

=== Compilation albums ===
- Hit Platinum Series: April Boy Regino (1999)
- Legends Series: April Boy Regino (Greatest Hits) (2002)
- The Very Best Of: April Boy Regino (2003)
- Kay Tagal (2004)

=== Inspirational albums ===
- Hesus, Tanging Hiling (2015)

=== Songs ===
- 1993: Dugong Pilipino (with April Boys)
- 1993: Isa't Isa'y Mahal
- 1993: Sana'y Ikaw Ay Magbalik
- 1993: Muli Mong Mahalin
- 1993: Sana'y Laging Magkapiling
- 1993: Bakit Kita Mahal
- 1995: Umiiyak ang Puso
- 1995: Nasaan Ka, Kailangan Kita (Sa Gabi Di Makatulog)
- 1995: Pinakamamahal Kita
- 1995: Mayroon Pang Pag-asa
- 1995: Sana'y Laging Magkapiling (New Version)
- 1995: Tunay Na Mamahalin
- 1995: Kahit Na Puso Ay Masaktan
- 1995: Katapusan Na Ng Pag-ibig
- 1995: Ayos Ba Tayo Dyan
- 1996: Idol
- 1996: Paano ang Puso Ko
- 1996: Kahit Na May Ibang Mahal Ang Puso Mo
- 1996: Hanggang Doon Sa Langit
- 1996: Pangarap Ng Ama't Ina
- 1996: (Alam Mo Bang) Mahal Pa Rin Kita
- 1996: Walang Hanggan
- 1996: Princesa Ng Buhay Ko
- 1996: Umaasa Ka
- 1996: Set You Free
- 1997: Pag-ibig Mo, Pag-ibig Ko
- 1997: Kahit Kaibigan Lang
- 1997: Patawarin Mo Ako
- 1997: Labis Na Pagmamahal
- 1997: Sa Panaginip Lang
- 1997: Esperanza (From "Esperanza")
- 1997: Mahal na Mahal na Mahal Kita
- 1997: Di Ko Kayang Tanggapin
- 1997: Masaya Na Ang Puso Ko
- 1997: Tanging Sa'yo
- 1997: Mag-Unsa Na Ako
- 1997: Sa Damgo Mobalik Na
- 1997: Hain Ka Na, Kinahanglan Kita
- 1997: Way Katapusang Gugma
- 1997: Salig Lang
- 1997: Laumi Lang
- 1997: Kaloy-i
- 1997: Ikaw Lang Wa Nay Lain
- 1997: Bisan Pa
- 1997: Naghilak Ang Kasing-Kasing
- 1998: Salamat Sa Iyo
- 1998: Muli
- 1998: Sabi Ng Puso Ko
- 1998: Pangako Ko
- 1998: Sana Tayong Dalawa
- 1998: Di Ka Na Others
- 1998: I Can't Stop Loving You
- 1998: Kung Sakali
- 1998: Bakit May Kirot Pa Rin
- 1998: Kay Tagal (From "Kay Tagal Kang Hinintay")
- 1998: Tukaan
- 1999: Bulong Ng Damdamin
- 2000: Huwag Kang Manghinayang
- 2000: Kahapong Nagdaan (Ayoko ng Balikan)
- 2000: Kumusta Mga Kaibigan
- 2000: Awit Ng Pag-ibig
- 2000: Bakit Ikaw Pa
- 2000: Huwag Pilitin (with Ciara Sotto)
- 2000: Babe
- 2000: Paniwala
- 2000: Kung Alam Mo Lang
- 2000: Aalis Ka Ba
- 2001: The Diary
- 2001: I Started A Joke
- 2001: Help Me Make It Through The Night
- 2001: End Of The World
- 2001: The Great Pretender
- 2001: You Don't Know Me
- 2001: You Are My Destiny
- 2001: Daddy's Home
- 2001: You Mean Everything To Me
- 2001: Don't Ever Leave Me
- 2001: I'll Never Fall In Love Again
- 2001: Am I That Easy To Forget
- 2002: Sayang Na Pagmamahal
- 2002: Sa'yo Lamang
- 2002: Kailan Kaya
- 2002: Bagong Pag-asa
- 2002: Lihim Na Pag-ibig
- 2002: Di Ko Makakalimutan
- 2002: Kung Kailan Mahal
- 2002: Pagmamahal At Pag-ibig
- 2004: 1-2-8
- 2004: Di Ko Kayang Malayo Sa'yo
- 2004: Baka Merong Iba
- 2004: Umiibig Na Nga
- 2004: Ikaw Lamang Mahal
- 2004: Habang-Buhay
- 2004: Nanghihinayang Ako
- 2004: Madelyn (Nag-iisang Ginto)
- 2004: Pasumpa-sumpa
- 2004: Ye Ye Vonnel
- 2010: Di Na Ako Iibig Pang Muli (with JC Regino)
- 2010: Hanggang Sa Dulo Ng Aking Buhay (with JC Regino)
- 2010: Pangarap Ko'y Makapiling Ka
- 2010 Tanggap Ko Na
- 2010: Siya Ba O Ako
- 2015: Tanging Hiling
- 2015: Hesus
- 2015: Salamat Diyos
- 2015: Ang Tanging Alay Ko
- 2015: Taos Pusong Pasasalamat
- 2015: Agos Ng Tubig Sa Batis
- 2015: Tupang Ligaw
- 2015: Diyos Ang Kasagutan
- 2015: Si Hesus Tanging Pag-asa
- 2019: Hanggang Sa Wakas

== Filmography ==
=== Film ===
- Ang Misis Kong Hoodlum (1996)
- Home Along Da Riles 2 (1997) (special participation)
- Takot Ako sa Darling Ko (1997)
- Di Ko Kayang Tanggapin (2000)
- Super Idol (2001)
- Ang Tanging Ina N'yong Lahat (2008) (special participation)
- This Guy's in Love with U Mare! (2012) (special participation)
