= Shanaia Gomez =

Filipino actress (born 2002)

- Born: May 15, 2002 (age 24); Dublin, Ireland
- Occupations: Actress; singer; host
- Years active: 2017–present
- Agents: GMA Artist Center (2017–2019) Star Magic (2019–present); Rise Artists Studio (2021–present)
- Height: 1.58 m (5 ft 2 in)
- Musical career
- Genre: OPM
- Years active: 2022–present
- Label: StarPop (2022–present)

Shanaia Gomez (born May 15, 2002) is an Irish-born Canadian actress and singer based in the Philippines. She is best known for appearing in the 10th season of the ABS-CBN reality show Pinoy Big Brother.

== Early life ==
Shanaia Gomez was born on May 15, 2002 in Dublin, Ireland to a Filipino mother from Talisay, Cebu and an Italian father. Her parents were separated since her birth and she has never met her father. Gomez has one older sibling from her mother's previous relationship. She and her family relocated to Canada a few years after her birth. Gomez's mother has been in a same-sex relationship since she was a child; in an interview, Gomez said she is very close with her stepmother.

== Career ==
=== 2016–2019: Career beginnings ===
In 2016, Gomez had a vacation in Manila, Philippines for the first time. During her stay, she tried VTR go-sees and eventually landed a role in a Maggi commercial with actor Ian Veneracion. In the same year, she won first runner-up in the 2016 Miss Philippines Canada.

In 2017, at the age 14, she went back to the Philippines again to try her luck and pursue a career in the showbiz industry. She started her career on GMA, but since she didn't speak any Tagalog at that time, projects were a little hard for her.

In 2019, she auditioned for the singing competition Idol Philippines. She made it until the mid-rounds.

=== 2021–present: BearKada, PBB, and He's Into Her ===
In 2021, she was among the 2nd batch of artists to be signed to Star Magic and its subsidiary Rise Artist Studio. She regularly hosts for the studio's online show We Rise Together along with DJ Jai Ho and the other Rise artists. She also became a part of the He's Into Her series' BearKada and hosted the online show BearKada Hangout along with Bianca De Vera, River Joseph, Jae Miranda, and Milo Elmido Jr. where they hangout with the casts of He's Into Her every after an episode is aired.

Following the success of He's Into Her, the casts of the show headlined a special online concert, He's Into Her: The Benison Ball. Gomez, and the other BearKada were the chosen hosts for the show.

In the same year, she joined the 10th season of Pinoy Big Brother—Pinoy Big Brother: Kumunity Season 10 as part of the first batch of housemates in the Celebrity Edition, having been evicted on day 57 alongside fellow housemate Benedix Ramos.

In 2022, she made her acting debut as she starred in the third season of iWantTFC's original anthology series, Click, Like, Share for the episode Swap with fellow Rise artist Belle Mariano.

In February, her fellow housemates Alexa Ilacad and KD Estrada (a.k.a. KDLex) headlined their own fan concert through KTX.ph entitled Closer: The KDLex Fan Con. She appeared on the concert as one of the guest performers and sang Girlfriend—a song she co-wrote with fellow housemates Kyle Echarri and KD Estrada while they were inside the Big Brother House.

From being a BearKada, Gomez became Dominique as she was among the additional casts that joined the second season of the breakthrough series He's Into Her.

In the same year, The second season of reality singing television competition Idol Philippines premiered on June 25, 2022, on Kapamilya Channel, A2Z and TV5. An online show, titled The Next Idol PH, airs on the show's UpLive account and on Kapamilya Online Live during commercial breaks. The show is hosted by the show's former contestants: Gomez, together with Anji Salvacion, Matty Juniosa, Enzo Almario, Lucas Garcia, Gello Marquez, and Fana. The show airs live via Zoom from the hosts' respective places at the time of the show's broadcast (prior to Live Shows). The show usually interviews the season's contestants following their performances on the show's broadcast.

In July, Gomez released her debut single "Para Sa'yo." Released under Star Pop, the hopeful and upbeat song narrates the positive impact an uplifting relationship can have on a person.

== Filmography ==
=== Television/Digital ===
Year	Title	Role	Note	Ref.
2019	Idol Philippines	Contestant	Credited as "Shai Gomez"; Eliminated in the Group round	
2021	Pinoy Big Brother: Kumunity Season 10	Herself, Celebrity Housemate	Evicted on Day 57	
2021	It's Showtime	Guest player, Madlang Pi-POLL	with Benedix Ramos and Karen Bordador	
2022	Click, Like, Share: Season 3	Jenny	Episode: Swap	
2022	Magandang Buhay	Herself, Guest		
2022	He's Into Her (Season 2)	Dominique "Dom" Rossi		
2022	Idol Philippines (season 2)	Herself, Guest Performer		
2022	Love Bites	DJ Mia "Em-em"	Episode: TOTGA	
2023	Teen Clash	Jia	Episode 1	
2023	FPJ's Batang Quiapo	Selene	Chapter 2	
2023	Can't Buy Me Love	Kara	Episodes 16, 17 & 23	
2024	Letters and Music	Herself/ Guest	Spelling Bee promo	
2024	I Can See Your Voice	Herself/ Guest Sing-vestigator	Season 5, Episode 87	
2024	Rainbow Rumble	Herself/ Contestant	w/ iWant ASAP hosts	
2024	It's Showtime	Herself/ Guest	Throwbox	
2025	Idol Kids Philippines	Herself/ Online host	Idol Kids Philippines Spotlight	
2025	It's Okay to Not Be Okay	Vlogger	Episode 5: Made By Scars/Episode 7: Shadow Break	
2025	What Lies Beneath	Vlogger		

=== TV Commercial ===
Year	Brand/Product	Ref./ Notes
2017	Maggi Sinigang Green Mango	with Ian Veneracion
2017	Boysen Roofguard	ep. Tuloy
2018	EO Executive Optical	
2018	Rebisco Combi	ep. Order
2020	Selecta Cornetto	ep. Dream
2021	Clover Chips	ep. Clover is Love
2021	Kopiko Brown Coffee	with Inigo Pascual

=== Movie ===
Year	Title	Role	Notes/ Ref.
2018	A Dream Like Mine	Angela Reyez	short film by Sunsilk
2023	Rewind	Austin's wife	cameo role
2024	The Gatekeeper	Cita	
2025	Sosyal Climbers	Carlotta	
2025	Romance Reboot	McKenna	

=== Theater ===
Year	Title	Role	Ref
2024	The 25th Annual Putnam County Spelling Bee	Marcy Park	
2024	Once on This Island	Andrea Deveraux	
2024	TAYMPERS The Musical	Joy	

=== Shows hosted ===
Year	Title
2021–2022	We Rise Together
2021–2022	BearKada Hangout
2022	Quiz Mo Ko
2022	The Next Idol PH
2022–2024	iWant ASAP
2023	Clash Room
2023-2024	BRGY
2025	Idol Kids Philippines Spotlight

=== Concerts ===
==== Online ====
Year	Title	Role
2021	He's Into Her: The Benison Ball	Host
2022	Closer: The KDLex Fan Con	Guest Performer

==== Live ====
Year	Title	Venue
2022	Star Magic 30: Beyond The Stars (Manila Show)	Newport Performing Arts Theater, Resorts World Manila
2022	He's Into Her: All Access	Araneta Center
2023	Nylon Manila Big Bold Brave Awards	Clubhouse MNL

=== Music video ===
Year	Title	Song Artist	Label	Ref.
2022	Diwata	Sam Concepcion	Star Music	
2022	Ikaw Ang	Sam Concepcion, Mooph and Yuridope	Tarsier Records	
2022	Para Sa'yo	Herself	Star Music	
2022	Awake	Herself	Star Music	
2023	Happy You Stayed	SAB	Tarsier Records	
2023	Ganun Talaga	Drei Sugay	Star Music	
2024	Slow Dancing	Herself	Star Music	
2025	Exam	Ben Mara	Star Music	

== Discography ==
=== Singles ===
Year	Title	Label	Ref.
2022	Para Sa'yo	Star Pop	
2022	Awake	Star Pop	
2024	Slow Dancing	Star Pop	
2024	Cloud 9	Star Pop	
2025	State of Mind	Star Pop	
2025	Tried To Tell You	Star Pop	

=== Appears On ===
Year	Title	Event	Label	Performed by
2022	Heartbreak Avenue - Live	SHE@Twenty (Live)	Star Music	SAB, Shanaia Gomez
2022	I'd Like To - Live	SHE@Twenty (Live)	Star Music	SAB, Angela Ken, Shanaia Gomez, Anji Salvacion
2022	Tayo ang Ligaya ng Isa't-Isa - Extended Version	ABS-CBN Christmas Station ID	Star Music	Star Music, Star Pop, Tarsier Records and DNA recording artists
2023	Pasko ang Pinakamagandang Kwento - Extended Version	ABS-CBN Christmas Station ID	Star Music	Star Music, Star Pop, Tarsier Records and DNA recording artists
