= Efren Reyes Jr. =

Filipino actor (born 1961)

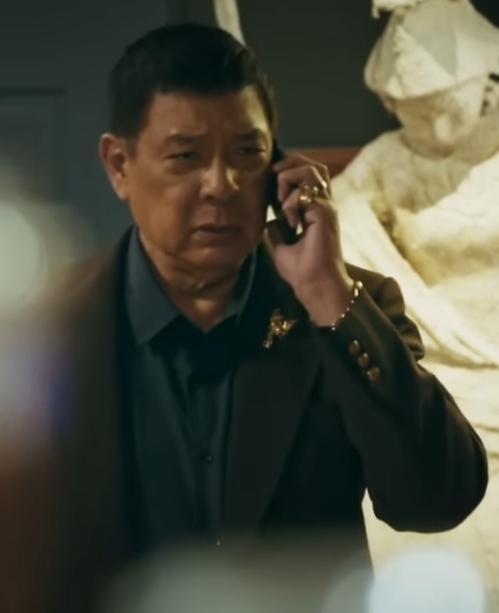
- Born: Jun William M. Reyes; June 25, 1961 (age 65); Manila, Philippines
- Other name: Jun
- Occupations: Actor; writer; director
- Years active: 1967–present
- Height: 176 cm (5 ft 9 in)
- Parent(s): Efren Reyes Sr. (father); Virginia Montes (mother)
- Family: Cristina Reyes (sister)

Jun William M. Reyes (born June 25, 1961) also known as Efren Reyes Jr. is a Filipino actor known for his roles in action films. The son of Efren Reyes Sr., he is also a writer and director.

Reyes was first introduced as a child actor in the movie Eskinita 29 in 1968, then later he became an action star in the 1980s, and then took roles as either a main villain or as a supporting character from 1989 up to the present in Philippine films and television series.

== Early life ==
Reyes was born on June 25, 1961, in Manila. He is a fourth generation artist being the son of the late actor, writer, director and film producer Efren Reyes Sr. and actress Virginia Montes. He is the brother of actress, Cristina Reyes. He is the nephew of actors Johnny Reyes and Tessie Quintana, the grandson of writer Pedrito Reyes, and is the great grandson of playwright Severino Reyes who is also known as "Lola Basyang" and is called "the Father of Philippine Sarsuela". His cousin, James Reyes, was a successful fashion designer.

== Career ==
Reyes portrays a lead role in an action films of early 1980's such for Siga, Anak ng Maton, Maskarado and Pepeng Karbin. he works for his team up with Jess Lapid Jr. in Kaliwete Brothers, with Vic Vargas in Utol, with Bembol Roco and Tony Ferrer in Over My Dead Body, Roy Flores in Digmaan Sa Pagitan ng Langit at Lupa, Ramon Zamora and Mohammed Faisal in Operation: Central Luzon and Rhene Imperial and Bembol Roco in Sigue Sigue Brothers. In his last lead roles in an action films Tapos na ang Lahi Mo, Hadji Djakiri in 1990 and Nestor Solis, Hari ng Oxo in 1995.

He is co-starred in the romantic comedy film in 1981 with Gabby Concepcion and Nora Aunor in Totoo Ba Ang Tsismis? and a campus romantic comedy drama film of 1982 with Snooky Serna, Dina Bonnevie and Maricel Soriano in School Girls.

Then he played villain roles for four straight films in Isusumpa Mo Ang Araw Nang Isilang Ka, Tatak ng Isang Api, Delima Gang, and Huminga Ka Hangga't Gusto Mo. As not to be typecast as a villain, he took the lead role in the film Emong Mercenario.

In 1994, he also starred in Tapang Kung Tapang which was led by Lito Lapid and Cynthia Luster and in the comedy Megamol. In 1998, he played Princess Punzalan's husband in the series Mula Sa Puso.

In 2001, Reyes Jr. played the villain alongside Dick Israel in the film Carta Alas: Huwag Ka Nang Humirit. In 2002, he joined the cast of the series Bituin which starred Nora Aunor. In 2008, he joined the cast of MMFF entry Anak ng Kumander.

In 2012, Reyes Jr. played Faruq Ghazi, a rival clan head in the action film Muslim Magnum .357: To Serve and Protect, a remake of the 1986 film Muslim .357. In 2016, he joined the cast of the series Tubig at Langis, the remake of the 1980 film of the same name. He also appeared in the action series Ang Probinsyano along with other former action stars. He then played Mayor Rodrigo Duterte in the biopic Bato (The General Ronald dela Rosa Story). In 2020, Reyes Jr. joined the cast of the superhero series Bella Bandida.

In 2024, Reyes wrote and directed the biographical film Idol: The April Boy Regino Story.

== Political views ==
In 2004, Reyes Jr. supported Fernando Poe Jr.'s presidential campaign. A year later, he joined other actors including Susan Roces (the widow of Poe Jr.), Gladys Guevarra, Richard Gomez and more in a rally calling for the resignation of President Gloria Macapagal Arroyo.

== Filmography ==
=== Film ===
==== As an actor ====
- Eskinita 29 (1967)
- Siga (1980)
- Anak ng Maton (1980)
- Kaliwete Brothers (1980)
- Totoo Ba Ang Tsismis? (1981)
- Caged Fury (1981) - as Pram Van Tin
- Maskarado (1982)
- School Girls (1982) - Manuel
- Utol (1983)
- Over My Dead Body (1983)
- Kumusta Ka Hudas? (1984)
- Pieta Ikalawang Aklat (1984) - Greggy Martinez
- Digmaan sa Pagitan ng Langit at Lupa (1984)
- Pepeng Karbin (1984) - Pepeng Karbin
- Operation: Central Luzon (1985)
- Sigue-Sigue Brothers (1985)
- Isusumpa Mo ang Araw Nang Isilang Ka (1985) - Nick
- Vengeance Squad (1986)
- Gabi Na, Kumander (1986) – Lt. Carruncho
- Mula Paa Hanggang Ulo (1989)
- Tatak ng Isang Api (1989)
- Delima Gang (1989)
- Emong Mercenario (1989)
- Bala at Rosaryo (1990) - Gordon
- Hukom .45 (1990)
- Angel Molave (1990) - Boy Lee
- Tapos Na ang Lahi Mo, Hadji Djakiri (1990) - Hadji Djakiri
- Kaaway ng Batas (1990) - Mike
- Walang Piring ang Katarungan (1990)
- Sagad Hanggang Buto (1991)
- Sgt. Patalinhug, CIS Special Operations Group (1991)
- Kung Patatawarin Ka ng Bala Ko (1991)
- Sgt. Ernesto Baliola: Tinik sa Batas (1992) - Atty. Petaga
- Basagulero (1992) - Boy
- Totoy Guwapo Alyas Kanto Boy (1992)
- Lakay (1992) - Waway
- Tondo, Libingan ng Mga Siga (1992)
- Lt. Napoleon Velasco, Alyas Kumander Kalbo (1993)
- Alejandro "Diablo" Malubay (1993)
- Dodong Armado (1993)
- Geron Olivar (1993)
- Rodel Sta. Cruz: Halang ang Bituka (1993) –Joaquin "Jake" Montalbo
- Masahol Pa sa Hayop (1993) – Sgt. Ramirez
- Macario Durano (1994)
- Nagkataon, Nagkatagpo (1994) - Gardo
- Megamol (1994)
- Ka Hector (1994)
- Nestor Solis, Hari ng Oxo (1995) - Nestor Solis
- Judge Maximiano Asuncion: Hukom Bitay (1995)
- Urban Rangers (1995)
- Maginoong Barumbado (1996)
- Medrano (1996)
- 'Wag Na 'Wag Kang Lalayo (1996) – Sonny
- Hawak Ko Buhay Mo (1996) – Matt
- Frame Up: Ihahatid Kita sa Hukay (1997) – Dennis
- Nasaan Ang Puso (1997) - Tiyo Carling
- Ang Babae sa Bintana (1998)
- Sambahin Ang Ngalan Mo (1998) - Samuel Mascardo
- Bilibid or Nut (1998)
- Isprikitik: Walastik Kung Pumitik (1999)
- Alyas Pogi: Ang Pagbabalik (1999) – Capt. Perez
- Tunay Na Tunay: Gets Mo? Gets Ko! (2000) - Don Julio
- Palaban (2000)
- Carta Alas: Huwag Ka Nang Humirit (2001) – Atty. Dax Imperial
- Bukas, Babaha ng Dugo (2001)
- Mano Po 2: My Home (2003)
- Anak ng Kumander (2008) - Mayor Isaac Albor
- Father Jejemon (2010)
- Badil (2013)
- Raketeros (2013)
- Muslim Magnum .357: To Serve and Protect (2014) - Faruq Ghazi
- Da Possessed (2014)
- Ang Bagong Dugo (2014)
- Kid Kulafu (2015) - Mang Ben
- Durugin ang Droga (2017)
- The Lookout (2018)
- Bato (The General Ronald dela Rosa Story) (2019) – Rodrigo Duterte

==== As writer ====
- Sa Iyo ang Itaas, sa Akin ang Ibaba ng Bahay (1997)
- Tatapatan Ko ang Lakas Mo (1999)
- Pasasabugin Ko ang Mundo Mo (2000)

==== As director ====
- Sa Iyo ang Itaas, sa Akin ang Ibaba ng Bahay (1997)
- Idol: The April Boy Regino Story (2024)

=== Television ===
- Lovingly Yours, Helen (1984-1996)
- Regal Shocker (1985 -1989, 1989-1990)
- John en Marsha (1987-1990) - Guest
- Okay Ka, Fairy Ko! (1987-1995) - Guest
- Palibhasa Lalake (1987-1998) - Guest
- Home Along Da Riles (1992-2003) - Guest
- Boracay (1993) - Guest
- Cebu (1993) - Guest
- GMA Telecine Specials (1993)
- Bisperas ng Kasaysayan (1994) – Krisanto
- Davao: Ang Gintong Pag Asa (1994) - Guest
- Tropang Trumpo (1995-1998) - Guest
- Coney Reyes on Camera (1995-1998) - Various
- Calvento Files (1997-1998) - Various
- Paraiso (1997-1998) - Various
- Mula sa Puso (1997-1999) - Ysmael Matias
- Bayani (1998) - Teodoro Asedillo
- Maynila (1999–2020) - Various
- Codename: Verano (2000) - Guest
- Bubble Gang (2000) - Various
- Tabing Ilog (1999–2003)
- Kasangga (2001) - Various
- Sa Puso Ko Iingatan Ka (2001) - Mr. Tordesillas
- Bituin (2002) - Angel
- Klassmeyts (2002-2003) - Guest
- Kaya ni Mister, Kaya ni Misis (2003) - Guest
- Home Along Da Airport (2003) - Guest
- Barya (2004) TV episode - Mark Bautista's Father
- Spirits (2004–2005) - Chief Jaylo
- Quizon Avenue (2005-2006) - Guest
- Goin' Bulilit (2005-2019) - Guest
- Baywalk Drama Special (2005-2010)
- Mga Anghel na Walang Langit (2005-2006)
- Margarita (2007) - Carding
- Love Spell (1 episode, 2007)
- Hairy Harry (2007)
- Magpakailanman (2008) - Various
- Codename: Asero (2008) - Guest
- May Bukas Pa (2009)
- Bulaklak (2009) - TV episode
- Dahil May Isang Ikaw - Guido (Ella's Kidnapping 2009)
- Maalaala Mo Kaya - Lina's Husband (2 episodes, 2009)
- Tayong Dalawa (2009) - Ka Doroy
- Tsinelas (2009) TV episode - Lina's Husband
- Claudine (2010)
- Spooky Nights (2011-2012) - Various
- Wagas (2012-2019) - Various
- Puntod (2013) TV episode - Merto
- It's Showtime (2012) - Guest/Judge
- Maalaala Mo Kaya (2013) - Merto
- Kailangan Ko'y Ikaw (2013) - Ernesto Cruz
- Little Champ (2013) - Mr. Salacay
- Tunay Na Buhay (2014) - Guest Himself Featured
- Imbestigador (2015) - Various
- Sabado Badoo (2015) - Cameo footage featured
- Tubig at Langis (2016) - Nestor Samaniego
- FPJ's Ang Probinsyano (2016) - Apollo Magat
- Ipaglaban Mo! (2017)
- Dear Uge (2017) - Various
- Los Bastardos (2018) - Alberto "Bert" Esperanza
- Wansapanataym (2018) Various
- Daig Kayo ng Lola Ko (2018) - Various
- Pepito Manaloto (2019) - Guest
- Banana Sundae (2019) - Guest
- A Soldier's Heart (2020)
- Bella Bandida (2021) - Tigro Ortaleza
- The Iron Heart (2023)
- FPJ's Batang Quiapo (2025) - Police Lt. Col. Salvador Romero
- Sigabo (2026) - Former PLTCOL Mariano Zafra

== Awards ==
Year	Work	Award	Category	Result	Source
1987	Gabi Na, Kumander	Best Supporting Actor	FAP Awards	Nominated	
1990	Tatak ng Isang Api	Best Supporting Actor	Gawad Urian Awards	Nominated	
1990	Delima Gang	Best Supporting Actor	FAMAS Awards	Nominated	
1991	Angel Molave	Supporting Actor of the Year	PMPC Star Awards for Movies	Nominated	
1991	Angel Molave	Best Supporting Actor	FAMAS Awards	Nominated	
1999	Ang Babae sa Bintana	Best Supporting Actor	Gawad Urian Awards	Nominated	
