= April Boys =

Filipino boy band

- Origin: Marikina, Metro Manila, Philippines
- Genres: P-pop, OPM, Pinoy Rock, novelty
- Years active: 1993–2004, 2020, 2023
- Labels: Ivory (1993–1994); Vicor Music Corporation (1995–2002); Prime Music Corporation (2002–2003); D' Concorde Recording Corporation (2003); Synergy Music Corporation (2004)
- Past members: April Boy Regino; Vingo Regino; Jimmy Regino

The April Boys were a Filipino musical group whose members are brothers Vingo and Jimmy Regino. Older brother April Boy Regino was also a member upon the group's formation in 1993. He appeared on their debut album before leaving to become a solo artist in 1995.

== History ==
After returning to the Philippines in 1993, April Boy Regino, together with his brothers Vingo and Jimmy, formed the musical group April Boys. Their debut song, "Sana'y Laging Magkapiling" from their debut album Dugong Pilipino became popular. However, in 1995, April Boy Regino left the group to pursue a solo career before signing to the label Ivory Records (now Ivory Music & Video). In a 2015 interview with Jessica Soho, he explained that the brothers competed amongst themselves which led to a falling out, but they later reconciled.

Vingo and Jimmy released their first album as a duo, the self-titled April Boys in 1995 containing the songs "Ikaw Pa Rin ang Mamahalin", "Sana ay Mahalin Mo Rin Ako" and "Tunay na Pag-Ibig" under Vicor Music, followed by the Christmas album, Tanging Hiling Sa Pasko.

In 1996, the duo were given a shot at acting, co-starring alongside Nida Blanca, Vina Morales, Donita Rose and Candy Pangilinan in the romantic film April Boys: Sana'y Mahalin Mo Rin Ako, produced by Viva Films. The duo's next album was Sana'y Tanggapin ang Pag-ibig Ko.

In 1997, they released the album Ganyan Talaga Ang... April Boys which contains the Tagalog/English cover version of the Southern All Stars song いとしのエリー("Itoshi no Ellie"), renamed "Honey My Love So Sweet".

In 2002, after departure of Vicor Music the duo released the same title and self-album Labs Kita under Prime Music Corporation (is a wholly owned subsidiaries of VIVA Entertainment) after one-year recording contract. Followed by next year in 2003 was another album of U2L Utol under D' Concorde Recording Corporation.

In 2004, the duo released their last self-titled album of Oo at Hindi if contained songs of "Oo at Hindi" "Pogi Naman Ako", "Nakilala Kong Pag-Ibig" and "Kahit Sana Sandali" was last released album under Synergy Music Corporation. The duo then disbanded and moved to the United States. April Boy Regino also migrated there a year later.

In 2020, the original three-member boy band reunited for the last time after 25 years for live concerts in San Diego, California on March 14 and in Las Vegas, Nevada on March 28.

April Boy Regino died on November 29, 2020, at the age of 59. He was diagnosed with chronic kidney disease and acute respiratory failure prior to his death.

In 2023, April Boy's son JC Regino alongside Vingo and Jimmy released a new song, "Idolo", which JC wrote as a way of giving thanks to his late dad's fans for the never-ending support they have shown. It was released as a single under GMA Music. After this next single of April Boy's son JC Regino with the duo's was another released the song of "Tama Na Sa 'Kin Ikaw" so which Vingo and Jimmy as a wrote of this song.

Jimmy Regino died on December 27, 2025.

== Members ==
- April Boy Regino - lead vocals (1993–1995, 2020; died 2020)
- Vingo Regino - lead vocals (1993–2004, 2020, 2023)
- Jimmy Regino - lead vocals (1993–2004, 2020, 2023; died 2025)

== Discography ==
=== Studio albums ===
- Dugong Pilipino (1993)
- April Boys (1995)
- Tanging Hiling Sa Pasko (1995)
- Sana'y Tanggapin ang Pag-ibig Ko (1996)
- Ganyan Talaga Ang... April Boys (1997)
- April Boys 5 (1998)
- Tayong Dalawa Pa Rin (1999)
- Labs Kita (2002)
- U2L Utol (2003)
- Oo at Hindi (2004)

=== Compilation albums ===
- Megahits (1999)
- Sana ay Magbalik (2006)

=== Songs ===
- "Sana'y Laging Makapiling" (1993)
- "Dugong Pilipino" (1993)
- "Giliw Ko" (1993)
- "Ikaw Pa Rin ang Mamahalin" (1995)
- "Pag-Ibig Kong Litong-Lito" (1995)
- "Sana ay Mahalin Mo Rin Ako" (1995)
- "Tunay na Pag-Ibig" (1995)
- "Tanging Hiling sa Pasko" (1995)
- "Nalilimutan Na ang Pasko" (1995)
- "May Hirap, May Sarap sa Pasko" (1995)
- "Merry Christmas Sa'yo Lab Ko" (1995)
- "Di Kita Ma-Reach" (1996)
- "Sana'y Tanggapin ang Pag-Ibig (1996)
- "Pag-Ibig Mo, Langit Ko" (1996)
- "Ganyan Talaga ang Pag-Ibig" (1997)
- "Honey My Love (So Sweet)" (1997) (cover of "Itoshi no Ellie" by the Southern All Stars)
- "Nakapagtataka" (1998)
- "Paalam Na Sayo" (1998)
- "Parang 'Di Ko Na Kaya" (1998)
- "Panalangin Ko Sana (Umulan na Malakas) (1998)
- "April Boys Mega Medley/Tunay na Pag-Ibig (Mega Medley)" (1999)
- "Tayong Dalawa Pa Rin" (1999)
- "Mapagmahal Ako" (1999)
- "Sana ay Magbalik" (1999) (cover of "Come What May" by Air Supply)
- "Paulit-Ulit" (1999)
- "Pag-Ibig ang Gamot" (1999)
- "Naaalala Ka" (1999)
- "Sayo Lang Na-In Lab" (1999)
- "Labs Kita" (2002)
- "Sweetheart Lab na Lab Kita" (2002)
- "Baby I'm Sorry" (2002)
- "Kahit Mahirap Lang" (2003)
- "Nagmamahal na Tapat" (2003)
- "DJ na Aking Radyo" (2003)
- "Pa-Promise Promise" (2003)
- "Oo at Hindi" (2004)
- "Kahit Sana Sandali" (2004)
- "Pogi Naman Ako" (2004)
- "Mahal Mo Pala Ako" (2004)
- "Nakilala Kong Pag-Ibig" (2004)
- "Marami" (2004)
- "Idolo" (with JC Regino) (2023)
- "Sana'y Magustuhan Mo Rin Ako" (2023)
- "Kahit na Malayo Ka" (2023)
- "Si Hesus ang Katuparan" (2023)
- "Mahal Pala Kita" (2023)
- "Bumalik Ka Na" (2023)
- "Umaasa" (2023)
- "Sana" (2023)
- "Katuparan" (2023)
- "Sa Piling Mo" (2023)
- "Orasan" (2023)
- "Alam Mo Ba" (2023)
- "Isang Taong Pag-Ibig" (2023)
- "Tama Na Sa 'Kin Ikaw" (with JC Regino) (2023)
