= The Gatekeeper (film) =

2024 film directed by Matthew & Dean Rosen

- Official release poster
- Directed by: Matthew Rosen; Dean Rosen
- Screenplay by: Dean Rosen; Zoe Alcazaren
- Starring: Shanaia Gomez
- Cinematography: Matthew Rosen
- Edited by: Rommel Malimban
- Music by: Dean Rosen
- Production companies: Kinetek; iWantTFC
- Distributed by: iWantTFC
- Release date: October 19, 2024
- Running time: 97 minutes
- Country: Philippines
- Languages: Filipino; English

The Gatekeeper is a 2024 Philippine supernatural mystery folk horror film directed by Matthew and Dean Rosen from the screenplay of Dean Rosen and Zoe Alcazaren. Shanaia Gomez plays Cita, the actress's first lead role. The film is about a woman discovering a strange cabinet that also serves as a portal to underworld.

== Premise ==
Struggling with the effects of extreme trauma, an antiques dealer happens to fall upon an interesting piece; a cabinet that has been owned by a priest who died under unusual circumstances.

== Cast ==
- Shanaia Gomez as Cita
- Dean Rosen as Rabbi Jacob
- Jef Flores as Zachary
- Miguel Vasquez as Edwin Flores
- Nor Domingo
- Jamie Wilson
- Ina Bolivar
- Kate Alejandrino

== Production ==
The project has been in the works for decades according to director Matthew Rosen which started since 1984 when he started to do research on biblical mysteries in Filipino folklore which created The Gatekeeper. Rosen quoted in the press conference: "I've been working on it since 1984 ... it actually takes a lot of research, there's a lot of stuff to get your head around all the way through it." He also stated that he had to research because it is not commonly known. The film will have demonic mysteries lurking in the real world while blending biblical elements into Filipino folklore.

== Release ==
The film was premiered in manila at Dolphy Theater on October 17, 2024. The film released in iWantTFC on October 19, 2024.

== Marketing and release ==
On September 11, 2024, both the trailer and the official moving poster was revealed during the press conference and then released online an hour after.

The film was made available on iWantTFC in October 20244., with a premiere screening in Manila at Dolphy Theater on October 17, 2024.

== Reception ==
Goldwin Reviews stated that the script had potential but lacked the execution calling it lame and boring.

The movie received a score of 33/100 from 6 reviews according to review aggregator website Kritikultura, indicating negative reviews.
