= Huwag Mo 'Kong Iwan =

2024 Philippine romantic drama film directed by Joel Lamangan

- Theatrical release poster
- Directed by: Joel Lamangan
- Screenplay by: Eric Ramos
- Produced by: Dennis Evangelista; Benjamin Austria
- Starring: Rhian Ramos; JC de Vera; Tom Rodriguez
- Cinematography: T.M. Malones
- Edited by: John Anthony Wong
- Music by: Von De Guzman
- Production company: BenTria Productions
- Release date: November 27, 2024
- Running time: 110 minutes
- Country: Philippines
- Language: Filipino

Huwag Mo 'Kong Iwan (lit. 'Don't Leave Me') is a 2024 Philippine romantic drama film directed by Joel Lamangan and by the screenplay of Eric Ramos. It stars Rhian Ramos, JC de Vera and Tom Rodriguez. This is a comeback film of Tom Rodriguez after a two years break from acting. The title and the soundtrack of the film is based on Ogie Alcasid's 2022 single "Huwag Mo Kong Iwan" performed by JC De Vera.

== Synopsis ==
Two ex-lovers who reunited, only to find themselves separated again when one of them gets embroiled in human trafficking and illegal drug trade.

== Cast ==
- Rhian Ramos as Lara: A dreamer from the province who unfortunately lands in jail in Manila after a series of unfortunate events. Aside from what she faces, her heart is torn between her childhood sweetheart and fiancé Joseph.
- JC de Vera as Joseph: A musician who left behind his band’s overseas posting to marry Lara.
- Tom Rodriguez as Edwin: Lara's lovestruck lawyer.
- Rita Avila as Esther
- Pinky Amador as Mrs. Lao
- Emilio Garcia as Mr. Lao
- Nella Dizon
- Jim Pebanco as Pilo
- Lloyd Samartino as Mr. Torrecampo
- Simon Ibarra as Luis
- Tanya Gomez as Mrs. Torrecampo
- Marcus Madrigal
- Felixia Crysten as Doray
- Ricci Jereza-Chan
- King David Arce as Badong
- Panteen Palanca
- Mygz Molino

== Release ==
The film is originally planned to release in 50th Metro Manila Film Festival but failed to make it in the final list.

The film was released nationwide on November 27, 2024, under BenTria Productions. It was released in the Philippines alongside Moana 2 and Idol: The April Boy Regino Story.

== Accolades ==
Accolades received by Huwag Mo 'Kong Iwan
Award	Date of ceremony	Category	Recipient(s)	Result	Ref.
41st PMPC Star Awards for Movies	November 30, 2025	Indie Movie of the Year	Huwag Mo 'Kong Iwan	Nominated	
41st PMPC Star Awards for Movies	November 30, 2025	Indie Movie Director of the Year	Joel Lamangan	Nominated	
41st PMPC Star Awards for Movies	November 30, 2025	Indie Movie Screenwriter of the Year	Eric Ramos	Nominated	
41st PMPC Star Awards for Movies	November 30, 2025	Indie Movie Musical Scorer of the Year	Von De Guzman	Nominated	
41st PMPC Star Awards for Movies	November 30, 2025	Indie Movie Sound Engineer of the Year	Paolo Estero	Nominated	
