= Gawad Urian for Best Supporting Actress =

Annual Philippine film award

Gawad Urian Award for Best Supporting Actress
- Awarded for: Best Performance by an Actress in a Supporting Role; Pinakamahusay na Pangalawang Aktres
- Country: Philippines
- Presented by: Filipino Film Critics; Manunuri ng Pelikulang Pilipino
- First award: 1977
- Currently held by: Kakki Teodoro; Isang Himala (2025)

Highlights
- Most wins: Amy Austria, Charito Solis, Elizabeth Oropesa, Gina Alajar & Jaclyn Jose (2)
- Most nominations: Liza Lorena (8)
- Website: https://manunuripelikula.com/

The Gawad Urian for Best Supporting Actress (officially, Pinakamahusay na Pangalawang Aktres) is a movie award given by the Filipino Film Critics (Manunuri ng Pelikulang Pilipino or MPP) to actresses for their supporting roles in movies partially or wholly created by Filipinos.

Founded on 1 May 1976, the MPP is a group of cinema critics, writers and scholars who seek to bestow special recognition for the best movies of the Philippines. The inaugural Gawad Urian for Best Supporting Actress is shared by Mitch Valdez and Yvonne. Veteran actress Liza Lorena holds the record for the most nominations in this category with eight.

Kakki Teodoro currently holds this award for her role in Isang Himala.

== Winners and nominees ==
The winner is shown first, followed by the other nominees.

=== 1970s ===
Year	Actor	Film	Role
1977 (1st)
1977 (1st)	Mitch Valdez	Lunes, Martes, Miyerkules, Huwebes, Biyernes, Sabado, Linggo	
1977 (1st)	Yvonne	Ligaw na Bulaklak	
1977 (1st)	Laurice Guillen	Lunes, Martes, Miyerkules, Huwebes, Biyernes, Sabado, Linggo	
1977 (1st)	Marissa Delgado	Ligaw na Bulaklak	
1977 (1st)	Moody Diaz	Itim	Aling Bebeng
1978 (2nd)
1978 (2nd)	Armida Siguion-Reyna	Tahan na Empoy, Tahan	
1978 (2nd)	Chanda Romero	Inay	Daisy
1978 (2nd)	Daria Ramirez	Hubad na Bayani	
1978 (2nd)	Laurice Guillen	Inay	
1978 (2nd)	Rosemarie Gil	Burlesk Queen	Virgie Nite
1979 (3rd)
1979 (3rd)	Chanda Romero	Boy Pena	
1979 (3rd)	Adul de Leon	Pagputi ng Uwak... Pag-itim ng Tagak	Beatrice Monserrat
1979 (3rd)	Beth Bautista	Mga Tinik ng Babae	
1979 (3rd)	Josephine Garcia	Hindi sa Iyo ang Mundo, Baby Porcuna	Emma
1979 (3rd)	Suzanne Gonzales	Hindi sa Iyo ang Mundo, Baby Porcuna	Susan

=== 1980s ===
Year	Actor	Film	Role
1980 (4th)
1980 (4th)	Amy Austria	Jaguar	Cristy Montes
1980 (4th)	Anita Linda	Jaguar	Mother
1980 (4th)	Chanda Romero	Ikaw at Ang Gabi	
1980 (4th)	Rita Gomez	Salawahan	Marianne David
1980 (4th)	Sandy Andolong	Menor de Edad	Rich Young Woman
1981 (5th)
1981 (5th)	Daria Ramirez	Aguila	Elvira
1981 (5th)	Armida Siguion-Reyna	Kakabakaba Ka Ba?	Ching Chao Kee alias Madame Lily
1981 (5th)	Chanda Romero	Kasal?	Lani
1981 (5th)	Mia Gutierrez	Kasal?	Ellen
1981 (5th)	Nanette Inventor	Kakabakaba Ka Ba?	Sonia Dela Cruz
1982 (6th)
1982 (6th)	Charito Solis	Kisapmata	Dely Carandang
1982 (6th)	Alicia Alonzo	Playgirl	Luisa
1982 (6th)	Amy Austria	Ako ang Hari	
1982 (6th)	Gina Alajar	Ako ang Hari	
1982 (6th)	Perla Bautista	Kumander Alibasbas	
1983 (7th)
1983 (7th)	Baby Delgado	Cain at Abel	Becky
1983 (7th)	Ama Quiambao	Himala	Sepa
1983 (7th)	Dexter Doria	Moral	
1983 (7th)	Gigi Dueñas	Himala	Nimia
1983 (7th)	Laurice Guillen	Moral	Maggie
1983 (7th)	Liza Lorena	Oro, Plata, Mata	Nena Ojeda
1983 (7th)	Mitch Valdez	Oro, Plata, Mata	Jo Russell
1983 (7th)	Mona Lisa	Cain at Abel	Pina
1984 (8th)
1984 (8th)	Charito Solis	Karnal	Storyteller
1984 (8th)	Grace Amilbangsa	Karnal	Doray
1984 (8th)	Liza Lorena	Don't Cry for Me, Papa	Aida
1985 (9th)
1985 (9th)	Laurice Guillen	Sister Stella L.	Sister Stella Bautista
1985 (9th)	Celia Rodriguez	Bulaklak sa City Jail	Luna
1985 (9th)	Gina Alajar	Sister Stella L.	Gigi
1985 (9th)	Liza Lorena	Sister Stella L.	Magazine Editor
1985 (9th)	Perla Bautista	Bulaklak sa City Jail	Viring
1986 (10th)
1986 (10th)	Liza Lorena	Miguelito	Ningning
1986 (10th)	Amy Austria	Hinugot sa Langit	Stella
1986 (10th)	Caridad Sanchez	Ano ang Kulay ng Mukha ng Diyos?	Aling Celing
1986 (10th)	Charito Solis	Hinugot sa Langit	Juling
1986 (10th)	Mona Lisa	Bayan Ko	Ina ni Turing
1987 (11th)
1987 (11th)	Anita Linda	Takaw Tukso	
1987 (11th)	Nida Blanca	Magdusa Ka!	Aling Toyang
1987 (11th)	Betty Mae Piccio	Unfaithful Wife	Rosa
1987 (11th)	Carmi Martin	Bagong Hari	
1987 (11th)	Perla Bautista	Bagong Hari	
1987 (11th)	Yvonne	Private Show	
1988
1988	The MPP decides not to give out any awards this year.		
1989 (12th)
1989 (12th)	Perla Bautista	Anak ng Cabron	Julio's mother
1989 (12th)	Anita Linda	Itanong Mo sa Buwan	Juana
1989 (12th)	Caridad Sanchez	Kapag Napagod ang Puso	
1989 (12th)	Jaclyn Jose	Misis Mo, Misis Ko	Vida
1989 (12th)	Mary Walter	Boy Negro	Grandmother

=== 1990s ===
Year	Actor	Film	Role
1990 (13th)
1990 (13th)	Jaclyn Jose	Macho Dancer	Bambi
1990 (13th)	Isadora Alonzo	Ang Pumatay ng Dahil sa Iyo	Angela
1990 (13th)	Maila Gumila	Joe Pring: Homicide Manila Police	
1990 (13th)	Maria Isabel Lopez	Sa Kuko ng Agila	Shirley
1990 (13th)	Pilar Pilapil	Kailan Mahuhugasan ang Kasalanan?	Beatriz Escudero
1990 (13th)	Vicky Suba	Pahiram ng Isang Umaga	Irene
1991 (14th)
1991 (14th)	Gina Alajar	Biktima	Laura Malicat
1991 (14th)	Ali Sotto	My Other Woman	
1991 (14th)	Carmina Villarroel	Kapag Langit ang Humatol	Bernadette
1991 (14th)	Charo Santos	Gumapang Ka sa Lusak	Rowena Guatlo
1991 (14th)	Dawn Zulueta	Kasalanan Bang Sambahin Kita?	Grace Lozano
1991 (14th)	Kristine Garcia	Kapag Langit ang Humatol	Carol
1992 (15th)
1992 (15th)	Nanette Medved	Sa Kabila ng Lahat	Lala Villarica
1992 (15th)	Armida Siguion-Reyna	Ang Totoong Buhay ni Pacita M.	Mrs. Estrella
1992 (15th)	Gina Alajar	Shake Rattle & Roll III	Rowena
1992 (15th)	Jackie Lou Blanco	Hihintayin Kita sa Langit	Sandra
1992 (15th)	Mona Lisa	Huwag Mong Salingin ang Sugat Ko	Mrs. Regala
1993 (16th)
1993 (16th)	Amy Austria	Narito ang Puso Ko	Dolly Sanchez
1993 (16th)	Cherie Gil	Ngayon at Kailanman	Donna Benitez
1993 (16th)	Connie Chua	Bayani	
1993 (16th)	Maricel Laxa	Iisa Pa Lamang	Betina
1993 (16th)	Nanette Medved	Narito ang Puso Ko	Suzette
1994 (17th)
1994 (17th)	Sharmaine Arnaiz	Saan Ka Man Naroroon	Cita
1994 (17th)	Amy Austria	Kung Mawawala Ka Pa	Sylvia
1994 (17th)	Cherry Pie Picache	Makati Ave. (Office Girls)	
1994 (17th)	Vina Morales	Hanggang Saan, Hanggang Kailan	Jocelyn
1995 (18th)
1995 (18th)	Chin Chin Gutierrez	Maalaala Mo Kaya: The Movie	Marissa
1995 (18th)	Caridad Sanchez	Maalaala Mo Kaya: The Movie	Nena
1995 (18th)	Cherie Gil	Wating	Anya
1995 (18th)	Gina Pareño	The Fatima Buen Story	Frank
1995 (18th)	Janice de Belen	The Fatima Buen Story	Batman
1995 (18th)	Maricel Laxa	Hindi Magbabago	Ricky
1996 (19th)
1996 (19th)	Jaclyn Jose	The Flor Contemplacion Story	Neneng
1996 (19th)	Alma Concepcion	Sa Ngalan ng Pag-ibig	Donna
1996 (19th)	Amy Austria	Nena	Sylvia
1996 (19th)	Elizabeth Oropesa	Ipaglaban Mo: The Movie	Feliza
1996 (19th)	Jennifer Sevilla	Muling Umawit ang Puso	Karla
1996 (19th)	Rita Avila	The Flor Contemplacion Story	Evangeline Parale / Virginia Parumog
1997 (20th)
1997 (20th)	Gina Alajar	Mulanay: Sa Pusod ng Paraiso	Norma
1997 (20th)	Cherry Pie Picache	Abot Kamay ang Pangarap	Amay
1997 (20th)	Dawn Zulueta	Bakit May Kahapon Pa?	Leah
1997 (20th)	Gina Pareño	May Nagmamahal sa Iyo	Rosing
1997 (20th)	Jaclyn Jose	May Nagmamahal sa Iyo	Editha Sungcalan
1998 (21st)
1998 (21st)	Elizabeth Oropesa	Milagros	Miding
1998 (21st)	Maricel Laxa	Minsan Lang Magmamahal	Sandra
1998 (21st)	Amanda Page	Rizal sa Dapitan	Josephine Bracken
1998 (21st)	Daria Ramirez	Damong Ligaw	Nanang
1998 (21st)	Dindi Gallardo	Nang Iniwan Mo Ako	Olive
1998 (21st)	Eva Darren	Ligaya ang Itawag Mo sa Akin	Gunda
1998 (21st)	Mia Gutierrez	Milagros	Arlene
1999 (22nd)
1999 (22nd)	Serena Dalrymple	Bata, Bata... Paano Ka Ginawa?	Maya
1999 (22nd)	Angel Aquino	Sana Pag-ibig Na	Karen
1999 (22nd)	Anita Linda	Babae sa Bubungang Lata	Amapola
1999 (22nd)	Chin Chin Gutierrez	Sa Pusod ng Dagat	Mrs. Santiago
1999 (22nd)	Jaclyn Jose	Curacha, Ang Babaeng Walang Pahinga	Myrna
1999 (22nd)	Pinky Amador	Sana Pag-ibig Na	Marie Perez
1999 (22nd)	Vangie Labalan	Sana Pag-ibig Na	Tinang

=== 2000s ===
Year	Actor	Film	Role
2000 (23rd)
2000 (23rd)	Glydel Mercado	Sidhi	Mayang
2000 (23rd)	Ana Capri	Sa Paraiso ni Efren	Ana
2000 (23rd)	Caridad Sanchez	Sidhi	Tia Manuella
2000 (23rd)	Cherry Pie Picache	Burlesk King	Aileen
2000 (23rd)	Elizabeth Oropesa	Burlesk King	Betty
2000 (23rd)	Estrella Kuenzler	Pila-Balde	Lola Cion
2000 (23rd)	Jennifer Sevilla	Kahapon, May Dalawang Bata	Daling
2000 (23rd)	Madeleine Nicolas	Luksong Tinik	Ms. Garcia
2000 (23rd)	Ynez Veneracion	Sa Paraiso ni Efren	Magda
2001 (24th)
2001 (24th)	Monique Wilson	Laro sa Baga	Emy
2001 (24th)	Angel Aquino	Laro sa Baga	Carmen
2001 (24th)	Cherie Gil	Sugatang Puso	Miriam
2001 (24th)	Dina Bonnevie	Tanging Yaman	Grace
2001 (24th)	Hilda Koronel	Tanging Yaman	Celine
2001 (24th)	Jaclyn Jose	Tuhog	Violeta
2001 (24th)	Janet McBride	Tanging Yaman	Madeleine
2002 (25th)
2002 (25th)	Gloria Diaz	Batang West Side	Lolita Fordham
2002 (25th)	Alessandra de Rossi	Hubog	Nikka
2002 (25th)	Hazel Espinosa	Live Show	Sandra
2002 (25th)	Klaudia Koronel	Live Show	Gigi
2002 (25th)	Liza Lorena	La Vida Rosa	Lola Azen
2002 (25th)	Priscilla Almeda	Batang West Side	Dolores
2003 (26th)
2003 (26th)	Elizabeth Oropesa	Laman	Nipsie
2003 (26th)	Amy Austria	Mano Po	Linda Go
2003 (26th)	Dexter Doria	Mga Munting Tinig	Mrs. Pantalan
2003 (26th)	Judy Ann Santos	Magkapatid	Lisa
2003 (26th)	Kris Aquino	Mano Po	Juliet Go-Co
2003 (26th)	Madeleine Nicolas	Masikip Mainit… Paraisong Parisukat	Belen
2003 (26th)	Raquel Villavicencio	Prosti	Nanay Xedes
2004 (27th)
2004 (27th)	Gloria Romero	Magnifico	Lola Magda
2004 (27th)	Celia Rodriguez	Magnifico	Ka Doring
2004 (27th)	Girlie Sevilla	Magnifico	Isang
2004 (27th)	Hilda Koronel	Crying Ladies	Rhoda "Aling Doray" Rivera
2004 (27th)	Isabelle de Leon	Magnifico	Helen
2004 (27th)	Lorna Tolentino	Magnifico	Edna
2004 (27th)	Mickey Ferriols	Kung Ako na Lang Sana	Elaine
2004 (27th)	Sherry Lara	Crying Ladies	Mrs. Chua
2005 (28th)
2005 (28th)	Iza Calzado	Sigaw	Anna
2005 (28th)	Aleck Bovick	Naglalayag	Rica
2005 (28th)	Angie Ferro	Ebolusyon ng Isang Pamilyang Pilipino	Puring
2005 (28th)	Ara Mina	Minsan Pa	Luna
2005 (28th)	Juliana Palermo	Panaghoy sa Suba	Iset
2005 (28th)	Rebecca Lusterio	Panaghoy sa Suba	Bikay
2006 (29th)
2006 (29th)	Hilda Koronel	Nasaan Ka Man	Trining
2006 (29th)	Boots Anson-Roa	Blue Moon	Cora
2006 (29th)	Gloria Diaz	Nasaan Ka Man	Lilla
2006 (29th)	Hallen Sumingwa	Ang Daan Patungong Kalimugtong	
2006 (29th)	Jennylyn Mercado	Blue Moon	Young Cora
2006 (29th)	Joy Soler-de Castro	Pepot Artista	Madam Hulasky
2007 (30th)
2007 (30th)	Meryll Soriano	Rotonda	Bar dancer
2007 (30th)	Agot Isidro	Tulad ng Dati	Beth Pangan
2007 (30th)	Gina Pareño	Kasal, Kasali, Kasalo	Belita
2007 (30th)	Gloria Diaz	Kasal, Kasali, Kasalo	Charito
2007 (30th)	Liza Lorena	Inang Yaya	Lola Toots
2007 (30th)	Pops Fernandez	ZsaZsa Zaturnnah Ze Moveeh	Queen Feminah Suarestellar Baroux
2007 (30th)	Tala Santos	Inang Yaya	Ruby
2007 (30th)	Tessie Tomas	Rome & Juliet	Charo
2008 (31st)
2008 (31st)	Angela Ruiz	Tirador	Tess
2008 (31st)	Anita Linda	Tambolista	Lola Trining
2008 (31st)	Ara Mina	Selda	Sita
2008 (31st)	Eugene Domingo	Foster Child	Bianca
2008 (31st)	Liza Lorena	Katas ng Saudi	Noemi
2008 (31st)	Malou Crisologo	Tribu	Mameng
2009 (32nd)
2009 (32nd)	Aleera Montalla	Yanggaw	Amor Villacin
2009 (32nd)	Agot Isidro	Huling Pasada	
2009 (32nd)	Flor Salanga	Jay	Luzviminda Mercado
2009 (32nd)	Katherine Luna	Imoral	Abi
2009 (32nd)	Tessie Tomas	100	Eloisa
2009 (32nd)	Tetchie Agbayani	Yanggaw	Inday Villacin

=== 2010s ===
Year	Actor	Film	Role
2010 (33rd)
2010 (33rd)	Sue Prado	Himpapawid	Diana
2010 (33rd)	Dimples Romana	In My Life	Dang
2010 (33rd)	Gina Alajar	Dukot	
2010 (33rd)	Gina Pareño	Bakal Boys	Lola Salvia
2010 (33rd)	Glaiza de Castro	Astig	Elgine
2010 (33rd)	Jea Lyka Cinco	Hospital Boat	Lensha
2010 (33rd)	Maria Isabel Lopez	Kinatay	Madonna
2010 (33rd)	Miriam Quiambao	Kimmy Dora: Kambal sa Kiyeme	Gertrude
2011 (34th)
2011 (34th)	Rosanna Roces	Presa	
2011 (34th)	Anita Linda	Presa	
2011 (34th)	Liza Lorena	Presa	
2011 (34th)	Lucia Jeuzan	Ang Damgo ni Eleuteria	Nanay
2011 (34th)	Maria Isabel Lopez	Halaw	
2011 (34th)	Rio Locsin	Amigo	Corazon
2011 (34th)	Zsa Zsa Padilla	Sigwa	Sita
2012 (35th)
2012 (35th)	Jean Garcia	Ang Sayaw ng Dalawang Kaliwang Paa	Karen
2012 (35th)	Angeli Bayani	Ka Oryang	Alma
2012 (35th)	Julia Clarete	Bisperas	
2012 (35th)	Shamaine Buencamino	Niño	
2012 (35th)	Solenn Heussaff	Yesterday, Today, Tomorrow	Selene
2013 (36th)
2013 (36th)	Alessandra de Rossi	Sta. Niña	Madeleine
2013 (36th)	Alessandra de Rossi	Mater Dolorosa	Fatima Lagrimas
2013 (36th)	Annicka Dolonius	Ang Nawawala	Enid del Mundo
2013 (36th)	Clara Ramona	In Nomine Matris	
2013 (36th)	Joy Viado	MNL 143	Mila
2013 (36th)	Mylene Dizon	Aparisyon	Sister Remy
2013 (36th)	Raquel Villavicencio	Aparisyon	Sister Vera
2014 (37th)
2014 (37th)	Angel Aquino	Ang Huling Cha-Cha ni Anita	Pilar
2014 (37th)	Angel Aquino	Porno	Alessandra
2014 (37th)	Jasmine Curtis-Smith	Transit	Yael
2014 (37th)	Michelle Smith	Angustia	
2014 (37th)	Raquel Villavicencio	Dukit	
2014 (37th)	Ruby Ruiz	Ekstra	Josie
2015 (38th)
2015 (38th)	Gladys Reyes	Magkakabaung	Mabel
2015 (38th)	Alessandra de Rossi	Mauban: Ang Resiko	Lota
2015 (38th)	Barbie Forteza	Mariquina	Imelda
2015 (38th)	Gloria Sevilla	M. (Mother's Maiden Name)	
2015 (38th)	Iza Calzado	Barber's Tales	Cecilia
2015 (38th)	Karenina Haniel	Mula sa Kung Ano ang Noon	Joselina
2015 (38th)	Shamaine Buencamino	Barber's Tales	Tess
2016 (39th)
2016 (39th)	Ana Abad Santos	Apocalypse Child	Chona
2016 (39th)	Cecile Yumul	Ari: My Life with a King	Miding
2016 (39th)	Gwen Zamora	Apocalypse Child	Serena
2016 (39th)	Liza Diño	Toto	Eve Porter
2016 (39th)	Mylene Dizon	Heneral Luna	Isabel
2016 (39th)	Rio Locsin	Iisa	Sister Jo
2016 (39th)	Tessie Tomas	Water Lemon	Pina
2017 (40th)
2017 (40th)	Sharifa Pearlsia Ali-Dans	Women of the Weeping River	Farida
2017 (40th)	Anna Luna	Paglipay	
2017 (40th)	Barbie Forteza	Tuos	Dowokan
2017 (40th)	Janine Gutierrez	Dagsin	Young Corazon
2017 (40th)	Joan dela Cruz	Paglipay	
2017 (40th)	Lotlot de Leon	Mrs.	Delia
2017 (40th)	Lui Manansala	Ned's Project	Max
2017 (40th)	Mariam Zimadar Caranay-Raper	Women of the Weeping River	Shadiya
2017 (40th)	Meryll Soriano	Pauwi Na	Isabel
2017 (40th)	Rhed Bustamante	Seklusyon	Anghela Sta. Ana
2018 (41st)
2018 (41st)	Odette Khan	Bar Boys	Justice Hernandez
2018 (41st)	Angeli Bayani	Maestra	Gennie Panguelo
2018 (41st)	Chai Fonacier	Respeto	Betchai
2018 (41st)	Gloria Sevilla	Maestra	Espie Bautista
2018 (41st)	Jasmine Curtis-Smith	Siargao	Abi
2018 (41st)	Menchu Lauchengco-Yulo	Ang Larawan	Pepang
2018 (41st)	Nathalie Hart	Historiographika Errata	Librada
2018 (41st)	Shamaine Buencamino	Paki	Mercedes
2018 (41st)	Yayo Aguila	Kiko Boksingero	Diday
2019 (42nd)
2019 (42nd)	Cherie Gil	Citizen Jake	Patricia Medina
2019 (42nd)	Bituin Escalante	Ang Panahon ng Halimaw	Kwentista
2019 (42nd)	Daria Ramirez	Signal Rock	Alicia Abakan
2019 (42nd)	Nova Villa	Miss Granny	Fely
2019 (42nd)	Pinky Amador	Ang Panahon ng Halimaw	Kwago

=== 2020s ===
Year	Actor	Film	Role
2020 (43rd)
2020 (43rd)	Yayo Aguila	Metamorphosis	Elena
2020 (43rd)	Angie Castrence	Iska	Bining
2020 (43rd)	Cherie Gil	Kaputol	Kiki / Rina
2020 (43rd)	Maricel Laxa	Hello, Love, Goodbye	Lita
2020 (43rd)	Meryll Soriano	John Denver Trending	Marites Cabungcal
2020 (43rd)	Perla Bautista	Ulan	Maya's grandmother
2020 (43rd)	Pinky Amador	Ang Hupa	
2021 (44th)
2021 (44th)	Dexter Doria	Memories of Forgetting	Yvonne
2021 (44th)	Hazel Orencio	Lahi, Hayop	Mariposa
2021 (44th)	Bing Pimentel	Midnight in a Perfect World	Alma
2021 (44th)	Lolita Carbon	Lahi, Hayop	Aling Mamay
2021 (44th)	Sandy Andolong	Finding Agnes	Agnes Rivero
2022 (45th)
2022 (45th)	Lotlot de Leon	On the Job: The Missing 8	Weng
2022 (45th)	Dolly de Leon	Historya ni Ha	Dahlia
2022 (45th)	Eugene Domingo	Big Night!	Madam
2022 (45th)	Jay Valencia Glorioso	Rabid	Lola
2022 (45th)	Mae Paner	Historya ni Ha	Sister
2022 (45th)	Shella Mae Romualdo	Arisaka	Nawi
2023 (46th)
2023 (46th)	Claudia Enriquez	12 Weeks	Lorna
2023 (46th)	Bing Pimentel	12 Weeks	Grace
2023 (46th)	Nikki Valdez	Family Matters	Ellen
2023 (46th)	Shamaine Buencamino	Kapag Wala nang Mga Alon	Nerissa
2024 (47th)
2024 (47th)	Dolly de Leon	Ang Duyan ng Magiting	Jill Sebastian
2024 (47th)	Agot Isidro	Ang Duyan ng Magiting	Helen Santos
2024 (47th)	Alessandra de Rossi	Firefly	Elay
2024 (47th)	Frances Ignacio	Ang Duyan ng Magiting	Cora Ventura
2024 (47th)	Jorrybell Agoto	When This Is All Over	
2025 (48th)
2025 (48th)	Kakki Teodoro	Isang Himala	Nimia
2025 (48th)	Bituin Escalante	Isang Himala	Aling Saling
2025 (48th)	Chanda Romero	Espantaho	Adele
2025 (48th)	Ina Feleo	The Hearing	
2025 (48th)	Kei Kurosawa	Crosspoint	Mayuko Yamaguchi
2025 (48th)	Rowena Sangher	Tumandok	

== Multiple wins and nominations ==
The following individuals have won two or more Gawad Urian Awards for Best Supporting Actress:

Wins	Actor	Nominations	First Win	Latest Win
2	Amy Austria	7	Jaguar (1980)	Narito ang Puso Ko (1993)
2	Charito Solis	3	Kisapmata (1982)	Karnal (1984)
2	Elizabeth Oropesa	4	Milagros (1998)	Laman (2003)
2	Gina Alajar	6	Biktima (1991)	Mulanay: Sa Pusod ng Paraiso (1997)
2	Jaclyn Jose	6	Macho Dancer (1990)	The Flor Contemplacion Story (1996)

The following individuals have received four or more Best Supporting Actress nominations:

Nominations	Actor	First Nomination	Latest Nomination
8	Liza Lorena	Oro, Plata, Mata (1983)	Presa (2011)
7	Amy Austria	Jaguar (1980)	Mano Po (2003)
6	Anita Linda	Jaguar (1980)	Presa (2011)
6	Gina Alajar	Ako ang Hari (1982)	Dukot (2010)
6	Jaclyn Jose	Misis Mo, Misis Ko (1989)	Tuhog (2001)
5	Alessandra de Rossi	Hubog (2002)	Firefly (2024)
5	Chanda Romero	Inay (1978)	Espantaho (2025)
5	Cherie Gil	Ngayon at Kailanman (1993)	Kaputol (2020)
5	Perla Bautista	Kumander Alibasbas (1982)	Ulan (2020)
4	Angel Aquino	Sana Pag-Ibig Na (1999)	Ang Huling Cha-Cha ni Anita & Porno (2014)
4	Caridad Sanchez	Ano ang Kulay ng Mukha ng Diyos? (1986)	Sidhi (2000)
4	Daria Ramirez	Hubad na Bayani (1978)	Signal Rock (2019)
4	Elizabeth Oropesa	Ipaglaban Mo: The Movie (1996)	Laman (2003)
4	Gina Pareño	The Fatima Buen Story (1995)	Bakal Boys (2010)
4	Laurice Guillen	Lunes, Martes, Miyerkules, Huwebes, Biyernes, Sabado, Linggo (1977)	Sister Stella L. (1985)
4	Maricel Laxa	Iisa Pa Lamang (1993)	Hello, Love, Goodbye (2020)
4	Shamaine Buencamino	Niño (2012)	Kapag Wala nang Mga Alon (2023)
