= Gawad Urian for Best Supporting Actor =

Annual Philippine film award

Gawad Urian Award for Best Supporting Actor
- Awarded for: Best Performance by an Actor in a Supporting Role; Pinakamahusay na Pangalawang Aktor
- Country: Philippines
- Presented by: Filipino Film Critics; Manunuri ng Pelikulang Pilipino
- First award: 1977
- Currently held by: Felipe Ganancial; Tumandok (2025)

Highlights
- Most wins: Albert Martinez, Art Acuña & Soliman Cruz (2)
- Most nominations: John Arcilla (7)
- Website: https://manunuripelikula.com/

The Gawad Urian for Best Supporting Actor (officially, Pinakamahusay na Pangalawang Aktor) is a movie award given by the Filipino Film Critics (Manunuri ng Pelikulang Pilipino or MPP) to actors for their supporting roles in movies partially or wholly created by Filipinos.

Founded on May 1, 1976, the MPP is a group of cinema critics, writers and scholars who seek to bestow special recognition for the best movies of the Philippines. The inaugural Gawad Urian for Best Supporting Actor is given in 1977 to Ruel Vernal for his role in Insiang. Volpi Cup winner John Arcilla has the most nominations in this category with seven. Meanwhile, three veteran actors have won the most times in this category: Albert Martinez, Art Acuña and Soliman Cruz, who all have won this award twice.

The current award holder is Felipe Ganancial for the film Tumandok.

== Winners and nominees ==
The winner is shown first, followed by the other nominees.

=== 1970s ===
| Year | Actor | Film | Role |
|---|---|---|---|
1977 (1st)
| 1977 (1st) | Ruel Vernal | Insiang | Dado |
| 1977 (1st) | E.A. Rocha | Ganito Kami Noon... Paano Kayo Ngayon? | Padre Gil Corcuera |
| 1977 (1st) | Dranreb Belleza | Ganito Kami Noon... Paano Kayo Ngayon? | Bindoy |
| 1977 (1st) | Leopoldo Salcedo | Minsa'y Isang Gamu-gamo | |
| 1977 (1st) | Mario Montenegro | Itim | Dr. Torres |
| 1977 (1st) | Paquito Salcedo | Minsa'y Isang Gamu-gamo | Inkong Menciong |
1978 (2nd)
| 1978 (2nd) | Lito Legaspi | Sinong Kapiling? Sinong Kasiping? | |
| 1978 (2nd) | Dindo Fernando | Inay | Maning |
| 1978 (2nd) | Leroy Salvador | Mga Bilanggong Birhen | Señor Juan |
| 1978 (2nd) | Mat Ranillo III | Dalawang Pugad… Isang Ibon | Mel |
| 1978 (2nd) | Rolly Quizon | Burlesk Queen | Jessie |
1979 (3rd)
| 1979 (3rd) | Joonee Gamboa | Pagputi ng Uwak... Pag-itim ng Tagak | Maestro Roque |
| 1979 (3rd) | Anthony Alonzo | Hindi sa Iyo ang Mundo, Baby Porcuna | Boy |
| 1979 (3rd) | Dick Israel | Hindi sa Iyo ang Mundo, Baby Porcuna | Cris |
| 1979 (3rd) | Edwin Sandico | Mga Tinik ng Babae | |
| 1979 (3rd) | Ernie Zarate | Ikaw ay Akin | |
| 1979 (3rd) | Joseph Sytangco | Hindi sa Iyo ang Mundo, Baby Porcuna | Tommy |

=== 1980s ===
| Year | Actor | Film | Role |
|---|---|---|---|
1980 (4th)
| 1980 (4th) | Menggie Cobarrubias | Jaguar | Sonny Gaston |
| 1980 (4th) | Cesar Topacio | Aliw | |
| 1980 (4th) | Ric Rodrigo | Ina, Kapatid, Anak | Manoling |
| 1980 (4th) | Roderick Paulate | High School Circa '65 | |
| 1980 (4th) | Walter Navarro | Boy Kodyak | |
1981 (5th)
| 1981 (5th) | Johnny Delgado | Kakabakaba Ka Ba? | Pinoy Master |
| 1981 (5th) | Boboy Garrovillo | Kakabakaba Ka Ba? | Onota |
| 1981 (5th) | Jay Ilagan | Aguila | Osman Aguila |
| 1981 (5th) | Johnny Delgado | Brutal | Jake |
| 1981 (5th) | Joonee Gamboa | Aguila | Arcadio "Cadio" Cuevas |
1982 (6th)
| 1982 (6th) | Jay Ilagan | Kisapmata | Noel Manalansan |
| 1982 (6th) | Bruno Punzalan | Salome | |
| 1982 (6th) | Ernie Forte | Pepeng Shotgun | Ador |
| 1982 (6th) | Phillip Salvador | Playgirl | |
| 1982 (6th) | Ruben Rustia | Pepeng Shotgun | Pablo Medrano |
1983 (7th)
| 1983 (7th) | Mark Gil | Palipat-lipat, Papalit-palit | |
| 1983 (7th) | Ariosto Reyes Jr. | Dormitoryo! Buhay Estudyante | |
| 1983 (7th) | Jimmy Javier | Batch '81 | Vince |
| 1983 (7th) | Manny Ojeda | Oro, Plata, Mata | Don Claudio Ojeda |
| 1983 (7th) | Paquito Diaz | In This Corner | |
| 1983 (7th) | Rodolfo "Boy" Garcia | Ito Ba ang Ating Mga Anak | |
| 1983 (7th) | Ronnie Lazaro | Oro, Plata, Mata | Hermes Mercurio |
1984 (8th)
| 1984 (8th) | Vic Silayan | Karnal | Gusting |
| 1984 (8th) | Joel Torre | Karnal | Goryo |
| 1984 (8th) | Len Santos | Broken Marriage | |
| 1984 (8th) | Ray Ventura | Broken Marriage | Ronnie |
1985 (9th)
| 1985 (9th) | Tony Santos | Sister Stella L. | Ka Dencio |
| 1985 (9th) | Alfredo Navarro Salanga | Boatman | |
| 1985 (9th) | Cesar Aliparo | 'Merika | Lolo Caloy |
| 1985 (9th) | Dindo Fernando | Baby Tsina | Jorge |
| 1985 (9th) | Len Santos | Baby Tsina | Sandra |
1986 (10th)
| 1986 (10th) | Lito Anzures | Paradise Inn | Joaquin |
| 1986 (10th) | Ariosto Reyes Jr. | Bayan Ko | Willy |
| 1986 (10th) | Michael de Mesa | Ano ang Kulay ng Mukha ng Diyos? | Fidel Alipio |
| 1986 (10th) | Michael de Mesa | Paradise Inn | Rey |
| 1986 (10th) | Venchito Galvez | Bayan Ko | Ka Ador |
1987 (11th)
| 1987 (11th) | Aga Muhlach | Napakasakit, Kuya Eddie | Dino |
| 1987 (11th) | Joel Lamangan | Bagong Hari | |
| 1987 (11th) | Joel Torre | Bagong Hari | Rex |
| 1987 (11th) | Robert Arevalo | Bagong Hari | |
1988
| 1988 | The MPP decides not to give out any awards this year. | | |
1989 (12th)
| 1989 (12th) | Lito Pimentel | Kapag Napagod ang Puso | |
| 1989 (12th) | Anjo Yllana | Kapag Napagod ang Puso | |
| 1989 (12th) | Atong Redillas | Ex-Army | A.K. |
| 1989 (12th) | Baldo Marro | Boy Negro | Gustin |
| 1989 (12th) | R.R. Herrera | Ex-Army | Miko |

=== 1990s ===
| Year | Actor | Film | Role |
|---|---|---|---|
1990 (13th)
| 1990 (13th) | Eric Quizon | Pahiram ng Isang Umaga | Ariel |
| 1990 (13th) | Dante Rivero | Kailan Mahuhugasan ang Kasalanan? | Oscar Lanting |
| 1990 (13th) | Efren Reyes Jr. | Tatak ng Isang Api | Henry |
| 1990 (13th) | Johnny Vicar | Macho Dancer | Kid |
1991 (14th)
| 1991 (14th) | Michael de Mesa | Ikasa Mo, Ipuputok Ko | Boboy Sanchez |
| 1991 (14th) | Bembol Roco | Gumapang Ka sa Lusak | Falcon |
| 1991 (14th) | Christopher de Leon | Gumapang Ka sa Lusak | Levi |
| 1991 (14th) | Eddie Garcia | Gumapang Ka sa Lusak | Edmundo Guatlo |
| 1991 (14th) | Robert Arevalo | Ama... Bakit Mo Ako Pinabayaan? | |
1992 (15th)
| 1992 (15th) | Gabby Concepcion | Makiusap Ka sa Diyos | Allan |
| 1992 (15th) | Leo Martinez | Juan Tamad at Mister Shooli: Mongolian Barbecue | Manhik-Manaog |
| 1992 (15th) | Michael de Mesa | Hihintayin Kita sa Langit | Milo Salvador |
| 1992 (15th) | Ronaldo Valdez | Sa Kabila ng Lahat | Mayor Ventura Velasco |
| 1992 (15th) | Terence Baylon | Ipagpatawad Mo | Junjun |
1993 (16th)
| 1993 (16th) | Tirso Cruz III | Kahit Buhay Ko | Melgar |
| 1993 (16th) | Ariel Rivera | Bakit Labis Kitang Mahal | David |
| 1993 (16th) | Gabby Concepcion | Sinungaling Mong Puso | Roman |
| 1993 (16th) | Jess Lapid Jr. | Lumayo Ka Man sa Akin | Brixio |
| 1993 (16th) | Johnny Delgado | Lumayo Ka Man sa Akin | Jaime |
1994 (17th)
| 1994 (17th) | Ronaldo Valdez | May Minamahal | Cenon Fernandez |
| 1994 (17th) | Al Tantay | Kung Ako'y Iiwan Mo | Pedring |
| 1994 (17th) | Cesar Montano | Hanggang Saan, Hanggang Kailan | Anselmo |
| 1994 (17th) | Pen Medina | Sakay | Col. Lucio de Vega |
1995 (18th)
| 1995 (18th) | John Regala | The Fatima Buen Story | Leslie Baron |
| 1995 (18th) | Albert Martinez | Pangako ng Kahapon | |
| 1995 (18th) | Bembol Roco | Wating | Bert |
| 1995 (18th) | John Estrada | Hindi Magbabago | Chubby |
| 1995 (18th) | Romnick Sarmenta | Johnny Tiñoso and the Proud Beauty | Ricky |
| 1995 (18th) | Zoren Legaspi | The Fatima Buen Story | Oscar Kintanar |
1996 (19th)
| 1996 (19th) | Ricky Davao | Ipaglaban Mo: The Movie | Allan |
| 1996 (19th) | Albert Martinez | Muling Umawit ang Puso | Miguel Sanchez |
| 1996 (19th) | Nonie Buencamino | Sibak: Midnight Dancers | Dave |
| 1996 (19th) | Tirso Cruz III | Inagaw Mo ang Lahat sa Akin | Peping |
| 1996 (19th) | Tonton Gutierrez | Dahas | Eric |
1997 (20th)
| 1997 (20th) | Albert Martinez | Segurista | Jake |
| 1997 (20th) | Joel Torre | Mumbaki | Dr. Felix Lorenzo |
| 1997 (20th) | John Arcilla | Mulanay: Sa Pusod ng Paraiso | |
| 1997 (20th) | John Estrada | Radio Romance | Lester Carmona |
| 1997 (20th) | Nonie Buencamino | Mulanay: Sa Pusod ng Paraiso | |
| 1997 (20th) | Stefano Mori | May Nagmamahal sa Iyo | Conrad |
1998 (21st)
| 1998 (21st) | John Arcilla | Ligaya ang Itawag Mo sa Akin | Polding |
| 1998 (21st) | Albert Martinez | Nang Iniwan Mo Ako | Anton Lorenzo |
| 1998 (21st) | Dante Rivero | Milagros | Nano |
| 1998 (21st) | Mark Gil | Babae | |
| 1998 (21st) | Pen Medina | Ligaya ang Itawag Mo sa Akin | Tikyo |
| 1998 (21st) | Ray Ventura | Bayad Puri | Greta |
1999 (22nd)
| 1999 (22nd) | Jaime Fabregas | Jose Rizal | Luis Taviel de Andrade |
| 1999 (22nd) | Allan Paule | Ang Lalaki sa Buhay ni Selya | Carding |
| 1999 (22nd) | Carlo Aquino | Bata, Bata... Paano Ka Ginawa? | Ojie |
| 1999 (22nd) | Cris Villanueva | Miguel/Michelle | Julio |
| 1999 (22nd) | Efren Reyes Jr. | Ang Babae sa Bintana | |
| 1999 (22nd) | Frank Rivera | Babae sa Bubungang Lata | |
| 1999 (22nd) | Raymond Bagatsing | Bata, Bata... Paano Ka Ginawa? | Johnny |
| 1999 (22nd) | Richard Joson | Serafin Geronimo: Ang Kriminal ng Baryo Concepcion | Miguel |

=== 2000s ===
| Year | Actor | Film | Role |
|---|---|---|---|
2000 (23rd)
| 2000 (23rd) | Joel Torre | Bayaning 3rd World | Jose Rizal |
| 2000 (23rd) | Allyson VII | Sa Paraiso ni Efren | Anthony |
| 2000 (23rd) | Ed Rocha | Bayaning 3rd World | Padre Balaguer |
| 2000 (23rd) | Jhong Hilario | Muro-Ami | Botong Maldepena |
| 2000 (23rd) | Leonardo Litton | Burlesk King | James |
| 2000 (23rd) | Pen Medina | Muro-Ami | Diosdado "Diyos-Dado" Lacar |
| 2000 (23rd) | Raymond Bagatsing | Soltera | Jojo Morales |
2001 (24th)
| 2001 (24th) | Jeffrey Quizon | Markova: Comfort Gay | Young Walterina Markova |
| 2001 (24th) | Baron Geisler | Anak | Michael |
| 2001 (24th) | Jericho Rosales | Tanging Yaman | Rommel |
| 2001 (24th) | Nante Montreal | Tuhog | Gabino |
| 2001 (24th) | Pen Medina | Lagarista | Jimmy |
| 2001 (24th) | Ray Ventura | Deathrow | "Mayor" Mio |
2002 (25th)
| 2002 (25th) | Raul Arellano | Batang West Side | Dindo |
| 2002 (25th) | Carlo Muñoz | Yamashita: The Tiger's Treasure | Young Carmelo Rosales |
| 2002 (25th) | Jay Manalo | Hubog | Uno |
| 2002 (25th) | Jiro Manio | La Vida Rosa | Enteng |
| 2002 (25th) | Simon Ibarra | Live Show | Vio |
| 2002 (25th) | Wendell Ramos | Hubog | Oliver |
2003 (26th)
| 2003 (26th) | Piolo Pascual | Dekada '70 | Julian "Jules" Bartolome Jr. |
| 2003 (26th) | Jay Manalo | Mano Po | Emerson Lau |
| 2003 (26th) | Jeffrey Quizon | Utang ni Tatang | Rick |
| 2003 (26th) | Johnny Delgado | Kailangan Kita | Rogelio Duran |
| 2003 (26th) | Tirso Cruz III | Mano Po | Daniel Go |
2004 (27th)
| 2004 (27th) | Albert Martinez | Magnifico | Gerry |
| 2004 (27th) | Alfred Vargas | Bridal Shower | |
| 2004 (27th) | Eric Quizon | Crying Ladies | Wilson Chua |
| 2004 (27th) | Jericho Rosales | Noon at Ngayon | Levi |
| 2004 (27th) | Julio Pacheco | Crying Ladies | Bong |
| 2004 (27th) | Mark Gil | Magnifico | Domeng |
| 2004 (27th) | Victor Neri | Filipinas | Emman Filipinas |
2005 (28th)
| 2005 (28th) | Wendell Ramos | Sabel | Jojo |
| 2005 (28th) | Dennis Trillo | Aishite Imasu 1941: Mahal Kita | Ignacio Basa / Igna |
| 2005 (28th) | Jacky Woo | Panaghoy sa Suba | Fumio Okohara |
| 2005 (28th) | Roeder Camanag | Ebolusyon ng Isang Pamilyang Pilipino | Bendo |
2006 (29th)
| 2006 (29th) | Ketchup Eusebio | Ang Daan Patungong Kalimugtong | |
| 2006 (29th) | Johnny Delgado | La Visa Loca | Pepang |
| 2006 (29th) | Michael de Mesa | Big Time | Don Manolo |
| 2006 (29th) | Ping Medina | Ang Pagdadalaga ni Maximo Oliveros | Bogs Oliveros |
| 2006 (29th) | Soliman Cruz | Ang Pagdadalaga ni Maximo Oliveros | Paco Oliveros |
2007 (30th)
| 2007 (30th) | Rafael Rosell | Rome & Juliet | Marc |
| 2007 (30th) | Allan Paule | Kaleldo | Andy Pineda |
| 2007 (30th) | Archi Adamos | Raket ni Nanay | |
| 2007 (30th) | Doming Landicho | Kubrador | Tatay Nick |
| 2007 (30th) | Jeffrey Quizon | Rotonda | |
| 2007 (30th) | Lauren Novero | Kaleldo | Conrad |
| 2007 (30th) | Ping Medina | Tulad ng Dati | Teddy Diaz |
| 2007 (30th) | Soliman Cruz | Kasal, Kasali, Kasalo | Rommell Mariano |
2008 (31st)
| 2008 (31st) | Emilio Garcia | Selda | Esteban |
| 2008 (31st) | Alchris Galura | Endo | |
| 2008 (31st) | Benjie Filomeno | Tirador | |
| 2008 (31st) | Coco Martin | Tambolista | Billy |
| 2008 (31st) | Jiro Manio | Foster Child | Yuri |
| 2008 (31st) | Publio J. Briones III | Confessional | Lito Caliso |
| 2008 (31st) | Sid Lucero | Tambolista | Pablo |
2009 (32nd)
| 2009 (32nd) | Coco Martin | Jay | Edward Navarro |
| 2009 (32nd) | Archie Alemania | Baby Angelo | |
| 2009 (32nd) | Julio Diaz | Serbis | Lando |
| 2009 (32nd) | Roeder Camanag | Melancholia | Renato Munoz |
| 2009 (32nd) | Yul Servo | Brutus | Carlito / Ka Milo |

=== 2010s ===
| Year | Actor | Film | Role |
|---|---|---|---|
2010 (33rd)
| 2010 (33rd) | Soliman Cruz | Himpapawid | Juan |
| 2010 (33rd) | Ariel Ureta | Kimmy Dora: Kambal sa Kiyeme | Luisito |
| 2010 (33rd) | Dennis Ascalon | The Arrival | |
| 2010 (33rd) | Jake Roxas | Walang Hanggang Paalam | Arturo Lopez |
| 2010 (33rd) | John Arcilla | Himpapawid | |
| 2010 (33rd) | John Regala | Kinatay | Sarge |
| 2010 (33rd) | Jose Mari Javellana | Colorum | Tomas Verdolagas |
| 2010 (33rd) | Milton Dionson | The Arrival | |
2011 (34th)
| 2011 (34th) | Joem Bascon | Noy | Bong |
| 2011 (34th) | Cogie Domingo | Muli | |
| 2011 (34th) | Garret Dillahunt | Amigo | Lt. Compton |
| 2011 (34th) | Gregg Tecson | Ang Damgo ni Eleuteria | Tatay |
| 2011 (34th) | Julio Diaz | Magkakapatid | |
| 2011 (34th) | Martin de los Santos | Tsardyer | Shihab |
| 2011 (34th) | Rocky Salumbides | Tarima | |
| 2011 (34th) | Tirso Cruz III | Sigwa | Oliver |
| 2011 (34th) | Yul Vazquez | Amigo | Padre Hidalgo |
2012 (35th)
| 2012 (35th) | Art Acuña | Niño | |
| 2012 (35th) | Bembol Roco | Isda | Miguel |
| 2012 (35th) | Dido de la Paz | Amok | |
| 2012 (35th) | Gary Lim | Amok | |
| 2012 (35th) | Jake Cuenca | In the Name of Love | Dylan Evelino |
| 2012 (35th) | Joem Bascon | Ka Oryang | |
| 2012 (35th) | John Regala | Manila Kingpin: The Asiong Salonga Story | Totoy Golem |
| 2012 (35th) | Jojit Lorenzo | Anatomiya ng Korupsiyon | Bok |
| 2012 (35th) | Mark Gil | Amok | |
| 2012 (35th) | Marvin Agustin | Patikul | |
| 2012 (35th) | Ronnie Lazaro | Manila Kingpin: The Asiong Salonga Story | Boy Zapanta |
2013 (36th)
| 2013 (36th) | Art Acuña | Posas | Inspector Domingo |
| 2013 (36th) | Carlo Aquino | Mater Dolorosa | Elijah Lagrimas |
| 2013 (36th) | Dax Alejandro | Qwerty | Dela Cruz |
| 2013 (36th) | Joross Gamboa | Intoy Syokoy ng Kalye Marino | |
2014 (37th)
| 2014 (37th) | Jun Jun Quintana | Philippino Story | Philip |
| 2014 (37th) | Archie Alemania | Norte, Hangganan ng Kasaysayan | Joaquin |
| 2014 (37th) | Art Acuña | Kabisera | Jose Romualdez |
| 2014 (37th) | Bor Ocampo | Dukit | |
| 2014 (37th) | Carlo Aquino | Porno | Aleks |
| 2014 (37th) | Cesar Montano | Alamat ni China Doll | |
| 2014 (37th) | Joey Marquez | On the Job | SP01 Joaquin Acosta |
| 2014 (37th) | John Arcilla | Metro Manila | Ong |
| 2014 (37th) | Victor Basa | Lauriana | |
| 2014 (37th) | Yul Servo | Porno | Xander |
2015 (38th)
| 2015 (38th) | Martin del Rosario | Dagitab | Gab Atienza |
| 2015 (38th) | Jess Mendoza | Mauban: Ang Resiko | Dudut |
| 2015 (38th) | Joel Lamangan | Violator | Benito Alano |
| 2015 (38th) | Karl Medina | Bwaya | Rex |
| 2015 (38th) | Nicco Manalo | Barber's Tales | Edmond |
| 2015 (38th) | Nico Antonio | Red | Milton |
| 2015 (38th) | Noel Sto. Domingo | Mula sa Kung Ano ang Noon | |
| 2015 (38th) | Roeder Camanag | Mula sa Kung Ano ang Noon | Tony |
2016 (39th)
| 2016 (39th) | Bernardo Bernardo | Imbisibol | Benjie |
| 2016 (39th) | Alion Ibañez | Da Dog Show | Alvin |
| 2016 (39th) | JM de Guzman | Imbisibol | Rodel |
| 2016 (39th) | Julio Diaz | Taklub | Larry |
| 2016 (39th) | Lou Veloso | Taklub | Renato |
| 2016 (39th) | Micko Laurente | Bambanti | Popoy |
| 2016 (39th) | RK Bagatsing | Apocalypse Child | Rich |
| 2016 (39th) | Tirso Cruz III | Honor Thy Father | Bishop Tony |
2017 (40th)
| 2017 (40th) | Christian Bables | Die Beautiful | Barbs |
| 2017 (40th) | Jess Mendoza | Hinulid | |
| 2017 (40th) | John Lloyd Cruz | Ang Babaeng Humayo | Hollanda |
| 2017 (40th) | Julio Diaz | Ma' Rosa | Nestor |
| 2017 (40th) | Nonie Buencamino | Ang Babaeng Humayo | Magbabalot |
| 2017 (40th) | Taha Daranda | Women of the Weeping River | Mustafa |
2018 (41st)
| 2018 (41st) | Dido de la Paz | Respeto | Fortunato "Doc" Reyes |
| 2018 (41st) | Arnold Reyes | Birdshot | Domingo |
| 2018 (41st) | Jess Mendoza | Sa Gabing Nanahimik ang Mga Kuliglig | Shokla Bakla Gay |
| 2018 (41st) | John Arcilla | Birdshot | Mendoza |
| 2018 (41st) | Nor Domingo | Respeto | Fuentes |
| 2018 (41st) | Pio del Rio | Balangiga: Howling Wilderness | Apoy Buroy |
| 2018 (41st) | Robert Arevalo | Ang Larawan | Don Perico |
| 2018 (41st) | Romulo Caballero | The Chanters | Lolo Ramon |
| 2018 (41st) | Ronwaldo Martin | Bhoy Intsik | |
2019 (42nd)
| 2019 (42nd) | Joel Lamangan | School Service | |
| 2019 (42nd) | Arjo Atayde | BuyBust | Biggie Chen |
| 2019 (42nd) | Lou Veloso | Citizen Jake | Lucas |
| 2019 (42nd) | Nonie Buencamino | Citizen Jake | The Judge |
| 2019 (42nd) | Romnick Sarmenta | Kung Paano Hinihintay ang Dapithapon | Chito |
| 2019 (42nd) | Teroy de Guzman | Citizen Jake | Jacobo Herrera Sr. |
| 2019 (42nd) | Victor Neri | BuyBust | Bernie Lacson |

=== 2020s ===
| Year | Actor | Film | Role |
|---|---|---|---|
2020 (43rd)
| 2020 (43rd) | Kristoffer King | Verdict | Dante Santos |
| 2020 (43rd) | Dido de la Paz | Edward | Mario |
| 2020 (43rd) | JC Santos | Babae at Baril | Miguel |
| 2020 (43rd) | Noel John Naval | Huwebes Huwebes | |
| 2020 (43rd) | Ricky Davao | Fuccbois | Mayor Fernan |
| 2020 (43rd) | Topper Fabregas | Sila-Sila | Jared |
| 2020 (43rd) | Yves Flores | Lola Igna | Tim |
2021 (44th)
| 2021 (44th) | Micko Laurente | Watch List | |
| 2021 (44th) | Dino Pastrano | Midnight in a Perfect World | Tonichi |
| 2021 (44th) | Enzo Pineda | He Who Is Without Sin | Lawrence |
| 2021 (44th) | Jake Macapagal | Watch List | Lt. Ventura |
| 2021 (44th) | Jess Mendoza | Watch List | Arturo |
2022 (45th)
| 2022 (45th) | Dante Rivero | On the Job: The Missing 8 | Mayor Pedring Eusebio |
| 2022 (45th) | Dennis Trillo | On the Job: The Missing 8 | Roman Rubio |
| 2022 (45th) | John Arcilla | A Hard Day | Lt. Ace "Alas" Franco |
| 2022 (45th) | John Arcilla | Big Night! | Donato Rapido |
| 2022 (45th) | Ronnie Lazaro | Gensan Punch | Coach Rudy |
| 2022 (45th) | Sandino Martin | Walang Kasarian ang Digmang Bayan | |
2023 (46th)
| 2023 (46th) | Soliman Cruz | Blue Room | |
| 2023 (46th) | Dido de la Paz | Ginhawa | Coach Jun |
| 2023 (46th) | Juan Karlos Labajo | Blue Room | |
| 2023 (46th) | Rocky Salumbides | Leonor Will Never Die | Ronwaldo |
| 2023 (46th) | Ronnie Lazaro | Kapag Wala nang Mga Alon | Primo Macabantay |
2024 (47th)
| 2024 (47th) | Ronnie Lazaro | The Gospel of the Beast | Berto |
| 2024 (47th) | Dante Rivero | GomBurZa | Padre Mariano Gomez de los Ángeles |
| 2024 (47th) | Enchong Dee | GomBurZa | Padre Jacinto Zamora y del Rosario |
| 2024 (47th) | Jeffrey Quizon | Firefly | Louie |
| 2024 (47th) | Piolo Pascual | GomBurZa | Padre Pedro Peláez |
2025 (48th)
| 2025 (48th) | Felipe Ganancial | Tumandok | |
| 2025 (48th) | Art Acuña | An Errand | Sir |
| 2025 (48th) | David Ezra | Isang Himala | Orly |
| 2025 (48th) | Nor Domingo | The Hearing | |
| 2025 (48th) | Takehiro Hira | Crosspoint | Shigeru Yamaguchi |

== Multiple wins and nominations ==
The following individuals have won two or more Gawad Urian Awards for Best Supporting Actor:

| Wins | Actor | Nominations | First Win | Latest Win |
|---|---|---|---|---|
| 2 | Albert Martinez | 5 | Segurista (1997) | Magnifico (2004) |
| 2 | Art Acuña | 4 | Niño (2012) | Posas (2013) |
| 2 | Soliman Cruz | 4 | Himpapawid (2010) | Blue Room (2023) |

The following individuals have received four or more Best Supporting Actor nominations:

| Nominations | Actor | First Nomination | Latest Nomination |
|---|---|---|---|
| 7 | John Arcilla | Mulanay: Sa Pusod ng Paraiso (1997) | A Hard Day & Big Night! (2022) |
| 5 | Albert Martinez | Pangako ng Kahapon (1995) | Magnifico (2004) |
| 5 | Johnny Delgado | Brutal (1981) | La Visa Loca (2006) |
| 5 | Michael de Mesa | Paradise Inn (1986) | Big Time (2006) |
| 5 | Ronnie Lazaro | Oro, Plata, Mata (1983) | The Gospel of the Beast (2024) |
| 5 | Tirso Cruz III | Kahit Buhay Ko (1993) | Honor Thy Father (2016) |
| 4 | Art Acuña | Niño (2012) | An Errand (2025) |
| 4 | Dante Rivero | Kailan Mahuhugasan ang Kasalanan? (1990) | GomBurZa (2024) |
| 4 | Dido de la Paz | Amok (2012) | Ginhawa (2023) |
| 4 | Jeffrey Quizon | Markova: Comfort Gay (2001) | Firefly (2024) |
| 4 | Jess Mendoza | Mauban: Ang Resiko (2015) | Watch List (2021) |
| 4 | Joel Torre | Karnal (1984) | Bayaning 3rd World (2000) |
| 4 | Julio Diaz | Serbis (2009) | Ma' Rosa (2017) |
| 4 | Mark Gil | Palipat-lipat, Papalit-palit (1983) | Amok (2012) |
| 4 | Nonie Buencamino | Sibak (1996) | Citizen Jake (2019) |
| 4 | Pen Medina | Sakay (1994) | Lagarista (2001) |
| 4 | Soliman Cruz | Ang Pagdadalaga ni Maximo Oliveros (2006) | Blue Room (2023) |
