= 26th Gawad Urian Awards =

2009 Philippine film awards ceremony

- Date: May 17, 2003
- Site: AFP Theater; Camp Aguinaldo; Quezon City

Highlights
- Best Picture: Dekada '70; Mga Munting Tinig
- Most awards: Dekada '70 (4)
- Most nominations: Mano Po (10); Mga Munting Tinig (10)

The 26th Gawad Urian Awards (Filipino: Ika-26 na Gawad Urian) is held on May 17, 2003. It honors the best Philippine films of 2002. The event is held at AFP Theater of Camp Aguinaldo in Quezon City.

The Natatanging Gawad Urian, equivalent to a Lifetime Achievement Award, is bestowed upon celebrated screenwriter Ricky Lee. This is the first time that there is a tie in Best Picture between Dekada '70 and Mga Munting Tinig.

== Winners and nominees ==
Winners are listed first and bolded.

Best Picture Pinakamahusay na Pelikula	Best Director Pinakamahusay na Direksyon
**Dekada '70**; **Mga Munting Tinig**; Laman; Mano Po	**Mga Munting Tinig – Gil Portes**; American Adobo – Laurice Guillen; Dekada '70 – Chito S. Roño; Kailangan Kita – Rory B. Quintos; Laman – Maryo J. de los Reyes; Mano Po – Joel Lamangan
Best Actor Pinakamahusay na Pangunahing Aktor	Best Actress Pinakamahusay na Pangunahing Aktres
**Jay Manalo – Prosti**; Aga Muhlach – Kailangan Kita; Albert Martinez – Laman; Christopher de Leon – Dekada '70; Ricky Davao – American Adobo; Rudy Fernandez – Diskarte; Vhong Navarro – Jologs; Yul Servo – Laman	**Vilma Santos – Dekada '70**; Alessandra de Rossi – Mga Munting Tinig; Ara Mina – Mano Po; Cherry Pie Picache – American Adobo; Claudine Barretto – Kailangan Kita; Dina Bonnevie – American Adobo
Best Supporting Actor Pinakamahusay na Pangalawang Aktor	Best Supporting Actress Pinakamahusay na Pangalawang Aktres
**Piolo Pascual – Dekada '70**; Jay Manalo – Mano Po; Jeffrey Quizon – Utang ni Tatang; Johnny Delgado – Kailangan Kita; Tirso Cruz III – Mano Po	**Elizabeth Oropesa – Laman**; Amy Austria – Mano Po; Dexter Doria – Mga Munting Tinig; Judy Ann Santos – Magkapatid; Kris Aquino – Mano Po; Madeleine Nicolas – Masikip Mainit... Paraisong Parisukat; Raquel Villavicencio – Prosti
Best Screenplay Pinakamahusay na Dulang Pampelikula	Best Cinematography Pinakamahusay na Sinematograpiya
**Dekada '70** – **Lualhati Bautista**; Jologs – Ned Trespeces; Laman – Wali Ching; Mano Po – Roy Iglesias; Mga Munting Tinig – Gil Portes, Adolfo Alix Jr. & Senedy Que; Prosti – Roy Iglesias	**Kailangan Kita**; Mano Po; Mga Munting Tinig; Prosti; Utang ni Tatang
Best Production Design Pinakamahusay na Disenyong Pamproduksyon	Best Editing Pinakamahusay na Editing
**Mga Munting Tinig**; Dekada '70; Kailangan Kita; Laman; Masikip Mainit... Paraisong Parisukat	**Diskarte**; Jologs; Laman; Mano Po; Mga Munting Tinig
Best Music Pinakamahusay na Musika	Best Sound Pinakamahusay na Tunog
**Diskarte**; Jologs; Kailangan Kita; Laman; Mga Munting Tinig	**American Adobo**; Dekada '70; Diskarte; Mga Munting Tinig

== Special Award ==
=== Natatanging Gawad Urian ===
- Ricky Lee

=== Best Short Film ===
- Binyag by Mariami Tanangco
