= 29th Gawad Urian Awards =

2009 Philippine film awards ceremony

- Date: August 9, 2006
- Site: Henry Lee Irwin Theater Quezon City

Highlights
- Best Picture: Ang Pagdadalaga ni Maximo Oliveros
- Most awards: Ang Pagdadalaga ni Maximo Oliveros (4)
- Most nominations: Ang Daan Patungong Kalimugtong (12)

The 29th Gawad Urian Awards (Filipino: Ika-29 na Gawad Urian) is held on August 2006. Organized by the Manunuri ng Pelikulang Pilipino, it honors the best Philippine films of 2005. The ceremony is held at the Henry Lee Irwin Theater at the Ateneo de Manila University and hosted by Pia Guanio, Janno Gibbs and Ogie Alcasid.

It is a big night for indie films and first-time winners. The Best Picture award goes to Ang Pagdadalaga ni Maximo Oliveros, a coming-of-age film about a prepubescent boy. Industry veterans Robin Padilla and Hilda Koronel win their first Urian awards for Best Actor and Best Supporting Actress respectively. Young actor Ketchup Eusebio bests veteran actors for Best Supporting Actor and collects his first Urian award. Jaclyn Jose wins her third Best Actress trophy and fifth Urian overall for her role in Sarung Banggi. The prestigious 2006 Natatanging Gawad Urian award goes to veteran actor-director Eddie Garcia.

== Winners and nominees ==
Winners are listed first and bolded.

Best Picture Pinakamahusay na Pelikula	Best Director Pinakamahusay na Direksyon
**Ang Pagdadalaga ni Maximo Oliveros**; Ala Verde, Ala Pobre; Ang Daan Patungong Kalimugtong; Big Time; Blue Moon; La Visa Loca	**Mes De Guzman – Ang Daan Patungong Kalimugtong**; Auraeus Solito – Ang Pagdadalaga ni Maximo Oliveros; Briccio Santos – Ala Verde, Ala Pobre; Joel Lamangan – Blue Moon; Mario Cornejo – Big Time
Best Actor Pinakamahusay na Pangunahing Aktor	Best Actress Pinakamahusay na Pangunahing Aktres
**Robin Padilla – La Visa Loca**; Carlo Aquino – Sa Aking Pagkakagising Mula sa Kamulatan; Dennis Trillo – Blue Moon; Jamie Wilson – Big Time; Nathan Lopez – Ang Pagdadalaga ni Maximo Oliveros; Rhenuel Ordono – Ang Daan Patungong Kalimugtong; Ricky Davao – Mga Pusang Gala; Yul Servo – Ilusyon	**Jaclyn Jose** **– Sarung Banggi**; Ana Capri – Ala Verde, Ala Pobre; Analyn Bangsi-il – Ang Daan Patungong Kalimugtong; Claudine Barretto – Nasaan Ka Man; Irma Adlawan – Sa North Diversion Road; JC Parker – Ilusyon
Best Supporting Actor Pinakamahusay na Pangalawang Aktor	Best Supporting Actress Pinakamahusay na Pangalawang Aktres
**Ketchup Eusebio – Ang Daan Patungong Kalimugtong**; Johnny Delgado – La Visa Loca; Michael de Mesa – Big Time; Ping Medina – Ang Pagdadalaga ni Maximo Oliveros; Soliman Cruz – Ang Pagdadalaga ni Maximo Oliveros	**Hilda Koronel – Nasaan Ka Man**; Boots Anson-Roa – Blue Moon; Gloria Diaz – Nasaan Ka Man; Hallen Sumingwa – Ang Daan Patungong Kalimugtong; Jennylyn Mercado – Blue Moon; Joy Soler-de Castro – Pepot Artista
Best Screenplay Pinakamahusay na Dulang Pampelikula	Best Cinematography Pinakamahusay na Sinematograpiya
**Ang Pagdadalaga ni Maximo Oliveros** – **Michiko Yamamoto**; Ang Daan Patungong Kalimugtong – Mes De Guzman; Big Time – Mario Cornejo & Monster Jimenez; La Visa Loca – Mark Meily; Sa Aking Pagkakagising Mula sa Kamulatan – Shugo Praico	**Ang Pagdadalaga ni Maximo Oliveros** – **Nap Jamir**; Ang Daan Patungong Kalimugtong – Albert Banzon; Blue Moon – Lyle Sacris; Dilim – Wowie Hao & Odyssey Flores; Ilusyon – Odyssey Flores; Masahista – Timmy Jimenez & Monchie Redoble; Nasaan Ka Man – Charlie Peralta
Best Production Design Pinakamahusay na Disenyong Pamproduksyon	Best Editing Pinakamahusay na Editing
**Ang Daan Patungong Kalimugtong – Mes De Guzman**; Ala Verde, Ala Pobre – Anil Rao & Briccio Santos; Ang Pagdadalaga ni Maximo Oliveros – Clint Catalan, Christina Dy & Lily Esquillon; Big Time – Christina Dy; La Visa Loca – Norman Regalado; Masahista – Benjamin Padero	**Ang Pagdadalaga ni Maximo Oliveros** – **Clarence Sison & Auraeus Solito**; Ala Verde, Ala Pobre – Anil Rao; Ang Daan Patungong Kalimugtong – Noel Montano & Mes De Guzman; Big Time – Mario Cornejo & Monster Jimenez; Blue Moon – Marya Ignacio; Dilim – Anna Isabelle Matutina & Hector Macaso; Ilusyon – Paolo Villaluna & Ellen Ramos
Best Music Pinakamahusay na Musika	Best Sound Pinakamahusay na Tunog
**La Visa Loca – Vincent De Jesus**; Ang Daan Patungong Kalimugtong – Bernard "Nio" Manzano; Ang Pagdadalaga ni Maximo Oliveros – Pepe Smith; Blue Moon – Von De Guzman; Mulawin: The Movie – Lutgardo Labad	**Big Time – Raffy Magsaysay**; Ang Daan Patungong Kalimugtong – Bob Macabenta; Blue Moon – Albert Michael Idioma; Dilim – Tris Suguitan; Nasaan Ka Man – Addiss Tabong

== Special Award ==
=== Natatanging Gawad Urian ===
- Eddie Garcia

=== Best Short Film ===
- Kultado, directed by Lawrence Fajardo
