= 46th Gawad Urian Awards =

Award ceremony for Philippine films of 2022

- Date: November 29, 2023
- Site: UPFI Film Center, Diliman, Quezon City

Highlights
- Best Film: Kapag Wala nang Mga Alon
- Most awards: Kapag Wala nang Mga Alon (4) & Leonor Will Never Die (4)
- Most nominations: Blue Room (10) & Leonor Will Never Die (10)

The 46th Gawad Urian Awards (Tagalog: Ika-46 na Gawad Urian) was held on November 29, 2023, at the UPFI Film Center at the University of the Philippines. The best Philippine films for the year 2022 were honored in the event.

Top prize goes to Kapag Wala nang Mga Alon (When the Waves Are Gone), which premiered in the 79th Venice International Film Festival. Other contenders for the Best Picture award include Ma-an L. Asuncion-Dagnalan's teen crime drama, Blue Room, Martika Ramirez Escobar's comedy, Leonor Will Never Die, and the Anna Isabelle Matutina drama, 12 Weeks.

== Winners and nominees ==
Winners are listed first and bolded.

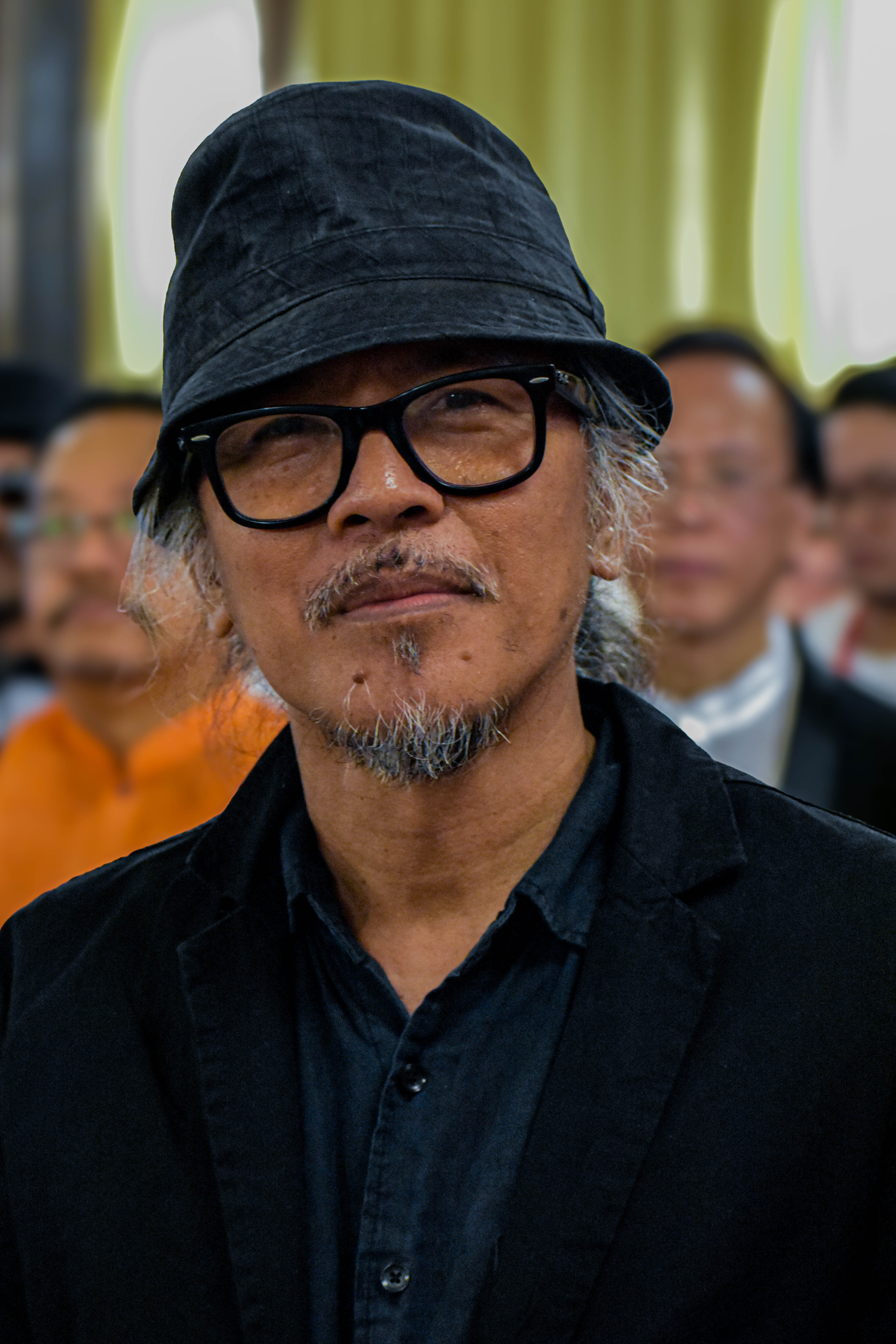
Lav Diaz' film, Kapag Wala nang Mga Alon, bags the Best Picture award. The movie premiered in the 79th Venice International Film Festival.

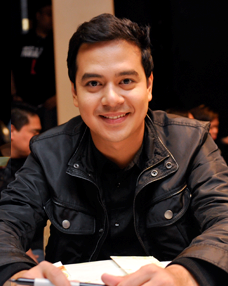
John Lloyd Cruz wins the Best Actor award for his role as Lt. Hermes Papauran in Lav Diaz' film, Kapag Wala nang Mga Alon.

Best Picture Pinakamahusay na Pelikula	Best Director Pinakamahusay na Direksyon
**Kapag Wala nang Mga Alon**; Blue Room; Leonor Will Never Die; 12 Weeks	**Martika Ramirez Escobar – Leonor Will Never Die**; Anna Isabelle Matutina – 12 Weeks; Carlo Obispo – The Baseball Player; Lav Diaz – Kapag Wala nang Mga Alon; Ma-an L. Asuncion-Dagnalan – Blue Room; Mikhail Red – Deleter
Best Actor Pinakamahusay na Pangunahing Aktor	Best Actress Pinakamahusay na Pangunahing Aktres
**John Lloyd Cruz – Kapag Wala nang Mga Alon**; Andrew Ramsay – Ginhawa; Baron Geisler – Doll House; Noel Trinidad – Family Matters; Tommy Alejandrino – The Baseball Player	**Max Eigenmann – 12 Weeks**; Chai Fonacier – Nocebo; Nadine Lustre – Deleter; Sheila Francisco – Leonor Will Never Die
Best Supporting Actor Pinakamahusay na Pangalawang Aktor	Best Supporting Actress Pinakamahusay na Pangalawang Aktres
**Soliman Cruz – Blue Room**; Dido de la Paz – Ginhawa; Juan Karlos Labajo – Blue Room; Rocky Salumbides – Leonor Will Never Die; Ronnie Lazaro – Kapag Wala nang Mga Alon	**Claudia Enriquez – 12 Weeks**; Bing Pimentel – 12 Weeks; Nikki Valdez – Family Matters; Shamaine Buencamino – Kapag Wala nang Mga Alon
Best Screenplay Pinakamahusay na Dulang Pampelikula	Best Cinematography Pinakamahusay na Sinematograpiya
**Kapag Wala nang Mga Alon**; Blue Room; Leonor Will Never Die; Nocebo; Plan 75; 12 Weeks	**Kapag Wala nang Mga Alon**; Blue Room; Deleter; Leonor Will Never Die; Nocebo; Plan 75
Best Production Design Pinakamahusay na Disenyong Pamproduksyon	Best Editing Pinakamahusay na Editing
**Leonor Will Never Die**; Blue Room; Kapag Wala nang Mga Alon; Nocebo	**Leonor Will Never Die**; Blue Room; Deleter; Kapag Wala nang Mga Alon; Nocebo; The Baseball Player
Best Music Pinakamahusay na Musika	Best Sound Pinakamahusay na Tunog
**Leonor Will Never Die**; Blue Room; Nocebo	**Nocebo**; Blue Room; Deleter; Ginhawa; Leonor Will Never Die; Nanahimik ang Gabi; The Baseball Player
Best Short Film Pinakamahusay na Maikling Pelikula	Best Documentary Pinakamahusay na Dokyumentaryo
**Sa Paglupad Ka Banog**	**11,103**

== Special award ==
=== Natatanging Gawad Urian ===
- Jaime Francisco García Fábregas

== Multiple nominations and awards ==
Films that received multiple nominations
Nominations	Films
10	Blue Room
10	Leonor Will Never Die
9	Kapag Wala nang Mga Alon
7	Nocebo
6	12 Weeks
5	Deleter
4	The Baseball Player
3	Ginhawa
2	Family Matters
2	Plan 75

Films that won multiple awards
Awards	Film
4	Kapag Wala nang Mga Alon
4	Leonor Will Never Die
2	12 Weeks
