= 27th Gawad Urian Awards =

2009 Philippine film awards ceremony

- Date: June 19, 2004
- Site: AFP Theater; Camp Aguinaldo; Quezon City

Highlights
- Best Picture: Babae sa Breakwater; Magnifico
- Most awards: Magnifico (7)
- Most nominations: Magnifico (15)

The 27th Gawad Urian Awards (Filipino: Ika-27 na Gawad Urian) is held on June 19, 2004. It honors the best Philippine films of 2003. The event is held at AFP Theater of Camp Aguinaldo in Quezon City. It is hosted by Janno Gibbs, Michael V. and Pia Guanio.

The Natatanging Gawad Urian, equivalent to a Lifetime Achievement Award, is presented to the veteran actress Gloria Romero, who also wins the Best Supporting Actress award for her role in Magnifico. Jiro Manio wins the Best Actor award for his role in Magnifico. At twelve years old, he is the youngest actor to win this accolade.

== Winners and nominees ==
Winners are listed first and bolded.

| Best Picture Pinakamahusay na Pelikula | Best Director Pinakamahusay na Direksyon |
|---|---|
| **Babae sa Breakwater**; **Magnifico**; Bridal Shower; Crying Ladies | **Magnifico** **– Maryo J. de los Reyes**; Babae sa Breakwater – Mario O'Hara; Bridal Shower – Jeffrey Jeturian; Crying Ladies – Mark Meily; Malikmata – Jose Javier Reyes |
| Best Actor Pinakamahusay na Pangunahing Aktor | Best Actress Pinakamahusay na Pangunahing Aktres |
| **Jiro Manio** – **Magnifico**; Aga Muhlach – Kung Ako na Lang Sana; Cogie Domingo – Anghel sa Lupa; Kristoffer King – Babae sa Breakwater | **Cherry Pie Picache – Bridal Shower**; Ara Mina – Ang Huling Birhen sa Lupa; Dina Bonnevie – Bridal Shower; Elizabeth Oropesa – Homecoming; Katherine Luna – Babae sa Breakwater; Maricel Soriano – Filipinas |
| Best Supporting Actor Pinakamahusay na Pangalawang Aktor | Best Supporting Actress Pinakamahusay na Pangalawang Aktres |
| **Albert Martinez – Magnifico**; Alfred Vargas – Bridal Shower; Eric Quizon – Crying Ladies; Jericho Rosales – Noon at Ngayon; Julio Pacheco – Crying Ladies; Mark Gil – Magnifico; Victor Neri – Filipinas | **Gloria Romero – Magnifico**; Celia Rodriguez – Magnifico; Girlie Sevilla – Magnifico; Hilda Koronel – Crying Ladies; Isabelle de Leon – Magnifico; Lorna Tolentino – Magnifico; Mickey Ferriols – Kung Ako na Lang Sana; Sherry Lara – Crying Ladies |
| Best Screenplay Pinakamahusay na Dulang Pampelikula | Best Cinematography Pinakamahusay na Sinematograpiya |
| **Magnifico** **– Michiko Yamamoto**; Babae sa Breakwater – Mario O'Hara; Bridal Shower – Chris Martinez; Crying Ladies – Mark Meily | **Crying Ladies** – Lee Meily; Babae sa Breakwater – Rey de Leon; Bridal Shower – Katrina Holigores & Nap Jamir; Magnifico – Odyssey Flores; Malikmata – Regiben Romana & Lito Mempin |
| Best Production Design Pinakamahusay na Disenyong Pamproduksyon | Best Editing Pinakamahusay na Editing |
| **Babae sa Breakwater** **– Koko Teodoro**; Bridal Shower – Raymond Bajarias; Crying Ladies – Norman Regalado; Magnifico – Gerry Santos | **Bridal Shower – Tara Illenberger**; Babae sa Breakwater – Robert Vasadre; Crying Ladies – Danny Anonuevo; Magnifico – Manet A. Dayrit; Malikmata – Vito Cajili |
| Best Music Pinakamahusay na Musika | Best Sound Pinakamahusay na Tunog |
| **Babae sa Breakwater** **– Jesse Lucas**; Bridal Shower – Jesse Lucas; Crying Ladies – Vincent de Jesus; Filipinas – Jesse Lucas; Malikmata – Francis Guevarra & Ferdie Marquez | **Magnifico** – **Arnold Reodica**; Babae sa Breakwater – Leody Maralit; Bridal Shower – Arnold Reodica; Crying Ladies – Raffy Magsaysay; Malikmata – Albert Michael Idioma |

== Special Award ==
=== Natatanging Gawad Urian ===
- Gloria Romero

=== Best Short Film ===
- Liyab by Sockie Fernandez
