= 35th Gawad Urian Awards =

Award ceremony for Philippine films of 2023

- Date: June 13, 2012
- Site: AFP Theater, Camp Aguinaldo, Quezon City
- Hosted by: Venus Raj, Angel Aquino, Butch Francisco & Zoren Legaspi

Highlights
- Best Picture: Ang Sayaw ng Dalawang Kaliwang Paa
- Most awards: Ang Sayaw ng Dalawang Kaliwang Paa (7)
- Most nominations: Amok (10)

The 35th Gawad Urian Awards (Filipino: Ika-35 na Gawad Urian) is held on June 13, 2012. Established in 1976, the Gawad Urian Awards highlights the best of Philippine cinema as decided by the Filipino Film Critics. The best Philippine films for the year 2011 are honored in a ceremony at the AFP Theater, Camp Aguinaldo in Quezon City. Veteran cinematographer Rody Lacap, who has won the Gawad Urian for Best Cinematography five times, is honored with the Lifetime Achievement Award (Natatanging Gawad Urian Award).

== Winners and nominees ==
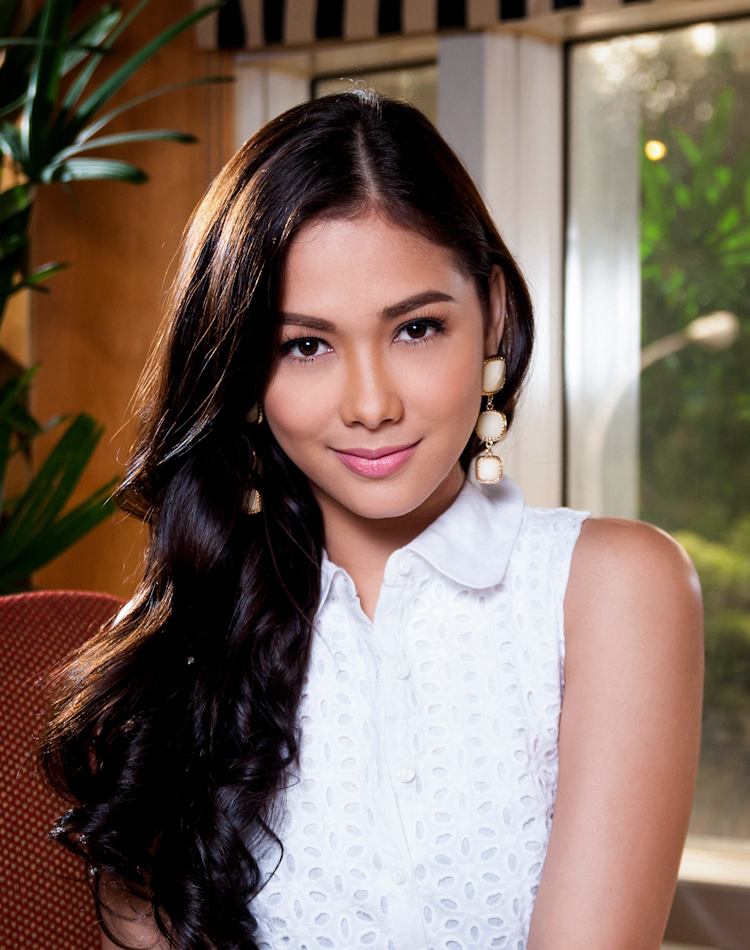
Maja Salvador is a first-time Best Actress winner for her role in Thelma.

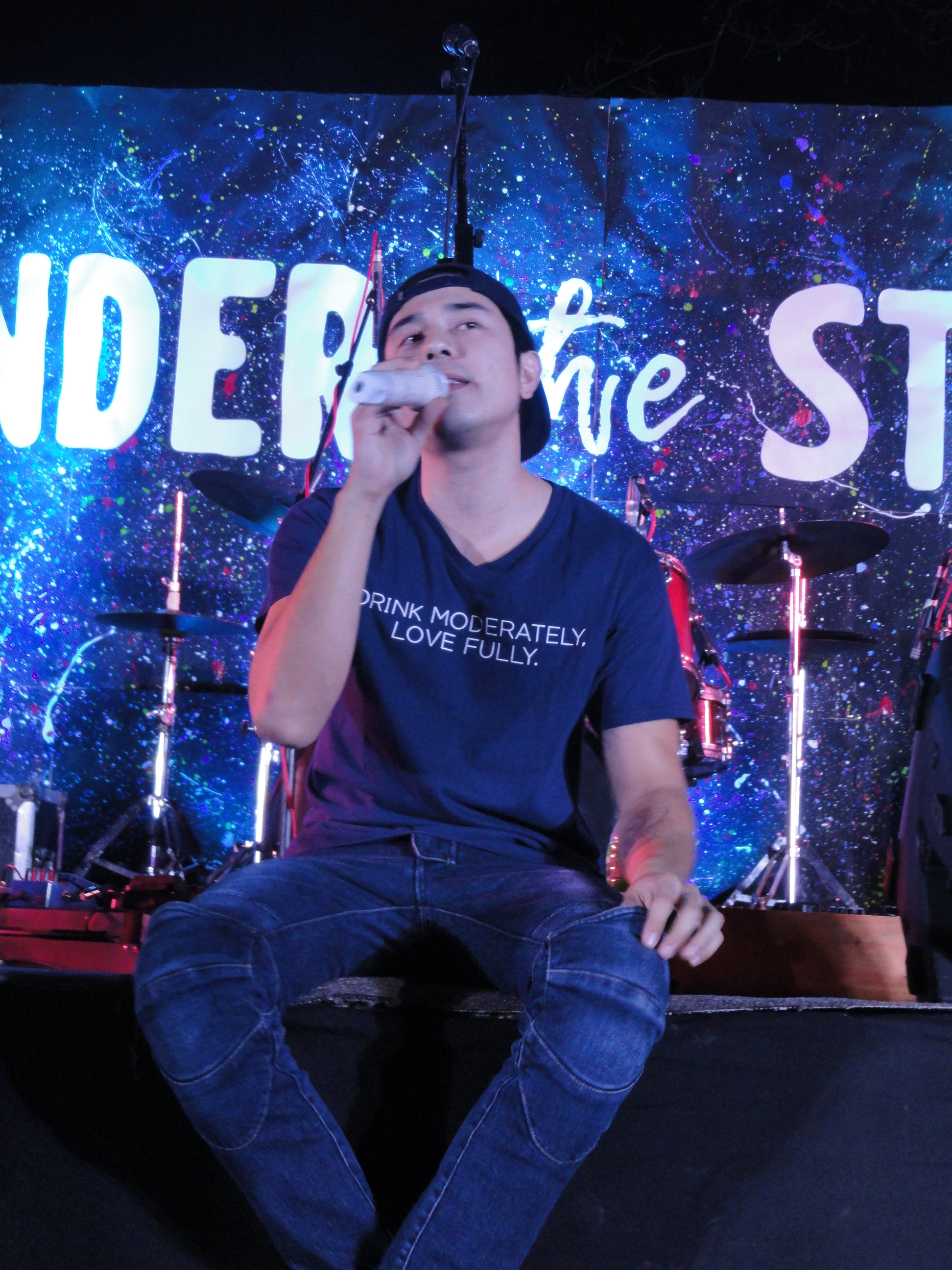
Paulo Avelino bags the Best Actor award for his role in the indie film, Ang Sayaw ng Dalawang Kaliwang Paa.

Winners are listed first and bolded.

Best Picture Pinakamahusay na Pelikula	Best Director Pinakamahusay na Direksyon
**Ang Sayaw ng Dalawang Kaliwang Paa**; Amok; Ang Babae sa Septic Tank; Bisperas; Boundary; Busong; Ka Oryang; Niño; Six Degrees of Separation from Lilia Cuntapay; The Natural Phenomenon of Madness	**Alvin Yapan – Ang Sayaw ng Dalawang Kaliwang Paa**; Antoinette Jadaone – Six Degrees of Separation from Lilia Cuntapay; Auraeus Solito – Busong; Benito Bautista – Boundary; Jeffrey Jeturian – Bisperas; Lawrence Fajardo – Amok; Loy Arcenas – Niño; Marlon Rivera – Ang Babae sa Septic Tank; Sari Lluch Dalena – Ka Oryang
Best Actor Pinakamahusay na Pangunahing Aktor	Best Actress Pinakamahusay na Pangunahing Aktres
**Paulo Avelino – Ang Sayaw ng Dalawang Kaliwang Paa**; Alfred Vargas – Teoriya; Bong Cabrera – Sa Ilalim ng Tulay; Jess Mendoza – The Natural Phenomenon of Madness; JM de Guzman – Ang Babae sa Septic Tank; Kean Cipriano – Ang Babae sa Septic Tank; Martin Escudero – Zombadings 1: Patayin sa Shokot si Remington; Raymond Bagatsing – Boundary; Ronnie Lazaro – Boundary; Tirso Cruz III – Bisperas; TJ Trinidad – Deadline	**Maja Salvador – Thelma**; Alessandra de Rossi – Ka Oryang; Cherry Pie Picache – Isda; Diana Zubiri – Bahay Bata; Eugene Domingo – Ang Babae sa Septic Tank; Fides Cuyugan-Asensio – Niño; Lilia Cuntapay – Six Degrees of Separation from Lilia Cuntapay; Maria Isabel Lopez – Cuchera; Opaline Santos – The Natural Phenomenon of Madness; Raquel Villavicencio – Bisperas
Best Supporting Actor Pinakamahusay na Pangalawang Aktor	Best Supporting Actress Pinakamahusay na Pangalawang Aktres
**Art Acuña – Niño**; Bembol Roco – Isda; Dido de la Paz – Amok; Gary Lim – Amok; Jake Cuenca – In the Name of Love; Joem Bascon – Ka Oryang; John Regala – Manila Kingpin: The Asiong Salonga Story; Jojit Lorenzo – Anatomiya ng Korupsyon; Mark Gil – Amok; Marvin Agustin – Patikul; Ronnie Lazaro – Manila Kingpin: The Asiong Salonga Story	**Jean Garcia – Ang Sayaw ng Dalawang Kaliwang Paa**; Angeli Bayani – Ka Oryang; Julia Clarete – Bisperas; Shamaine Buencamino – Niño; Solenn Heussaff – Yesterday, Today, Tomorrow
Best Screenplay Pinakamahusay na Dulang Pampelikula	Best Cinematography Pinakamahusay na Sinematograpiya
**Ang Sayaw ng Dalawang Kaliwang Paa**; Amok; Ang Babae sa Septic Tank; Bisperas; Deadline; Ka Oryang; Niño; Six Degrees of Separation from Lilia Cuntapay; The Natural Phenomenon of Madness	**Ang Sayaw ng Dalawang Kaliwang Paa**; Amok; Bisperas; Busong; Ka Oryang; Liberacion; Manila Kingpin: The Asiong Salonga Story; Sakay sa Hangin
Best Production Design Pinakamahusay na Disenyong Pamproduksyon	Best Editing Pinakamahusay na Editing
**The Natural Phenomenon of Madness**; Amok; Ang Babae sa Septic Tank; Bisperas; Manila Kingpin: The Asiong Salonga Story; Niño; Sakay sa Hangin; Six Degrees of Separation from Lilia Cuntapay	**Amok**; Ang Babae sa Septic Tank; Ang Sayaw ng Dalawang Kaliwang Paa; Busong; Ka Oryang; Niño; Six Degrees of Separation from Lilia Cuntapay
Best Music Pinakamahusay na Musika	Best Sound Pinakamahusay na Tunog
**Ang Sayaw ng Dalawang Kaliwang Paa**; Amok; Busong; Ka Oryang; Niño; Sakay sa Hangin	**Amok**; Ang Babae sa Septic Tank; Bisperas; Boundary; Liberacion; Manila Kingpin: The Asiong Salonga Story
Best Short Film Pinakamahusay na Maikling Pelikula	Best Documentary Pinakamahusay na Dokyumentaryo
**Sirip**; Ang Gugma ni Olivia; Bells Ring, Mr. King; Intolerance; Katipunan; Labing Dalawa; Liyab; Renek; Walang Katapusang Kwarto; Winner Winner	**Tundong Magiliw: Pasaan Isinisilang Siyang Mahirap?**; Agos; Working While in Class

== Special Award ==
=== Natatanging Gawad Urian ===
- Rody Lacap

== Multiple nominations and awards ==
Films that received multiple nominations
Nominations	Films
11	Amok
9	Ang Babae sa Septic Tank
9	Bisperas
9	Ka Oryang
9	Niño
8	Ang Sayaw ng Dalawang Kaliwang Paa
6	Six Degrees of Separation from Lilia Cuntapay
5	Boundary
5	Busong
5	Manila Kingpin: The Asiong Salonga Story
5	The Natural Phenomenon of Madness
3	Sakay sa Hangin
2	Deadline
2	Isda
2	Liberacion

Films that won multiple awards
Awards	Film
7	Ang Sayaw ng Dalawang Kaliwang Paa
2	Amok
