= 36th Gawad Urian Awards =

Award ceremony for Philippine films of 2023

- Date: June 18, 2013
- Site: NBC Tent, Bonifacio Global City
- Hosted by: Richard Gomez, Cherie Gil, Butch Francisco, Iza Calzado & Xian Lim

Highlights
- Best Picture: Ang Paglalakbay ng Mga Bituin sa Gabing Madilim
- Most awards: Thy Womb (2)
- Most nominations: Baybayin (10)

The 36th Gawad Urian Awards (Filipino: Ika-36 na Gawad Urian) is held on June 18, 2013. Established in 1976, the Gawad Urian Awards highlights the best of Philippine cinema as decided by the Filipino Film Critics. The best Philippine films for the year 2012 are honored in the event at the NBC Tent in Bonifacio Global City. Alessandra de Rossi sets a record for this awards season as the first performer to be nominated three times in one year: Best Actress for Baybayin, and Best Supporting Actress for Mater Dolorosa and Sta. Niña.

== Winners and nominees ==
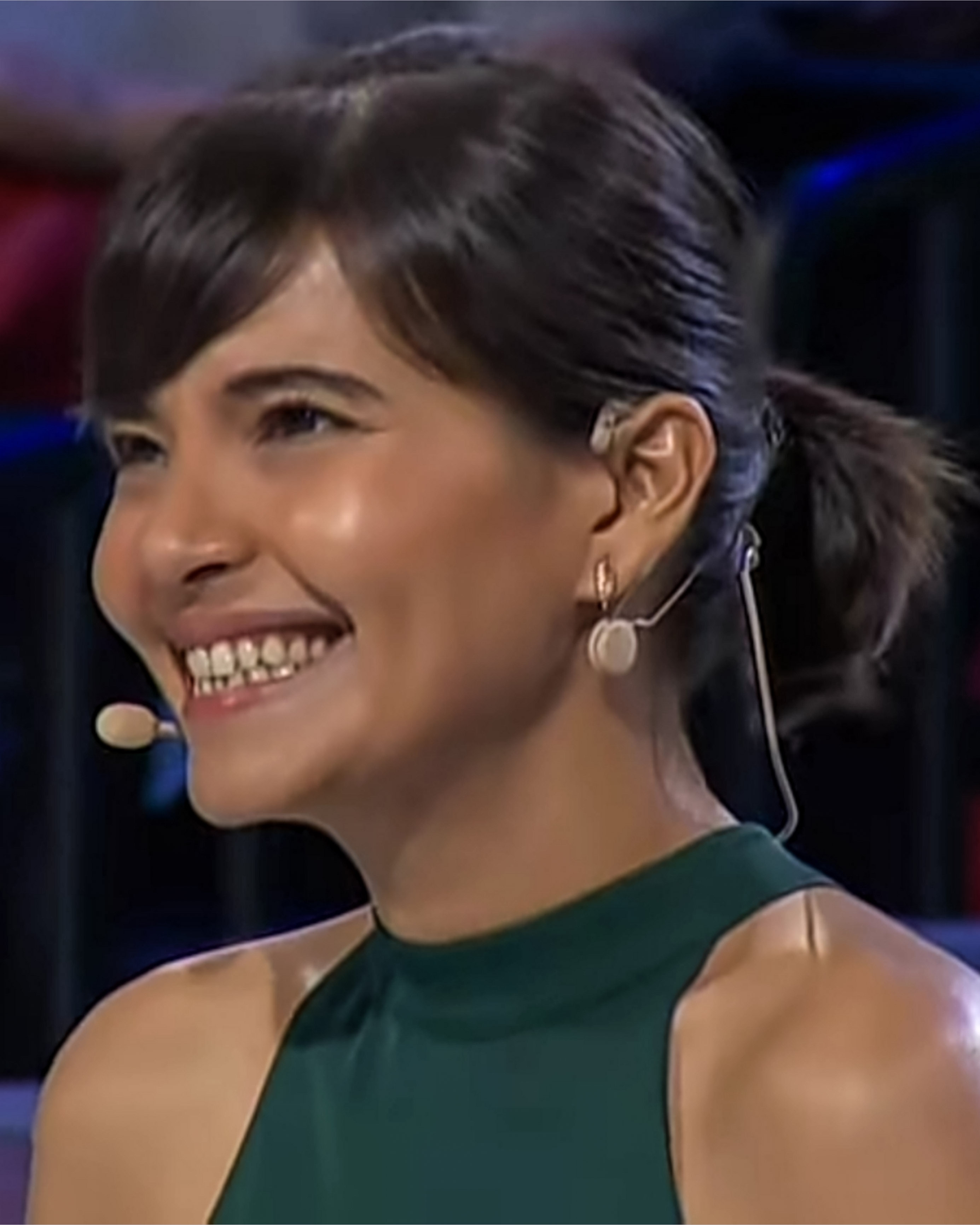
Alessandra de Rossi is nominated for three different performances this year, a first in the history of the Gawad Urian. She wins for her supporting role in Sta. Niña.

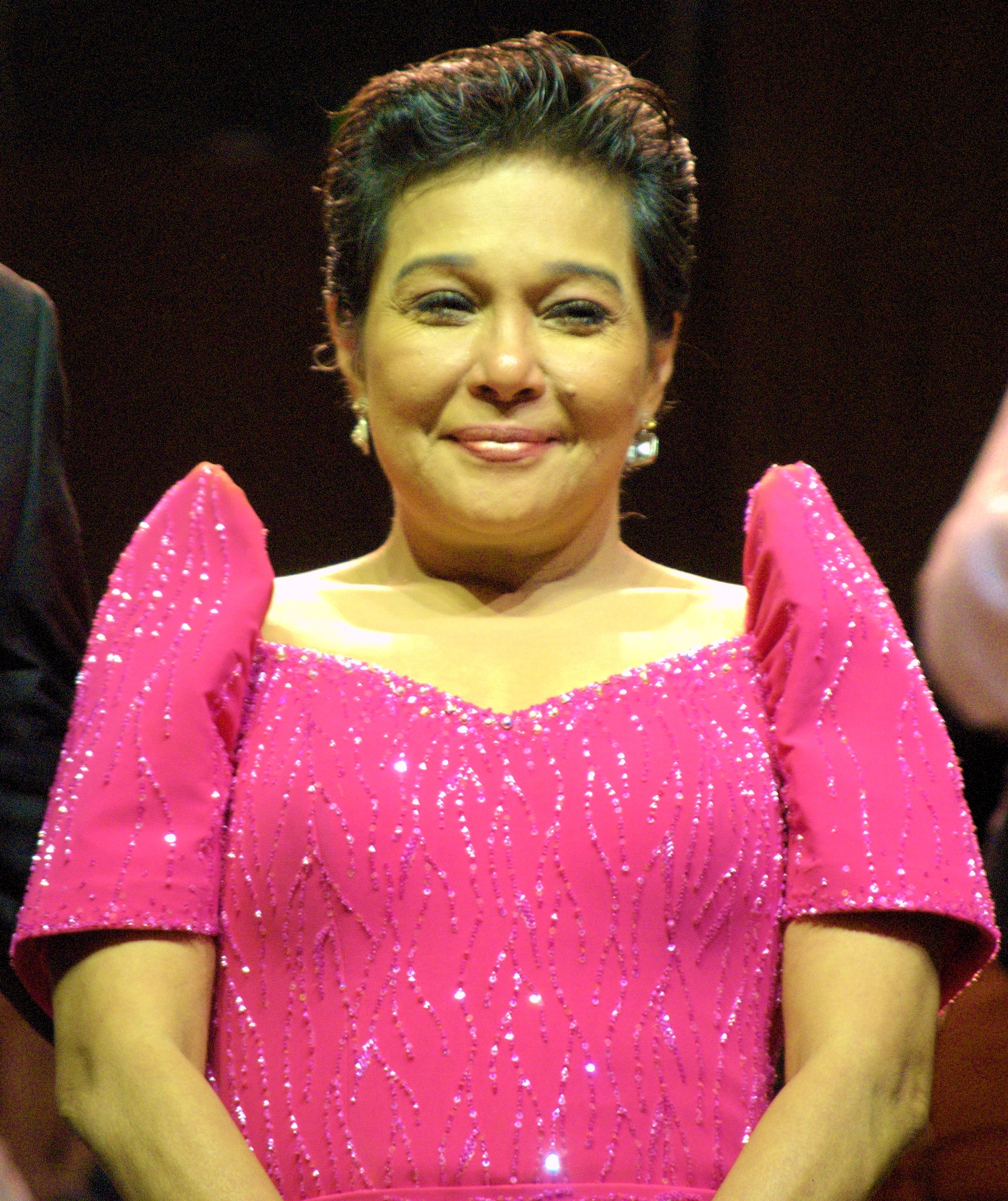
Nora Aunor claims her 7th Gawad Urian Best Actress award out of 21 nominations for her role in Thy Womb.

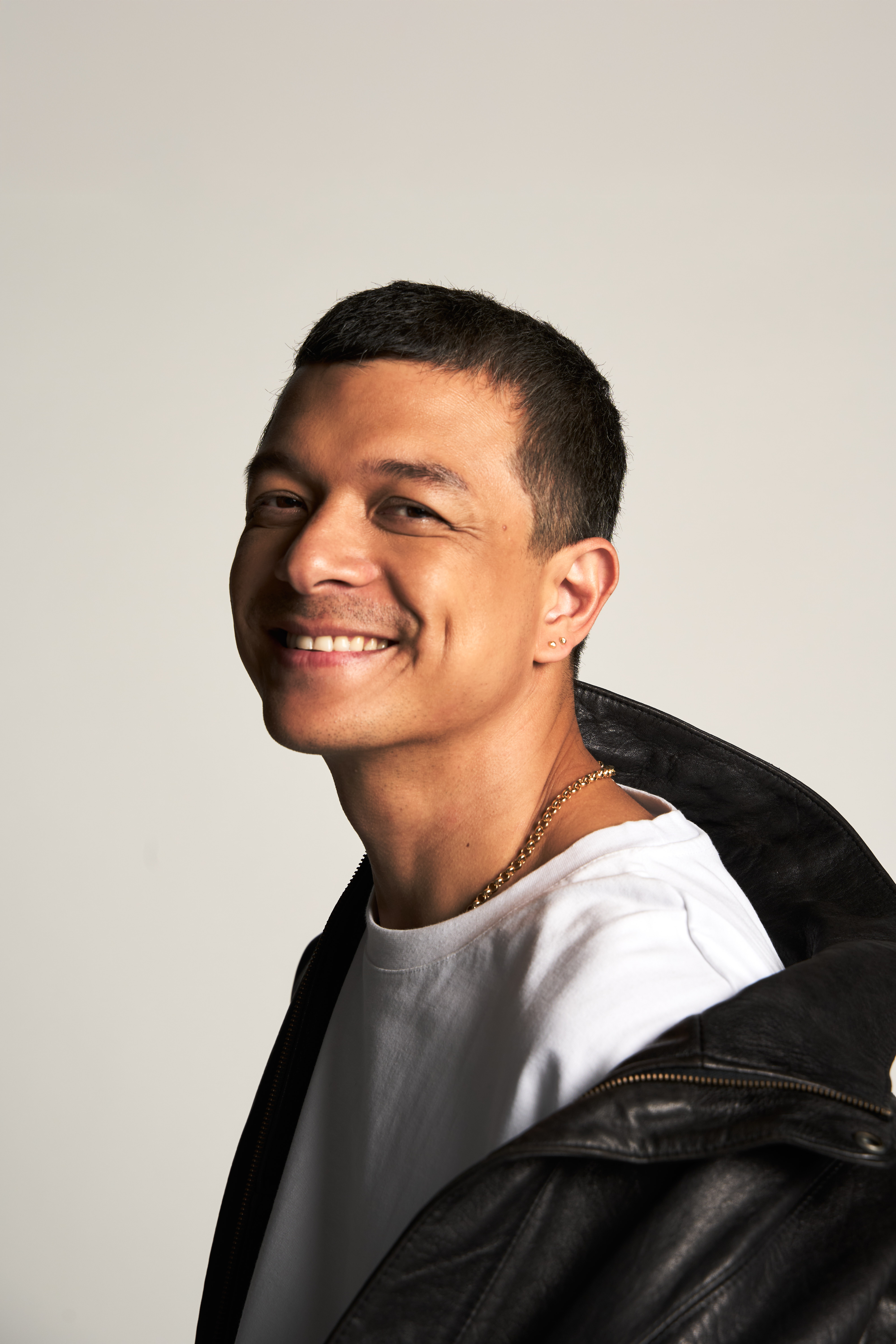
Jericho Rosales bags the Best Actor award for his role in Alagwa.

Winners are listed first and bolded.

Best Picture Pinakamahusay na Pelikula	Best Director Pinakamahusay na Direksyon
**Ang Paglalakbay ng Mga Bituin sa Gabing Madilim**; Baybayin; Bwakaw; Colossal; Diablo; Florentina Hubaldo, CTE; Mater Dolorosa; Oros; Posas; Thy Womb	**Adolfo Alix Jr. – Mater Dolorosa**; Arnel Mardoquio – Ang Paglalakbay ng Mga Bituin sa Gabing Madilim; Auraeus Solito – Baybayin; Brillante Mendoza – Thy Womb; Ian Loreños – Alagwa; Jun Lana – Bwakaw; Lav Diaz – Florentina Hubaldo, CTE; Lawrence Fajardo – Posas; Manny Palo – Sta. Niña; Maribel Legarda – Melodrama Negra; Mes de Guzman – Diablo; Paul Sta. Ana – Oros; Sigfreid Barros-Sanchez & Racquel Zaballero-Sanchez – Huling Biyahe; Whammy Alcazaren – Colossal
Best Actor Pinakamahusay na Pangunahing Aktor	Best Actress Pinakamahusay na Pangunahing Aktres
**Jericho Rosales** **– Alagwa**; Adrian Sebastian – Baybayin; Ananda Everingham – Kalayaan; Anthony Falcon – Requieme; Bembol Roco – Thy Womb; Coco Martin – Sta. Niña; Deul Raynon Ladia – Anac ti Pating; Dominic Roco – Ang Nawawala; Eddie Garcia – Bwakaw; JM de Guzman – Intoy Syokoy ng Kalye Marino; Joem Bascon – Qwerty; Kristoffer King – Oros; Nico Antonio – Posas	**Nora Aunor – Thy Womb**; Alessandra de Rossi – Baybayin; Ama Quiambao – Diablo; Assunta de Rossi – Baybayin; Gina Alajar – Mater Dolorosa; Jodi Sta. Maria – Aparisyon; Liza Diño – In Nomine Matris; Olga Natividad – Mga Dayo; Shamaine Buencamino – Requieme
Best Supporting Actor Pinakamahusay na Pangalawang Aktor	Best Supporting Actress Pinakamahusay na Pangalawang Aktres
**Art Acuña – Posas**; Carlo Aquino – Mater Dolorosa; Dax Alejandro – Qwerty; Joross Gamboa – Intoy Syokoy ng Kalye Marino	**Alessandra de Rossi – Sta. Niña**; Alessandra de Rossi – Mater Dolorosa; Annicka Dolonius – Ang Nawawala; Clara Ramona – In Nomine Matris; Joy Viado – MNL 143; Mylene Dizon – Aparisyon; Raquel Villavicencio – Aparisyon
Best Screenplay Pinakamahusay na Dulang Pampelikula	Best Cinematography Pinakamahusay na Sinematograpiya
**Diablo**; Alagwa; Ang Paglalakbay ng Mga Bituin sa Gabing Madilim; Bwakaw; Colossal; Florentina Hubaldo, CTE; Huling Biyahe; Mater Dolorosa; Melodrama Negra; MNL 143; Oros; Posas; The Animals; Thy Womb	**Colossal**; Ang Nawawala; Ang Paglalakbay ng Mga Bituin sa Gabing Madilim; Baybayin; Bwakaw; Diablo; Florentina Hubaldo, CTE; Intoy Syokoy ng Kalye Marino; Kalayaan; Mater Dolorosa; Oros; Posas; Sta. Niña; The Animals; Thy Womb
Best Production Design Pinakamahusay na Disenyong Pamproduksyon	Best Editing Pinakamahusay na Editing
**Thy Womb**; Baybayin; Bwakaw; Intoy Syokoy ng Kalye Marino; Mater Dolorosa; Oros; Qiyamah; Sta. Niña	**Kalayaan**; Alagwa; Ang Nawawala; Baybayin; Florentina Hubaldo, CTE; Mater Dolorosa; MNL 143; Oros; Thy Womb
Best Music Pinakamahusay na Musika	Best Sound Pinakamahusay na Tunog
**Baybayin**; Ang Nawawala; The Animals; Thy Womb	**Florentina Hubaldo, CTE**; Baybayin; Colossal; Kalayaan; MNL 143; Posas; Qiyamah
Best Short Film Pinakamahusay na Maikling Pelikula	Best Documentary Pinakamahusay na Dokyumentaryo
**Ritmo**; 5:00 ning Gatpanapun; Bayi sa Aparador; Bohe: Sons of the Waves; I Am Patience; Manenaya; Pagpag; Para kay Ama; Pukpok; Ruweda; Sarong Aldaw; Talamitan; Ulian	**Harana**; Ang Pagbabalik ng Bituin; Dere sa Amo sa San Antonio; Give Up Tomorrow; Guerrera: Warrior Women; Himala Ngayon; Obscured Histories and Silent Longings of Daguluan's Children; Paglalayag; Pureza: The Story of Negros Sugar; Puso ng Lungsod; Sa Rikaw; Taguri: The Kites of Sulu

== Special Award ==
=== Natatanging Gawad Urian ===
- Mila del Sol

== Multiple nominations and awards ==
Films that received multiple nominations
Nominations	Films
10	Baybayin
9	Mater Dolorosa
9	Thy Womb
7	Oros
7	Posas
6	Bwakaw
6	Florentina Hubaldo, CTE
5	Ang Nawawala
5	Colossal
5	Diablo
5	Sta. Niña
4	Alagwa
4	Ang Paglalakbay ng mga Bituin sa Gabing Madilim
4	Intoy Syokoy ng Kalye Marino
4	Kalayaan
4	MNL 143
3	Aparisyon
3	The Animals
2	Huling Biyahe
2	In Nomine Matris
2	Melodrama Negra
2	Qiyamah
2	Qwerty

Films that won multiple awards
Awards	Film
2	Thy Womb
