= 28th Gawad Urian Awards =

2009 Philippine film awards ceremony

- Date: June 4, 2005
- Site: AFP Theater; Camp Aguinaldo; Quezon City

Highlights
- Best Picture: Panaghoy sa Suba
- Most awards: Panaghoy sa Suba (6)
- Most nominations: Panaghoy sa Suba (9)

The 28th Gawad Urian Awards (Filipino: Ika-30 na Gawad Urian) is held on June 4, 2005. It honors the best Philippine films of 2004. Dominated mostly by independent films, the ceremony was hosted by lPia Guanio, Michael V. and Janno Gibbs held at AFP Theater of Camp Aguinaldo in Quezon City.

Panaghoy sa Suba dominated the ceremony with 6 awards including Best Picture, Best Director and Best Actor, out of 11 nominations. The event ceremony was broadcast by RPN 9. Established in 1976, the Gawad Urian Awards highlights the best of Philippine cinema as decided by the Filipino Film Critics.

== Winners and nominees ==
Winners are listed first and bolded.

Best Picture Pinakamahusay na Pelikula	Best Director Pinakamahusay na Direksyon
**(Tied between) Panaghoy sa Suba – CM Films Inc. and** **Ebolusyon ng Isang Pamilyng Pilipino - Paul Tanedo, producer**; Milan - Star Cinema Productions, Inc.; Panaghoy sa Suba - CM Films, Inc.; Sabel - Regal Entertainment, Inc.	**Cesar Montano– Panaghoy sa Suba**; Lav Diaz - Ebolusyon ng Isang Pamilyang Pilipino; Joel Lamangan - Sabel; Olivia Lamasan - Milan
Best Actor Pinakamahusay na Pangunahing Aktor	Best Actress Pinakamahusay na Pangunahing Aktres
**Cesar Montano** - Panaghoy sa Suba; Ronnie Lazaro - Ebolusyon ng Isang Pamilyang Pilipino; Pen Medina - Ebolusyonng Isang Pamilyang Pilipino; Piolo Pascual - Milan; Yul Servo - Naglalayag; Jomari Yllana - Minsan Pa	**Judy Ann Santos** - Sabel; Nora Aunor - Naglalayag; Claudine Barretto - Milan; Vilma Santos - Mano Po 3; My Love
Best Supporting Actor Pinakamahusay na Pangalawang Aktor	Best Supporting Actress Pinakamahusay na Pangalawang Aktres
**Wendell Ramos – Sabel**; Roeder Camanag - Ebolusyon ng Isang Pamilyang Pilipino; Dennis Trillo - Aishite Masu: 1941 Mahal Kita; Jacky Woo - Panaghoy sa Suba	**Iza Calzado – Sigaw**; Aleck Bovick - Naglalayag; Angie Ferro - Ebolusyon ng Isang Pamilyang Pilipino; Rebecca Lusterio - Panaghoy sa Suba; Ara Mina - Minsan Pa; Julian Palermo - Panaghoy sa Suba
Best Screenplay Pinakamahusay na Dulang Pampelikula	Best Cinematography Pinakamahusay na Sinematograpiya
**Lav Diaz – Ebolusyon ng Isang Pamilyang Pilipino**; Raymond Lee and Olivia Lamasan - Milan; Ricardo Lee - Sabel; Cris Vertido - Panaghoy sa Suba	**Panaghoy sa Suba – Ely Cruz**; Bahaghari, Larry Manda and Paul Tanedo - Ebolusyon ng Isang Pamilyang Pilipino; Shayne Clemente - Milan; Ja Tadena - Pa-siyam
Best Production Design Pinakamahusay na Disenyong Pamproduksyon	Best Editing Pinakamahusay na Editing
**Ebolusyon ng Isang Pamilyang Pilipino – Patty Eustaquio, Rishab and Jun Sabayton**; Allan Leyres and Ron Heritan - Panaghoy; Richard Somes - Pa-siyam	**Marya Ignacio – Milan**; Jason, Cahapay - Pa-siyam; Vito Cajili - Feng Shui; Renato de Leon - Panaghoy sa Suba
Best Music Pinakamahusay na Musika	Best Sound Pinakamahusay na Tunog
**Nonong Buencamino – Panaghoy sa Suba**; Lucien Lataba and Arnel de Pano - Minsan Pa; Jesse Lucas - Sabel	**Panaghoy sa Suba – Angie Reyes and Nestor Mutia**; Albert Michael Idioma - Feng Shui; Rafael Luna and Bob Macabenta - Ebolusyon ng Isang Pamilyang Pilipino; Arnold Reodica - Sigaw; Ramon Reyes - Pa-siyam

== Special Award ==
=== Natatanging Gawad Urian ===
- Jess Navarro

=== Best Short Film ===
- Bunso: The Youngest', directed by Ditsi Carolino
