= 30th Gawad Urian Awards =

2009 Philippine film awards ceremony

- Date: September 13, 2007
- Site: Henry Lee Irwin Theater Quezon City

Highlights
- Best Picture: Kubrador
- Most awards: Kubrador (5)
- Most nominations: Kubrador (10)

The 30th Gawad Urian Awards (Filipino: Ika-30 na Gawad Urian) is held on September 13, 2007. It honors the best Philippine films of 2006. Dominated mostly by independent films, the ceremony was hosted by Regine Velasquez and Janno Gibbs held at Henry Lee Irwin Theater of Ateneo de Manila University in Quezon City.

Kubrador dominated the ceremony with 5 awards including Best Picture, Best Director and Best Actress, out of 11 nominations. Established in 1976, the Gawad Urian Awards highlights the best of Philippine cinema as decided by the Filipino Film Critics.

== Winners and nominees ==
Winners are listed first and bolded.

| Best Picture Pinakamahusay na Pelikula | Best Director Pinakamahusay na Direksyon |
|---|---|
| **Kubrador – MLR Films**; Huling Balyan ng Buhi; Kasal, Kasali, Kasalo; Kaleldo; Manoro; Rome & Juliet; Todos, Todos, Teros | **Jeffrey Jeturian– Kubrador**; Brillante Mendoza - Kaleldo and Manoro; Connie Macatuno - Rome & Juliet; Jose Javier Reyes - Kasal, Kasali, Kasalo; John Torres - Todos, Todos, Teros; Joel Lamangan - ZsaZsa Zaturnnah Ze Moveeh; Sherad Anthony Sanchez - Huling Balyan ng Buhi |
| Best Actor Pinakamahusay na Pangunahing Aktor | Best Actress Pinakamahusay na Pangunahing Aktres |
| **(tied between) Mark Gil** - '**Rotonda** and **Rustom Padilla** - **ZsaZsa Zaturnnah**; Ryan Agoncillo - Kasal, Kasali, Kasalo; Alchris Galura - Batad Sa Daang Palay; Mario Magalona - Rekados; Jett Pangan - Tulad ng Dati; Sid Lucero - Donsol | **Gina Pareño** - **Kubrador**; Maricel Soriano - Inang Yaya; Judy Ann Santos - Kasal, Kasali, Kasalo; Cherry Pie Picache - Kaleldo; Angel Aquino - Kaleldo; Jonalyn Ablong - Manoro; Mylene Dizon - Rome & Juliet; Andrea del Rosario - Rome & Juliet |
| Best Supporting Actor Pinakamahusay na Pangalawang Aktor | Best Supporting Actress Pinakamahusay na Pangalawang Aktres |
| **Rafael Rosell – Romeo & Juliet**; Ping Medina - Tulad ng Dati; Allan Paule - Kaleldo; Lauren Novero - Kaleldo; Archie Adamos - Raket ni Nanay; Jeffrey Quizon - Rotonda; Soliman Cruz - Kasal, Kasali, Kasalo; Domingo Landicho - Kubrador | **Meryll Soriano – Rotonda**; Liza Lorena - Inang Yaya; Gloria Diaz - Kasal, Kasali, Kasalo; Tala Santos - Inang Yaya; Tessie Tomas - Rome & Juliet; Agot Isidro - Tulad ng Dati; Gina Pareño - Kasal, Kasali, Kasalo; Pops Fernandez - ZsaZsa Zaturnnah |
| Best Screenplay Pinakamahusay na Dulang Pampelikula | Best Cinematography Pinakamahusay na Sinematograpiya |
| **Connie Macatono and Cris Violago – Romeo & Juliet**; Huling Balyan ng Lahi; Kaleldo; Kasal, Kasali, Kasalo; Kubrador; Manoro; Todos, Todos, Teros; Zsa Zsa Zaturnnah | **Kubrador – Boy Yniquez**; Kaleldo; Huling Balyan ng Lahi; Manoro, Pamana; Raket ni Nanay; Rome & Juliet; Rotonda |
| Best Production Design Pinakamahusay na Disenyong Pamproduksyon | Best Editing Pinakamahusay na Editing |
| **Kubrador – Leo Abaya**; Kaleldo; Kubrador; Huling Balyan ng Lahi; Manoro; Rome and Juliet; Rotonda; Zsa Zsa Zaturnnah | **Todos, Todos, Teros – John Torres**; Kasal, Kasali, Kasalo; Kaleldo; Kubrador; Pamana; Rome & Juliet; Rotonda |
| Best Music Pinakamahusay na Musika | Best Sound Pinakamahusay na Tunog |
| **Zsazsa Zaturnnah Ze Moveeh – Vincent de Jesus**; Huling Balyan ng Buhi; Kaleldo; Kubrador; Manoro; Tulad ng Dati | **Tulad ng Dati – Ronald de Asis**; Kaleldo; Kubrador; Raket ni Nanay; Tulad ng Dati; Zsa ZsaZaturnnah |

== Special Award ==
=== Natatanging Gawad Urian ===
- Marichu "Manay Ichu" Maceda

=== Best Short Film ===
- Putot, directed by Jake Cogama
