= Qwerty (film) =

- Directed by: Bill Sebastian
- Written by: Juliet McDaniel
- Produced by: Nat Dykeman; Jeremy Truelove
- Starring: Dana Pupkin; Eric Hailey; Bill Redding; J.W. Dean; Claire Tuft; Katherine Banks; Eliza Toser; Jake Jarvi; Rebecca Lumianski; T'Challa Dion Jackson
- Cinematography: David Wagenaar
- Edited by: Bill Sebastian; Clinton Noel Williams
- Music by: Bruce Chianese; Ricardo Veiga
- Production company: Intentional Films
- Release date: 12 April 2012 (Kansas City FilmFest International)
- Running time: 90 minutes
- Country: United States
- Language: English

Qwerty (stylized Q.W.E.R.T.Y.) is a 2012 American romantic comedy film directed by Bill Sebastian, starring Dana Pupkin, Eric Hailey, Bill Redding, J.W. Dean, Claire Tuft, Katherine Banks, Eliza Toser, Jake Jarvi, Rebecca Lumianski and T'Challa Dion Jackson.

== Cast ==
- Dana Pupkin as Zoe
- Eric Hailey as Marty
- Bill Redding as Lewis
- J.W. Dean as Dirk
- Claire Tuft as Katie
- Katherine Banks as Holly
- Eliza Toser as Amber
- Jake Jarvi as Jake
- Rebecca Lumianski as Mitsy Dugan
- T'Challa Dion Jackson as Parker Smith
- Mike McNamara as Ken
- Jeff Garretson as Johnathan
- Kate Froehlich as Lizzie
- Dan Flannery as Bob
- Diana Simonzadeh as Virginia
- Sandy Gulliver as Nancy

== Reception ==
Roger Ebert of the Chicago Sun-Times rated the film 3 stars out of 4 and called it "charming, winning and sweet".

Christine N. Ziemba of Paste gave the film a score of 4/10 and wrote that it "lacks both romance and laughs, largely due to a clunky script, stilted supporting performances and an unappealing leading character."

Matt Pais of the Chicago Tribune rated the film 1.5 stars out of 4 and wrote that it "possesses a pretty warped perception of behavior that could be regarded as charming."

Qwerty screened at over 20 film festivals, and won numerous awards, including an Honorable Mention for & Best Use Of Music In Film at the Nashville Film Festival.
