= Kailan Mahuhugasan ang Kasalanan? =

1989 melodrama film by Lino Brocka

- Theatrical release poster
- Directed by: Lino Brocka
- Screenplay by: Jose Y. Dalisay Jr.
- Story by: Salvador M. Royales
- Produced by: Charo Santos-Concio
- Starring: Lorna Tolentino; Richard Gomez; Helen Gamboa; Dante Rivero; Pilar Pilapil; Eddie Garcia
- Cinematography: Rody Lacap
- Edited by: Augusto Salvador
- Music by: Willy Cruz
- Production company: Vision Films
- Distributed by: Vision Films
- Release date: 22 May 1989
- Running time: 120 minutes
- Country: Philippines
- Language: Filipino

Kailan Mahuhugasan ang Kasalanan? (English: When Will Sin Be Washed Away?) is a 1989 Philippine melodrama film directed by Lino Brocka from a screenplay written by Jose Y. Dalisay Jr., based on a DZRH radio drama of the same name by Salvador M. Royales. The film stars Lorna Tolentino, Richard Gomez, Helen Gamboa, Dante Rivero, Pilar Pilapil, and Eddie Garcia, with the supporting cast include Suzanne Gonzales, Ramil Rodriguez, Ernie Zarate, and Aida Carmona and the special participation of Rafael "Apa" Ongpin.

Produced and distributed by Vision Films, in its first film offering, the film was theatrically released on 22 May 1989, to a box-office success.

== Plot ==
In 1961, Oscar married Adora, and they had a daughter named Rosalia. Oscar, being a gambling addict, sold their daughter to his childless employers, Claudio and Beatriz Escudero, causing Adora to become hopeless about finding her husband or her daughter. Oscar was sentenced to 25 years and 6 months in prison for murdering a security guard during a bank robbery, while Adora and her friend Lourdes co-managed an eatery near the factory owned by the Escudero family patriarch.

Twenty-eight years later, Monica grew up into a fine young lady and finished law school. She and Robert Quintos, her classmate and academic rival, were among the top three law students who passed the bar examinations. Monica became part of a well-known law firm while Robert joined a group of lawyers that provide legal aid to the poor. Their rivalry, even after graduation, blossomed into romance. One day, Don Claudio meets Adora in the driveway and, charmed by her kindness, he convinces her to work as a cook in his house.

Adora accidentally saw Beatriz commit an affair with another man named Douglas. Douglas later murdered Beatriz, but Adora, who saw him leave and her dying in her arms, became a scapegoat for the crime. Due to no financial support, Adora seeks Robert's legal aid, which infuriated Monica because she felt betrayed that he was going to defend her mother's killer.

Oscar confessed to an imprisoned Adora that their daughter, Monica, had been sold to the Escudero family. Oscar later publicized the truth in court.

Monica, who now knows the truth, meets Adora in prison. Monica decides to defend her biological mother in the case. When Monica asks her father, Don Claudio, to testify at the court to prove Adora's innocence, he agrees. On the following day, while he proved Adora was innocent, Don Claudio admitted to the public that he was the one who killed his wife. It is revealed that Don Claudio discovered that Douglas hurt Beatriz, and he decides to stab him to death. However, Don Claudio accidentally stabbed his wife instead of Douglas. The court cleared Adora of the crime of murder but sentenced Don Claudio to prison.

The film ends with the wedding of Monica and Robert, with the former's biological parents as one of the witnesses.

== Cast ==
- Lorna Tolentino as Monica Escudero
  - Trisha Rodin as young Monica
- Richard Gomez as Robert Quintana
- Helen Gamboa as Adora Meneses
- Pilar Pilapil as Beatriz Escudero
- Dante Rivero as Oscar Lanting
- Eddie Garcia as Claudio Escudero
- Suzanne Gonzales as Lourdes
- Ramil Rodriguez as Atty. Roxas
- Gino Antonio as Douglas
- Ernie Zarate as Judge
- Aida Carmona as Julia
- Rafael "Apa" Ongpin as Dave
- Rene Matias as Driver
- Benjie Ledesma as Benjie
- Fred Capulong as Prison Cell Mate
- Joe Hardy as Gambling Den Bouncer
- Pocholo Montes as Atty. Nakar
- Mario De Venecia as Mario
- Dennis Baltazar as Dennis
- Jacqueline Garcia as Mistress
- Cesar Villeza as Husband
- Joseph Miller as Hospital Administrator
- Ernie Cloma as Laborer
- Julio Felizardo as Laborer

== Production ==
=== Casting ===
Actress Lorna Tolentino accepted the offer of playing Monica Escudero and cited that she wanted to work again with director Lino Brocka as the reason. Tolentino previously collaborated with Brocka in films including Lumuha Pati ang mga Anghel in 1971 for LEA Productions and recently, Natutulog Pa ang Diyos for Seiko Films a year earlier.

The film also served as the comeback of veteran actress Helen Gamboa in feature films. Before she accepted the role of Adora, Gamboa was previously offered thrice by Brocka to appear in his film projects but she turned them down. With the film's success and Gamboa receiving accolades from award-giving bodies, she starred again in a film project titled Oras-Oras, Araw-Araw, with her niece Sharon Cuneta, who previously worked with the director in Babangon Ako't Dudurugin Kita.

Rafael "Apa' Ongpin, one of ABS-CBN's young newscasters, was introduced in this film. Actor Eddie Garcia previously collaborated with Brocka in some films including Tubog sa Ginto in 1971 and Kontrobersyal in 1981 while actress Pilar Pilapil initially accepted the role in the film Kontrobersyal but later backed out.

=== Filming ===
The kissing scene between Lorna Tolentino and Richard Gomez became a concern for the former's son, Rap Fernandez, whom he saw that his mother kissed another man, rather than his father. Due to this, Tolentino began to refrain from making kissing and intimate scenes in her next films for the sake of her sons who were young at the time.

== Reception ==
=== Accolades ===
Accolades received by Kailan Mahuhugasan ang Kasalanan?
| Year | Award | Category | Recipient(s) | Result | Ref. |
|---|---|---|---|---|---|
| 1990 | Catholic Mass Media Awards (CMMA) | Best Actress | Helen Gamboa | Won | |
| 1990 | FAMAS Awards | Best Story | Salvador M. Royales | Nominated | |
| 1990 | FAMAS Awards | Best Screenplay | Jose Y. Dalisay Jr. | Nominated | |
| 1990 | FAMAS Awards | Best Actress | Lorna Tolentino | Nominated | |
| 1990 | FAMAS Awards | Best Actress | Helen Gamboa | Nominated | |
| 1990 | FAMAS Awards | Best Cinematography | Rody Lacap | Nominated | |
| 1990 | FAMAS Awards | Best Sound | Albert Rima | Nominated | |
| 1990 | Gawad Urian Awards | Best Actress | Helen Gamboa | Nominated | |
| 1990 | Gawad Urian Awards | Best Supporting Actor | Dante Rivero | Nominated | |
| 1990 | Star Awards | Best Actress | Lorna Tolentino | Nominated | |
| 1990 | Star Awards | Best Actress | Helen Gamboa | Nominated | |
