= Small Voices =

- Theatrical release poster
- Directed by: Gil Portes
- Written by: Adolfo Alix, Jr.; Gil M. Portes; Senedy H. Que
- Produced by: Gil Portes; Ray Cuerdo; Cresencio Bendijo; Isabel Chapman; Marissa Dames; Eric Manlunas; Deo Tinana
- Starring: Alessandra de Rossi
- Cinematography: Ely Cruz
- Edited by: George Jarlego
- Music by: Joy Marfil
- Production companies: Sky Island Films; CAP Philippines, Inc; Teamwork Productions
- Distributed by: Warner Bros. Pictures
- Release dates: September 10, 2002 (Toronto International Film Festival); July 2, 2003 (Philippines)
- Running time: 109 minutes
- Country: Philippines
- Languages: Filipino; English

Small Voices or Mga Munting Tinig is a 2002 Filipino drama film directed by Gil Portes and co-written by Adolfo Alix Jr. and Senedy Que. The film set in a public school won 11 awards and was nominated for 11 other including Gawad Urian Awards. It is the first out of eight Filipino films (along with Mallari, Under Parallel Skies, Uninvited, Ex Ex Lovers, Eraserheads: Combo on the Run, P77 and Midnight Girls) to be released by Warner Bros. Pictures.

== Plot ==
Melinda (Alessandra de Rossi) is a new substitute teacher at the Malawig Elementary School, located in a poor remote barrio. A young university graduate, her family expects her to look for work abroad, but in her idealism she takes on a challenging job in the provincial public school, which lacks resources and has corrupt personnel. The heavy monsoon rains and the nearby NPAs also add to her difficulties.

Melinda goes about her work with daily diligence though, always having a smile, a kind word for her neatly uniformed charges. But her battles against apathy, corruption, and contempt are constant, further hindered by the volatile political climate in which fathers and sons are constantly recruited to join guerilla forces fighting in the mountains.

When a funding opportunity in the form of a regional singing contest presents itself to Melinda, the idealistic teacher must smartly juggle uncooperative school administrators, confrontational parents, and the torn children themselves in order to let their small voices be heard.

== Cast ==
- Alessandra de Rossi as Melinda
- Dexter Doria as Mrs. Pantalan
- Gina Alajar as Chayong
- Amy Austria as Luz
- Bryan Homecillo as Popoy
- Pierro Rodriguez III as Obet
- Irma Adlawan as Fe
- Keno Agaro as Adong
- AJ Delos Santos as Carlos
- Sining Blanco as Gela
- Noni Buencamino as Fidel
- Malou Crisologo as Solita
- Hazel Logan as Ida
- Christian Galindo as Lino
- Nanding Josef as Adong's father
- Tony Mabesa as Mr. Tibayan
- Lailani Navarro as Pilar
- Jessie Diaz as Bugoy 1
- James Alvaro as Bugoy 2
- Rowell Reyes as Ato
- Alchris Galura
- Celina Suntay as Malawig choir kids
- Jocel Escobal as Malawig choir kids
- Myko Suntay as Malawig choir kids
- Jelly Cruz as Malawig choir kids
- Gemma Gonzales as Malawig choir kids
- Shamaine Centenera (now Shamaine Buencamino) as Adong's mom
- Connie Chua as Gela's mom
- Aleth dela Cruz as Ida's mom
- Hamid Eton as Mr. Singh
- Tessie Villarama as Teacher/Emcee
- Jess Evardone as Melinda's dad
- Jo Kristi Payet as Young Melinda
- Rey Mendoza as Adong's brother
- Jasper Vinarao as Adong's brother
- Bong Rodriguez as Ka Andres/NPA 1
- Jun Galindo as NPA 2
- Dr. Ramon Pedro P. Paterno as Central School Supervisor
- Menchu Suntay as Central School Supervisor
- Jenny Cruz as Central School Supervisor
- Luisa Logan as Pondahan Vendor
- Cesar Paz as Central School Guard
- Vic Buenaflor as Jeepney Driver
- Joy Marfil as Coach, Rizal Parochial School
- Jerome Rico as Malawig Choir Guitarist
- Myka del Castillo as Choir Soloist 1
- Anthony Verzosa as Rizal Choir Soloist
- Bobby Suntay as Choral Competition Judge
- Grace Suntay as Choral Competition Judge
- Pieth Suntay as Choral Competition Judge
- Malon Tinana as Choral Competition Judge
- Elma Agaro
- Helen Bahunsua
- Gema Blanco
- Gina Diaz
- Olive Gonzales
- Susan de los Santos
- Ruben Monsano
- Gloria Reyes
- Morris Reyes
- Fe Terrado
- Manny de los Santos

== Critical reception ==
Small Voices holds a 61% approval rating on review aggregator website Rotten Tomatoes, based on 28 reviews, with a weighted average of 5.5/10. It garnered a score of 58/100 on review aggregator website Metacritic based on 9 reviews.
