= Leonor Will Never Die =

- North American theatrical release poster
- Directed by: Martika Ramirez Escobar
- Written by: Martika Ramirez Escobar
- Produced by: Monster Jimenez; Mario Cornejo
- Starring: Sheila Francisco; Bong Cabrera; Rocky Salumbides; Anthony Falcon
- Cinematography: Carlos Mauricio
- Edited by: Lawrence Ang
- Music by: Alyana Cabral; Pan De Coco
- Production companies: Arkeofilms; ANIMA
- Distributed by: Cercamon World Sales
- Release dates: January 21, 2022 (Sundance); August 5, 2022 (Cinemalaya); November 25, 2022 (North America)
- Running time: 99 minutes
- Country: Philippines
- Language: Filipino
- Box office: $32,950

Leonor Will Never Die (Filipino: Ang Pagbabalik ng Kwago, lit. "Return of the Owl") is a 2022 Philippine psychological comedy drama film written and directed by Martika Ramirez Escobar, in her directorial debut. The film stars Sheila Francisco as a retired screenwriter who, after falling into a coma, finds herself the action hero of her unfinished screenplay. The supporting cast includes Bong Cabrera, Rocky Salumbides, and Anthony Falcon. The film is an homage to Filipino action films of the 1970s and '80s.

The film's Tagalog name is named after the 1978 single and one of the soundtrack songs Pagbabalik ng Kuwago by the Pinoy jazz-rock band Anak Bayan, led by the late drummer and vocalist Edmond "Bosyo" Fortuno.

Leonor Will Never Die premiered at the World Cinema Dramatic Competition of the 2022 Sundance Film Festival, the first Filipino film to compete since The Blossoming of Maximo Oliveros in 2006. The film received positive reviews, with Escobar being awarded the Special Jury Prize for Innovative Spirit. The film also premiered in the Philippines, opening the 18th Cinemalaya Philippine Independent Film Festival at the Cultural Center of the Philippines on August 5, 2022, marking the festival's return to on-site screening following the earlier challenges to hold the festival in its original form due to the COVID-19 pandemic. The film was acquired by Music Box Films for North American distribution in February 2022, and was released across North America in a limited release starting on November 25, 2022.

== Plot summary ==
Leonor Reyes (Sheila Francisco) was once a major player in the Filipino film industry after creating a string of successful action films, but now her household, consisting of Leonor and her son Rudie, struggles to pay the bills. When she reads an advertisement looking for screenplays, Leonor begins tinkering with an unfinished script about the quest of young, noble Ronwaldo (Rocky Salumbides), forced to avenge his brother’s murder at the hand of thugs. While her imagination provides some escape from reality, an accident involving a television knocks her out and sends her into a coma. This transports Leonor inside the incomplete movie where she can play out her wildest dreams firsthand and discover the perfect ending to her story. Meanwhile, Rudie seeks to discover where his mother went.

== Cast ==
- Sheila Francisco as Leonor Reyes
- Bong Cabrera as Rudie Reyes
- Rocky Salumbides as Ronwaldo
- Anthony Falcon as Dead Ronwaldo
- Allan Bautista as Valentin
- Rea Molina as Isabella
- Ryan Eigenmann as Ricardo
- John Paulo Rodriguez as Junior
- Dido Dela Paz as Mayor
- Tami Monsod as Dra. Valdez

== Production ==
=== Crew ===
Role	Crewmembers
Writer/Director	Martika Ramirez Escobar
Producers	Monster Jimenez & Mario Cornejo
Executive Producers	Aurora Oreta, Martika Ramirez Escobar & Quark Henares
Associate Director	Mikee De La Cruz
Line Producer	Rajiv Idnani
Director of Photography	Carlos Mauricio
Production Designer	Eero Yves S. Francisco
Editor	Lawrence S. Ang
Sound	Corinne de San Jose
Music	Alyana Cabral & Pan de Coco
Colorist	Timmy Torres
VFX Artist	Tricia Bernasor

=== Concept and development ===
The idea for the film came to Escobar when she was a young girl after action star-turned-politician Joseph Estrada was elected President of the Philippines. In the film's production notes, Escobar comments, "Today, decades later, after having two more ‘action star’ presidents, I find myself questioning this absurd reality and am surprised by how easy it can be understood once I place it in parallel with our love for movies." After graduating from the University of the Philippines Diliman with a film degree, Escobar began working on the screenplay and continued to edit and revise it over the next eight years while she worked as a cinematographer on other films. During that time, she also attended writing workshops of screenwriters Ricky Lee and Bong Lao.

=== Casting ===
For the role of Leonor, Escobar was looking for "someone who feels like they fit in that macho world, with the intelligence and sharpness of a writer, and the tough tenderness of a mother." The film's producer, Monster Jimenez, recommended Sheila Francisco after seeing her in the stage musical drama Ang Huling El Bimbo.

=== Filming and post-production ===
The film was shot in the Philippines from July to September 2019. The film was supported by the Film Development Council of the Philippines (FDCP) through its CreatePHFilms funding program and sponsored under its Full Circle Lab-Philippines development program.

== Reception ==
On the review aggregator website Rotten Tomatoes, 91% of 34 critics' reviews are positive, with an average rating of 7.30/10. The website's consensus reads: "A delightfully unique tribute to the transporting power of cinema, Leonor Will Never Die marks director/co-writer Martika Ramirez Escobar as a talent to watch." Metacritic, which uses a weighted average, assigned the film a score of 72 out of 100, based on 12 critics, indicating "generally favorable" reviews.

In a wrap-up of Sundance, The New York Times film critic A.O. Scott calls the film "wonderfully unclassifiable" and says "the combination of family melodrama, pulpy violence and surreal comedy add up to the disarmingly tender portrait of an artist on the edge of the afterlife." Marya Gates of RogerEbert.com says the film "establishes writer/director Martika Ramirez Escobar as an artist with a singular voice and bright future in halls of weird cinema," with Sheila Francisco "an utter delight as Leonor." In a mixed review, Amy Nicholson of Variety writes that it is "creative and clever – perhaps too clever" as towards the end of the film "the script’s ambitions have outreached its grasp, even with the formidable Francisco holding the stories’ layers together."

Along with The New York Times, the film is considered one of the best films of the 2022 Sundance Film Festival by The Atlantic and Vogue.

=== Accolades ===
At Sundance, the film was awarded the Special Jury Prize for Innovative Spirit. In recognition of the accolades of Leonor Will Never Die, as well as for the Short Film Grand Jury Prize-winner The Headhunter's Daughter, the Film Development Council of the Philippines (FDCP) chair Liza Diño-Seguerra described the moment as "Philippines Cinema's historic win at the Sundance," adding that the filmmakers are "writing history."

Year	Film Festival	Award	Result	Ref.
2022	CAAMFest	Comcast Xfinity Narrative Award	Won	
2022	Los Angeles Asian Pacific Film Festival	Special Jury Mention - Narrative Feature	Won	
2022	Razor Reel Fantastic Film Festival	Youngblood Award	Won	
2022	Toronto International Film Festival	Amplify Voices	Won	
2022	Sundance Film Festival	World Cinema Dramatic Competition Special Jury Prize: Innovative Spirit	Won	
2023	Independent Spirit Awards	Best International Film	Nominated	
