= Sa Paraiso ni Efren =

- Directed by: Maryo J. de los Reyes
- Screenplay by: Jun Robles Lana
- Story by: Robert Silverio
- Produced by: Lily Monteverde
- Starring: Anton Bernardo; Allan Paule; Ana Capri
- Cinematography: Shayne Sarte-Clemente
- Edited by: Roberto Vasadre
- Music by: Archie Castillo
- Production company: Good Harvest Productions
- Distributed by: Regal Films
- Release date: September 6, 1999
- Running time: 110 minutes
- Country: Philippines
- Language: Filipino

Sa Paraiso ni Efren (English: Efren's Paradise) is a 1999 Philippine drama film directed by Maryo J. de los Reyes and written by Jun Robles Lana from a story by Robert Silverio. Starring Anton Bernardo, Allan Paule, and Ana Capri, the film tackles emotional entanglements that interweave an unusual four-way relationship.

== Plot ==
Melvin, a gay man social worker, meets handsome stripper Efren and they become friends. When Melvin's mother dies, he moves in with Efren and his three female roommates.

== Cast ==
=== Main cast ===
- Allan Paule as Melvin
- Ana Capri as Ana
- Ynez Veneracion as Magda
- Anton Bernardo as Efren
- Marinella Moran as Rina
- Poppo Lontoc as Archie
- Simon Ibarra
- Alison VII as Anthony
- Anita Linda as Melvin's grandmother
- Vargie Labalan as Efren's next-door neighbor
- Migue Moreno
- Jackie Castillejos
- Girlie Alcantara
- Andy Cabral
- Alex Datu
- Jeric Evangelista
- Peter Flores
- Jun Pandi
- C.J. Reyes
- Chokoleit as Chokoleit
- Vice Ganda as Gossip Girl (uncredited)
