= Ana Capri =

Philippine actress

- Born: Ynfane Avanica; April 24, 1979 (age 47)
- Occupation: Actress
- Years active: 1996–present

Ynfane Avanica (born April 24, 1979), known professionally as Ana Capri, is a Filipino actress.

== Career ==
In 1996, Capri made her screen debut in Virgin People 2, directed by Celso Ad. Castillo, where she acted alongside Sunshine Cruz, Sharmaine Suarez, and Tonton Gutierrez.

== Filmography ==
=== Film ===
Year	Title	Role	Notes	Source
1996	Virgin People 2	Talya		
1998	Serafin Geronimo: Kriminal ng Bo. Concepcion			
1999	Sa Paraiso ni Efren	Ana		
1999	Pila-Balde	Gina		
2000	Arayyy!			
2000	Live Show	Rosita		
2002	Bakat	Leslie		
2004	Spirit of the Glass	Ada		
2005	Ala Verde, Ala Pobre	Jessica		
2008	Hugot			
2016	Barcelona: A Love Untold	Jane Antonio		
2016	2 Cool 2 Be 4gotten	Demetria		

=== Television ===
Year	Title	Role	Notes	Source
2001–2002	Ikaw Lang ang Mamahalin	Gina Reyes		
2005–2006	Mga Anghel na Walang Langit	Cresing		
2007	Impostora	Saling		
2007–2008	Sine Novela: My Only Love	Magda		
2008	E.S.P.	Laila	Episode: "The New Friend"	
2008	Sine Novela: Magdusa Ka	Hedy		
2008	LaLola	Oring		
2009	Rosalinda	Alma		
2010	SRO Cinemaserye	Anita	Episode: "Meet the Fathers"	
2010	Maalaala Mo Kaya	Lani		
2010	First Time	Hilda Gomez	Recurring role	
2010–2011	Noah	Adah		
2011	Maalaala Mo Kaya	Edith		
2011	Agimat: Ang Mga Alamat ni Ramon Revilla: Kapitan Inggo	Anita Domingo		
2011	Maalaala Mo Kaya	Auring	Episode: "Toga"; Credited as "Ana Capri"	
2011–2012	Amaya	Agang		
2012	Nandito Ako	Mylene		
2012	Wansapanataym	Ibona	Episode: "Hungry Birds"; Credited as "Ana Capri"	
2012	One True Love	Dyna		
2013	Carlo J. Caparas' Dugong Buhay	Elena Pineda		
2013–2014	Magkano Ba ang Pag-ibig?	Lualhati Macaraeg-Buenaventura		
2014	Pure Love	Juliet		
2014	Ipaglaban Mo!	Linda	Episode: "Amin ang Pamana Mo"	
2015	Forevermore	Tetay Fernandez		
2015	All of Me	Bebeng Dimaculangan		
2015	Magpakailanman	Baby	Episode: "Isang Mister, Limang Asawa"	
2016	FPJ's Ang Probinsyano	Ligaya		
2016	Ipaglaban Mo!	Rona	Episode: "Kahati"	
2016	Karelasyon	Olive	Episode: "Two Mothers"	
2016	Magkaibang Mundo	Barang		
2018	The Blood Sisters	Lorraine Fernandez	Special participation	
2018	Ipaglaban Mo!	Letty Gregorio	Episode: "Bastardo"	
2018–2019	Ngayon at Kailanman	Ising Bernabe		

== Awards and nominations ==
Year	Work	Award	Category	Result	Source
1999	Serafin Geronimo: Kriminal ng Bo. Concepcion	Film Academy of the Philippines Awards	Best Supporting Actress	Nominated	
1999	Pila-Balde	Cinemanila International Film Festival	Best Actress	Won	
2005	Ala Verde, Ala Pobre	Cinemanila International Film Festival	Best Actress	Won	
2005	Ala Verde, Ala Pobre	Golden Screen Awards	Best Actress	Won	
2013	One True Love	Golden Screen TV Awards	Outstanding Supporting Actress in a Drama Series for	Nominated	
2017	Laut	33rd PMPC Star Awards for Movies	Best Supporting Actress	Won	
