= Nang Iniwan Mo Ako =

- Official release poster on DVD
- Directed by: Jose Javier Reyes
- Written by: Jose Javier Reyes
- Produced by: William C. Leary
- Starring: Sharon Cuneta; Albert Martinez; Matthew Mendoza; Valentin Simon
- Cinematography: Eduardo Jacinto
- Edited by: Danny Gloria
- Music by: Nonong Buencamino
- Production companies: Viva Films; Available Light Productions
- Distributed by: Viva Films
- Release date: March 15, 1997
- Running time: 116 minutes
- Country: Philippines
- Language: Filipino

Nang Iniwan Mo Ako (lit. 'When You Left Me') is a 1997 Philippine family drama film written and directed by Jose Javier Reyes. The film stars Sharon Cuneta in her comeback for Viva Films after making the film Madrasta for Star Cinema a year earlier.

Produced and distributed by Viva Films, in association with Available Light Productions, the film was theatrically released on March 15, 1997.

== Plot ==
The story revolves around middle-aged Annie Lorenzo (Sharon Cuneta), a dedicated and loving housewife who was deserted by her husband, Anton Lorenzo (Albert Martinez), for a younger woman. Anton comes home one day and announces to Annie that he is leaving her. She confides to her friends, who tell her that they have been seeing her husband with a younger woman in multiple places, but decided not to tell her because they did not want to seem invasive.

Anton is seen shopping and living in an expensive condo with his new lover. Annie, on the other hand, struggles with the separation. She calls Anton for help to pay the pending bills for the house, but gets dismissed. He says she is disrupting his meeting, and in doing so, he will lose his job and will not pay her bills. He hangs up afterwards, leaving a distraught Annie in tears.

She gets together with her friends and spies outside the new condo of her cheating husband and sees his new lover outside the building, preparing for a jog. This prompts Annie to clean her closet, throw out all of Anton’s old clothes, and seek help from a lawyer.

Her lawyer informs her that the condo bought by his husband is under his lover’s name. This fuels Annie’s frustration even more, as Anton also declined her request to have their shared properties under her and her son’s name.

She goes from one interview to another looking for a job, but gets no luck in getting hired. Annie then gets a call from a friend who persuades her to attend an anniversary party. Annie complies, but gets surprised when Anton also shows up at the party uninvited. He talks to her about having some time with his son. She begrudgingly agrees. The next day, Anton takes their son for a visit, and Annie watches them leave through a window.

Her friend helps her land a job when a gay investor (Bernie) decides to open a catering service and has Annie for a partner. They get their first client, and a busy Annie is shown busily cooking one dish from the other. Bernie’s client notices that their buffet table is missing a pasta dish, and he angrily rushes to the kitchen to tell Annie about the problem. She tries to look for ingredients to cook spaghetti in the pantry and gets sidetracked when her husband’s lover asks her where to get water, not knowing that Annie knows her from her stint in the condo.

Anton is then seen to pick up their son Sammy from school. He asks how Annie is doing, and Sammy responds that his mommy has been busier than ever due to her catering business. Anton decides to bring Sammy to his condo, where his lover and son meet for the first time. He introduces her as tita, and his lover asks to speak with him privately. She says she prefers their life to be more private as she does not want to be involved in Anton’s family life.

Waiting in the mall, Annie’s friends are surprised when they see her all glammed up. They persuade her to meet other people now that she’s filing for legal separation. They get approached by Annie’s lawyer in the cafe, and she gets multiple teasing from her friends for being asked out for dinner by Mike.

Sammy visits his dad’s condo again and shares with his dad that his mom has been going out with her lawyer.

== Cast ==
- Sharon Cuneta as Amy Lorenzo
- Albert Martinez as Anton Lorenzo
- Matthew Mendoza as Mike
- Valentin Simon as Samuel Lorenzo (son)
- Maritoni Fernandez as Diane
- Jackie Castillejos as Missy

== Production ==
The movie was produced by Viva Films, and was processed under LVN Pictures. The post-production was supervised and handled by Sampaguita Pictures.

== Reception ==
Critics believe that this was one of the best roles that Sharon has portrayed alongside Albert Martinez. The story became relatable as most marriages go through the same path. The movie detailed the struggles of single parenting, healing, and finding new hope.
