= Woman of Breakwater =

Women of Breakwater
- DVD
- Directed by: Mario O'Hara
- Written by: Mario O'Hara
- Produced by: Arlene L. Aguas
- Starring: Katherine Luna
- Cinematography: Rey de Leon
- Edited by: Roberto Vasadre
- Music by: Jesse Lucas
- Production company: Entertainment Warehouse Inc.
- Release date: December 3, 2003
- Running time: 124 minutes
- Country: Philippines
- Language: Filipino

Women of Breakwater, also known as Woman of Breakwater or Babae sa Breakwater in Tagalog, is a 2003 Filipino drama film directed by Mario O'Hara and starring Katherine Luna. The film is a moving insight into the squalor and poverty of inner-city life in the Philippines. As a tragic tale, it covers a whole plethora of emotions surrounding the lives of some of the poorest people in Manila portrayed in the film.

== Plot ==
Basilio (Kristoffer King) escapes provincial Leyte to the slums of Manila with his younger brother Buboy (Alcris Galura). Residing in the shanty town tenements beneath the tourist-infested breakwater and seawalls of the city, Basilio falls in love with a prostitute named Paquita (Katherine Luna).

Paquita started whoring early in life that at her relatively young age she's already "played out", her body full of sexual diseases and open sores. But their relationship is troubled only by the apparent poverty and the more impending threat of the slums' jealous protector, ex-cop Dave (Gardo Versoza).

== Cast ==
- Katherine Luna as Paquita
- Kristoffer King as Basilio
- Gardo Versoza as Dave Pilay
- Amy Austria as Jovy
- Alcris Galura as Buboy
- Yoyoy Villame as Pulubi
- Evelyn Vargas
- Jeanette Nunag as Mariposa
- Lou Veloso as Igme
- Lucita Soriano as Aning
- Rez Cortez as Foreman
- Odette Khan as Marta
- Daniel Fernando as Tatay
- Nonong de Andres as Taong Grasa
- Lilia Cuntapay as Serena
