= List of Philippine films of 2014 =

This is an incomplete list of Filipino full-length films, both mainstream and independently produced, released in theaters and cinemas in 2014.

== Top ten grossing films ==
Rank	Film	Production outfit	Domestic gross^{1}	Source
1.	The Amazing Praybeyt Benjamin	Star Cinema, Viva Films	₱ 455,000,000 (est.)	
2.	Starting Over Again	Star Cinema	₱ 410,188,028	
3.	Bride for Rent	Star Cinema	₱ 326,958,425	
4.	She's Dating the Gangster	Star Cinema	₱ 254,426,481	
5.	Feng Shui 2	Star Cinema, K Productions	₱ 244,000,000 (est.)	
6.	English Only, Please	Quantum Films	₱ 135,000,000 (est.)	
7.	Maybe This Time	Star Cinema, Viva Films	₱ 134,638,610	
8.	Da Possessed	Star Cinema, Regal Entertainment	₱ 122,698,866	
9.	Diary ng Panget: The Movie	Viva Films	₱ 119,534,657	
10.	The Gifted	Viva Films, MVP Pictures	₱ 78,405,698	

Note

1. ^1 Box Office Mojo, a reliable third party box office revenue tracker, does not track any revenues earned during any Metro Manila Film Festival editions. So the official figures by film entries during the festival are only estimates taken from any recent updates from credible and reliable sources such as a film's production outfit, or from any news agencies. Also, Metropolitan Manila Development Authority (MMDA) did not release the official gross sales of each of the films. To verify the figures, see individual sources for the references.

Color key

- – a Metro Manila Film Festival entry film

== Films ==
=== January–March ===
Opening		Title	Production company	Cast and crew	Genre	Source
J A N U A R Y	15	Bride for Rent	Star Cinema	Mae Czarina Cruz (director); Kim Chiu, Xian Lim, Pilita Corrales, Tirso Cruz III, and Dennis Padilla	Romance, comedy, drama	
J A N U A R Y	22	Mumbai Love	Capestone Pictures, Solar Entertainment Corporation	Benito Bautista (director); Solenn Heussaff, Kiko Matos, Raymond Bagatsing, Jayson Gainza, Ronnie Lazaro, and Martin Escudero, Reggie Averia	Romance, comedy	
J A N U A R Y	26	Luhod sa Harapan	Silver Line Multi-Media Inc.	Paul Singh Cudail (director/writer); Nino Abel, Benny Andaya, and Cristy Atienza	Drama	
J A N U A R Y	29	Sa Ngalan ng Ama, Ina at mga Anak	RCP Productions, Star Cinema	Jon Villarin (director); Robin Padilla, Mariel Rodriguez, Kylie Padilla, Bela Padilla, Daniel Padilla, Mathew Padilla, RJ Padilla, Kiray, Kathryn Bernardo, and Christopher De Leon	Action, drama	
F E B R U A R Y	12	Starting Over Again	Star Cinema	Olivia M. Lamasan (director); Piolo Pascual, Toni Gonzaga, and Iza Calzado	Romance, comedy, drama	
F E B R U A R Y	12	Basement	Coffee House Productions, Springboard Film Productions, GMA Films	Topel Lee (director); Ellen Adarna, Enzo Pineda, Sarah Lahbati, Pilita Corrales, Louise delos Reyes, Kristofer Martin, and Teejay Marquez	Horror, suspense-thriller	
F E B R U A R Y	19	ABNKKBSNPLAko: The Movie	Viva Films	Mark Meily (director); Jericho Rosales, Andi Eigenmann, and Meg Imperial	Comedy	
F E B R U A R Y	26	Third Eye	Regal Films	Aloy Adlawan (director); Carla Abellana, Alex Vincent Medina, Ejay Falcon, Camille Prats, and Denise Laurel	Horror	
F E B R U A R Y	26	Cattleya: An OFW Story	One World Production International Films	Joric Raquiza (director); Glaiza de Castro, and Jonalyn Viray	Drama	
F E B R U A R Y	26	Unfriend	Centerstage Productions, Beyond The Box, Solar Entertainment Corporation	Joselito Altarejos (director); Angelo Ilagan, Sandino Martin, and Boots Anson-Roa	Crime, romance, drama	
F E B R U A R Y	26	Tatlong Beses Isang Araw: 3 Times A Day	AB Pride Production	Benny Andaya (director/writer); Nino Abel, Andrew Basco, and Fernan del Valle	Drama	
F E B R U A R Y	26	Kabaro	Triple M Entertainment Productions	Francis Jun Posadas (director/writer); Mara Lopez, Krista Miller, Marcus Madrigal, and Maria Isabel Lopez	Romance	
F E B R U A R Y	26	Pikyaw	Multimedia Arts & Graphics Ensemble	Arnold Fuentes (director); Augustus Alolor, Marylour Avila, and Anabel Balane	Animation	
F E B R U A R Y	28	Alibughang Anak	Gospel Media Productions	Rodolfo Fajardo (director/writer); Ram Mercado, Abbygale Monderin, Marko Boy Alima, Tal Garcia, Lucita Soriano, Roldan Aquino, Richie De Horse, Alex Tinsay, Popoy Bardos	Action, drama	
M A R C H	11	Norte, the End of History *(2014 commercial release) (limited release)	Kayan Productions, Wacky O Productions	Lav Diaz (director); Sid Lucero, Archie Alemania and Angeli Bayani	Drama	
M A R C H	13	Kamandag ni Venus	Teknikolour Film Productions	Zaldy Damun and Bunch Cortez (directors); Rajah Montero, Apple Angeles, and Rob Sy	Horror	
M A R C H	19	Flying Kiss	Department of Health, Sinehan Advocacy Media Projects	Chris Pablo (director); Carl Guevarra, Wynwyn Marquez, Fabio Ide, Maria Isabel Lopez, and Ate Gay	Comedy, romance, advocacy	
M A R C H	19	Mana	La Sallian Education Innovators Foundation, Inc.	Gabriel Fernandez (director/writer); Fides Cuyugan-Asensio, Tetchie Agbayani, Ricky Davao, Jaime Fabregas, Cherie Gil, Mark Gil, and Epi Quizon	Drama, horror	

=== April–June ===
Opening		Title	Production company	Cast and crew	Genre	Source
A P R I L	2	Diary ng Panget	Viva Films	Andoy Ranay (director); Nadine Lustre, Yassi Pressman, Andre Paras, and James Reid	Teen romance, comedy	
A P R I L	2	Echoserang Frog	Scenema Concepts International	Joven Tan (director); Shalala	Comedy, gay-themed	
A P R I L	6	Bang Bang Alley	Curve Entertainment Inc., Nimbus Film Production	Ely Buendia, Yan Yuzon, and King Palisoc (directors); Megan Young, Bela Padilla, Joel Torre, and Art Acuña	Crime anthology	
A P R I L	6	DotA: Nakakabaliw	Manchester Talent Productions Films	Marivic Cuyugan (director), James Matthew, Joyce Ching, Joanna Elle, and Jaypee Adalen	Romance, comedy, E-sports	
A P R I L	19	Da Possessed	Star Cinema, Regal Entertainment	Joyce Bernal (director); Vhong Navarro and Solenn Heussaff	Comedy, horror	
M A Y	7	So It's You	Regal Entertainment	Jun Lana (director), Carla Abellana, Tom Rodriguez, and JC de Vera	Drama, romance, comedy	
M A Y	7	Full Moon	Lovely Nell Entertainment	Dante Pangilinan (director), Derrick Monasterio, and Barbie Forteza	Horror, action, romance	
M A Y	28	Maybe This Time	Star Cinema, Viva Films	Jerry Lopez-Sineneng (director); Sarah Geronimo, Coco Martin, and Ruffa Gutierrez	Drama, romance	
J U N E	11	My Illegal Wife	Star Cinema, Skylight Films	Tony Y. Reyes (director); Zanjoe Marudo, and Pokwang	Romantic comedy	
J U N E	18	Ang Bagong Dugo	3J's Film and Entertainment Production Inc.	Val Iglesias (director); Joem Bascon, and Mark Gil	Drama	
J U N E	30	Last Trip to Paradise	MFTWorks Films, Transition Films	Archie Del Mundo (director/writer); Allan Ibanez	Drama	

=== July–September ===
Color key

- – a World Premieres Film Festival entry film
- – a Cinemalaya Philippine Independent Film Festival entry film
- – a Cine Totoo: 1st Philippine International Documentary Film Festival entry film

Opening		Title	Production company	Cast and crew	Genre	Source
J U L Y	2	Overtime	GMA Films	Wyncy Ong (director); Richard Gutierrez, and Lauren Young	Action, thriller	
J U L Y	3	Mula sa Kung Ano ang Noon	Sine Olivia Pilipinas	Lav Diaz (director); Perry Dizon, Roeder Camañag, Hazel Orencio	Drama	
J U L Y	9	Kamkam	Heaven's Best Entertainment	Joel Lamangan (director); Jean Garcia, Sunshine Dizon, Lucho Ayala, Rita De Guzman, Allen Dizon, Hiro Peralta, Joyce Ching, and Elizabeth Oropesa	Political drama	
J U L Y	16	She's Dating the Gangster	Star Cinema	Cathy Garcia-Molina (director); Kathryn Bernardo, and Daniel Padilla	Teen romantic comedy-drama	
J U L Y	16	Magtiwala Ka: A Super Typhoon Yolanda Story	Crystal Audio Productions	Jovic Raquiza (director); Kevin Mercado, Keanna Reeves, and Andrea del Rosario	Inspirational	
J U L Y	23	Island Dreams *(2014 commercial release)	Kenau Pictures Production	Aloy Adlawan, Gino Santos (directors); Louise delos Reyes, Alexis Petitprez, and Irma Adlawan	Romance	
J U L Y	30	Trophy Wife	Viva Films	Andoy Ranay (director); Cristine Reyes, Derek Ramsay, Heart Evangelista, and John Estrada	Romance, drama, thriller	
A U G U S T	2	Asintado	Ignacio Films	Louie Ignacio (director); Aiko Melendez, Gabby Eigenmann, Rochelle Pangilinan, Jake Vargas, and Miggs Cuaderno	Drama, thriller	
A U G U S T	2	Hari ng Tondo		Carlos Siguion-Reyna (director); Robert Arevalo, Cris Villonco, Rafa Siguion-Reyna, Aiza Seguerra, and Eric Quizon	Drama	
A U G U S T	2	Hustisya	Likhang Silangan Entertainment	Joel Lamangan (director); Nora Aunor, Rocco Nacino, Rosanna Roces, Sunshine Dizon, and Gardo Versoza	Drama, political thriller	
A U G U S T	2	The Janitor		Mike Tuviera (director); Dennis Trillo, Derek Ramsay, Richard Gomez, and LJ Reyes	Action, thriller	
A U G U S T	2	Kasal		Joselito Altarejos (director); Arnold Reyes and Oliver Aquino	Drama, romance	
A U G U S T	2	#Y		Gino Santos (director); Elmo Magalona, Coleen Garcia, Sophie Albert, Kit Thompson, Slater Young, and Chynna Ortaleza	Teen drama	
A U G U S T	2	1st ko si 3rd ^{2}		Real Florido (director); Nova Villa, Dante Rivero, and Freddie Webb	Drama, Romantic Comedy	
A U G U S T	2	Bwaya		Francis Xavier Pasion (director); Angeli Bayani	Drama	
A U G U S T	2	Children's Show		Derick Cabrido (director); Allen Dizon, Gloria Sevilla, Buboy Villar and Miggs Cuaderno	Drama	
A U G U S T	2	Dagitab	Ten17P	Giancarlo Abrahan V (director); Eula Valdez, Noni Buencamino, and Martin del Rosario	Romance	
A U G U S T	2	K’na, The Dreamweaver		Ida Anita del Mundo (director); Mara Lopez, RK Bagatsing, and Alex Vincent Medina	Drama	
A U G U S T	2	Mariquina	Ten17P	Milo Sogueco (director); Mylene Dizon, Ricky Davao, Barbie Forteza, and Kenneth Paul Cruz	Drama	
A U G U S T	2	Ronda		Nick Olanka (director); Ai-Ai de las Alas, Julian Trono, and Carlo Aquino	Drama	
A U G U S T	2	Separados		GB Sampedro (director); Erik Santos, Alfred Vargas, Jason Abalos, Ricky Davao, Anjo Yllana, and Victor Neri	Comedy	
A U G U S T	2	Sundalong Kanin		Janice O'Hara (director); Marc Abaya, and Art Acuña	Period drama	
A U G U S T	6	Once a Princess	Skylight Films, Regal Entertainment	Laurice Guillen (director); Erich Gonzales, Enchong Dee, and JC de Vera	Romance	
A U G U S T	7	Edna	Artiste Entertainment Works International	Ronnie Lazaro (director); Irma Adlawan	Drama	
A U G U S T	13	Barber's Tales	APT Entertainment, Octobertrain Films, Hong Kong-Asian Film Financing	Jun Lana (director); Eugene Domingo, Eddie Garcia, Iza Calzado, Gladys Reyes, Sharmaine Buencamino, Noni Buencamino, and Sue Prado	Drama	
A U G U S T	20	Talk Back and You're Dead	Viva Films, Skylight Films	Andoy Ranay (director); Nadine Lustre, James Reid, Joseph Marco	Teen romance, comedy, action	
A U G U S T	20	Somebody to Love	Regal Entertainment	Joey Reyes (director); Carla Abellana, Matteo Guidicelli, Iza Calzado, Isabelle Daza, and Ella Cruz	Romance, comedy	
S E P T E M B E R	3	The Gifted	Viva Films	Chris Martinez (director); Anne Curtis, Cristine Reyes, and Sam Milby	Romantic comedy	
S E P T E M B E R	10	Norte, the End of History *(2014 commercial release) (wide release)	Kayan Productions, Origin8 Media	Lav Diaz (director); Sid Lucero, Angeli Bayani, Archie Alemania, Soliman Cruz, Mailes Kanapi, Hazel Orencio, and Mae Paner	Drama	
S E P T E M B E R	17	Maria Leonora Teresa	Star Cinema	Wenn Deramas (director); Iza Calzado, Zanjoe Marudo, Jodi Sta. Maria	Horror, drama	
S E P T E M B E R	24	Dementia	Regal Entertainment, Studio 5	Perci Intalan-Lana (director); Nora Aunor, Jasmine Curtis-Smith, Chynna Ortaleza, Yul Servo, Bing Loyzaga, and Althea Vega	Horror	
S E P T E M B E R	24	Walang Rape sa Bontok	GMA News TV	Mark Lester Menor Valle (documentarist)	Documentary	
S E P T E M B E R	24	Mananayaw	GMA News TV	Rafael Froilan (documentarist)	Documentary	
S E P T E M B E R	24	Gitaristang Hindi Marunong Mag-skala	GMA News TV	Sigfred Barros-Sanchez (documentarist)	Documentary	
S E P T E M B E R	24	Ang Walang Kapagurang Paglalakbay ng Pulang Maleta	GMA News TV	Richard Legaspi (documentarist)	Documentary	
S E P T E M B E R	24	Gusto Nang Umuwi Ni Joy	GMA News TV	Jan Tristan Pandy (documentarist)	Documentary	
S E P T E M B E R	24	Agbalbalitok	GMA News TV	Ferdinand Balanag (documentarist)	Documentary	
S E P T E M B E R	24	A Trip to Haifa	GMA News TV	Nawruz Paguidopon (documentarist)	Documentary	
S E P T E M B E R	24	Kung Giunsa Pagbuhat ang Bisayang Chopsuey	GMA News TV	Charliebebs Gohetia (documentarist)	Documentary	
S E P T E M B E R	24	Migkahi E Si Amey Te, ‘Uli Ki Pad	GMA News TV	Nef Luczon (documentarist)	Documentary	
S E P T E M B E R	24	Marciano	GMA News TV	Ivy Universe Baldoza (documentarist)	Documentary	
S E P T E M B E R	24	Komikero Chronicles	GMA News TV	Keith Sicat (documentarist)	Documentary	

Note

1. ^2 1st Ko si 3rd was also a QCinema International Film Festival entry film.

=== October–December ===
Color key

- – a Cinemalaya Philippine Independent Film Festival entry film
- – a Sineng Pambansa Horror Plus Film Festival entry film
- – a QCinema International Film Festival entry film
- – a Cinema One Originals Film Festival entry film
- – a MMFF New Wave Category entry film
- – a Metro Manila Film Festival entry film

Opening		Title	Production company	Cast and crew	Genre	Source
O C T O B E R	1	Ibong Adarna: The Pinoy Adventure	Gurion Entertainment	Jun Urbano (director); Rocco Nacino, Joel Torre, Angel Aquino, Leo Martinez, Benjie Paras, Ronnie Lazaro, and Pat Fernandez	Historical, fiction	
O C T O B E R	1	*Hari ng Tondo (commercial release)	Reyna Films, Star Cinema	Carlos Siguion-Reyna (director); Robert Arevalo, Cris Villonco, Rez Cortez, Rafael Siguion-Reyna, Liza Lorena, Lorenz Martinez, and Aiza Seguerra	Drama, comedy	
O C T O B E R	8	Tumbang Preso	Spears Activation Company	Kip Oebanda (director); Kean Cipriano, Teri Malvar, Ronnie Lazaro, Jaclyn Jose, and Sharmaine Buencamino	Suspense, thriller	
O C T O B E R	8	*The Janitor (commercial release)	APT Entertainment, Star Cinema	Mike Tuviera (director); Dennis Trillo, Richard Gomez, Derek Ramsay, Ricky Davao, Irma Adlawan, LJ Reyes, and Raymond Bagatsing	Action, crime	
O C T O B E R	15	The Trial	Star Cinema	Chito S. Roño (director); John Lloyd Cruz, Richard Gomez, Gretchen Barretto, Jessy Mendiola, Sylvia Sanchez, and Enrique Gil	Drama, crime, thriller	
O C T O B E R	22	Dilim	Regal Films	Jose Javier Reyes (director); Kylie Padilla, Rayver Cruz, Rafael Rosell, Ella Cruz, and Joross Gamboa	Horror, suspense, thriller	
O C T O B E R	29	Beauty in a Bottle	Star Cinema, Quantum Films	Antoinette Jadaone (director); Angelica Panganiban, Angeline Quinto, Assunta de Rossi, and Tom Rodriguez	Comedy, romance, satire	
O C T O B E R	29	Bacao	FDCP	Edgardo Vinarao (director); Michelle Madrigal, Arnold Reyes, Marife Necesito	Horror	
O C T O B E R	29	Hukluban	FDCP	Gil Portes (director); Kiko Matos, and Krista Miller	Horror	
O C T O B E R	29	Sigaw sa Hatinggabi	FDCP	Romy V. Suzara (director); Regine Angeles, China Roces, Vangie Labalan, and Richard Quan	Horror	
O C T O B E R	29	T'yanak	FDCP	Peque Gallaga, Lore Reyes (directors); Judy Ann Santos, Solenn Heussaff, Sid Lucero, and Tom Rodriguez	Horror	
N O V E M B E R	5	Moron 5.2: The Transformation	Viva Films	Wenn V. Deramas (director); Luis Manzano, Billy Crawford, Marvin Agustin, DJ Durano, Matteo Guidicelli, and John Lapus	Comedy	
N O V E M B E R	5	Alienasyon	QCinema	Arnel Mardoquio (director/screenplay); Spanky Manikan, Tessie Tomas, Shamaine Buencamino	Drama	
N O V E M B E R	7	Cemetery Life	QCinema	Barbara Politsch (documentarist)	Documentary	
N O V E M B E R	8	Tres	Film Academy of the Philippines; Film Development Council of the Philippines; National Commission for Culture and the Arts	Jose N. Carreon, William G. Mayo, Edgardo "Boy" Vinarao (directors); Jeffrey Yap, Julie L. Po, Therese Ann Cayaba (screenplay); Bembol Roco, Leo Martinez, Rcee Tenefrancia, Ela Bautista, Jazzyl Torreflores	Anthology drama	
N O V E M B E R	8	Nick & Chai	QCinema	Cha Escala & Wena Sanchez (documentarists)	Documentary	
N O V E M B E R	8	Tigbao	Parable Films; Dakila Collective	M. Bonifacio (director); Lou Veloso, Ronnie Lazaro, Archie Adamos	Drama	
N O V E M B E R	9	Bitukang Manok	Cinema One Originals	Alec Figuracion (director); Ken Anderson, Mara Lopez, Kate Alejandrino, Chino Alfonso, Guji Lorenzana, and Teri Malvar	Psychological thriller	
N O V E M B E R	9	Esprit de Corps	Cinema One Originals	Auraeus Solito (director); Sandino Martin, JC Santos, Lharby Policarpio	Drama	
N O V E M B E R	9	Hindi Sila Tatanda	Cinema One Originals	Malay Javier (director), Kean Cipriano, Mara Lopez, Ketchup Eusebio, Dawn Jimenez	Sci-fi, teen	
N O V E M B E R	9	The Housekeepers	Cinema One Originals	Paolo O'Hara (director), Jayson Gainza, Katya Santos	Comedy, drama	
N O V E M B E R	9	Lorna	Cinema One Originals	Sigrid Andrea P. Bernardo (director); Sharmaine Buencamino, Maria Isabel Lopez, Racquel Villavicencio, Lav Diaz, and Felix Roco	Drama, romance	
N O V E M B E R	9	Red	Cinema One Originals	Jay Abello (director); Jericho Rosales	Drama	
N O V E M B E R	9	Seoul Mates	Cinema One Originals	Nash Ang (director); Mimi Juareza, Kim Ji-soo	Romance, drama	
N O V E M B E R	9	Soap Opera	Cinema One Originals	Remton Siega Zuasola (director), Lovi Poe, Rocco Nacino	Drama	
N O V E M B E R	9	That Thing Called Tadhana	Cinema One Originals	Antoinette Jadaone (director); Angelica Panganiban, JM de Guzman	Romantic comedy	
N O V E M B E R	9	Violator	Cinema One Originals	Eduardo Dayao (director); Victor Neri, RK Bagatsing, Anthony Falcon, Joel Lamangan	Drama, horror	
N O V E M B E R	12	Relaks, It's Just Pag-ibig	Spring Films, Star Cinema	Irene Villamor & Antoinette Jadaone (directors); Inigo Pascual, Julian Estrada, Sofia Andres, Ericka Villongco, and Smokey Manaloto	Teen, romantic comedy	
N O V E M B E R	12	*1st Ko si 3rd (commercial release)	Cinemalaya	Real Florido (director); Nova Villa, Freddie Webb, and Dante Rivero	Romantic comedy	
N O V E M B E R	26	Past Tense	Star Cinema	Mae Czarina Cruz (director); Kim Chiu, Xian Lim, Ai-Ai de las Alas, Daniel Matsunaga, Melisa Cantiveros	Romantic comedy	
D E C E M B E R	10	*#Y (commercial release)	Star Cinema	Gino Santos (director); Elmo Magalona, Coleen Garcia, Kit Thompson, Sophie Albert, and Chynna Ortaleza	Teen drama	
D E C E M B E R	17	Gemini	Blackswan Pictures	Ato Bautista (director); Sheena McBride, Brigitte McBride, Mon Confiado	Psychological thriller, drama	
D E C E M B E R	17	Magkakabaung	ATD Entertainment Productions	Jason Paul Laxamana (director); Allen Dizon, Gladys Reyes, and Chanel Latorre	Drama	
D E C E M B E R	17	M: Mother's Maiden Name	Eight Films	Zig Dulay (director); Zsa Zsa Padilla, Dennis Padilla, and Nico Antonio	Drama	
D E C E M B E R	17	Maratabat: Pride and Honor	Blank Pages Productions	Arlyn dela Cruz (director); Ping Medina, Julio Diaz, Kristoffer King, Elizabeth Oropesa, Richard Quan	Drama	
D E C E M B E R	17	Mulat	Dvent Productions	Maria Diane Ventura (director); Ryan Eigenmann, Loren Burgos, Jake Cuenca	Drama	
D E C E M B E R	17	Gangster Lolo	Cosmic Raven Ventures Productions	William G. Mayo (director); Soxie Topacio (screenplay); Leo Martinez, Bembol Roco, Soxie Topacio, Pen Medina, Rez Cortez, Isabel Granada, Janice Jurado, Richard Quan, Boy Alano, Archie Adamos	Action comedy	
D E C E M B E R	25	Bonifacio: Ang Unang Pangulo	Philippians Productions & Entertainment Inc., Tuko Film Productions, Buchi Boy Films, and RCP Productions	Enzo Williams (director); Robin Padilla, Vina Morales, Daniel Padilla, Jasmine Curtis-Smith, Eddie Garcia, Gabby Concepcion, Jericho Rosales, and Isabel Oli	Historical, epic	
D E C E M B E R	25	English Only, Please	Quantum Films, Heaven's Best Entertainment	Dan Villegas (director); Jennylyn Mercado and Derek Ramsay	Romantic comedy	
D E C E M B E R	25	Feng Shui 2	Star Cinema, K Productions	Chito Roño (director); Kris Aquino and Coco Martin	Horror, suspense	
D E C E M B E R	25	Kubot: The Aswang Chronicles 2	Reality Entertainment, GMA Films and AgostoDos Pictures	Erik Matti (director); Dingdong Dantes, Isabelle Daza, and Hannah Ledesma	Horror, fantasy, adventure	
D E C E M B E R	25	Muslim Magnum .357: To Serve and Protect	Scenema Concept International, Viva Films	Jun Posadas (director); E.R. Ejercito and Sam Pinto	Action	
D E C E M B E R	25	My Big Bossing	Octoarts Films, MZET Productions, APT Entertainment	Joyce Bernal, Marlon Rivera, Tony Reyes (directors); Vic Sotto, Ryzza Mae Dizon, Marian Rivera, Jose Manalo, Wally Bayola, and Paolo Ballesteros	Comedy, fantasy, adventure	
D E C E M B E R	25	The Amazing Praybeyt Benjamin	Star Cinema, Viva Films	Wenn V. Deramas (director); Vice Ganda, Richard Yap, Roderick Paulate, Alex Gonzaga, James "Bimby" Aquino-Yap, Karla Estrada, and Negi	Comedy	
D E C E M B E R	25	Shake, Rattle & Roll XV	Regal Entertainment	Perci Intalan-Lana, Jerrold Tarog, Dondon Santos (directors); Dennis Trillo, Carla Abellana, Lovi Poe, Matteo Guidicelli, JC de Vera, Erich Gonzales, and John Lapus	Horror, suspense	

== Awards ==
=== Local ===
The following first list shows the Best Picture winners at the four major film awards: FAMAS Awards, Gawad Urian Awards, Luna Awards and Star Awards; and at the three major film festivals: Metro Manila Film Festival, Cinemalaya and Cinema One Originals. The second list shows films with the most awards won from the three major film awards and a breakdown of their total number of awards per award ceremony.

Award/festival	Best Picture		Ref.
63rd FAMAS Awards	Bonifacio: Ang Unang Pangulo		
38th Gawad Urian Awards	Mula sa Kung Ano ang Noon		
33rd Luna Awards	Was not held		
31st Star Awards for Movies	Bonifacio: Ang Unang Pangulo	The Janitor	
25th Young Critics Circle Citations	No award for Best Film was given.		
40th Metro Manila Film Festival	Bonifacio: Ang Unang Pangulo	Magkakabaung	
10th Cinemalaya Independent Film Festival	Bwaya	Kasal	
10th Cinema One Originals Film Festival	Violator		

Film	Total	FAMAS	Urian	Star
Bonifacio: Ang Unang Pangulo	13	5	0	8
The Trial	7	3	0	4
The Janitor	5	0	0	5
Magkakabaung	4	1	2	1
Mula sa Kung Ano ang Noon	4	0	4	0
Asintado	3	2	0	1
Dementia	3	0	1	2

=== International ===
The following list shows Filipino films (released in 2014) which were nominated or won awards at international industry-based awards and FIAPF-accredited competitive film festivals.

Award/festival	Category	Nominee	Result	Ref.
8th Asian Film Awards	Best Actress	Eugene Domingo, Mga Kuwentong Barbero (Barber's Tales)	Nominated	
9th Asian Film Awards	Best Director	Lav Diaz, Mula sa Kung Ano ang Noon (From What Is Before)	Nominated	
8th Asia Pacific Screen Awards	Best Performance by an Actress	Nora Aunor, Hustisya (Justice)	Nominated	
8th Asia Pacific Screen Awards	Best Screenplay	Giancarlo Abrahan, Dagitab (Sparks)	Nominated	
9th Asia Pacific Screen Awards	Best Performance by an Actress	Shamaine Buencamino, Lorna	Nominated	
2nd ASEAN International Film Festival and Awards	Best Actor	Allen Dizon, Magkakabaung	Nominated	
2nd ASEAN International Film Festival and Awards	Best Supporting Actor	Nico Antonio, Red	Nominated	
2nd ASEAN International Film Festival and Awards	Best Film Photography	Bernard Dacanay, Red	Nominated	
67th Locarno Film Festival	Golden Leopard	Lav Diaz, Mula sa Kung Ano ang Noon (From What Is Before)	Won	
26th Tokyo International Film Festival	Best Actress	Eugene Domingo, Mga Kuwentong Barbero (Barber's Tales)	Won	

== See also ==
- 2014 in the Philippines
- List of 2014 box office number-one films in the Philippines
