= 44th Gawad Urian Awards =

Award ceremony for Philippine films of 2020

- Date: October 21, 2021
- Site: Virtual awards ceremony

Highlights
- Best Picture: Aswang
- Most awards: Aswang (4)
- Most nominations: Midnight in a Perfect World and Watch List (11)

The 44th Gawad Urian Awards (Filipino: Ika-44 na Gawad Urian) is held on October 21, 2021, honoring the best of Philippine cinema in 2020. Established in 1976, the Gawad Urian Awards highlights the best of Philippine cinema as decided by the Filipino Film Critics. Due to the restrictions of the COVID-19 pandemic, the awarding ceremony is done virtually and livestreamed in the organization's YouTube channel. Aside from the traditional awards, the organization also chooses to honor some of the best films and performers over the past decade. The Natatanging Gawad Urian, an equivalent to the Lifetime Achievement Award, is conferred to venerated filmmaker, Lav Diaz.

The Best Picture award is given to Alyx Ayn Arumpac's Aswang, a documentary about President Rodrigo Duterte's national drug war. It is the first documentary film to win the award.

== Winners and nominees ==
Winners are listed first and bolded.

Best Picture Pinakamahusay na Pelikula	Best Director Pinakamahusay na Direksyon
**Aswang**; A Thousand Cuts; Hayop Ka!; Kintsugi; Lahi, Hayop; Midnight in a Perfect World; Watch List	**Alyx Ayn Arumpac – Aswang**; Antoinette Jadaone – Fan Girl; Avid Liongoren – Hayop Ka!; Ben Rekhi – Watch List; Dodo Dayao – Midnight in a Perfect World; Dolly Dulu – The Boy Foretold by the Stars; Irene Villamor – On Vodka, Beers, and Regrets; Joselito Altarejos – Memories of Forgetting; Lav Diaz – Lahi, Hayop; Lawrence Fajardo – Kintsugi; Ramona S. Diaz – A Thousand Cuts
Best Actor Pinakamahusay na Pangunahing Aktor	Best Actress Pinakamahusay na Pangunahing Aktres
**Nanding Josef – Lahi, Hayop**; Adrian Lindayag – The Boy Foretold by the Stars; Elijah Canlas – He Who Is Without Sin; Enchong Dee – Alter Me; JC Santos – On Vodka, Beers, and Regrets; Keann Johnson – The Boy Foretold by the Stars; Noel Escondo – Memories of Forgetting; Zanjoe Marudo – Malaya	**Alessandra de Rossi – Watch List**; Bela Padilla – On Vodka, Beers, and Regrets; Charlie Dizon – Fan Girl; Cristine Reyes – UnTrue; Glaiza de Castro – Midnight in a Perfect World; Jasmine Curtis-Smith – Alter Me; Lovi Poe – Malaya; Shaina Magdayao – Tagpuan; Sue Ramirez – Finding Agnes
Best Supporting Actor Pinakamahusay na Pangalawang Aktor	Best Supporting Actress Pinakamahusay na Pangalawang Aktres
**Micko Laurente – Watch List**; Dino Pastrano – Midnight in a Perfect World; Enzo Pineda – He Who Is Without Sin; Jake Macapagal – Watch List; Jess Mendoza – Watch List	**Dexter Doria – Memories of Forgetting**; **Hazel Orencio – Lahi, Hayop**; Bing Pimentel – Midnight in a Perfect World; Lolita Carbon – Lahi, Hayop; Sandy Andolong – Finding Agnes
Best Screenplay Pinakamahusay na Dulang Pampelikula	Best Cinematography Pinakamahusay na Sinematograpiya
**Lahi, Hayop**; Hayop Ka!; Kintsugi; Memories of Forgetting; Midnight in a Perfect World; On Vodka, Beers, and Regrets; The Boy Foretold by the Stars; Watch List	**Aswang**; Alter Me; Fan Girl; Finding Agnes; Kintsugi; Lahi, Hayop; Magikland; Malaya; Memories of Forgetting; Midnight in a Perfect World; The Boy Foretold by the Stars; UnTrue; Watch List
Best Production Design Pinakamahusay na Disenyong Pamproduksyon	Best Editing Pinakamahusay na Editing
**Memories of Forgetting**; Alter Me; Finding Agnes; Kintsugi; Magikland; Malaya; Midnight in a Perfect World; On Vodka, Beers, and Regrets; UnTrue; Watch List	**Memories of Forgetting**; A Thousand Cuts; Alter Me; Aswang; Hayop Ka!; He Who Is Without Sin; Kintsugi; Magikland; Midnight in a Perfect World; Watch List
Best Music Pinakamahusay na Musika	Best Sound Pinakamahusay na Tunog
**The Boy Foretold by the Stars**; Fan Girl; Hayop Ka!; Midnight in a Perfect World; On Vodka, Beers, and Regrets; The Highest Peak	**Midnight in a Perfect World**; Aswang; Fan Girl; Hayop Ka!; Kintsugi; Lahi, Hayop; Watch List
Best Short Film Pinakamahusay na Maikling Pelikula	Best Documentary Pinakamahusay na Dokyumentaryo
**Ola**; Ang Bahagharing Uhaw sa Ulan; Dad-aan Na; Isang Daa't Isang Mariposa; My Father Is an Astro-Not; Next Picture; Noontime Drama; Pabasa Kan Pasyon; Yawyaw ni JP	**Aswang**; A House in Pieces; A Thousand Cuts; Buklog; Elehiya sa Paglimot; Masterpiece
Best Animated Film Pinakamahusay na Animasyon
**Hayop Ka!**

== Special Award ==
=== Natatanging Gawad Urian ===
- Lav Diaz

=== Gawad Dekada Para sa Mga Natatanging Pelikula* ===
- Ang Paglalakbay ng mga Bituin sa Gabing Madilim – Arnel Mardoquio
- Ang Pagsayaw ng Dalawang Kaliwang Paa – Alvin Yapan
- Babae at Baril – Rae Red
- Baboy Halas – Bagane Fiola
- Balangiga: Howling Wilderness – Khavn
- BuyBust – Erik Matti
- Damgo ni Eleuteria – Remton Siega Zuasola
- Norte: Hangganan ng Kasaysayan – Lav Diaz
- Respeto – Treb Monteras
- Tu Pug Imatuy – Arnel Barbarona
- Women of the Weeping River – Sheron Dayoc

=== Gawad Dekada Para sa Mga Natatanging Aktor at Aktres* ===
- Alessandra de Rossi
- Angeli Bayani
- John Lloyd Cruz
- Nora Aunor

*These awards are bestowed to celebrate the previous decade in films.

== Multiple nominations and awards ==
Films that received multiple nominations
Nominations	Films
11	Midnight in a Perfect World
11	Watch List
8	Lahi, Hayop
7	Hayop Ka!
7	Kintsugi
7	Memories of Forgetting
6	Aswang
6	On Vodka, Beers, and Regrets
6	The Boy Foretold by the Stars
5	Alter Me
5	Fan Girl
4	A Thousand Cuts
4	Finding Agnes
4	Malaya
3	He Who Is Without Sin
3	Magikland
3	UnTrue

Films that won multiple awards
Awards	Film
4	Aswang
3	Lahi, Hayop
3	Memories of Forgetting
2	Watch List
