= 32nd Gawad Urian Awards =

2009 Philippine film awards ceremony

- Date: September 19, 2009
- Site: Cultural Center of the Philippines, Pasay City

Highlights
- Best Picture: Serbis
- Most awards: Serbis (4)
- Most nominations: Yanggaw (11)

The 32nd Gawad Urian Awards (Filipino: Ika-32 na Gawad Urian) is held on September 19, 2009. It honors the best Philippine films of 2008. Dominated mostly by independent films, the ceremony is held at Tanghalang Aurelio Tolentino, Cultural Center of the Philippines in Pasay City. Brillante Mendoza repeats his victory from the previous year by winning Best Director again–he will go on to win the following year and achieve a historic threepeat in the category. Peque Gallaga, the celebrated filmmaker behind films like Oro, Plata, Mata and Shake, Rattle & Roll III, wins the Natatanging Gawad Urian Award. Established in 1976, the Gawad Urian Awards highlights the best of Philippine cinema as decided by the Filipino Film Critics.

== Winners and nominees ==
Winners are listed first and bolded.

Best Picture Pinakamahusay na Pelikula	Best Director Pinakamahusay na Direksyon
**Serbis – Centerstage Productions**; Boses – Casa San Miguel; Hunghong sa Yuta – Brothers of the Sacred Heart Youth Ministry; Imburnal – Cinema One Originals and Creative Programs; Jay – Cinemalaya; Melancholia – Sine Olivia; Yanggaw – Cinema One Originals and Creative Programs	**Brillante Mendoza** **– Serbis**; Adolfo Alix Jr. – Imoral; Arnel Mardoquio – Hunghong sa Yuta; Ellen Ongkeko-Marfil – Boses; Francis Xavier Pasion – Jay; Lav Diaz – Melancholia; Richard Somes – Yanggaw; Sherad Anthony Sanchez – Imburnal; Tara Illenberger – Brutus
Best Actor Pinakamahusay na Pangunahing Aktor	Best Actress Pinakamahusay na Pangunahing Aktres
**Ronnie Lazaro – Yanggaw**; Baron Geisler – Jay; Coco Martin – Daybreak; Julian Duque – Boses; Neil Ryan Sese – Huling Pasada; Paulo Rivero – Daybreak; Perry Dizon – Melancholia; Timothy Malabot – Brutus	**Mylene Dizon – 100**; Angeli Bayani – Melancholia; Anita Linda – Adela; Boots Anson-Roa – Lovebirds; Gina Pareño – Serbis; Jaclyn Jose – Serbis; Judy Ann Santos – Ploning; Rhea Medina – Brutus
Best Supporting Actor Pinakamahusay na Pangalawang Aktor	Best Supporting Actress Pinakamahusay na Pangalawang Aktres
**Coco Martin – Jay**; Archie Alemania – Baby Angelo; Julio Diaz – Serbis; Roeder Camanag – Melancholia; Yul Servo – Brutus	**Aleera Montalla – Yanggaw**; Agot Isidro – Huling Pasada; Flor Salanga – Jay; Katherine Luna – Imoral; Tessie Tomas – 100; Tetchie Agbayani – Yanggaw
Best Screenplay Pinakamahusay na Dulang Pampelikula	Best Cinematography Pinakamahusay na Sinematograpiya
**Jay – Francis Xavier Pasion**; Boses – Froilan Medina & Rody Vera; Hunghong sa Yuta – Arnel Mardoquio; Melancholia – Lav Diaz; Serbis – Armando Bing Lao & Boots Agbayani Pastor; Yanggaw – Richard Somes & Dwight Gaston	**Serbis – Odyssey Flores**; Adela; Boses; Brutus; Huling Pasada; Hunghong sa Yuta; Imburnal; Melancholia; Ploning; Yanggaw
Best Production Design Pinakamahusay na Disenyong Pamproduksyon	Best Editing Pinakamahusay na Editing
**Serbis – Benjamin Padero & Carlo Tabije**; Baby Angelo; Hunghong sa Yuta; Imburnal; Jay; Melancholia; Ploning; Yanggaw	**Jay – Francis Pasion, Kats Serraon & Chuck Gutierrez**; 100; Huling Pasada; Imburnal; Motorcycle; Ploning; Serbis; Yanggaw
Best Music Pinakamahusay na Musika	Best Sound Pinakamahusay na Tunog
**Hunghong sa Yuta – Popong Landero**; Boses; Brutus; Concerto; Imburnal; Kolorete; Ploning; Yanggaw	**Yanggaw – Joey Santos & Von De Guzman**; Adela; Boses; Melancholia; Ploning; Serbis; Yanggaw

== Special Award ==
=== Natatanging Gawad Urian ===
- Peque Gallaga

=== Best Short Film ===
- Andong, directed by Milo Tolentino
