= Gawad Urian Lifetime Achievement Award =

- Awarded for: "individuals who have made significant contributions to the growth and development of Filipino cinematic art."
- Country: Philippines
- Presented by: Manunuri ng Pelikulang Pilipino
- First award: 1977
- Currently held by: Dante Rivero (2025)
- Website: manunuri.com

The Gawad Urian Lifetime Achievement Award (Filipino: Natatanging Gawad Urian) is an honorary award instituted in 1977 that is presented annually by the Manunuri ng Pelikulang Pilipino to "movie actors, directors, writers, cameramen, musicians, technicians and cosmetic artists whose lifework can be held up as a standard of excellence for all."

== Recipients ==
Recipients of the Gawad Urian Lifetime Achievement Award
Year (Note: Indicates the year of ceremony. Each year is linked to the article about the awards held that year, wherever possible.)	Image	Recipient	Occupation(s)	Ref.
1977	—N/a	Manuel de Leon	Producer	
1978		Gerardo de Leon	Director	
1979		Manuel Conde	Director and producer	
1980	—N/a	Manuel Silos	Director	
1981		Lamberto Avellana	Director	
1982		Anita Linda	Actress	
1983	—N/a	Luis Nolasco	Production manager	
1984	—N/a	Mike Accion	Cinematographer	
1985	—N/a	William Smith	Sound Engineer	
1986	—N/a	Tito Arévalo	Actor	
1987		Rosa Rosal	Actress	
1988	—N/a	—N/a	—N/a	—N/a
1989	—N/a	—N/a	—N/a	—N/a
1990	—N/a	Richard Aberlardo	Director	
1991	—N/a	Susana de Guzman	Director	
1992		Mary Walter	Actress	
1993		Levi Celerio	Film score composer	
1994		Leopoldo Salcedo	Actor	
1995		Eddie Romero	Director	
1996	—N/a	Pancho Magalona	Actor	
1997	—N/a	Felipe Sacdalan	Cinematographer	
1998		Dolphy	Actor	
1999	—N/a	Mona Lisa	Actress	
2000	—N/a	Nida Blanca	Actress	
2001	—N/a	Manahan Sisters	Make-up artists	
2002		Fernando Poe Jr.	Actor	
2003		Ricky Lee	Writer	
2004		Gloria Romero	Actress	
2005	—N/a	Jess Navarro	Editor	
2006		Eddie Garcia	Actor	
2007	—N/a	Marichu Vera Perez-Maceda	Producer	
2008		Kidlat Tahimik	Director	
2009		Peque Gallaga	Director	
2010		Armida Siguion-Reyna	Actress and producer	
2011		Jose Lacaba	Screenwriter	
2012	—N/a	Rody Lacap	Cinematographer	
2013		Mila del Sol	Actress	
2014		Mike de Leon	Director	
2015		Nora Aunor	Actress	
2016	—N/a	Romy Vitug	Cinematographer	
2017		Vilma Santos	Actress	
2018	—N/a	Winston Raval	Film score composer	
2019	—N/a	Gloria Sevilla	Actress	
2020	—N/a	Fiel Corrales Zabat	Production designer	
2021		Lav Diaz	Director	
2022		Roque Federizon Lee	Animator	
2023		Jaime Fabregas	Actor and film score composer	
2024	—N/a	Hilda Koronel	Actress	
2025		Dante Rivero	Actor	
