= Digital Tour =

- Created by: ABS-CBN
- Developed by: ABS-CBN News and Current Affairs
- Presented by: Iya Yotoko; Manu Sandejas; Carlo Ledesma; JC Gonzalez; Chunchi Soler; Archie Alemania
- Country of origin: Philippines
- Original language: Filipino
- No. of episodes: n/a (airs every Sunday)

Production
- Camera setup: Multiple-camera setup

Original release
- Network: Studio 23
- Release: 1999 – July 22, 2007

Digital Tour is a Philippine television show broadcast by Studio 23 which was aired from 1999 to July 22, 2007.

== Hosts ==
Final hosts

- Iya Yotoko (1999-2007)
- Manu Sandejas (2004-2007)
- Archie Alemania (2004-2007)

Former hosts

- JC Gonzalez (1999-2003)
- Carlo Ledesma (2003-2004)
- Chunchi Soler (2003-2004)

== See also ==
- List of programs aired by Studio 23
- Studio 23
