= Aswang (2019 film) =

Filipino documentary film by Alex Arumpac

- Directed by: Alyx Arumpac
- Produced by: Armi Rae Cacanindin; Alyx Arumpac
- Narrated by: Giancarlo Abrahan; Anne Fabini; Alyx Arumpac
- Cinematography: Alyx Arumpac; Tanya Haurylchyk
- Edited by: Fatima Bianchi; Anne Fabini
- Music by: Teresa Barrozo
- Production company: Cinematografica; Les Films l'oeil Sauvage; Razor Film Produktion; Stray Dog Productions
- Release date: November 21, 2019 (IDFA)
- Running time: 85 minutes
- Country: Philippines; France; Germany; Norway
- Language: Filipino

Aswang is a 2019 documentary film directed by Alyx Arumpac. It covers the first two years of the war on drugs of President Rodrigo Duterte.

== Premise ==
Aswang features the "nightcrawlers" a group of photojournalists in Metro Manila documenting the killings of people suspected to be drug dealers and users under the war on drugs of President Rodrigo Duterte. Among these photojournalist is Redemptorist lay brother Jun Santiago supports the families of the victims as well as covers the protests against the campaign.

Jomari an impoverish youth learns of the murder of Kian de los Santos, whom he considers as his older brother figure. Jomari lives by himself since his parents are detained for drug use.

== Production ==
Aswang was directed by Alyx Ayn Arumpac and is an international co-production by Cinematografica (Philippines), Les Films l'oeil Sauvage (France), Stray Dog Productions (Norway), and Razor Film Produktion (Germany)

Work on Aswang began in 2016 where it started as a self-funded venture. The production team had support from the Film Development Council of the Philippines (FDCP) as early as 2017 which partially funded the project via its International Film Studies Assistance Program (IFSAP). The IFSAP enabled the team to attend the International Documentary Film Festival Amsterdam (IDFA) Forum where they were able to present the pitch for Aswang to potential funders and producers. In 2018, the film received 40,000 euros for Europe: International Co-production from the IDFA Bertha Fund

== Release ==
Aswang made its world premier on November 21, 2019, at the International Documentary Film Festival Amsterdam.

The film was supposed to make its Philippine debut at the Daang Dokyu documentary film festival on March 16, 2020. The event was distrupted by the COVID-19 pandemic. Instead a limited online screening was held for the Philippine audience on July 11, 2020.

== Accolades ==
Aswang is noted for being the first ever documentary to win Best Picture in the 2020 FAMAS Awards. It is also the first documentary to win Best Picture in the 44th Gawad Urian Awards held in 2021.

Year	Award	Category	Recipient	Result
2020	68th FAMAS Awards	Best Picture	Aswang	Won
2020	68th FAMAS Awards	Best Documentary Film	Aswang	Won
2020	68th FAMAS Awards	Best Cinematography	Alyx Arumpac and Tanya Haurylchyk	Won
2020	68th FAMAS Awards	Best Editing	Fatima Bianchi and Anne Fabini	Won
2020	68th FAMAS Awards	Best Sound	Mikko Quizon, John Michael Perez and Akritchalerm Kalayanamitr	Nominated
2021	44th Gawad Urian Awards	Best Film	Aswang	Won
2021	44th Gawad Urian Awards	Best Director	Alyx Arumpac	Won
2021	44th Gawad Urian Awards	Best Cinematography	Alyx Ayn G. Arumpac and Tanya Haurylchyk	Won
