= Sandy Andolong =

Filipino actress

- Born: Alexandra Pinga Andolong; January 16, 1959 (age 67); Santa Cruz, Manila, Philippines
- Occupations: Actress; TV producer
- Years active: 1978–present
- Spouse: Christopher de Leon (m. 2001)
- Children: 5 (including Gabriel)

Alexandra "Sandy" Andolong-de Leon (born Alexandra Pinga Andolong; January 16, 1959) is a Filipina actress and producer. She is mostly seen on the TV programs made by GMA Network and ABS-CBN, especially on dramas and sitcoms.

== Career ==
Andolong started her career starring in the acclaimed films Oro, Plata, Mata and Moral, the latter in which she won Best Supporting Actress at the 1983 FAMAS Awards.

In 2007, her kidney problems reoccurred, which required her to take a break from acting for six months. She got back to work the following year, playing a villain role on Gaano Kadalas ang Minsan.

In 2012, she got to lead an episode of MMK alongside her husband Christopher de Leon. From 2014 up to 2019, she was on the sitcom Home Sweetie Home until she joined the afternoon series Dahil sa Pag-ibig. In 2021, Andolong was nominated for another Gawad Urian award for Best Supporting Actress for her role in Finding Agnes. In 2024, she was one of the presenters during the 72nd FAMAS Awards.

== Personal life ==
Sandy Andolong was born Alexandra Pinga Andolong on January 16, 1959, in North General Hospital (now José R. Reyes Memorial Medical Center), Santa Cruz, Manila.

Andolong is married to Christopher de Leon, whom she has five children Rafael, Miguel, Gabriel, Mariel and Mica. She is also the stepmother to Lotlot, Ian, Matet, Kiko and Keneth de Leon. They renewed their vows in 2019. In March 2020, they celebrated their 40th anniversary, as the couple got married in 2001 but they have been together since 1980.

In 2003, Andolong was diagnosed with multiple ailments involving her kidneys, large intestines, gallbladder, uterus, and pituitary gland. These were operated on, which were successful. For the following years, her kidneys were on constant medication and she also hired a team of doctors to manage her kidney. By 2015, she had to undergo a kidney transplant, which was successful. In 2020, Andolong went under quarantine after her husband tested positive to COVID-19. Her husband recovered from the disease and was released from the hospital on March 24 after having tested negative.

== Filmography ==
=== Film ===
	Title	Role
1978	Ikaw ay Akin	(as Andrea Andolong) Sandy
1979	Salawahan	(as Andrea Andolong) Sylvia
1981	Highschool Scandal	(as Lyn Paredes)
1980	Aguila	(as Andrea Andolong) Farida
1980	Kakabakaba Ka Ba?	Nancy
1982	Oro, Plata, Mata	Margarita "Maggie" Ojeda
1982	Schoolgirls	Rica
1982	Batch '81	Tina
1982	Amo	Norma
1982	Katas ng Langis	-
1982	Moral	Sylvia
1983	Broken Marriage	–
1984	Sa Hirap at Ginhawa	Tessie Ventura
1985	Muling Buksan ang Puso	–
1986	Nakagapos na Puso	Beth Graciano
1987	Victor Corpuz	–
1992	Bakit Labis Kitang Mahal	Matita
1998	Mother Ignacia: Ang Uliran	Mother Ignacia
2001	American Adobo	Emma
2001	Trip	Joboy's mother
2002	9 Mornings	Sister Susana
2003	Ngayong Nandito Ka	Naida Cruz
2005	Maging Akin Muli	Ina Santos
2006	Tulay	–
2006	Moments of Love	Elma
2008	My Big Love	Mama Bing
2013	My Lady Boss	Myrna Lontoc
2017	Northern Lights	Juliet
2018	First Love	Bernadette
2020	Finding Agnes	Agnes Rivero

=== Television ===
Year	Title	Role
1981–1997	GMA Supershow	Herself
1987–1990	Hapi House!	Sandy
1998	Ganyan Kita Kamahal	Teresa
2000–2003	Arriba, Arriba!	Isabel Arriba
2003–2004	Twin Hearts	Frida Villanueva
2004–2005	Spirits	Paz
2005	O, Mare Ko!	Herself
2005	Magpakailanman: The Jose and Permelita Claro Story	Permelita Claro
2005	Mars Ravelo's Darna	Prospera
2006	Fantastikids	Melinda
2006	Pinakamamahal	Sister Agatha Lucero
2007	Asian Treasures	Araceli
2007	Pangarap na Bituin	Jade Ledesma-Gomez
2008	Sine Novela: Gaano Kadalas ang Minsan	Dra. Gloria Cervantes
2009	Zorro	Maria Manalo
2009	Stairway to Heaven	Zoila Fuentebella
2010	Sine Novela: Gumapang Ka sa Lusak	Rowena Tuazon-Gualto
2010	Endless Love	Katherine Dizon
2010	Bantatay	Madame Alma
2011	Pablo S. Gomez's Mutya	Madame Delilah Sardenas
2012	Maalaala Mo Kaya: School Uniform	Josephine
2012	Dahil sa Pag-ibig	Cindy Velasco-Valderama
2012	Kung Ako'y Iiwan Mo	Belen Trinidad
2012–2013	Pahiram ng Sandali	Thea Santiago
2013	Anna Karenina	Doña Carmela Monteclaro
2014–2019	Home Sweetie Home	Loida "Nanay Loi" Matahimik
2015	Pangako sa 'Yo	Myrna Santos-De Jesus
2019	Maalaala Mo Kaya: Family Portrait	Gloria Manalang-Angara
2019	Dahil sa Pag-ibig	Nanette Fajardo
2021	First Yaya	Edna Reyes
2022	First Lady	Edna Reyes
2023	Magandang Dilag	Luisa De Jesus
2024	Magpakailanman:"My Very Special Son: The Candy Pangilinan Story"	Teodorica Espiritu
2025	Akusada	Amalia Astor
2025–2026	Roja	Concepcion "Conney" Alegre-Murillo
2026	Taskforce Firewall	Juanita Mallari

=== Others ===
Year	Title	Role	Note
2002	Bugso	TV Producer	
2005	Glam: The Smart Gold 2005 Red Carpet Special	Herself	"Glam: The Philippine Academy Red Carpet Special" – Philippines
2009	Maalaala Mo Kaya: Medal of Valor	Herself	ABS-CBN

== Awards and nominations ==
Year	Award	Category/Recipient(s)	Result
1980	Gawad Urian	Best Supporting Actress (Pinakamahusay na Pangalawang Aktres) for: Menor de edad (1979)	Nominated
1983	FAMAS	Best Supporting Actress for: Moral (1982)	Won
2021	Gawad Urian	Best Supporting Actress (Pinakamahusay na Pangalawang Aktres) for: Finding Agnes (2020)	Nominated
