= 37th Gawad Urian Awards =

2014 Philippine film awards ceremony

- Official poster featuring Pancho Magalona and Mona Fernandez in Gerardo de Leon's Hanggang sa Dulo ng Daigdig (1958).
- Date: June 17, 2014
- Site: Dolphy Theater, South Triangle, Quezon City
- Hosted by: Ai-Ai de las Alas; Butch Francisco; Bianca Gonzalez; Piolo Pascual

Highlights
- Best Film: Norte, Hangganan ng Kasaysayan
- Most awards: Norte, Hangganan ng Kasaysayan (4)
- Most nominations: Dukit; Norte, Hangganan ng Kasaysayan; Porno (10)

Television coverage
- Network: Cinema One

The 37th Gawad Urian Awards or Ika-37 na Gawad Urian were held on June 17, 2014, at the Dolphy Theater in Quezon City. They honored the best Filipino films for the year 2013.

Nominations were announced on April 29, 2014, at a press conference. Rody Vera received triple nominations in the Best Screenplay category. Angel Aquino, Adjani Arumpac and Corinne de San Jose received double nominations in Best Supporting Actress, Best Documentary and Best Sound respectively. On the other hand, Armando Lao received the most number of nominations with four.

Norte, Hangganan ng Kasaysayan dominated the ceremony which received 4 awards, including Best Film. The Natatanging Gawad Urian was supposed to be given to Mike de Leon but he declined to receive the award. This is only the second time in which this special award was not given, the first being in 1989. Instead, they paid tribute to late National Artist for Film Gerardo de Leon.

== Winners and nominees ==
Best Film Pinakamahusay na Pelikula	Best Direction Pinakamahusay na Direksyon
Norte, Hangganan ng Kasaysayan; Ang Kwento ni Mabuti; Badil; Dukit; Ekstra; On the Job; Porno; Riddles of My Homecoming; Transit	Hannah Espia – Transit; Whammy Alcazaren – Islands; Adolfo Alix Jr. – Porno; Mes de Guzman – Ang Kwento ni Mabuti; Lav Diaz – Norte, Hangganan ng Kasaysayan; Peque Gallaga & Lore Reyes – Sonata; Jeffrey Jeturian – Ekstra; Armando Lao – Dukit; Arnel Mardoquio – Riddles of My Homecoming; Erik Matti – On the Job; Chito Roño – Badil; Alvin Yapan – Mga Anino ng Kahapon
Best Actor Pinakamahusay na Pangunahing Aktor	Best Actress Pinakamahusay na Pangunahing Aktres
Joel Torre – On the Job; Mark Gil – Philippino Story; Jhong Hilario – Badil; Mimi Juareza – Quick Change; Sid Lucero – Norte, Hangganan ng Kasaysayan; Alex Medina – Babagwa; Ping Medina – Transit	Angeli Bayani – Norte, Hangganan ng Kasaysayan; Nora Aunor – Ang Kwento ni Mabuti; Rustica Carpio – Ano ang Kulay ng mga Nakalimutang Pangarap?; Eugene Domingo – Instant Mommy; Cherie Gil – Sonata; Agot Isidro – Mga Anino ng Kahapon; Teri Malvar – Ang Huling Cha-Cha ni Anita; Vilma Santos – Ekstra; Lorna Tolentino – Burgos; Vivian Velez – Bendor
Best Supporting Actor Pinakamahusay na Pangalawang Aktor	Best Supporting Actress Pinakamahusay na Pangalawang Aktres
Jun-jun Quintana – Philippino Story; Art Acuña – Kabisera; Archie Alemania – Norte, Hangganan ng Kasaysayan; John Arcilla – Metro Manila; Carlo Aquino – Porno; Victor Basa – Lauriana; Joey Marquez – On the Job; Cesar Montano – Alamat ni China Doll; Bor Ocampo – Dukit; Yul Servo – Porno	Angel Aquino – Ang Huling Cha-Cha ni Anita; Angel Aquino – Porno; Mitch Smith – Angustia; Ruby Ruiz – Ekstra; Jasmine Curtis-Smith – Transit; Raquel Villavicencio – Dukit
Best Screenplay Pinakamahusay na Dulang Pampelikula	Best Cinematography Pinakamahusay na Sinematograpiya
Lav Diaz & Rody Vera – Norte, Hangganan ng Kasaysayan; Giancarlo Abrahan & Hannah Espia – Transit; Ralston Jover – Porno; Armando Lao & Honeylyn Joy Alipio – Dukit; Jason Paul Laxamana – Babagwa; Rody Vera – Badil; Rody Vera – Death March; Michiko Yamamoto & Erik Matti – On the Job	Lauro Rene Manda – Norte, Hangganan ng Kasaysayan; Albert Banzon – Porno; Arnel Barbarona, Bordie Carillo & McRobert Nacario – Riddles of My Homecoming; Francis Ricardo Buhay III – On the Job; Ber Cruz & Lyle Nemenzo Sacris – Transit; Diego Marx Dobles, Triztan Garcia, Jeffrey Icawat & Bruno Tiotuico – Dukit; Sasha Palomares – Islands
Best Production Design Pinakamahusay na Disenyong Pamproduksyon	Best Editing Pinakamahusay na Editing
Adolfo Alix Jr. – Porno; Leo Abaya & Olga Marie Marquez – Dukit; Perry Dizon – Riddles of My Homecoming; Junjun Montelibano – Sonata; Ericson Navarro – Ekstra; Kip Oebanda – Shift; Richard Somes – On the Job	Chuck Gutierrez – Riddles of My Homecoming; Aleksander Castañeda – Porno; Lav Diaz – Norte, Hangganan ng Kasaysayan; Diego Marx Dobles – Dukit; Jay Halili – On the Job; Benjamin Tolentino & Hannah Espia – Transit
Best Music Pinakamahusay na Musika	Best Sound Pinakamahusay na Tunog
Emerson Texon – Sonata; Nonong Buencamino – Lauriana; Perry Dizon – Norte, Hangganan ng Kasaysayan; Armando Lao – Dukit; Gauss Obenza – Riddles of My Homecoming	Corinne de San Jose – On the Job; Arnel Barbarona – Riddles of My Homecoming; Mes de Guzman – Ang Kwento ni Mabuti; Corinne de San Jose – Norte, Hangganan ng Kasaysayan; Albert Michael Idioma – Porno; Armando Lao – Dukit; Mark Locsin – Death March; Addiss Tabong & Wild Sound – Ekstra
Best Short Film Pinakamahusay na Maikling Pelikula	Best Documentary Pinakamahusay na Dokyumentaryo
Zig Dulay – Missing; Giancarlo Abrahan – May Dinadala; Glenmark Doromal – Ang Walay Kahumanang Adlaw; Sari Estrada – Asan si Lolo Mê?; Joris Fernandez – Indayog ng Nayatamak; Paolo O'Hara – The Houseband's Wife; Xeph Suarez – Con Enfermedad y Buen Salud; J.E. Tiglao – Onang	Adjani Arumpac – Nanay Mameng; Patrick Alcedo – Ati-atihan Lives; Rica Arevalo – The Privileged Migrants; Adjani Arumpac – War Is a Tender Thing; Baby Ruth Villarama – Jazz in Love

== Multiple nominations and awards ==
Nominations	Film
10	Dukit
10	Norte, Hangganan ng Kasaysayan
10	Porno
9	On the Job
7	Riddles of My Homecoming
7	Transit
6	Ekstra
4	Ang Kwento ni Mabuti
4	Badil
4	Sonata
2	Ang Huling Cha-Cha ni Anita
2	Babagwa
2	Death March
2	Islands
2	Lauriana
2	Mga Anino ng Kahapon
2	Philippino Story

Awards	Film
4	Norte, Hangganan ng Kasaysayan
2	On the Job
