= Adrian Lindayag =

Filipino actor and theater performer

- Born: May 8, 1995 (age 31); Philippines
- Occupations: Actor; singer; theater artist
- Years active: 2015–present
- Agent: Star Magic – Polaris
- Spouse: Michael Dychiao (m. 2025)
- Father: Roderick Lindayag
- Website: Adrian Lindayag

Adrian Lindayag is a Filipino actor, singer, and theater performer known for his work in film, television, and stage musicals. He gained national recognition for his role in the pioneering Filipino Boys’ Love (BL) film The Boy Foretold by the Stars and has since become a prominent voice in the performing arts and LGBTQ+ advocacy in the Philippines.

== Career ==
=== Theater ===
Lindayag's theater career took a significant leap in 2018 when he won HuGot Talent: The Search for the Next Raksta, a talent competition organized by the Philippine Educational Theater Association (PETA). This victory earned him the role of Jewel in the hit musical Rak of Aegis, marking his professional debut on a major stage.

He has since appeared in various critically acclaimed productions including Zsazsa Zaturnnah The Musical, Regine: The Fairy Godmother, and the Philippine staging of Rent, in which he played Angel—a role that held deep personal significance.

=== Television ===
Lindayag has appeared in numerous Filipino television series, including Kadenang Ginto, Maalaala Mo Kaya, and Oh My Dad!. He is known for playing emotionally resonant and socially relevant characters.

=== Film ===
In 2020, Lindayag starred as Dominic Cruz in The Boy Foretold by the Stars, the first mainstream Filipino BL film. His performance was widely praised and led to a continuation in the iWantTFC series Love Beneath the Stars. The film and series marked a turning point in Philippine LGBTQ+ representation in media, with Lindayag at the forefront.

== Personal life ==
Adrian Lindayag is the eldest son of director Roderick Lindayag.

In 2023, Lindayag publicly revealed that he has been living with HIV since 2017. He made the announcement during the press run of Rent, drawing a parallel between his personal journey and the experiences of the character Angel, a drag performer who also lives with HIV. His openness was met with support and contributed significantly to HIV awareness and destigmatization efforts in the Philippines.

In June 2025, Lindayag married his longtime partner, Michael Dychiao, in a private ceremony in New York City. The couple shared photos of the wedding on social media, garnering support and celebration from fans and colleagues.

== Advocacy ==
Lindayag is a vocal advocate for HIV awareness, LGBTQ+ rights, and mental health. Through both his work and personal life, he champions visibility and acceptance for marginalized communities.

== Discography ==
Title	Release date	Composer(s)	Album	Ref(s)
"Kaibigan"	January 11, 2021	Jhaye Cura	The Boy Foretold by the Stars soundtrack	

== Filmography ==
=== Film ===
Key
†	Denotes films that have not yet been released

Year	Title	Role	Ref
2023	Becky & Badette	Bona	
2022	An Inconvenient Love	Jobert	
2022	Kitty K7	Sunny	
2020	The Boy Foretold by the Stars	Dominic Cruz	

=== Television ===
Year	Title	Role	Ref
2026	Love, Siargao	Ariel	
2025–2024	Saving Grace	Charlie Molina	
2024	Marahuyo Project	Ricardo Matayog / "King"	
2023	Linlang	William	
2023	Simula sa Gitna	Carlo	
2023	Fit Check: Confessions of an Ukay Queen	Interviewer	
2022	Beach Bros	Candy	
2022–2021	Marry Me, Marry You	Kevin	
2021	Love Beneath the Stars	Dominic Cruz	
2021–2020	Oh My Dad!	Mikhail "Kelly" Macapangyarihan-Balderama	
2020–2018	Kadenang Ginto	Neil Andrada	
2020–2015	Maalaala Mo Kaya	Paul / Soundtrack singer	

=== Theater ===
Title	Role
Rak of Aegis	Jewel
Zsazsa Zaturnnah The Musical	
Rent	Angel
Regine: The Fairy Godmother	
Next to Normal	

== Accolades ==
Accolades received by Adrian Lindayag
Award	Year	Category	Recipient	Work	Result	Ref.
Golden Wheel Award	2025	Entertainment category	Himself		Won	
3rd Philippine LGBTQIA Icon of the Year Awards 2024	2024	Young People's Champion	Himself		Won	
FACINE 29th Filipino International Cine Festival	2021	Performance in a lead role, Silver award	Himself	The Boy Foretold by the Stars	Won	
Pinoy Rebyu Awards	2021	Best Lead Performance	Himself	The Boy Foretold by the Stars	Nominated	
3rd Laguna Excellence Awards	2021	Outstanding Indie Movie actor of the Year	Himself	The Boy Foretold by the Stars	Won	
44th Gawad Urian Awards	2021	Best Actor	Himself	The Boy Foretold by the Stars	Nominated	
Young Critics Circle	2021	Best Performance	Himself	The Boy Foretold by the Stars	Nominated	
2nd VP Choice Awards	2021	Movie Actor of the Year	Himself	The Boy Foretold by the Stars	Won	
4th EDDYS Awards	2021	Best Actor	Himself	The Boy Foretold by the Stars	Nominated	
GEMS Hiyas ng Sining	2021	Film Actor of the Year	Himself	The Boy Foretold by the Stars	Nominated	
2020 Metro Manila Film Festival	2020	Best Actor	Himself	The Boy Foretold by the Stars	Nominated	
