= Nanding Josef =

Filipino actor (born 1948)

- Born: Fernando Josef; August 1948 (age 77)
- Education: University of the Philippines Diliman
- Occupation: Actor
- Years active: 1970s–present

Fernando "Nanding" Josef (born August 1948) is a Filipino actor in theater, film and television.

== Early life ==
Fernando Josef was born in August 1948. He comes from a poor family of farmers, fisherfolk and shoemakers in Marikina. He graduated at the University of the Philippines Diliman and obtained a degree in zoology. He took up zoology, originally intended to pursue a career in medicine to help his family financially. However he decided to remain an instructor in zoology.

== Career ==
=== Acting career ===
In the 1970s, Josef joined the Philippine Educational Theater Association (PETA) after auditioning for the group's laboratory productions during the time of Lino Brocka and Cecile Guidote-Alvarez. He had various other roles within PETA. Eventually he quit being a zoology instructor and taught theater across the Philippines. This was during the Martial law era under President Ferdinand Marcos. He describes his training under PETA as having to understand the "psychological and social realities of the character" or method acting

He considers the role of Macli-ing Dulag, the Cordillera tribal leader killed for opposition to the Chico River Dam Project as his most memorable theater act.

He has become the artistic director for Tanghalang Pilipino in 2008.

Josef has also acted for television and film as well. He appeared in Walang Hanggan, Hanggang Saan, Cinco and Maalaala Mo Kaya He won Best Actor at the 44th Gawad Urian Awards in 2021 for the role of Baldo in Lahi, Hayop.

=== Government involvement ===
Fernando Josef held various position within the Philippine government. In 1986, he was chairman of the National Committee on Dramatic Arts of what was then the Presidential Commission for Culture and Arts (PCCA). He was then elected as chairman for the PCCA's successor, the National Commission on Culture and the Arts until the early 1990s.

From 1989 to 1995, Josef served as the division chief of the Coordinating Center of Dramatic Arts of the Cultural Center of the Philippines (CCP).

== Personal life ==
Josef has inherited an ancestral house in Marikina in 2018 which is dubbed as the Bahay Malaya.
