= Magkakabaung =

- Directed by: Jason Paul Laxamana
- Written by: Jason Paul Laxamana
- Produced by: Dennis Evangelista; Romeo Lindain; Romnick Tejedor
- Starring: Allen Dizon; Gladys Reyes; Chanel Latorre; Emilio Garcia
- Cinematography: Rain Yamson II
- Edited by: Jason Paul Laxamana
- Music by: Diwa de Leon
- Production company: ATD Entertainment Productions
- Release dates: August 29, 2014 (Montréal World Film Festival); December 17, 2014 (Philippines)
- Country: Philippines
- Language: Kapampangan

Magkakabaung (lit. 'The Coffin Maker'), is a 2014 Philippine drama independent film directed, written and edited by Jason Paul Laxamana. The film is known for winning the NETPAC Award for Best Asian Film at the 3rd Hanoi International Film Festival in Vietnam in November 2014. The film was also an official entry at the New Wave Category of the 40th Metro Manila Film Festival.

== Plot ==
A single father accidentally kills his eight-year-old daughter by administering the wrong medication. He finds it challenging not only to have her body buried but also to bury his culpability.

== Cast ==
- Allen Dizon as Randy
- Gladys Reyes as Mabel
- Chanel Latorre as Neri
- Emilio Garcia as Mr. Canda
- Felixia Crysten Dizon as Angeline

== Production ==
Magkakabaung was shot with Kapampangan as the primary language accompanied with English subtitles.

== Release ==
Magkakabaung was first released at the Montréal World Film Festival on August 29, 2014. It was first shown in the United States on September 11, 2014, at the Harlem International Film Festival. The Hong Kong premiere for the film was on November 12, 2014, at the Hong Kong Asian Film Festival, and in Vietnam on November 23, 2014, at the Hanoi International Film Festival. The film premiered at the Austin Film Society in the United States on December 11, 2014. Magkakabaung was released in the Philippines on December 17, 2014, as an official entry of the New Wave Category at the 40th Metro Manila Film Festival.

== Reception ==
The Network for the Promotion of Asian Cinema described the film, which was shown at the 3rd Hanoi International Film Festival, as "an emotionally rich journey that is free of sentimentality. By slowly and confidently unveiling a hero we believe in, we encounter the unseen and never doubt the truthfulness of this experience."

Quezon City Representative Winston Castelo filed House Resolution No. 1744, which sought to commend Magkakabaung's director Jason Paul Laxamana, citing, "Laxamana deserves all the praise and recognition for bringing pride, glory and honor to the country."

== Awards ==
Year	Award-giving body	Category	Recipients and nominees	Result
2014	Harlem International Film Festival Awards	Best Actor	Allen Dizon	Won
2014	Network for the Promotion of Asian Cinema (NETPAC) Award; 3rd Hanoi International Film Festival	Best Asian Film	Magkakabaung	Won
2014	Network for the Promotion of Asian Cinema (NETPAC) Award; 3rd Hanoi International Film Festival	Best Actor	Allen Dizon	Won
2014	Metro Manila Film Festival Awards	New Wave Best Picture	Magkakabaung	Won
2014	Metro Manila Film Festival Awards	New Wave Best Director	Jason Paul Laxamana	Won
2014	Metro Manila Film Festival Awards	New Wave Best Actor	Allen Dizon	Won
2015	38th Gawad Urian Awards	Best Actor	Allen Dizon	Won
2015	38th Gawad Urian Awards	Best Supporting Actress	Gladys Reyes	Won
