= The Boy Foretold by the Stars =

2020 Philippines romantic-comedy film

- Filipino theatrical release poster
- Directed by: Dolly Dulu
- Produced by: Derick Cabrido; Jodi Sta. Maria; Omar Sortijas; Jose Maria Mendoza; Patricia Coronado; Cenon Palomares
- Starring: Adrian Lindayag; Keann Johnson; Iyah Mina
- Cinematography: Marvin Reyes
- Edited by: Noah Tonga
- Music by: Pietro Marco S. Javier; Jannina Mikaela Minglanilla
- Production companies: Clever Minds Inc. The Dolly Collection; Brainstormers Lab
- Release date: December 25, 2020
- Running time: 107 minutes
- Country: Philippines
- Languages: Filipino; English

The Boy Foretold by the Stars is a 2020 Philippine coming-of-age romantic drama based on the play Ang Hangal by the film writer and director, Dolly Dulu, during his college days. It was produced by Derick Cabrido and Jodi Sta. Maria. The film revolves around the budding romance between two teenage boys in a school retreat and claims to be the first mainstream film under the "Boy's Love" (BL) genre in the Philippines.

The Boy Foretold by the Stars is one of the official entries for the 2020 Metro Manila Film Festival in December 2020. As part of the film festival which was modified as a digital event due to COVID-19 pandemic measures forcing the temporary closure of cinemas, It was made available for online streaming via Upstream. The film won three awards at the 2020 Metro Manila Film Festival; the 2nd Best Picture Award, the Best Original Soundtrack, and the Gender Sensitivity Award.

== Synopsis ==
Dominic Cruz (Adrian Lindayag) is an openly gay high school student from St. Francis Catholic School, an exclusive school for boys. He goes to Quiapo with one of his best friends, Timmy (John Leinard Ramos), to consult Baby R (Iyah Mina), a popular fortune teller renowned for her 99.5 percent accurate predictions regarding love life. During this visit, Baby R informs Dominic that he will meet his soul mate within a week, and gives him three signs to help him determine the identity of his match. Meanwhile, Luke Armada (Keann Johnson), a member of St. Francis' basketball team, has just broken up with his girlfriend Karen (Rissey Reyes) and decides to participate in the "Journey of the Lord" retreat in an attempt to move on. Dominic, who was coincidentally one of the volunteers for the retreat, was assigned as Luke's sponsor and they quickly become good friends. Baby R's three signs then become apparent and point to Luke being Dominic's match.

== Cast ==
=== Lead Cast ===
- Adrian Lindayag as Dominic Cruz
- Keann Johnson as Luke Armada
- Rissey Reyes as Karen

=== Supporting cast ===
- Iyah Mina as Baby R
- John Leinard Ramos as Timmy Ramos
- Jan Rey Escaño as Miguel Tejada
- Jemuel Satumba as Philip Barrios
- Vic Robinson III as Andoy Ramos
- Renshi De Guzman as Paul Bautista
- Kalil Almonte as Bro. Mike
- Jethro Niño Tenorio as Mr. Oyco
- Kristian Cartilla as Nigel
- Pongs Leonardo as Joseph
- Pat Ong as Jared
- Kim Caro as Back up dancer
- Angelica Renon as Back up dancer
- Dolly Dulu as Tito Bhoy, a TV talk show host.

== Release ==
The Boy Foretold by the Stars is one of the official entries for the 2020 Metro Manila Film Festival. It was released online via Upstream due to the COVID-19 pandemic measures in the Philippines.

== Soundtrack ==
All tracks are composed by Jhaye Cura.

The Boy Foretold by the Stars OST
No.	Title	Writer(s)	Artist	Length
1.	"Ulan"	Jhaye Cura	Bugoy Drillon	4:04
2.	"Kaibigan"		Adrian Lindayag	1:56
3.	"Ulan"		Nika Maristela	3:47
4.	"Kuntento"		Victor Robinson III
5.	"Simula"		Paulo Protacio

== Reception ==
The Boy Foretold received 12 award nomination for the 2020 Metro Manila Film Festival awards and won for Best OST, Gender Sensitivity Award, and 2nd Best Picture.

Year	Award-Giving Body	Category	Recipient	Result	Ref.
2020	Metro Manila Film Festival	Best Picture	The Boy Foretold by the Stars	2nd Best Picture	
2020	Metro Manila Film Festival	Best Director	Dolly Dulu	Nominated	
2020	Metro Manila Film Festival	Best Actor	Adrian Lindayag	Nominated	
2020	Metro Manila Film Festival	Best Screenplay	Dolly Dulu	Nominated	
2020	Metro Manila Film Festival	Gatpuno Memorial Award	The Boy Foretold by the Stars	Nominated	
2020	Metro Manila Film Festival	Best Supporting Actor	John Leinard Ramos	Nominated	
2020	Metro Manila Film Festival	Best Production Design	Lars Magbanua	Nominated	
2020	Metro Manila Film Festival	Best Original Theme Song	"Ulan" written by Jhaye Cura	Won	
2020	Metro Manila Film Festival	Best Sound	Pietro Marco S. Javier; Jannina Mikaela Minglanilla	Nominated	
2020	Metro Manila Film Festival	Gender Sensitivity Award	The Boy Foretold by the Stars	Won	
2020	Metro Manila Film Festival	Best Cinematography	Marvin Reyes	Nominated	
2020	Metro Manila Film Festival	Best Musical Score	Paulo Protacio	Nominated	

== Sequel ==
It was announced on February 2, 2021, that Dreamscape Entertainment, one of the divisions of ABS-CBN Corporation, will co-produce a limited television series along with Clever Minds Inc. that would serve as the sequel to the movie. The series is titled "Love Beneath The Stars". Most of the cast members of the film have returned to reprise their roles.
