= Archie Alemania =

Filipino actor, host, comedian and dancer

- Born: Archibald Nicholas Alemania; March 6, 1978 (age 48); Philippines
- Occupations: Actor (former); dancer (former); comedian (former)
- Years active: 2003–2025
- Agents: Star Magic (2007–2010; 2011–2016); Sparkle GMA Artist Center (2019–2025)
- Spouse: Gee Canlas (m. 2018)
- Partner: Mickey Ferriols (2005–2009)
- Children: 3

Archibald Nicholas Alemania (born March 6, 1978) is a Filipino actor, host, comedian and dancer.

== Career ==
Alemania has appeared in several television commercials, including ones for Chippy, San Miguel, Globe and Pop Cola. He is a talent of ABS-CBN and a member of Big Brother's Dance Group, Big Men Dance Group, and the Big Men Singers.

From 2004 to 2007, Alemania was a host for Studio 23's weekly infotainment and gag show Wazzup Wazzup, alongside Toni Gonzaga and Vhong Navarro.

He moved to GMA Network in 2010, first appearing in I Laugh Sabado. In 2011, he returned to ABS-CBN.

After 4 years, he went back to GMA Network, but continued to appear in two ABS-CBN shows (Tubig at Langis and FPJ's Ang Probinsyano). Alemania was a consistent cast member on the sketch comedy show Bubble Gang from 2016 to 2023. His first GMA Drama appearance was in D' Originals.

== Personal life ==
Alemania was previously in a live-in relationship with actress Mickey Ferriols. The couple had a son named Brent Marcus. They separated in 2009.

He married comedienne Gee Canlas in October 2018. The couple previously dated for two years but had broken up for five years. They rekindled their relationship in 2017 before eventually marrying. In 2026, Canlas announced her separation from Alemania.

== Legal issues ==
In October 2024, actress and Widows' War co-star Rita Daniela filed an acts of lasciviousness complaint against Alemania with the Bacoor City Prosecutor's Office. According to the affidavit submitted by Daniela, the alleged incident occurred after a house party organized by the show's lead star Bea Alonzo for the cast and crew in Quezon City. Daniela claimed that Alemania touched her inappropriately, forcibly kissed her several times, and refused to release her from his grasp. After the case was filed, Alemania was swiftly terminated from the show. In March 2025, a court in Bacoor issued an arrest warrant against Alemania over the charges. On October 24, 2025, Alemania was convicted and sentenced to a year of imprisonment.

== Filmography ==
=== Television ===
Year	Title	Role	Notes	Source
2003–2005	Ang Tanging Ina	Richard		
2004–2005	MTB Ang Saya Saya	Himself – Host		
2004–2007	Wazzup Wazzup	Himself	Segment: "Reklamador"; Tadjock (2004–2005); News anchor (2005–2007)	
2005	Stardance	Himself – Host		
2006	Digital Tour	Himself – Host		
2006	Komiks Presents: Sandok ni Boninay	Ogee		
2007–08	Lastikman	Chikoy Gipit		
2008	Maalaala Mo Kaya	Severo	Episode: "Singsing"	
2008	Mysmatch	Himself – Host		
2008	Maalaala Mo Kaya	Bong	Episode: "Mesa"	
2008	I Love Betty La Fea	Johnny		
2009	May Bukas Pa	Tipoy		
2009	George and Cecil	Ronnie Palacios		
2010	I Laugh Sabado	Himself		
2010	Imortal	Arturo Lumibao		
2011	Wansapanataym	Bernard	Episode: "A Boy's Bestfriend"	
2011	Maalaala Mo Kaya	Rolly	Episode: "Tulay"	
2011	Ikaw Ay Pag-Ibig	Mr. Daplan		
2011–12	Maria La Del Barrio	Nelson		
2012	Precious Hearts Romances Presents: Hiyas	Karel		
2012	Wansapanataym	Andoy	Episode: "Da Revengers"	
2012	Maalaala Mo Kaya	Jayson	Episode: "Belen"	
2013	Maalaala Mo Kaya	Cesar	Episode: "Double Bass"	
2013	Maria Mercedes	Rex		
2014	Annaliza	Wilson		
2015	Kapamilya, Deal or No Deal	Himself / Briefcase Number 14		
2015	Karelasyon	Diego	Episode: "Gayuma"	
2016	Tubig at Langis	Reybong		
2016	Karelasyon	Kulit	Episode: "Wanted: Tatay"	
2016	Calle Siete	Timo		
2016	Karelasyon	Harvey	Episode: "Bisita"	
2016	FPJ's Ang Probinsyano	Choy		
2017	Road Trip	Himself – Guest		
2017	Full House Tonight	Himself – Co-host		
2017–2023	Bubble Gang	Himself		
2017	D' Originals	Art		
2017	Dear Uge	Mario	Episode: "Mr. + Mrs. + Ex#	
2017	Pepito Manaloto: Ang Tunay Na Kwento	Joey		
2017	Wish Ko Lang	Stephen	Episode: "Sr. Jane"	
2018	Magpakailanman	Allan	Episode: "Mula Asawa, Hanggang Awa"	
2018	Ang Forever Ko'y Ikaw	Maoy		
2018	Inday Will Always Love You	Boss Archie	Guest	
2018	Dear Uge	Ted Antonio	Episode: "I Hate You, I Love You"	
2019	TODA One I Love	Kevin	Recurring Role	
2019	One of the Baes	Efren "Bagets" Reynes	Supporting Role	
2021–2022	Pepito Manaloto: Ang Unang Kuwento	Benny	Supporting Role	
2023	Abot-Kamay na Pangarap	Lando	Guest	
2023	Sparkle U: #Ghosted	Dexter	Supporting Role	
2024	May For Ever	Rudy	Supporting Role	
2024	Widows' War	Marcus Trano (last TV appearance before legal case)	Recurring role	

=== Film ===
Year	Title	Role	Notes	Source
2005	D' Anothers	Jograd		
2006	'Wag Kang Lilingon	Lander	Segment: "Salamin"	
2008	Baby Angelo			
2009	Kimmy Dora: Kambal sa Kiyeme	Kidnapper		
2010	Third World Happy	Lyndon		
2011	Segunda Mano	Ivan's friend		
2013	Bad Romance			
2013	Norte, the End of History	Joaquin		
2015	Heneral Luna	Captain Eduardo Rusca		
2015	Apocalypse Child			
2016	Beyond the Door			
2017	Can't Help Falling in Love	Tito Paul		
2018	Goyo: The Boy General	Captain Eduardo Rusca		
2019	Bato (The General Ronald dela Rosa Story)	Police officer		
2026	HB2ME		(last movie appearance before legal case)	

== Awards and nominations ==
Year	Award-giving body	Category	Work	Result	Ref.
2009	32nd Gawad Urian Awards	Best Supporting Actor (Pinakamahusay Na Pangalawang Aktor)	Baby Angelo	Nominated	
2014	37th Gawad Urian Awards	Best Supporting Actor (Pinakamahusay Na Pangalawang Aktor)	Norte, the End of History	Nominated	
