= Dementia (2014 film) =

- Official Movie Poster
- Directed by: Perci Intalan
- Written by: Jun Lana
- Starring: Nora Aunor; Jasmine Curtis; Bing Loyzaga; Chynna Ortaleza
- Production companies: Octobertrain Films; The IdeaFirst Company
- Distributed by: Regal Entertainment
- Release date: September 24, 2014
- Country: Philippines
- Languages: Tagalog, English
- Box office: ₱5,159,070.00

Dementia is a 2014 Filipino horror film directed by Perci Intalan, in his directorial debut. The film stars Nora Aunor as Mara, a woman faced with dementia encountering strange occurrences in her ancestral home. The film premiered on September 24, 2014, under Regal Films.

The film won Best Foreign Language Film and Aunor the Best Actress in a foreign language film at the 2015 St. Tropez International Film Festival.

== Synopsis ==
In the hopes of helping her aunt Mara (Nora Aunor) better deal with her dementia, Rachel (Jasmine Curtis) moves her out to their family's remote ancestral home. There Rachel records Mara's daily activities and helps engage the older woman in exercises that would help her cognitive thinking, such as putting together jigsaw puzzles. What Rachel did not plan on is that Mara's presence in the house will stir up memories and presences that are better left undisturbed. Mara and Rachel begin to see a ghost of Mara's past memories come alive.

== Cast ==
- Nora Aunor as Mara Fabre, a woman facing dementia
- Bing Loyzaga as Elaine, Mara's younger cousin
- Yul Servo as Rommel, as Elaine's husband.
- Jasmine Curtis as Rachel, Mara's first cousin once removed, and Elaine's and Rommel's daughter
- Jeric Gonzales as Vincent, a young neighbor
- Chynna Ortaleza as Olivia
- Althea Vega as a local healer and shaman
- Lui Manansala as a faithful family retainer

== Production ==
The principal photography for the film started on March 19, 2014, in Batanes. Scenes were primarily shot in Sabtang and some were shot in Basco. Most of the shooting the film were done in the day and seldom goes beyond sunset.

== Awards and recognition ==
=== International ===
Year	Group	Category	Nominee	Result
2015	St. Tropez International Film Festival	Best Foreign Language Film		Won
2015	St. Tropez International Film Festival	Best Lead Actress in a Foreign Language Film	Nora Aunor	Won
2015	St. Tropez International Film Festival	Best Film		Nominated
2015	St. Tropez International Film Festival	Best Director	Perci Intalan	Nominated
2015	St. Tropez International Film Festival	Best Original Screenplay	Renei Dimla	Nominated
2015	Soho International Film Festival NYC	Best Performance	Nora Aunor	Nominated

=== Local ===
Year	Group	Category	Nominee	Result
2015	13th Gawad Tanglaw	Best Actress	Nora Aunor	Won
2015	17th Gawad Pasado	Best Picture		Won
2015	17th Gawad Pasado	Best Actress	Nora Aunor	Won
2015	17th Gawad Pasado	Best Cinematography	Mackie Galvez	Won
2015	17th Gawad Pasado	Best Sound	Von de Guzman	Won
2015	17th Gawad Pasado	Special Award for Best Language Usage		Won
2015	17th Gawad Pasado	Best Director	Perci Intalan	Won
2015	17th Gawad Pasado	Best Supporting Actress	Bing Loyzaga	Nominated
2015	17th Gawad Pasado	Best Supporting Actress	Chynna Ortaleza	Nominated
2015	17th Gawad Pasado	Best Supporting Actress	Jasmine Curtis	Nominated
2015	17th Gawad Pasado	Best Supporting Actor	Yul Servo	Nominated
2015	31st Star Awards for Movies	Best Actress	Nora Aunor	Won
2015	31st Star Awards for Movies	Indie Movie Musical Scorer of the year	Von De Guzman	Won
2015	31st Star Awards for Movies	Indie Movie of the Year		Nominated
2015	31st Star Awards for Movies	Indie Movie Director of the Year	Perci Intalan-Lana	Nominated
2015	31st Star Awards for Movies	Best Supporting Actress	Jasmine Curtis	Nominated
2015	31st Star Awards for Movies	Best New Movie Actor	Jeric Gonzales	Nominated
2015	31st Star Awards for Movies	Indie Movie Screenwriter of the year	Renier Dimla	Nominated
2015	31st Star Awards for Movies	Indie Movie Cinematographer of the year	Mackie Galvez	Nominated
2015	31st Star Awards for Movies	Indie Movie Editor of the year	Lawrence Ang	Nominated
2015	31st Star Awards for Movies	Indie Movie Production Designer of the year	Popo Diaz	Nominated
2015	38th Gawad Urian Awards	Best Production Design	Popo Diaz	Won
2015	38th Gawad Urian Awards	Best Actress	Nora Aunor	Nominated
2015	38th Gawad Urian Awards	Best Cinematography	Mackie Galvez	Nominated

== See also ==
- List of ghost films
