= Death March (film) =

2013 film

- Official movie poster
- Directed by: Adolfo Alix, Jr.
- Written by: Rody Vera
- Produced by: Jacky Woo
- Starring: Sam Milby; Zanjoe Marudo; Jason Abalos; Sid Lucero; Felix Roco; Carlo Aquino; Luis Alandy; Benjamin Alves
- Cinematography: Albert Banzon
- Edited by: Benjamin Gonzales Tolentino
- Music by: 4 + 1
- Production companies: Forward Entertainment; Phoenix Features
- Distributed by: Équation Distribution
- Release date: May 19, 2013 (Cannes)
- Running time: 105 minutes
- Country: Philippines
- Language: Filipino

Death March (Filipino: Martsang kamatayan) is a 2013 Philippine war drama directed by Adolfo Alix, Jr. It was screened in the Un Certain Regard section at the 2013 Cannes Film Festival. The story depicts the infamous World War II Bataan Death March.

== Synopsis ==
Set in 1942 Philippines, the story follows the Bataan Death March during the World War II, where the Japanese Imperial Forces have taken captives thousands of Filipinos and Americans soldiers and service members who are prisoners of war and force them to march in extreme conditions from Bataan to Tarlac via San Fernando route.

== Cast ==
- Jason Abalos as Carlito
- Sid Lucero as Miguel
- Zanjoe Marudo as Alex
- Sam Milby as Roy Cook
- Felix Roco as Fidel
- Carlo Aquino as Claudio
- Jacky Woo as Hatori
- Luis Alandy
- Benjamin Alves

== Production ==
The film was shot in black and white, and used hand-painted backdrops. Film director Adolfo Alix, Jr. initially decided to film on location, but decided to shoot with artificial sets after consulting with the production designer to "heighten the surreal feeling of the film". Fifteen artists hand-painted the backdrops for around two months, and the film exceeded its budget.

When asked on his motivations to create to film, the director mentioned that he found grandfather's anecdotes on the Second World War interesting, and that he considered Death March a suitable conclusion to a trilogy of his previous films Liberation and Kalayaan.

== Reception ==
The film intended to provide viewers a "surreal, barbaic experience" through slow-motion and black and white cinematography, for Variety's Justin Chang. However, the film did not gain its intended effects for several "over-literal touches" in its writing. The Hollywood Reporter's Todd McCarthy commends the film's cinematography and soundtrack to achieve a sense of "hallucinatory claustrophobia", but noted repetitiveness is its elements that compromises its impact. The film's characters lacked personal stories, which would have drawn viewers attention for McCarthy.
