= Gawad Urian Award =

Annual film awards in the Philippines

Gawad Urian Awards
- Current: 48th Gawad Urian Awards
- Awarded for: Outstanding achievements in Filipino cinema
- Country: Philippines
- Presented by: Manunuri ng Pelikulang Pilipino
- First award: 1977

The Gawad Urian Awards are annual film awards in the Philippines presented since 1977 by the Manunuri ng Pelikulang Pilipino (transl. Filipino Film Critics), an organization composed of film critic, writers, and scholars. It is the regarded as the highest award for a film given by critics in the Philippines and is seen as the counterpart of the United States' New York Film Critics Circle.

The name "Gawad Urian" is from Tagalog terms urian (a standard for gold) and gawad (award). It is the only major award-giving body in the Philippines to use the vernacular in awards shows and in the presentation of the awards. The official name for the Best Film category is Pinakamahusay na Pelikula, for example.

== History ==
Filipino Film Critics
- Manunuri ng Pelikulang Pilipino
- Abbreviation: MPP
- Nickname: Manunuri
- Formation: 1976
- Type: Film criticism
- Location: Philippines
- Official language: Filipino
- President: Rolando Tolentino
- Website: manunuripelikula.com

The Manunuri ng Pelikulang Pilipino was formed by a host of scholars, film writers and other award-winning writers on May 1, 1976, as a critics' voice to rival the then-only award-giving body in the Philippines, which is its Oscars, the FAMAS Awards. Three years earlier, what would be the members of the Manunuri were included in the judges' roster of the FAMAS after a shocking 1972 Best Actress tie materialized between major star Boots Anson-Roa and then-rising star Vilma Santos. A tie was unheard of at that time, which resulted in accusations of lessening prestige on the part of FAMAS. After a voting stint at the FAMAS, these future Manunuri members set up the Gawad Urian Awards.

The Gawad Urian Awards were established to "examine Filipino films, bolster the interest of the masses and the Philippine film industry, study and celebrate the achievement that will help define the good Filipino film, and cultivate the knowledge and skills that the film medium was designed for, which is to be a medium of communication and expression of our culture according to the standards and conditions of filmmaking in our country."

It then went on to become one of the most prestigious film award-giving bodies in the Philippines. Unlike the other award-giving bodies in the country, it has never been tainted with any accusations of vote buying or scandals. This distinction made the Gawad Urian a highly coveted award in the Philippine film industry that is only given to the most deserved winners.

The Gawad Urian is known for its infamous ties. At a time when the Filipino award-giving bodies were adamant about awarding ties after the FAMAS rock-up in 1972, the Gawad Urian has given ties in the Best Film category (3 ties), Best Screenplay category (1), Best Actress category (6) and Best Supporting Actress category (2), a dozen ties all in all. It is also known for awarding several lesser-known films produced by small independent production companies. In 2004, Ebolusyon ng Isang Pamilyang Pilipino, a landmark Filipino drama, was awarded Pinakamahusay na Pelikula (Best Film) by Gawad Urian, while it did not receive a single nomination from any award-giving body that year.

In 1988, the awards for the films of 1987 were not held because the Manunuri deemed that there was a "lack of deserving winners," which was a first in Filipino awards history.

In 2006, the Gawad Urian became the first award-giving body in the Philippine to welcome digital films into competition. Its nominees were swamped with achievement from digital films that year, which prompted the other award-giving bodies to include digital films in its roster of nominations the next year.

In 2024, Iti Mapukpukaw became the first animated film in Philippine history to win Best Film at the Gawad Urian.

== Awards ceremonies ==
Ceremony	Date	Best Film	Lifetime Achievement Award
1st	1977	Ganito Kami Noon... Paano Kayo Ngayon?	Manuel de Leon (producer)
2nd	1978	Hubad Na Bayani	Gerardo de Leon (director)
3rd	1979	Pagputi ng Uwak, Pag-itim ng Tagak	Manuel Conde (director, producer)
4th	1980	Jaguar	Manuel Silos (director)
5th	1981	Manila by Night	Lamberto Avellana (director)
6th	1982	Salome	Anita Linda (actress)
7th	1983	Oro, Plata, Mata	Luis Nolasco (director, writer)
8th	1984	Broken Marriage	Mike Accion (cinematographer)
9th	1985	Sister Stella L.	William Smith (sound engineer)
10th	June 4, 1986	Bayan Ko: Kapit sa Patalim	Tito Arévalo (actor)
11th	1987	Takaw Tukso	Rosa Rosal (actress)
12th	May 26, 1989	Itanong Mo sa Buwan	Not awarded
13th	1990	Pahiram ng Isang Umaga	Richard Aberlardo (director)
14th	1991	Gumapang Ka sa Lusak	Susana C. de Guzman
15th	1992	Ipagpatawad Mo	Mary Walter (actress)
16th	1993	Ikaw Pa Lang ang Minahal	Levi Celerio (film score composer)
17th	1994	Makati Ave. Office Girls	Leopoldo Salcedo (actor)
18th	April 29, 1995	The Fatima Buen Story	Eddie Romero (director)
19th	May 11, 1996	Sana Maulit Muli	Pancho Magalona (actor)
20th	May 10, 1997	Segurista	Felipe Sacdalan (cinematographer)
21st	March 28, 1998	Milagros	Dolphy (actor)
22nd	March 28, 1999	Bata, Bata, Paano Ka Ginawa?	Mona Lisa (actress)
23rd	March 11, 2000	Bayaning Third World	Nida Blanca (actress)
24th	March 24, 2001	Tuhog	Manahan sisters (makeup artists)
25th	May 11, 2002	Batang West Side	Fernando Poe, Jr. (actor)
26th	May 17, 2003	Dekada '70	Ricardo Lee (screenwriter)
27th	June 19, 2004	Babae sa Breakwater	Gloria Romero (actress)
28th	June 4, 2005	Ebolusyon ng Isang Pamilyang Pilipino	Jess Navarro (editor)
29th	August 3, 2006	Ang Pagdadalaga ni Maximo Oliveros	Eddie Garcia (actor, director)
30th	September 13, 2007	Kubrador	Marichu Vera Perez-Maceda (producer)
31st	October 1, 2008	Tirador	Kidlat Tahimik (director)
32nd	September 19, 2009	Serbis	Peque Gallaga (director)
33rd	April 29, 2010	Kinatay	Armida Siguion-Reyna (actress, producer)
34th	May 17, 2011	Ang Damgo ni Eleuteria	Jose Lacaba (screenwriter)
35th	June 13, 2012	Ang Sayaw ng Dalawang Kaliwang Paa	Rody Lacap (cinematographer)
36th	June 18, 2013	Ang Paglalakbay ng mga Bituin sa Gabing Madilim	Mila del Sol (actress)
37th	June 17, 2014	Norte, Hangganan ng Kasaysayan	Mike de Leon (director)
38th	June 16, 2015	Mula sa Kung Ano ang Noon	Nora Aunor (actress)
39th	June 22, 2016	Taklub	Romy Vitug (cinematographer)
40th	July 20, 2017	Women of the Weeping River	Vilma Santos (actress)
41st	June 14, 2018	Balangiga: Howling Wilderness	Winston Raval (film score composer)
42nd	June 18, 2019	BuyBust	Gloria Sevilla (actress)
43rd	November 10, 2020	Babae at Baril	Fiel Corrales Zabat (production designer)
44th	October 21, 2021	Aswang	Lav Diaz (director)
45th	October 27, 2022	On the Job: The Missing 8 and Big Night! (tie)	Roxlee (animator)
46th	November 30, 2023	Kapag Wala Nang Mga Alon	Jaime Fábregas (actor, film score composer)
47th	June 8, 2024	Iti Mapukpukaw	Hilda Koronel (actress)
48th	October 11, 2025	Alipato at Muog	Dante Rivero (actor)

== Award categories ==
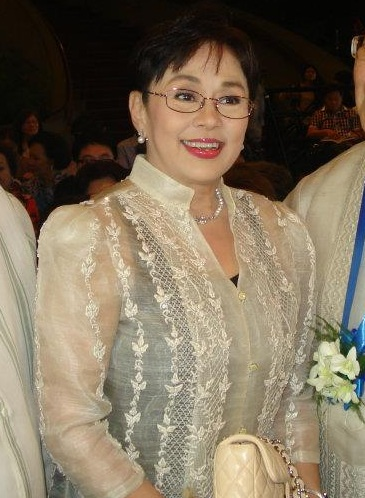
Vilma Santos is Gawad Urian's most decorated thespian. She won awards in the categories of Best Actress (1982, 1983, 1984), Actress of the Decade (1980s), Best Film (1979) as a producer as well as a Lifetime Achievement Award.

=== Current categories ===
- Pinakamahusay na Pelikula (Best Film)
- Pinakamahusay na Direksyon (Best Direction)
- Pinakamahusay na Pangunahing Aktor (Best Actor)
- Pinakamahusay na Pangunahing Aktres (Best Actress)
- Pinakamahusay na Pangalawang Aktor (Best Supporting Actor)
- Pinakamahusay na Pangalawang Aktres (Best Supporting Actress)
- Pinakamahusay na Dulang Pampelikula (Best Screenplay)
- Pinakamahusay na Sinematograpiya (Best Cinematography)
- Pinakamahusay na Disenyong Pamproduksyon (Best Production Design)
- Pinakamahusay na Editing (Best Editing)
- Pinakamahusay na Musika (Best Music)
- Pinakamahusay na Tunog (Best Sound)
- Pinakamahusay na Maikling Pelikula (Best Short Film)
- Pinakamahusay na Dokyumentaryo (Best Documentary)

=== Honorary awards ===
- Natatanging Gawad Urian (Lifetime Achievement Award) – for film artisans whose contributions have helped shape the Filipino film industry.
- Ginintuang Gawad Urian (Golden Urian Award) – given by the Manunuri to Mike de Leon in 1992, the first and the last time the award was given out.

== Decades lists ==
=== Best Films of the Decade ===
Every end of a decade, the Manunuri publishes a list called Mga Natatanging Pelukula ng Dekada which recognizes the best films of the decade.

==== 1970s ====
- Pagdating sa Dulo (1971) dir. Ishmael Bernal
- Tinimbang Ka Ngunit Kulang (1974) dir. Lino Brocka
- Manila in the Claws of Light (1975) dir. Lino Brocka
- Ganito Kami Noon... Paano Kayo Ngayon? (1976) dir. Eddie Romero
- Insiang (1976) dir. Lino Brocka
- Itim (1976) dir. Mike de Leon
- Nunal sa Tubig (1976) dir. Ishmael Bernal
- Sakada (1976) dir. Behn Cervantes
- Pagputi ng Uwak, Pag-itim ng Tagak (1978) dir. Celso Ad. Castillo
- Jaguar (1979) dir. Lino Brocka

==== 1980s ====
- Manila by Night (1980) dir. Ishmael Bernal
- Kisapmata (1981) dir. Mike de Leon
- Batch '81 (1982) dir. Mike de Leon
- Himala (1982) dir. Ishmael Bernal
- Oro, Plata, Mata (1982) dir. Peque Gallaga
- Karnal (1983) dir. Marilou Diaz-Abaya
- Bayan Ko: Kapit sa Patalim (1984) dir. Lino Brocka
- Sister Stella L. (1984) dir. Mike de Leon
- Hinugot sa Langit (1985) dir. Ishmael Bernal
- Orapronobis (1989) dir. Lino Brocka

==== 1990s ====
- Gumapang Ka sa Lusak (1990) dir. Lino Brocka
- The Fatima Buen Story (1994) dir. Mario O'Hara
- Wating (1994) dir. Ishmael Bernal
- The Flor Contemplacion Story (1995) dir. Joel Lamangan
- Milagros (1997) dir. Marilou Diaz-Abaya
- Bata, Bata... Pa'no Ka Ginawa? (1998) dir. Chito Roño
- José Rizal (1998) dir. Marilou Diaz-Abaya
- Bayaning 3rd World (1999) dir. Mike de Leon
- Pila-balde (1999) dir. Jeffrey Jeturian

==== 2000s ====
- Batang West Side (2001) dir. Lav Diaz
- Tuhog (2001) dir. Jeffrey Jeturian
- Babae sa Breakwater (2003) dir. Mario O'Hara
- Magnifico (2003) dir. Maryo J. de los Reyes
- Ebolusyon ng Isang Pamilyang Pilipino (2004) dir. Lav Diaz
- Ang Pagdadalaga ni Maximo Oliveros (2005) dir. Auraeus Solito
- Kubrador (2006) dir. Jeffrey Jeturian
- Serbis (2008) dir. Brillante Mendoza
- Kinatay (2009) dir. Brillante Mendoza
- Lola (2009) dir. Brillante Mendoza

==== 2010s ====
- Ang Damgo ni Eleuteria (2010) dir. Remton Siega Zuasola
- Ang Sayaw ng Dalawang Kaliwang Paa (2011) dir. Alvin Yapan
- Ang Paglalakbay ng mga Bituin sa Gabing Madilim (2012) dir. Arnel Mardoquio
- Norte, Hangganan ng Kasaysayan (2013) dir. Lav Diaz
- Women of the Weeping River (2016) dir. Sheron Dayoc
- Baboy Halas (2016) dir. Bagane Fiola
- Tu Pug Imatuy (2017) dir. Arnel Barbarona
- Respeto (2017) dir. Treb Monteras
- Balangiga: Howling Wilderness (2017) dir. Khavn de la Cruz
- BuyBust (2018) dir. Erik Matti
- Babae at Baril (2019) dir. Rae Red

==== 1970 – 1999 ====
- Maynila: Sa mga Kuko ng Liwanag (1975) dir. Lino Brocka
- Ganito Kami Noon, Paano Kayo Ngayon (1976) dir. Eddie Romero
- Insiang (1976) dir. Lino Brocka
- Nunal sa Tubig (1976) dir. Ishmael Bernal
- City After Dark (1980) dir. Ishmael Bernal
- Kisapmata (1981) dir. Mike de Leon
- Batch '81 (1982) dir. Mike de Leon
- Himala (1982) dir. Ishmael Bernal
- Orapronobis (1989) dir. Lino Brocka
- Bayaning 3rd World (1999) dir. Mike de Leon

=== Best Actors and Actresses of the Decade ===
The Mga Natatanging Aktor at Aktres ng Dekada awards are given every first year of the decade to actors and actresses who had made outstanding works in the past decade. The artists named on these lists are also honored during that year's awards ceremony. Nora Aunor is the only performer, male or female, to receive the award in three different decades.

- 1980s: Gina Alajar, Nora Aunor, Phillip Salvador, Vic Silayan, Vilma Santos
- 1990s: Nora Aunor, Richard Gomez, Vilma Santos
- 2000s: Coco Martin, Gina Pareño, Cherry Pie Picache
- 2010s: Nora Aunor, Angeli Bayani, John Lloyd Cruz, Alessandra de Rossi
