= 38th Gawad Urian Awards =

2015 Philippine film awards ceremony

- Official poster featuring Nora Aunor in various roles.
- Date: June 16, 2015
- Site: ABS-CBN Studio 10, South Triangle, Quezon City
- Hosted by: Robi Domingo; Butch Francisco; Angelica Panganiban

Highlights
- Best Film: Mula sa Kung Ano ang Noon
- Most awards: Mula sa Kung Ano ang Noon (4)
- Most nominations: Barber's Tales; Dagitab (11)

Television coverage
- Network: Cinema One

The 38th Gawad Urian Awards or Ika-38 na Gawad Urian was held on June 16, 2015, at Studio 10 of ABS-CBN. They honored the best Filipino films for the year 2014. It was also aired live at Cinema One channel.

Nominations were announced on May 20. Barber's Tales and Dagitab received the most nominations with eleven.

Mula sa Kung Ano ang Noon won most of the awards with four, including Best Film. The Natatanging Gawad Urian was given to Nora Aunor. The ceremony paid tributes to the late directors Lamberto Avellana and Manuel Conde for their 100th birth anniversaries.

== Winners and nominees ==
Best Film Pinakamahusay na Pelikula	Best Direction Pinakamahusay na Direksyon
Mula sa Kung Ano ang Noon; Barber's Tales; Bwaya; Dagitab	Lav Diaz – Mula sa Kung Ano ang Noon; Giancarlo Abrahan – Dagitab; Kanakan Balintagos – Esprit de Corps; Jun Lana – Barber's Tales; Jason Paul Laxamana – Magkakabaung; Francis Xavier Pasion – Bwaya
Best Actor Pinakamahusay na Pangunahing Aktor	Best Actress Pinakamahusay na Pangunahing Aktres
Allen Dizon – Magkakabaung; Robert Arevalo – Hari ng Tondo; Noni Buencamino – Dagitab; JM de Guzman – That Thing Called Tadhana; Sandino Martin – Esprit de Corps; Robin Padilla – Bonifacio: Ang Unang Pangulo; Arnold Reyes – Kasal; Jericho Rosales – Red; J.C. Santos – Esprit de Corps; Dennis Trillo – The Janitor	Eula Valdez – Dagitab; Nora Aunor – Dementia; Angeli Bayani – Bwaya; Ai-Ai delas Alas – Ronda; Eugene Domingo – Barber's Tales; Hazel Orencio – Mula sa Kung Ano ang Noon; Angelica Panganiban – That Thing Called Tadhana; Nova Villa – 1st Ko Si 3rd
Best Supporting Actor Pinakamahusay na Pangalawang Aktor	Best Supporting Actress Pinakamahusay na Pangalawang Aktres
Martin del Rosario – Dagitab; Nico Antonio – Red; Roeder Camañag – Mula sa Kung Ano ang Noon; Joel Lamangan – Violator; Nicco Manalo – Barber's Tales; Karl Medina – Bwaya; Jess Mendoza – Mauban: Ang Resiko; Noel Sto. Domingo – Mula sa Kung Ano ang Noon	Gladys Reyes – Magkakabaung; Shamaine Buencamino – Barber's Tales; Iza Calzado – Barber's Tales; Alessandra de Rossi – Mauban: Ang Resiko; Barbie Forteza – Mariquina; Karenina Haniel – Mula sa Kung Ano ang Noon; Gloria Sevilla – M. (Mother's Maiden Name)
Best Screenplay Pinakamahusay na Dulang Pampelikula	Best Cinematography Pinakamahusay na Sinematograpiya
Lav Diaz – Mula sa Kung Ano ang Noon; Giancarlo Abrahan – Dagitab; Kanakan Balintagos – Esprit de Corps; Antoinette Jadaone – That Thing Called Tadhana; Jun Lana – Barber's Tales; Jason Paul Laxamana – Magkakabaung; Francis Xavier Pasion – Bwaya; Enzo Williams, Keiko Aquino & Carlo Obispo – Bonifacio: Ang Unang Pangulo; Remton Siega Zuasola – Soap Opera	Neil Daza – Bwaya; Albert Banzon & Gym Lumbera – Violator; Arnel Barbarona – Alienasyon; Mycko David – Children’s Show; Mackie Galvez – Dementia; Carlo Mendoza – Barber's Tales; Carlo Mendoza – Bonifacio: Ang Unang Pangulo; Sasha Palomares – That Thing Called Tadhana; Rommel Sales – Dagitab
Best Production Design Pinakamahusay na Disenyong Pamproduksyon	Best Editing Pinakamahusay na Editing
Popo Diaz – Dementia; Whammy Alcazaren & Thesa Tang – Dagitab; Hal Balbuena – Esprit de Corps; Joel Bilbao & Roy Lachica – Bonifacio: Ang Unang Pangulo; Perry Dizon – Mula sa Kung Ano ang Noon; Ron Factolerin – Alienasyon; Maulen Fadul – Bwaya; Chito Sumera – Barber's Tales	Lav Diaz – Mula sa Kung Ano ang Noon; Lawrence Ang – Barber's Tales; Lawrence Ang – Violator; Manet Dayrit – Hari ng Tondo; Vanessa De Leon – Hustisya; Tara Illenberger – The Janitor; Carlo Manatad – Bwaya; Benjamin Tolentino – Bonifacio: Ang Unang Pangulo; Benjamin Tolentino – Dagitab
Best Music Pinakamahusay na Musika	Best Sound Pinakamahusay na Tunog
Erwin Fajardo – Bwaya; Diwa de Leon – Lorna; Mon Espia – Dagitab; Jesse Lucas – Alienasyon; Myke Salomon – Hari ng Tondo; Jorge Wieneke – #Y	Corinne de San Jose – Violator; Albert Michael Idioma – Bwaya; Mark Locsin – Barber's Tales; Mark Locsin – Mula sa Kung Ano ang Noon; Adam Newns & Mikko Quizon – Dagitab
Best Short Film Pinakamahusay na Maikling Pelikula	Best Documentary Pinakamahusay na Dokyumentaryo
Adolfo Alix, Jr. – Kinabukasan; Kevin Ang – Lola; Joe Bacus – The End of War; David Corpuz – The Ordinary Things We Do; Neica dela Cruz – Lunod; Thop Nazareno – Eyeball; Alyssa Mariel Suico – Ugkat; Petersen Vargas – Lisyun qng Geografia	Lester Valle – Walang Rape sa Bontok; Lav Diaz – Storm Children, Book One (Mga Anak ng Unos); J. Luis Burgos – Portraits of Mosquito Press; Cha Escala & Wena Sanchez – Nick & Chai; Rafael Froilan, Jr. – Mananayaw; Richard Legaspi – Ang Walang Kapagurang Paglalakbay ng Pulang Maleta; Jan Tristan Pandy – Gusto Nang Umuwi ni Joy; Paolo Villaluna – Sta. Catalina; Baby Ruth Villarama – Little Azkals
Lifetime Achievement Award Natatanging Gawad Urian	
Nora Aunor	

== Multiple nominations and awards ==
Nominations	Film
11	Barber's Tales
11	Dagitab
10	Bwaya
10	Mula sa Kung Ano ang Noon
5	Bonifacio: Ang Unang Pangulo
5	Esprit de Corps
4	Magkakabaung
4	That Thing Called Tadhana
4	Violator
3	Alienasyon
3	Hari ng Tondo
3	Dementia
2	Mauban: Ang Unang Resiko
2	Red
2	The Janitor

Awards	Film
4	Mula sa Kung Ano ang Noon
2	Bwaya
2	Dagitab
2	Magkakabaung
