= Melancholia (2008 film) =

- Official movie poster
- Directed by: Lav Diaz
- Written by: Lav Diaz
- Produced by: Lav Diaz
- Starring: Angeli Bayani; Perry Dizon
- Cinematography: Lav Diaz
- Edited by: Lav Diaz
- Music by: Lav Diaz; The Brockas
- Release date: 29 September 2008 (Venice)
- Running time: 447 minutes
- Country: Philippines
- Language: Filipino

Melancholia is a 2008 Philippine film shot, edited, co-composed, written, produced, and directed by Lav Diaz. It won the Horizons prize (Best Picture, Orizzonti) at the 65th Venice International Film Festival.

== Plot ==
The film is divided into three parts, plus an epilogue, but these parts are not explicitly defined within the movie.

=== Part 1 ===
The film begins with a young woman getting dressed in a prostitute's clothing and walking up a long road from her apartment. She crosses paths with a nun asking for alms and gives her some money. The nun continues on her journey and runs across a pimp who confronts the nun's charity work as "useless". The prostitute befriends a woman working a small convenience shack. On her way home, the prostitute comes across the pimp, who tries to lure her to work for him. She refuses, saying that she can't take care of herself. The prostitute has dinner at a small cafe, where a large man seems to recognize her and continually pesters her by referring to her as "Alberta". After leaving the restaurant, the prostitute attempts to please an American client, but starts crying and has to end the sex session before it begins, leaving the American man angry and bewildered. The next day, the nun continues to ask for money, and the prostitute once again meets the pimp, who tries to bring her into his business. Later in the day, the pimp sets up a "live sex show" for some Japanese customers. The prostitute comes across the large man who keeps referring to her as "Alberta". He decides to ask for her services and pays her money. However, once they get to the apartment, the large man only asks the prostitute to take off her clothes and turn around several times. He examines her body and finally decides that she is not "Alberta". He then tells her the story of his childhood friend Renato Munoz, who ended up falling for a rich girl named Alberta, and they both joined the Communist rebellion movement in the Philippines. He resents Alberta for taking his friend away from him. He says Alberta was obsessed with finding Renato after he became a Communist guerrilla fighter in the forest. That night, the nun undresses in her room, looking depressed. She exits her room and enters the prostitute's room right next door, and tells her that she's getting fed up with the therapy. We now realize that the prostitute, whose real name is Alberta Munoz, and the nun, who is really Rina Abad, are patients of a man named Julian Tomas, who is having them undergo a role-playing therapy called MELANCHOLIA to help them mentally recover from the past tragedies and losses in their lives. Rina is starting to spiral into a depression and Alberta becomes concerned. The next day, she tries frantically to call Julian (the pimp) to tell him that they need to call the therapy session off. He screams at her that he is "not Julian" and refuses to break character. He instead invites Alberta and Rina to a live sex show he has planned for them. Throughout the duration of the sex show, Alberta and Rina are visibly disturbed by Julian's immersion into his character. The next day, Rina goes missing.

=== Part 2 ===
Julian engages in a bizarre therapy performance where he paces around a room smoking a cigarette while a patient continually rips pages out of a Bible and chews them until she starts to gag. Julian is at home reviewing texts and a manuscript for a book his friend has given him to publish. He invites the friend over and says he won't publish the manuscript until he gives the money he owes. The friend promises and goes on a lengthy description of what the book is about. Julian and Alberta meet for coffee, and Alberta scolds Julian for his complete neglect of Rina's health. Julian admits he was wrong but refuses to admit his Melancholia therapy is an abject failure. Alberta goes to rescue Rina's abandoned daughter, Hannah, from prostitution and brings her back home. Alberta visits her mother, who gives her dinner. Alberta then takes Hannah to the beach to have some fun and explains the friendship that her mother and Alberta shared as kids through their high school and college days. Rina is discovered to be dead, and her funeral is proclaimed. Julian attends, and Rina's mother yells at him for being responsible for her daughter's death. Julian spirals into a depression, having serious thoughts about drowning himself. Alberta discovers Julian's book Melancholia in the bookstore and breaks down crying after reading a few pages of it.

=== Part 3 ===
Renato and the Communist rebels trek through the forest trying to avoid Philippine soldiers. The further they go into the forest, the more their situation starts to eat at their sanity. Renato stays sober by writing letters to the love of his life Alberta. One of the soldiers finally loses all hope and screams in the open field near the stream for the Philippine soldiers to shoot him and take him out of his misery. Renato and the other soldier plead him to quiet down. The Philippine forces shoot and kill two of the soldiers, leaving Renato the only one left alive. He writes another letter to Alberta, saying that their sorrow will never end and is inescapable. It is assumed Renato commits suicide after this. The film cuts to a pair of indigenous tribal men carrying Renato's dead body along with the other soldiers, to their village and performing a ritual of dance and chanting.

=== Epilogue ===
Julian sits solemnly by the river. Alberta meets one of the live sex show performers from earlier in the film, who has completely immersed his mind and soul into Julian's therapy. Alberta tells him that Julian is a fraud, but the performer is convinced Julian is God. He says that Julian's therapy of role-play treats the world as a stage and every individual as an actor and that since he is a performer, he is only a tool of the world Julian has created, thus making he himself Julian's creation. Alberta meets Julian once again and tells him that he is not God and that his therapy is a failure and he has to get over the death of his wife. Julian only repeats the phrase "I am not Julian" over and over again.

== Cast ==
- Angeli Bayani as Alberta Munoz / Jenine
- Perry Dizon as Julian Tomas / pimp
- Roeder as Renato Munoz
- Dante Perez as rebel
- Raul Arellano as rebel
- Malaya as Rina Abad / nun
- Irma Adlawan as Spiritist / store owner
- Cookie Chua as Patricia / kundiman singer
- Yanyan Taa as Hannah

== Reception ==
Ronnie Scheib of Variety called the film "Lav Diaz's latest madly uncommercial 7½ -hour magnum opus", and particularly complimented the "extraordinary final chapter". Scheib summarised: "Simultaneously lamenting the futility of change yet celebrating reinvention, the improbable Melancholia lingers on the brain."

== See also ==
- List of longest films
