= Service (film) =

- Official movie poster
- Serbis
- Directed by: Brillante Mendoza
- Screenplay by: Armando Lao
- Story by: Armando Lao; Boots Agbayani Pastor
- Produced by: Ferdinand Lapuz
- Starring: Coco Martin; Gina Pareño; Jaclyn Jose; Julio Diaz; Kristoffer King; Mercedes Cabral
- Cinematography: Odyssey Flores
- Edited by: Claire Villa-Real
- Music by: Gian Gianan
- Production companies: Centerstage Productions; Swift Productions
- Distributed by: Fortissimo Films; Regent Releasing (United States); GMA Films (Philippines)
- Release dates: 18 May 2008 (Cannes); 25 June 2008 (Philippines)
- Running time: 90 minutes
- Country: Philippines; France
- Language: Filipino
- Box office: $155,156.00

Service (Filipino: Serbis) is a 2008 Filipino independent drama film directed by Brillante Mendoza and stars Gina Pareño as the matriarch of the Pineda family who owns a porn cinema in Angeles City. The film competed for the Palme d'Or in the main competition at the 2008 Cannes Film Festival. It is also the first Filipino film to compete at the main competition in Cannes, since Lino Brocka's Bayan Ko: Kapit sa Patalim in 1984.

== Cast ==
- Gina Pareño as Nanay Flor
- Jaclyn Jose as Nayda
- Julio Diaz as Lando
- Kristoffer King as Ronald
- Mercedes Cabral as Merly
- Coco Martin as Alan
- Dan Alvaro as Jerome

== Production ==
The film was shot in just 12 days.

Brillante Mendoza recounted how difficult it was to find the actress for the role of Merly, partly because of the scene in which she had to have explicit sex on camera: "I couldn't think of a young actress from mainstream movies who can do what the role required, so I held an audition for the role of Merly. I wanted someone who's not interested in becoming a "movie star," I wanted a real artist who can give justice to the role, and I saw that in Mercedes Cabral. The first thing I asked is if she would trust me to shoot this somewhat graphic love scene with Coco. She said it wasn't a problem."

Brillante Mendoza said the scene in which Jewel (played by teenage actress Roxanne Jordan), is naked in front of a mirror, was not in the script.

Service caused a stir in the Philippines with its loud ambient noise and its graphic depiction of sex and nudity. Submitted to the Movie and Television Review and Classification Board for public exhibition in 2008, the movie survived with two major cuts to sex scenes and was rated an R18.

== Release ==
Such was the advance international buzz of the film that it was invited to compete at the 61st Annual Cannes Film Festival, being the 3rd overall entry from the Philippines (following the films of director Lino Brocka, Jaguar and Bayan Ko: Kapit sa Patalim). Its premiere at the festival was marked by the walking out of several veteran film critics who protested Mendoza's version of "misery porn."

On 30 January 2009, the film premiered in New York.

== Reception ==
=== Critical response ===
The film garnered mixed-to-positive reviews. On the review aggregator website Rotten Tomatoes, 79% of 29 critics' reviews are positive. The website's consensus reads: "This darkly comic family drama finds ways of being viscerally graphic and intellectually stimulating at the same time." Metacritic, which uses a weighted average, assigned the film a score of 76 out of 100, based on 11 critics, indicating "generally favorable" reviews.

Writing for The New York Times, its chief film critic Manohla Dargis described the film: "The heavenly bodies that populate our films bring their own pleasures ... alighting onscreen as if from a dream. But the bodies in [‘Serbis’], which received little love at the 2008 Cannes, are not heaven-sent, but neither are they puppets in a contrived nightmare. Rather, they lust, sweat, desire and struggle with the ferocious truth." Roger Ebert of the Chicago Sun-Times gave Service two and a half out of four stars, stating that "[i]f you see only one art film this month, this shouldn't be the one. If you see one every week, you might admire it."

== Accolades ==
Year	Event	Category	Recipient	Result
2008	Cannes Film Festival	Palme d'Or	Serbis	Nominated
2009	Asian Film Awards	Best Director	Brillante Mendoza	Nominated
2009	Asian Film Awards	Best Supporting Actress	Gina Pareño	Won
2009	Asian Film Awards	Best Supporting Actress	Jaclyn Jose	Nominated
2009	Gawad Urian Awards	Best Picture	Serbis	Won
2009	Gawad Urian Awards	Best Director	Brillante Mendoza	Won
2009	Gawad Urian Awards	Best Actress	Gina Pareño	Nominated
2009	Gawad Urian Awards	Best Actress	Jaclyn Jose	Nominated
2009	Gawad Urian Awards	Best Supporting Actor	Julio Diaz	Nominated
2009	Gawad Urian Awards	Best Screenplay	Armando Lao; Boots Agbayani Pastor	Nominated
2009	Gawad Urian Awards	Best Cinematography	Odyssey Flores	Won
2009	Gawad Urian Awards	Best Editing	Claire Villa-Real	Nominated
2009	Gawad Urian Awards	Best Production Design	Benjamin Padero; Carlo Tabije	Won
2009	Gawad Urian Awards	Best Sound	Emmanuel Clemente	Nominated
2011	Gawad Urian Awards	Best Film of the Decade (2000-2009)	Serbis	Won
