= Finding Agnes =

2020 film

- Film poster
- Directed by: Marla Ancheta
- Starring: Jelson Bay; Sue Ramirez; Sandy Andolong
- Production company: Mavx Productions
- Distributed by: Netflix
- Release date: 30 November 2020
- Running time: 105 minutes
- Country: Philippines
- Languages: Filipino; English

Finding Agnes is a 2020 Filipino drama film directed by Marla Ancheta and starring Jelson Bay, Sue Ramirez and Sandy Andolong. The film revolves around a successful businessman who flies to Morocco after the death of his estranged mother to fulfill his mother's final wishes along with her adopted daughter.

== Cast ==
- Jelson Bay as Virgilio "Brix" Rivero
- Sue Ramirez as Cathy Duvera
- Sandy Andolong as Agnes Rivero
- Roxanne Guinoo as Young Agnes Rivero
- Hannah Ledesma as Violet
- Yuan Francisco as Young Virgilio "Brix" Rivero
- Cheska Iñigo

== Production ==
Finding Agnes was directed by Marla Ancheta and written by Aileen Kessop and was produced under Mavx Productions. Filming for Finding Agnes mostly took place in Marrakesh, Morocco in 2019, prior to the COVID-19 pandemic prevailing at the time of the film's release. Initially the script called for a romantic comedy story but Ancheta had the script revised to a "personal journey" story of a person with some light drama elements.

== Release ==
Finding Agnes premiered globally on November 30, 2020 through Netflix
