= From What Is Before =

2014 drama film by Lav Diaz

- Theatrical poster
- Directed by: Lav Diaz
- Written by: Lav Diaz
- Produced by: Lav Diaz; Krzysztof Dabrowski
- Starring: Perry Dizon; Roeder Camanag; Hazel Orencio; Karenina Haniel; Mailes Kanapi
- Cinematography: Lav Diaz
- Edited by: Lav Diaz
- Production company: Sine Olivia Pilipinas
- Release dates: July 3, 2014 (Philippines); August 7, 2014 (Locarno)
- Running time: 338 minutes
- Country: Philippines
- Languages: Filipino; English

From What Is Before (Filipino: Mula sa Kung Ano ang Noon) is a 2014 Filipino drama film written, co-produced, photographed, edited, and directed by Lav Diaz. Set during the Marcos dictatorship, the story follows the villagers who face mysterious events in their peaceful community, only to find out that this would start a violent chapter. The film stars Perry Dizon, Roeder Camanag, Hazel Orencio, Karenina Haniel, and Mailes Kanapi.

Produced by Sine Olivia Pilipinas, the film first premiered in the Philippines on July 3, 2014. It was later screened in international film festivals, including in Locarno International Film Festival in Switzerland on August 7, where it, a competing entry, won the Golden Leopard, Toronto International Film Festival in Canada on September 7, and Tokyo International Film Festival in Japan on October 24. (Note: Attributed to these references:)

== Plot ==
In 1970, at a remote coastal village somewhere in the country, mysterious things occur as wails are heard from the forest, cows are hacked to death, a man is found bleeding to death at the crossroad, and houses are burned.

In the year 1972, President Ferdinand Marcos publicly announced Proclamation No. 1081, a law that put the entire country under Martial Law. Everything became a mess when the Armed Forces of the Philippines decided to camp in the barrio. Or was it already messed up before?

== Production ==
The story is inspired by filmmaker Lav Diaz's childhood during Martial Law, when he witnessed the gunfights between government militias and rebels, bombings, village burnings, and deaths of numerous civilians in his home province.

== Cast ==
- Perry Dizon as Sito
- Roeder as Tony
- Hazel Orencio as Itang
- Karenina Haniel as Joselina
- Reynan Abcede as Hakob
- Mailes Kanapi as Heding
- Ching Valdes-Aran as Babu
- Joel Saracho as Father Guido

== Reception ==
=== Critical response ===
Rotten Tomatoes, a review aggregator, gives the film an approval rating of 89% based on 9 reviews, with a weighted average of 7/10.

Mark Angelo Ching, writing for Philippine Entertainment Portal, gave praise to Diaz's direction and cinematography, the set design, and the cast's acting performances.

=== Accolades ===
Award-giving organization / Film Festival	Date of ceremony	Category	Recipient(s)	Result	Ref.
67th Locarno Film Festival	August 16, 2014	Golden Leopard (Best Film)	From What Is Before	Won	
38th Gawad Urian Awards	June 16, 2015	Best Film	From What Is Before	Won	
38th Gawad Urian Awards	June 16, 2015	Best Direction	Lav Diaz	Won	
38th Gawad Urian Awards	June 16, 2015	Best Screenplay	Lav Diaz	Won	
38th Gawad Urian Awards	June 16, 2015	Best Editing	Lav Diaz	Won	
38th Gawad Urian Awards	June 16, 2015	Best Production Design	Perry Dizon	Nominated	
38th Gawad Urian Awards	June 16, 2015	Best Sound	Marc Locsin	Nominated	
38th Gawad Urian Awards	June 16, 2015	Best Actress	Hazel Orencio	Nominated	
38th Gawad Urian Awards	June 16, 2015	Best Supporting Actor	Roeder Camañag	Nominated	
38th Gawad Urian Awards	June 16, 2015	Best Supporting Actor	Noel Sto. Domingo	Nominated	
38th Gawad Urian Awards	June 16, 2015	Best Supporting Actress	Karenina Haiel	Nominated	

== See also ==
- List of longest films
