= Where I Am King =

2014 Filipino comedy film

- Film poster
- Directed by: Carlos Siguion-Reyna
- Written by: Bibeth Orteza
- Starring: Robert Arevalo
- Release date: August 2, 2014
- Running time: 91 minutes
- Country: Philippines
- Language: Filipino

Where I Am King (Tagalog: Hari ng Tondo) is a 2014 Philippine comedy film directed by Carlos Siguion-Reyna. It was selected to be screened in the Contemporary World Cinema section at the 2014 Toronto International Film Festival.

== Synopsis ==
Ricardo, a wealthy elderly man is on a brink of brancruptcy. He was forced to sell his remaining real estate assets and returns to Tondo, a placed where he grew up. Along the way, he invites his spoiled grandchildren to live with him in Alapaap, a decrepit building which he owns. Richards hopes to teach his grandchildren the hardship of life, develop a thick skin and grow as responsible adults.

== Cast ==
- Robert Arevalo as Ricardo Villena
- Liza Lorena as Melissa
- Rez Cortez as Boyong
- Aiza Seguerra as Tambay
- Cris Villonco as Anna
- Ciara Sotto as Battered girlfriend
- Rafa Siguion-Reyna as Ricky
- Eric Quizon as Daniel
- Ali Sotto as Olivia
- Audie Gemora as Julio
