= Norte, the End of History =

2013 film by Lav Diaz

- Theatrical release poster
- Directed by: Lav Diaz
- Screenplay by: Lav Diaz; Rody Vera
- Story by: Rody Vera; Michiko Yamamoto; Raymond Lee (Note: Raymond Lee is the name of writer Moira Lang before transition; she was both credited as "Raymond Lee" and "Moira Lang" in this film.)
- Produced by: Moira Lang
- Starring: Sid Lucero; Angeli Bayani; Archie Alemania; Angelina Kanapi; Soliman Cruz; Mae Paner; Hazel Orencio
- Cinematography: Lauro Rene Manda
- Edited by: Lav Diaz
- Music by: Perry Dizon
- Production companies: Wacky O Productions; Kayan Productions; Origin8 Media
- Distributed by: Cinema Guild
- Release dates: May 23, 2013 (Cannes); September 10, 2014 (Philippines)
- Running time: 250 minutes
- Country: Philippines
- Languages: Filipino; English

Norte, the End of History (Filipino: Norte, Hangganan ng Kasaysayan) is a 2013 Philippine psychological drama film edited and directed by Lav Diaz and co-written by Rody Vera from a story concept he co-developed with Michiko Yamamoto and Raymond Lee. Lasting for more than four hours, the film explores themes of crime, class, and family.

Screened at the Un Certain Regard section at the 2013 Cannes Film Festival, as well as the 2013 Toronto International Film Festival, the main slate of 2013 New York Film Festival, and the Masters section of the 2013 San Diego Asian Film Festival, the film has received wide acclaim for its riveting storytelling and unique cinematography. The film also won four awards including Best Picture and Best Actress at the 2014 Gawad Urian Awards.

The film had a limited release in the Philippines on March 11, 2014, and its wide theatrical release on September 10, 2014. It was selected as the Filipino entry for the Best Foreign Language Film at the 87th Academy Awards, but was not nominated.

== Plot ==
The lives of three people take a turn when one of them commits a crime.

Joaquin (Archie Alemania) fails miserably at providing for his family. When his money lender gets murdered by disillusioned law student Fabian (Sid Lucero), the crime is pinned on Joaquin. In prison, he is transformed by misery and solitude.

Left to fend for the family, his wife, Eliza (Angeli Bayani), pours all of her strength into battling despair as she ekes out a living for their children.

The real perpetrator, Fabian, roams free. His disillusionment with his country—its history of revolutions marred by betrayal and crimes unpunished—drives him to the edge of insanity.

== Cast ==
- Sid Lucero as Fabian
- Angeli Bayani as Eliza
- Archie Alemania as Joaquin
- Angelina Kanapi as Hoda
- Soliman Cruz as Wakwak
- Hazel Orencio as Ading
- Mae Paner as Magda

== Reception ==
=== Critical response ===
Norte, the End of History received critical acclaim upon its release. On the review aggregator website Rotten Tomatoes, 93% of 41 critics' reviews are positive, with an average rating of 8.1/10. The website's consensus reads: "Its four-hour length is undeniably imposing, but Norte, the End of History rewards patient viewers with an absorbing, visually expansive viewing experience." Metacritic, which uses a weighted average, assigned the film a score of 81 out of 100, based on 10 critics, indicating "universal acclaim".

A.O. Scott of New York Times writes, "More than four hours long, filmed in expansive takes with almost no close-ups and very few camera movements, Lav Diaz's "Norte, the End of History" is a tour de force of slow cinema. It is the work of a director as fascinated by decency as by ugliness, and able to present the chaos of life in a series of pictures that are at once luminously clear and endlessly mysterious."

Neil Young of The Hollywood Reporter gave an underwhelming review by saying, "There's little in the way of genuine depth, complexity or nuance here, Diaz instead seeks to convey the illusion of profundity by having various characters throw around weighty social and philosophical verbiage in thuddingly sophomoric fashion."

At the end of 2013, British magazine Sight & Sound listed Norte as one of the Top 10 films of 2013, tying for the ninth spot with the French film Stranger by the Lake. The film also was chosen by the International Cinephile Society Awards 2014 as one of the Best Films not released in 2013. Norte was also ranked at #15 at Film Comment's Top 20 Best Films of 2014.

Rolling Stone listed the film as one of the Top 100 Best Movies of the 21st Century at number 98.

=== Accolades ===
Year	Event	Category	Recipient	Result
2013	Cannes Film Festival	Prix Un Certain Regard	Norte, the End of History	Nominated
2013	Cinemanila International Film Festival	(Best Film) Lino Brocka Award	Norte, the End of History	Nominated
2013	Cinemanila International Film Festival	Best Director Award	Lav Diaz	Won
2013	International Cinephile Society Awards	Best Picture not released in 2013	Norte, the End of History	Won
2013	Nuremberg International Human Rights Film Festival	Nuremberg International Human Rights Film Award	Norte, the End of History	Won
2014	Gawad Urian Awards	Best Picture	Norte, the End of History	Won
2014	Gawad Urian Awards	Best Actor	Sid Lucero	Nominated
2014	Gawad Urian Awards	Best Actress	Angeli Bayani	Won
2014	Gawad Urian Awards	Best Supporting Actor	Archie Alemania	Nominated
2014	Gawad Urian Awards	Best Director	Lav Diaz	Nominated
2014	Gawad Urian Awards	Best Screenplay	Lav Diaz and Rody Vera	Won
2014	Gawad Urian Awards	Best Cinematography	Lauro Manda	Won
2014	Gawad Urian Awards	Best Music	Perry Dizon	Nominated
2014	Gawad Urian Awards	Best Editing	Lav Diaz	Nominated
2014	Gawad Urian Awards	Best Sound	Corinne de San Jose	Nominated
2014	Golden Screen Awards	Best Motion Picture (Drama)	Norte, the End of History	Nominated
2014	Golden Screen Awards	Best Director	Lav Diaz	Nominated
2014	Golden Screen Awards	Best Original Screenplay	Rody Vera; Lav Diaz	Nominated
2014	Golden Screen Awards	Best Original Story	Rody Vera; Michiko Yamamoto; Raymond Lee	Nominated
2015	Film Independent Spirit Awards	Best Foreign Film	Lav Diaz	Nominated
2015	London Film Critics' Circle Awards	Best Foreign Language Film of the Year	Lav Diaz	Nominated

== See also ==
- List of submissions to the 87th Academy Awards for Best Foreign Language Film
- List of Philippine submissions for the Academy Award for Best Foreign Language Film
