= Angeli Bayani =

Filipino actress

- Born: Quezon City, Philippines
- Occupation: Actress
- Years active: 2002–present

Angeli Bayani is a Filipino actress. She is best known for starring in Philippine art-house and independent films notably those by Lav Diaz's Melancholia (2008), Century of Birthing (2011), and Norte, the End of History (2013) for which she won the 2014 Gawad Urian Award for Best Actress. She also appeared in the Camera d'Or-winning Singaporean film Ilo Ilo (2013) by Anthony Chen.

== Filmography ==
=== Television ===
Year	Title	Role	Type of Role
2009	Nagsimula sa Puso	Eloisa	Guest Role
2009	Maalaala Mo Kaya: Salamin	Arlene	Episode guest
2010	Your Song: Beautiful Girl	Bar Host	Episode guest
2011	Angelito: Batang Ama	Maggie	Guest Role
2013	Never Say Goodbye	Clara	Supporting Role
2013	Bayan Ko	Nena Santiago	Main Role
2014	Wansapanataym: Enchanted House	Mangkukulam	Episode guest / Antagonist
2014	Wattpad Presents: Poser	Joan	Episode guest
2014	Niño	Helen	Recurring role / Antagonist
2015	Let the Love Begin	Yaya Eds	Supporting role
2015	Buena Familia	Luz	Guest Role
2015	Karelasyon: Blackmail	Mika	Episode guest
2016	That's My Amboy	Neng	Guest Role
2016	Maalaala Mo Kaya: Kahon	young Yolly	Episode guest
2017	Magpakailanman: Losing Jeffrey, Finding Jayson (The Jayson Tomas Story)	Liza	Episode guest
2017	Wagas: Tiyanak (Bantayan ang inyong Anak!)	Amy	Episode guest
2017	Magpakailanman: Nika Manika (The Possessed Doll)	Naida	Episode guest
2018	Tadhana: Linlang	Melinda	Episode guest
2018	Contessa	Yolly	Guest Role / Antagonist
2018	Wagas: Ang Tinig ni Jennifer	Josephine	Episode guest
2018	My Special Tatay	Myrna Palomares Labrador	Recurring Role / Antagonist
2018	Magpakailanman: Ina, Dapat Ba Kitang Patawarin?	Loida	Episode guest
2018	Tadhana: Lunok	Carmen	Episode guest
2020–2021	Love of My Life	Rosanna "Osang" Layug	Guest Protagonist
2021	Gen Z	Vangie Garcia	Supporting Role / Protagonist
2022	The Broken Marriage Vow	Dr. Sandy Alipio	Supporting Role / Protagonist
2023	Senior High	Edith Castro	Supporting Role / Protagonist / Anti-Hero
2024	High Street	Edith Castro	Supporting Role / Protagonist / Anti-Hero

=== Movies ===
Feature films
Year	Title	Role	Notes
2003	Ang Huling Birhen sa Lupa	GRO	
2003	Filipinas	Field reporter	
2005	Sitak	Young Wife	
2006	Ang Huling Araw ng Linggo	Julie	Segment: "Huwebes"
2007	Death in the Land of Encantos	Catalina	
2008	Adela	Marcy	
2008	Imoral	Abi's sister	
2008	Melancholia	Alberta Munoz / Jenine	Cinemanila International Film Festival Best Actress; Nominated—Gawad Urian Award for Best Actress
2008	Huling Biyahe		
2008	UPCAT	Nanay	
2008	Kolorete	Magdalena	
2009	Esclaves des mers		
2009	Squalor		
2009	Panahon Na	Ava	
2009	Ang Laro ng Buhay ni Juan	Mercy	
2010	Ben & Sam	Professor Castro	
2010	Pink Halo-Halo		
2010	Muli	Nerissa	
2010	Chassis		
2010	Presa		
2011	Baby Factory	Gina	
2011	Century of Birthing	Eliza	
2011	Ka Oryang		Nominated—Gawad Urian Award for Best Supporting Actress
2011	Haruo		
2012	Graceland	Lina Villar	
2012	Kalayaan		
2012	Lilet Never Happened	Rosing	
2012	Crossroads		
2013	Norte, the End of History	Eliza	Gawad Urian Award for Best Actress
2013	Palad ta ang Nagbuot		
2013	Ilo Ilo	Terry	Nominated—Asia-Pacific Film Festival for Best Actress
2013	Purok 7		
2013	Lauriana		
2013	Tinik		
2013	The Guerilla Is a Poet	Young Julieta de Lima	
2014	Bwaya	Divina Romano	
2014	Ronda		
2017	Maestra	Gennie Panguelo	
2021	Holy Emy	Lida	
2021	Onoda: 10,000 Nights in the Jungle	Iniez	
2023	In My Mother's Skin	Amor	
