= Gusto Kita with All My Hypothalamus =

2018 romantic drama film by Dwein Baltazar

- Theatrical release poster
- Directed by: Dwein Baltazar
- Written by: Dwein Baltazar
- Produced by: Jun Robles Lana; Perci Intalan; Madonna Tarrayo; Bianca Balbuena
- Starring: Iana Bernardez; Nicco Manalo; Anthony Falcon; Dylan Ray Talon; Soliman Cruz; Ash Nicanor
- Cinematography: Neil Daza
- Edited by: Ilsa Malsi
- Music by: Myka Magsaysay; Paul Magsaysay
- Production companies: EpicMedia Productions; The IdeaFirst Company; Monoxide Works; Quiapo Collective; Cignal Entertainment
- Distributed by: Solar Pictures
- Release dates: May 9, 2018 (CineFilipino); August 15, 2018 (Philippines)
- Running time: 105 minutes
- Country: Philippines
- Language: Filipino

Gusto Kita with All My Hypothalamus is a 2018 Philippine romantic drama film written and directed by Dwein Baltazar. It stars Iana Bernadez, Nicco Manalo, Anthony Falcon, Dylan Ray Talon and Soliman Cruz. The story follows four men as they realize they are all searching for the same woman.

The film won several awards, including FAMAS Awards for Best Picture, Best Original Screenplay, and Best Director in 2019 and NETPAC Award and Asian Film Observatory Award at the 2018 Golden Horse Film Festival and Awards in Taiwan.

== Synopsis ==
In the busy streets of downtown Manila, Avenida serves as the stage for the story of four lonely men named Caloy, Obeng, Alex, and Lando who are yearning for something they cannot quite put their hands on - a missing puzzle piece, who happens to be Aileen, a mysterious girl. What started as innocent infatuation turns into an obsession for these men, who go the extra mile for her.

== Cast ==
- Iana Bernadez as Aileen
- Nicco Manalo as Caloy
- Anthony Falcon as Obeng
- Dyan Ray Talon as Alex
- Soliman Cruz as Lando
- Ash Nicanor as Pam
- Nestor Abrogena Jr. as Nestor
- Angely Castoverde as Maritess

== Reception ==
The Cinema Evaluation Board (CEB) gave the film a zero rating. After receiving a non-rated ratings, Director Perci Intalan said, he respects the CEB decision but feels that it took a dangerous turn because CEB is created for film industry incentives, not guide the public viewing options, which is the MTRCB responsibility. Baltazar expresses her disappointment with a sick imagination face on her social media account. Veteran writer Ricky Lee is dismayed by CEB's grading of the film.

Film Development Council of the Philippines (FDCP) Chairperson Liza Diño responded to CEB criticisms by saying there is no such thing as zero rating but only A and B, but before a movie is graded, it will go through a pre-qualification procedure. She clarified that during the pre-qualification process, there were nine (9) reviewers and five of them voted for, "no", while the remaining four voted for "yes".

== Release date ==
The film opened nationwide in selected theaters on August 15, 2018.

It has been featured in different film festivals over the years, including the CineFilipino Film Festival, Cinemalaya International Film Festival, Pista ng Pelikulang Pilipino, Busan International Film Festival, 5th Trifecta Film Festival.

In 2025, the movie was re-released in cinemas by Film Development Council of the Philippines (FDCP) via Sine50 Pelikula ng Bayan program from September 17–23, 2025 at Robinsons Galleria, Gateway Cineplex, SM Mall of Asia, and Trinoma Cinemas.

== Accolades ==
Awards and nominations received by Zig Dulay
Organization	Year	Nominated Work	Category	Result	Ref.
CineFilipino Film Festival	2018	Best Picture	Gusto Kita with All my Hypothalamus	Nominated	
CineFilipino Film Festival	2018	Best Ensemble	Gusto Kita with All my Hypothalamus	Won	
CineFilipino Film Festival	2018	Best Director	Dwein Baltazar	Nominated	
CineFilipino Film Festival	2018	Best Actress	Iana Bernardez	Nominated	
CineFilipino Film Festival	2018	Best Actor	Soliman Cruz	Nominated	
CineFilipino Film Festival	2018	Best Actor	Nicco Manalo	Nominated	
CineFilipino Film Festival	2018	Best Supporting Actor	Nestor Abrogena	Nominated	
CineFilipino Film Festival	2018	Best Supporting Actor	Anthony Falcon	Nominated	
CineFilipino Film Festival	2018	Best Screenplay	Dwein Baltazar	Nominated	
CineFilipino Film Festival	2018	Best Cinematography	Neil Daza	Nominated	
CineFilipino Film Festival	2018	Best Production Design	Maolen Fadul	Won	
CineFilipino Film Festival	2018	Best Musical Score	Myka Magsaysay and Paul Sofia	Won	
CineFilipino Film Festival	2018	Best Sound	Bayan Dumaguina and Axel Fernandez	Nominated	
FAMAS Award	2019	Best Film	Gusto Kita with All My Hypothalamus	Won	
FAMAS Award	2019	Best Director	Dwein Baltazar	Won	
FAMAS Award	2019	Best Original Screenplay	Dwein Baltazar	Won	
FAMAS Award	2019	Outstanding Performance of an Actor in a Supporting role	Soliman Cruz	Nominated	
FAMAS Award	2019	Outstanding Achievement in Cinematography	Niel Daza	Nominated	
FAMAS Award	2019	Outstanding Achievement in Editing	Llasa Malsi	Nominated	
FAMAS Award	2019	Outstanding Achievement in Sound	Axel Fernandez	Nominated	
Hong Kong Asian Film Festival (HKAFF)	2018	New Talent Award	Dwein Baltazar	Nominated	
Gawad Urian Award	2019	Best Screenplay	Dwein Baltazar	Nominated	
Golden Horse Film Festival and Awards	2018	Gusto Kita with All My Hypothalamus	Network for Promotion of Asian Cinema - NETPAC Award	Won	
Golden Horse Film Festival and Awards	2018	Gusto Kita with All My Hypothalamus	Asian Observatory Film Award	Won	
Luna Awards (FAP)	2019	Best Film	Gusto Kita with All My Hypothalamus	Nominated	
Luna Awards (FAP)	2019	Best Director	Dweine Baltazar	Nominated	
Luna Awards (FAP)	2019	Best Actor	Nicco Manalo	Nominated	
Luna Awards (FAP)	2019	Best Cinematography	Niel Daza	Won	
Luna Awards (FAP)	2019	Best Production Design	Maolen Fadul	Won	
Luna Awards (FAP)	2019	Best Sound	Axel Fernandez	Nominated	
PMPC Star Awards for Movies	2019	New Movie Actress of the Year	Iana Bernardez	Nominated	
Osaka Asian Film Festival	2019	Best Film	Gusto Kita with All My Hypothalamus	Nominated	
