= The Janitor (2014 film) =

- Theatrical release poster
- Directed by: Michael Tuviera
- Written by: Aloy Adlawan; Michael Tuviera
- Produced by: Ramil David; Jojo Oconer; Michael Tuviera
- Starring: Dennis Trillo; Richard Gomez; Derek Ramsay; Ricky Davao; Raymond Bagatsing
- Production company: APT Entertainment
- Distributed by: Star Cinema
- Release dates: August 2, 2014 (Cinemalaya); October 8, 2014 (Philippines)
- Running time: 122 minutes
- Country: Philippines
- Language: Filipino

The Janitor is a 2014 Philippine crime thriller film, directed and produced by Michael Tuviera and co-written with Aloy Adlawan. It stars Dennis Trillo , Richard Gomez and Derek Ramsay. The story is loosely based on a real-life events in Philippines deadliest bank heist in 2008.

== Synopsis ==
A bank heist goes terribly wrong leaving ten people dead. Espina, a former police officer turned vigilante is assigned secretly to resolve the case and hunts down the culprit behind the robbery. As Espina finds each suspect, he unravels the dirty truth behind his extrajudicial duties.

== Cast ==
Main cast

- Dennis Trillo as Cristiano Espina
- Richard Gomez as Rudy Manapat
- Derek Ramsay as Dindo Marasigan

Supporting cast

- Ricky Davao as Wenceslao Bugaoisan
- Raymond Bagatsing as Enteng Homecillo
- Pen Medina as Roger Ponce
- Jerald Napoles as Matias Dimaranan
- Dante Rivero as Monching Espina
- Irma Adlawan as Erwin Espina
- LJ Reyes as Melba Espina
- Nicco Manalo as Junjun Carasco
- Ynez Veneracion as Connie Homecillo
- JC Santos as Lito Ponce/Juan Carlos Santos
- Sunshine Garcia as Kristal

== Production ==
Upon learning the bank robbery news, Tuviera was inspired by the concept of adapting real life events for film. During press conference, he discussed his lengthy research by interviewing both sides of the law. He interviewed a retired major in the police force. Tuviera also had a conversation with a professional assassin through the help of a middleman in a secluded location. He faced a delimma when Dennis Trillo insisted of joining him in the meeting. He described the hitman as normal person and the interview went smoothly.

Tuviera made two minor changes to keep the film in R-16 ratings to comply Movie and Television Review and Classification Board (MTRCB) guidelines. The film received a graded A ratings from Cinema Evaluation Board (CEB).

In preparation for the role, Trillo got tanned, darkening his skin and bulking up some muscles. He underwent intensive physical workout and trained for mixed martial arts.

== Release ==
The movie premiered on August 2, 2014 at the 10th Cinemalaya Film Festival and was screened for 10 days. Star Cinema partnered with APT Entertainment and released the film commercially in cinemas on October 8, 2014.

The film was also screened from February 27 to March 7, 2015 at the Fantasporto International Film Festival or Festival Internacional de Cinema do Porto held in Lisbon, Portugal.

== Accolades ==
Awards and nominations received by Zig Dulay
Organization	Year	Nominated Work	Category	Result	Ref.
Cinemalaya Independent Film Festival	2014	Best Film	The Janitor	Nominated	
Cinemalaya Independent Film Festival	2014	Best Director	Michael Tuviera	Won	
Cinemalaya Independent Film Festival	2014	Best Supporting Actor	Nicco Manalo	Won	
Cinemalaya Independent Film Festival	2014	Best Screenplay	Aloy Adlawan and Michael Tuviera	Won	
Cinemalaya Independent Film Festival	2014	Best Editing	Tara Illenberger	Won	
Cinemalaya Independent Film Festival	2014	Best Sound	Albert Michael Idioma	Won	
Gawad Urian Award	2015	Best Actor	Dennis Trillo	Nominated	
Gawad Urian Award	2015	Best Editing	Tara Illenberger	Nominated	
PMPC Star Awards for Movies	2015	Indie Movie of the Year	The Janitor	Won	
PMPC Star Awards for Movies	2015	Indie Movie Director of the Year	Michael Tuviera	Won	
PMPC Star Awards for Movies	2015	Movie Supporting Actor of the Year	Nicco Manalo	Won	
PMPC Star Awards for Movies	2015	Indie Movie Editor of the Year	Tara Illenberger	Won	
PMPC Star Awards for Movies	2015	Indie Movie Sound Engineer of the Year	Alex Tomboc and Albert Michael Idioma	Won	
PMPC Star Awards for Movies	2015	Best Actor	Dennis Trillo	Nominated	
PMPC Star Awards for Movies	2015	Indie Movie Screenwriter of the Year	Aloy Adlawan and Michael Tuviera	Nominated	
PMPC Star Awards for Movies	2015	Indie Cinematographer of the Year	Michael Floriendo	Nominated	
PMPC Star Awards for Movies	2015	Indie Movie Production Designer of the Year	Roy Lachica	Nominated	
PMPC Star Awards for Movies	2015	Indie Movie Musical Scorer of the Year	Richard Gonzales	Nominated	
Fantasporto International Film Festival	2015	Best Actor	Richard Gomez	Won	
