= Nicco Manalo =

Filipino actor and dancer (born 1986)

- Born: Sherwin Nicco Manalo; November 8, 1986 (age 39)
- Education: De La Salle–College of Saint Benilde
- Occupations: Actor, theater actor, dancer
- Years active: 2006–present
- Notable work: The Janitor; Barber's Tales; Gusto Kita with All My Hypothalamus; Mga Rebeldeng may Kaso
- Parents: Jose Manalo; Anna Lyn Santos
- Relatives: Benj Manalo (brother); Lovely Abella (sister-in-law)

Sherwin Nicco Manalo (born November 8, 1986) is a Filipino actor, singer, and dancer. He is the eldest son of comedian Jose Manalo and brother of Benj Manalo.

His accolades include Cinemalaya Best Supporting Actor, PMPC Star Awards for Movie Supporting Actor of the Year and Gawad Buhay Award including nominations from Gawad Urian Award, CineFilipino Film Festival, Luna Award and Young Critics Circle.

His critically acclaimed movies are The Janitor (2014), Barber's Tales (2014), Heneral Luna (2015), Mga Rebeldeng may Kaso (2015) and Gusto Kita with All My Hypothalamus (2018).

== Early life ==
Manalo was born on November 8, 1986. His parents are Jose Manalo, a comedian and Anna Lyn Santos. He is the eldest son with four younger siblings: Benj Manalo, actor and dancer, Myki Manalo, a resident medical doctor of Capitol Medical Center, Ai Manalo, an accountant manager and Colyn Manalo, a musician.

His mother, Anna Lyn Santos passed away on January 14, 2022.

He graduated college from De La Salle–College of Saint Benilde.

== Career ==
After college graduation, Manalo worked as a stage actor in 2006. His earlier theater plays include Batang Rizal, Marisol, Lola Basyang, Dogeaters and. Spring Awakening. In 2011, Manolo was cast as Ralph, playing the male lead in American Hwangap, for which he was nominated for Male Featured Lead Performance at 3rd Gawad Buhay Awards. He continued receiving nominations for his outstanding performance in the plays, Kleptomaniacs, This is Our Youth and 3 Suns and a Stars at the Gawad Buhay Awards.

In 2014, Manalo joined the cast of the crime-triller movie, The Janitor, which he won for Best Supporting Actor in Cinemalaya Independent Film Festival and Movie Actor of the Year at 31st PMPC Star Awards for Movies. In the same year, he was nominated at 38th Gawad Urian Awards Best Supporting Actor for playing the role of Edmond in the Barber's Tales.

In 2018, he was nominated for Best Actor at 37th Luna Awards and 2018 CineFilipino Film Festival for playing the role of Caloy in the romantic drama movie, Gusto Kita with All My Hypothalamus.

== Personal life ==
Manalo lives alone in a family owned exclusive village resort.

== Filmography ==
=== Theater ===
Year	Movie	Role	Refs.
2023–2024	Parokya ni Edgar: Musical	Mang Jose	
2020	The Boy-Boy and Friends Channel	Randy	
2019	Ang Huling El Bimbo: Musical	Young Emman	
2018–2019	Dekada '70: Musical	Willy	
2016–2018	Mula sa Buwan: Musical	Cyrano	
2015–2016	3 Stars and a Sun: Musical	Sol	
2015	This is Our Youth	Warren	
2014	Kleptomaniacs	Tabo	
2011	Titus Andronicus: Tinarantadong Asintado	clown	
2010	Baquereta	—N/a	
2010	American Hwangap	Ralph	
2010	Huling Habilin ng Sirena	—N/a	
2009	Spring Awakening	Mortiz	
2008	Marisol	—N/a	
2007	Batang Rizal	—N/a	
2007	Dogeaters	Richard	

=== Television ===
Year	Movie	Role	Refs.
2026	Someone, Someday	Roberto "Robbie" Jacinto	
2025	Maalaala Mo Kaya	—N/a	
2025	Lolong	Boy Kamot	
2025	Prinsesa ng City Jail	Pip (4 eps)	
2022	Panalo o Talo, it's you	Richie boy	
2021	Still	Jamie	
2021	Tadhana	Kokoy	
2019	Manilennials	—N/a	
2018	Baranggay 143	James	
2018	Ang Probinsyano	Peng	
2015–2016	Wansapanataym	Big Jimboy, Jamie	
2015	Ipaglaban Mo!	Greg	
2015	Nathaniel	Kidnapper	

=== Movies ===
Year	Movie	Role	Refs.
2025	Gabi ng Lagim: The Movie	Tawilis	
2025	100 Awit para kay Stella	—N/a	
2025	Out of Order	Tolits	
2024	Pagpag 24/7	Boying	
2023	Instant Daddy	Driver Johnny	
2023	The Ship Show	Direk Benny	
2023	Bela Luna	Gardy	
2022	An Inconvenient Love	Policeman	
2022	Luzonesis Osteoporosis	—N/a	
2021	Ikaw	Bert	
2019	Us, at the End of the Year	—N/a	
2018	Ang Pangarap kong Holdap	Holdaper	
2018	Gusto Kita with All My Hypothalamus	Caloy	
2017	Changing Partners	Pizza guy	
2017	Tayo sa huling buwan ng Taon	—N/a	
2016	How to Be Yours	—N/a	
2015	Pasan	Christian	
2015	Baka Siguro Yata	Japot	
2015	Mga Rebeldeng may Kaso	—N/a	
2015	Heneral Luna	President's aide	
2015	A Story of Us,that never was	Sam	
2015	Your still the One	Sherwin	
2014	The Real Trip	Mike	
2014	Operation Roque	Eduardo	
2014	Edna	—N/a	
2014	The Janitor	Junjun Carasco	
2013	Rematado	Adik2	
2013	10,000 Hours	Taxi passenger	
2013	Kimmy Dora: Ang Kiyemeng Prequel	Call center agent	
2013	Barber's Tales	Edmond	
2013	Bakit Hindi Ka Crush ng Crush Mo?	Reporter	
2013	Instant Mommy	Olops	
2013	Tuhog	Dr. Sanchez	
2012	Paglaya sa Tanikala	Marcus	
2012	The Other End	Leo	
2012	Supremo	—N/a	
2012	Melodrama Negra	—N/a	
2011	Zombading 1: Patayin sa Shokot si Remington	—N/a	
2011	San Lazaro	Biboy	
2010	Dagim	Ferdi	
2010	Breakfast with Lolo	Joey	
2010	Ang Paglilitis in Andres Bonifacio	—N/a	
2009	69 1/2	Epic dela Fuerza	
2008	#Cafe	Guy	
2004	Agleon	—N/a	

== Accolades ==
=== Theater ===
- Outstanding Ensemble Performance (winner) in a play for American Hwangap at the 3rd Gawad Buhay Awards.
- Nominated for Male Featured Performance in a play for American Hwangap at the 3rd Gawad Buhay Awards.
- Nominated for Male Lead Performance in a Musical play for Kleptomaniacs (TM) at 6th Gawad Buhay Awards.
- Nominated for Male Lead Performance in a play for This is Our Youth (RTT) at the 7th Gawad Buhay Awards.
- Nominated for Male Lead Performance in a Musical play for 3 Stars and a Sun (PETA) at 8th Gawad Buhay Awards.

=== Movie ===
- Movie Supporting Actor of the Year for The Janitor at the 31st PMPC Star Awards for Movies.
- Best Supporting Actor for The Janitor at the 2014 Cinemalaya Independent Film Festival.
- Best Ensemble Jury Prize winner for Gusto Kita with All My Hypothalamus at the CineFilipino Film Festival.
- Nominated for Best Supporting Actor for Barber's Tales at the 38th Gawad Urian Awards.
- Nominated for Best Actor in Gusto Kita with All My Hypothalamus at the 37th Luna Awards.
- Nominated for Best Actor in Gusto Kita with All of my Hypothalamus at the CineFilipino Film Festival.
- Nominated for Best Performance in Mga Rebeldeng may Kaso (cast) at the 2016 Young Critics Circle Awards.
