= Quick change (disambiguation) =

Quick change, quick-change or Quick Change may refer to

- Quick Change, 1990 American comedy film
- Quick Change (2013 film), 2013 Philippine drama film
- Quick-change (music), a variation of the twelve-bar blues
- Quick-change (performance), a magic trick where a performer will quickly change attire
- Quick-change scam, a scammer confuses staff by repeatedly changing the means of payment
