= Out of Order (2025 Philippine film) =

- Release movie poster
- Directed by: Richard R. Faulkerson Jr.
- Written by: Randy Q. Villanueva; Atty. Karen Lustica; Ryan Evangelista; Richard R. Faulkerson Jr.
- Produced by: Vicent del Rosario III; Vic del Rosario Jr. Veronique del Rosario Corpus; Valerie del Rosario
- Starring: Alden Richards; Heaven Peralejo; Nonie Buencamino; Soliman Cruz; Nicco Manalo; Joyce Ching
- Production companies: Viva Films; Studio Viva; Myriad Entertainment
- Distributed by: Netflix PH
- Release dates: July 2, 2025 (Vietnam); September 19, 2025 (India); October 2, 2025 (Philippines)
- Running time: 105 minutes
- Country: Philippines
- Language: Filipino

Out of Order is a 2025 Philippine legal thriller film directed by Richard Faulkerson Jr., in his feature directorial debut and co-written by Randy Q. Villanueva, Atty. Karen Lustica and Ryan Evangelista. The film stars Alden Richards, Heaven Peralejo, Nonie Buencamino with Soliman Cruz, Nicco Manalo, Joyce Ching and a special participation of Ms. Annette Gozon-Valdes.

== Synopsis ==
Alex is a rookie lawyer, reluctantly agrees to be his estranged father David defense counsel in a homicide trial, squaring off his prosecutor ex-girlfriend Jenny in the courtroom. While trying to unlock the murder and prove his father's innocence, Alex finds himself more and more involved in the case.

== Cast ==
Main Cast

- Alden Richards as Atty. Alex Roman
  - Euwenn Mikaell as young Alex Roman
- Heaven Peralejo as Atty. Jennifer Templo
- Nonie Buencamino as Atty. David Roman
- Yayo Aguila as Elizabeth Roman
- Nicco Manalo as Tolits
- Joyce Ching as Gabbie
- Soliman Cruz as Atty. Nicolas Maximo

=== Special participation ===
- Francine Garcia as Nadja Galang
- Tenten Mendoza as Gigi
- Andrea del Rosario as Sofia Galang
- Annette Gozon-Valdes as Judge Welhilmina Corpuz-Pedad

Extended cast

- Jonathan Veloso as Balat
- Michael Canoy as Buknoy
- Archie Daguinod as Sgt. Gatdula
- Mark de Guzman as Sgt. Gomez
- Mitch Gensis as Junilin
- Star Orjaliza as Brenda
- Joshua Cabiladas as Baltazar
- Rey Noel Roylo as Medico-legal officer

== Production ==
=== Pre-production ===
Prior to filming, Peralejo had a personal role immersion for her character and would tag along with her friend, an Ateneo law student to observe a court hearing at San Juan Hall of Justice. For their characters immersion, Richards and Heaven Peralejo watched the actual court proceedings everyday for a week at the Quezon City Hall of Justice. Richard said that wearing several hats of responsibility was very challenging for him.

=== Filming ===
The filming began from November to December 2023 in Laguna and Taguig City. Principal Photography for the film was in January 2024. Originally, the film was 3 and 1/2 hours long but was trimmed down to abide Netflix standards.

== Release ==
The film was an official entry to the 3rd Da Nang Asian International Film Festival (DANAFF) in Vietnam, which was screened from June 29 to July 5, 2025. Out of Order was an official entry to 2025 Jagran Film Festival in Mumbai, India. The movie was released on October 2, 2025 on Netflix Philippines, it landed on the number 1 spot in the top 10 most watched movies.

== Accolades ==
Organization	Year	Category	Recipient(s)	Result	Ref.
NDM+ Awards	2026	Best Supporting Actress	Heaven Peralejo	Won	
