= Hustisya =

- Film poster
- Directed by: Joel Lamangan
- Written by: Ricky Lee
- Produced by: Harlene Bautista
- Starring: Nora Aunor; Rocco Nacino; Rosanna Roces; Sunshine Dizon
- Cinematography: Nap Jamir
- Edited by: Vanessa de Leon
- Music by: Emerzon Texon
- Production company: Likhang Silangan Entertainment
- Release date: August 2, 2014 (Cinemalaya)
- Country: Philippines
- Language: Filipino

Hustisya (English: Justice) is a 2014 Filipino political thriller-drama film starring Nora Aunor. The film is about a woman working for a human trafficking agency. The film was written by Ricky Lee and directed by Joel Lamangan

The film is one of the official entries to the Directors Showcase of the 10th Cinemalaya Independent Film Festival. The film had its international premiere at the 2014 Toronto International Film Festival, under the Contemporary World Cinema selection.

== Cast ==
- Nora Aunor as Virginia Cabahug / Biring
- Rocco Nacino as Atty. Gerald
- Rosanna Roces as Divina
- Sunshine Dizon
- Romnick Sarmenta
- Chynna Ortaleza as Kristal
- Gardo Versoza as Gardo
- Sue Prado
- Jeric Gonzales as Michael
- Chanel Latorre

== Release ==
The film was exhibited at the following festivals:

- 10th Cinemalaya Independent Film Festival
- 2014 Toronto International Film Festival
- 30th Warsaw International Film Festival (Competition), Poland October 10–19, 2014
- 36th Festival des 3 Continents, Nantes France, (Competition) November 25 - December 2, 2014
- 13th Pune International Film Festival (Competition), India, January 8–15, 2015

== Reception ==
The film received mixed reviews from critics, praising the performance of Nora Aunor while criticizing the plot. The Hollywood Reporter praised Aunor's performance: "The film's first 15 minutes is Aunor's masterclass of nuanced acting."

== Awards and recognition ==
=== International ===
Year	Group	Category	Nominee	Result
2014	Asia Pacific Screen Awards	Best Performance by an Actress	Nora Aunor	Nominated

=== Philippines ===
Year	Group	Category	Nominee	Result
2014	10th Cinemalaya Independent Film Festival (Director's Showcase)	Best Actress	Nora Aunor	Won
2014	10th Cinemalaya Independent Film Festival (Director's Showcase)	NETPAC Award		Won
2014	10th Cinemalaya Independent Film Festival (Director's Showcase)	Audience Choice		Won
2014	10th Cinemalaya Independent Film Festival (Director's Showcase)	Best Film		Nominated
2015	17th Gawad Pasado	Best Actress	Nora Aunor	Won
2015	17th Gawad Pasado	Best Story	Ricky Lee	Won
2015	17th Gawad Pasado	Best Editing	Vanessa de Leon	Won
2015	17th Gawad Pasado	Best Picture		Nominated
2015	17th Gawad Pasado	Best Director	Joel Lamangan	Nominated
2015	17th Gawad Pasado	Best Supporting Actor	Rocco Nacino	Nominated
2015	17th Gawad Pasado	Best Supporting Actor	Rocco Nacino	Nominated
2015	17th Gawad Pasado	Best Supporting Actress	Rossana Roces	Nominated
2015	63rd FAMAS Awards	Best Picture		Nominated
2015	63rd FAMAS Awards	Best Director	Joel Lamangan	Nominated
2015	63rd FAMAS Awards	Best Actor	Rocco Nacino	Nominated
2015	63rd FAMAS Awards	Best Supporting Actor	Romnick Sarmenta	Nominated
2015	63rd FAMAS Awards	Best Supporting Actress	Rossana Roces	Nominated
2015	63rd FAMAS Awards	Best Story	Ricky Lee	Nominated
2015	63rd FAMAS Awards	Best Screenplay	Ricky Lee	Nominated
2015	63rd FAMAS Awards	Best Editing	Vanessa de Leon	Nominated
2015	63rd FAMAS Awards	Best Cinematography	Nap Jamir II	Nominated
2015	63rd FAMAS Awards	Best Production Design	Edgar Martin Littaua	Nominated
2015	63rd FAMAS Awards	Best Sound	Lamberto Casas Jr.	Nominated
2015	63rd FAMAS Awards	Best Musical Score	Emerzon Texon	Nominated
