= Andoy Ranay =

Filipino director and actor

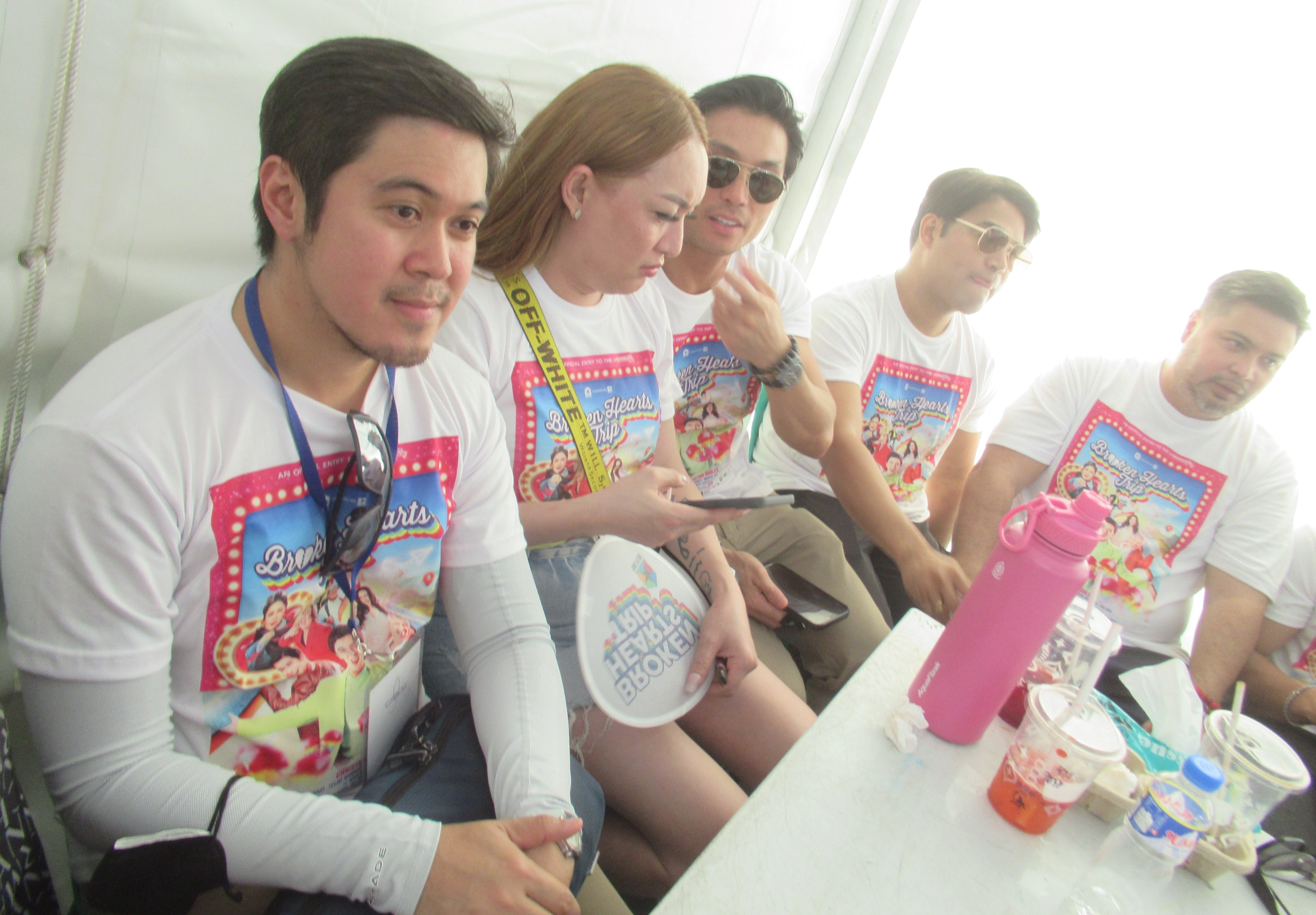
- Broken Hearts Trip
- Born: Randolph Lastrilla Ranay; Philippines
- Occupations: Director; actor
- Years active: 1998–present
- Employers: ABS-CBN (2001–2008; 2015–present); GMA Network (2009–2015)

Randolph "Andoy" Lastrilla Ranay is a Filipino director and theater practitioner. He has directed several television series for ABS-CBN, including The Broken Marriage Vow (2022), Dirty Linen (2023), and Senior High (2023–2024). He has also directed and appeared in multiple stage productions.

== Early life and education ==
Randolph Lastrilla Ranay is from Ilocos Norte. He studied Theater Arts at the University of the Philippines Diliman, and was associated with the university's theater group, Dulaang UP.

== Controversy ==
During the production of the series First Time in 2010, Ranay reportedly used offensive language toward actor Jake Vargas. GMA Network later issued a statement, saying that Ranay had apologized for his actions.

== Filmography ==
=== Director ===
==== Film ====
Year	Title	Notes	Ref.
2011	My Valentine Girls	Segment: BBF	
2012	Sosy Problems		
2013	When the Love Is Gone		
2014	Diary ng Panget		
2014	Trophy Wife		
2014	Talk Back and You're Dead		
2015	Para sa Hopeless Romantic		
2016	Lumayo Ka Nga sa Akin	Segment: Shake, Shaker, Shakest	
2019	Open		
2020	Love Lockdown		
2024	RoadTrip		

==== Television ====
Year	Title	Notes	Ref.
2001–2003	Sa Dulo ng Walang Hanggan	with Wenn V. Deramas	
2002	Maalaala Mo Kaya: Dictionary	with Wenn V. Deramas	
2002	Maalaala Mo Kaya: Makeup Kit	with Wenn V. Deramas	
2003	Maalaala Mo Kaya: Baby Book	with Wenn V. Deramas	
2003	Maalaala Mo Kaya: Kutsilyo	with Wenn V. Deramas	
2003	Maalaala Mo Kaya: Ilaw Ng Poste	with Wenn V. Deramas	
2004	Marina	with Wenn V. Deramas	
2005	'Til Death Do Us Part	with John-D Lazatin	
2005	Maalaala Mo Kaya: Chalk		
2005	Kampanerang Kuba	with Wenn V. Deramas	
2007	Love Spell: "Click na Click"	Season 3	
2007–2008	Prinsesa ng Banyera	with Rechie A. Del Carmen	
2009	All My Life	with Mac Alejandre	
2009	Stairway to Heaven	with Mac Alejandre & Joyce E. Bernal	
2010	First Time		
2010	Pilyang Kerubin		
2010	Endless Love	with Mac Alejandre	
2011	I Heart You, Pare!	with Joyce E. Bernal	
2011	Time of My Life	with Mark A. Reyes	
2012	Legacy	with Jay Altarejos	
2012	Hiram na Puso	with Roderick Lindayag	
2012	One True Love		
2013	Magpakailanman: The Lucy Aroma Story		
2013	Magpakailanman: My Only Love – True Love Story of Leonard and Nonyx Buela		
2013	Mundo Mo'y Akin		
2013	Magpakailanman: Peligro Sa Sariling Bahay – The Art Evangelista Story		
2013	Magpakailanman: Lola Putol - The Veronica Martinez Story		
2014	Magpakailanman: My Special Love		
2014	Magpakailanman: My Love Forever		
2014	Ang Dalawang Mrs. Real		
2014–2015	More Than Words		
2015	Ipaglaban Mo!: May Hangganan Ang Lahat		
2015	Wansapanataym: I Heart Kuryente Kid		
2016–2017	Till I Met You	with Antoinette Jadaone	
2017–2018	The Good Son	with Manny Palo & Jerome Pobocan	
2019	Sino ang Maysala?: Mea Culpa	with Dan Villegas, Darnel Joy Villaflor & Jerry Lopez Sineneng	
2019	Call Me Tita		
2019	Maalaala Mo Kaya: Hot Choco		
2020	Love Thy Woman	with Jeffrey Jeturian, Jojo Saguin & Jerry Lopez Sineneng	
2021	My Sunset Girl		
2021	Di Na Muli		
2022	Click, Like, Share	Season 3	
2022	The Broken Marriage Vow		
2023	Dirty Linen	with Onat Diaz	
2023–2024	Senior High	with Onat Diaz	
2024	Pamilya Sagrado	with Lawrence Fajardo & Rico Navarro	
2025–2026	Roja	with Raymund Ocampo, Lawrence Fajardo & Rico Navarro	
2026	Someone, Someday	with Chad V. Vidanes & Dolly Dulu	

==== Theater ====
Year	Production	Venue	Notes	Ref.
2012	Digital Divide	Tanghalang Huseng Batute (CCP Studio Theater)	8th Virgin Labfest Entry	
2017	Buwan at Baril	Ambassador Alfonso Yuchengco Auditorium		
2017	Hindi Ako Si Darna	Tanghalang Aurelio Tolentino (Little Theater)	13th Virgin Labfest Entry	

=== Acting roles ===
==== Film ====
Year	Title	Role	Notes	Ref.
1998	Pusong Mamon			
1999	Dito Sa Puso Ko	Production Assistant	Also credited as assistant director	
2000	Markova: Comfort Gay	Sophie		
2002	Pakisabi Na Lang... Mahal Ko Sya	Precious		
2002	Home Alone da Riber	Director		
2003	Ang Tanging Ina	Bruno		
2003	Duda	Cris		
2003	Crying Ladies	Hearse Driver		
2003	Malikmata	TV Reporter		
2005	Bathhouse	Genesis		
2005	Bikini Open			
2005	La Visa Loca	Tour Guide		
2006	D' Lucky Ones!	Sarhento		
2006	Misteryo ng Hapis			
2008	Ang Tanging Ina N'yong Lahat	Lobo Director / Bruno		
2009	Last Supper No. 3	PD Mamu		
2009	Colorum	Juan Luca Marco Mateo		
2009	24K	Shan		
2009	Labing Labing	Intern 1		
2009	Biyaheng Lupa	Gay Passenger		
2009	Shake, Rattle & Roll XI	Diablo	Voice role	
2009	Nobody, Nobody But... Juan	Randy		
2010	Ang Tanging Ina Mo (Last na 'To!)	Brother Bruno Velasco		
2013	Ang Huling Henya	Man at the Bus		
2020	Love Lockdown	Dennis	Also director	

==== Television ====
Year	Title	Role	Notes	Ref.
1998	Maalaala Mo Kaya: Steps			
1999	Maalaala Mo Kaya: Wristwatch			
2000–2001	Saan Ka Man Naroroon	Hazel		
2002	Maalaala Mo Kaya: Lubid			
2003	Maalaala Mo Kaya: Paper Dolls			
2006	Maalaala Mo Kaya: Pansit	Jon		
2006	Your Song	Sunshine		
2021	My Sunset Girl	Present Day Police 1		

==== Theater ====
Year	Production	Role	Location	Ref.
2007	Dogeaters	First Lady of the Philippines	Carlos P. Romulo Auditorium, RCBC Plaza	
2016	The Dressing Room	Actress B	Wilfrido Ma. Guerrero Theater	
2019	Angels in America: Millennium Approaches	Belize	Carlos P. Romulo Auditorium, RCBC Plaza	
2023	Hukay	Noel	CCP Black Box Theater	
2025	13th of September	Mary Girard	Mondial du Théâtre, Monaco	
2025	Presidential Suite #2	Constantino	CCP Black Box Theater	
2026	About Us But Not About Us	Marcus	Power Mac Center Spotlight Blackbox Theater	

== Awards and nominations ==
Organization	Year	Work	Category	Result	Ref.
FAMAS Award	2016	Para sa Hopeless Romantic	Best Director	Nominated	
PMPC Star Awards for Movies	2015	Trophy Wife	Movie Director of the Year	Nominated	
PMPC Star Awards for Movies	2022	Love Lockdown	Movie Director of the Year	Nominated	
PMPC Star Awards for Movies	2022	Love Lockdown	Movie Cinematographer of the Year	Nominated	
