= Miggs Cuaderno =

Filipino actor and host (born 2004)

- Born: Jose Miguel Banis Chua; August 8, 2004 (age 22); Manila, Philippines
- Occupations: Actor; model
- Years active: 2009–present
- Agents: Sparkle (2009–2024; 2025–present); Regal (2022–present)
- Relatives: Julia Chua (sister)

Jose Miguel Banis Chua (born August 8, 2004), known professionally as Miggs Cuaderno (Tagalog: [miɡs kwaˈdɛɾno]), is a Filipino actor, model, and television host. He is known for his roles in GMA Network television series such as Munting Heredera (2011-2012), Second Chances (2015), and Poor Señorita (2016), and for hosting the educational children's program Tropang Potchi (2009-2015).

Cuaderno's accolades include Best Actor at the Chéries-Chéris Film Festival in France for the film Quick Change (2013), a FAMAS award, and the Balanghai Trophy for Best Supporting Actor at the 10th Cinemalaya Independent Film Festival, among others.

== Early life ==
Jose Miguel Banis Chua was born on August 8, 2004. He is of Chinese descent. At the age of five, he was discovered by director Maryo J. Delos Reyes while performing a bit role in a PETA stage production. He began acting in 2010, at the age of six, gaining public recognition for his role in the television series Munting Heredera, which was directed by Delos Reyes, whom he considered his mentor. To accommodate his work as a child actor, Cuaderno transitioned to online schooling. He completed his grade school education in 2016 at Victory Christian International School.

== Career ==
Cuaderno began his showbiz career at the age of five, becoming one of the hosts of the award-winning children’s program Tropang Potchi. He and his co-hosts received the Best Children’s Show Host award at the 27th and 28th PMPC Star Awards for Television, as well as at the 5th Golden Screen TV Awards. He gained national attention in 2011 for his role as Ton Ton in the GMA Network drama Munting Heredera, which marked his acting debut in a major television series.

In 2013, he starred in Quick Change, for which he received the Best Actor award at the Chéries-Chéris Film Festival. Cuaderno was also honored with the Ani ng Dangal award.

In 2014, Cuaderno appeared in the Cinemalaya entry Children’s Show as young boxer Al, earning widespread acclaim for his performance. He became the first child actor to win the Balanghai Trophy for Best Supporting Actor at the 10th Cinemalaya Independent Film Festival. Cuaderno also appeared in another Cinemalaya entry, Asintado, playing the character Etok, a boy with autism. For this role, he received the Best Child Performer at the 63rd FAMAS Awards and was named Movie Child Performer of the Year at the 31st PMPC Star Awards for Movies. He was the recipient of the Best Child Performer award at the 1st ALTA Media Icon Awards and was also honored as PinakaPASADONG Likhang Bata (Best Child Performer) at the 17th Gawad Pasado.

In 2022, Cuaderno signed an exclusive contract with Regal Entertainment.

== Filmography ==
=== Film ===
Year	Title	Role	Notes	Ref.
2011	Sali-salita	Josh	Main Role; short film	
2012	Ang Katiwala	Budoy	Supporting Role; as "Migs Cuaderno"	
2013	Turning Cradle Alfredo S. Lim Story	Young Alfredo Lim	Credited as "Migs Cuaderno"	
2013	Bamboo Flowers	Bingo	Nominated—30th PMPC Star Awards for Movies for Movie Child Performer of the Year	
2013	Purok 7	Julian	Entry for the 9th Cinemalaya Independent Film Festival	
2013	Quick Change	Hiro	Won—20th Chéries-Chéris Film Festival for Best Actor	
2014	Asintado	Etok	Entry for the 10th Cinemalaya Independent Film Festival	
2014	Children's Show	Al	Entry for the 10th Cinemalaya Independent Film Festival	
2014	Eat Bulaga Lenten Special: Karugtong ng Puso	Ben	Supporting Role	
2015	Child Haus	Louie Ignacio	Main Role	
2015	Maria Labo	Pablo Dela Cruz	Credited as "Miggz Cuaderno"	
2016	Lila	Linda’s Brother/House Kid	Entry for the 2nd Sinag Maynila Independent Film Festival	
2017	Si Tokhang At Ang Tropang Buang			
2017	Ang Guro Kong 'Di Marunong Magbasa	Basil	Entry for the 13th Cinemalaya Independent Film Festival	
2019	OFW: The Movie	Toty		
2020	In the Name of the Mother	Arvin		
2020	Magikland	Boy Bakunawa	Entry for the 46th Metro Manila Film Festival	
2021	Black Superman	Mickey	Short film	
2021	Deception	Eric/Thomas	Main Role	
2023	Shake, Rattle & Roll Extreme	Patrick	Segment: "Glitch"	
2025	Untold	Spike		

=== Television ===
Year	Title	Role	Notes	Ref.
2010	Little Star	Niño		
2011–2012	Munting Heredera	Tonton	Credited as "Migs Cuaderno"	
2012	Faithfully	Miggy Quillamor	Credited as "Migs Cuaderno"	
2013	Tropang Potchi	Himself		
2013	With a Smile	Budot	Credited as "Migs Cuaderno"	
2014	My BFF	Red Catacutan	Credited as "Migs Cuaderno"	
2014	Kambal Sirena	Young Jun		
2015	Destiny Rose	young Joselito " Joey" Vergara Jr.		
2015	My Mother's Secret	Mac		
2015	Second Chances	Benjie		
2016	Tsuperhero	Bokutox / Bok		
2016	Poor Señorita	Apol		
2016	Yo-Kai Watch	Keita	Voice role (Filipino dub)	
2017	Hay, Bahay!	Valentin	Season 1, Episode 31	
2018	Kambal, Karibal	James		
2019–2022	Prima Donnas	Coco	Recurring Role	
2020	Unlocked: Neo & Omar	Neo		
2021	Agimat ng Agila	Bidoy		
2022	Nakarehas na Puso	Young Ramiro "Miro" Jesus Galang		
2022–2023	Mano Po Legacy: The Flower Sisters	James Petersen Chua Tan	Supporting Role	
2023	Daddy's Gurl	Coco	Episode 162	
2024	ASAP Natin 'To	Himself / Performer		
2024	Pamilya Sagrado	Macky Turiano		
2026	Born to Shine	Baste / Basha		

=== Anthologies ===
Year	Title	Role	Notes	Ref.
2012	Magpakailanman	Makmak	Episode 7: The Miriam Castillo Story	
2013	Magpakailanman	Jason	Episode 41: Sa Kabila ng Hirap: The Garrido Family Story	
2014	Magpakailanman	Alvin	Episode 59: Persia: Asong Kanal	
2014	Magpakailanman	Young Rolly	Episode 85: Habang Buhay Na Maghihintay: The Elvira Bolo Story	
2014	Magpakailanman	Gerald	Episode 98: Henyo ng Bangketa: The Gerald Tamayo Story	
2015	Magpakailanman	Angelo	Episode 105: Pasan Ko, Kapatid Ko	
2015	Magpakailanman	Jake	Episode 119: Inang Yaya: The Nieves Limpin Story	
2015	Magpakailanman	Paul Oliver	Episode 139: Ang Batang Isinilang sa Bilangguan: The Paul Oliver Pili Story	
2016	Magpakailanman	Makmak	Episode 178: The Abused Boy	
2017	Magpakailanman	Jack Jack	Episode 204: Ang Batang Binihag ng Kulto	
2017	Wagas	Reniel	Episode 182: Ang Bisita	
2017	Wagas		Episode 210: Mata	
2017	Tadhana	Marko	Episode 4: Dream House	
2017	Daig Kayo ng Lola Ko	Hans	Episode 11: Hans, Gretchen, and the Witch	
2018	Daig Kayo ng Lola Ko	Happy	Episode 52: Snow White and the Seven Dwarfs	
2019	Tadhana	Miguel	Episode 93: Bangkay	
2020	Wish Ko Lang!	Lucas	Nilapa ng Buwaya	
2022	Regal Studio Presents	Jerome	Season 2, Episode 10: Yaya Terror	
2022	Magpakailanman	Junjun	Episode 408: My Father's Killer	
2022	Daig Kayo ng Lola Ko	Potpot	Episode 184-185: Mommyficent	
2022	Regal Studio Presents	Felix	Season 3, Episode 10: My Special Outing	
2022	Regal Studio Presents	Kenneth	Season 6, Episode 2: I Have Two Moms	
2023	Regal Studio Presents	Jansen	Season 7, Episode 6: The Two Nerds	
2023	Regal Studio Presents	Happy	Season 9, Episode 6: My Fake Family	
2024	Regal Studio Presents	Patrick	Season 11, Episode 9: Soulmate	

== Accolades ==
Awards and NominationsAwards and nominations received by Miggs Cuaderno
Award	Year	Category	Nominated work	Result	Ref.
ALTA Media Icon Awards	2015	Best Child Performer	Asintado	Won	
Anak TV Awards	2015	Best Children Program Host	Tropang Potchi	Won	
20th Chéries Chéris	2014	Best Actor	Quick Change	Won	
Cinemalaya Independent Film Festival	2014	Best Supporting Actor	Child Haus	Won	
FAMAS Award	2015	Best Child Performer	Asintado	Won	
Gawad Genio Awards	2015	Best Film Child Performer	Asintado	Won	
17th Gawad Pasado	2015	PinakaPASADONG Likhang Bata (Best Child Performer)	Asintado	Won	
Golden Screen TV Awards	2015	Best Children Show Host	Tropang Potchi	Won	
7th International Filmmaker Festival of World Cinema	2014	Best Supporting Actor	Purok 7	Nominated	
PMPC Star Awards for Movies	2014	Movie Child Performer of the Year	Bamboo Flowers	Nominated	
PMPC Star Awards for Movies	2015	Movie Child Performer of the Year	Asintado	Won	
PMPC Star Awards for Movies	2018	Movie Supporting Actor of the Year	Ang Guro Kong 'Di Marunong Magbasa	Nominated	
PMPC Star Awards for Television	2013	Best Children Show Host	Tropang Potchi	Won	
PMPC Star Awards for Television	2014	Best Children Show Host	Tropang Potchi	Won	
PMPC Star Awards for Television	2015	Best Children Show Host	Tropang Potchi	Nominated	
PMPC Star Awards for Television	2016	Best Child Performer	Poor Señorita	Nominated	

=== Honors and state recognition ===
Organization	Year	Award/Honor	Recipient	Result	Ref.
Inquirer Indie Bravo!	2014	Best Child Performer	Quick Change	Honored	
National Commission for Culture and the Arts	2015	Ani ng Dangal – Cinema	Himself	Honored	
