= 2014 Cinemalaya =

Cinemalaya X
- Festival official poster
- Opening film: Documented by Jose Antonio Vargas
- Closing film: A Thief, a Kid and a Killer by Nathan Adolfson
- Location: Metro Manila, Philippines
- Film titles: 25
- Festival date: August 1–10, 2014
- Website: Official Website

Cinemalaya chronology
- 2015 2013

The 10th Cinemalaya Independent Film Festival, also billed as Cinemalaya X was held from August 1–10 of 2014 in Metro Manila, Philippines. The achievements of Cinemalaya over the past ten years are summed up in the festival's theme: A Decade of Connecting Dimensions. The theme highlights Cinemalaya as a flourishing network of individuals, groups and institutions with a common goal of developing and promoting Filipino independent filmmaking.

Previously held annually in July, the Cinemalaya moved its scheduling to August to avoid competition from "big Hollywood films".

The festival was opened by Jose Antonio Vargas' Documented, a documentary film that chronicles his life living in America and his struggles as an undocumented immigrant. While the closing film was A Thief, a Kid and a Killer, a crime-drama film directed by American director Nathan Adolfson, starring Epi Quizon and Felix Roco.

At the awards ceremony held at the Cultural Center of the Philippines Tanghalang Nicanor Abelardo on August 10; both Bwaya and Kasal won four awards each. Their awards included Best Film and Best Cinematography in their respective categories.

== Entries ==
The fifteen feature-film entries are divided into two separate competitions. The five feature-film entries will compete under the Directors Showcase which are presented by veteran film directors of the country. While the other ten feature-film entries will compete under the New Breed section which are presented by first-time or young filmmakers working today. The Short Film section has also ten competing entries. The winning film is highlighted with boldface and a dagger.

=== Directors Showcase ===
Title	Director	Cast	Genre
Asintado	Louie Ignacio	Aiko Melendez, Gabby Eigenmann, Rochelle Pangilinan, Jake Vargas, and Miggs Cuaderno	Drama, Thriller
Hari ng Tondo	Carlos Siguion-Reyna	Robert Arevalo, Cris Villonco, Rafa Siguion-Reyna, Aiza Seguerra, and Eric Quizon, and Ali Sotto	Comedy drama
Hustisya	Joel Lamangan	Nora Aunor, Rocco Nacino, Rosanna Roces, Sunshine Dizon, Romnick Sarmenta, Chynna Ortaleza, Gardo Versoza, Sue Prado, Jeric Gonzales, and Chanel LaTorre	Drama, Political thriller
The Janitor	Mike Tuviera	Dennis Trillo, Derek Ramsay, Richard Gomez, LJ Reyes, Ricky Davao, Irma Adlawan, Raymond Bagatsing, Alex Medina, Jerald Napoles, and Nicco Manalo	Action, Thriller
**Kasal** ^{†}	Joselito Altarejos	Arnold Reyes, Oliver Aquino, Rita Avila, Sue Prado, and Ron Cieno	Romance

=== New Breed ===
Title	Director	Cast	Genre
1st Ko Si 3rd	Real Florido	Nova Villa, Freddie Webb, Dante Rivero, Charee Pineda, RJ Agustin, and Ruby Ruiz	Romantic comedy
**Bwaya** ^{†}	Francis Xavier Pasion	Angeli Bayani, Karl Medina, and RS Francisco	Drama
Children's Show	Derick Cabrido	Allen Dizon, Gloria Sevilla, Miggs Cuaderno, Buboy Villar, and Nathan Lopez	Drama
Dagitab	Giancarlo Abrahan V	Eula Valdez, Noni Buencamino, and Martin del Rosario	Romantic drama
K'na, The Dreamweaver	Ida Anita del Mundo	Mara Lopez, RK Bagatsing, Alex Medina, Noni Buencamino, and Bembol Roco	Romantic drama
Mariquina	Milo Sogueco	Mylene Dizon, Ricky Davao, Barbie Forteza, Bing Pimentel, Che Ramos, and Dennis Padilla	Drama
Ronda	Nick Olanka	Ai-Ai de las Alas, Julian Trono, Carlo Aquino, Mon Confiado, Carlos Morales and Cogie Domingo	Drama
Separados	GB Sampedro	Erik Santos, Alfred Vargas, Jason Abalos, Ricky Davao, Anjo Yllana, Victor Neri, Ritz Azul, Melissa Mendez, and Patricia Javier	Drama
Sundalong Kanin	Janice O'Hara	Marc Abaya, Art Acuña, Enzo Pineda, Paolo O'Hara, Che Ramos, Ian de Leon, Via Veloso, Isaac Aguirre, Elijah Canlas, Akira Morishita, Angelo Martinez, and Nathaniel Britt	Period drama
#Y	Gino Santos	Elmo Magalona, Coleen Garcia, Sophie Albert, Kit Thompson, Slater Young, and Chynna Ortaleza	Teen drama

=== Short films ===
Title	Director
**Asan si Lolo Me** ^{†}	Sari Estrada
Eyeball	Thop Nazareno
Ina-Tay	Chloe Anna Veloso
Indayog ng Nayatamak	Joris Fernandez
Mga Ligaw na Paru-paro	JE Tiglao
Lola	Kevin Ang
Nakabibinging Katahimikan	Paolo O'Hara
The Ordinary Things We Do	David R. Corpuz
Padulong sa Pinuy-Anan	Fedwelyn Villarba Sabolboro
Tiya Bening	Ralph Aldrin Quijano

== Awards ==
This year's Cinemalaya Independent Film Festival awards night was held Sunday night, August 10, at the Tanghalang Nicanor Abelardo (Main Theater) of the Cultural Center of the Philippines. Under the Director's Showcase category, Joselito Altarejos' Kasal, won the Best Film "for its deeply sensitive and moving depiction of the intricacies of relationships." While Francis Xavier Pasion's Bwaya won the Best Film of the New Breed selection "for its melding of documentary and fictional filmmaking, its effective depiction of a community's efforts to come to grips with the horrible death of a young girl from a crocodile attack, and its powerful evocation of the marshes of Agusan in Mindanao, a vast wilderness where man and beast seek to maintain an ecology of cohabitation."

It is also the first time in Cinemalaya history to give the award of the Gawad Balanghai as a lifetime achievement award. Filipino filmmaker Kidlat Tahimik, dubbed as the "Father of Philippine Independent Cinema", was given the first Gawad Balanghai for he "gave the movement impetus through his pioneering efforts."

=== Full-Length Features ===
Directors Showcase

- Best Film – Kasal by Joselito Altarejos
  - Special Jury Prize – Hari ng Tondo by Carlos Siguion-Reyna
  - Audience Choice Award – Hustisya by Joel Lamangan
- Best Direction – Mike Tuviera for The Janitor
- Best Actor – Robert Arevalo for Hari ng Tondo
- Best Actress – Nora Aunor for Hustisya
- Best Supporting Actor – Nicco Manalo for The Janitor
- Best Supporting Actress – Cris Villonco for Hari ng Tondo
- Best Screenplay – Aloy Adlawan and Mike Tuviera for The Janitor
- Best Cinematography – Mycko David for Kasal
- Best Editing – Tara Illenberger for The Janitor
- Best Sound – The Janitor
- Best Original Music Score – Richard Gonzales for Kasal
- Best Production Design – Harley Alcasid for Kasal

New Breed

- Best Film – Bwaya by Francis Xavier Pasion
  - Special Jury Prize – K'na, the Dreamweaver by Ida Anita del Mundo
  - Audience Choice Award – Sundalong Kanin by Janice O'Hara
- Best Direction – Giancarlo Abrahan for Dagitab
- Best Actor – Dante Rivero for 1st Ko Si 3rd
- Best Actress – Eula Valdes for Dagitab
- Best Supporting Actor – Miggs Cuaderno for Children's Show
- Best Supporting Actress – Barbie Forteza for Mariquina
  - Special Jury Citation for Best Acting Ensemble - The cast of #Y (Sophie Albert, Coleen Garcia, Elmo Magalona, Chynna Ortaleza, and Kit Thompson)
- Best Screenplay – Giancarlo Abrahan for Dagitab
- Best Cinematography – Neil Daza for Bwaya
- Best Editing – Gerone Centeno for Children's Show
- Best Sound – Jonathan Hee and Bryan Dumaguina for Children's Show
- Best Original Music Score – Erwin Fajardo for Bwaya
- Best Production Design – Toym Imao for Kna, the Dreamweaver

Special Awards

- Gawad Balanghai – Kidlat Tahimik
- Canon Best Cinematography of the Festival - Mycko David for "Children's Show"
- NETPAC Award
  - Directors Showcase – Hustisya by Joel Lamangan
  - New Breed – Bwaya by Francis Xavier Pasion

=== Short films ===
- Best Short Film – Asan si Lolo Me by Sari Estrada
  - Special Jury Prize – The Ordinary Things We Do by David Corpuz
  - Audience Choice Award – Lola by Kevin Ang
- Best Direction – Kevin Ang for Lola
- Best Screenplay – Kevin Ang for Lola
