= Someone, Someday =

Philippine romantic thriller television series

- Promotional teaser poster
- Genre: Romantic thriller Romantic drama Romantic comedy Mystery
- Written by: Genesis Rodriguez; Maria Abegail Parayno; Camille Anne dela Cruz; Wilbert Christian Tan; Kristine Marie Gabriel
- Directed by: Chad V. Vidanes; Dolly Dulu; Andoy Ranay
- Starring: Kathryn Bernardo; James Reid; Maja Salvador; Dimples Romana; Rowell Santiago; Rita Avila; McCoy de Leon; Daniela Stranner; Migz Casimiro
- Music by: James Reid; Len Calvo; Adriane Macalipay
- Country of origin: Philippines
- Original language: Filipino
- No. of episodes: 85

Production
- Executive producers: Carlo L. Katigbak; Cory V. Vidanes; Laurenti M. Dyogi; Kylie Manalo-Balagtas; Rondel Lindayag
- Producers: Erick C. Salud; Hazel Bolisay Parfan; Rosselle Soldao-Gannaban; Camille Rosales Navarro
- Cinematography: Yves Jamero; Che Espiritu-Istrael; Marvin Reyes; Mike Jacinto; Mac Cosico
- Editor: Jay Mendoza
- Camera setup: Single-camera
- Running time: 19–44 minutes
- Production companies: ABS-CBN Studios; Dreamscape Entertainment

Original release
- Network: Kapamilya Channel (Note: First released on Netflix and iWant that marketed as "advanced screening". Through its ABS-CBN licensing, it also airs on All TV as well as other affiliate blocktime channels and online platforms via Kapamilya Online Live through Facebook and YouTube. It is also available on-demand via iWant and internationally via The Filipino Channel.)
- Release: July 27, 2026 – present

Someone, Someday is a Philippine romantic thriller television series produced by Dreamscape Entertainment. The story revolves around the chief executive officer (CEO) of a fictional online dating platform that helps women find love at the right time. Directed by Chad V. Vidanes, Dolly Dulu and Andoy Ranay, it stars Kathryn Bernardo, James Reid and Maja Salvador. The series premiered on All TV (through its ABS-CBN licensing) and Kapamilya Channel's Primetime Bida evening block on July 27, 2026.

== Premise ==
When the CEO of a dating app unknowingly befriends someone seeking revenge, old wounds resurface, threatening her company, her family, and her dream of finding romance.

== Cast and characters ==
=== Main cast ===
- Kathryn Bernardo as Benilda "Billy" Cariño Dominguez The CEO of LoveList. A hardworking, tough and independent businesswoman with a moral compass despite her heartbreaking past, she dedicates herself to raising her younger brother and supporting her family and friends.
  - Althea Ruedas as young Billy
- James Reid as Jordan Valentin / Jordan V. Escalante: Billy's childhood best friend. As a reliable and loyal, he is a musician who owns a restobar called Jade & Jude Bar, and also works as a developer and head of technical operations for LoveList.
  - James King as young Jordan
- Maja Salvador as Abigail "Abi" Mercado / Marie Beatrice "Bea" Ferrer: Billy's fanatic and stalker with a hidden agenda. Abi is a desperate and ambitious daughter who takes care of her ill mother while looking for jobs using lies and deception. She turns out to be the older half-sister of Billy and Oliver after Enrico abandoned her family and then Billy's. She is the main antagonist of the series.
- Dimples Romana as Precious "Tita Pres" Amador: Billy and Oliver's loving adoptive mother. Genuine and supportive, Precious is a social welfare worker who serves as a general manager at Angels of Grace Center for Women.
- Rowell Santiago as Enrico Dominguez / Eric: Billy and Oliver's estranged father, who abandoned his family ten years ago. Enrico wants to reconcile with his children despite being wanted for investment fraud in Canada.
- Rita Avila as Mariela Mercado: Abi's mentally unstable mother. She was abandoned by her ex-husband and lost her eldest daughter in a fire that caused a burn scar to her head.
- McCoy de Leon as Carlos "Caloy" Toledo: A criminal who is a street gangster and online hacker. Caloy is Abi's accomplice who has been in love with her.
- Daniela Stranner as Valerie "Val" Jones: A popular social media influencer and Jordan's ex-girlfriend who works as an honorary consultant for LoveList.
- Migz Casimiro as Oliver Cariño: Billy's younger brother who has type 1 diabetes. Oliver is an intelligent and brave student at his school.

=== Supporting cast ===
- Leo Rialp as Jude Valentin: Jordan's grandfather who has Alzheimer's disease.
- Kat Galang as Antonia "Toni" Prieto: A chief financial officer (CFO) for LoveList and Yani's girlfriend.
- Matt Evans as Yani Noceda: Toni's boyfriend who is a struggling painter.
- Mary Joy Apostol as Charm Torres: A design and marketing head for LoveList and Ralph's girlfriend.
- Miggy Jimenez as Ralph Rosales: Charm's wealthy boyfriend.
- Gela Atayde as Marjorie "Marj" Quinto: A social media manager for LoveList.
- Nicco Manalo as Roberto "Robbie" Jacinto: A waiter at Jade & Jude Bar.
- Verna Joy Periwinkle as Blaire Espiritu: An office secretary for LoveList.
- Bong Gonzales as Rainier "Rain" Delgado: A gay waiter at Jade & Jude Bar.

=== Guest cast ===
- Iza Calzado as Olive Cariño: Billy's mother and Enrico's ex-wife, who died in the hospital after giving birth to Oliver. She appears in flashbacks.
- Karylle as Abigail Dominguez: Abi's older sister and Mariela's daughter, who died after saving her mother in the fire. She appears in flashbacks.
- Maricar Reyes as Jade Valentin: Jordan's mother and Jude's daughter, who was found dead on the road by her family. She appears in flashbacks.
- JC de Vera as Alvin Ramirez: Billy's ex-fiancé who cheated on her.
- Arci Muñoz as Gia: Alvin's wife.
- Jas Dudley-Scales as a caller for LoveList.
- Bryan Chong as himself: A guest singer at Jade & Jude Bar.
- Olive Isidro Cruz as Lydia: Precious' co-worker at Angels of Grace.
- Marnie Lapus as Lucy: A canteen manager at Oliver's school.
- Maritess Joaquin as Lindsay: A business investor.
- Lotlot Bustamante as Teresa: A street landlady who is renting Abi's computer shop.
- Zach Castañeda as Kevin: A high-fashion influencer and Valerie's new boyfriend.
- Alexa Ilacad as Camille Cordova: The CEO of Pebblng and Billy's academic rival.
- PJ Endrinal as Morrie: An employee of Pebblng who later joins LoveList.
- Michael Flores as Brandon: A boxing coach and fitness instructor whom Precious met through the LoveList app.
- Ara Davao as Melissa: A caller for LoveList, who has second thoughts about her upcoming wedding.
- Race Matias as Theo: A cook who is engaged to Melissa.
- Joyce Ann Burton as Thalia: The owner of a luxury jewelry brand.
- Ryan Eigenmann as Dino Escalante: Jordan's estranged father and Jade's abusive ex-husband.
- Aya Fernandez as Karen
- Jake Ejercito as Kristoff
- Rafael Rosell as Peter
- Marvin Yap

== Episodes ==
| No. | Title | TV title | Original release date |
|---|---|---|---|
| 1 | "Lovelist" | Beginning | July 27, 2026 |
Scarred by heartbreak, CEO Billy creates LoveList, a dating app to help women find love. But behind her success, a jealous woman has her in her sights.
| 2 | "The Fan" | Conflict | July 28, 2026 |
Billy feels guilty after Valerie's proposal puts Jordan in an awkward spot. At a women's shelter, she meets a fan who may be hiding a dark obsession.
| 3 | "Old Flame" | Resurfaced | July 29, 2026 |
As Billy searches for an investor to launch LoveList's new feature, a man from her past resurfaces — and a scandalous video threatens to derail it all.
| 4 | "Digging Deep" | Suspect | July 30, 2026 |
Jordan tracks down the hacker who targeted LoveList, but the pursuit could have serious consequences. Billy and Precious get a surprise dinner guest.
| 5 | "Friend or Foe" | Stalker | July 31, 2026 |
Valerie joins the LoveList team, hoping to make peace with Jordan. Meanwhile, Billy receives an unexpected call from Abi.
| 6 | "Missing Pieces" | Missing | August 3, 2026 |
Suspicions mount when several of Billy's belongings mysteriously vanish. Jordan and his friends dig into Caloy's background after he is released on bail.
| 7 | "One Step Closer" | Bullied | August 4, 2026 |
Jordan gets one step closer to uncovering the person responsible for the attacks on Billy. Meanwhile, Abi sneaks into LoveList's headquarters.
| 8 | "The False Admirer" | Trouble | August 5, 2026 |
Billy handles to Oliver's troubles at school and then rushes to help Jordan, who's in a tight spot following an encounter with Caloy.
| 9 | "A Ghost from the Past" | Innocent | August 6, 2026 |
Someone from Billy's past shows up unexpectedly, further disrupting her life. Meanwhile, Valerie contends with secrets and accusations.
| 10 | "A Father's Plea" | Hiding | August 7, 2026 |
Billy confronts her bitter past, just as Jordan's visit to his grandfather stirs up painful memories of his own. Abi tries to hide her link to Caloy.
| 11 | "Estranged" | Employment | August 10, 2026 |
When Jordan’s LoveList team needs to expand, Billy pursues a promising candidate. Meanwhile, Enrico gets a job at Oliver’s school.
| 12 | "Cracks in the Story" | Rejection | August 11, 2026 |
Billy unwittingly stokes Abi’s animosity toward her, while Caloy gives Jordan another thread to follow, and Enrico grows closer to Oliver.
| 13 | "Layers of Deceit" | Fraud | August 12, 2026 |
Abi spirals after losing her computer shop. Billy believes her father doesn’t deserve her forgiveness after she discovers another of his indiscretions.
| 14 | "Betrayal in Bloom" | Scheme | August 13, 2026 |
A major deal for LoveList falls through after Abi conspires with the company’s biggest rival, leaving Billy and her team reeling.
| 15 | "Claiming Credit" | Stolen | August 14, 2026 |
As Abi passes off stolen plans as her original idea, Jordan helps Billy process everything that’s unfolded since Abi’s arrival.
| 16 | "Karma is a B*tch" | Riot | August 17, 2026 |
Precious meets her LoveList match while accompanying Oliver to a boxing class, and Abi uses the stolen files to build her LoveFeast project with Pebblng.
| 17 | "Hard Choices" | Revealed | August 18, 2026 |
Pebbing celebrates a big victory as the LoveList team struggles to develop a new campaign, and Enrico scrambles to protect his secret.
| 18 | "The Next Move" | Connivance | August 19, 2026 |
The LoveList team develops a new project to get the company back on track, while Caloy attempts to destroy some incriminating evidence.
| 19 | "Ctrl + Delete" | Exposed | August 20, 2026 |
Caloy's attempt to hide his connection to Abi goes disastrously wrong. Later, Billy discovers that someone isn't who they claim to be.
| 20 | "Loose Ends" | Detained | August 21, 2026 |
Precious and Enrico have a long-overdue talk, where he learns the consequences of leaving his family. Billy finally gets a chance to demand answers.
| 21 | "Happily Ever After" | Success | August 24, 2026 |
Billy leads the wedding of Happily Ever After’s first clients and helps Jordan with a reconciliation. Bea suffers a setback with her own event.
| 22 | "The Bait" | Deceived | August 25, 2026 |
Bea walks right into Billy and Jordan’s trap — with shattering consequences. Later, Caloy receives an unwelcome visitor at the hospital.
| 23 | "A Song for You" | Gift | August 26, 2026 |
Driven by revenge, Bea goes undercover to help Caloy escape, while Billy and Jordan celebrate their birthdays together — and share a moment.
| 24 | "Break In" | Invader | August 27, 2026 |
Caloy breaks into Billy’s house to vandalize it, and the situation becomes violent when she catches him. Later, Jordan battles painful memories.
| 25 | "Delayed Justice" | Investigation | August 28, 2026 |
Following the confrontation with Caloy, Billy fears for her family’s safety and takes action. When the police confront Bea, she denies any involvement.
| 26 | "Bad Blood" | Envy | August 31, 2026 |
Bea’s inability to find another job makes her more bitter, while Jordan grows increasingly frustrated that Billy’s attackers continue roaming free.
| 27 | "Danger Zone" | Danger | September 1, 2026 |
Billy comforts Precious after her romance ends. Jordan digs up troubling details about Mariela’s past — just as she takes matters into her own hands.
| 28 | "Watch Your Back" | Discovery | September 2, 2026 |
Bea promises Mariela that she’ll make their enemies pay. Meanwhile, Jordan and Billy’s investigation unearths more perplexing secrets.
| 29 | "Mad Fake" | Plot | September 3, 2026 |
Enrico learns about the danger surrounding Billy. Bea and Caloy stage a robbery to help her get a job at a luxury jewelry brand that works with LoveList.
| 30 | "One Step Ahead" | Trap | September 4, 2026 |
Unaware that a trap awaits them, Bea and Caloy put their next plan into motion. Meanwhile, Charm and Ralph accidentally reveal their romantic struggles.
| 31 | "A Twist of Fate" | Backfire | September 7, 2026 |
As Billy celebrates becoming Entrepreneur of the Year alongside Jordan and the LoveList team, Bea betrays Caloy during police questioning.
| 32 | "A Debt to Pay" | Uncover | September 8, 2026 |
An unexpected phone call propels Billy to do an unthinkable favor for her father, while Jordan discovers that Bea continues to evade justice.
| 33 | "A Lie to Protect Her" | Unfazed | September 9, 2026 |
Hoping to clear Bea’s name, Caloy denies her involvement in his crimes while she tries to soothe Mariela’s concerns. Jordan continues to investigate.
| 34 | "An Unwanted Encounter" | Clash | September 10, 2026 |
Tensions flare when Billy and Mariela meet face to face, and Ralph boldly stands up to his mother after she criticizes his life choices.
| 35 | "Hidden Feelings" | Torn | September 11, 2026 |
A misunderstanding has Jordan fearful that Billy’s heart belongs to someone else. Meanwhile, Precious gets caught up in her feelings.
| 36 | "Confession" | Preparation | September 14, 2026 |
Billy and Jordan plan a special birthday celebration for Precious. Later, Enrico tries to reveal his truth to Precious, but it goes horribly awry.
| 37 | "Catching Feelings" | Revelation | September 15, 2026 |
Jordan makes a tough decision about his feelings. Billy gets a shock at the surprise party when she meets the man Precious has been dating.
| 38 | "Coming Clean" | Truth | September 16, 2026 |
In the wake of the fiasco at the party, Billy and Precious make amends — and Oliver finally learns the truth. Meanwhile, Bea spots a familiar face.
| 39 | "The Connection" | Connection | September 17, 2026 |
Desperate to mend her relationship with Oliver, Billy reaches out to Jordan for help. Caloy has an unexpected encounter in prison.
| 40 | "Missing" | Uncover | September 18, 2026 |
The root of Bea’s overpowering obsession with Billy and her success becomes clear. Later, Jordan panics when his grandfather vanishes.
| 41 | "To Love is to Sacrifice" | Realization | September 21, 2026 |
As Jude and Billy share a heartfelt moment, Jordan frantically searches for his grandfather. Later, Oliver sneaks out of the house to find Enrico.
| 42 | "Through The Storm" | Reconnect | September 22, 2026 |
Mariela rages when she learns Bea's been keeping secrets. Billy decides that Oliver's happiness is more important that her own pain.
| 43 | "Red-Handed" | Reset | September 23, 2026 |
Enrico resolves to make amends. Billy’s decisions stun and impress Jordan. Mariela bombards Precious with baffling information.
| 44 | "Past Due" | Reignite | September 24, 2026 |
Bea vows payback when she worries that her mother might hurt herself again. Meanwhile, Enrico strives to clear the air when Precious and Oliver visit.
| 45 | "Trauma Loop" | Renewal | September 25, 2026 |
Oliver and Enrico catch up on lost time. Billy signs an exciting new deal for LoveList. Bea hatches a fresh plan to destroy her enemies.
| 46 | "Seduced" | Sabotage | September 28, 2026 |
Valerie unexpectedly helps Jordan navigate his feelings for Billy amid LoveList's celebrations, and Bea tries to seduce the company's investor.
| 47 | "Deadline" | Blackmail | September 29, 2026 |
Hoping to protect her brother, Billy tells Enrico he won't be able to see Enrico for much longer. Bea turns on Peter to steal LoveLine's private data.
| 48 | "Wrong Timing" | Hold On | September 30, 2026 |
Unaware of Peter's entanglement with Bea, Billy and Jordan reach out to him for answers. Mariela boldly confronts Precious to settle the score.
| 49 | "Ravaged" | Shattered | October 1, 2026 |
Precious and Mariela's confrontation ignites devastating consequences. Enrico and Jordan step up in the midst of danger to ensure everyone's safety.
| 50 | "Unsent" | Unspoken | October 2, 2026 |
In the wake of disaster, Billy seeks comfort from Jordan and discovers unsent letters from her father. Bea seeks an escape for herself and her mother.
| 51 | "The Visit" | Face Off | October 5, 2026 |
Billy struggles to balance the pressures of her personal and professional lives. Bea seeks out Enrico — but finds the last person she wants to see.
| 52 | "The Pursuit" | Cornered | October 6, 2026 |
Billy and Jordan investigate a hunch on the LoveLine hack, while Bea and Mariela's attempt to skip the country meets a panic-inducing obstacle.
| 53 | "Healing Begins" | Healing | October 7, 2026 |
Bea and Mariela's worst fears become a reality. Meanwhile, Billy cares for Enrico, and their fractured relationship begins to mend.
| 54 | "Price of the Past" | Forgiveness | October 8, 2026 |
After Billy forgives him, Enrico plans to tell his daughter the truth. Bea finds a possible way out of trouble for her mother. Billy returns to LoveList.
| 55 | "Something Unsaid" | Hidden | October 9, 2026 |
Jordan confesses a secret that he's kept from Billy. Caloy asks to join Dino's clique — and claims he knows about his plans to escape prison.
| 56 | "Tough Times" | Feelings | October 12, 2026 |
After finally getting his mother's support, Ralph takes a big step. While Bea and Billy butt heads over Mariela, Enrico wrestles with the truth.
| 57 | "A Truth Long Buried" | Viral | October 13, 2026 |
As Enrico continues to struggle with hiding his past, Precious grows suspicious. Bea realizes that her family secrets could be a path to freedom.
| 58 | "Blood Sisters" | Sisters | October 14, 2026 |
Billy reaches her breaking point during a LoveList meeting. Later, she agrees to meet with Bea. and Enrico finally tells Precious everything.
| 59 | "A Way Out" | Consequence | October 15, 2026 |
Following a tense confrontation, Billy learns about her father's deteriorating health — and his secrets. In prison, Caloy and Dino stir up trouble.
| 60 | "On Shaky Ground" | Blame | October 16, 2026 |
Billy and Enrico visit Bea and Mariela in prison. Elsewhere, Caloy and Dino plan their next move, and the LoveList team tries to recover.
| 61 | "A Familiar Voice" | Plea | October 19, 2026 |
While Billy wrestles with Enrico's unthinkable request, Dino tracks down Jordan following his viral video — and Caloy pursues a wicked plan.
| 62 | "A Father to the Rescue" | Hope | October 20, 2026 |
Determined to make amends with his son, Dino warns Caloy to back off. Meanwhile, Jordan defends Billy and her attempts to repair LoveList.
| 63 | "Forgiven" | Decline | October 21, 2026 |
As her personal hardships continue spiraling, Billy struggles to hold together a crumbling LoveList. Bea and Mariela's cases take an unexpected turn.
| 64 | "Unexpected Reunion" | Violence | October 22, 2026 |
Old wounds and unresolved emotions resurface when Dino comes to his son's aid. Upon learning of Caloy's escape, Jordan fears for Billy's safety.
| 65 | "Two Fathers" | Retaliate | October 23, 2026 |
Dino offers Jordan proof that he has changed by helping him find Caloy. They have a suspenseful confrontation. Meanwhile, Billy and Enrico visit Bea.
| 66 | "The Other Daughter" | Painful | October 26, 2026 |
Struggling to process Dino's return, Jordan turns to his grandfather. As Enrico asks Bea's forgiveness, Oliver questions Billy about their family.
| 67 | "The Other Sister" | Other Sister | October 27, 2026 |
Billy takes Oliver to the hospital to introduce him to their half-sister. When Bea tries to visit Caloy in prison, she is met with an unwelcome surprise.
| 68 | "Old Allies New Plan" | Dangerous Allies | October 28, 2026 |
When Bea and Caloy reconnect, their old schemes threaten her new life — and Jordan finally comes clean to Billy about his recent encounters.
| 69 | "Appeal for Sympathy" | Sympathy | October 29, 2026 |
Bea tries to use her mother's condition to garner sympathy, but Billy doesn't buy it. Dino keeps trying to win Jordan back and reconnect.
| 70 | "From Enemies to Lovers?" | Unspoken Love | October 30, 2026 |
Jordan faces difficult truths about his father, and Billy comforts him — stirring buried feelings that bring deeper emotions to the surface.
| 71 | "I'm Sorry, I Love You" | Rejected | November 2, 2026 |
Billy grapples with the weight of Jordan’s confession and the fear of ruining their friendship. Enrico tries to work things out while visiting Mariela.
| 72 | "Payback" | Burst | November 3, 2026 |
Mariela lashes out when she sees Enrico with Precious, and Bea encounters a new hurdle in earning her family’s trust after discovering her mother’s fate.
| 73 | "A Wolf in Sheep's Clothing" | Caught | November 4, 2026 |
Bea teams up with a familiar face to plan her mother’s escape. As Enrico juggles his warring daughters, Billy resolves to get even with the Mercados.
| 74 | "Crossfire" | Caloy | November 5, 2026 |
Gunfire erupts during a prison break — with deadly consequences. Disappointed in her father, a distraught Billy lashes out at Enrico for picking sides.
| 75 | "Turning Point" | Awakening | November 6, 2026 |
Bea experiences a change of heart that infuriates Mariela. Meanwhile, Billy’s growing resentment and mounting pressures push her to a breaking point.
| 76 | "The Threat Within" | Terror | November 9, 2026 |
As a vengeful Mariela ventures down a destructive path, Bea tries to reason with her. Billy must relive her trauma when tragedy befalls a relative.
| 77 | "The Price of Trust" | Wounded | November 10, 2026 |
Billy lashes out at Bea for everything that’s happened to her family. Mariela seeks forgiveness when she faces consequences for her actions.
| 78 | "Hardened by Anger" | Career | November 11, 2026 |
Enrico tries to set things right with Mariela and Precious. Meanwhile, Jordan’s music career flourishes as Dino longs to reconnect with him.
| 79 | "Spiraling Out of Control" | Backlash | November 12, 2026 |
Reeling from a shocking revelation, Billy continues juggling cascading problems as her growing frustration spills over into her relationships.
| 80 | "The House Divided" | Fractured | November 13, 2026 |
Billy hits her breaking point, and Jordan tries reasoning with her. Meanwhile, Karen recalls an alarming memory that could change everything.
| 81 | "Darker Days" | Paranoia | November 16, 2026 |
When Billy faces a shocking accusation — and blackmail — her paranoia and unpredictability threaten to alienate everyone closest to her.
| 82 | "Weight of the Guilt" | Burdened | November 17, 2026 |
As her blackmailer escalates, Billy breaks down and confesses to Jordan — tormented by the possibility she’s the culprit he’s been searching for.
| 83 | "A Way to Heal" | Young Billy | November 18, 2026 |
Billy confronts her past self in a dream and finds peace. Jordan, refusing to believe Billy is guilty, corners Bea — and spots a clue pointing to Karen.
| 84 | "The Turning Point" | Conspiracy | November 19, 2026 |
Billy tries to make amends with her LoveList team after its tireless efforts to keep the company running without her. Later, Bea seeks forgiveness.
| 85 | "Dangerous Alliance" | Manipulation | November 20, 2026 |
As Bea forms an alliance to take down her rival, Billy and Jordan survey Dino and Karen’s hideout, uncovering fresh evidence in the blackmail plot.

== Production ==
=== Development and casting ===
On August 29, 2025, Kathryn Bernardo and James Reid have been cast to an untitled series from Dreamscape Entertainment which was considered an unexpected casting. This will be Reid's comeback series in 8 years since his last series with ex-girlfriend Nadine Lustre, Till I Met You. On September 5, 2025, Maja Salvador have been cast to the series marking her comeback to ABS-CBN since The Killer Bride in 2019. On November 14, 2025, after the release of the Christmas Station ID 2025: Love, Joy, Hope: Sabay Tayo Ngayong Pasko, the title was revealed together with additional cast appearances. It was revealed that the title was Someone, Someday and the cast who appeared on the video were Rowell Santiago, Dimples Romana, Rita Avila, Matt Evans, Gela Atayde, McCoy de Leon, Daniela Stranner, Nicco Manalo, Kat Galang, and Bong Gonzales. Additional cast added were Ryan Eigenmann and Jake Ejercito.

Dolly Dulu was also announced to direct the series.

=== Filming ===
Principal photography has commenced on November 17, 2025, with Chad Vidanes as director.

== Marketing ==
ABS-CBN released a special poster teaser of the series on June 26, 2026.

On July 1, 2026, ABS-CBN Entertainment released the official teaser of the series on its YouTube channel. The teaser introduces Bernardo's character as a caring sister, a young CEO who is portrayed as kind to her colleagues, and a devoted childhood friend to Reid's character, while also highlighting her more tougher side through scenes depicting her engaging in a physical confrontation. More of Bernardo and Reid's moments were revealed, while Maja Salvador's intriguing character was shown. On July 8, 2026, the official trailer has been released on YouTube.

On July 23, 2026, the launching of 4 licensed merchandise for the series has been announced and will be on sale starting July 27, 2026 with pre-orders before that date.

== Music ==
During the Next on Netflix Philippines event on February 9, 2026, it has been announced that James Reid will write the theme song for the series. The song "Traffic" will be part of the soundtrack of the series. The official soundtracks of the series have been announced on July 11, 2026 during the Someone, Someday Press Play: An Exclusive Fan Music Hangout. The first of the soundtrack is the acoustic rendition of "Kulimlim" by Angela Ken, followed by "Tabla Tayo" by Fana. The third soundtrack would be the original song of Bryan Chong titled "Sugal". The fourth soundtrack is another rendition of the song "Mag-Isa Lang Ako", followed by Maki's "Abelyana". And lastly James Reid's "Pauwi Na" and "Sandal" are part included on the soundtrack.

== Release ==
The series was released first on Netflix on July 24, 2026, three days before its television premiere on ALLTV2 (through its ABS-CBN licensing), Kapamilya Channel, A2Z, and TV5 on July 27. The series consists of 90 episodes.
