= List of Second Chances episodes =

Second Chances is a 2015 Philippine television drama romantic series broadcast by GMA Network. It premiered on the network's Telebabad line up from January 12, 2015 to May 8, 2015, replacing Hiram na Alaala.

Mega Manila ratings are provided by AGB Nielsen Philippines.

== Series overview ==
Month	Episodes	Monthly Averages
Month	Episodes	Mega Manila
January 2015	15	17.0%
February 2015	20	17.8%
March 2015	22	19.2%
April 2015	20	19.9%
May 2015	6	18.3%
Total	83	18.4%

== Episodes ==
=== January 2015 ===
Episode		Original air date	Social Media Hashtag	AGB Nielsen Mega Manila Households in Television Homes			Ref.
Episode		Original air date	Social Media Hashtag	Rating	Timeslot Rank	Primetime Rank	Ref.
1	Pilot	January 12, 2015	#SecondChances	18.6%	#1	#6	
2	Lyra Mourns	January 13, 2015	#SCLyraMourns	18.4%	#1	#6	
3	Lyra Meets Bernard	January 14, 2015	#SCLyraMeetsBernard	18.3%	#1	#6	
4	Lyra Helps Billy	January 15, 2015	#SCLyraHelpsBilly	17.5%	#1	#8	
5	Broken Hearts	January 16, 2015	#SCBrokenHearts	13.7%	#2	#8	
6	Rebecca's Secret	January 19, 2015	#SCRebeccasSecret	17.1%	#2	#7	
7	A Mother's Pain	January 20, 2015	#SCAMothersPain	17.0%	#1	#8	
8	Lyra Comforts Rebecca	January 21, 2015	#SCLyraComfortsRebecca	15.0%	#1	#8	
9	Finding Billy	January 22, 2015	#SCFindingBilly	17.3%	#2	#8	
10	New Friendships	January 23, 2015	#SCNewFriendships	16.3%	#2	#8	
11	Lyra in Danger	January 26, 2015	#SCLyraInDanger	15.7%	#2	#9	
12	Jerome Suspects	January 27, 2015	#SCJeromeSuspects	17.9%	#1	#6	
13	Lyra Meets Colleen	January 28, 2015	#SCLyraMeetsColleen	17.4%	#1	#7	
14	Shocking Truth	January 29, 2015	#SCShockingTruth	17.8%	#1	#6	
15	Bernard vs. Jerome	January 30, 2015	#SCBernardVsJerome	16.6%	#2	#7	

=== February 2015 ===
Episode		Original air date	Social Media Hashtag	AGB Nielsen Mega Manila Households in Television Homes			Ref.
Episode		Original air date	Social Media Hashtag	Rating	Timeslot Rank	Primetime Rank	Ref.
16	Fight for Lyra	February 2, 2015	#SCFightForLyra	17.5%	#1	#6	
17	To Love Again	February 3, 2015	#SCToLoveAgain	16.3%	#2	#7	
18	Lyra Moves On	February 4, 2015	#SCLyraMovesOn	16.6%	#1	#6	
19	The Proposal	February 5, 2015	#SCTheProposal	17.1%	#1	#6	
20	Fateful Day	February 6, 2015	#SCFatefulDay	17.6%	#1	#6	
21	The Truth About Billy	February 9, 2015	#SCTheTruthAboutBilly	16.6%	#1	#7	
22	The Big Revelation	February 10, 2015	#SCTheBigRevelation	19.3%	#1	#5	
23	Painful Truth	February 11, 2015	#SCPainfulTruth	18.5%	#1	#6	
24	Confronting the Truth	February 12, 2015	#SCConfrontingTheTruth	19.6%	#1	#6	
25	Rebecca in Pain	February 13, 2015	#SCRebeccaInPain	17.4%	#2	#7	
26	Truth Revealed	February 16, 2015	#SCTruthRevealed	17.7%	#1	#7	
27	The Search for Billy	February 17, 2015	#SCTheSearchForBilly	17.0%	#2	#7	
28	Lyra Takes a Stand	February 18, 2015	#SCLyraTakesAStand	19.9%	#1	#3	
29	Billy's DNA Test	February 19, 2015	#SCBillysDNATest	18.2%	#2	#8	
30	Rebecca vs. Bernard	February 20, 2015	#SCRebeccaVsBernard	17.6%	#2	#7	
31	Lyra's Fate	February 23, 2015	#SCLyrasFate	18.6%	#1	#5	
32	Billy's Custody	February 24, 2015	#SCBillysCustody	18.4%	#1	#7	
33	Begging for Love	February 25, 2015	#SCBeggingForLove	17.9%	#2	#6	
34	Rejection	February 26, 2015	#SCRejection	16.6%	#2	#8	
35	The Right Thing	February 27, 2015	#SCTheRightThing	16.7%	#2	#8	

=== March 2015 ===
Episode		Original air date	Social Media Hashtag	AGB Nielsen Mega Manila Households in Television Homes			Ref.
Episode		Original air date	Social Media Hashtag	Rating	Timeslot Rank	Primetime Rank	Ref.
36	Parting Time	March 2, 2015	#SCPartingTime	17.9%	#2	#7	
37	A New Chapter	March 3, 2015	#SCANewChapter	18.7%	#1	#4	
38	New Beginnings	March 4, 2015	#SCNewBeginnings	18.4%	#1	#4	
39	The Date	March 5, 2015	#SCTheDate	18.2%	#1	#6	
40	Chance Meeting	March 6, 2015	#SCChanceMeeting	16.8%	#2	#7	
41	Separate Lives	March 9, 2015	#SCSeparateLives	18.7%	#1	#6	
42	Letting Go	March 10, 2015	#SCLettingGo	19.0%	#2	#7	
43	Saving Billy	March 11, 2015	#SCSavingBilly	19.3%	#1	#7	
44	Heavy Hearts	March 12, 2015	#SCHeavyHearts	18.8%	#2	#8	
45	Disturbed Rebecca	March 13, 2015	#SCDisturbedRebecca	17.5%	#2	#7	
46	A Mother's Struggle	March 16, 2015	#SCAMothersStruggle	19.7%	#1	#6	
47	Lyra's Decision	March 17, 2015	#SCLyrasDecision	17.2%	#2	#7	
48	Lyra's Suspicion	March 18, 2015	#SCLyrasSuspicion	18.1%	#2	#8	
49	Seeking Justice	March 19, 2015	#SCSeekingJustice	20.9%	#1	#4	
50	Billy's Welfare	March 20, 2015	#SCBillysWelfare	21.0%	#1	#3	
51	The Escape	March 23, 2015	#SCTheEscape	20.0%	#1	#7	
52	The Revelation	March 24, 2015	#SCTheRevelation	20.1%	#1	#7	
53	Secrets Revealed	March 25, 2015	#SCSecretsRevealed	19.4%	#1	#7	
54	Hurting Hearts	March 26, 2015	#SCHurtingHearts	19.6%	#1	#5	
55	Confrontations	March 27, 2015	#SCConfrontations	20.8%	#1	#4	
56	Rebecca vs. Colleen	March 30, 2015	#SCRebeccaVsColleen	21.0%	#1	#5	
57	Tragic Day	March 31, 2015	#SCTragicDay	22.0%	#1	#2	

=== April 2015 ===
Episode		Original air date	Social Media Hashtag	AGB Nielsen Mega Manila Households in Television Homes			Ref.
Episode		Original air date	Social Media Hashtag	Rating	Timeslot Rank	Primetime Rank	Ref.
58	The Fateful Meeting	April 1, 2015	#SCTheFatefulMeeting	21.3%	#1	#2	
59	The Runaways	April 6, 2015	#SCTheRunaways	21.2%	#1	#2	
60	Painful Punishment	April 7, 2015	#SCPainfulPunishment	21.1%	#1	#2	
61	Acceptance	April 8, 2015	#SCAcceptance	19.5%	#1	#5	
62	The Confirmation	April 9, 2015	#SCTheConfirmation	20.0%	#1	#2	
63	Friend or Foe?	April 10, 2015	#SCFriendOrFoe	20.2%	#1	#1	
64	Moving On	April 13, 2015	#SCMovingOn	22.0%	#1	#4	
65	Doubts and Truths	April 14, 2015	#SCDoubtsAndTruths	21.4%	#1	#5	
66	Jerome's Past	April 15, 2015	#SCJeromesPast	20.5%	#1	#2	
67	The Confession	April 16, 2015	#SCTheConfession	18.5%	#1	#5	
68	Reasonable Doubts	April 17, 2015	#SCReasonableDoubts	19.3%	#1	#5	
69	Shocking Revelations	April 20, 2015	#SCShockingRevelations	18.9%	#1	#6	
70	No Way Out	April 21, 2015	#SCNoWayOut	19.4%	#1	#6	
71	The Face Off	April 22, 2015	#SCTheFaceOff	18.9%	#1	#5	
72	Unanswered Questions	April 23, 2015	#SCUnansweredQuestions	21.3%	#1	#4	
73	Discovering the Truth	April 24, 2015	#SCDiscoveringTheTruth	21.6%	#1	#2	
74	The Real Killer	April 27, 2015	#SCTheRealKiller	20.2%	#1	#4	
75	Painful Goodbye	April 28, 2015	#SCPainfulGoodbye	19.7%	#1	#4	
76	Unspoken Words	April 29, 2015	#SCUnspokenWords	14.6%	#1	#8	
77	Rebecca is Back	April 30, 2015	#SCRebeccaIsBack	18.5%	#1	#6	

=== May 2015 ===
Episode		Original air date	Social Media Hashtag	AGB Nielsen Mega Manila Households in Television Homes			Ref.
Episode		Original air date	Social Media Hashtag	Rating	Timeslot Rank	Primetime Rank	Ref.
78	Rebecca's Revenge	May 1, 2015	#SCRebeccasRevenge	19.5%	#1	#3	
79	Justice is Served	May 4, 2015	#SCJusticeIsServed	17.8%	#1	#6	
80	Love Finds a Way	May 5, 2015	#SCLoveFindsAWay	18.2%	#1	#6	
81	Lyra Accepts Jerome	May 6, 2015	#SCLyraAcceptsJerome	17.3%	#1	#6	
82	Rebecca vs. Lyra	May 7, 2015	#SCRebeccaVsLyra	19.2%	#1	#4	
83	Much Deserved Second Chance	May 8, 2015	#SCMuchDeservedSecondChance	18.0%	#1	#6	
