= Second Chances (Philippine TV series) =

2015 Philippine television drama series

- Title card
- Also known as: Another Chance
- Genre: Romantic drama
- Created by: R.J. Nuevas
- Written by: Lobert Villela; Rona Lean Sales; Des Garbes-Severino
- Directed by: Laurice Guillen
- Creative director: Roy C. Iglesias
- Starring: Raymart Santiago; Camille Prats; Rafael Rosell; Jennylyn Mercado
- Theme music composer: Pearisha Abubakar
- Opening theme: "Second Chance" by Jennylyn Mercado
- Country of origin: Philippines
- Original language: Tagalog
- No. of episodes: 83 (list of episodes)

Production
- Executive producer: Carolyn B. Galve
- Production locations: Quezon City, Philippines
- Editors: Lara Theresa D.V. Linsangan; Jesus "Bot" Tana; Jaybe Maquiran
- Camera setup: Multiple-camera setup
- Running time: 23–30 minutes
- Production company: GMA Entertainment TV

Original release
- Network: GMA Network
- Release: January 12 – May 8, 2015

Second Chances (international title: Another Chance) is a 2015 Philippine television drama romance series broadcast by GMA Network. Directed by Laurice Guillen, it stars Raymart Santiago, Camille Prats, Rafael Rosell and Jennylyn Mercado. It premiered on January 12, 2015, on the network's Telebabad line up. The series concluded on May 8, 2015, with a total of 83 episodes.

The series is streaming online on YouTube.

== Premise ==
The story revolves around Lyra, Bernard, Rebecca and Jerome. When Lyra meets Bernard who both lost their spouse, their lives start to intertwine with each other along with Jerome and Rebecca who suffers from bipolar disorder.

== Cast and characters ==
Cast

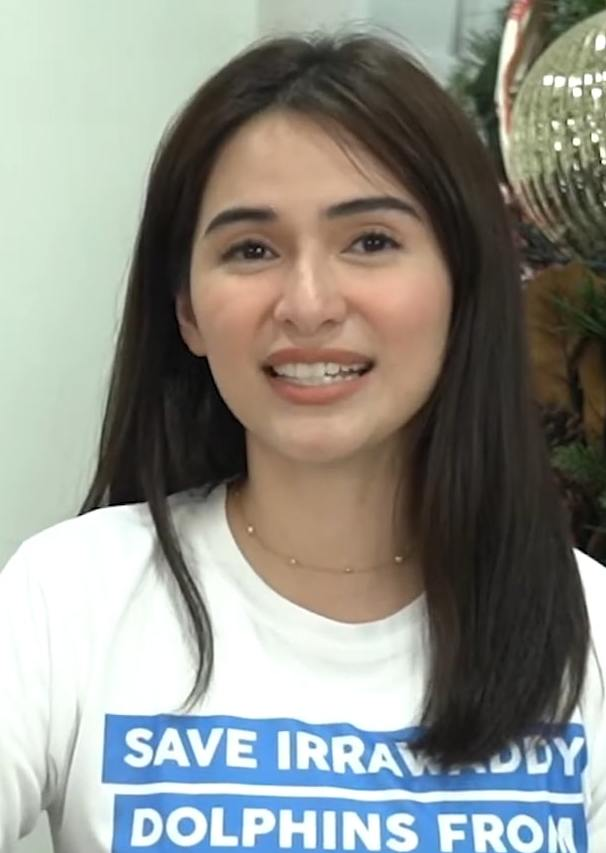
Jennylyn Mercado

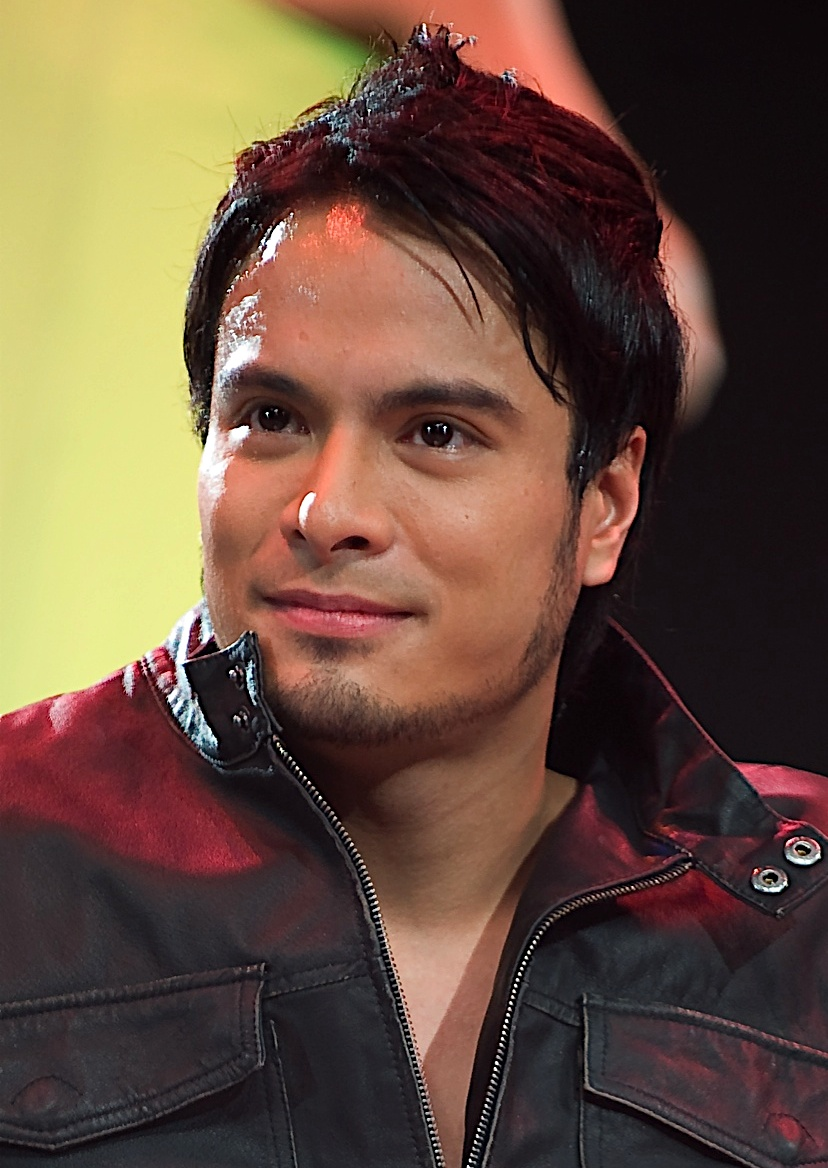
Rafael Rosell

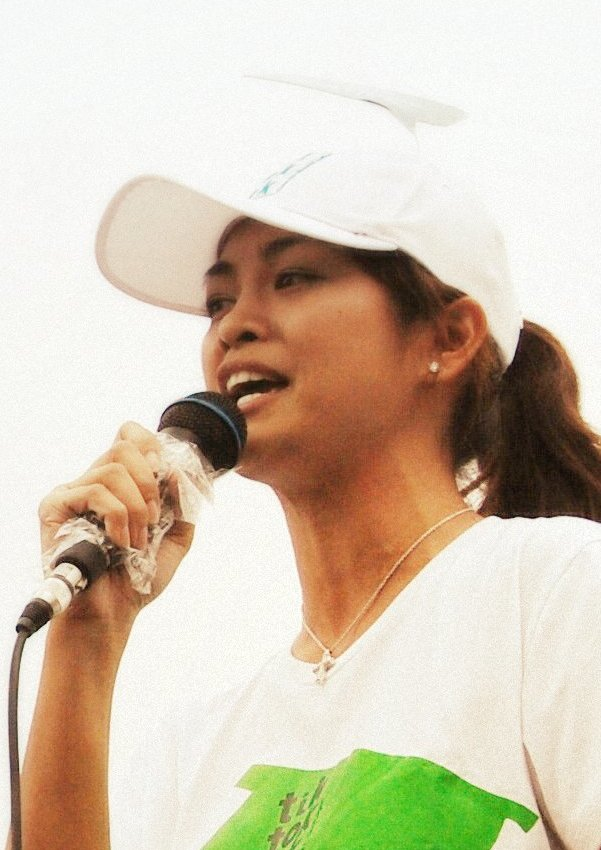
Miriam Quiambao

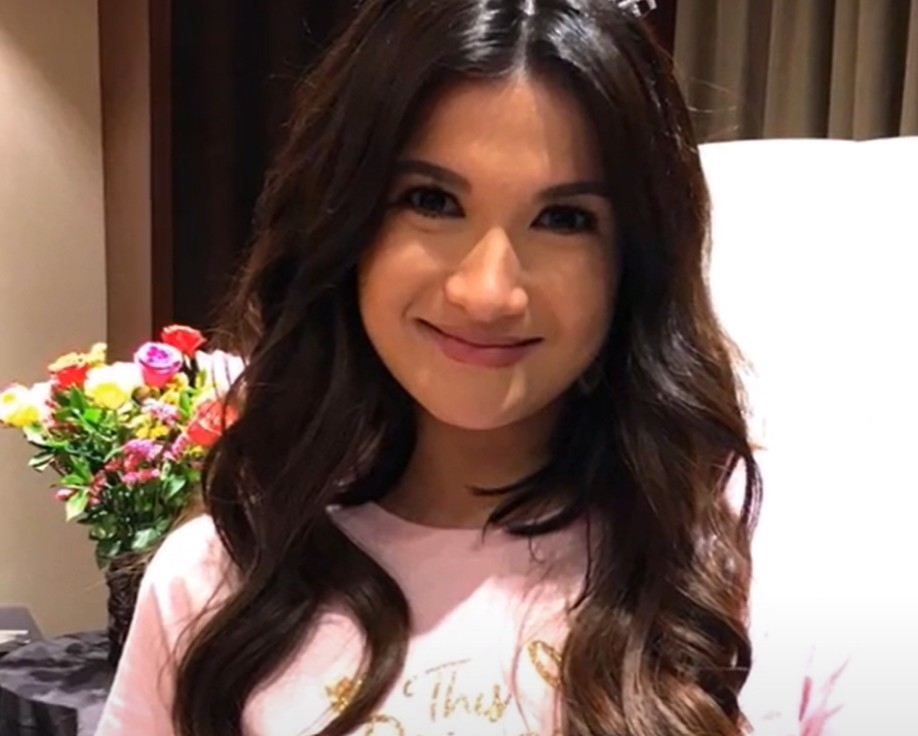
Camille Prats

Lead cast

- Raymart Santiago as Bernard Castello
- Camille Prats as Rebecca "Reb / Becky" Villacorta
- Rafael Rosell as Jerome Padilla / Michael
- Jennylyn Mercado as Lyra Bermudez-Padilla

Supporting cast

- Chynna Ortaleza as Colleen Paredes
- Roi Vinzon as Federico Villacorta
- Miriam Quiambao as Alyssa
- Frencheska Farr as Penelope "Penny" Ampil
- Gerard Pizarras as Jonas Rodrigo
- Miggs Cuaderno as Benjie
- Joshen Bernardo as Billy Castello / Daryl Villacorta
- Ayen Munji-Laurel as Norma Padilla
- Glenda Garcia as Carmen Bermudez
- Ricky Davao as Benito Bermudez

Guest cast

- Luis Alandy as Albert Bermudez
- Joshua Uy as Marky Bermudez
- Ryza Cenon as Mariel
- Jackie Rice as Denise Paredes-Castello
- Diva Montelaba as Sam
- Frances Makil-Ignacio as Consuelo Timeo
- Jaime Fabregas as an attorney
- Mel Kimura
- Kier Legaspi as Larry
- Nina Ricci Alagao as Chona
- Marc Abaya as Dustin
- Arianne Bautista as April Villacorta

== Ratings ==
According to AGB Nielsen Philippines' Mega Manila household television ratings, the pilot episode of Second Chances earned an 18.6% rating. The final episode scored an 18% rating.
