= Quick Change (2013 film) =

2013 film

- Directed by: Eduardo Roy Jr.
- Written by: Eduardo Roy Jr.
- Starring: Mimi Juareza; Miggs Cuaderno
- Release date: 27 July 2013
- Running time: 82 minutes
- Country: Philippines
- Language: Tagalog

Quick Change is a 2013 Philippine drama film directed by Eduardo Roy Jr. The film was screened in the Panorama section of the 64th Berlin International Film Festival.

== Synopsis ==
A story of suffering, acceptance, and hope, the film follows Dorina, a middle-aged trans woman, as she navigates the complexities of the world in search of her place.

== Cast ==
- Mimi Juareza as Dorina Pineda
- Miggs Cuaderno as Hiro
- Jun Jun Quintana as Uno
- Francine Garcia as Hazel
- Natashia Yumi as Lavinia
- Filipe Martinez as Mamu
- Rolando Inocencio
- Sashi Giggle as Trixie
