= Soliman Cruz =

Filipino actor

- Born: September 14, 1963 (age 63)
- Occupation: Actor
- Years active: 1980s–present

Soliman Cruz is a Filipino actor.

== Early life and education ==
Cruz was born on September 14, 1963. He has been into theater since fifth grade and an attendee of the Kasaysayan ng Lahi Summer Arts Workshop at Nayong Pilipino.

Dulaang Sibol director Onofre R. Pagsanghan scouted Cruz in a workshop theater workshop in Camp Claudio, Parañaque. Pagsanghan endorsed Cruz's enrollment to the Philippine High School for the Arts in Los Baños, Laguna. He did not enter college.

== Career ==
After graduating from high school, Cruz joined the Cultural Center of the Philippines' Bulwagang Gantimpala in the 1980s and impressed theater director Tony Espejo. He was cast in roles suitable for his "intense, macho acting". He initially started with supporting roles but was given lead roles such as a Vietnamese refugee in Bienvenido Noriega's "Takas". Cruz is also noted for directing children's plays. His contemporaries included Pen Medina.

Cruz's first short film was the 8mm Kwentong Barbero in 1991 of director Jon Red. He had a break when he portrayed the father of the gay protagonist in the 2005 film, The Blossoming of Maximo Oliveros. He then appeared in the 2006 Metro Manila Film Festival film Kasal, Kasali, Kasalo. He also acted in independent films such as Manila Skies (2009) and Norte (2013). He often appears in supporting roles for works of Filipino director Lav Diaz.

Cruz had a hiatus in his career due to suffering from drug dependency. He went back to acting in 2017.

He has also appeared in supporting roles in television such as Ang Probinsyano or Pepito Manaloto.

In 2021, Cruz was filming for Spre Nord (To The North) of director Mihai Mincan. The Romanian film tackles themes of addiction which parallels with Cruz's own personal life. He got a role due to Mincan being a fan of Diaz's works.

== Personal life ==
Cruz had two daughters with actress Roence Santos. In total he has three biological children and a stepdaughter.

Cruz became dependent on illegal drugs with him wandering in the streets near Manila Bay becoming viral. He featured in a December 2012 episode of Kapuso Mo, Jessica Soho where he was evaluated by psychiatrist-psychologist Randy Dellosa who diagnosed him with methamphetamine addiction with possible schizophrenia. Alternatively he is reported to use cocaine.

He eventually volunteered himself to undergo drug rehabilitation in 2015. He was treated in several places, including in Taguig, Bulacan and Cavite. He recovered by 2018.

== Filmography ==
=== Film ===
| Year | Title | Role | Notes |
|---|---|---|---|
| 2005 | The Blossoming of Maximo Oliveros | Paco Oliveros | |
| 2006 | Kasal, Kasali, Kasalo | Rommell Mariano | Supporting role, Official Metro Manila Film Festival 2006 entry |
| 2013 | Norte, the End of History | Wakwak | |
| 2021 | On the Job: The Missing 8 | Obet | |
| 2022 | Blue Room | Officer Delgado | |
| 2022 | To the North | Joel | |
| 2022 | Selina's Gold | Berong | |
| 2022 | Katok | Mang Delfin | |
| 2023 | Suki | D.O.M. | |
| 2023 | Five Breakups and a Romance | Roger | Supporting role |
| 2023 | Family of Two | Roger | Supporting role, Official Metro Manila Film Festival 2023 entry |
| 2024 | The Kingdom | Lolo Kip | Supporting role, Official Metro Manila Film Festival 2024 entry |
| 2025 | Ex Ex Lovers | Mr. C | |
| 2025 | In Thy Name | Rey Rubio | |
| 2025 | First Light | Father Claridad | |
| 2025 | Only We Know | Judge Manolo "Ling" Soriano | Supporting role |
| 2025 | Out of Order | Atty. Nicholas Maximo | Supporting role |
| 2025 | The Time That Remains | Tesesing | Supporting role |
| 2025 | The Delivery Rider | Ben Marquez | Supporting role |
| 2025 | Manila's Finest | Stella Javier | Supporting role, Official 2025 Metro Manila Film Festival entry |

=== Television ===
| Year | Title | Role | Notes |
|---|---|---|---|
| 2021–2022 | La Vida Lena | Diosdado "Dado" Mendoza | Guest role |
| 2026 | Sigabo | NCIA Director Fernando Delgado | Supporting role |
