= 31st PMPC Star Awards for Movies =

2014 Philippine Movie Press Club awards

31st Star Awards for Movies
- Date: March 8, 2015
- Site: The Theater, Soliare Hotel, Parañaque City
- Hosted by: Kim Chiu; Iza Calzado; Xian Lim; Pops Fernandez

Highlights
- Best Picture: Bonifacio: Ang Unang Pangulo; The Janitor (Indie)

The 31st PMPC Star Awards for Movies by the Philippine Movie Press Club (PMPC), honored the best Filipino films of 2014. The ceremony took place on March 8, 2015, in The Theater, Soliare Hotel in Parañaque City.

The PMPC Star Awards for Movies was hosted by Kim Chiu, Xian Lim, Iza Calzado, Pops Fernandez and Robi Domingo as segment host. Bonifacio: Ang Unang Pangulo won the Movie of the Year and Movie Director of the Year, while The Janitor won the Indie Movie of the Year and Indie Movie Director of the Year.

== Winners and nominees ==
The following are the nominations for the 31st PMPC Star Awards for Movies, covering films released in 2014.

Winners are listed first and indicated in bold.

=== Major categories ===
Movie of the Year	Indie Movie of the Year
Winner: **Bonifacio: Ang Unang Pangulo** / Philippians Productions & Entertainment Inc., Tuko Film Productions, Buchi Boy Films, and RCP Productions: English Only, Please / Quantum Films, MJM Productions Inc., Artikulo Uno, Tuko Film Productions; Starting Over Again / Star Cinema; The Gifted / Viva Films and Multi Vision Films; The Trial / Star Cinema TROPHY WIFE / Viva Films and MVP Entertainment	Winner: ''**The Janitor''** / APT Entertainment, Inc. and Cinemalaya Foundation: 1st Ko Si 3Rd / Fire Starters Manila Productions Company and Cinemalaya Foundation; Dementia / The IdeaFirst Company, Octobertrain Films, and TV5; Hari Ng Tondo / Reynafilms, Central Digital Lab, Star Cinema, and Cinemalaya Foundation; Maratabat (Pride And Honor) / Blank Pages Productions; Mga Kuwentong Barbero (Barber's Tales) / Hong Kong-Asia Film Financing Forum, Octobertrain Films, and APT Entertainment, Inc.; Sundalong Kanin / Front Media Entertainment, SQ Film Laboratories, Inc. and Cinemalaya Foundation
Movie Director of the Year	Indie Movie Director of the Year
Winner: **Enzo Williams** - **Bonifacio: Ang Unang Pangulo**: Olivia Lamasan - Starting Over Again; Chris Martinez - The Gifted; Andoy Ranay - Trophy Wife; Chito S. Roño - The Trial; Dan Villegas - English Only, Please	Winner: **Michael Tuviera** - **The Janitor**: Arlyn Dela Cruz - Maratabat (Pride And Honor); Real Florido - 1st Ko Si 3rd; Perci Intalan - Dementia; Jun Robles Lana - Mga Kuwentong Barbero (Barber's Tales); Janice O’Hara - Sundalong Kanin; Carlos Siguion-Reyna - Hari Ng Tondo
Movie Actor of the Year	Movie Actress of the Year
Winner: Tied between **John Lloyd Cruz** - **(The Trial)** and **Piolo Pascual** - **(Starting Over Again)**: Robert Arevalo - (Hari Ng Tondo); John Estrada - (Trophy Wife); Robin Padilla - (Bonifacio: Ang Unang Pangulo); Derek Ramsay - (English Only, Please); Dennis Trillo - (The Janitor)	Winner: **Nora Aunor - (Dementia)**: Anne Curtis - (The Gifted); Eugene Domingo - (Barber's Tales); Cherie Gil - (Mana); Toni Gonzaga - (Starting Over Again); Aiko Melendez - (Asintado); Jennylyn Mercado - (English Only, Please)
Movie Supporting Actor of the Year	Movie Supporting Actress of the Year
Winner: **Nicco Manalo** - **The Janitor**: Marc Abaya - Sundalong Kanin; Vincent De Jesus - The Trial; Gabby Eigenmann - Asintado; Richard Gomez - The Trial; Jess Mendoza - Alienasyon; Jake Vargas - Asintado	Winner: **Gretchen Barretto** - **The Trial** and **Sylvia Sanchez** - **The Trial**: Shamaine Buencamino - Mga Kuwentong Barbero (Barber's Tales); Iza Calzado - Starting Over Again; Jasmine Curtis-Smith - Dementia; Lotlot De Leon - Kubot: The Aswang Chronicles 2; Gladys Reyes - Mga Kuwentong Barbero (Barber's Tales)
New Movie Actor of the Year	New Movie Actress of the Year
Winner:**Richard Yap** - **The Amazing Praybeyt Benjamin**: Nathaniel Britt - Sundalong Kanin; Julian Estrada - Relaks, It's Just Pag-Ibig; Jeric Gonzales - Dementia; Sandino Martin - Esprit De Corps; IÑigo Pascual - Relaks, It's Just Pag-Ibig; James Reid - Diary Ng Panget	Winner: **Sofia Andres** - **Relaks, It's Just Pag-Ibig**: Sophie Albert - #Y; Ritz Azul - Separados; Athena Bautista - Kamkam; Coleen Borgonia - 1st Ko Si 3rd; Loren Burgos - Mulat (Awaken); Coleen Garcia - #Y
Movie Child Performer of the Year
Winner: **Miggs Cuaderno** - **Asintado** and **Bimby Yap** - **The Amazing Praybeyt Benjamin**: Isaac Cain Aguirre - Sundalong Kanin; Elijah Canlas - Sundalong Kanin; Adrian Cabrido - T’yanak; Ryzza Mae Dizon - My Big Bossing; Alonzo Muhlach - My Big Bossing

=== Technical categories ===
Movie Original Screenplay of the Year	Indie Movie Original Screenplay of the Year
Winner: **Ricardo Lee, Enrico Santos, and Kriz Gazmen** - **The Trial**: Antoinette Jadaone - Beauty In A Bottle; Antoinette Jadaone - English Only Please; Chris Martinez - The Gifted; Carmi Raymundo and Olivia Lamasan - Starting Over Again; Enzo Williams, Keiko Aquino, and Carlo Obispo - Bonifacio: Ang Unang Pangulo	Winner: '**Arlyn Dela Cruz** - **Maratabat (Pride And Honor)**: Aloy Adlawan - The Janitor; Renei Dimla - Dementia; Real Florido - 1st Ko Si 3rd; Antoinette Jadaone - That Thing Called Tadhana; Jun Robles Lana - Mga Kuwentong Barbero (Barber's Tales); Bibeth Orteza - Hari Ng Tondo
Movie Cinematographer of the Year	Indie Movie Cinematographer of the Year
Winner: **Carlo Mendoza** - **Bonifacio: Ang Unang Pangulo**: Shing-Fung Cheung - Kubot: The Aswang Chronicles 2; Hermann Claravall - Starting Over Again; Gary Gardoce - The Gifted; Manuel Teehankee - The Trial; Dan Villegas - English Only Please	Winner: **Rain Yamson, II** - **Magkakabaung**: Jay Abello - Hari Ng Tondo; Marissa Floirendo - The Janitor; Mackie Galvez - Dementia; Carlo Mendoza - Mga Kuwentong Barbero (Barber's Tales); Sasha Palomares - That Thing Called Tadhana; Rommel Sales - Maratabat (Pride And Honor)
Movie Production Designer of the Year	Indie Movie Production Designer of the Year
Winner: **Roy Lachica and Joel Bilbao** - **Bonifacio: Ang Unang Pangulo**: Winston Acuyong - The Trial; Whammy Alcazaren - English Only, Please; Angel Diesta - The Gifted; Shari Marie Montiague - Starting Over Again; Ericson Navarro - Kubot: The Aswang Chronicles 2	Winner: **Chito Sumera** - **Mga Kuwentong Barbero (Barber's Tales)**: Gerardo Calagui - Maratabat (Pride And Honor)'; Rolly CariÑo - Hari Ng Tondo; Jeck Cogama and Popo Diaz - 1st Ko Si 3rd; Popo Diaz - Dementia; Roy Lachica - The Janitor; Fiel Zabat - Sundalong Kanin
Movie Editor of the Year	Indie Movie Editor of the Year
Winner: **Benjamin Tolentino** - **Bonifacio: Ang Unang Pangulo**: Vanessa De Leon - The Gifted; Marya Ignacio - English Only Please; Marya Ignacio - Starting Over Again; George Jarlego - Trophy Wife; Carlo Francisco Manatad - The Trial	Winner: **Tara Illenberger** - **The Janitor**: Lawrence Ang - Dementia; Lawrence Ang - Mga Kuwentong Barbero (Barber's Tales); Cyril Bautista - Sundalong Kanin; Manet Dayrit - Hari Ng Tondo; Carlo Francisco Manatad - Maratabat (Pride And Honor); Geoffrey William - Separados
Movie Musical Scorer of the Year	Indie Movie Musical Scorer of the Year
Winner:**Von De Guzman** - **Bonifacio: Ang Unang Pangulo**: Teresa Barrozo - The Gifted; Cesar Francis Concio - Starting Over Again; Cesar Francis Concio - The Trial; Erwin Romulo and Malek Lopez - Kubot: The Aswang Chronicles 2; Emerzon Texon - English Only Please	Winner: **Von De Guzman** - **Dementia**: Teresa Barrozo - Maratabat (Pride And Honor); Ryan Cayabyab - Mga Kuwentong Barbero (Barber's Tales); Richard Gonzales - The Janitor; Jesse Lucas - Alienasyon; TJ Ramos - Sundalong Kanin; Myke Salomon - Hari Ng Tondo
Movie Sound Engineer of the Year	Indie Movie Sound Engineer of the Year
Winner: **Albert Michael Idioma** - **Bonifacio: Ang Unang Pangulo**: Aurel Claro Bilbao - Starting Over Again; Lamberto Casas Jr. and Alex Tomboc - The Gifted; Hit Productions - Kubot: The Aswang Chronicles 2; Addiss Tabong - English Only Please; Addiss Tabong - The Trial	Winner: **Albert Michael Idioma and Alex Tomboc** - **The Janitor**: Albert Michael Idioma - Hari Ng Tondo; Mark Locsin and Warren Santiago - Mga Kuwentong Barbero (Barber's Tales); Drew Millalos - Sundalong Kanin; Addiss Tabong - Dementia; Addiss Tabong - That Thing Called Tadhana; Wildsound - Maratabat (Pride And Honor)
Movie Original Theme Song of the Year	Indie Movie Original Theme Song of the Year
Winner: **“Hindi Pa Tapos”** - **Bonifacio: Ang Unang Pangulo** / Composed and Performed by Gloc 9, Arranged by Paulo Zarate: “Bhala Na” / Talk Back And You're Dead Lyrics by Thyro Alfaro and Yumi Lacsamana, Music by Thyro Alfaro, Interpreted by Nadine Lustre and James Reid; “Bukas Na” / My Big Bossing /Lyrics and Music by Jan Ilacad and Kiko Salazar; Arranged by Kiko Salazar; Interpreted by Nikki Gil; “No Erase” / Diary Ng Panget / Lyrics by Thyro Alfaro and Yumi Lacsamana, Music by Julius James de Belen, Interpreted by Nadine Lustre and James Reid; “Wag Ka Nang Umiyak” / The Trial / Lyrics and Music by Ebe Dancel, Interpreted by KZ Tandingan	Winner: **“Sige Lang Nang Sige”** / Hari Ng Tondo / Lyrics by Bibeth Orteza, Music by Myke Salomon, Interpreted by Aiza Seguerra, Rafa Siguion-Reyna, and Cris Villonco: “Aking Araw” / 1st Ko Si 3rd / Lyrics by Real Florido, Music by Carlo Yanesa, Interpreted by Ken Chan; “Asintado” / Asintado / Composed and Arranged by Gloc 9, Performed by Gloc 9 and Lirah Bermudez; “Batang Tulisan” / Sundalong Kanin / Composed by Jaime Jesus Borlagdan, Arranged by TJ Ramos, Interpreted by Heber O’Hara; “Broken Strings” / Mariquina / Lyrics and Music by Jerrold Tarog, Interpreted by Karen Gaerlan; “Habang Panahon” / Alienasyon / Lyrics by Ricky Gallardo, Music by Jesse Lucas, Interpreted by Jon Abella; “Pangarap Na Ikaw” / Separados / Composed by GB Sampedro and Lara Maigue, Arranged by Marvin Querido, Interpreted by Erik Santos and by Lara Maigue

=== Special awards ===
Darling of the Press

Winner: **Vicky Morales**

- KC Concepcion
- Anne Curtis-Smith
- Luis Manzano
- Robin Padilla
- Judy Ann Santos

- Face of the Night: **Iñigo Pascual and Kylie Padilla**
- Male Star of the Night: **Julian Estrada**
- Female Star of the Night: **Sofia Andres**
- Nora Aunor Ulirang Artista Lifetime Achievement Award - **Celia Rodriguez**
- Ulirang Alagad Ng Pelikula Sa Likod Ng Kamera Lifetime Achievement Award - **Director Maryo J. delos Reyes**
