= 2014 in the Philippines =

- Decades: 1990s; 2000s; 2010s; 2020s
- See also: List of years in the Philippines; films; music; television; sports

2014 in the Philippines details events of note that happened in the Philippines in the year 2014.

== Incumbents ==
Benigno S.
Aquino III

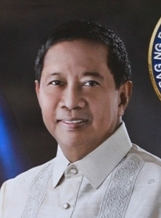
Jejomar C.
Binay, Sr.

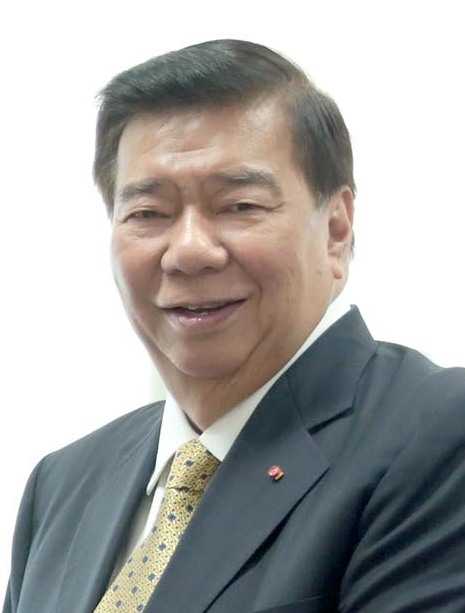
Franklin M.
Drilon

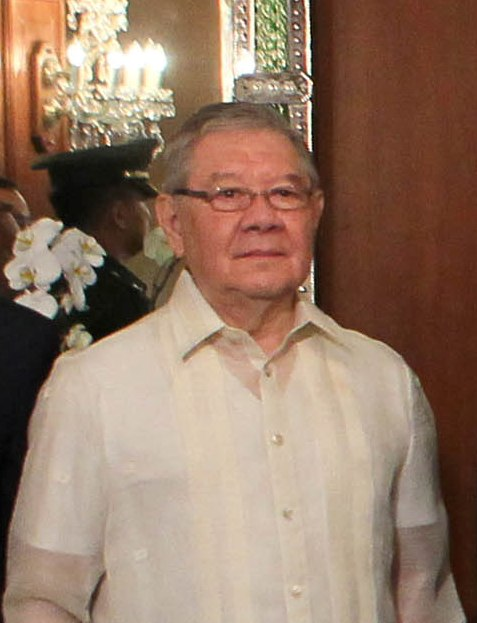
Feliciano R.
Belmonte, Jr.

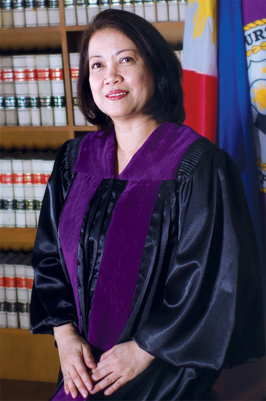
Maria Lourdes
P.A. Sereno

- President – Benigno S. Aquino III (Liberal)
- Vice President – Jejomar C. Binay, Sr. (UNA) (Note: Vice-President Jejomar C. Binay, Sr. was affiliated with PDP–Laban at the time when he was sworn into office. He announced that he left PDP–Laban on March 1, 2014. Since then he became an independent. He was set to announce his new political party on June 12, 2014, but he decided to postpone it due to the current political issues affecting the country.)
- Congress (16th):
  - Senate President – Franklin M. Drilon (Liberal)
  - House Speaker – Feliciano R. Belmonte, Jr. (Liberal)
- Chief Justice – Maria Lourdes P.A. Sereno

== Events ==
=== January ===
- January 10–20 – The low pressure area that was affecting Visayas and Mindanao since January 10 is upgraded into Tropical Depression Agaton by the Philippine Atmospheric, Geophysical and Astronomical Services Administration (PAGASA), becoming the first storm to hit the Philippines in 2014. Prior to Agaton intensified into a tropical depression, it first developed into an area of low pressure and has caused floodings, deaths, and displaced thousand of people in Mindanao since January 10. As of January 30, Agaton has killed at least 68 people with 4 reported missing. It has displaced an estimate of 160,000 people and caused a total damage of 313.78 million pesos to infrastructure and agriculture.
- January 13 – The National Bureau of Investigation (NBI) arrests alleged rice smuggler David Tan, also known as Davidson Tan Bangayan or David Lim.
- January 25 – The government and the Moro Islamic Liberation Front (MILF) have finally sign the fourth and last annex of the Framework Agreement on the Bangsamoro, an agreement between the two parties that calls for the creation of the autonomous political entity named Bangsamoro replacing the Autonomous Region in Muslim Mindanao.
- January 27–February 2 – The Armed Forces of the Philippines (AFP) leads an offensive, codenamed Operation Darkhorse, against the Bangsamoro Islamic Freedom Fighters (BIFF) to arrest various members of the militant group, including its leader Umbra Kato, for various criminal charges. By January 27, the AFP overran a BIFF camp in Shariff Saydona Mustapha, Maguindanao, Mindanao. The clash took place barely after the signing of the Framework Agreement between the government and the MILF. As of January 29, 37 people were killed during the armed conflict, 36 of which are members of the BIFF and 1 soldier from the AFP.
- January 28 – Ten Philippine National Police (PNP) officers are sacked following revelations from the Commission on Human Rights that they play a so-called "wheel of torture" game at a secret detention facility to extract information from criminal suspects and for their own amusement.

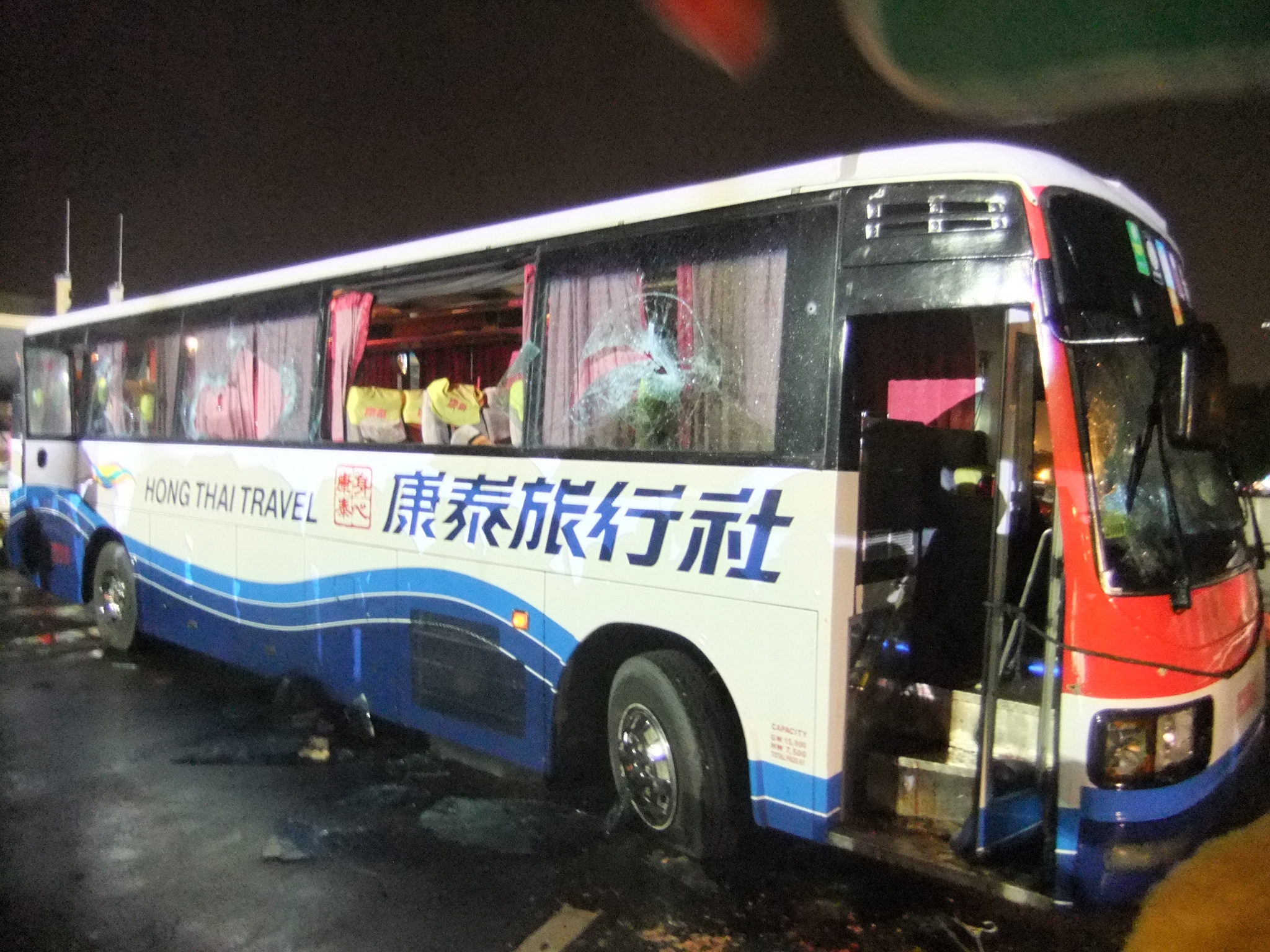
The bus of the 2010 Manila hostage crisis.

- January 29 – The Government of Hong Kong scraps all Philippine diplomatic and official passport holders' 14-day visa free access after the Philippine government failed to issue an apology for the Manila hostage crisis in 2010.

=== February ===
- February 1 – A blast from an improvised explosive device, allegedly planted by members of the BIFF, injures 12 soldiers and civilians in Barangay Lower Salbu, Datu Saudi Ampatuan, Maguindanao.
- February 12 – The government announces that it had recovered the secret Swiss accounts of former President Ferdinand E. Marcos amounting to 1.3 billion pesos after a Singapore court ruled that Philippine National Bank had the legal rights to the accounts. The accounts were already transferred to the National Treasury on February 5.
- February 15 – More than 519,221 members of the Iglesia ni Cristo (INC) join the Worldwide Walk For Those Affected by Typhoon Yolanda held in Manila and in selected sites in the Philippines and abroad as the Worldwide Walk breaks the records of the Guinness Book of World Records for the largest charity walk in a single venue and in the largest charity walk in multiple venues in 24 hours.
- February 18:
  - The Supreme Court of the Philippines (SC) declares the major provisions of the Cybercrime Prevention Act of 2012 (Republic Act 10175) including the online libel provision as constitutional. On the online libel, the court further clarified that only the original authors of libelous material are covered by the law, and not those who received or reacted to it (e.g., liking, sharing, and commenting on an online post). The court also ruled the unconstitutionality of some provisions of the law including unsolicited commercial communications, on collection or recording of traffic data in real-time by means of a computer system, and take-down clause or restricting access to computer data.
  - The House of Representatives starts the public hearings on the proposal to amend the 1987 Constitution to allow the Congress to lift restrictions regarding ownership of land, and business such as public utilities, mass media, educational institutions and advertising by foreigners to bring more foreign investments to the country. On March 3, The House Committee on Constitutional Amendments approved the resolution for the amendment after several public hearings.
- February 21 – The government completes the negotiations with the South Korean aerospace company Korea Aerospace Industries for the purchase of 12 brand new KAI T-50 Golden Eagle (also known as FA-50), a supersonic advanced trainer and multirole light fighter type of jets. The deal is worth 18.9 billion pesos (424.34 million US Dollars). The first batch was to be delivered in September 2015.

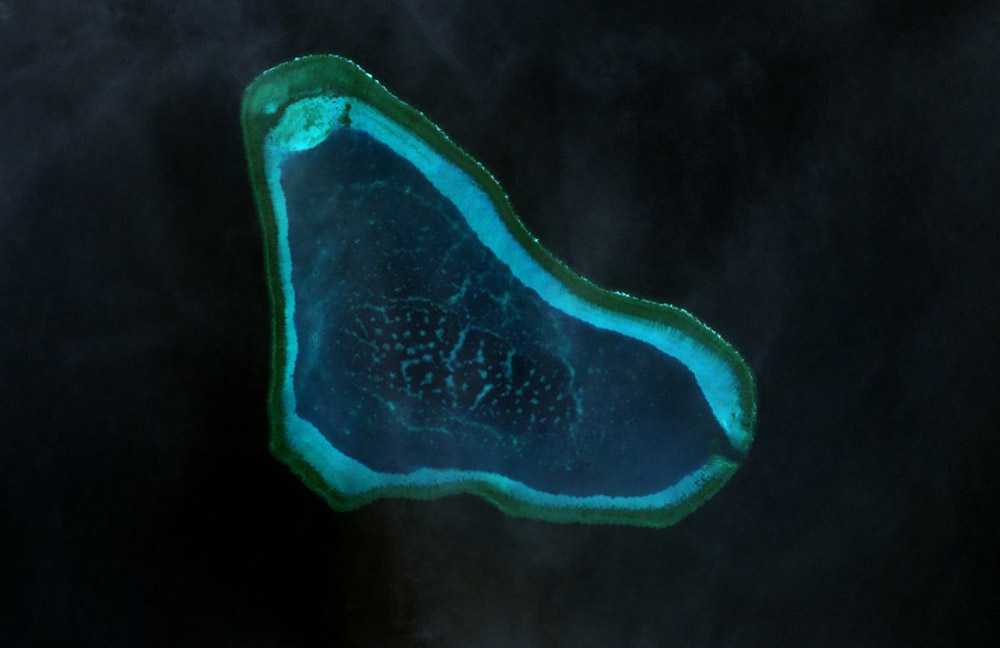
A Landsat 7 image of Panatag Shoal.

- February 24:
  - AFP chief Emmanuel T. Bautista reports an incident to a foreign forum in Manila that Filipino fishermen were driven away from Panatag Shoal (known internationally as Scarborough Shoal), a disputed territory claimed both by the Philippines and China, by a Chinese coast guard vessel using water canons. The incident happened on January 27.
  - Members of Confederation of Truckers Association and Integrated North Harbor Truckers Association stage a mass protest against the implementation of the Truck Ban in the City of Manila by Manila Mayor Joseph Estrada as the ban officially starts.
- February 27 – A massive power breakdown occur in the island of Mindanao affecting 25 million people in several major cities and provinces. The blackout lasted for more than five hours. Several businesses declared profit losses, while local government services were greatly paralyzed due to the blackout. On February 28, the Department of Energy (DOE) announced that the cause of the power interruption was due to line trippings which started in Agus I Hydroelectric Power Plant in Lanao del Norte.

=== March ===
- March 3 – President Aquino III abolishes six government-owned and controlled corporations as part of crackdown of dissolving non-performing, and unnecessary firms in the government.
- March 4 – The Senate concurs the ratification of the country's separate extradition treaties with the United Kingdom, India, and Spain in a vote of 17 with no objections and abstentions. All the extradition treaties will have a retroactive effect, which means, according to Senator Miriam Defensor Santiago, "The treaties are applicable to offenses committed prior to the entry into force of the treaties. This means that we can extradite the plunder criminals if they flee to the UK, Spain, or India, even though the plunder was committed before the effectivity of the extradition treaties." The treaties to the said three countries were ratified by President Aquino III on December 6, 2013.
- March 6 – Delfin Lee, President of Globe Asiatique and one of the country's top five fugitives, is captured outside a hotel in Malate, Manila and was later brought to Camp Crame in Quezon City. Lee faced syndicated estafa charges filed by Department of Justice (DOJ) for the 6.6 billion pesos Globe Asiatique scam in 2009.
- March 8 – Chinese coast guard ships block two Philippine vessels from entering Ayungin Shoal (known internationally as Second Thomas Shoal). On March 11, the Aquino government released an official statement and a diplomatic protest about the incident, through the Department of Foreign Affairs, stating that the Ayungin Shoal is part of the Philippines, and China's act was considered a clear and urgent threat to the rights and interests of the country. Furthermore, the civilian vessels were only conducting rotation of personnel and resupply operations in the said shoal. To resupply the Filipino troops garrisoned in the grounded BRP Sierra Madre in the said shoal, the Philippine Navy decided in providing air drop supplies of food and water to the soldiers. In a text message by Chinese Embassy spokesman Zhang Hua to the media on March 12, she said, "The Chinese side does not accept the protest by the Philippine side."
- March 10:
  - The Senate, on third and final reading, passes Senate Bill no. 1733 or People's Freedom of Information (FOI) Act of 2013 authored by Senator Grace Poe. All 21 senators present voted for the approval of the said bill. Prior to the approval of the bill on the final reading, the bill has been filed 44 times in 7 Congresses.
  - A total of 11 people, including seven soldiers and two policemen, are killed in separate clashes with New People's Army (NPA) rebels in Matanao, Davao del Sur.
- March 17 – Former Philippine Charity Sweepstakes Office (PCSO) board member Jose Taruc V surrenders to the Philippine National Police – Criminal Investigation and Detection Group (PNP–CIDG) in Greenhills, San Juan City. Taruc was one of the accused, together with former president and now Pampanga Representative Gloria Macapagal Arroyo, on the 336 million peso plunder case filed by the Sandiganbayan in 2012 on the misuse of the agency's intelligence funds.
- March 21 – Asia-Pacific Cable Network 2, a submarine cable, is damaged. It caused internet connectivity issues and it affects the Eastern Communications and Philippine Long Distance Telephone Company subscribers. The said problem also affects other nine Asia-Pacific countries.
- March 22 – Communist Party of the Philippines Chairman Benito Tiamzon and wife Wilma Tiamzon, who also sits as the secretary general of the New People's Army (NPA), and 5 more others are arrested in Barangay Zaragosa, Aloguinsan, Cebu. The Tiamzon's had a standing warrant of arrest orders for crimes against humanity which include murder, multiple murder, and frustrated murder charges. 5 days after the arrest of the couple, last March 27, Andrea Rosal, who was the daughter of former NPA spokesman "Ka Roger" Rosal (deceased) was arrested in Caloocan.
- March 27 – The five-page Comprehensive Agreement on Bangsamoro is signed in Malacañan Palace grounds by the government's peace panel chair Miriam Coronel-Ferrer and MILF negotiator Mohager Iqbal. The signing was also attended by a thousand people, including President Aquino III, MILF chairman Al Haj Murad Ebrahim, Prime Minister Najib Razak of Malaysia, and the Presidential Advisor on the Peace Process Teresita Deles. The CAB comprises the Bangsamoro Framework, including its annexes on Transitional Arrangements and Modalities, Revenue Generation and Wealth Sharing, Power Sharing, Normalization, and the addendum on Bangsamoro Waters and Zones of Joint Cooperation.
- March 29 – A Philippine civilian vessel carrying supplies for eight soldiers stationed in BRP Sierra Madre, a grounded ship turned military outpost, evades a blockade by two Chinese Coast Guard ships in Ayungin Shoal (known internationally as Second Thomas Shoal).
- March 30 – The Philippines submits its 10 volume memorial or written pleading on the territorial feud against China in the South China Sea to the International Tribunal for the Law of the Sea (ITLOS).

=== April ===
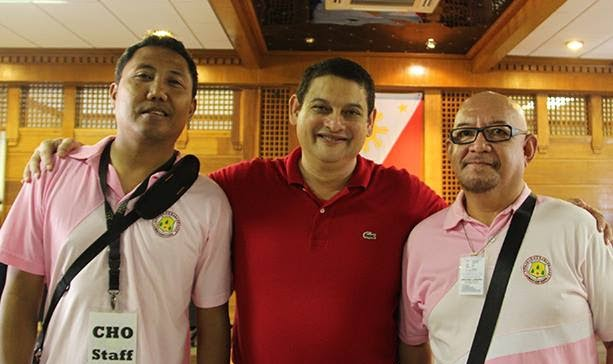
Sen. Teofisto "TG" Guingona III, announced the recommendation of filing of plunder and graft changes to Senators Juan Ponce Enrile, Jinggoy Estrada, and Bong Revilla, alongside Janet Lim-Napoles who involved in the Pork Barrel (PDAF) scam.

- April 1 – The Senate Blue Ribbon Committee, chaired by Senator Teofisto Guingona III, announce and recommend the filing of plunder and graft charges to Senators Juan Ponce Enrile, Jinggoy Estrada, and Bong Revilla together with Janet Lim-Napoles over their involvement in the Priority Development Assistance Fund (PDAF) scam. Other recommended to be charged were Gigi Reyes (Enrile's former Chief of Staff), Pauline Labayen (Estrada's former appointments Secretary), Richard Cambe (Revilla's political staff), former National Agribusiness Corporation (Nabcor) President Alan Javellana, and former Technology Resource Center (TRC) Director Antonio Ortiz. The committee also pressed further investigation to other four involved members of the House of Representatives, Janet Lim–Napoles' family and friends, and other involved government officials. The Office of the Ombudsman later announced that they will file plunder and graft charges to Lim–Napoles, and to the three involved Senators.
- April 2 – A Filipina resort employee and a Chinese tourist are kidnapped by seven armed members of the Abu Sayyaf in Singamata Reef Resort, Semporna, Sabah, Malaysia.
- April 4 – Senators Ralph Recto, Lito Lapid and former congressmen Corazon Malanyaon of Davao Oriental, Roberto Cajes and Eladio Jala of Bohol, Roger Mercado of Southern Leyte, Alipio Badelles of Lanao del Norte, and Eileen Ermita-Buhain of Batangas are implicated in the Nabcor fund anomaly worth tens of millions of pesos.
- April 8:
  - Former Vice President and Housing and Urban Development Coordinating Council chairman Noli de Castro, currently the anchor of ABS-CBN's TV Patrol, attends the hearing of the Senate Committee on Housing, Urban Planning and Resettlement on the P6.6 billion housing scam of Delfin Lee's Globe Asiatique. De Castro admitted not having a special treatment to Lee on the arrangement between Pag-IBIG fund and GA.
  - SC upholds the constitutionality of Republic Act No. 10354, also known as the Responsible Parenthood and Reproductive Health Act of 2012, except for eight provisions (including Section 7, Section 17 and Section 23) which were partially or fully declared as unconstitutional.

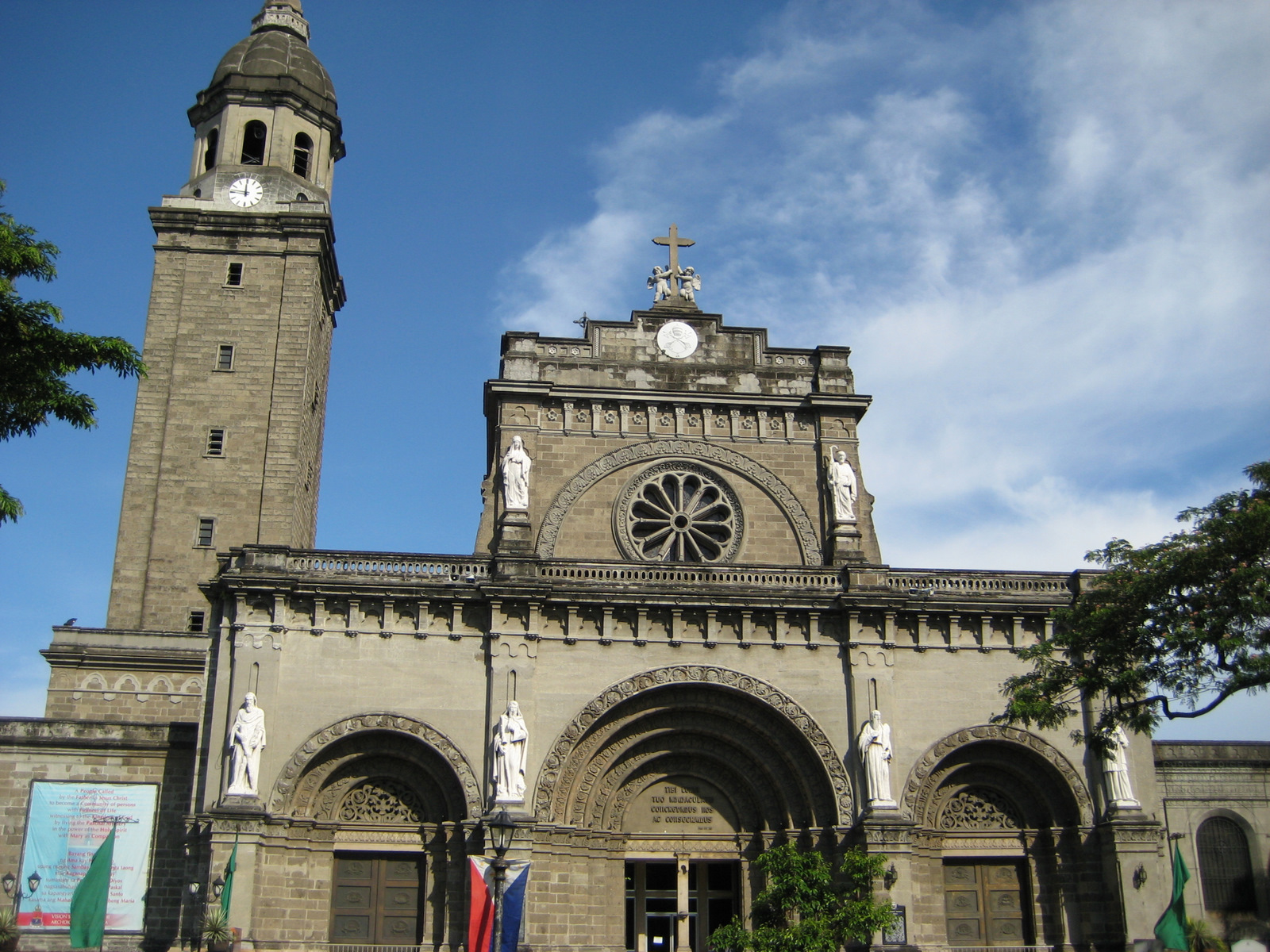
The Manila Cathedral.

- April 9 – The Manila Cathedral in Intramuros, Manila is reopened to the public after a 2-year structural retrofitting and rehabilitation due to cracks inside the structure. The project cost was 136 million pesos. President Aquino III, together with Senate President Franklin Drilon and Papal Nuncio Giuseppe Pinto, attended the first mass after the reopening led by Manila Archbishop Luis Antonio Tagle.
- April 10:
  - The Philippine aviation industry, through the Civil Aviation Authority of the Philippines (CAAP), is finally upgraded into "Category 1" status given by the U.S. Federal Aviation Administration (FAA) after CAAP successfully complied with international safety standards set by the International Civil Aviation Organization (ICAO).
  - Cebu Pacific's ban on flying their planes to any Europe destinations is lifted by the European Union.
- April 11:
  - The Philippines and the U.S. reach an agreement on sharing local military bases with the U.S. military forces during times of humanitarian and maritime operations.
  - 20 government troops are injured in an encounter with the Abu Sayyaf Group in Tipo-Tipo, Basilan.
- April 14–13 policemen, including Philippine National Police (PNP) Superintendent Hansel Marantan, are relieved from their duties in connection with the January 2013 Atimonan rub-out incident that killed suspected gambling leader Vic Siman, environmentalist Jun Lontok and 10 others.
- April 15 – The Department of Energy (DOE) issues a yellow alert status on the Luzon grid following a series of temporarily shutdown of the Masinloc and Pagbilao power plants that decreased the island's power reserves.
- April 19 – Gigi Reyes, former chief of staff of Senate Minority Leader, Sen. Juan Ponce Enrile which is one of the recommended by the Ombudsman to charged for plunder over the PDAF scam, return to the country.
- April 23 – In a joint statement, the government delegations of the Philippines led by Manila Mayor Estrada and Hong Kong agree that the four demands of the 2010 Manila hostage crisis' victims and their families were resolved. Visa sanctions for Philippine officials and diplomats were also lifted by Hong Kong.
- April 28 – The Pasig River Ferry Service is re-opened to the public. Metropolitan Manila Development Authority (MMDA) Chairman Francis Tolentino led the reopening of the ferry system at the Guadalupe terminal in Makati. Riding the ferry was given for free to the public for two weeks. The ferry service was one of the solutions for the decongestion of Metro Manila's roadways.
- April 30 – The Philippine National Police (PNP) together with the Supreme Court, and the DOJ launch the "e-subpoena system" that will speed up delivering and transmitting subpoenas issued by the courts to the police stations.
- April 30–2 – PNP in cooperation with the International Criminal Police Organization (INTERPOL) launch a simultaneous campaign called "Operation Strike Back" that lead in the arrest of 58 suspects involve in internet sextortion syndicate in 4 key areas in Luzon (including Bicol, Taguig, Bulacan and Laguna) in connection with the suicide attempt of 17-year-old Dunfermline teenager Daniel Perry due to webcam blackmail plot.

=== May ===
- May 2 – The Office of the Ombudsman grants Ruby Tuason immunity from criminal prosecution and her request to be a state witness in the PDAF scam case. Tuason also returned the 40 million pesos, part of the earnings or kickbacks used in the PDAF transactions, to the National Treasury in front of Justice Secretary Leila de Lima and Ombudsman Conchita Carpio-Morales.
- May 5–16 – The 30th Balikatan joint-military exercises between the Philippines and United States military forces commence. More than 3,000 Filipino soldiers and 2,500 US military joined various drills for the Balikatan which will center on humanitarian response, and maritime security and defense.

The Commission on Elections (COMELEC) main office.

- May 6:
  - Former Senator Francis Pangilinan take an oath as the first Presidential Assistant for Food Security and Agricultural Modernization, holding a cabinet rank position. Pangilinan will oversee the operations of 4 agencies of the Department of Agriculture which has been moved to the Office of the President: the National Food Authority, the National Irrigation Administration, the Philippine Coconut Authority, and the Fertilizer and Pesticide Authority.
  - The Commission on Elections (COMELEC) kicks off the voters registration for the 2016 national elections with the start of "Walkah Walkah: Step Juan Tungo sa Mulat na Botante" campaign in Laoag City.
  - Even after undergoing a nose job, Abigail Pendulas, wife of Aman Futures Group owner Manuel Amalilio who was involved in a pyramiding scam, was arrested by the Central Luzon PNP in San Fernando City, Pampanga.
  - A Chinese fishing boat carrying more than 11 crew and 500 turtles is seized by the operatives of the PNP Maritime Police Patrol in Half-Moon Shoal (locally known as Hasa-Hasa Shoal) at the Spratlys Group of Islands.
  - Transportation Secretary Joseph Emilio Abaya is charged with graft and corruption for a P1.1-billion deal signed for automated ticketing systems. After a complaint was launched by the National Federation of Filipino Consumers the Office of the Ombudsman brought forth charges. The Contactless Automated Fare Collection System was awarded through a competitive transaction process to an ineligible firm, AF Consortium, and was in violation of Section 3 of the Anti-Graft and Corrupt Practices Act. Due to conflict of interest and an ongoing case against the Government, AF Consortium should have been disqualified by the transaction team. The lead adviser to the Government on this transaction was Rebel Group International BV of the Netherlands.
- May 8 – The Ombudsman clears former president and current Pampanga congresswoman Gloria Macapagal Arroyo on her involvement on the P728 million fertilizer fund scam.
- May 9 – Citing personal reasons, Margie P. Juico, the chairwoman and former long-time board of directors of PCSO tenders her resignation. Former Cavite Governor (then-former Cavite third district congressman and defeated 2013 Cavite gubernatorial election candidate), Ayong Maliksi will possibly replace Juico as the chairman. This after the agency announced the relocation of the main office from PICC to Shaw Boulevard, Mandaluyong.
- May 10–11 – President Aquino III, together with fellow Southeast Asian leaders, attend the 24th ASEAN Summit held at the Myanmar International Convention Center in Nay Pyi Taw, Myanmar. The territorial dispute in the West Philippine Sea was the center of this year's summit.

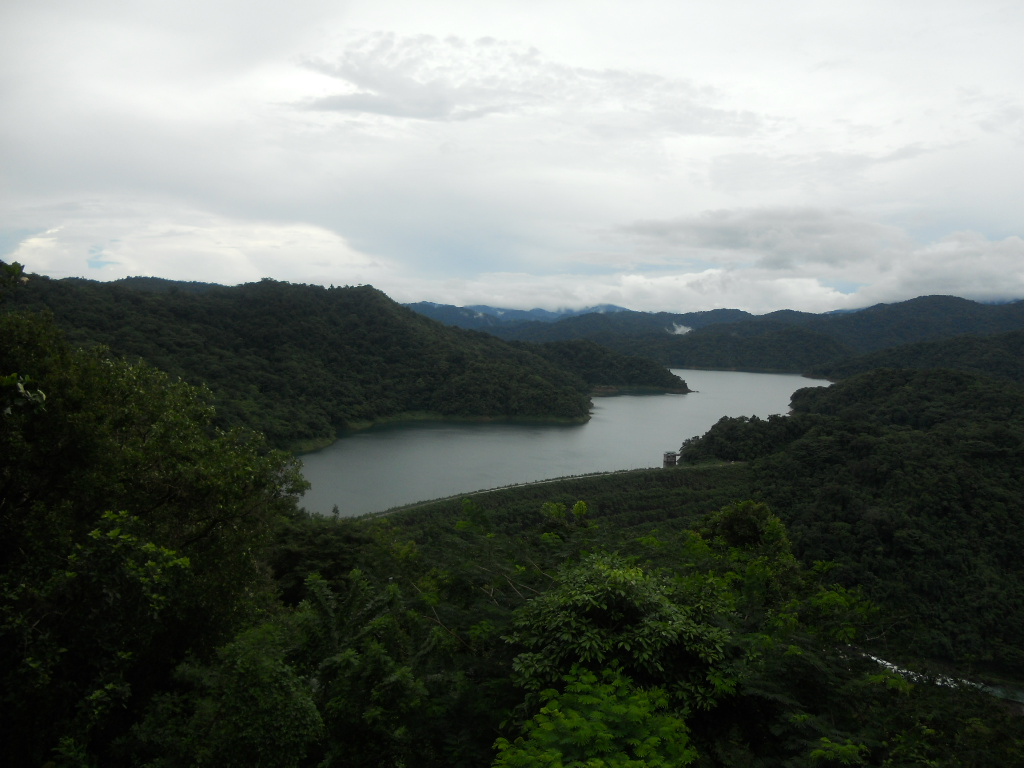
Angat Dam, one of Luzon's dams with short water reserves due to the 2014 dry season.

- May 12 – Angat Dam reaches the critical level as the water level dropped to 179.72 meters above sea level, relatively due to the effect of the dry season. Release of water for the irrigation in farm areas of Bulacan and Pampanga were cut off.
- May 13 – Lacson's Napoles list of involved politicians is released to the public. On May 14, whistleblower Benhur Luy's list was also released, with 25 senators included in the said list to be involved with any Janet Napoles transactions.
- May 13–16 – The PNP hosts the recently concluded 34th Association of Southeast Asian Nations Association of Chiefs of Police (ASEANAPOL) Conference held at the Sofitel Philippine Plaza, Pasay. PNP Chief Alan Purisima together with 9 ASEAN chiefs of Police joined the meeting. President Aquino III led the first day of the meeting where he said that the ASEAN will continue to fight against transnational crimes.
- May 14 – The Philippines protests to China's alleged construction activities in Johnson Reef (known locally as Mabini Reef) of the disputed Spratlys Group of Islands.
- May 19 – President Aquino III leads the opening day of the 2014 United Nations World Tourism Organization (UNWTO) – ASEAN Conference on Tourism and Climate Change in Legaspi City, Albay. Aquino III said he keeps focus on the tourist arrivals target of estimated 10 million tourist before his term ends in 2016.
- May 21 – Following the overspending of campaign funds for his running for the 2013 Laguna gubernatorial elections, The COMELEC En Banc unseats Laguna Gov. E.R. Ejercito, in a unanimous decision. Vice Governor Ramil Hernandez will take over the position of Ejercito.
- May 23 – A first maritime boundary treaty for the Philippines, the Philippines and Indonesia sign a maritime treaty that draws the boundary of the two countries' overlapping exclusive economic zone (EEZ) in Mindanao and Celebes seas. It took 20 years for both countries to set the maritime boundary.
- May 26 – Al Vitangcol III formally files his resignation as the general manager of Metro Rail Transit Authority due to P517-million maintenance contract that he given to a relative.

=== June ===
- June 6:
  - The "Tacloban Declaration" disaster risk reduction and management framework agreement is launched during the Asia-Europe Meeting (ASEM) Conference on Disaster Risk Reduction and Management held in the country.
  - President Aquino III signs an executive order declaring the "State of Emergency" over Region IV-A (CALABARZON) and Basilan due to infestation of coconut scale insects in the coco plantations.
- June 11 – Khair Mandos, the alleged financier of the Abu Sayyaf Group is arrested in a joint operation of the police and military in Parañaque.
- June 16:
  - The newly renovated PNP custodial center in Camp Crame, which served as the possible detention cell of 3 senators involved in PDAF Scam is shown to the media men.
  - Department of Social Welfare and Development (DSWD) and Juvenile Justice and Welfare Council (JJWC) sign the amended Implementing Rules and Regulations of the Juvenile Justice & Welfare Act of 2006.
- June 18:
  - Sen. Pia Cayetano and the National Historical Commission of the Philippines (NHCP) are dismayed over the plan of Destileria Limtuaco, Inc. to named Filipino national heroes and places into their alcoholic drink brands.
  - President Aquino III signs Republic Act No. 10638, the 50-year expansion of the corporate life of the Philippine National Railways (PNR).
- June 20–23 – Philippine Senators Bong Revilla and Jinggoy Estrada surrender to the Sandiganbayan after the court issued a warrant for their arrest in relation to the PDAF scam.
- June 26 – The Sandiganbayan enters a not guilty plea for Senator Bong Revilla. after he refused to enter one himself in the plunder case filed against him in connection with the alleged misuse of his Priority Development Assistance Fund allocations or pork barrel funds.
- June 27 – Authorities alert several cities on Mindanao, especially Davao City and Cagayan de Oro, due to the terrorism threats made by Al-Qaeda-linked terrorist groups Abu Sayyaf and Jemaah Islamiyah bomb maker Abdul Basit Usman. Usman tried to attack Davao City.
- June 30 – The Sandiganbayan enters a not guilty plea for Senator Jinggoy Estrada, after he refused also to enter one himself in the plunder case filed against him in connection with the alleged misuse of his Priority Development Assistance Fund allocations or pork barrel funds.

=== July ===
- July 1 – The Supreme Court of the Philippines declares unconstitutional the "acts and practices" under the Aquino administration's Disbursement Acceleration Program (DAP).
- July 2 – Senator Miriam Defensor Santiago announces in public that she was diagnosed of Stage 4 cancer on her left lung.
- July 4 – Senator Juan Ponce Enrile is temporarily confined at the Philippine National Police General Hospital in Camp Crame following his surrender.
- July 11:
  - DBM Secretary Butch Abad offers his resignation letter on the unconstitutionality of Disbursement Acceleration Program but Pres. Aquino III rejected the letter.
  - The Sandiganbayan Third Division enters a not guilty plea for Senator Juan Ponce Enrile after he refused to plead during his arraignment for plunder.
  - Jessica Lucila "Gigi" Reyes is transferred to the Philippine Heart Center in Quezon City from the Taguig Pateros District Hospital after complaining of "persistent chest pains"
- July 14 – President Aquino III, in a televised public address said the government will appeal to the Supreme Court over their decision on the DAP's partial unconstitutionality.

Typhoon Rammasun making landfall in the Philippines on July 15.

- July 15–17 – Typhoon Glenda (International Name: Rammasun) leaves massive damage across Metro Manila and near-by regions, fallen down trees, electric posts, and ripped out roofs of the houses, classes in schools and work in government offices were suspended and airport, train operations and stocks trading halted after the typhoon shutdown the Metro. According to the NDRRMC, 97 persons were confirmed dead. At least 90% of the total residents of Metro Manila lost power, as poles were knocked and lines downed. The national grid corporation posted on Twitter, saying "Around 90% of Meralco's franchise area is experiencing power outage brought about by downed poles, lines and outages of the National Grid Corporation of the Philippines' transmission lines due to Typhoon Glenda."
- July 18:
  - Lt. Gen. Gregorio Pio Catapang, former Northern Luzon commander is designated as the newest AFP Chief of Staff in the turn-over ceremonies led by President Aquino III in Camp Aguinaldo. Catapang's predecessor Lt. Gen. Emmanuel T. Bautista has retired from military service.
  - The Malaysia Airlines Flight 17 is attacked and crashed near Hrabove in Donetsk Oblast, Ukraine, which killed 298 people on board including 3 Filipinos, and no survivors were recorded in the incident.
- July 21:
  - The Philippine Arena is inaugurated in Ciudad de Victoria, Bocaue, Bulacan. President Aquino III and INC Executive Minister Bro. Eduardo V. Manalo led the inauguration of the arena. With a capacity of up to 55,000, it is the largest indoor domed-arena in the world. The Iglesia ni Cristo funded the project and the opening also coincides with the church's centennial.
  - Militant group Bagong Alyansang Makabayan (Bayan) files the first valid impeachment complaint against President Aquino III in connection with DAP.
- July 22 – Youth civic groups led by Youth Act Now files an impeachment complaint against President Aquino III.
- July 23 – The Sandiganbayan summoned executives of banks to testify during the bail hearings of Senator Bong Revilla.
- July 24:
  - A third impeachment complaint is filed against President Aquino III. This time, in connection with the Philippine-United States Enhanced Defense Cooperation Agreement (EDCA).
  - Embattled Budget Secretary Butch Abad faces a Senate inquiry on the Disbursement Acceleration Program that one of the parts of which were declared unconstitutional by the Supreme Court.
- July 28 – At least 21 people are killed when armed men opened fire at a convoy of civilians in Talipao, Sulu who were travelling to a feast to mark the end of Ramadan.

=== August ===
- August 1:
  - The Supreme Court of the Philippines directs the Sandiganbayan to file its comment on the petition of the former chief of staff of Sen. Juan Ponce Enrile, attorney Gigi Reyes, to be released from detention and her plunder and graft trials halted.
  - The Ombudsman of the Philippines finds probable cause to indict Senator Lito Lapid and several others for violation of the Anti-Graft and Corrupt Practices Act in connection with the P728 million fertilizer fund scam.
- August 8 – The Sandiganbayan denies with finality the appeal of detained Senator Juan Ponce Enrile to dismiss the plunder case filed against him in connection with the pork barrel scam. The anti-graft court's Third Division said he failed to present new reasons for the court to reconsider its earlier ruling finding probable cause to proceed with the case and issue warrant of arrest against him.
- August 11 – ACT-Teachers party-list Rep. Antonio Tinio leads several teachers in submitting the fourth impeachment complaint against President Benigno Aquino III over what they claimed as the continuation of the pork barrel system in Congress.
- August 12 – After 3 years of hiding, Retired General Jovito Palparan who was accused in the case of disappearance of UP students' Sherlyn Cadapan and Karen Empeno in 2006 is arrested in Santa Mesa, Manila.
- August 18 – Vice President Jejomar Binay and his son, Makati Mayor Junjun Binay face plunder charges in the alleged overprice of a carpark building filed a supplemental petition reflecting a bigger cost for the project.
- August 20:
  - A civil society group files three separate graft and plunder complaints against Senator Alan Peter Cayetano and his wife, Taguig Mayor Lani Cayetano. Lawyer Roderick Vera of the group Philippine Association for the Advancement of Civil Liberties, Inc. charged them with violations of the Anti-Graft and Corrupt Practices Act before the Office of the Ombudsman.
  - Renato Bondal shows up on the Senate blue ribbon investigation on the overpriced cost of construction of Makati City Hall Building II, a supposed parking building worth P2.1M. Bondal also accused Binays over the overpriced birthday cakes given to the senior citizens.
- August 24 – Davao City Mayor Rodrigo Duterte confirms that some of city's residents were recruited by the terrorist group Islamic State of Iraq and Syria.

=== September ===
- September 2 – Allies of President Aquino III in the House Justice Committee quash the 3 impeachment complaints against him, finding them not sufficient in substance.
- September 3:
  - Former presidential candidate Elly Pamatong, who was being linked to the foiled bombing attempt at Ninoy Aquino International Airport (NAIA), is arrested.
  - Sec. Sonny Coloma in the hearing for the 2015 PCOO Senate budget and GCGA discloses that efforts to privatize IBC-13 will continue next year despite legal obstacles. Escudero suggest to Congress to allocate subsidy for unpaid GSIS, SSS, PhilHealth contributions of the network employees.
- September 4 – Senators criticize the exorbitant Makati's P350-million allocation for the transfer of its urban planning office and data center to the allegedly overpriced P2.7-billion Makati City Hall Building 2. The general contractor for the allegedly overpriced building clarified that the company did not give then Makati Mayor Jejomar Binay or any other city officials kickbacks.
- September 5 – Suspended Senator Juan Ponce Enrile enters a not guilty plea in the 15 counts of graft against him in connection with the pork barrel scam.
- September 8 – DPWH initially sets plans for the demolition of Anda Circle in Manila and converted into an intersection to ease traffic and congestion near the port area.
- September 10:
  - President Aquino III leads the handover of the draft of the Bangsamoro Basic Law to the Senate and House leaders in a historical turnover ceremony at Malacañang.
  - Sen. Miriam Defensor-Santiago walks out from the Commission on Appointments Foreign Affairs Committee hearing after Congressman Rodolfo Fariñas questioned her authority to continue with the hearing without a quorum. He first asked if the hearing was a public hearing or if it was a meeting of the committee for proper recommending the appointment of the official to the plenary.
- September 14:
  - At least 70 people are still missing after the ferry MV Maharlika II sinks off the Philippines island of Leyte.
  - Typhoon Luis hits the northeast Philippines with warnings of potential floods and landslides.
- September 15 – Philippine Institute of Volcanology and Seismology (PHILVOLCS) issues Alert Level 3 or "Quick Alert" for Mayon Volcano after it showed signs of relative signs of restlessness.
- September 18 – Vice President Jejomar Binay delivers a 20-minute address to answer the allegations of the overpriced P2.7-billion Makati Hall Building 2. He said the charges of corruption against him were "all lies" and testimony on them in the Senate would not stand up in court.
- September 19 – 18 dead, 16 injured and 104,000 families are affected after heavy rains and floods due to Tropical Storm Mario and the intensified southwest monsoon shuts down Metro Manila.
- September 22 – PNP Chief Director General Alan Purisima faces graft, plunder and indirect bribery complaints over an allegedly undervalued property and the renovation of a multi-million residence at the general police headquarters in Camp Crame.
- September 30 – Senator Grace Poe quizzes Philippine National Police chief Director General Alan Purisima's purchase of a Land Cruiser for only P1.5 million. During the hearing of the Senate committee on public order and dangerous drugs, Poe said a Land Cruiser normally costs P4 million to P7 million.

=== October ===
- October 2–3 – Former DA Secretary and Bohol Congressman Arthur Yap along with former congressmen Prospero Nograles of Davao City, Candido Pancrudo, Jr. of Bukidnon, and Thomas Dumpit Jr. of La Union are filed with criminal charges for the misuse of their Priority Development Assistance Fund (PDAF) or pork barrel which totaled to P163.2 million. Former congresswoman and current Governor Rizalina Seachon-Lanete of Masbate is facing a plunder case for the alleged anomalous use of her Priority Development Assistance Fund (PDAF), or pork barrel fund allocations, worth P112.29 million from 2007 to 2009. Also indicted were former Rep. Samuel Dangwa of Benguet, former Rep. Rodolfo Plaza of Agusan del Sur and former Rep. Constantino Jaraula of Cagayan de Oro with several counts of malversation and direct bribery, also in connection with the pork barrel scam allegedly engineered by Janet Lim-Napoles.
- October 5 – PNP Chief Purisima's is allegedly accused of owning a multimillion residential property in San Leonardo, Nueva Ecija.
- October 8 – Total lunar eclipse is witnessed in the Philippines. It was witnessed by amateur astronomers and eclipse watchers throughout the country after sunset.
- October 9:
  - Senator Ramon "Bong" Revilla Jr. could face money laundering charges as the Anti-Money Laundering Council (AMLC) told the Sandiganbayan that Revilla deposited at least P87.6 million in his bank accounts during the supposed period he was accused of participating in the pork barrel scam.
  - Department of the Interior and Local Government (DILG) Secretary Manuel Roxas II sacks district directors of the Philippine National Police (PNP) Chief Superintendent Rolando Asuncion of the Manila Police District (MPD), Chief Superintendent Edgardo Layon of Northern Police District (NPD), Chief Superintendent Richard Albano of the Quezon City Police District (QCPD) and Chief Superintendent Jet Erwin Villacorte of the Southern Police District (SPD); only Chief Superintendent Abelardo Villacorta of the Eastern Police District (EPD) was spared from the sacking.
- October 10 – Former Makati Vice Mayor Ernesto Mercado accuses the Binay family over the alleged 35-hectare estate "Hacienda" in Rosario, Batangas.
- October 11 – 26-year-old Filipino transgender Jennifer Laude is found dead inside a motel in Olongapo City. US Marine Private First Class (PFC) Joseph Scott Pemberton was tagged as the prime suspect. He was placed inside USS Peleliu under the US Navy custody.
- October 17 – Two German nationals Stefan Viktor Okonek and Henrike Dielen, are released by the members of Abu Sayyaf in Patikul, Sulu.
- October 21 – Manuel Amalilio, the brains behind a P12 billion Ponzi scheme in the Philippines, is freed by a Malaysian court; the extradition request for Amalilio was also denied by the Malaysian government.
- October 23 – Embattled businesswoman Janet Lim-Napoles, former Agriculture Secretary Arthur Yap, and 6 more former congressmen will face preliminary investigation before the Office of the Ombudsman over the pork barrel scam they were Alvin Sandoval of Navotas & Malabon, Marina Clarete of Misamis Occidental, Reno Lim of Albay, Rodolfo Antonino of Nueva Ecija, Teodulo Coquilla of Eastern Samar and Anthony Miranda of Isabela.
- October 28 – Former Makati Mayor Elenita Binay, wife of Vice President Jejomar Binay posts bail for the graft and malversation charges before the anti-graft court's Third Division in connection with the alleged anomalous purchase of P8.83 million worth of medical equipment and supplies in 2001 during her incumbency as Makati mayor.
- October 29:
  - President Benigno Aquino III approves the P170.9-billion master plan to rebuild areas devastated by Typhoon Yolanda, almost a year after the powerful storm devastated parts of central Philippines.
  - Former Iloilo Provincial Administrator Manuel Mejorada Jr. files criminal charges against Senate President Franklin Drilon, Tourism Secretary Ramon Jimenez Jr., and Public Works Secretary Rogelio Singson in connection with the alleged overpricing in the construction of the Iloilo Convention Center (ICC).

=== November ===
- November 2 – Members of the notorious Abu Sayyaf Group are killed at least six soldiers in Basilan.
- November 5 – The Burgos Wind Farm, the biggest wind farm in the country and Southeast Asia is fully commissioned.
- November 11:
  - PNP Chief Police Director General Alan Purisima denies buying land in Talisay, Batangas as alleged in a news report, adding he has ordered the police to look into the matter.
  - Vice President Jejomar Binay said he is backing out of a debate with Sen. Antonio Trillanes IV scheduled on November 27.
- November 12 – Health Secretary Enrique Ona and Health Assistant Secretary Eric Tayag is investigated by National Bureau of Investigation for the alleged purchase of expensive vaccines in 2012.
- November 13 – Senate President Franklin Drilon and the two Cabinet secretaries are implicated in the alleged overpricing of the P700-million Iloilo Convention Center have confirmed their attendance in the Senate Blue Ribbon Committee inquiry.
- November 18 – Former Makati Vice Mayor Ernesto Mercado alleges before the Senate Blue Ribbon Subcommittee that presumptive presidential candidate, Vice President Jejomar Binay, was given units in 60 to 70 percent of condominium buildings in the city in exchange for faster processing of permits, tax relief and other privileges for the developers.
- November 19 – The Sandiganbayan Third Division enters a not guilty plea for James Christopher Napoles and Jo Christine Napoles, the son and daughter of Janet Lim-Napoles for numerous graft cases filed against them in connection with the multibillion-peso pork barrel scam.
- November 20 – The Sandiganbayan 5th Division find seven former officials of the Quezon City Engineer's Office guilty beyond reasonable doubt of a violation of the Anti-Graft and Corrupt Practices Act in connection with the Ozone Disco Club fire on March 18, 1996, killing 162 people.
- November 21 – Nine Hong Kong journalists who shouted questions at President Benigno Aquino III during the Asia Pacific Economic Cooperation summit in Bali, Indonesia last year are barred from covering the APEC in the Philippines for 2015. On November 25, the Bureau of Immigration (BI) lifted a ban on nine Hong Kong journalists.
- November 24 – A Palawan court finds nine Chinese fishermen guilty of poaching and environmental crimes for fishing in disputed waters in connection with the poaching incident in Half Moon Shoal (Hasa-Hasa Shoal) on May 6.
- November 25 – The Supreme Court orders the relocation of the Pandacan oil depot, which houses the oil storage facilities of the three major petroleum companies in the country.
- November 26 – The Office of the Ombudsman indicts former Presidential Commission on Good Government (PCGG) chairman Camilo Sabio for graft after he allegedly tried to influence his brother Associate Justice Jose Sabio Jr., then a magistrate in the Court of Appeals, as regards an ownership row in the Manila Electric Co. (Meralco) in 2008.
- November 27 – A multisectoral group files with the Office of the Ombudsman graft and plunder charges against House Majority Leader Neptali Gonzales II over the alleged misuse of the lawmaker's pork barrel funds amounting to P315 million from 2007 to 2009.

=== December ===
- December 1:
  - Twelve NGOs linked to alleged pork barrel scam brains Janet Lim-Napoles corners the P900 million in royalties from the Malampaya gas fund released to the Department of Agrarian Reform.
  - Chinese vessels stop harassing Filipino ships en route to the disputed Ayungin Shoal after the Philippines and the United States signed the Enhanced Defense Cooperation Agreement in April, Defense Secretary Voltaire Gazmin told a Senate committee.
- December 2:
  - The Sandiganbayan First Division junks the bids of Sen. Ramon "Bong" Revilla Jr., his staff Richard Cambe and trader Janet Lim-Napoles for temporary freedom in connection with the alleged multibillion-peso pork barrel scam.
  - Filipino peacekeepers from Liberia leave Caballo Island after undergoing a 21-day quarantine there.
  - President Benigno Aquino III signs Republic Act No. 10648, also known as the "Iskolar ng Bayan" Act.
- December 4 – The Office of the Ombudsman orders the preventive suspension of PNP Chief Director General Alan Purisima in connection with a supposed anomalous contract the PNP entered into with a courier service in 2011.

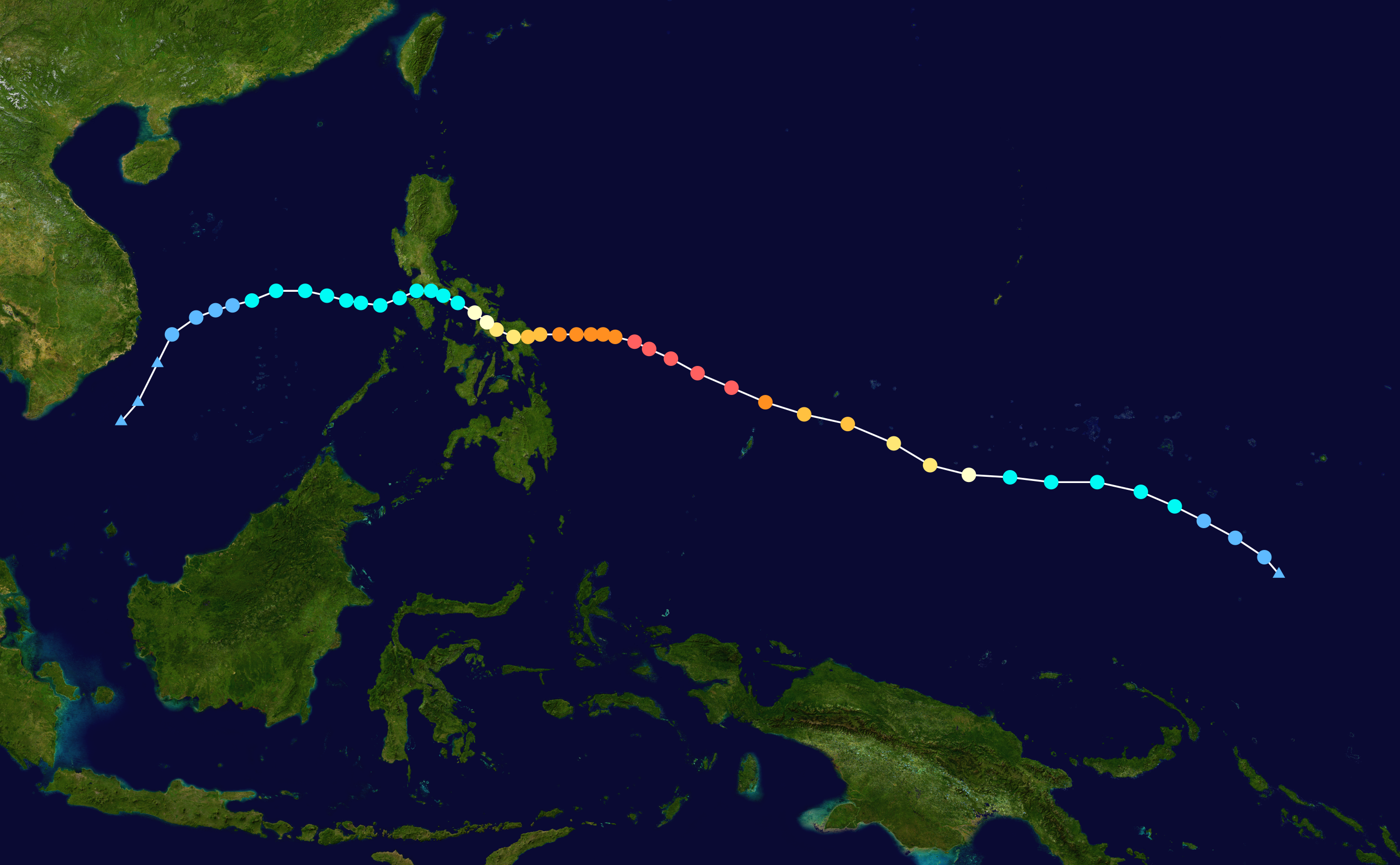
Typhoon Ruby hit the Philippines on December 6–10, 2014.

- December 6–10 – Typhoon Ruby (International Name: Hagupit) leaves massive damaged across Eastern Visayas and Western Visayas and near-by provinces in Luzon, fallen down trees, electric posts, and ripped out roofs of the houses, classes in schools and work in government offices were suspended and airport, train operations and stocks trading halted. According to the NDRRMC, 18 Persons were confirmed dead.
- December 6 – Swiss national Lorenzo Vinciguerra and one of three birdwatchers seized by the Abu Sayyaf in 2012, escape in Patikul, Sulu.
- December 7 – Vigan in Ilocos Sur is chosen as one of the New7Wonders Cities, organizers announced in Dubai.
- December 9 – Ten people are killed including 5 Students of the Central Mindanao University while 42 others were hurt in a bus explosion in Musuan, Maramag, Bukidnon.
- December 11 – Iligan City Rep. Vicente Belmonte survives after his convoy was ambushed in Laguindingan, Misamis Oriental. Three of his bodyguards were killed while two others also wounded.
- December 15 – Justice Secretary Leila de Lima, accompanied by elements of the National Bureau of Investigation, Philippine Drug Enforcement Agency and Philippine National Police, hold a surprise inspection at the national penitentiary's maximum security compound inside the New Bilibid Prison in Muntinlupa.
- December 16 – Renato Bondal, attorney and a former political opponent of Vice President Jejomar Binay, files graft and plunder charges against him and 30 others in connection with the alleged overpricing of the construction of the P1.33-billion Makati Science High School.
- December 19 – Enrique Ona formally files his resignation as Health Secretary due to the P833-million Pneumococcal Conjugate Vaccine 10 (PCV 10) in 2012.
- December 24–26 – A total of 719 flights of the Cebu Pacific are cancelled and delayed because of this many passengers were angry and dismayed over the delayed flights at Ninoy Aquino International Airport Terminal 3. The Civil Aeronautics Board, Department of Transportation and Communication and the Manila International Airport Authority will conduct an investigation on this incident.
- December 26–January 1 – Tropical Storm Seniang (international name Jangmi) crosses the Visayas and Mindanao region, leaving almost 55 people dead and more than 8 others missing.
- December 29 – The Bangko Sentral ng Pilipinas (BSP) announces to the public that they will start demonetizing the old Philippine Banknotes at the start of 2015.

== Holidays ==
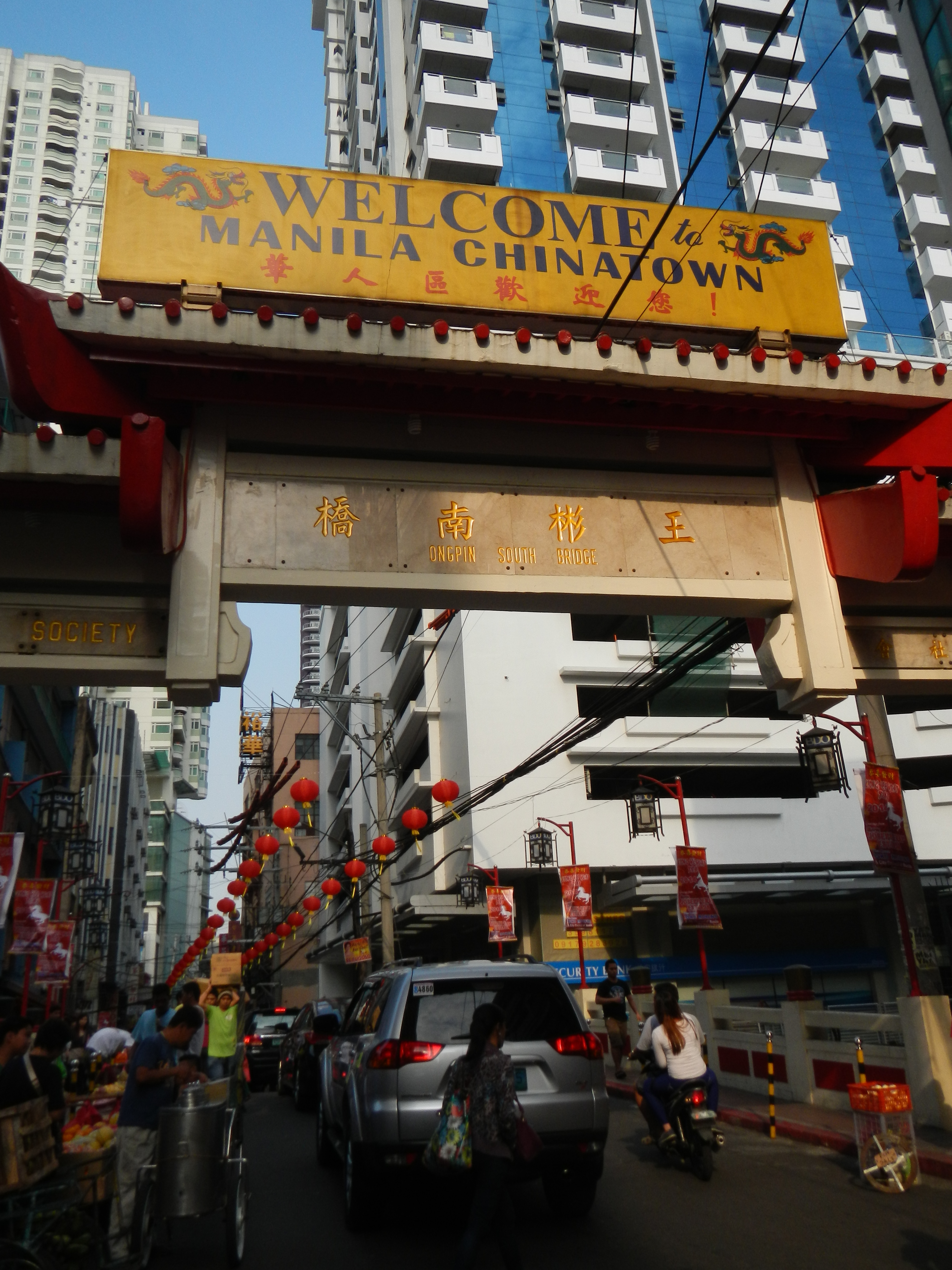
The 2014 Chinese New Year was the first time that the event was declared as a national holiday.

In late September 2013, the government had already announced at least 18 Philippine holidays for 2014 as declared by virtue of Proclamation No. 655, series of 2013. Note that in the list, holidays in italics are "special non-working holidays," those in bold are "regular holidays," and those in non-italics and non-bold are "special holidays for schools."

In addition, several other places observe local holidays, such as the foundation of their town. These are also "special days."

- January 1 – **New Year's Day**
- January 31 – Chinese New Year
- February 25 – 1986 EDSA Revolution
- April 9 – **Araw ng Kagitingan** (Day of Valor)
- April 17 – **Maundy Thursday**
- April 18 – **Good Friday**
- April 19 – Black Saturday
- May 1 – **Labor Day**
- June 12 – **Independence Day**
- July 29 – **Eid'l Fitr** (Feast of Ramadan)
- August 21 – Ninoy Aquino Day
- August 25 – **National Heroes Day**
- October 6 – **Eid al-Adha** (Feast of Sacrifices)
- November 1 – All Saints Day
- November 30 – **Bonifacio Day**
- December 24 – Special non-working holiday (in observation of the Christmas season)
- December 25 – **Christmas Day**
- December 26 – Special non-working holiday (in observation of the Christmas season)
- December 30 – **Rizal Day**
- December 31 – Last day of the year (in observation of the coming New Year's celebration)

== Business and economy ==
- March 11:
  - Analysis from Bangko Sentral ng Pilipinas expects that the country could have another credit rating upgrade earlier this year.
  - Unemployment rate jumps to 7.5% in January compared to 7.1% data a year ago, according to Philippine Statistics Authority.
- March 12 – Philippine exports rose to 9.3% in January, according to Philippine Statistics Authority.
- March 17 – World Bank revised the country's growth forecast to 6.6%, down from 6.7%.
- March 26 – Standard & Poor's raised the country's 2014 economic growth forecast to 6.6% from 6.4%.

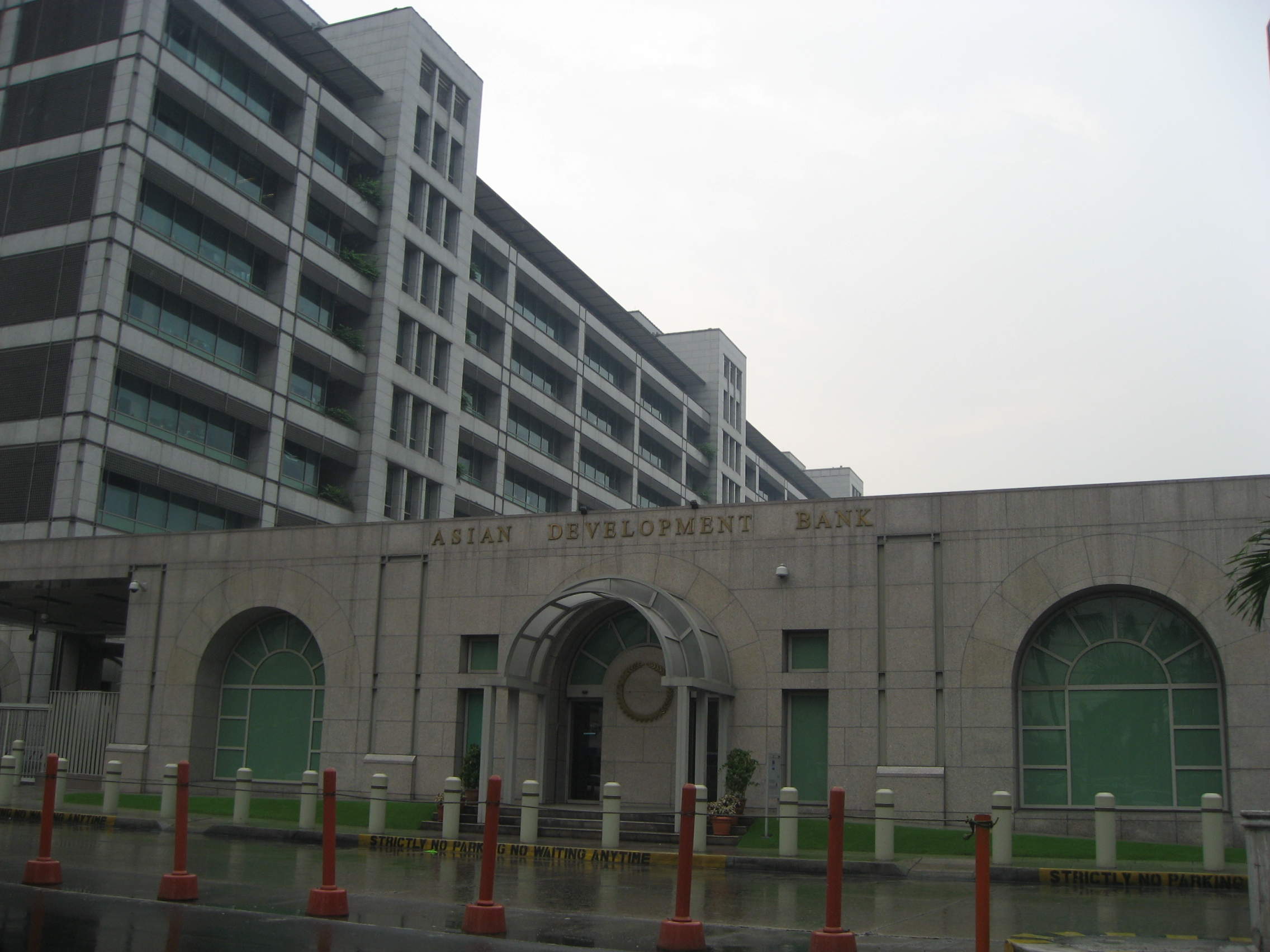
The Asian Development Bank headquarters in Mandaluyong.

- April 1 – In the Asian Development Bank's publication Asian Development Outlook 2014, the bank cites that the economy will continue to grow 6.4% in 2014, and 6.7% in 2015.
- April 3 – The country's overall ranking in the World Economic Forum's Enabling Trade Index improved from 72nd to 64th ranking. From said the index, the Philippines ranks fifth lagging behind its Southeast Asian neighbors: Singapore (ranked 1st), Malaysia (ranked 25th), Thailand (ranked 57th), and Indonesia (ranked 58th).
- April 4:
  - Inflation declined to 3.9% in March, according to the National Statistics Office.
  - Moody's Investors Service cited local banks for their moves increasing capital structure which made them comply the Basel III, a new global voluntary framework or standard for banks.
- April 9 – International Monetary Fund projected that the Philippine economy will grow to 6.5% this year and in 2015. IMF also cited that the Philippines will be one of the few ASEAN economies that will outperform other economies in the region.
- April 10 – The country hosted the ASEAN Economic Community forum, which aimed to discuss the opportunities and advantages of the ASEAN integration in 2015.
- April 21 – Compagnie Française d'Assurance pour le Commerce Extérieur named the Philippines as one of the 10 new emerging countries due to its high growth potential, favorable business environment, good production prospects, and sufficient financing to support expansion.
- May 1 – In an International Labour Organization report, the Philippines was recorded to have the highest unemployment rate among all ASEAN countries. As of 2013, the country recorded a 7.3% unemployment rate.
- May 8 – S&P upgraded the Philippines' credit rating from "BBB−" to "BBB" with a stable outlook.
- May 10 – Merchandise exports grew up by 11.2% last March 2014 due to strong demands of major commodities, according to the PSA.
- May 21–23 – For the first time, the Philippines hosted the World Economic Forum on East Asia. This year's edition of the WEF on East Asia discussed key issues on the economy in Asian countries. The 3-day forum was held at the Makati Shangri-La in Makati. Aside from the WEF, the country also hosted the 10th ASEAN Finance Ministers' Investors Summit.
- June 9 – The Department of Agriculture started their investigation on the higher prices of garlic in retail markets.
- July 2 – The Philippines signed a free-trade declaration with the ministers of the European Free Trade Association.

== Health ==
- January 4 – A total of 21 kids of the 1,500 infected died of infection due to measles. Due to the increased number of cases, DOH declares measles outbreaks in 9 cities in Metro Manila. On February 12, the measles outbreak from the country has spread to Canada, Australia, Taiwan, and the United Kingdom. By March 4, several other cases were reported in the United States.
- February 20 – Scientists from the Department of Science and Technology (DOST) has developed a wound dressing from honey, a bee-byproduct that can heal wounds better than using antibiotics.

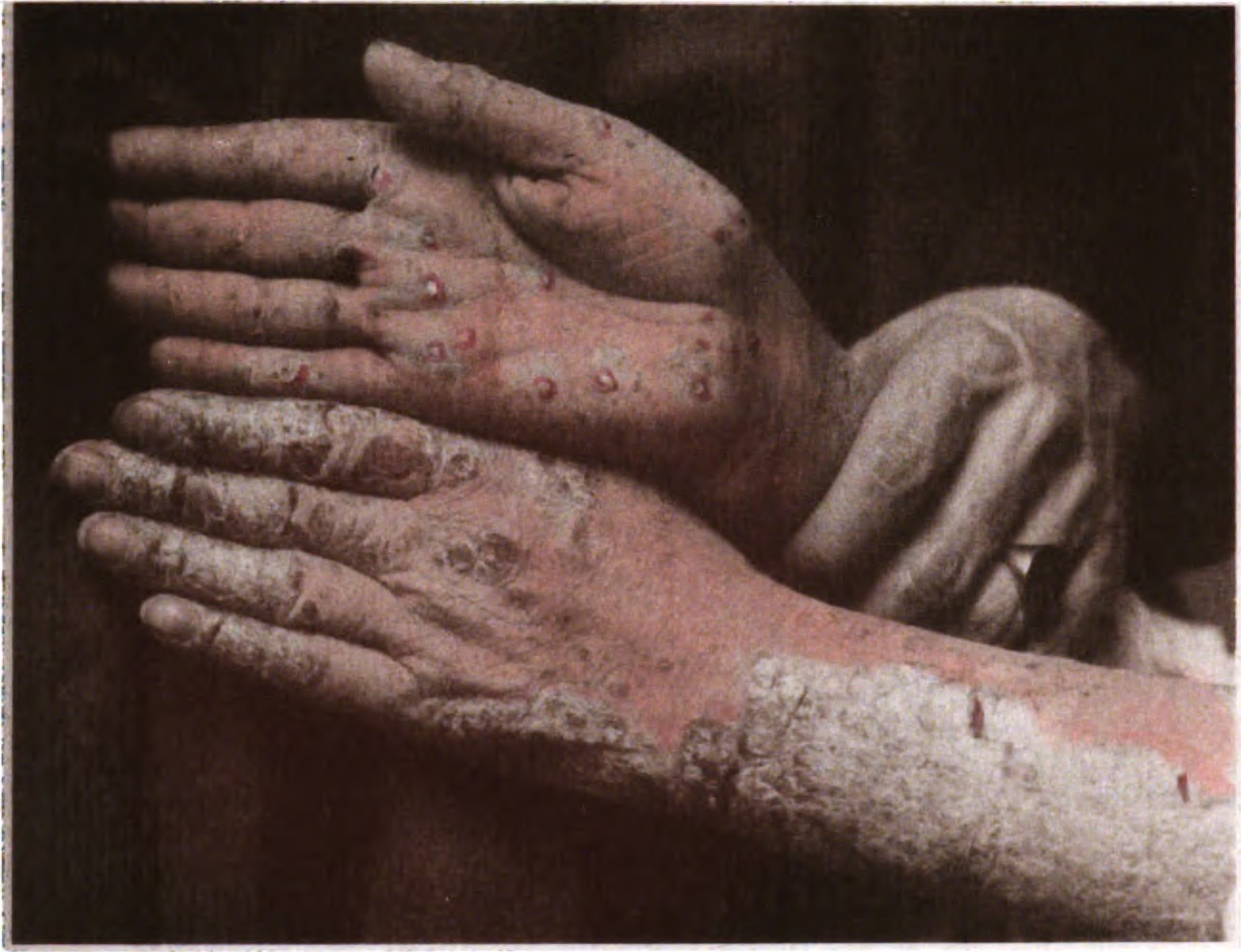
The photo above is a similar case of Psoriasis that caused panic in Pangasinan after it was identified as a flesh-eating disease. It was later announced as a hoax.

- February 25 – The Department of Health (DOH) confirmed that the mysterious flesh-eating disease affecting two persons in the province of Pangasinan was a hoax. DOH also clarified that the two individuals were in fact affected by leprosy, and a severe case of psoriasis. The said disease was first reported on Bandila, a late night news program broadcast by ABS-CBN, on February 24. The news created fear among the public. It also became a hot topic online as the mysterious disease was said to be part of a prophecy by a self-titled Indian prophet Vincent Selvakumar of the Voice of Jesus Ministries who visited the country last April 2013. Julius Babao, one of the anchors of the news program, later clarified on February 25 that it was not their intention to ignite fear among the public. He further added, "It is not the program's intention to scare the public but to report the information we gathered so that authorities would give appropriate action." On February 27, ABS-CBN issued an official statement that was broadcast on the same program apologizing for the fear and panic caused by the report that was broadcast on February 24. The network also added that their internal ombudsman office will look into the false report, and will take appropriate actions based on the findings of the network's ombudsman. On February 28, the provincial government of Pangasinan demanded for an apology from ABS-CBN. The provincial government said that the false news report had greatly damaged the province's tourism sector.
- March 24 – The government launched PhilHealth's "Alaga Ka para sa Maayos na Buhay" program, or known simply as "Alaga Ka", that is estimated to provide 14.7 million indigent families access to primary health services.
- March 28 – In a report presented by DOH, cases of multidrug resistant Tuberculosis (MDR-TB) increased to 10,000 cases in Northern Mindanao.
- April 3 – DOH reported an increase of 486 HIV/AIDS cases in February, of which 82% were men who had sex with men (MSM) cases. A total of 934 cases were reported this year.
- April 14 – DFA officials confirmed that an Overseas Filipino Worker (OFW) in the United Arab Emirates died of Middle East respiratory syndrome coronavirus (MERS-CoV) on April 10. Five OFWs who have also acquired the virus are undergoing quarantine procedures.
- April 16 – An OFW who returned from Al Ain City, United Arab Emirates was found positive of the MERS-CoV at Ninoy Aquino International Airport (NAIA). The said person was tested for the said virus in the United Arab Emirates (UAE) but immediately travelled to Manila. Doctors from UAE later contacted DOH confirming the condition of the OFW. The said OFW, who was working as a nurse in the UAE, had contact with the Filipino paramedic who had died recently in the said country. The OFW together with four of his family members who fetched him at the airport were quarantined. In a press release on April 19, DOH announced that the OFW who was found by UAE doctors positive of MERS-CoV was found negative of the virus in a subsequent test by Research Institute for Tropical Medicine (RITM). Explaining further with the test, Secretary Ona explained, "Since ten days had lapsed from the reported testing date at the UAE, our task force right away got in touch with him and decided to perform a test on him, and fortunately, as well for the comfort of everybody, the findings of our Research Institute for Tropical Medicine, he tested negative." In the said press release, DOH also announced that they are tracking all other 414 passengers of Etihad Airways Flight 424 (the flight the OFW took from Abu Dhabi, UAE to Manila) to be tested. As of April 29, 400 passengers were already contacted, of whom 371 were already tested and were found to be negative. The remaining 14 passengers have yet to be contacted.
- May 15 – The Network to Stop Aids Philippines (NSAP) wants the DOH to stop the planned implementation of mandatory HIV testing. NSAP says the testing would lead to discrimination against those who may be found infected with the dreaded virus.
- June 4–8 – The National Kidney and Transplant Institute's hemodialysis center was temporarily shut down after patients suffered chills when they used their dialysis machines. On June 9, the center partially opens. DOH continues to investigate into the matter.
- August 1 – The DFA has issued the Alert Level 1 status in Guinea, Sierra Leone and Liberia, the areas in West Africa who has already declared an outbreak of the ebola virus. DOH tightened monitoring measures in key ports in the country.

== Broadcasting and entertainment ==
- January 3 – Radio Philippines Network (RPN) and Aliw Broadcasting Corporation signed their 3-year memorandum of agreement for the simulcast of DWIZ programming to RPN Radyo Ronda provincial AM stations nationwide.
- January 10 – The 12th Gawad Tanglaw Awards, organized by Tagapuring mga Akademik ng Aninong Gumagalaw, was held at Colegio de San Juan de Letran Calamba in Calamba, Laguna.
- January 10–13 – Bombo Radyo Philippines organized the yearly Top-Level Management Conference, with the theme "Boses at Puso ng Pilipino" held in Iloilo City.
- January 13 – The revitalized morning programming grid of GMA Network's flagship AM station Super Radyo DZBB 594 was launched. Commentary program Dobol A sa Dobol B anchored by Arnold Clavio and Ali Sotto returned to the station. New programs "Easy Easy Lang" with Susan Enriquez and Lala Roque and "The Long Tall Howard Show" with Howard Medina was launched.
- January 18 – Eagle Broadcasting Corporation through its flagship AM station Radyo Agila 1062 signed a program contract with NPR for the airing of TED Radio Hour.
- February 9 – "Quick Change", directed by Eduardo Roy Jr., won the Critic Jury's Prize at the Vesoul International Film Festival of Asian Cinema in France. It also competed on March 29 to April 5 in the 28th Fribourg International Film Festival in Switzerland.
- February 13 – 1 PUP Mabini Media Awards, organized by Polytechnic University of the Philippines (PUP)
- February 17:
  - 14 RGMA provincial FM Stations were rebranded as "Barangay FM". Barangay LS 97.1 also undergoes reformatting as new logo, new jingle, new slogan and a TV commercial featuring Ryzza Mae Dizon, Alden Richards and Pauleen Luna were launched.
  - "Rekorder" by Mikhail Red won the Special Jury Prize and the Best Music at the 31st Annonay International First Film Festival held in France.

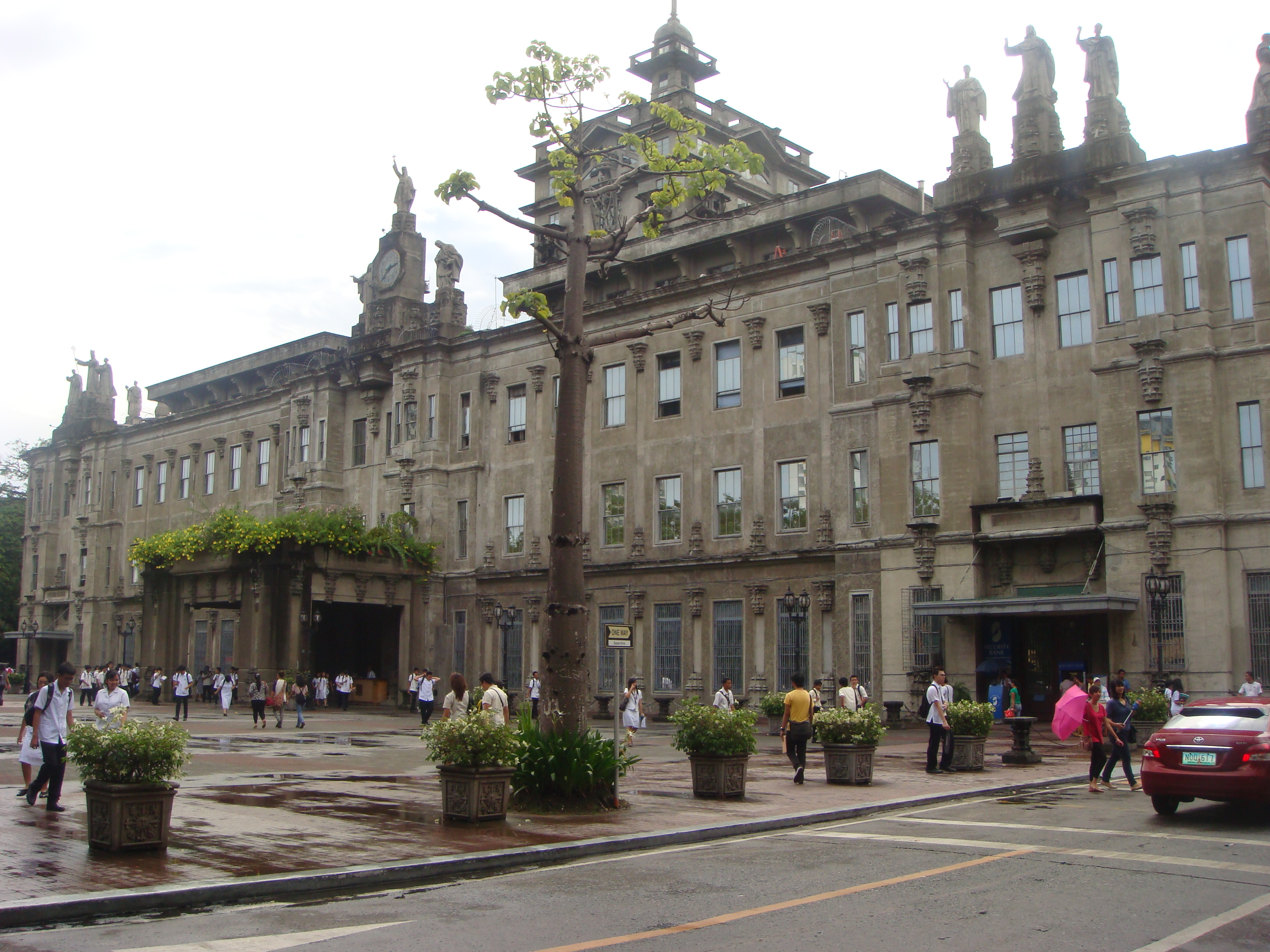
University of Santo Tomas, the organizer of the yearly USTv Students' Choice Awards.

- February 20 – The 10th USTv Students' Choice Awards, organized by University of Santo Tomas (UST), was held at theuniversity's Quadricentennial Pavilion in Manila.
- March 4–9 – "Nuwebe", directed by Joseph Israel Laban, won an honorable mention for best Director for a Narrative Feature in Queens World Film Festival held in New York City, United States.
- March 6 – 5 Northwest Samar State University Students' Choice Award for Radio and television, organized by Northwest Samar State University (NwSSU), was held at the university's Socio Cultural Center in Calbayog.
- March 9 – The 30th Star Awards for Movies, organized by the Philippine Movie Press Club (PMPC), was held in Solaire Grand Ballroom, Parañaque.
- March 12 –1 UmalohokJuan Awards, organized by Lyceum of the Philippines-Manila, held at the said university
- March 16 – "Shift", top-billed by Felix Roco and Yeng Constantino, won the Grand Prix award (equivalent to Best Picture award) in the 2014 Osaka Asian Film Festival held in Japan.
- March 17:
  - 13th Kabantugan Awards, organized by Mindanao State University (MSU), was held at Veranza Mall in General Santos.
  - After 14 years on air as an easy-listening station, 97.9 Natural (formerly Home Radio) and its provincial stations undergo reformatting again to a Hot AC-Top 40 hybrid station. Marco Avocado was the first DJ on board.
- March 18 – The triumvirate of Ian Mark Corales, Drianne Paul Saberon, and Nina Claire Rivaca from Cebu and the duos Febra Sagarino and Rueda Haictin from Dipolog and Maretchen Vasquez and Esther Martinez from Surigao were the winners of the first Boses: Tinig Pinoy singing competition organized by RPN-Radyo Ronda. The finals was held at the SM Aura Premier, Taguig.
- March 19 – The first Pinoy Music Summit was held at the Diosdado Macapagal Hall, Landbank Plaza Bldg. in Malate, Manila.
- March 21 – 2013 Golden Screen TV Awards, organized by the Entertainment Press Society, was held at Teatrino at the Promenade, Greenhills Shopping Center in San Juan City.
- March 26 – MYX Music Awards (MMA) 2014, organized by myx, was held at the SM Aura Samsung Hall in Taguig.
- March 28 – Retro 105.9 DCG FM, an oldies-format FM station that replaces Radio High 105.9 was signed on, with Andy Tuna on board on the first few hours of the station. The station is also heard in Bondoc Peninsula, Marinduque, Romblon, and Camarines Sur in Luzon via 96.7 FM in Mulanay, Quezon.
- April 5 – "On The Job", "Alagwa", and "Ang Kwento ni Mabuti" were named as the "pinakapasadong pelikula" (highly passed films) at the 16th PASADO Gawad Sining Sine organized by the Pampelikulang Samahan ng mga Dalubguro. It was held at the Far Eastern University Auditorium.
- April 11 – May 4 – Six Filipino full-length films was screened in the 4th Southeast Asian Film Festival held at the Singapore Art Museum in Singapore.
- April 13 – "Debosyon", one of the entries of 2013 Cinemalaya was recognized by the ReelWorld Film Festival as the "Honorable Mention–Outstanding International Feature" at the conclusion of the festival held in Toronto, Canada.
- April 20 – Radyo Veritas 846 (Radyo Totoo), the flagship radio station of the Catholic Media Network will celebrate its 45th anniversary with a thanksgiving mass and concert at the AFP Theater, Camp Aguinaldo, Quezon City.
- April 28 – 104.7 Brigada News FM Mega Manila, the news/Hot AC combined format-FM radio station of the Brigada Mass Media Corporation made a soft launch.
- April 29:
  - DZRH and Monster Radio 93.1 both won the Best AM and FM station awards for Metro Manila at the recently concluded 22nd KBP Golden Dove Awards. Veteran radio anchor of DZRH and Radyo Agila/Net 25 and former AGHAM party-list congressman Angelo Palmones was this year's recipient of the Ka Doroy Valencia Brodkaster of the Year.
  - 22nd KBP Golden Dove Awards, organized by Kapisanan ng mga Brodkaster ng Pilipinas, was held at the Aliw Theater, CCP Complex, Pasay.
- May 1–11 – Five Filipino full-length films (consists of "Debosyon" by Alvin Yapan, "Kabisera" by Borgy Torre, "Shift" by Siege Ledesma, "Blue Bustamante" by Miko Livelo, and "Rekorder" by Mikhail Red) was featured at the 30th Los Angeles Asian Pacific Film Festival.
- May 3 – Independent film "Mga Kwentong Barbero", directed by Jun Lana and starred by Eugene Domingo, won the 3rd place Audience Award at the 2014 Udine Far East Film Festival, held in Udine, Italy.
- May 4 – DZMM Radyo Patrol 630 organized the 5K colored fun run called "Tulong Na, Tabang Na, Tayo Na, Takbo Na" at the Bonifacio Global City. Anchors and reporters of the said radio station, DJs from MOR 101.9, and several ABS-CBN talents joined more than 3,500 runners who took part at the fun run. Philippine Army's Jujiet De Asis and Philippine Air Force's Miscelle Gilbuena dominated the male and female categories of the fun run. The proceeds of the event will benefit the victims of Typhoon Yolanda and the radio station's scholars.
- May 10 – Due to her contributions to the growth of Paoay, Ilocos Norte which is the shooting location of award-winning film "Himala", the town unveiled the monument in honor of actress Nora Aunor, the lead star of the said movie.
- May 18:
  - 2014 Box Office Entertainment Awards, organized by Guillermo Mendoza Memorial Scholarship Foundation, was held at the Solaire Resort & Casino, Pasay.
  - Sarah Geronimo and John Lloyd Cruz (It's Take A Man and A Woman) was awarded as the Box Office King & Queen of the 2014 Box Office Entertainment Awards. Vic Sotto (My Little Bossings) & Vice Ganda (Girl, Boy, Bakla, Tomboy) was proclaimed as the Phenomenal Stars of this year's awarding.
- June 1 – Far East Broadcasting Company's 98.7 DZFE The Master's Touch, the first non-commercial FM radio station in the Philippines, will celebrate its 60th anniversary this year.
- June 2 – ATC @ IBC primetime block started airing with Hi-5 as the first program.
- June 9 – Radyo PBA, the live radio coverage of the PBA games aired over DZSR Sports Radio 918 kHz and selected Radyo ng Bayan AM stations will also start to hook-up through Radyo5 News FM stations across the country.
- June 27 – Big Radio renamed as 91.5 Win Radio, the brand which used to be held by 107.5 for the past few years.
- July 15 – Manila Broadcasting Company's DZRH, the first commercial radio station in the Philippines, celebrated its 75th anniversary this year.
- June 16 – 105.1 Crossover celebrated its 20th year as a jazz and R&B station, with the theme "Celebrating 20 Years of Great Music." At the same time, the station's first disc jockey after almost a decade, Benjamin from the former 106.7 Dream FM and Citylite 88.3, went on board (6:00 am – 10:00 am weekdays).
- June 17 – Independent film actress Angeli Bayani beaten Nora Aunor and Vilma Santos and awarded as the Best Actress for the film Norte, Hangganan ng Kasaysayan in the 37th Gawad Urian Award held at the Dolphy Theater, ABS-CBN, Quezon City. Joel Torre won the Best Actor, while Norte Hangganan ng Kasaysayan was named as the Best Picture.
- June 21 – The 8 official entries for the 2014 Metro Manila Film Festival was presented to the public in a press conference in Taguig. The films will be shown starting on December 25, Christmas Day.
- June 27–30 – The 2014 International Film Expo, the biggest film expo in Southeast Asia, was held at the SMX Convention Center, SM Mall of Asia, Pasay.
- July 11 – 1 MOR Pinoy Music Awards, to be held at the Mall of Asia Arena, Pasay, coincide with the first anniversary of MOR 101.9 For Life!.
- July 18 – 2014 Yahoo Celebrity Awards Philippines, organized by Yahoo! Philippines, to be held at the Mall of Asia Arena, Pasay.
- July 20 – "Mga Kuwentong Barbero", directed by Jun Robles Lana, is nominated for best foreign film at the 3rd Madrid International Film Festival in Madrid, Spain. It is also nominated for best director of a foreign film (for Lana), best actress of a foreign film (for Eugene Domingo), and best producer of a feature film (Ferdinand Lapuz).
- July 26 – The Philippine Popular Music Festival's (Philpop), a songwriting competition, culmination night will be held at the Meralco Theater in Pasig.
- August 10:
  - Nora Aunor, Eula Valdez, Dante Rivero and Robert Arevalo won the top acting awards in the 10th Cinemalaya Independent Film Festival. Aunor ("Hustisya") was named Best Actress in the Directors Showcase category while Valdez ("Dagitab") was chosen as Best Actress in the New Breed category. Meanwhile, Arevalo ("Hari ng Tondo") won the Best Actor trophy in the Directors Showcase category and Rivero ("1st ko Si 3rd") emerged as the Best Actor in the New Breed category. Bwaya emerged as the Best Film in the New Breed category and Kasal emerged as the Best Film in the Directors Showcase category.
  - Win Radio renamed as Wish 1075, the FM station of the UNTV group under the Progressive Broadcasting Corporation and Breakthrough and Milestone Productions International, Inc. was launched.
- August 20–September 24 – Rurouni Kenshin: Kyoto Inferno and The Legend Ends was release.
- September 28 – The 2014 Himig Handog P-Pop Love Songs, a songwriting competition, will be held at the Smart Araneta Coliseum.

== Theater, culture and the arts ==
- March 10 – American weekly news Time magazine named Makati and Pasig as the "selfie capital of the world" with 258 selfie-takers per 100,000 people beating the ranks of Manhattan, New York and Miami, Florida. Other Philippine cities in the top 100 were 9th-ranked Cebu City, and Iloilo City on the 72nd place.
- March 30 – Mary Jean Lastimosa, Mary Anne Bianca Guidotti, Kris Tiffany Janson, Parul Quitola Shah, Yvethe Marie Santiago, Laura Victoria Lehmann and Hannah Ruth Sison was crowned as the new Binibining Pilipinas winners. Lastimosa was crowned by Miss Universe 2013 3rd runner-up Ariella Arida as the new Miss Universe–Philippines 2014. Guidotti was crowned as the new Binibining Pilipinas–International 2014 by Miss International 2013 Bea Santiago. Janson was crowned as the new Binibining Pilipinas–Intercontinental 2014 by Miss International 1979 Melanie Marquez. Shah was crowned as the new Binibining Pilipinas–Tourism 2014 crowned by the outgoing titleholder Cindy Miranda. Santiago was crowned as the new Binibining Pilipinas–Supranational 2014 by Miss Supranational 2013 Johanna Datul. Lehmann ended as the Binibining Pilipinas 2014 1st runner-up. Sison ended as the Binibining Pilipinas 2014 2nd runner-up.
- April 10–13 – The first Pilipinas International Hot Air Balloon Festival was held at Brgy. Prado Siongco, Lubao, Pampanga. More than 30 locally and internationally made hot air balloons joined the event.
- April 24–26 – 2014 Aliwan Fiesta was held at Roxas Boulevard, Pasay. Lumad Basakanon representing the Sinulog Festival of Cebu hailed as the streetdance champion of this year's fiesta. Steffi Aberasturi from Cebu crowned as the Reyna ng Aliwan 2014, the sixth straight time a Cebuana won the pageant.
- May 1 – Young actor Enchong Dee named as the ambassador of the National Commission for Culture & Arts for the celebration of the National Heritage Month.
- May 8–22 – "I Am Love Marie" art exhibit featuring paintings of actress Heart Evangelista was held at the Artist Space, Ayala Museum, Makati.
- May 27 – Makati was celebrated their 344th founding anniversary with a Cultural Presentation of the Makateños grand parade at the city's business district. The Grand Parade was featured several fiesta held in the country, including the Sinulog, Dinagyang, Ati-Atihan, Kadayawan, Maskara and Caracol festivals.
- June 20–August 31 – After their successful first run, Philippine Educational Theater Association's theater play "Rak of Aegis" based on the songs rendered by the Aegis band was started their second run held at the PETA Phinma Theater, Quezon City. Aicelle Santos, Robert Seña, Isay Alvarez and Arnell Ignacio led the cast of the hit theater play.
- June 17–22 – Theater play "Stomp", last seen in the country in 2011 was re-shown in Manila for the second time at the CCP Complex, Pasay.
- June 20 – President Aquino III has named six newly proclaimed National Artists, they are Alice Reyes (for Dance), Francisco Coching (for Visual Arts), Cirilo Bautista (for Literature), Francisco Feliciano (for Music), Ramon Santos (for Music) and Jose Maria Zaragoza (for Architecture, Design and Allied Arts).
- July 27:
  - Approximately 2 million members of the Iglesia ni Cristo joined the worship rites held at the Philippine Arena for the centennial celebration of the religious sect. INC also grabs 2 additional Guinness world records for the "World's Largest Mixed-Use Theater" and "World's Largest Gospel Choir."
  - The country's population has reached 100 million.
- October 12 – Valerie Weigmann was declared the winner of Miss World Philippines 2014, crowned by outgoing titleholder and current Miss World, Megan Young at the Mall of Asia Arena. She will be competing on December 14 in London for the Miss World 2014 crown.
- November 29 – Miss Philippines Jamie Herrell was crowned Miss Earth 2014 at the pageant held at the University of the Philippines (UP) Diliman Theater in Quezon City.

== Sports ==
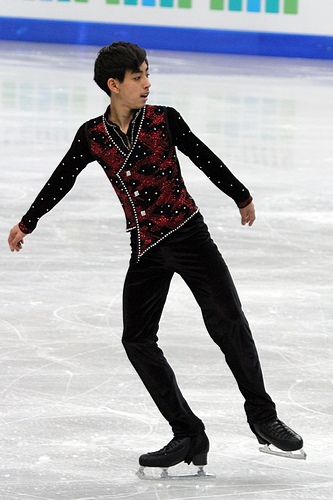
Michael Christian Martinez, the first Southeast Asian and Filipino figure skater to take part in the Winter Olympics.

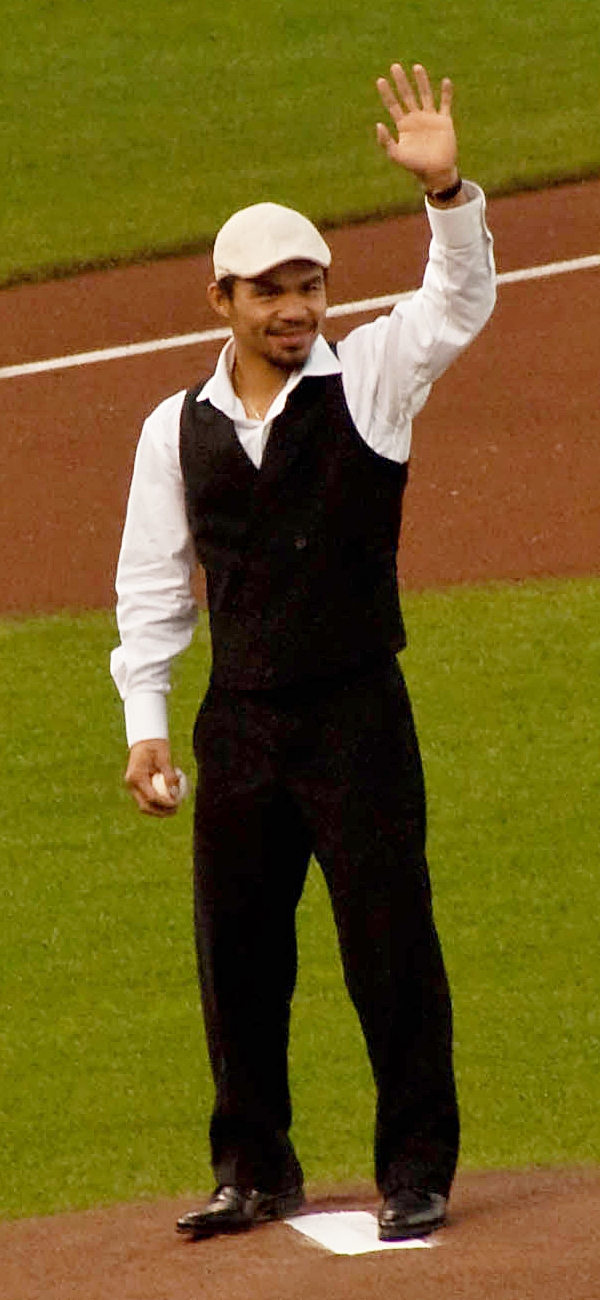
Manny Pacquiao is the only boxer who had held eight titles during his professional boxing career.

- February 7–23, Multi-sport – The Philippines competed at the 2014 Winter Olympics in Sochi, Russia. The team consists of one athlete in figure skating. The country competed at the Winter Olympics for the first time in 22 years and fourth time overall.
- February 13–14, Figure skating – On February 13, Michael Christian Martinez competed in the figure skating short program event at the 2014 Winter Olympics in Sochi, Russia scoring 64.81 points making him advance to the free skate program. By February 14, Martinez scored 119.44 points in the free skating program. He placed 19th place overall with the score of 184.25 total points. Martinez was the lone Filipino athlete competing in the Olympics, and the first Southeast Asian to compete in the figure skating event.
- February 16, Cycling – Ronda Pilipinas International ended with Reimon Lapaza declared as the winner. Peter Pouly ended as the runner-up, while Mark Galedo ranked third place.
- February 21–22, Surfing – The first Asian Surfing Championship was held at the Urbiztondo beach in San Juan, La Union.
- March 31, Boxing – Fil-Hawaiian boxer Brian Viloria won via unanimous decision on his comeback fight against Puerto Rican boxer Juan Herrera at the Texas Station Hotel & Casino, Las Vegas, Nevada.
- April 2, Volleyball – The Philippine Super Liga 1st player draft was held at the NBA Cafe, SM Aura Premier, Taguig. Former NU Lady Bulldogs star spiker Dindin Santiago was the 1st overall pick of the draft. Santiago will be played for Petron. Graduating La Salle Lady Spikers team captain Abigail Maraño picked by AirAsia Zest, the newest franchise of the league as the 2nd overall pick. AirAsia Zest will be headed by 16-year champion coach of La Salle, Ramil de Jesus.
- April 4–6, Basketball – The 2014 PBA All-Star Weekend was held at the Mall of Asia Arena in Pasay. Rey Guevara of Meralco Bolts and Justin Melton of San Mig Super Coffee Mixers tied as champions of the Slam-Dunk contest. Gilas Pilipinas won their exhibition game against PBA All-Star Selection, 101–93. Gary David, currently played for Meralco Bolts was the game's Most Valuable Player.
- April 5–6, Motorsport – The Asian V8 Championship was held in Clark International Speedway.
- April 6, Figure skating – Olympian figure skater Michael Martinez won the Triglav Trophy International Figure Skating Tournament of the senior's division in Jesenice, Slovenia.
- April 7, Football – The Philippine girl's Street Child World Cup team placed second in the said sporting event. The team was defeated by Brazil in the finals.
- April 8, Volleyball – The 8-day 2014 Asian Men's Club Volleyball Championship in Manila officially started at the SM Mall of Asia Arena.
- April 12, Boxing – In a unanimous decision, Manny Pacquiao defeated Timothy Bradley in a boxing rematch held at the MGM Grand Garden Arena, Paradise, Nevada, United States. Being a championship match, Pacquiao also regained the WBO Welterweight title against Bradley.
- April 16, Volleyball –Vatin Varamin-Iran men's volleyball team defended their championship title in the 2014 Asian Men's Club Volleyball Championship after they beaten Al-Rayyan Qatar in the championship match, 19–25, 25–17, 26–24, 25–16. PLDT Home FIBR Power Pinoys ended in the 7th place.
- April 24, Cycling – The 4-day 5th Le Tour de Filipinas edition ended with Mark Galedo declared as the winner of the bikeathon. Galedo was the 2nd Filipino to win in the competition.
- May 4–10, Multi-sport – 2014 Palarong Pambansa, the 57th edition of the multi-sports competition for the youth athletes was held at the Laguna Sports Complex, Santa Cruz, Laguna; other sporting events were also held in Pila and Los Baños. Laguna Governor E.R. Ejercito, Manila Mayor Joseph Estrada, and prominent athletes led the opening ceremonies at the second day of the games. It was followed by the unveiling of the 26-foot-tall statue of Jose Rizal as an eskrima swordsman, the tallest monument of Rizal in the world. Zeanne Faith Cabrera of the Calabarzon delegation won the first gold medal of the competition after she ruled the girls javelin throw event, Approximately more than 11,000 participants and 1,000 trainers, coaches and sports officials from 17 regions joined the event.
- August 24, Olympics – Luis Gabriel Moreno, grandson of German Moreno delivered the first medal for the Philippines in the 2014 Youth Olympic Games held in Nanjing, China.
- September 4, Basketball – Gilas Pilipinas claims their first win in the FIBA World Cup in four decades against Senegal in overtime, 81–79. Filipino fans and Malacañang Palace congratulates Gilas after their successful end of their campaign.
- September 8–9, Volleyball – 70 volleybelles attended the 2-day National Women's Volleyball tryout for the 2015 Southeast Asian Games at the Ninoy Aquino Stadium.
- November 23, Boxing – Manny Pacquiao is scheduled to fight against undefeated American boxer Christopher Algieri. The WBO Welterweight title fight will be held at the CotaiArena in Macau, China SAR. Pacquiao defeated Algieri in a unanimous decision to retain the World Boxing Organization (WBO) welterweight title in 12th round.
- November 28–30, Tennis – The 2014 Manila Mavericks season of the International Premier Tennis League (IPTL) was held in Mall of Asia Arena, Pasay, Metropolitan Manila, Philippines. On November 30, The Mavericks earned their first victory in franchise history with a 27–19 home win over the Singapore Slammers.

== Deaths ==
January

- January 8 – Antonino P. Roman, former district representative from Bataan (b. 1939)
- January 27 – Epimaco Velasco, NBI Director and Governor of Cavite (b. 1935)
- January 29 – Ildefonso P. Santos, Jr., national artist (b. 1929)

February

- February 1 – Prospero Nale Arellano, bishop-prelate emeritus of the Diocese of Libmanan (b. 1937)
- February 7 – Tado Jimenez, comedian and host (b. 1974)
- February 9 – Serafin R. Cuevas, former Supreme Court Associate Justice and Justice Secretary (b. 1928)
- February 11 – Roy Alvarez, actor (b. 1950)
- February 23 – Ely Capacio, former PBA player and coach (b. 1954)

March

- March 10 – Roldan Aquino, actor (b. 1948)
- March 31 – Bryan Gahol, former PBA player (b. 1977)

April

- April 3 – Harry Gasser, veteran news anchor (b. 1938)
- April 7 – Emilio Yap, businessman (b. 1925)
- April 15 – Júnior (Filipino singer), singer and actor (b. 1943)
- April 23 – Lorenzo Relova, former Supreme Court Associate Justice (b. 1916)
- April 26 – Protacio G. Gungon, Roman Catholic prelate, Bishop of Antipolo (b. 1925)
- April 30 – Ramil Rodriguez, actor (b. 1941)

May

- May 12 – Ruben T. Profugo, Bishop-emeritus of the Diocese of Lucena (b. 1938)
- May 13 – Anthony Villanueva, boxer and first Olympic silver medalist for the Philippines (b. 1945)

June

- June 12 – Enzo Pastor, Asian V8 race champion (b. 1982)

July

- July 1 – Oscar Yatco, conductor and violinist (b. 1930)

August

- August 3 – Lydia Yu-Jose, leading scholar of political science and Japanese studies at the Ateneo de Manila University (b. 1944)
- August 8 – Leonardo Legaspi, first Filipino rector of UST and former archbishop of Caceres (b. 1935)
- August 16 – Raul Goco, former Solicitor General of the Philippines (b. 1930)
- August 29 – Kurt Bachmann, 1960 Summer Olympics basketball player (b. 1936)

September

- September 1 – Mark Gil, actor (b. 1961)
- September 7 – Raul Gonzalez (Philippines), former Justice Secretary (b. 1930)
- September 19:
  - Francisco Feliciano, national artist (b. 1941)

October

- October 6 – Johnny Midnight (broadcaster), veteran radio broadcaster (b. 1941)
- October 10 – Damiana Eugenio, Philippine folklorist (b. 1921)
- October 11 – Jennifer Laude, transgender and murder victim (b. 1987)
- October 30 – Juan Flavier, former Health Secretary and Senator (b. 1935)

November

- November 21 – Vicente Paterno, former Senator of the Philippines (b. 1925)

December

- December 8 – Martha Cecilia, pocketbook writer (b. 1955)
- December 16 – Abdulmari Asia Imao, sculptor and national artist (b. 1936)
- December 26 – Samson Alcantara, lawyer and 2013 senatorial candidate (b. 1935)
- December 29 – Juanito Remulla, Sr., former Governor of Cavite (b. 1933)

== See also ==
- List of Philippine films of 2014
- List of years in the Philippines
- Timeline of Philippine history
