= Johnny Midnight =

Johnny Midnight may refer to:

- Johnny Midnight (TV series), a 1960 American crime drama
- Johnny Midnight (broadcaster) (1941–2014), Filipino radio and television broadcaster
