= 2014 Ninoy Aquino International Airport bombing plot =

- Date: September 1, 2014
- Cause: Anti-Chinese resentment
- Organised by: United States Allied Freedom Fighters of the East
- Outcome: Plot foiled, multiple arrests

In September 2014, terminal three of Ninoy Aquino International Airport was the target of a foiled bombing plot.

== Plot ==
Three individuals were arrested, and the motivation was initially speculated to be related to Islamist militants. The office building is owned by DMCI Holdings, a company owned by Chinese Filipinos.

== Aftermath ==
Authorities later arrested the leader of the thirteen-year-old organization, a lawyer; previously he was a lawyer for the Moro National Liberation Front. The National Bureau of Investigation stated that the arrest was not related to the bomb plot, but to an "attack" on EDSA in 2004. The "attack" is claimed to be a "protest" by the lawyer, who lost in the 2004 Philippine presidential elections. The lawyer later stated that he did not want his associates to bomb the airport, but to use the explosives on Chinese ships in the Spratly Islands. The lawyer was released on bail.

The lawyer calls his organization "United States Allied Freedom Fighters of the East". Justice Secretary Leila de Lima called the actions of the group "misguided". The Director General of the National Security Council called the group a "dubious organisation led by delusional leaders." The Philippine Armed Forces called the bomb plot "comic relief", while the National Bureau of Investigation did not dismiss the attack.

== Effects ==
The three arrested individuals were charged with illegal possession of explosives. All were represented by a single lawyer, with ties to the Marcos presidency, who claimed that the three are fall guys in a plot by the Aquino Administration to create instability to allow the constitution to be amended so that President Aquino can serve more than one term. The charges were later endorsed by the Department of Justice, but charges of illegal possession of firearms were dropped.

Following the bombing plot, and an unrelated kidnapping of a Chinese teenager, the Chinese Foreign Ministry issued a travel warning advising its nationals not to travel to the Philippines.
