= Johnny Midnight (broadcaster) =

Filipino radio and television broadcaster (1941-2014)

- Born: John William Xeres-Burgos Joseph Jr. March 31, 1941; Bacolod, Negros Occidental, Commonwealth of the Philippines
- Died: October 6, 2014 (aged 73); Manila, Philippines
- Occupation(s): Television journalist, radio host
- Years active: 1969–2014

John William Xeres-Burgos Joseph Jr., also known as Johnny Midnight (March 31, 1941 – October 6, 2014) was a Filipino radio and television broadcaster. He was a pioneer reporter of Radyo Patrol in the 1960s. He was awarded with the Presidential Humanitarian Award of the First Order by then President Ferdinand Marcos due to his work in helping the victims of the 1968 Casiguran earthquake in Binondo, Manila. He died due to prostate cancer on October 6, 2014.

== Filmography ==
=== Radio ===
- Midnight Connection (DZRJ, DZBB)
- Metro Patrol Midnight Connection (2014, DWIZ)

=== Television ===
- Midnight Connection, host (RJTV 29)
- RJTV Interactive News, anchor (RJTV 29)
- Radyo Bandido sa Telebisyon, host (NBN 4 - now PTV 4)
