= Pogonomyrmex desertorum =

Scientific classification
- Kingdom: Animalia
- Phylum: Arthropoda
- Class: Insecta
- Order: Hymenoptera
- Family: Formicidae
- Subfamily: Myrmicinae
- Tribe: Pogonomyrmecini
- Genus: Pogonomyrmex
- Species: P. desertorum

Binomial name
- Pogonomyrmex desertorum Wheeler, 1902

Species of ant

Pogonomyrmex desertorum, the large seed harvesting ant, is a species of harvester ant native to Mexico, the southwestern United States, and possibly Florida and Colorado.

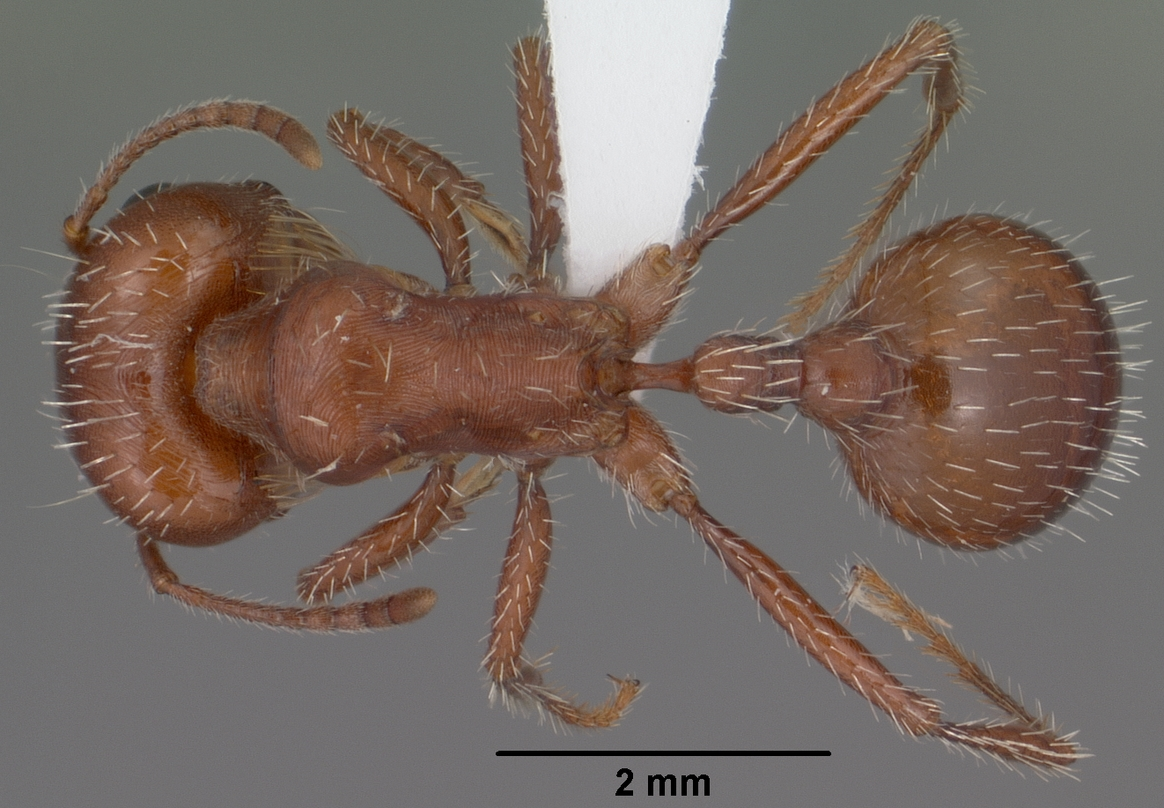
Large seed harvesting ant, Pogonomyrmex desertorum

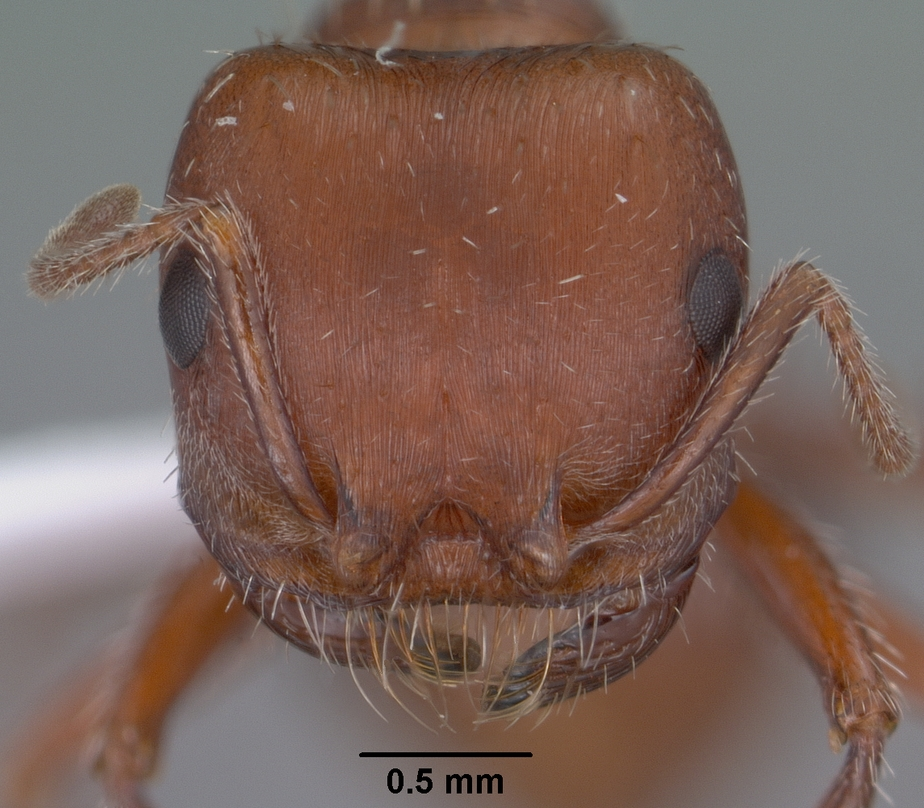
Large seed harvesting ant, Pogonomyrmex desertorum
