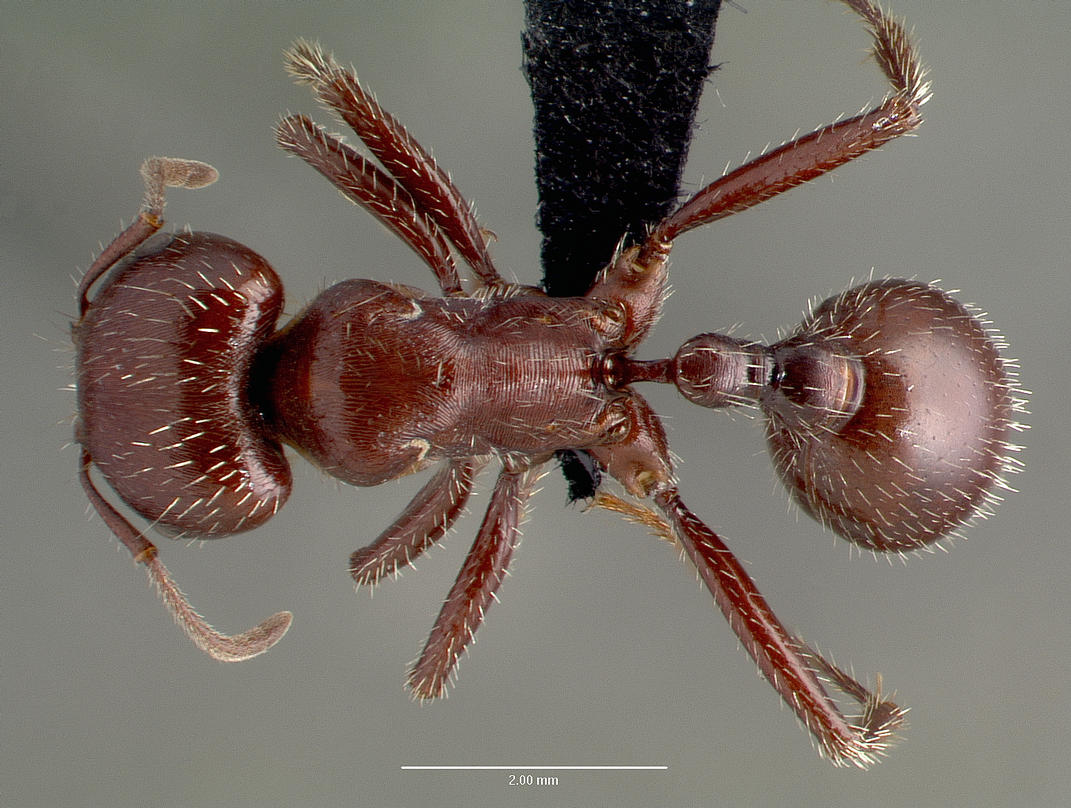

Scientific classification
- Kingdom: Animalia
- Phylum: Arthropoda
- Class: Insecta
- Order: Hymenoptera
- Family: Formicidae
- Subfamily: Myrmicinae
- Tribe: Pogonomyrmecini
- Genus: Pogonomyrmex
- Species: P. apache

Binomial name
- Pogonomyrmex apache Wheeler, 1902

= Pogonomyrmex apache =

Species of ant

Pogonomyrmex apache is a species of ant in the family Formicidae.

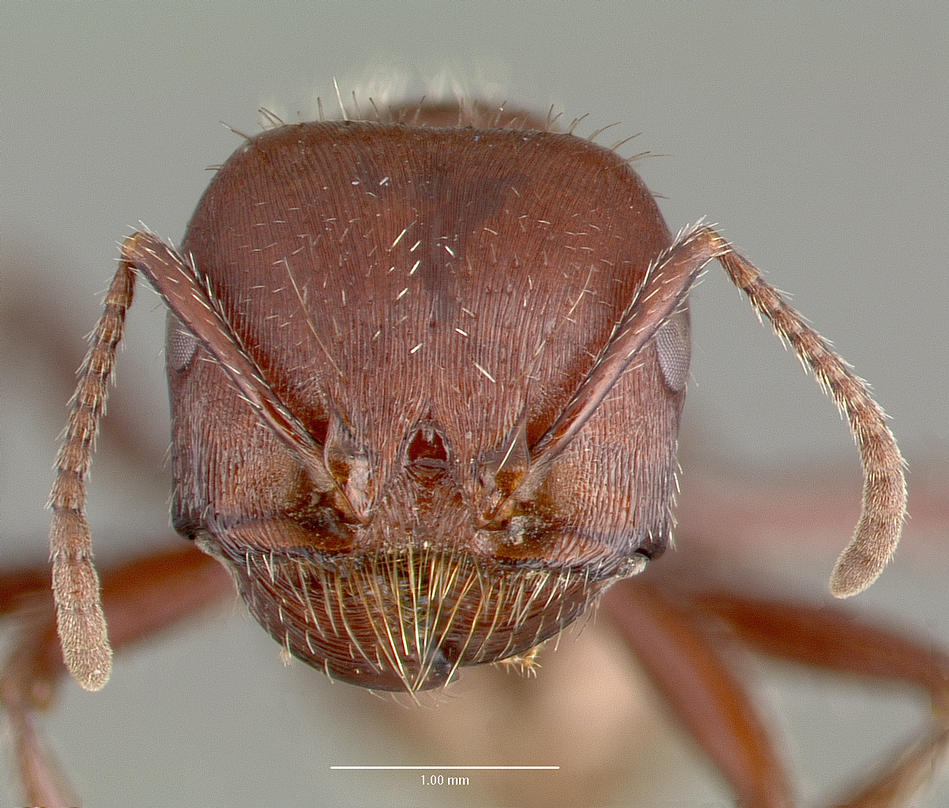

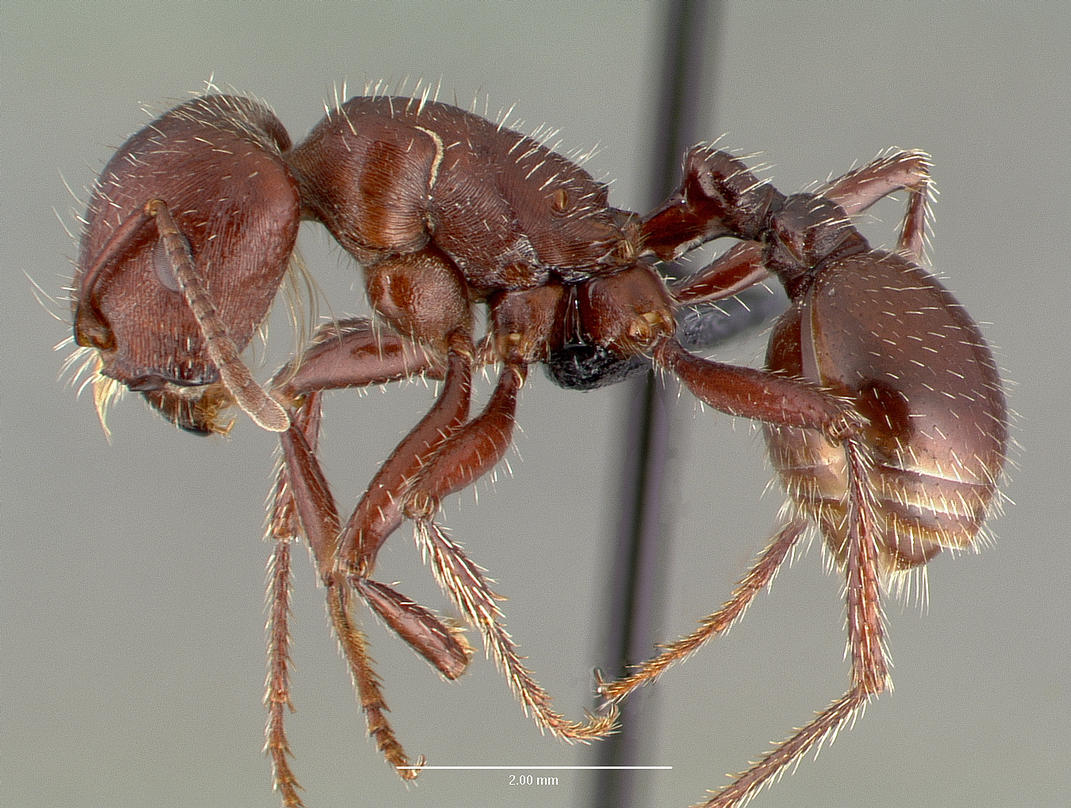
