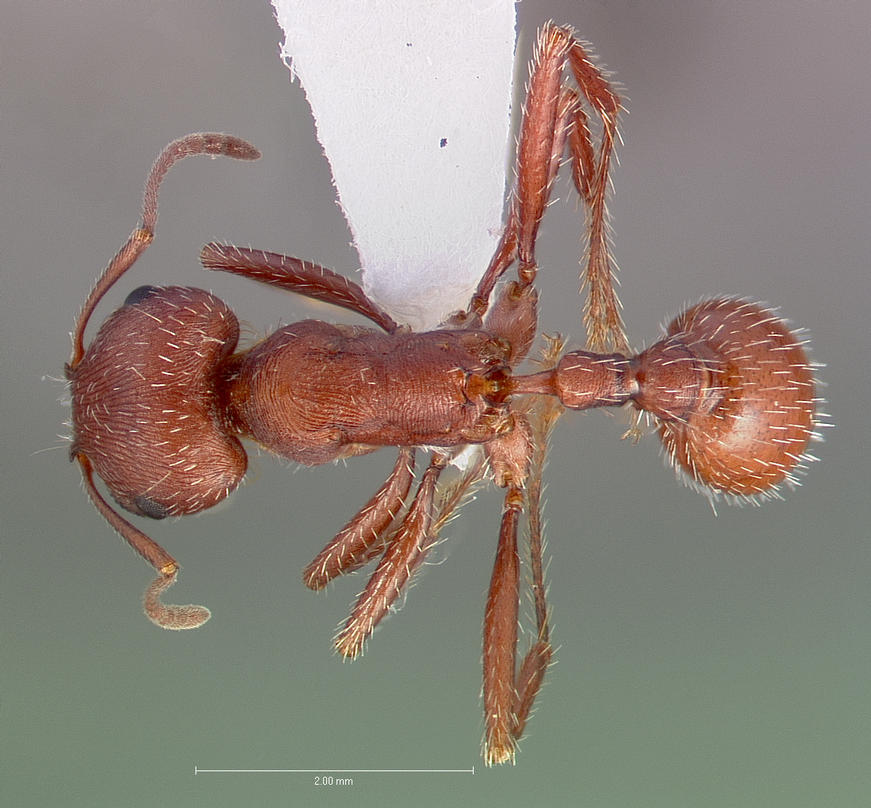

Scientific classification
- Domain: Eukaryota
- Kingdom: Animalia
- Phylum: Arthropoda
- Class: Insecta
- Order: Hymenoptera
- Family: Formicidae
- Subfamily: Myrmicinae
- Tribe: Pogonomyrmecini
- Genus: Pogonomyrmex
- Species: P. salinus

Binomial name
- Pogonomyrmex salinus Olsen, 1934

= Pogonomyrmex salinus =

Species of ant

Pogonomyrmex salinus is a species of ant in the family Formicidae.

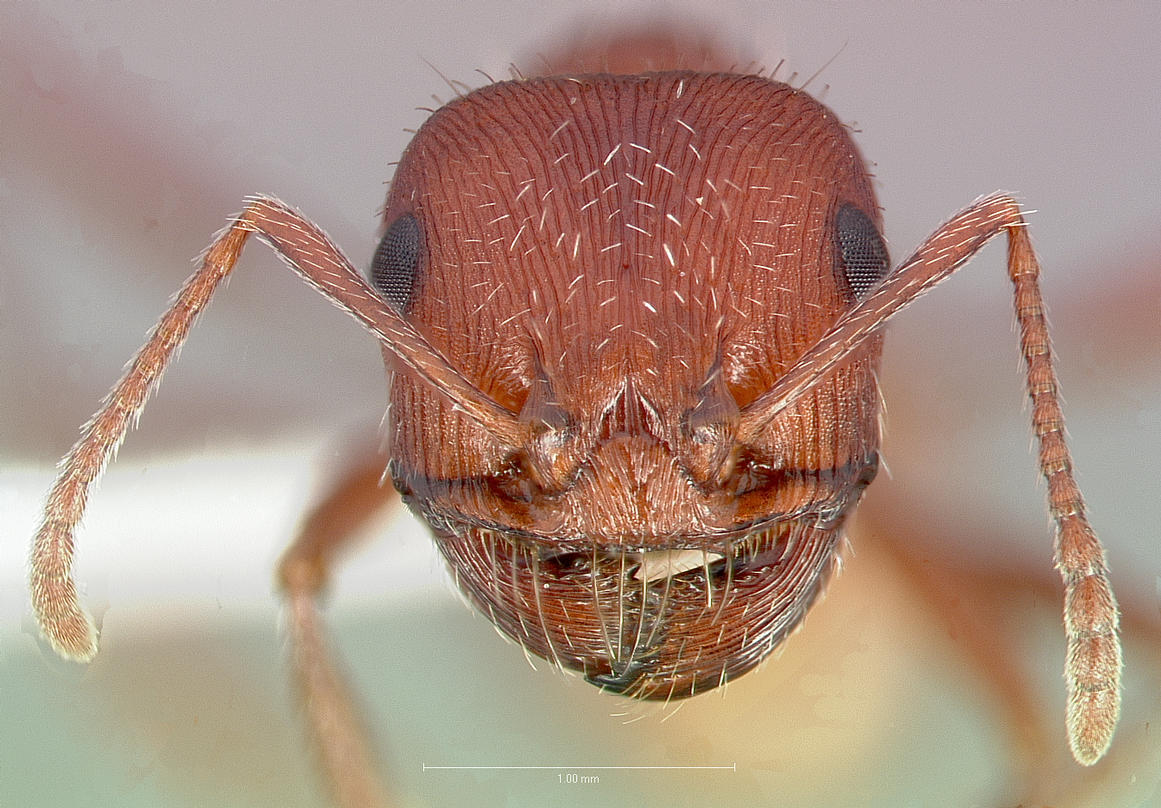

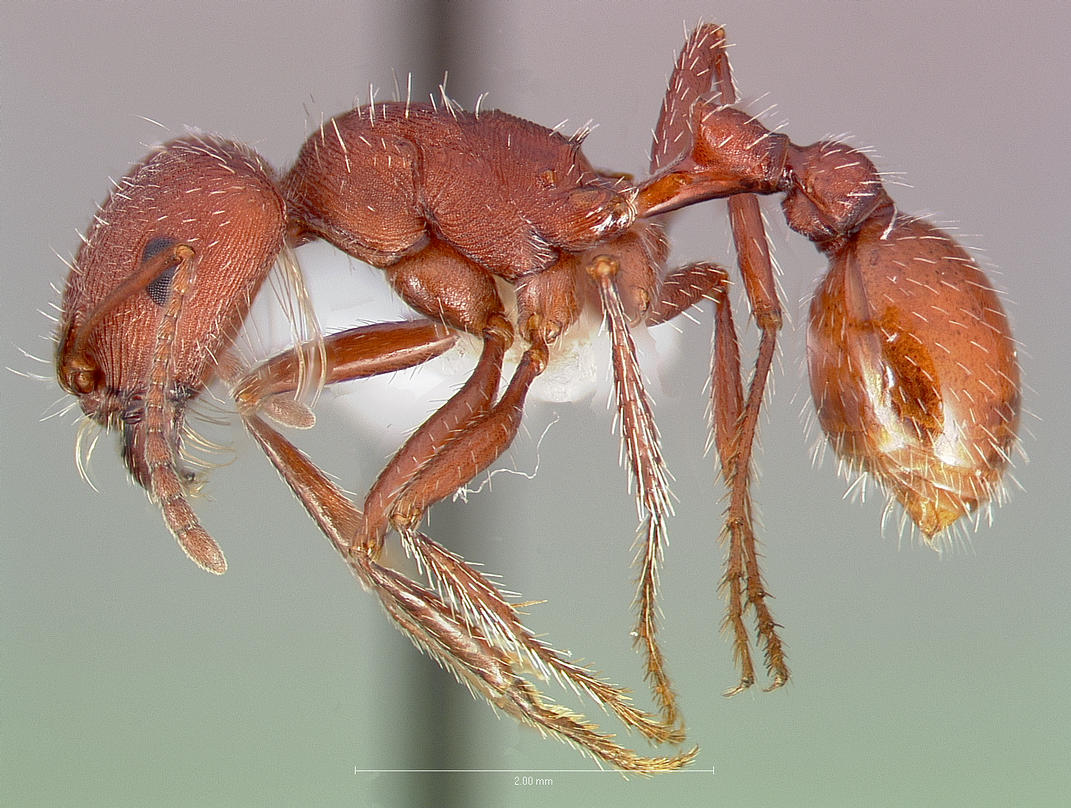
