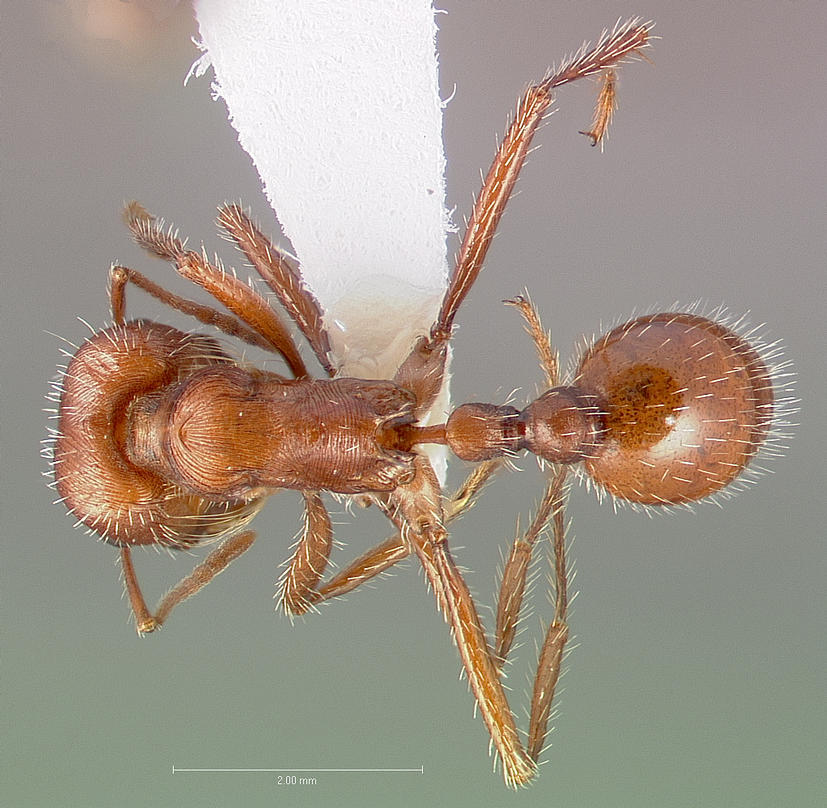

Scientific classification
- Kingdom: Animalia
- Phylum: Arthropoda
- Clade: Pancrustacea
- Class: Insecta
- Order: Hymenoptera
- Family: Formicidae
- Subfamily: Myrmicinae
- Genus: Pogonomyrmex
- Species: P. subnitidus

Binomial name
- Pogonomyrmex subnitidus Emery, 1895

= Pogonomyrmex subnitidus =

Species of ant

Pogonomyrmex subnitidus is a species of harvester ant in the subfamily Myrmicinae native to California, Baja California, Nevada, Utah, and possibly Arizona, Oklahoma, Nuevo Leon, and New Hampshire.

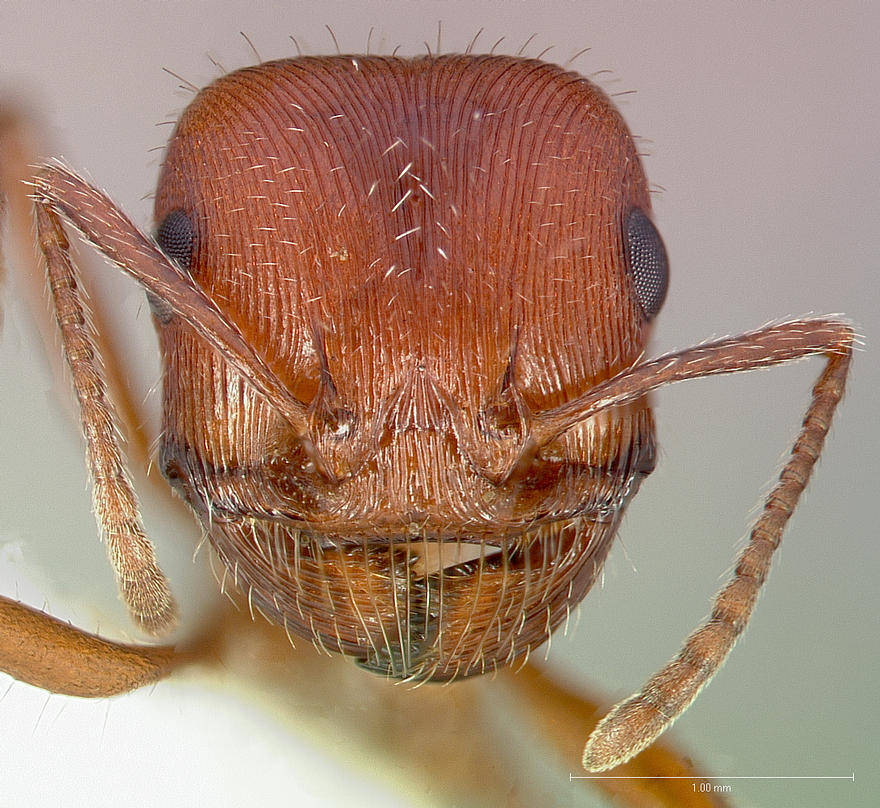

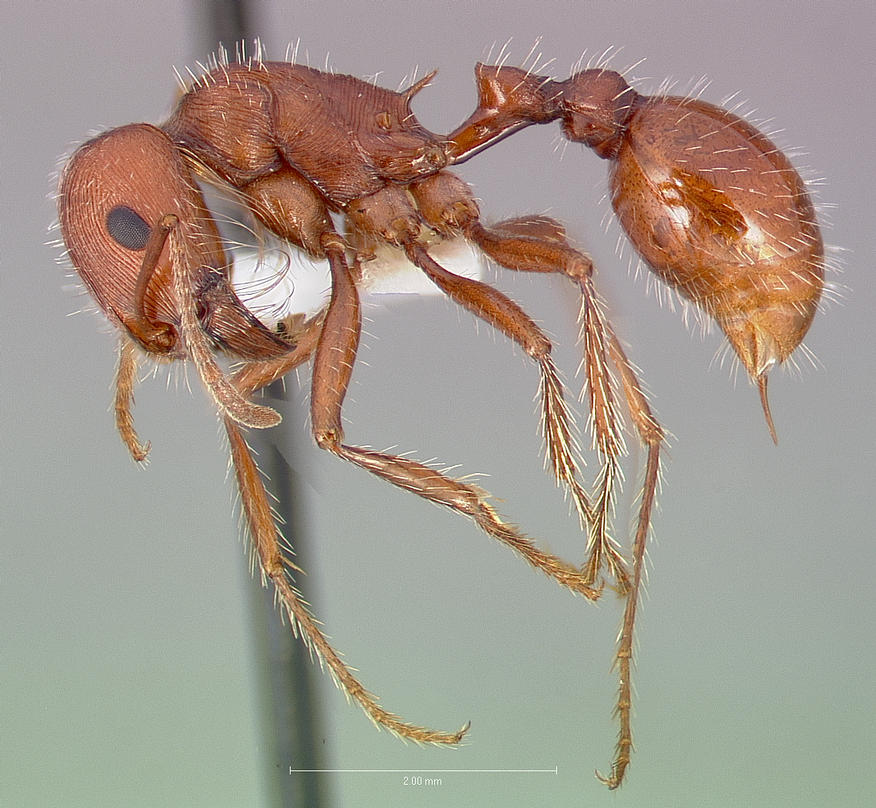
