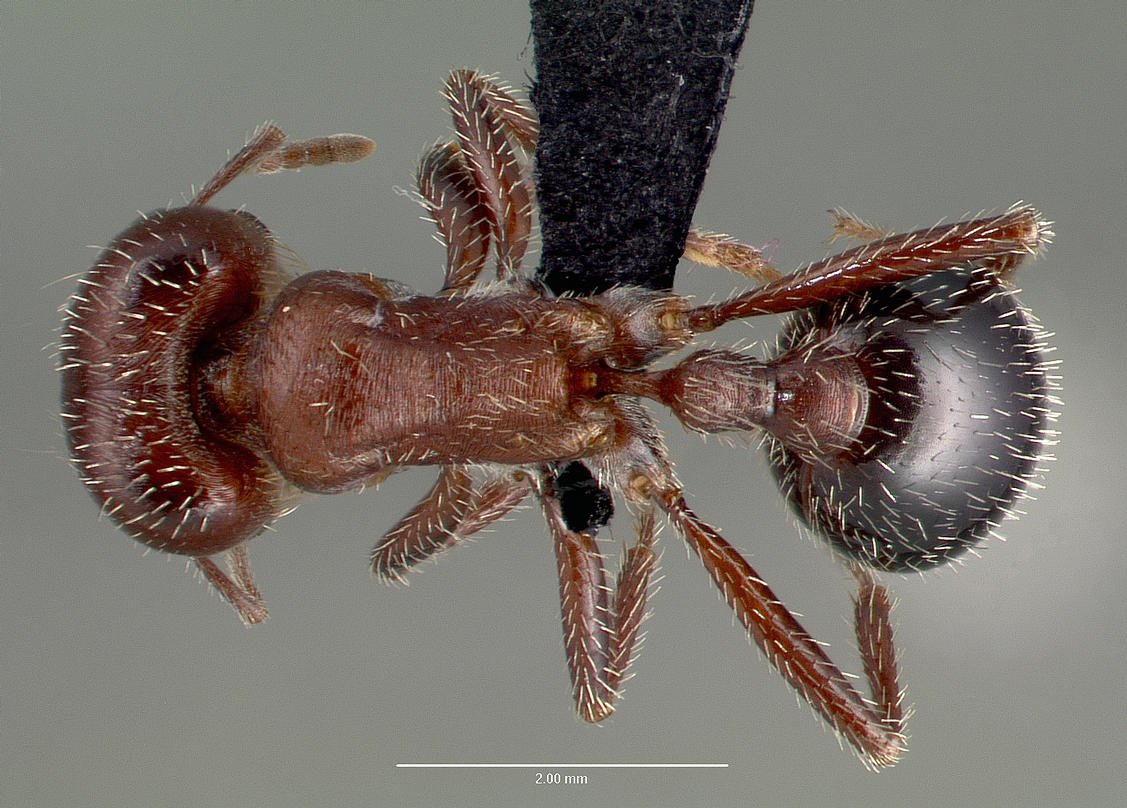

Scientific classification
- Domain: Eukaryota
- Kingdom: Animalia
- Phylum: Arthropoda
- Class: Insecta
- Order: Hymenoptera
- Family: Formicidae
- Subfamily: Myrmicinae
- Genus: Pogonomyrmex
- Species: P. bicolor

Binomial name
- Pogonomyrmex bicolor Cole, 1968

= Pogonomyrmex bicolor =

Species of ant

Pogonomyrmex bicolor, the bicolored harvester ant, is a species of harvester ant native to Arizona, Sonora, Chihuahua, and Sinaloa.

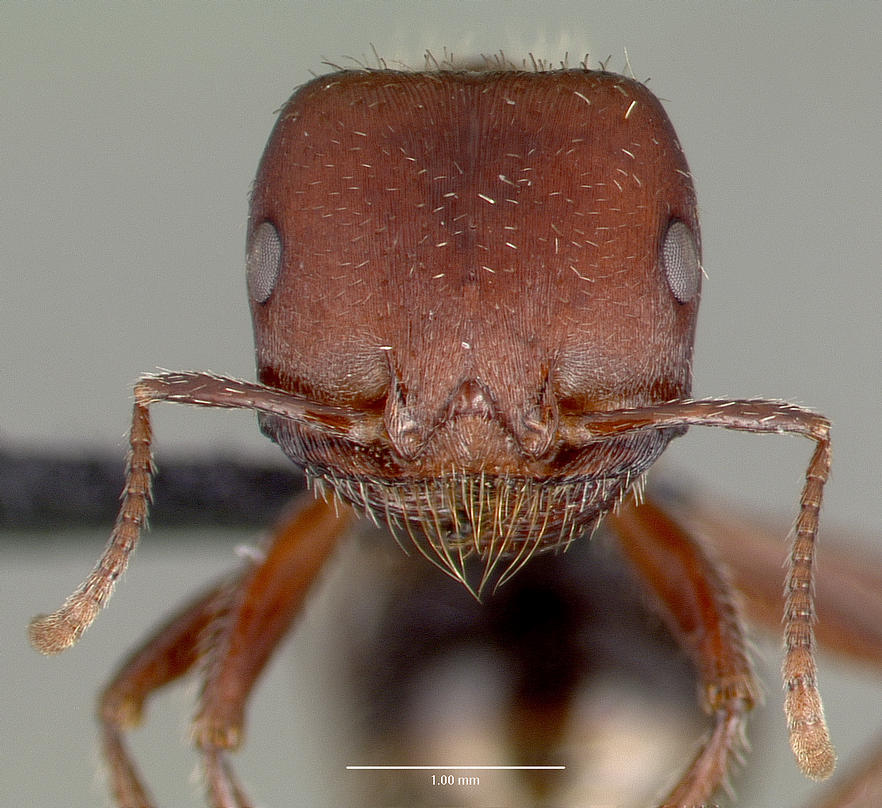
Bicolored harvester ant, Pogonomyrmex bicolor

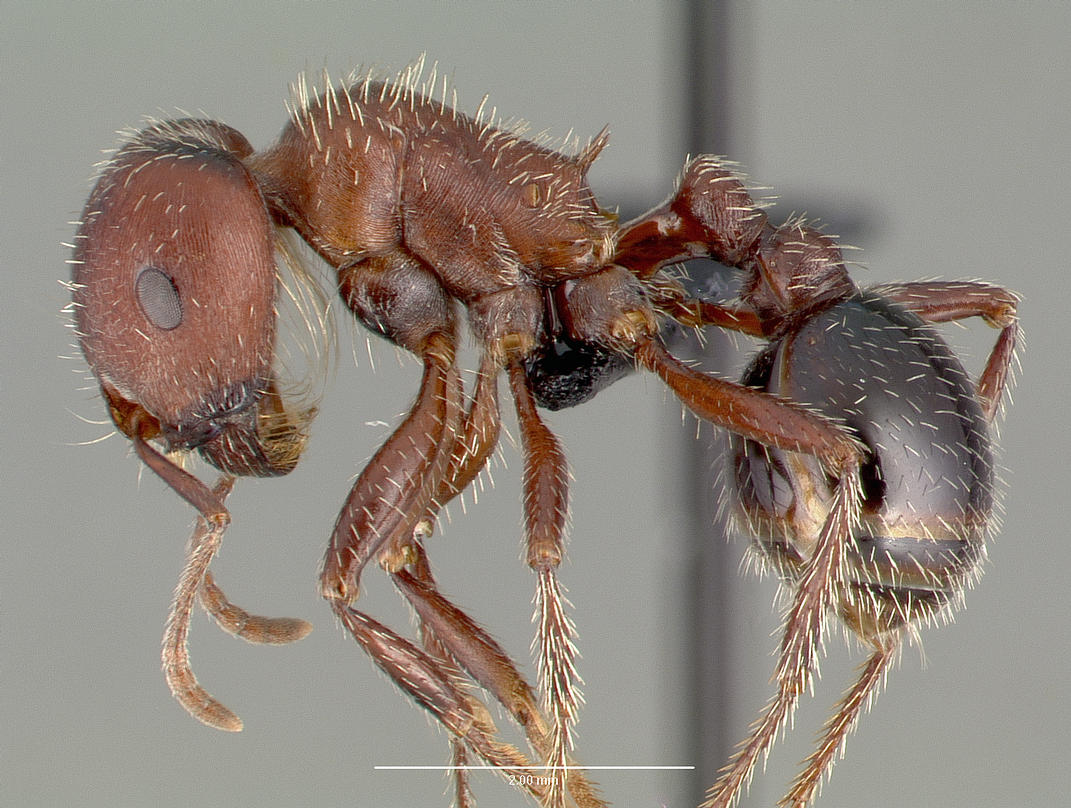
Bicolored harvester ant, Pogonomyrmex bicolor
