= Masoncus =

Scientific classification
- Kingdom: Animalia
- Phylum: Arthropoda
- Subphylum: Chelicerata
- Class: Arachnida
- Order: Araneae
- Infraorder: Araneomorphae
- Family: Linyphiidae
- Genus: Masoncus; Chamberlin, 1949

Type species
- M. arienus Chamberlin, 1949

Species
- 4, see text

Genus of spiders

Masoncus is a genus of North American dwarf spiders that was first described by Ralph Vary Chamberlin in 1949.

== Species ==
As of May 2019 it contains four species, found in Canada and the United States:

- Masoncus arienus Chamberlin, 1949 (type) – USA,
- Masoncus conspectus (Gertsch & Davis, 1936) – USA
- Masoncus dux Chamberlin, 1949 – Canada
- Masoncus pogonophilus Cushing, 1995 – USA. Known myrmecophilic association with Pogonomyrmex badius, this spider lives in the nest and feeds on springtails.
