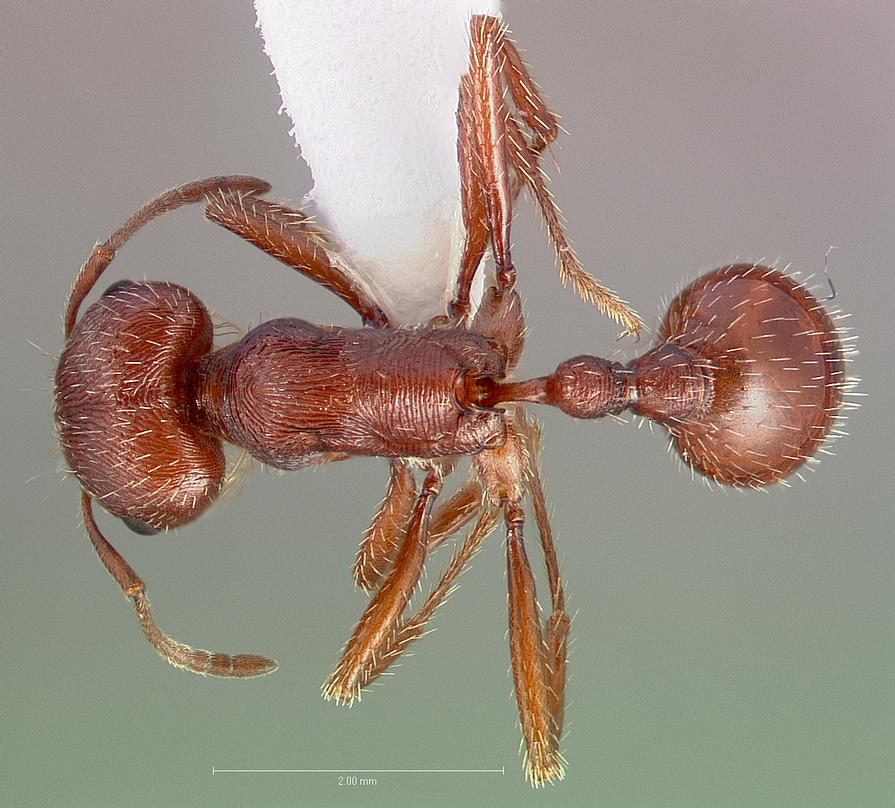

Scientific classification
- Kingdom: Animalia
- Phylum: Arthropoda
- Clade: Pancrustacea
- Class: Insecta
- Order: Hymenoptera
- Family: Formicidae
- Subfamily: Myrmicinae
- Genus: Pogonomyrmex
- Species: P. subdentatus

Binomial name
- Pogonomyrmex subdentatus Mayr, 1870

= Pogonomyrmex subdentatus =

Species of ant

Pogonomyrmex subdentatus is a species of harvester ant native to California, Nevada, and possibly Oregon and Colorado.

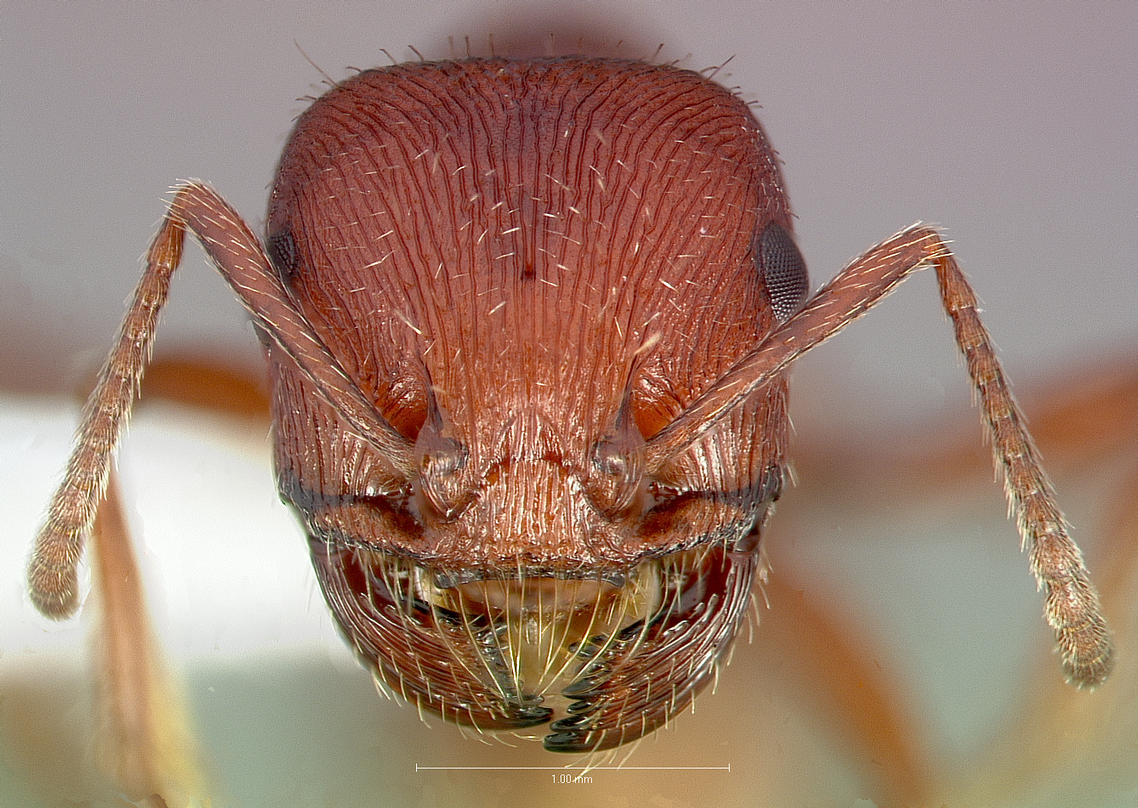

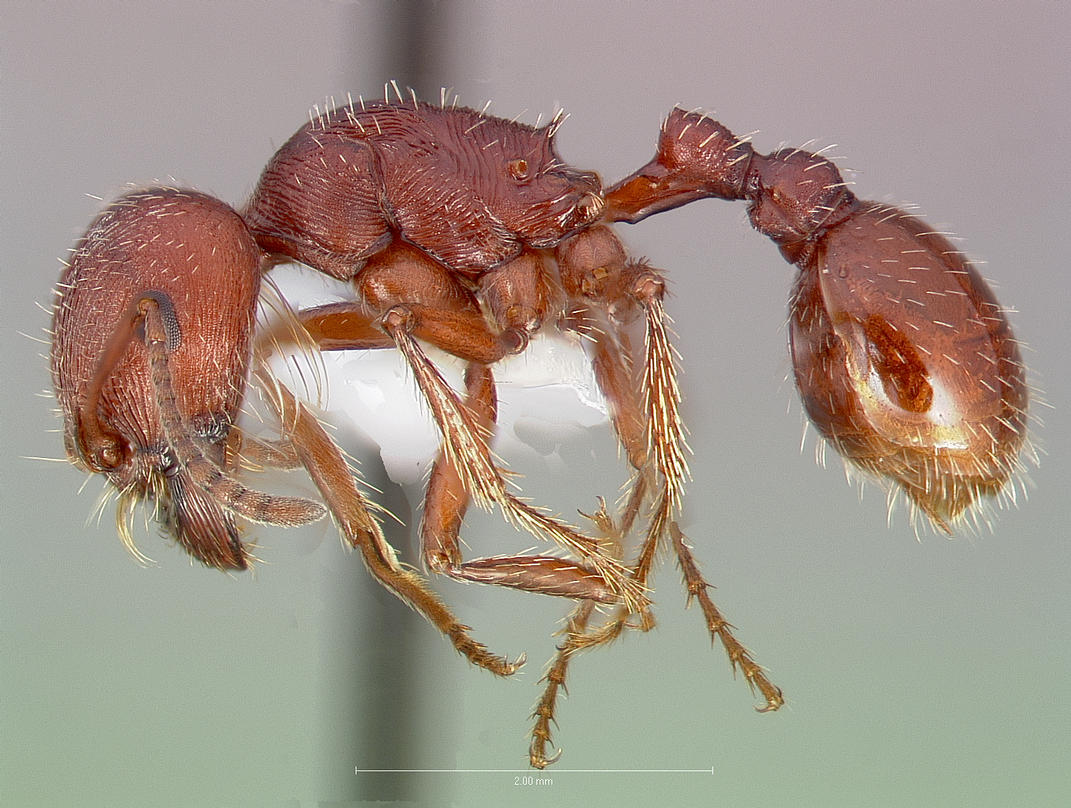
