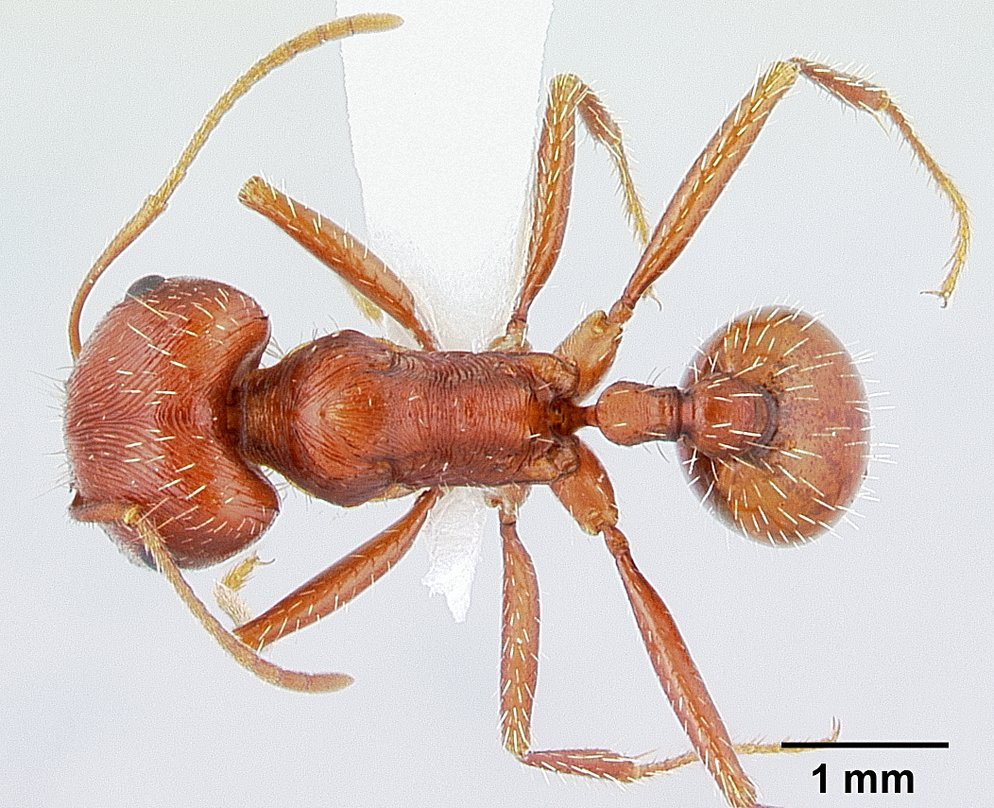

Scientific classification
- Kingdom: Animalia
- Phylum: Arthropoda
- Class: Insecta
- Order: Hymenoptera
- Family: Formicidae
- Subfamily: Myrmicinae
- Genus: Pogonomyrmex
- Species: P. anzensis

Binomial name
- Pogonomyrmex anzensis Cole, 1968

= Pogonomyrmex anzensis =

Species of ant

Pogonomyrmex anzensis, the Anza desert harvester ant, is a species of harvester ant endemic to the Anza-Borrego Desert State Park and surrounding areas in Southern California.

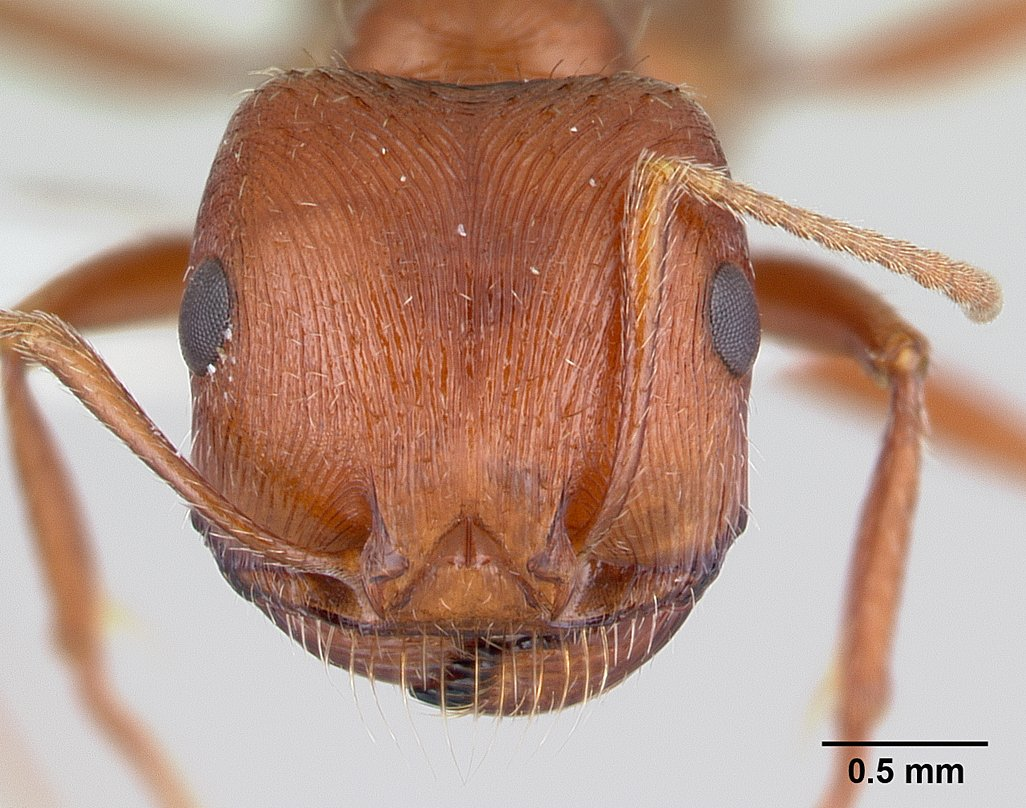
Anza desert harvester, Pogonomyrmex anzensis
