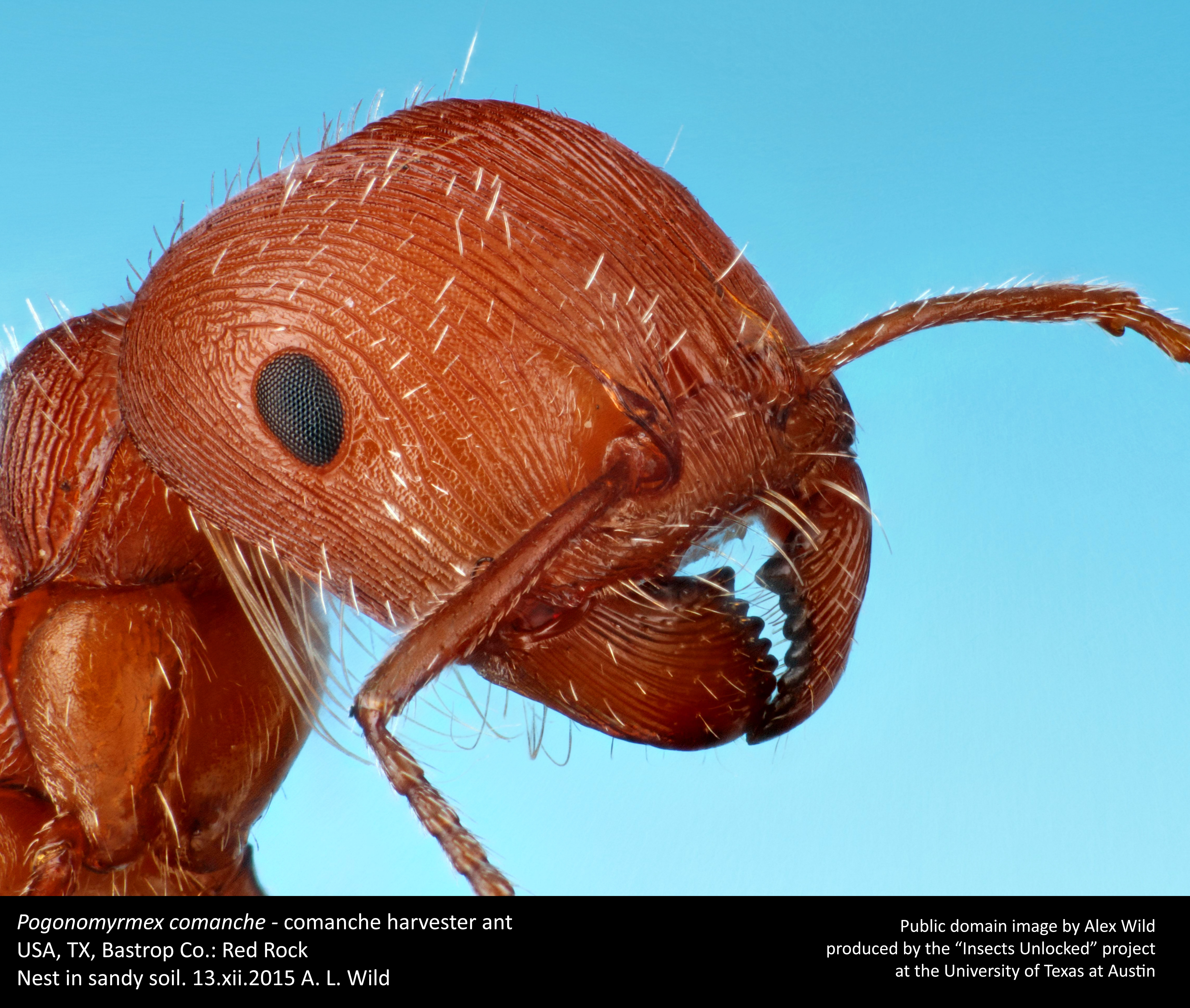

Scientific classification
- Kingdom: Animalia
- Phylum: Arthropoda
- Class: Insecta
- Order: Hymenoptera
- Family: Formicidae
- Subfamily: Myrmicinae
- Tribe: Pogonomyrmecini
- Genus: Pogonomyrmex
- Species: P. comanche

Binomial name
- Pogonomyrmex comanche Wheeler, 1902

= Pogonomyrmex comanche =

Species of ant

Pogonomyrmex comanche, the Comanche harvester ant, is a species of ant in the family Formicidae.

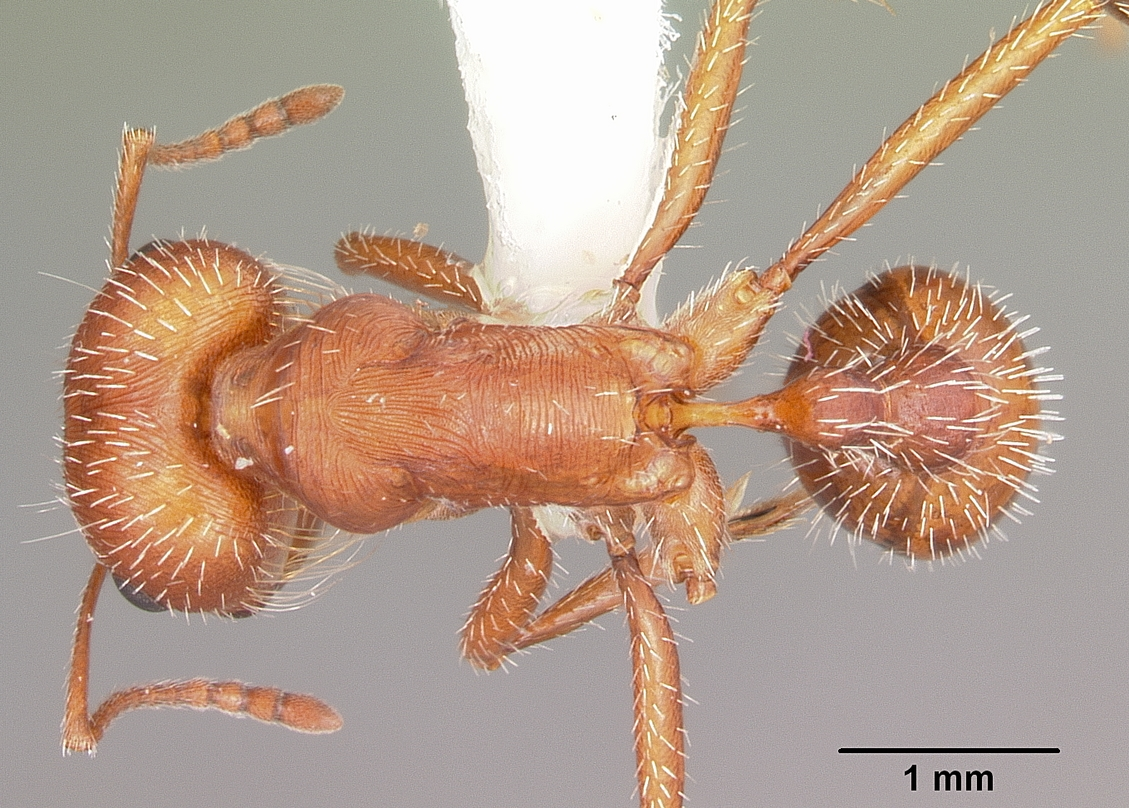
Comanche harvester ant, Pogonomyrmex comanche

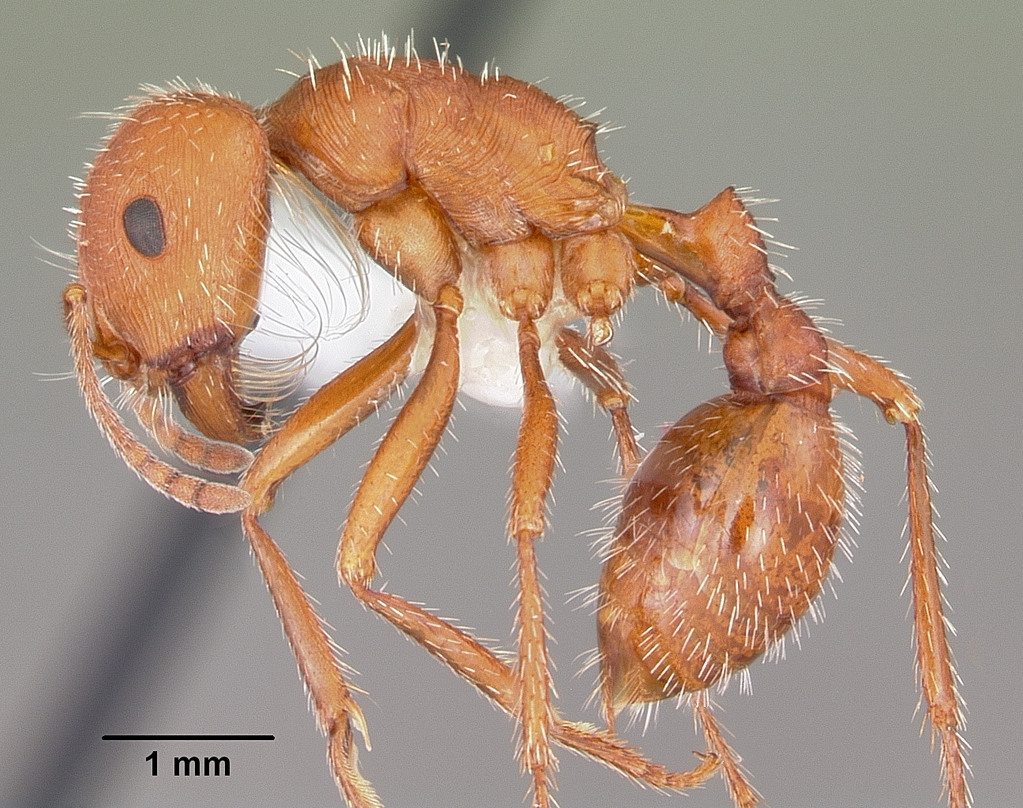
Comanche harvester ant, Pogonomyrmex comanche
