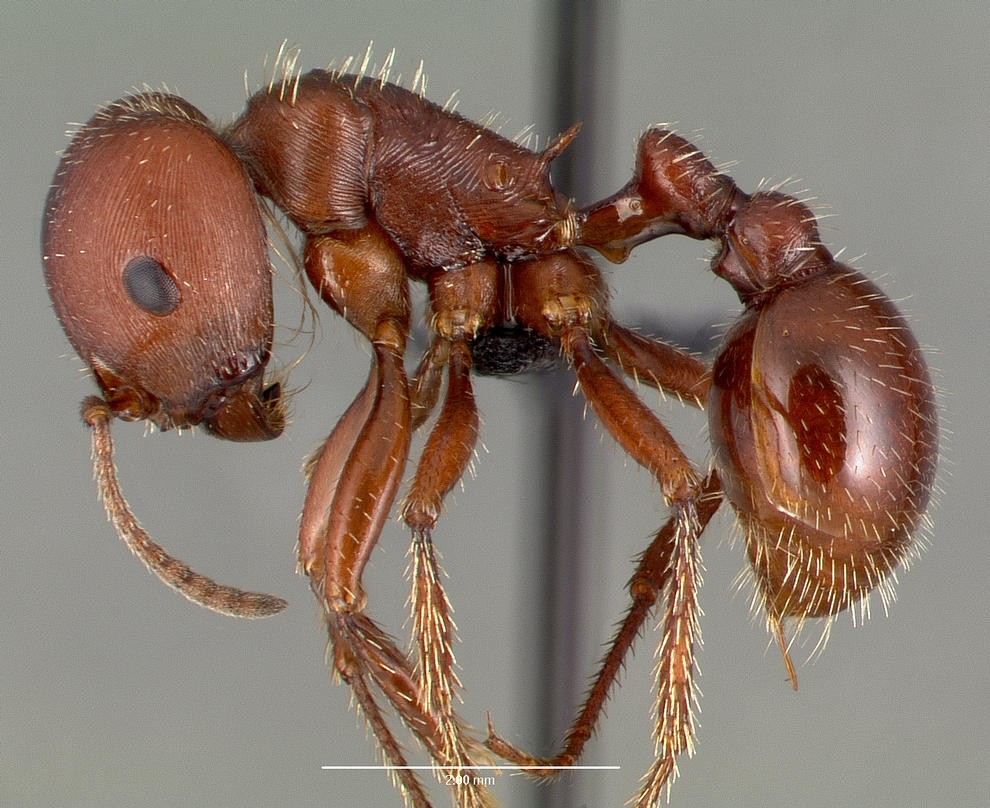
- Pogonomyrmex barbatus worker

Scientific classification
- Kingdom: Animalia
- Phylum: Arthropoda
- Class: Insecta
- Order: Hymenoptera
- Family: Formicidae
- Subfamily: Myrmicinae
- Tribe: Pogonomyrmecini
- Genus: Pogonomyrmex; Mayr, 1868

Type species
- Formica badia Latreille, 1802

Diversity
- 69 species

Synonyms
- Ephebomyrmex Wheeler, 1902; Forelomyrmex Wheeler, 1913; Janetia Forel, 1899

= Pogonomyrmex =

Genus of ants

Pogonomyrmex is a genus of harvester ants, occurring primarily in the deserts of North, Central, and South America, with three endemic species from Haiti.

== Description ==
The genus name originated from the Greek language and refers to a beard-like structure, the psammophore, below the head (Greek πώγων/pōgōn, "beard" + μύρμηξ/murmēx, "ant"), which can be found in most species of the subgenus sensu stricto. The psammophore is used for gathering small seeds, helping to increase the efficiency of transportation of fine sand and pebbles during nest construction, or to carry eggs. However, this structure is missing in species of the subgenus Ephebomyrmex (Greek ἔφηβος/ephēbos, "beardless lad"), and these species generally have smaller individuals and colonies.

== Venom ==
Pogonomyrmex (sensu stricto) workers have the most toxic venom documented in any insects, with Pogonomyrmex maricopa being the most toxic tested thus far. It has an LD_{50} of only 0.12 mg/kg, compared to western honey bee venom, at 2.8 mg/kg, and comparable to cobra venom. The venom is presumed to be an antivertebrate defense, specifically against predators that have evolved to selectively feed on them such as horned lizards. Very few insects have had the toxicity of their venoms formally tested, and other insects likely have more potent venoms.

== Nests ==
These ants dig very deep nests with many underground chambers in which they keep seeds, from which they derive food for their larvae. The areas around most Pogonomyrmex (sensu stricto) nests tend to be utterly devoid of vegetation, and are easily seen from a distance.

== Predation ==
In addition to horned lizards, predatory wasps in the genus Clypeadon feed only on Pogonomyrmex workers, paralyzing them with their venom, and carrying them back to a burrow where they will serve as food for the wasp's larva.

== Species ==
As of 2014, there are 69 extant and 1 fossil species in the genus.

- Pogonomyrmex abdominalis Santschi, 1929
- Pogonomyrmex andinus Kusnezov, 1951
- Pogonomyrmex anergismus Cole, 1954
- Pogonomyrmex angustus Mayr, 1870
- Pogonomyrmex anzensis Cole, 1968
- Pogonomyrmex apache Wheeler, 1902
- Pogonomyrmex atratus Santschi, 1922
- Pogonomyrmex badius (Latreille, 1802)
- Pogonomyrmex barbatus (Smith, 1858)
- Pogonomyrmex bicolor Cole, 1968
- Pogonomyrmex bigbendensis Francke & Merickel, 1982
- Pogonomyrmex bispinosus (Spinola, 1851)
- Pogonomyrmex brevibarbis Emery, 1906
- Pogonomyrmex brevispinosus Cole, 1968
- Pogonomyrmex bruchi Forel, 1913
- Pogonomyrmex californicus (Buckley, 1866)
- Pogonomyrmex carbonarius Mayr, 1868
- Pogonomyrmex catanlilensis Gallardo, 1931
- Pogonomyrmex coarctatus Mayr, 1868
- Pogonomyrmex colei Snelling, 1982
- Pogonomyrmex comanche Wheeler, 1902
- Pogonomyrmex cunicularius Mayr, 1887
- Pogonomyrmex desertorum Wheeler, 1902
- †Pogonomyrmex fossilis Carpenter, 1930
- Pogonomyrmex guatemaltecus Wheeler, 1914
- Pogonomyrmex hoelldobleri Johnson, Overson & Moreau, 2013
- Pogonomyrmex huachucanus Wheeler, 1914
- Pogonomyrmex humerotumidus Vásquez-Bolaños & Mackay, 2004
- Pogonomyrmex imberbiculus Wheeler, 1902
- Pogonomyrmex inermis Forel, 1914
- Pogonomyrmex kusnezovi Cuezzo & Claver, 2009
- Pogonomyrmex laevigatus Santschi, 1921
- Pogonomyrmex laevinodis Snelling, 1982
- Pogonomyrmex laticeps Santschi, 1922
- Pogonomyrmex lobatus Santschi, 1921
- Pogonomyrmex longibarbis Gallardo, 1931
- Pogonomyrmex magnacanthus Cole, 1968
- Pogonomyrmex marcusi Kusnezov, 1951
- Pogonomyrmex maricopa Wheeler, 1914
- Pogonomyrmex mayri Forel, 1899
- Pogonomyrmex mendozanus Cuezzo & Claver, 2009
- Pogonomyrmex meridionalis Kusnezov, 1951
- Pogonomyrmex micans Forel, 1914
- Pogonomyrmex mohavensis Johnson & Overson, 2009
- Pogonomyrmex montanus MacKay, 1980
- Pogonomyrmex naegelii Emery, 1878
- Pogonomyrmex occidentalis (Cresson, 1865)
- Pogonomyrmex odoratus Kusnezov, 1949
- Pogonomyrmex pima Wheeler, 1909
- Pogonomyrmex pronotalis Santschi, 1922
- Pogonomyrmex rastratus Mayr, 1868
- Pogonomyrmex rugosus Emery, 1895
- Pogonomyrmex salinus Olsen, 1934
- Pogonomyrmex saucius Wheeler & Mann, 1914
- Pogonomyrmex schmitti Forel, 1901
- Pogonomyrmex snellingi Taber, 1998
- Pogonomyrmex stefani Lattke, 2006
- Pogonomyrmex striatinodus Fernández & Palacio, 1998
- Pogonomyrmex subdentatus Mayr, 1870
- Pogonomyrmex subnitidus Emery, 1895
- Pogonomyrmex sylvestris Lattke, 1991
- Pogonomyrmex tenuipubens Santschi, 1936
- Pogonomyrmex tenuispinus Forel, 1914
- Pogonomyrmex texanus Francke & Merickel, 1982
- Pogonomyrmex theresiae Forel, 1899
- Pogonomyrmex uruguayensis Mayr, 1887
- Pogonomyrmex variabilis Santschi, 1916
- Pogonomyrmex vermiculatus Emery, 1906
- Pogonomyrmex wheeleri Olsen, 1934

== Gallery ==
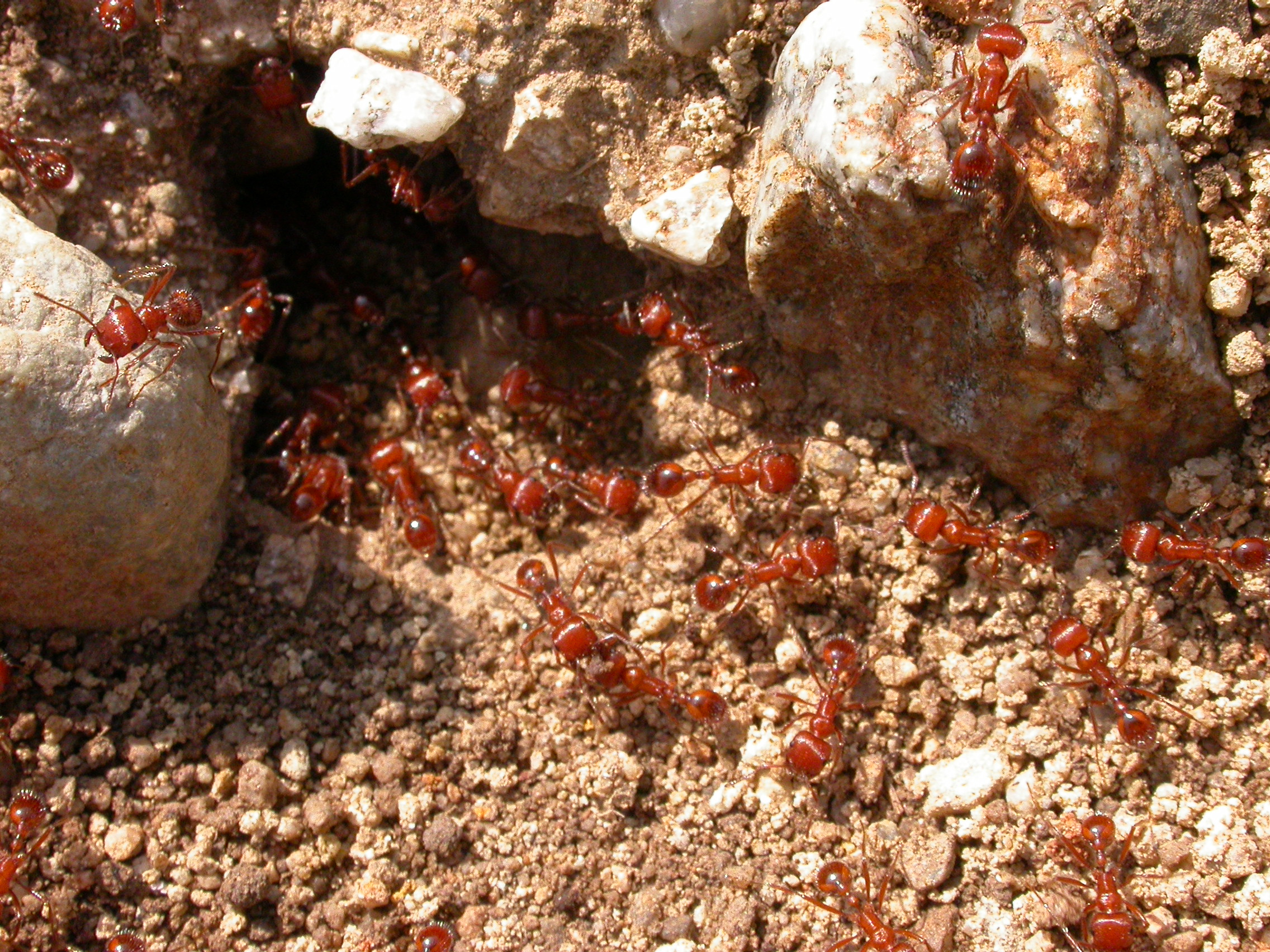
P. californicus

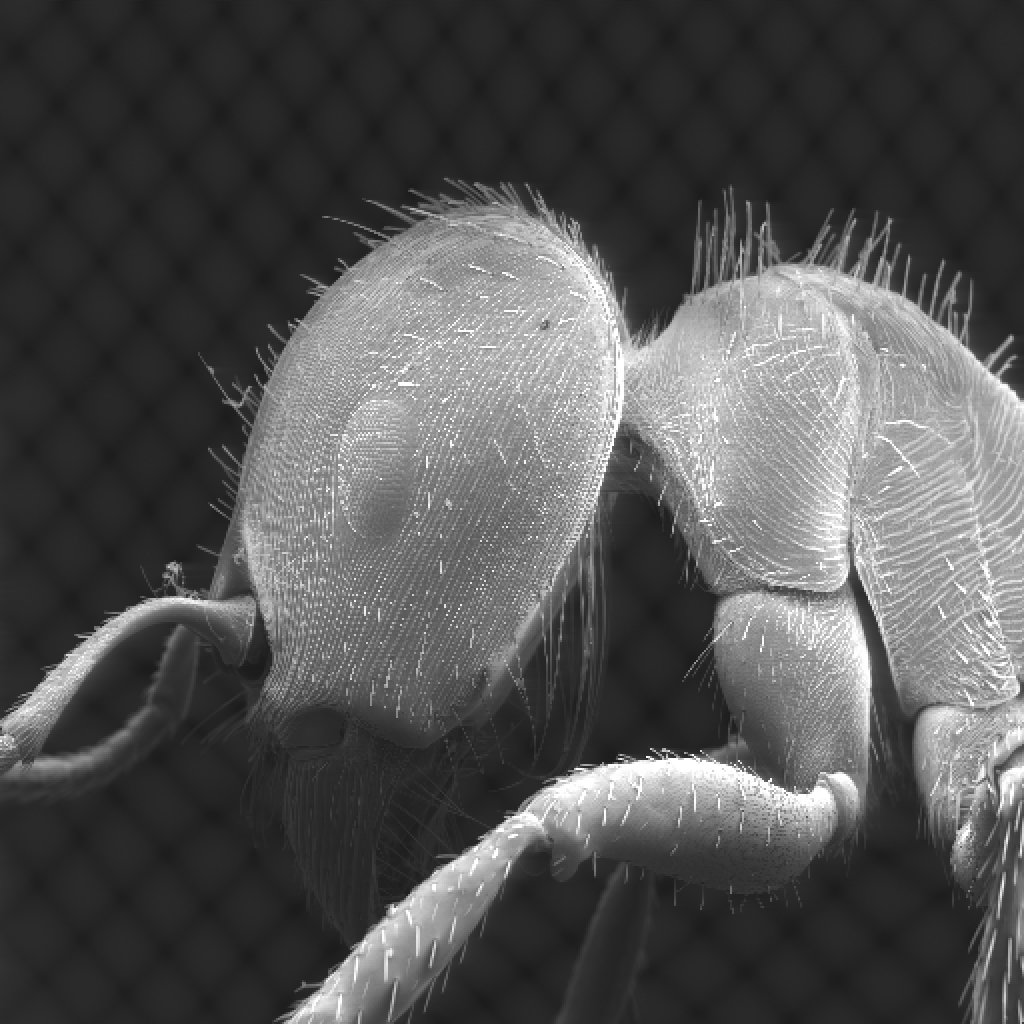
P. barbatus with psammophore visible

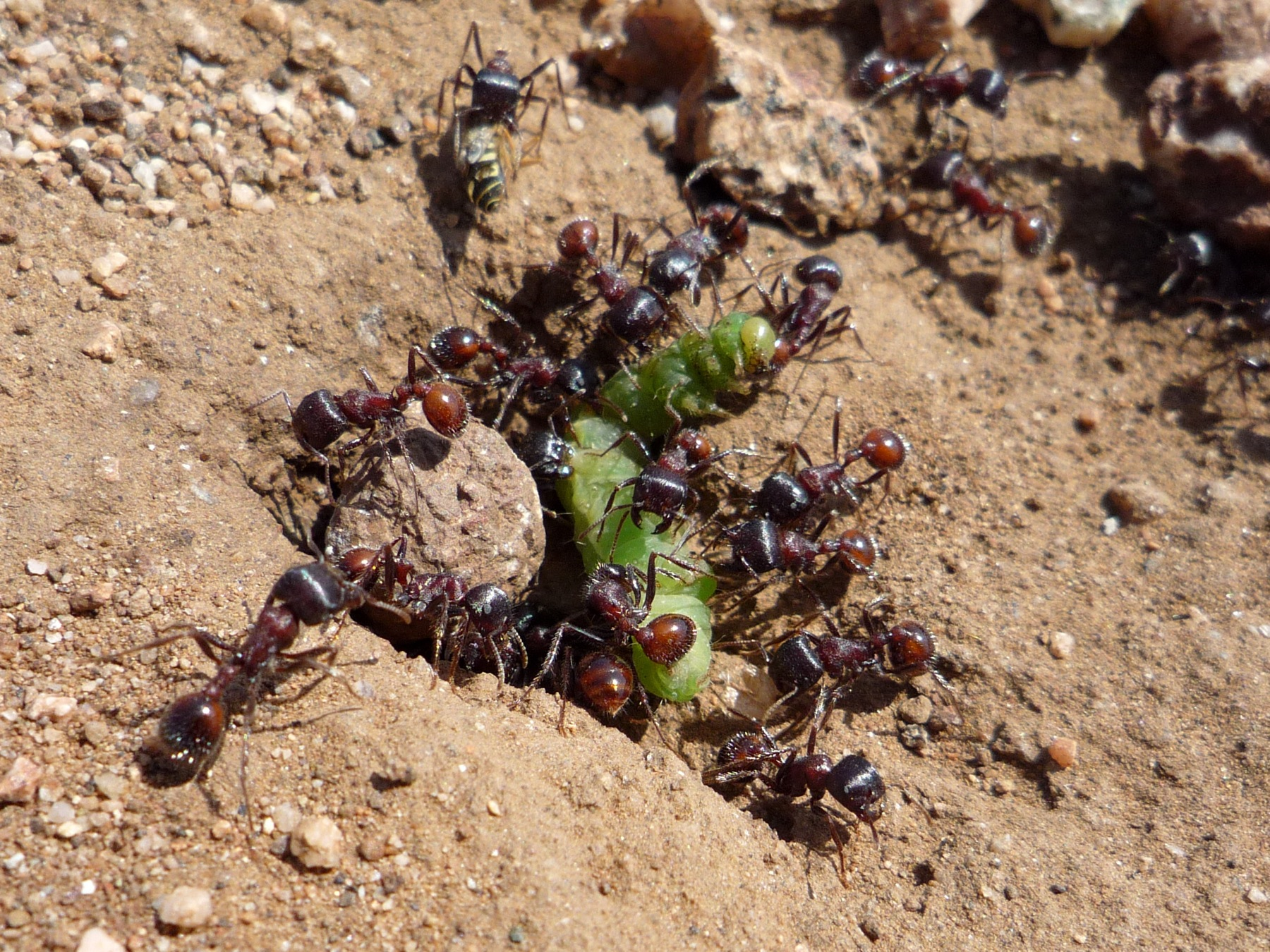
Pogonomyrmex collecting food item

Larvae of P. barbatus
