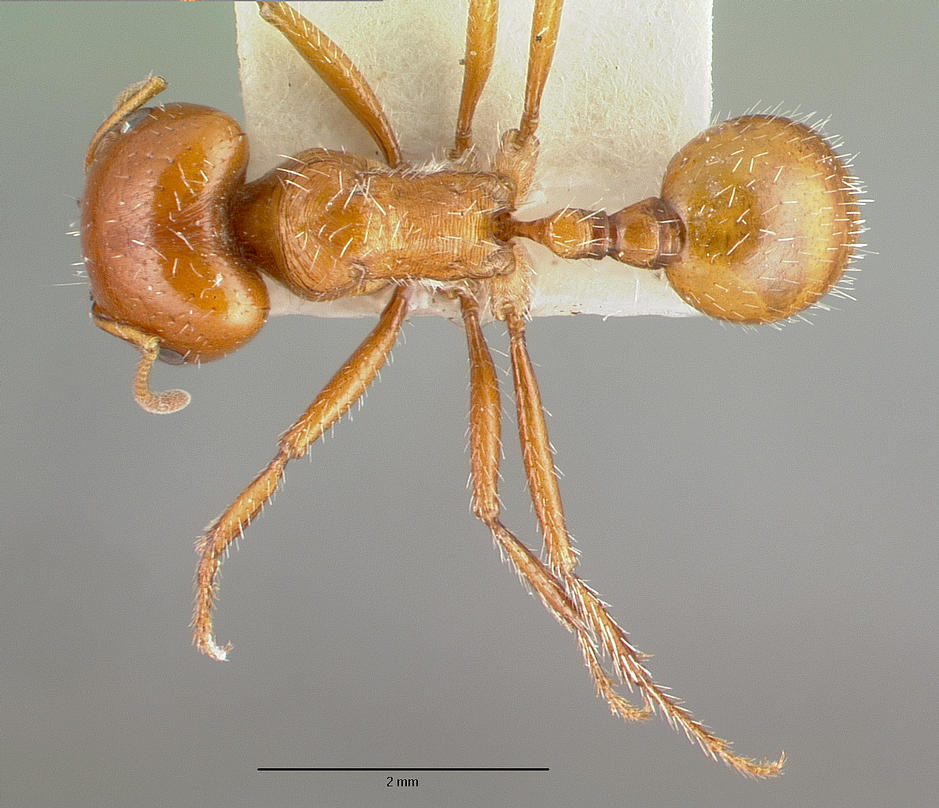

Scientific classification
- Domain: Eukaryota
- Kingdom: Animalia
- Phylum: Arthropoda
- Class: Insecta
- Order: Hymenoptera
- Family: Formicidae
- Subfamily: Myrmicinae
- Genus: Pogonomyrmex
- Species: P. bigbendensis

Binomial name
- Pogonomyrmex bigbendensis Francke & Merickel, 1982

= Pogonomyrmex bigbendensis =

Species of ant

Pogonomyrmex bigbendensis is a species of ant in the family Formicidae.

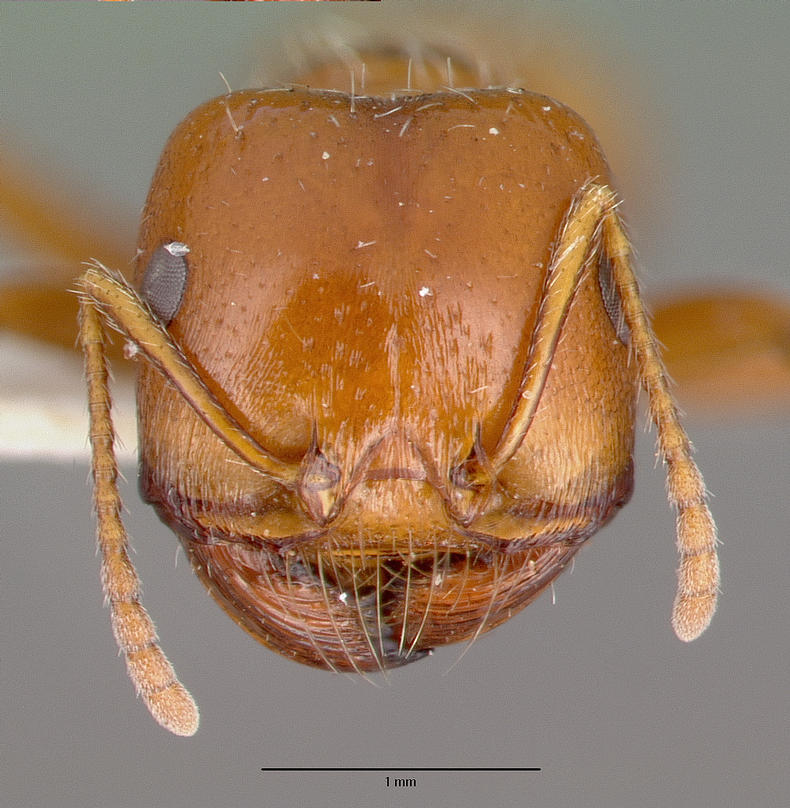

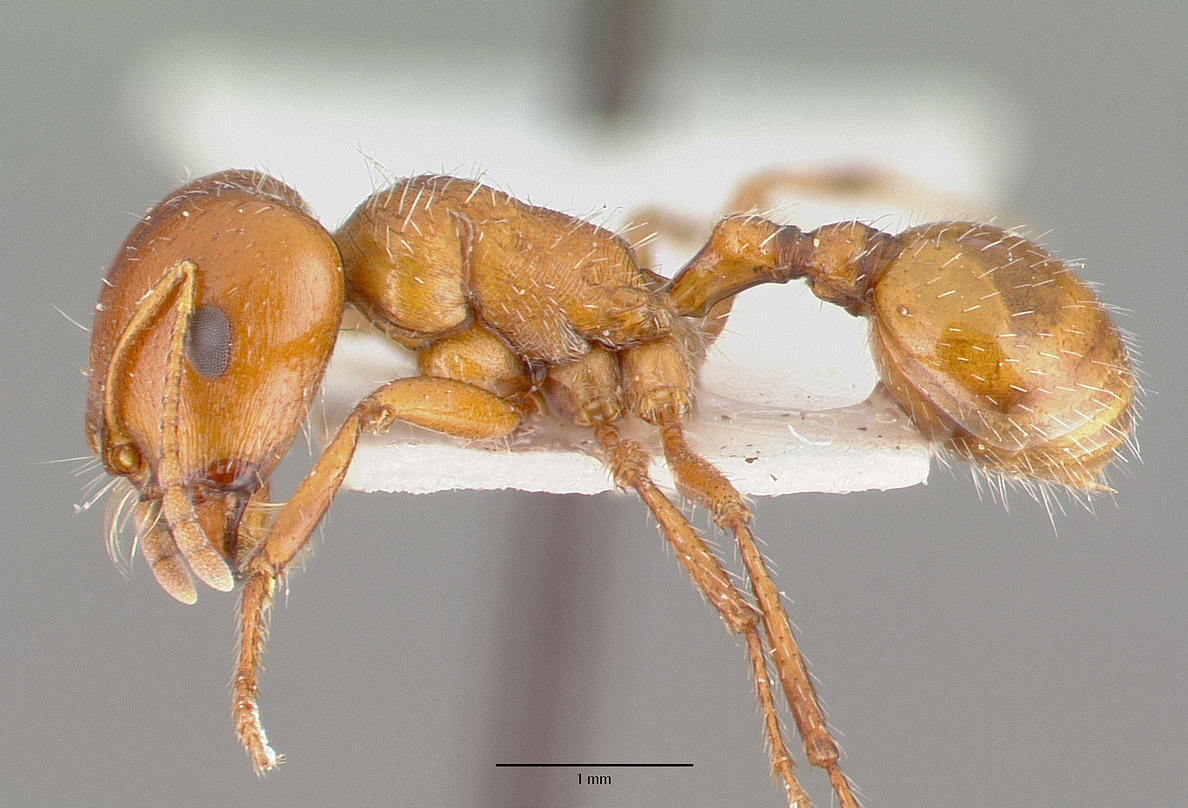
