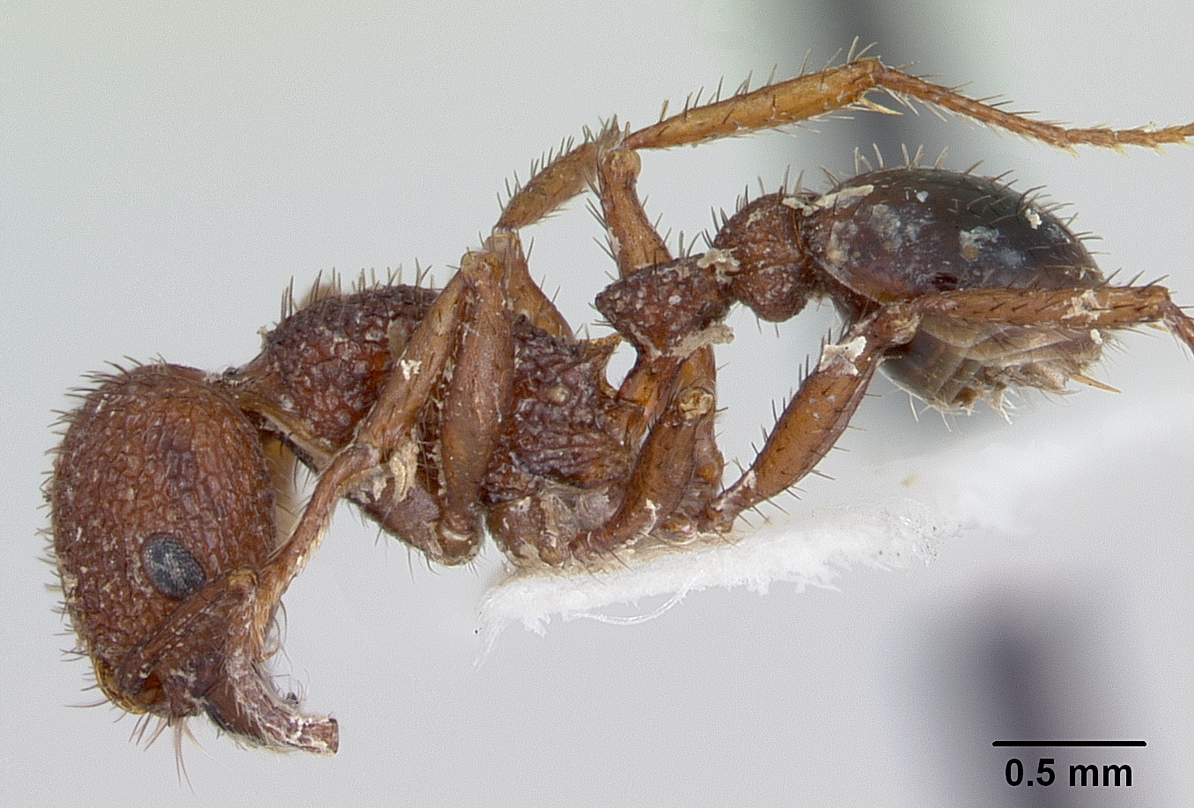
- Patagonomyrmex angustus

Scientific classification
- Kingdom: Animalia
- Phylum: Arthropoda
- Class: Insecta
- Order: Hymenoptera
- Family: Formicidae
- Subfamily: Myrmicinae
- Tribe: Pogonomyrmecini
- Genus: Patagonomyrmex; Johnson & Moreau, 2016

= Patagonomyrmex =

Genus of ants

Patagonomyrmex is a genus of ants in the subfamily Myrmicinae.

The species of this genus are found in Southern South America.

== Species ==
As of 2021, Patagonomyrmex contains three recognized species.

- Patagonomyrmex angustus (Mayr, 1870)
- Patagonomyrmex laevigatus (Santschi, 1921)
- Patagonomyrmex odoratus (Kusnezov, 1949)
