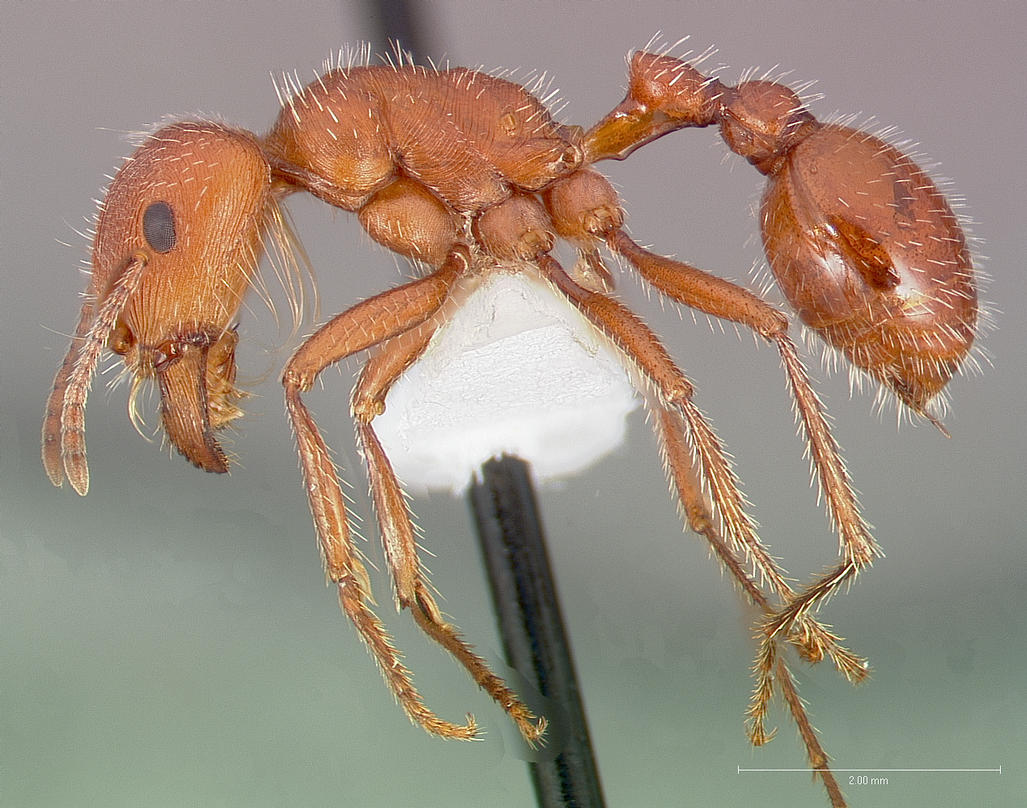
- P. maricopa worker

Scientific classification
- Kingdom: Animalia
- Phylum: Arthropoda
- Clade: Pancrustacea
- Class: Insecta
- Order: Hymenoptera
- Family: Formicidae
- Subfamily: Myrmicinae
- Genus: Pogonomyrmex
- Species: P. maricopa

Binomial name
- Pogonomyrmex maricopa Wheeler, 1914

= Pogonomyrmex maricopa =

Maricopa harvester ant

Species of ant

Pogonomyrmex maricopa, the Maricopa harvester ant, is one of the most common species of harvester ant found in the U.S. state of Arizona, but it is also known from California, Colorado, New Mexico, Nevada, Texas and Utah, and the Mexican states of Baja California, Chihuahua, Coahuila, Durango, Sinaloa and Sonora. Its venom is believed to be the most toxic insect venom in the world.

Their nest mounds are likely to incorporate rocks and gravel. The ants construct cemented caps on the sand mound nests in a fine sand dune area. The caps are approximately 60% calcium carbonate that is transported from the underlying calcium carbonate layers, and protect the nest structure from being eroded away during high-wind periods. Partial erosion of the cemented caps adds calcium carbonate to the sand dune soils.

== Venom and attack method ==
The venom toxicity of the Maricopa harvester ant is well known. Its LD_{50} value is 0.12 mg/kg (injected intravenously in mice); 12 stings can kill a 2-kg rat. By comparison, the LD_{50} of the honey bee is 2.8 mg/kg—less than one-twentieth as strong. In humans, a Pogonomyrmex sting produces intense pain that can last from four to eight hours.

Like that of many venomous insects, the venom of the Maricopa harvester ant consists of amino acids, peptides, and proteins. It also encompasses alkaloids, terpenes, polysaccharides, biogenic amines, and organic acids. But the most distinctive component in its venom is an alkaloid poison that releases an "alarm" pheromone which chemically alerts other ants in the vicinity. This is an example of chemical signaling, which explains why the ants all appear to sting at once.

Similar to the two-part process of the fire ant bite and sting, the harvester ant will attach to the victim with its mandibles and then pivot around the site, allowing the ant to repeatedly sting and inject venom into the region.

The Maricopa harvester ant plays a major role in decomposition by dragging dead carcasses of insects underground, thereby enriching soil for plants and crops.
