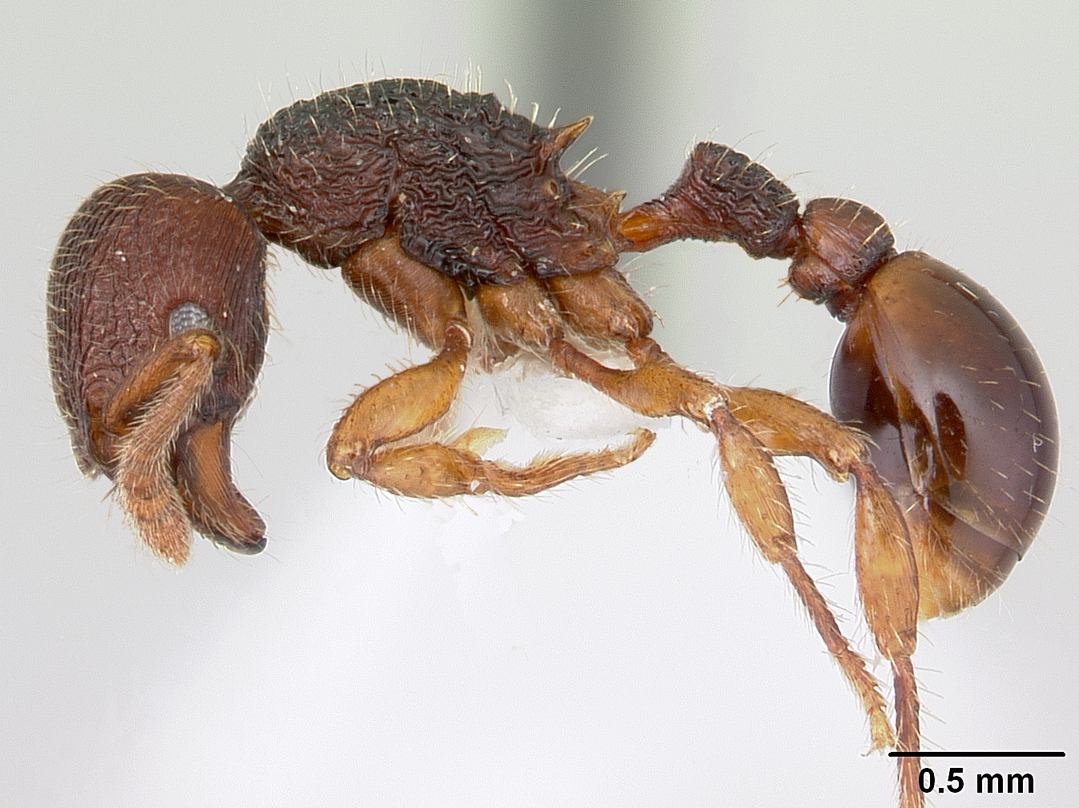
- Hylomyrma balzani worker

Scientific classification
- Domain: Eukaryota
- Kingdom: Animalia
- Phylum: Arthropoda
- Class: Insecta
- Order: Hymenoptera
- Family: Formicidae
- Subfamily: Myrmicinae
- Tribe: Pogonomyrmecini
- Genus: Hylomyrma; Forel, 1912

Type species
- Pogonomyrmex columbicus Forel, 1912

Diversity
- 30 species

Synonyms
- Lundella Emery, 1915

= Hylomyrma =

Genus of ants

Hylomyrma is a genus of myrmicine ants containing 30 known species.

== Species ==
- Hylomyrma adelae Ulysséa, 2021
- Hylomyrma balzani (Emery, 1894)
- Hylomyrma blandiens Kempf, 1961
- Hylomyrma columbica (Forel, 1912)
- Hylomyrma dandarae Ulysséa, 2021
- Hylomyrma dentiloba (Santschi, 1931)
- Hylomyrma dolichops Kempf, 1973
- Hylomyrma immanis Kempf, 1973
- Hylomyrma jeronimae Ulysséa, 2021
- Hylomyrma lispectorae Ulysséa, 2021
- Hylomyrma longiscapa Kempf, 1961
- Hylomyrma lopesi Ulysséa, 2021
- Hylomyrma macielae Ulysséa, 2021
- Hylomyrma margaridae Ulysséa, 2021
- Hylomyrma mariae Ulysséa, 2021
- Hylomyrma marielleae Ulysséa, 2021
- Hylomyrma mitiae Ulysséa, 2021
- Hylomyrma montana Pierce et al., 2017
- Hylomyrma peetersi Ulysséa, 2021
- Hylomyrma plumosa Pierce et al., 2017
- Hylomyrma praepotens Kempf, 1973
- Hylomyrma primavesi Ulysséa, 2021
- Hylomyrma reginae Kutter, 1977
- Hylomyrma reitteri (Mayr, 1887)
- Hylomyrma sagax Kempf, 1973
- Hylomyrma transversa Kempf, 1973
- Hylomyrma versuta Kempf, 1973
- Hylomyrma villemantae Neves & Lacau, 2018
- Hylomyrma virginiae Ulysséa, 2021
- Hylomyrma wachiperi Ulysséa, 2021
