= Pogonomyrmex fossilis =

Scientific classification
- Kingdom: Animalia
- Phylum: Arthropoda
- Clade: Pancrustacea
- Class: Insecta
- Order: Hymenoptera
- Family: Formicidae
- Subfamily: Myrmicinae
- Genus: Pogonomyrmex
- Species: †P. fossilis

Binomial name
- †Pogonomyrmex fossilis Carpenter, 1930

Extinct species of ant

Pogonomyrmex fossilis is an extinct ant species which lived during the Eocene 34 million years ago. The species built nests primarily destined to store seeds and grains as winter stock. The ant has an average length of six millimeter and an average width of 1.2 millimeters.

The first fossil was found in the American state of Colorado and the species was discovered and described by Carpenter in 1930. In 2003 Pogonomyrmex fossilis was the oldest described species within the genus Pogonomyrmex.
