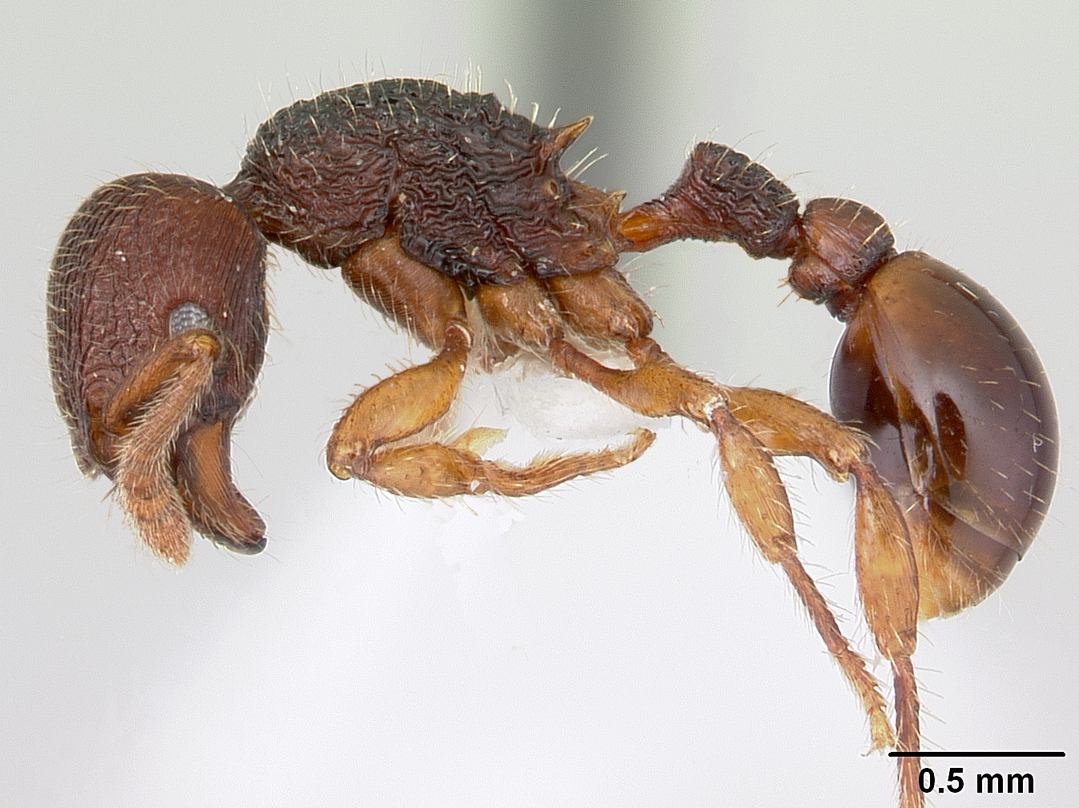
- Hylomyrma balzani worker specimen

Scientific classification
- Domain: Eukaryota
- Kingdom: Animalia
- Phylum: Arthropoda
- Class: Insecta
- Order: Hymenoptera
- Family: Formicidae
- Subfamily: Myrmicinae
- Genus: Hylomyrma
- Species: H. balzani

Binomial name
- Hylomyrma balzani (Emery, 1894)

= Hylomyrma balzani =

Species of ant

Hylomyrma balzani is an ant of the genus Hylomyrma native to Argentina, Brazil and Paraguay. It was described by Emery in 1894, where the first specimen of a worker was described.
