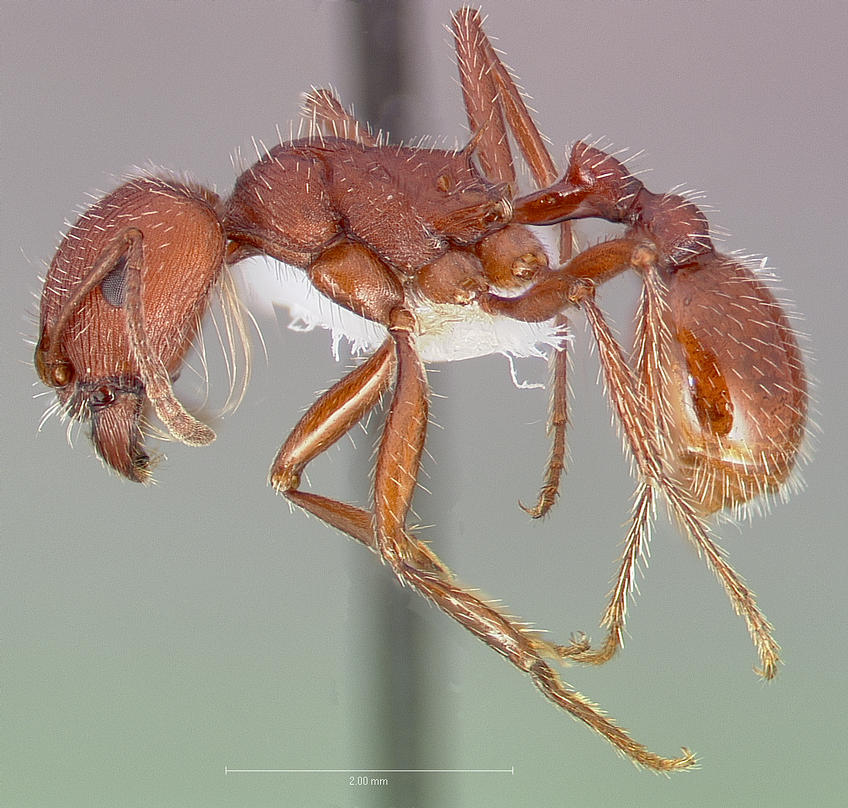
- P. occidentalis worker from California

Scientific classification
- Kingdom: Animalia
- Phylum: Arthropoda
- Clade: Pancrustacea
- Class: Insecta
- Order: Hymenoptera
- Family: Formicidae
- Subfamily: Myrmicinae
- Genus: Pogonomyrmex
- Species: P. occidentalis

Binomial name
- Pogonomyrmex occidentalis (Cresson, 1865)

= Pogonomyrmex occidentalis =

Western harvester ant

Species of ant

Pogonomyrmex occidentalis, or the western harvester ant, is a species of ant that inhabits the deserts and arid grasslands of the American West and Canada at or below 6,300 feet (1,900 m). Like other harvester ants in the genus Pogonomyrmex, it is so called because of its habit of collecting edible seeds and other food items. The specific epithet "occidentalis", meaning "of the west", refers to the fact that it is characteristic of the interior of the Western United States; its mounds of gravel, surrounded by areas denuded of plant life, are a conspicuous feature of rangeland. When numerous, they may cause such loss of grazing plants and seeds, as to constitute both a severe ecological and economic burden. They have a painful and venomous sting.

== Colonies ==
Mature colonies consist of up to 20,000 workers and one queen. A queen can live up to 30 years, and many colonies survive for 20 years. A colony inhabits a nest that is up to 5 metres (16 ft) deep. The queen stays at the bottom of the nest, and workers usually relocate themselves and brood within the nest, capturing safe levels of heat. A colony's nest is topped by an irregularly conical nest mound that can be more than 89 centimetres (35 in) in diameter. The composition, shape, and size of the mound differ across plant environments. The mounds of most colonies are surrounded by an area devoid of vegetation, and so do not burn during fires. The soil in the mound is drier than that in the surrounding denuded area. Bigger P. occidentalis colonies (in number of workers) have bigger mounds.

Individual queens found colonies on their own, without workers or other queens. Survivorship of colonies in the first year is negatively correlated with increasing density of foundresses. Foraging workers kill queens that they encounter aboveground and occasionally excavate queens. Factors independent of colony density are responsible for >90% of foundress mortality. Queens in some populations found colonies claustrally and in others, semi-claustrally. Many of the eggs laid in the first batch die or are unembryonated. During colony founding, larvae may eat eggs. The first workers produced, known as nanitics, are stunted. They are 2 mm (33%) shorter than typical workers of established colonies. 2/188 founding queens survived from July to March.

== Workers ==
Workers' bodies are usually dark red and those in a mature colony are on average 6 mm long. Workers vary in size, but are not subdivided into groups of different-sized individuals with special roles. A worker lives for an average of six months, and as it ages, it usually progresses through different roles within the colony. For example, workers forage towards the ends of their lives. In the field, workers are active when the temperature at the surface of the colony's mound is 25–53 °C (77–127 °F).

== Nutrition ==
Workers harvest seeds and pollen directly from plants and gather fallen seeds. Some seeds are sometimes stored in chambers within the nest and are depleted during winter. Workers also gather newly dead insects. Workers generally forage April–September. Workers generally forage throughout the day during cooler months and only 5–11 am and 3–9 pm during the summer. Genetically diverse colonies forage for more hours daily. Foraging times within a day and foraging temperature range vary consistently among colonies. Given a choice, workers select seeds containing more energy. Given a choice, workers select a diversity of seeds or seeds that are new to the colony. Workers usually forage one kind of item each day, but change their specialty daily. Workers usually forage in one direction over and over, even across days. Colonies recruit more workers (from the total worker pool) to forage at a good food source. Colonies lose foragers in encounters with neighboring colonies. Workers defend foraging territories against neighboring colonies. Different plant environments support different densities of colonies. Foragers produce more period mRNA during darkness, the timing of which varies seasonally.

== Association with Myrmecocystus mexicanus ==
Cole et al. surveyed the distribution of Myrmecocystus mexicanus nests, (a species of North American honey ant) relative to the distribution of P. occidentalis nests at a site in western Colorado and found that there was a definite spatial association between the two species. They also observed that M. mexicanus feeds on dead or close-to-death P. occidentalis workers, and believed that P. occidentalis provides the main source of food for the M. mexicanus colonies at that site. Thus, the M. mexicanus situates nests nearby P. occidentalis colonies to collect this source of nutrition. There was no substantial evidence that M. mexicanus actively predates healthy P. occidentalis workers.

== Biomass and brood production ==
Different developmental stages of ants within a colony process different kinds of food; larvae ingest solids, while adults ingest liquids, including larval excretions. Immature individuals cannot pass from one larval stage to another or to adulthood without the help of adults; adults help immature individuals remove their old larval and/or pupal skins during ecdysis (molting). As larvae are relatively immobile, they only interact with nutrients as adults bring the nutrients to the larvae or the larvae to the nutrients. Bigger colonies do not necessarily produce a greater total reproductive biomass. Colonies stop producing brood before they overwinter.

== Mating ==
Colonies release alates synchronously. Alates mate in hilltop leks in swarms. Major mating swarms are about 1.4 kilometres (0.87 mi) apart, and queens can fly no more than 800 metres (2,600 ft). Gynes mate with 2–11 (an average of 6.3) genetically distinct males. Females always mate with multiple males. Queens that mate only a few times are less successful. The colonies of queens that mate with more males grow faster. Males sometimes mate multiple times. Females mate nonrandomly. Larger males are more successful at mating (i.e. they are overrepresented among collected maters), but small males can still mate. Certain shape characteristics improve male chances of mating success. P. occidentalis populations are effectively small and inbred. Queens pick bare and bright areas to land and then dig where they land. Mating swarms that are consistently present and large determine much of the spatial variability in colony density and emerge over the long term. New colonies are founded in a clumped pattern, around the mating sites. The population may self-thin through direct interference competition resulting in a uniformly overdispersed distribution pattern. Long-term colony survival is mediated by proximity to older colonies. Smaller colonies have closer nearest neighbors. Smaller nests are more likely to die. The further a colony is from its nearest neighbor (especially for small colonies), the higher the colony's survival probability. Colony age and size are correlated, especially in young colonies.
