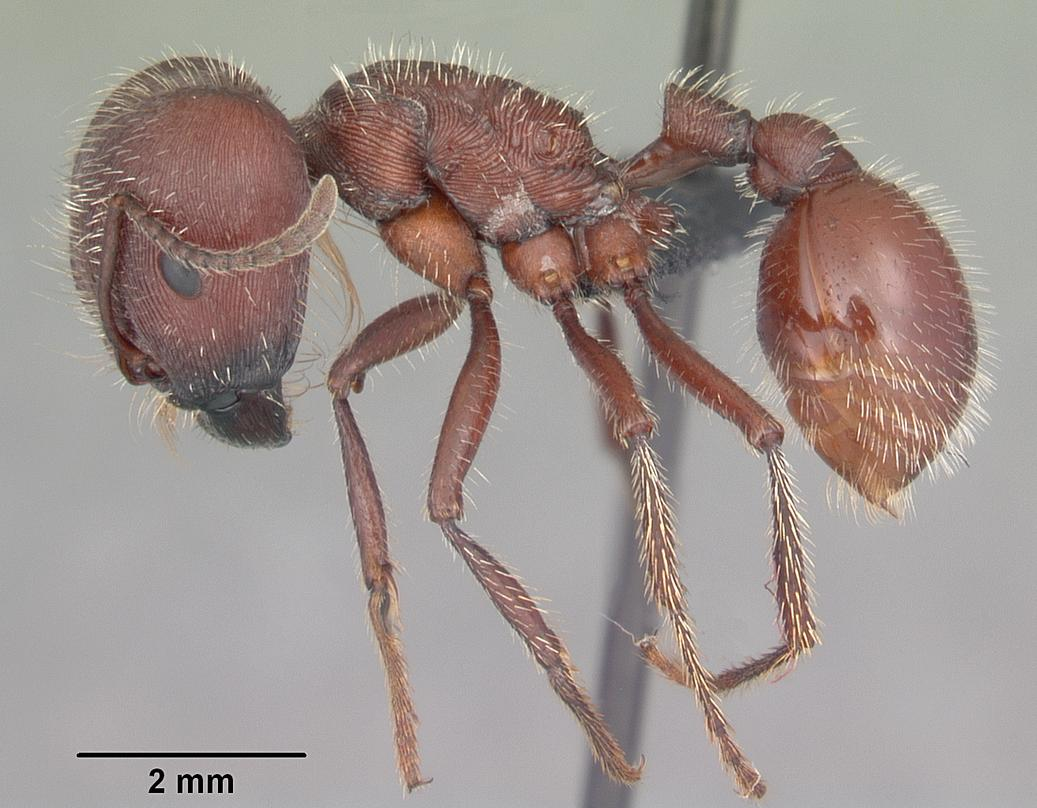
- Pogonomyrmex badius worker

Scientific classification
- Kingdom: Animalia
- Phylum: Arthropoda
- Class: Insecta
- Order: Hymenoptera
- Family: Formicidae
- Subfamily: Myrmicinae
- Genus: Pogonomyrmex
- Species: P. badius

Binomial name
- Pogonomyrmex badius (Latreille, 1802)

= Pogonomyrmex badius =

Species of harvester ant

Pogonomyrmex badius, or the Florida harvester ant, is a species of harvester ant in the genus Pogonomyrmex. It is the only Pogonomyrmex species found on the east coast of the United States and the only one in North America known to be polymorphic. The Florida Harvester ant is commonly found in Florida scrub and other similar habitats within the Atlantic coastal plain.

== Description ==
P. badius is a relatively large species of harvester ant present throughout Florida scrub and are one of the most notable and unique inhabitants of the ecoregion. The workers are highly polymorphic, ranging from 6.35 mm for the smallest workers to 9.52 mm for the largest majors which can rival the queen (10 - 12 mm) in size.

Both queens, majors and intermediates have disproportionately large heads, while minors have a more narrow complexion when viewed at the front. Under normal circumstances this species lacks epinotal spines which sit parallel on the propodeum though these spines may occasionally be present.

== Biology ==
=== Behavior ===
Unsolved problem in biology
Why do P. badius colonies cover the surface of their nests with a circular region of charcoal pieces?
More unsolved problems in biology

The Florida Harvester ant is a highly active diurnal species well adapted to the hot and dry habitats of the southeastern United States. Colonies are near exclusively found nesting within well drained sandy soils in xeric shrublands, grasslands, woodlands, and intact coastal dunes. Open sandy ground with sparse vegetation exposed to full sun is preferred as nesting sites. The nests of mature colonies are very deep, usually 2.5 to 3.0 meters deep with seeds being stored about 40 - 100 cm below ground in large flat granaries. On the surface the flat mound is free of peripheral vegetation and is decorated with detritus and charred plant matter, the purpose of which is poorly understood. Alongside the nest also exists short foraging trails which extend into the surrounding area, usually in the opposite direction of any neighboring colonies.

Labor partitioning in the colony is organized spatially in respect to the vertical axis of the nest as a result of age polyethism. The youngest workers, which care for the brood and queen, reside in the deepest portions of the nest and as they age move closer to the surface and take up the typically more perilous activities of maintaining and defending the nest as well as foraging for food. The result is a division of the worker population along age demographics that's strongly stratified with depth. Unusual amongst harvester ants, Pogonomyrmex badius is known for its seasonal nest relocations with colonies on average relocating once per year at a distance of 4 - 10 meters along an established foraging trail. New nests are rapidly excavated within a few days with there being little variance in architectural design between the new and old nests.

The diet consists mainly of seeds and insects. Commonly harvested grass species includes those of Paspalum setaceum, Dicanthelium commutatum, Croton michauxii and more. Seeds preferred are limited by size, as any seeds wider than 1 - 1.4 mm cannot be cracked open by the workers. Arthropod prey is regularly taken, with the ants having a stronger affinity for protein food items over the traditionally consumed seeds.

P. badius is associated with a couple known organisms - a few well-known being the parasitoid eucharitid wasp Kapala floridana and the introduced Texas horned lizard, which thrives in Florida due to the stable populations of these ants. P. badius may also be infected by the deadly Myrmicinosporidium durum, a parasitic fungus which causes the integument to turn a near black color.

=== Reproduction ===
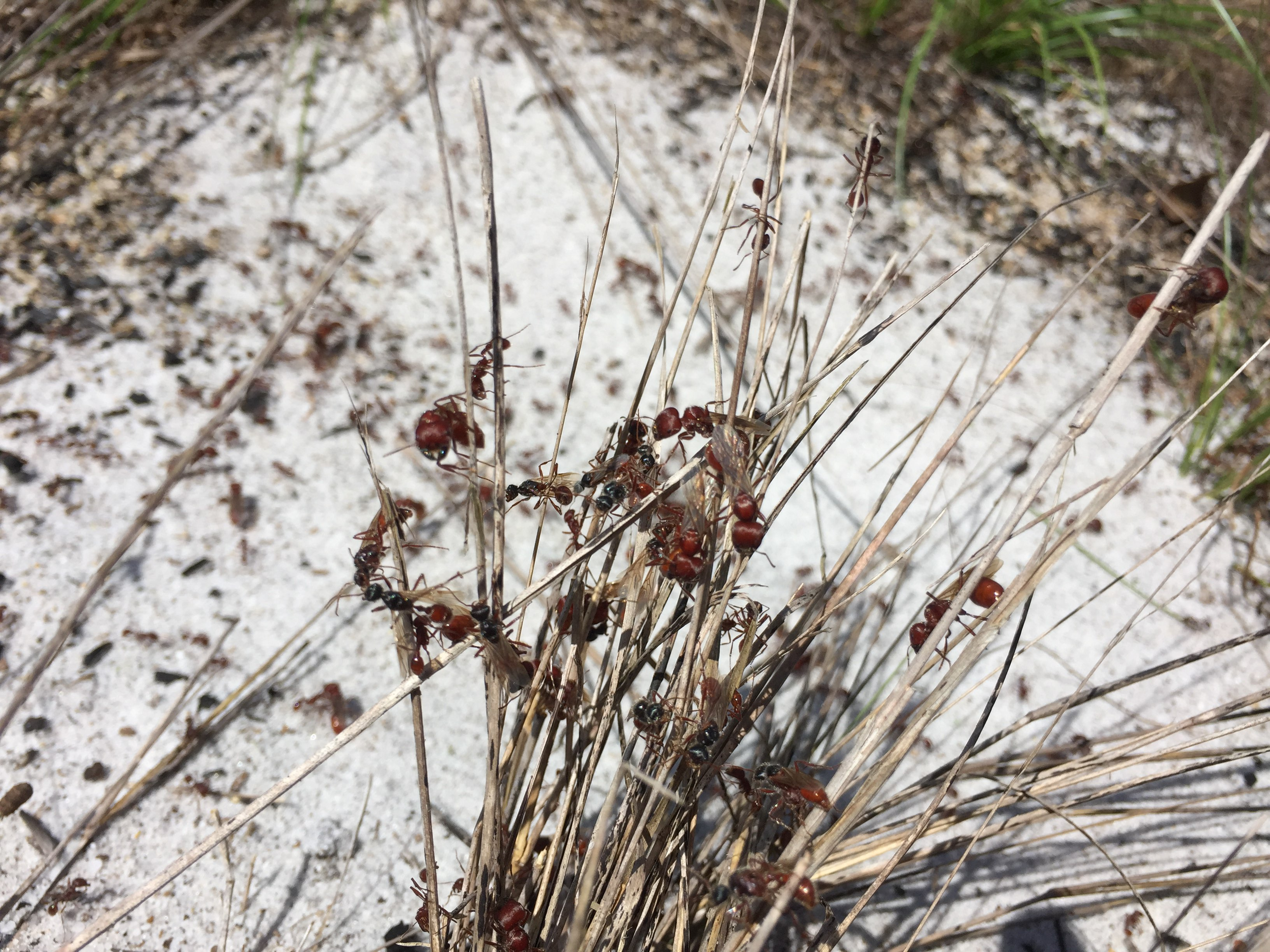
Nuptial flight of male and female Florida harvester ants

Colonies become sexually mature when the population reaches a minimum of ~700 or more workers, with the production of winged reproductives beginning around spring. Nuptial flights are most frequently observed from May to June with late season flights occurring in July. Flights occur during calm, sunny and humid mornings following a day of heavy rains which leave the ground moist. Female and male alates do not mate in the air, and instead males fly in from other nests to mate with females on the surface of their parent nest. Hundreds of excited workers can be observed in a frenzy around the vicinity of the nest disk during this time with many attempting to break apart copulating pairs. Female alates mate with multiple males over subsequent mating flights in the following days. Workers will gradually become more intolerant towards alates that attempt to re-enter the nest, with alates eventually either being forcibly evicted or denied entrance to the nest.

The newly mated queens will either fly off or walk some distance away from their parent nest to establish a new colony. Founding queens may temporarily work together in a phenomenon known as pleometrosis, but true polygyny has never been observed in mature colonies in the wild. Queens are fully claustral and do not venture out to feed when founding, instead solely relying on their fat reserves and wing muscles to sustain themselves and their brood.

=== Venom toxicity ===
Like most species belonging to the genus Pogonomyrmex, P. badius is equipped with a stinger capable of delivering a highly potent and painful neurotoxic venom adapted for defense against predatory vertebrates. The venom of this species is considerably toxic, with a mice LD_{50} of 0·42 μg/g—comparable to the most toxic snake venoms. Despite being so toxic, the yield per sting is significantly low, with dozens of stings being required to cause potential harm to a healthy adult. P. badius is also a rather docile ant, being reluctant to sting unless forced to, with stings usually occurring when the ant is trapped against the skin in some way.

Along with a few other Pogonomyrmex species, badius workers exhibit stinger autotomy in which the barbed stinger and venom sac is left embedded in the skin to continuously pump venom. The cost of this autotomy is the demise of the ant due to the internal damage from the stinger being pulled out, much like in honey bees.

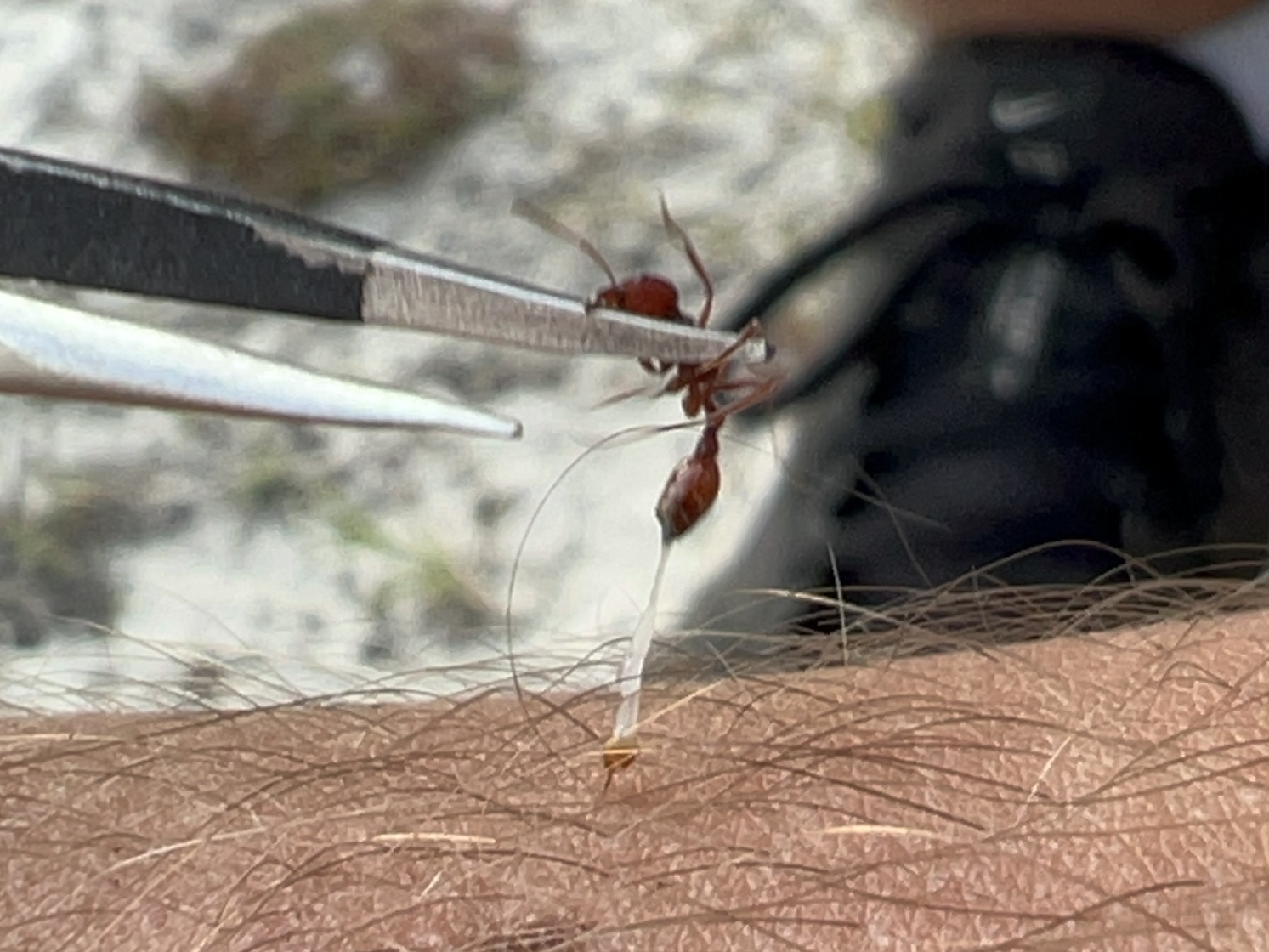
Stinger autotomy of Florida Harvester ant
