= Harvester ant =

Common name for several different ants

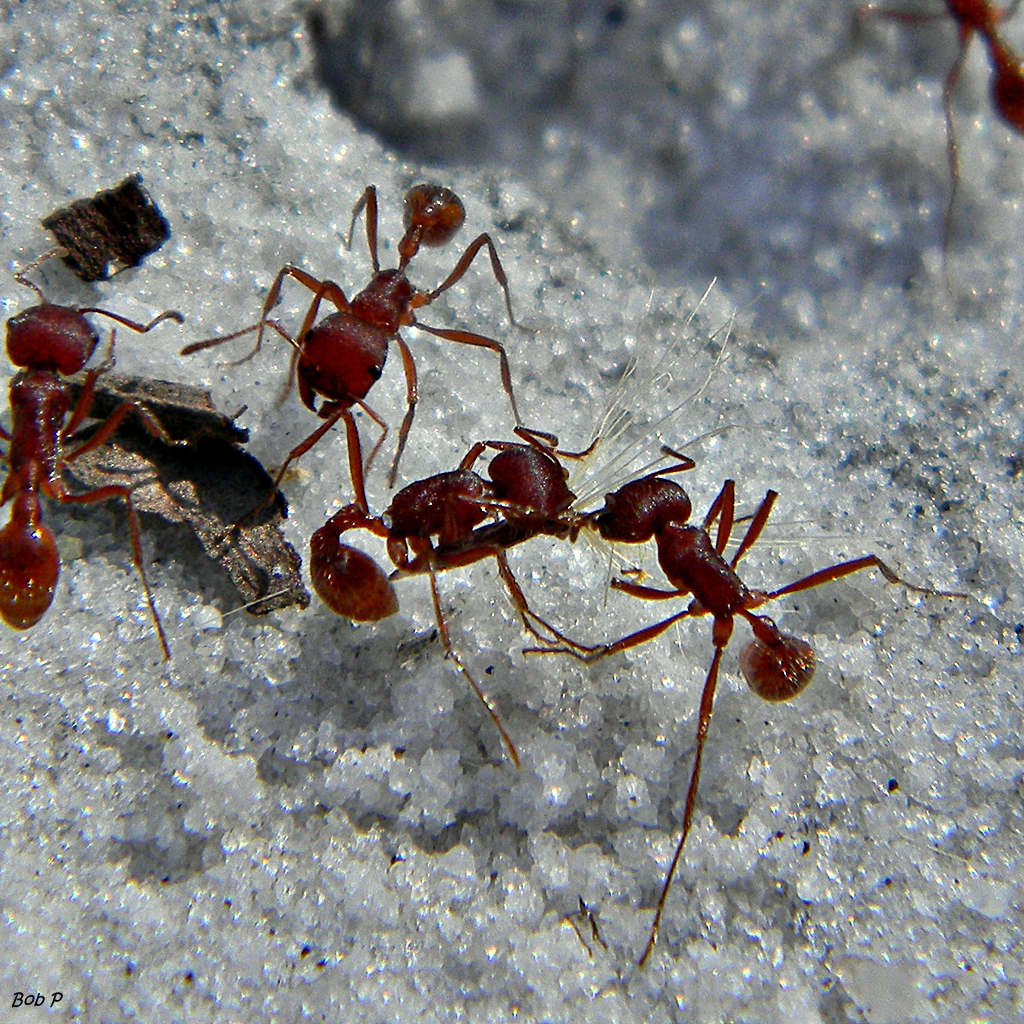
Pogonomyrmex badius workers transporting a seed to add to their granary

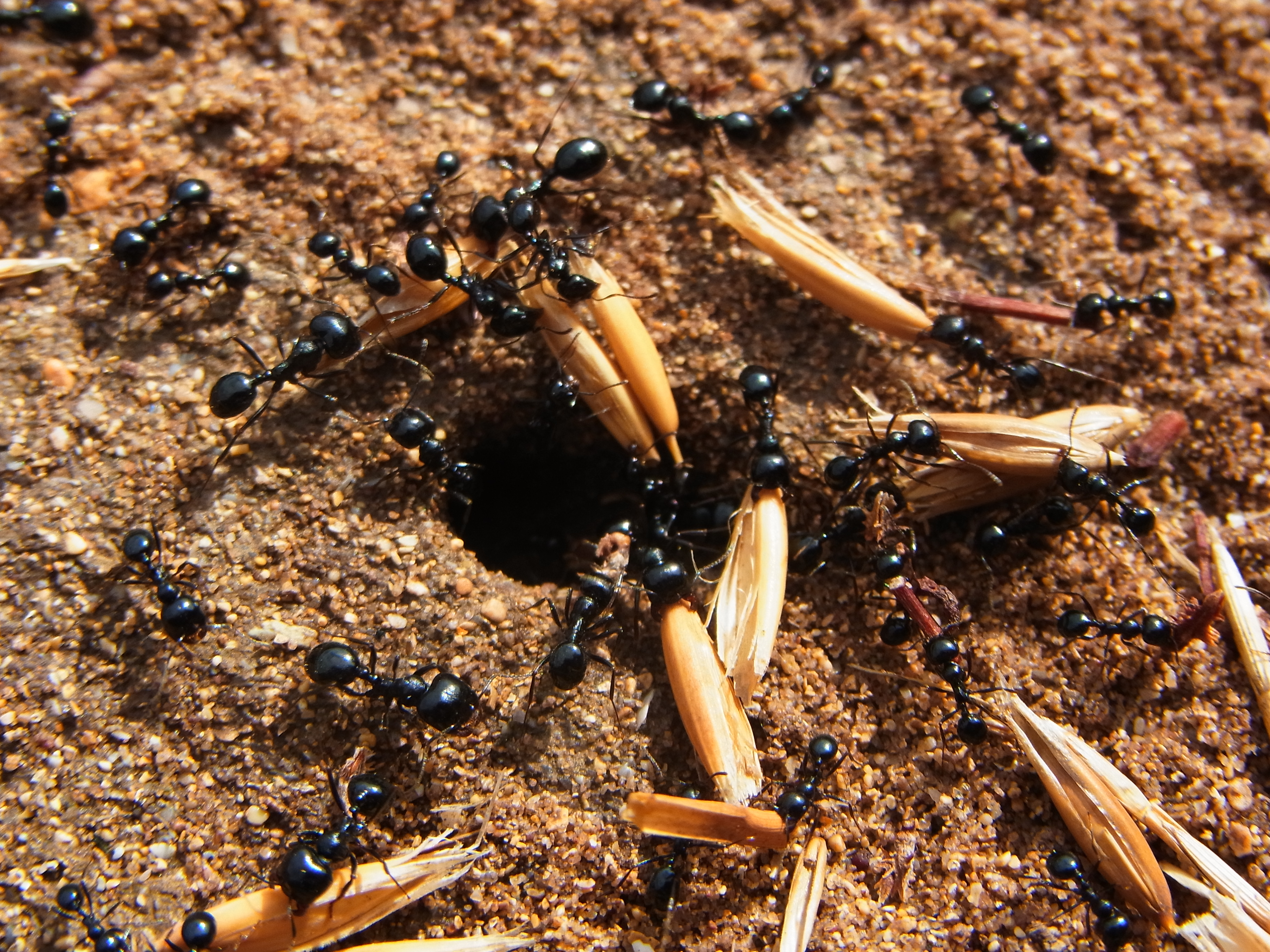
Messor sp. carrying seeds into their nest

Harvester ant is a common name for any of the species or genera of ants that collect seeds (called seed predation), or mushrooms as in the case of Euprenolepis procera, which are stored in the nest in communal chambers called granaries. They are also referred to as agricultural ants. Seed harvesting by some desert ants is an adaptation to the lack of typical ant resources such as prey or honeydew from hemipterans. Harvester ants increase seed dispersal and protection, and provide nutrients that increase seedling survival of the desert plants. In addition, ants provide soil aeration through the creation of galleries and chambers, mix deep and upper layers of soil, and incorporate organic refuse into the soil.

== Seed dispersal ==
Ants may play an important role in the dynamics of plant communities by acting either as seed dispersal agents or as seed predators, or both. During the day, these ants search the savannas for vegetation and plant seeds, and carry them along back to their nest. The two main mechanisms through which ants disperse seeds are myrmecochory, or seed dispersal mediated by the elaiosome, i.e., a lipid-rich seed appendage that mainly attracts non-granivorous ants and provides rewards for seed dispersal, and diszoochory, or seed dispersal performed by seed-harvesting ants that is not mediated by any particular seed structure. While the former has traditionally been recognized mainly as a mutualism, the latter is usually perceived as an antagonism.

== Foraging behavior ==
Harvester ants foraging in hot, dry conditions lose water, but obtain water from metabolizing fats in the seeds they eat. Positive feedback on foraging activity, from returning foragers with food, allows the colony to regulate its foraging activity according to the current costs of desiccation and the benefits based on current food availability.

In many harvester ant species, foraging behavior is influenced by the weather. For example, in the ant Veromessor andrei, recruitment to food bait is higher in more humid conditions. Both humidity and food availability are affected by day-to-day changes in weather conditions. Food is distributed by wind, with floods and rain uncovering seeds in the top layer of the soil. In Pogonomyrmex barbatus, daily changes in conditions such as humidity and food availability produce strong daily trends in the foraging activity of all colonies.

Colonies may vary in the relation between humidity and foraging activity. Colonies differ consistently from year to year in how often they forage at all and most colonies forage on days with high humidity and high food availability, such as those just after a rain when flooding has exposed a layer of seeds in the soil. Few colonies forage on very dry days. Colonies also differ in how likely they are to adjust the rate of outgoing foragers to the rate of forager return. While all colonies tend to adjust outgoing foraging rate closely when conditions are good, only some colonies do so in poor conditions.

== Sting ==
Harvester ants, for their size, have a rather potent venom. They inject it into their victim via sting by biting down and following up with a rapid sting from their abdomen. This causes 4–8 hours of sharp pain with effects similar to neurotoxicity such as piloerection and localized swelling around the area of the sting.

== Species and genera ==
- Aphaenogaster - about 200 species
- Novomessor, seed harvesters
  - Novomessor cockerelli
- Euprenolepis – eight species
  - Euprenolepis procera, nomadic mushroom-harvesters, a previously unknown lifestyle among ants
- Messor, seed-harvesters
- Pheidole, seed-harvesters
- Pogonomyrmex, seed-harvesters
  - Pogonomyrmex barbatus
  - Pogonomyrmex maricopa, a venomous species found in Arizona, USA
  - Pogonomyrmex occidentalis, seed-harvesters
- Carebara
  - Carebara diversa, seed harvesters

== See also ==
- Leafcutter ant
- Honeypot ant
