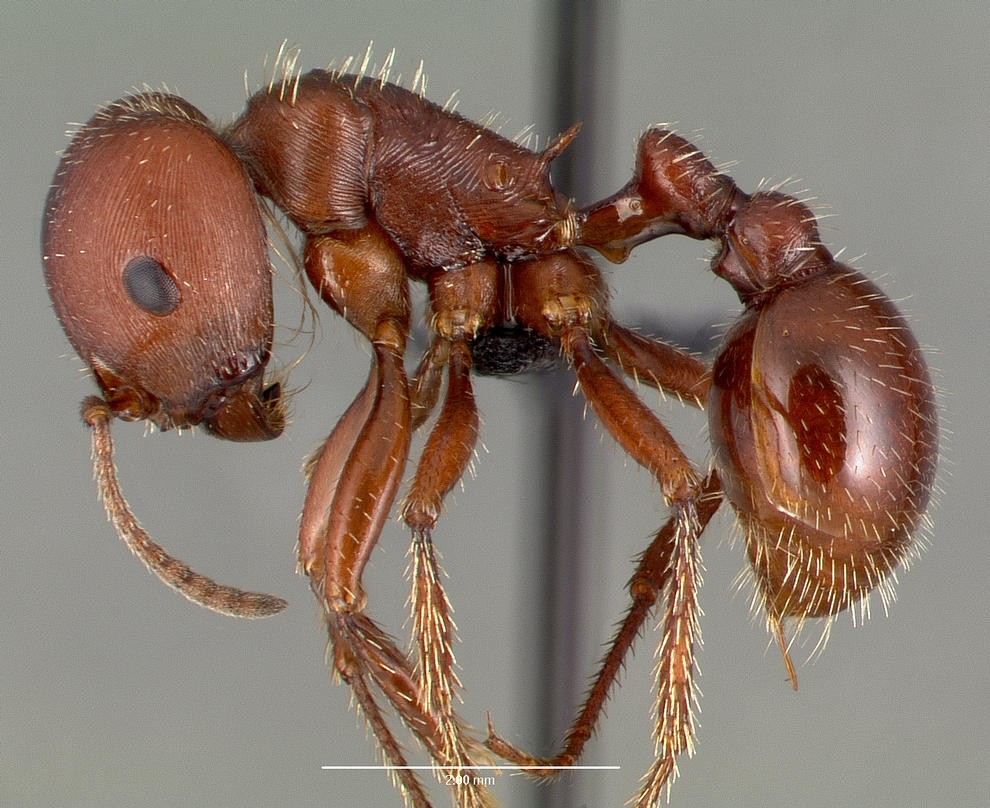
- Pogonomyrmex barbatus worker

Scientific classification
- Domain: Eukaryota
- Kingdom: Animalia
- Phylum: Arthropoda
- Class: Insecta
- Order: Hymenoptera
- Family: Formicidae
- Subfamily: Myrmicinae
- Tribe: Pogonomyrmecini; Ward, Brady, Fisher & Schultz, 2015

Type genus
- Pogonomyrmex Mayr, 1868

Diversity
- c. 3 genera

= Pogonomyrmecini =

Tribe of ants

Pogonomyrmecini is a tribe of myrmicine ants with three extant genera, recently formed in 2015.

== Genera ==
- Hylomyrma Forel, 1912
- Patagonomyrmex Johnson & Moreau, 2016
- Pogonomyrmex Mayr, 1868
