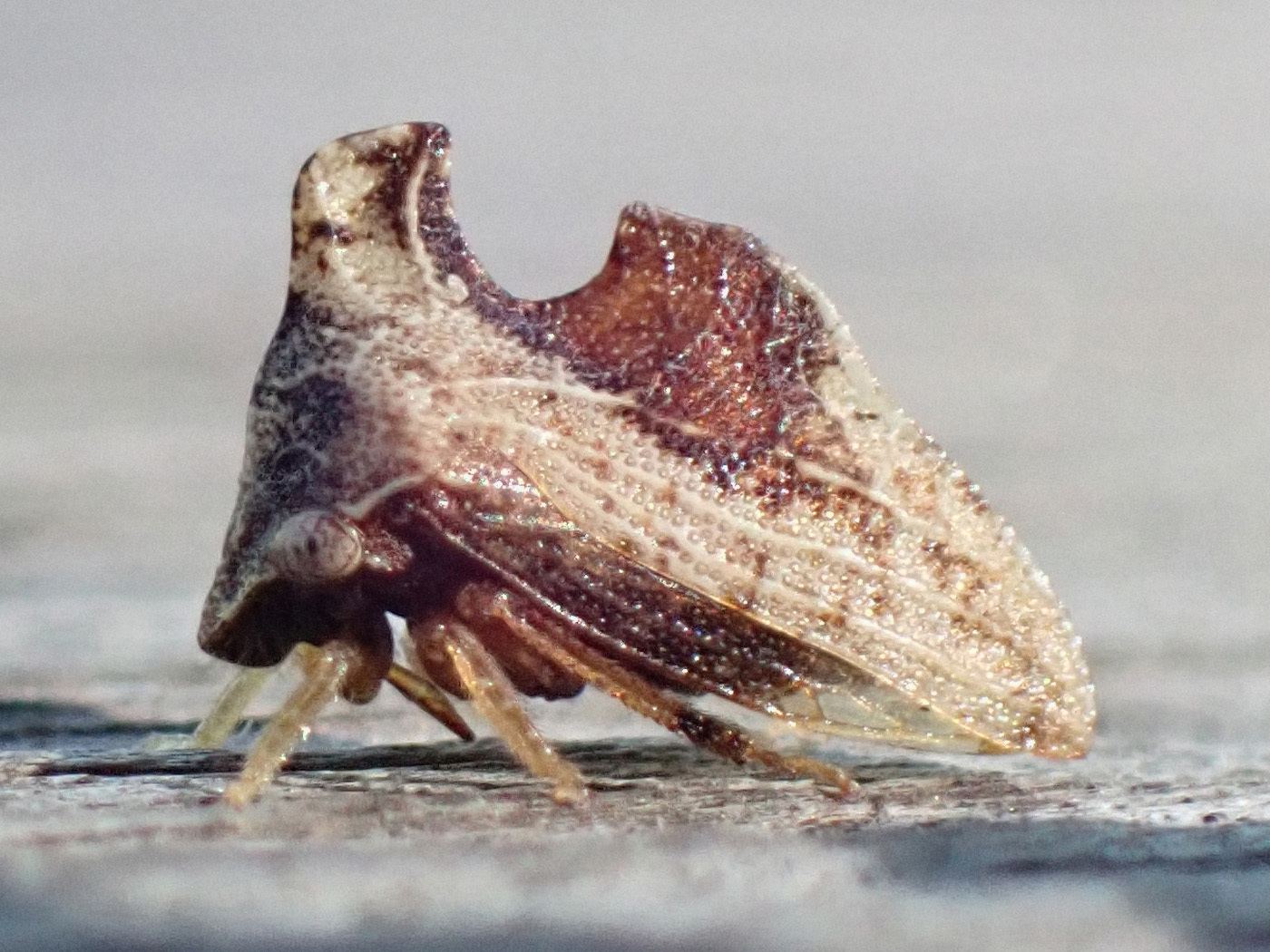

Scientific classification
- Kingdom: Animalia
- Phylum: Arthropoda
- Clade: Pancrustacea
- Class: Insecta
- Order: Hemiptera
- Suborder: Auchenorrhyncha
- Family: Membracidae
- Genus: Entylia
- Species: E. carinata

Binomial name
- Entylia carinata (Forster, 1771)

= Entylia carinata =

Species of true bug

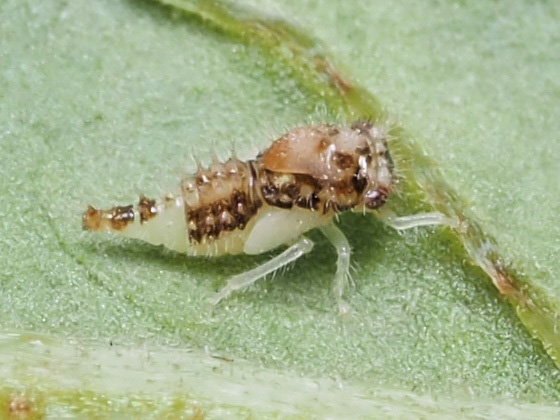
Nymph

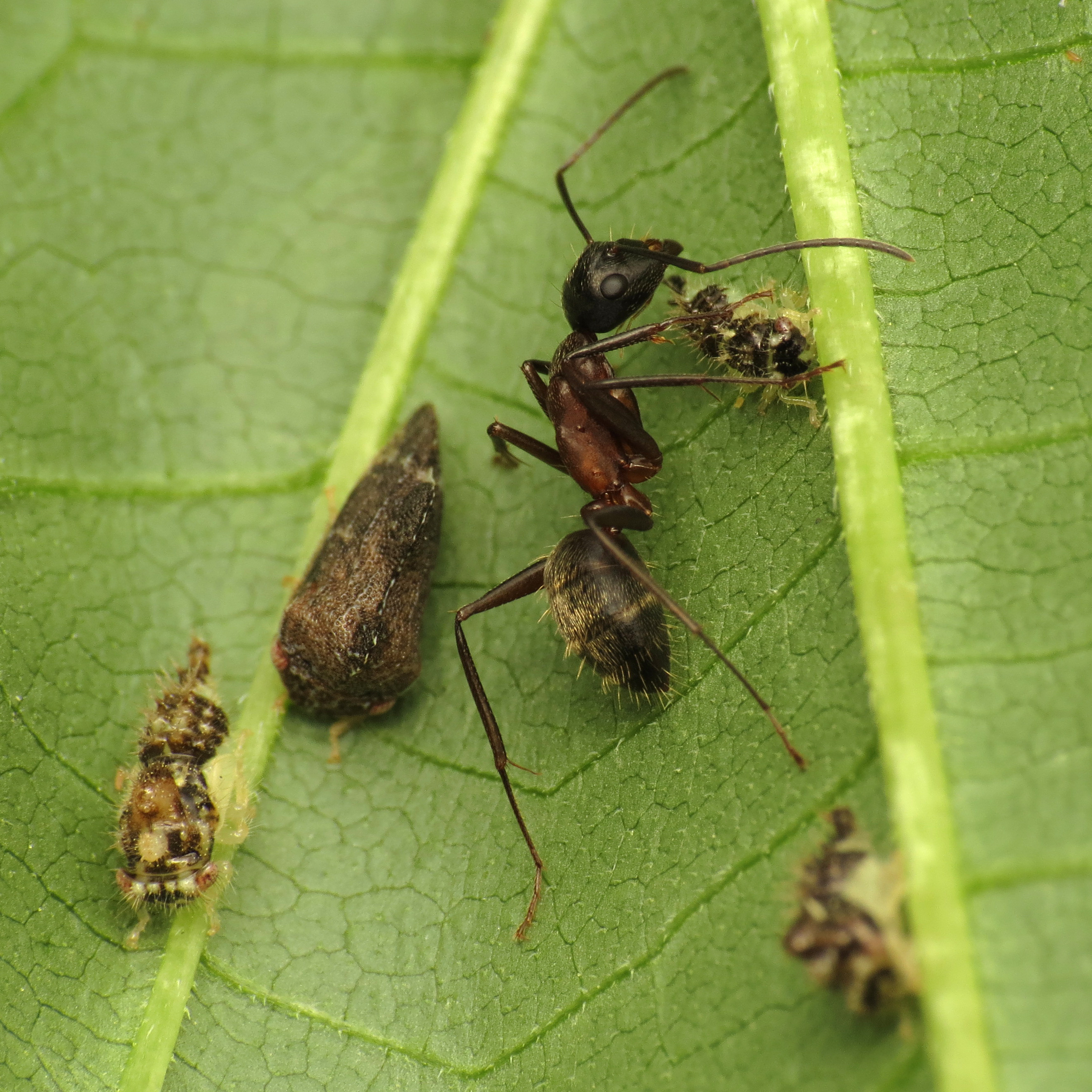
Carpenter Ant Tending to Keeled Treehoppers

Entylia carinata, commonly known as the keeled treehopper, is a species of treehopper in the family Membracidae. They can be found in Brazil, Panama, Mexico, the United States, and Canada. Keeled treehoppers are often attended by ants which feed on the honeydew they excrete. In return, the ants offer protection from predators. Keeled treehoppers typically feed on plants in the aster family and they are not known to transmit plant diseases and are not considered significant plant pests.

== Biology ==
=== Life cycle ===
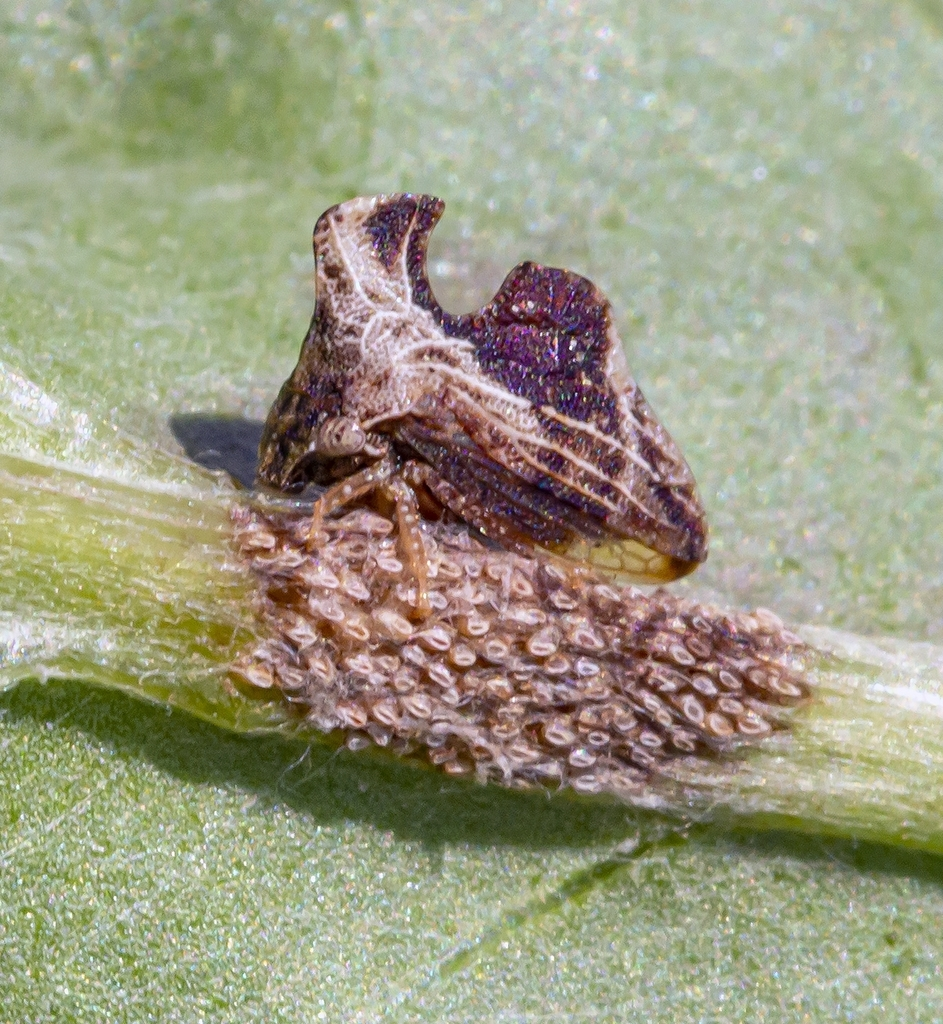
Keeled Treehopper (Entylia carinata) guarding eggs

As adults, keeled treehoppers spend the winter months in leaf litter and debris, finally emerging in March. They begin to reproduce and implant their eggs on aster leafs. During this time of year plants produce vulnerable growth and soft tissues which make it an optimal time to embed their eggs. Occasionally the laid eggs cause the leaf to fold over, forming a protected environment for the nymphs to develop in once they hatch.

=== Behavior ===
Keeled treehoppers mothers exhibit parental care and spend time protecting their egg masses. They are phloem feeders, and their diet consists of liquids extracted from plants. Plant sap, while a convenient material to feed on, is lacking in many different nutrients including essential amino acids. Because their food source is so nutrient poor, keeled treehoppers rely on obligate bacterial symbionts in specialized organs to supplement their diet.

=== Host plants ===
Keeled treehoppers can be found on plants such as asters, baccharis, fleabane, goldenrod, sunflowers, oaks, dogwood, solanum, dahlias, and many more. However, they exhibit a preference for plants in the family Asteraceae.

=== Geographic distribution ===
These insects can be found in Canada, the eastern United States, Mexico, Central America, and South America.

== Morphology ==
Keeled treehoppers have unique saddle shaped keels, and are small and brown. The species exhibits sexual dimorphism, females are typically 1/4 of an inch (6.35 mm) long with more pronounced keels while males are smaller, and their keels less noticeable. On occasion, males appear so different that they are misidentified.

== Symbiosis ==
Like many other species in the family Membracidae, keeled treehoppers have ant-tending mutualism. Ants care for both nymphs and adults. The ant species known to live symbiotically with keeled treehoppers are Camponotus ferrugineus, Formica subsericea, Prenolepis imparis, Tapinoma sessile, and Camponotus pennsylvanicus. Ants feed on treehopper honeydew and assist the treehoppers fending off predators and facilitating feeding. Honeydew feeding not only benefits ants, but also prevents nymphs from becoming trapped in the sticky material and sooty molds from growing on the host plants.

== See also ==
- Hemiptera
- Auchenorrhyncha
- Membracidae
- Entylia
