= It Came from the Desert =

1989 video game

- Developer: Cinemaware
- Publisher: Cinemaware
- Producer: Pat Cook
- Designer: David Riordan
- Programmer: Randy Platt
- Artists: Jeffrey Hilbers; Jeff Godfrey
- Writer: Kenneth Melville
- Composers: Greg Haggard; Jim Simmons
- Platforms: Amiga, MS-DOS, TurboGrafx-16
- Release: 1989: Amiga; 1990: MS-DOS; 1991: TurboGrafx
- Genre: Action-adventure
- Mode: Single-player

It Came from the Desert is a 1989 action-adventure game by Cinemaware. It was originally released for the Amiga, but later ported to MS-DOS, as well as released in distinctly different forms to consoles. The TurboGrafx-16 release is different from the computer versions, in terms of gameplay and presentation. An expansion, Antheads: It Came from the Desert II, was released in 1990.

The game is inspired by dozens of 1950s monster movies especially the 1954 mutant-ant classic Them!, with the title referencing the 1953 horror film, It Came from Outer Space. The game is a non-linear combination of dialogue boxes and several types of action scenes, typical of contemporary Cinemaware releases.

== Gameplay ==
It Came From the Desert is a point & click adventure with FPS and overhead sections. It is mostly based around detective work, with less puzzle based mechanics and more of a time based exploration mechanic.

== Plot ==
The player assumes the role of Dr. Greg Bradley who comes to remote Lizard Breath, California on June 1, 1951. As a geologist, he wants to study a meteor crash site somewhere in the desert south-west of the small town. Early in the game he learns that the radiation of the meteor has enlarged a local harvester ant population to an enormous size, however few take his observations seriously. Worried that the ants will soon multiply and spread, he must work against a ticking clock and devise a plan to stop the ants from terrorizing the world. In order to succeed the player must visit many locations ranging from mines, farms, a pub, an airfield, a local radio station and others to find evidence of the ants, then convince townsfolk and authorities of impending doom. At the same time the player must contain the ant infestation.

Only in using every resource available, from workers to the tanks and fighter jets of the National Guard, will the player be able to take the fight to the giant ants.

Mechanically, It Came From the Desert can be considered real-time. Waiting, sleeping (at home or in a hospital bed) and driving around consume time. As it turns out, the player has a fixed amount of in-game days (15 days, ending with June 15) to succeed. If Bradley fails by this date, the ants will spread, which results in a gloomy ending. To reach a good ending, the player must locate the ant colony and kill the queen ant.

== Release ==
It Came From the Desert was originally released for the Amiga in 1989 and then was ported to several other popular systems of the era. In early 1991, Cinemaware released a version for MS-DOS (ported by Level 9 Computing in a final attempt to stay in business before they ceased operations in June of that year). This version was, apart from minor palette differences, identical to the original.

A Genesis/Mega Drive version was to be released in 1990, but was cancelled. It is an overhead shooter with the main protagonist running around on foot, although it features more free roaming gameplay than traditional scrolling shooters. Among the differences in play mechanics, the Sega version allowed the player to create powerups that were fashioned by collecting machinery pieces and joining them together in different combinations. The storyline also differs from the Amiga and MS-DOS games, instead casting the player not as the scientist from the original but as a teenage pest control worker known as Buzz who makes a variety of improvisational weapons with various materials combined with his pest control equipment. Prior to cancellation, former Black Pearl Software programmer Matt Harmon stated that the Genesis/Mega Drive version was 99% complete. Although the Sega version was never actually offered for sale, it was distributed as a ROM image (for use with console emulators) from the Cinemaware website after the turn of the 21st century. Despite the similarity of camera perspective, the Sega version did not appear to reuse any of the graphical elements created for use in the computer-based versions. In 2014, Cinemaware teamed up with Pier Solar developer WaterMelon to develop a cartridge version called Extended Cut with new cutscenes, endings, a new intro sequence and "additional gameplay elements". As of April 2016, the game still has not been released.

The game and its expansion were released on Steam as part of a Cinemaware Anthology collection.

=== TurboGrafx-CD ===
The TurboGrafx-CD version, designed and directed by David Riordan, was released in 1991, co-developed by Interactive Pictures and First Light Entertainment. It is a CD-ROM based game that makes use of full motion video with recorded sequences of live actors. There are also action sequences that use drawn graphical elements (not captured, as seen in games such as Mean Streets by Access Software). The side-scrolling action sequence consists of the player battling ants in tunnels. The TurboGrafx-CD version did reuse the graphical elements from the computer version for the overhead battle sequences, but not for any of the character conversation segments. The storyline and characters were dramatically changed; the player character is no longer a spry scientist from the city visiting the countryside, but a local teenage biker punk named Buzz Lincoln who is somehow immune to the ant queen's mind control and begins a nearly hopeless counterattack against her hordes.

== Reception ==
In the July 1990 edition of Games International (Issue 16), John Scott commented: "Right from the opening sequence you know that this is something special." He noted the replayability of the game, noting: "There is no way that you will be able to discover all the subplots in one game, and this adds to the lasting appeal of the game." And he also lauded the technical aspects of the game, calling the graphics "first rate", and the sound "the best I've ever come across in any game." He concluded by rating both gameplay and graphics an excellent nine out of ten. Scott also reviewed the sequel Antheads, and found that it was too similar to the original game, noting: "More varied graphics and a complete new soundtrack would have been nice." However, Scott admitted that the low purchase price for what was essentially an add-on chapter made it a worthwhile purchase.

Computer Gaming World called It Came from the Desert "one of the most enjoyable programs yet to emerge from Cinemaware ... a very playable and compelling game with many enjoyable hours to be experienced". Antheads won game of the year honors from Computer & Video Games magazine.

In 1991, PC Format declared It Came from the Desert one of the 50 best computer games ever. The editors wrote that "a classic '50s B-movie plot combined with some lovely graphics make this a fun game".

== Expansion pack ==
It Came from the Desert was followed by a 1990 expansion pack called Antheads: It Came from the Desert II (known in North America as It Came from the Desert II) that required the player to already own the main game. The sequel was directed and designed by David Riordan and was available on store shelves in Europe and via mail order in North America.

== Legacy ==
- It Came From the Desert was parodied in a Space Quest IV reference: the player can find the box of the "Enemaware" game It came for Dessert in a store, where the woman holds a cake, and a fat man replaces the ant.
- An extensive spinoff appeared in the 1996 game Command & Conquer: Red Alert as four secret missions named "It came from Red Alert", where the player combats giant ants.
- In 2015, Cinemaware and Roger! Pictures developed a film version of the game. The film was directed by Marko Mäkilaakso. It was filmed in Almería (Spain) in the autumn of 2016, in the Tabernas Desert and in Rodalquilar.
- It Returned to the Desert is a spiritual successor which was released on February 15, 2023 for Windows PCs via Steam and Itch.io as a turn-based tactics and point-and-click adventure game.
