= Arthropods in film =

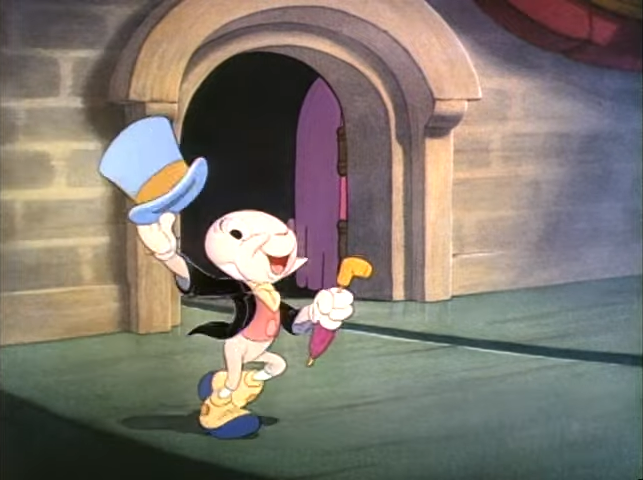
Jiminy Cricket, a character in the 1940 Walt Disney animation Pinocchio, is a typical anthropomorphized insect in film.

Arthropods, which include crustaceans, arachnids, and insects, are characterized in many different ways. Their bodies are segmented and covered by a cuticle, and their appendages have joints. These and other features set arthropods apart from other groups. Arthropods, mainly insects and arachnids, are used in film either to create fear and disgust in horror and thriller films, or they are anthropomorphized and used as sympathetic characters in animated children's films.

There are over 1,000,000 species of arthropods, including such familiar animals as ants, spiders, shrimps, crabs and butterflies. Many different films throughout history have involved the phylum Arthropoda. Some arthropods have distinct colorings and shapes that make them seem "pretty" to human observers, while others may have an appearance that is deemed "scary". "Bugs" like butterflies and dragonflies are often deemed prettier than ants and spiders. This outward judgement often comes from previous experiences that people have had with arthropods, as well as how arthropods have been and continue to be portrayed in common media.

Early 20th century films had difficulty featuring small insects due to technical difficulties in film-stock exposure and the quality of lenses available. Horror films involving arthropods include the pioneering 1954 Them!, featuring giant ants mutated by radiation, and the 1957 The Deadly Mantis. Films based on oversized arthropods are sometimes described as big bug movies.

Arthropods used in films may be animated, sculpted, or otherwise synthesized; however, in many cases these films use actual creatures. As these creatures are not easily tamed or directed, a specialist known as a "Bug Wrangler" may be hired to control and direct these creatures. Some bug wranglers have become famous as a result of their expertise, such as Norman Gary, a champion bee-wrangler who is also a college professor, and Steven R. Kutcher, who wrangles a multitude of different types of bugs and who is the subject of over 100 print articles.

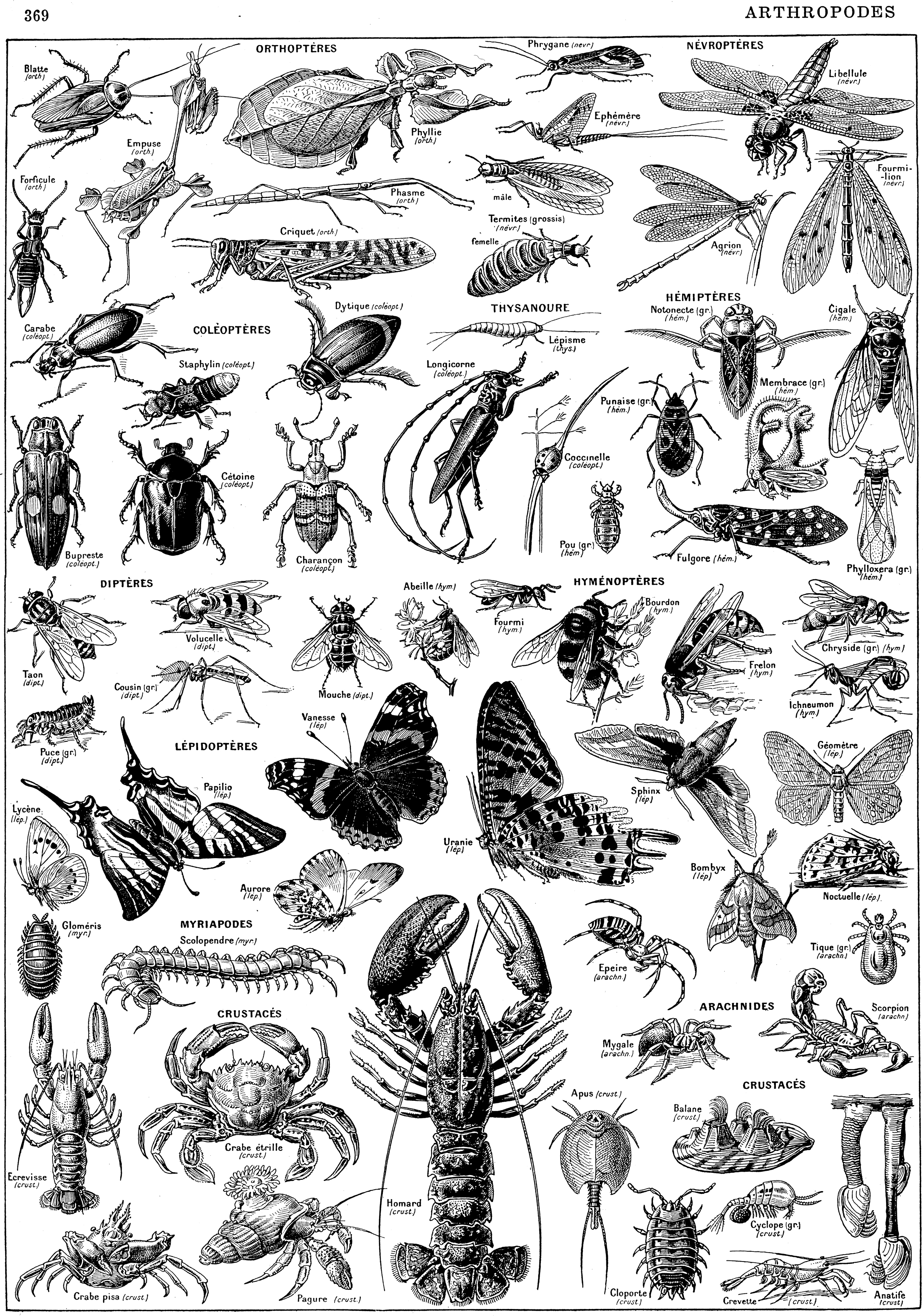
Illustrations of Arthropods

How arthropods were depicted in cinema has changed drastically in comparison to how they are depicted in cinema today. In his paper Us or Them!: Silent Spring and the Big Bug Films of the 1950s, Bellin describes how insects are shown to be evil and monstrous beings in several different films of the 1950s and 1960s. Films such as Them! illustrate a world where arthropods like ants are giant creatures that attempt to take over the planet. However, in other films such as Disney's Pinocchio, a character named Jiminy Cricket (representing crickets from phylum Arthropoda) is shown to be not ugly and scary but a rather cute and wise sidekick to the main character Pinocchio. In modern cinema, arthropods are associated with a number of Marvel superheroes including those from the films Ant-Man, Ant-Man and the Wasp, and Spider-Man. In these films, many arthropods and their qualities, like their strength and web-weaving abilities, are depicted in a positive light.

== Horror ==
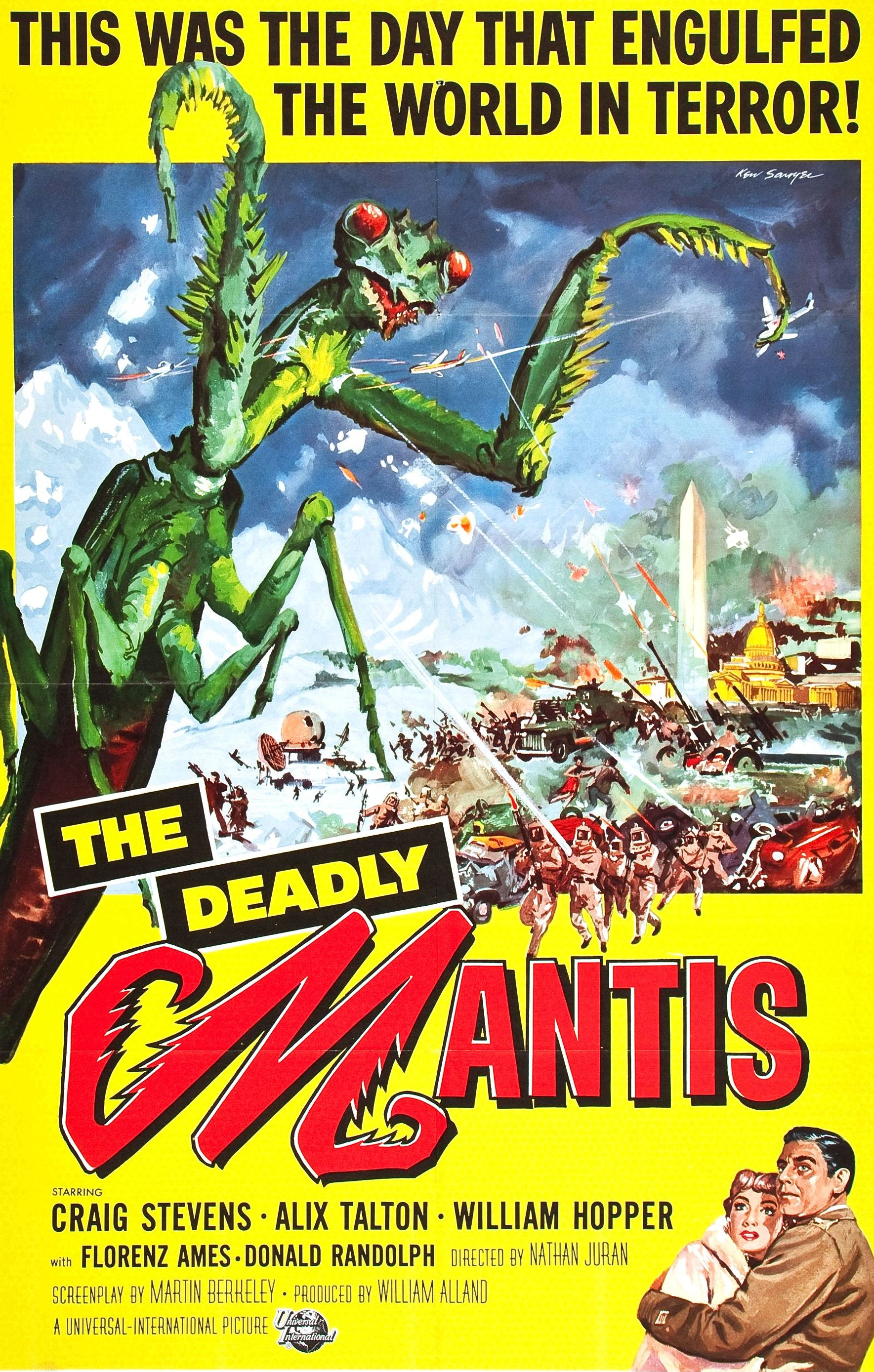
Film poster for The Deadly Mantis, 1957, directed by Nathan H. Juran. Artwork by Reynold Brown

Arthropods are effective tools to instill horror, because fear of arthropods may be conditioned into people's minds. Indeed, Jamie Whitten quoted in his book That We May Live, (talking about insects):

The enemy is already here-in the skies, in the fields, and waterways. It is dug into every square foot of our earth; it has invaded homes, schoolhouses, public buildings; it has poisoned food and water; it brings sickness and death by germ warfare to countless millions of people every year.... The enemy within-these walking, crawling, jumping, flying pests-destroy more crops than drought and floods. They destroy more buildings than fire. They are responsible for many of the most dreaded diseases of man and his domestic animals.... Some of them eat or attack everything man owns or produces-including man himself.

Thus, insects and other arthropods are dangerous to humans in both obvious and less obvious ways. Undoubtedly, arthropods are dangerous for their potential to carry disease. Somewhat less apparently, arthropods cause damage to buildings, crops, and animals. Since arthropods can be harmful in so many ways, using insects and other arthropods to frighten people in films was a logical step.

=== Giant insects or "Big Bugs" ===
Aside from a natural fear or aversion to arthropods, reasons for using such creatures in films could be metaphorical. Many of the most famous "Big Bug Movies" were made in the 1950s in the aftermath of World War II, when the world was introduced to the cataclysmic destruction inflicted by nuclear bombs. The bomb was unapproachable, remote, and terrifying; spiders and ants mutated by nuclear radiation to become huge were terrifying, but thanks to the competent government officials, soldiers, policemen, and detectives, the bugs were stopped and safety was restored. Nuclear terror was conquered without expressly facing a nuclear bomb. In this way, big bug movies could be cathartic and liberating to the general public. By another view, big bug movies could be less metaphorical, and more literally reflect concerns about the health effects of actual insect infestations as well as pesticides such as DDT.

Big bug films may symbolize sexual desire. Margaret Tarrat says in her article "Monsters of the id" that "[Big bug movies] arrive at social comment through a dramatization of the individual's anxiety about his or her own repressed sexual desires, which are incompatible with the morals of civilized life." By this theory, gigantic swarming insects could represent the huge, torrential—but repressed due to the demands of society—sexual desires possessed by the creator and viewer of the Big Bug movie.

On gigantic arthropods, Charles Q. Choi stated that, if the atmosphere had a higher percentage of oxygen, arthropods would be able to grow quite a bit larger before their trachea became too large and could not grow any more. In fact, in the early years of the Earth, when the atmosphere was more oxygen-rich, dragonflies the size of crows were not an uncommon sight. According to biologist Michael C. LaBarbera in "The Biology of B-Movie Monsters", there may be additional limitations on gigantic insects. Square-cube law would require allometric scaling for any scaled up or scaled down creature, contrary to most film monsters. For giant bugs as in Them!, their exoskeleton would consist of essentially hollow tubes—thin-walled tubes are very efficient structures, however any slight damage would make them vulnerable to buckling. Additionally he argues, giant insects would face greater stresses on their joints due to a very small contact area (pin joints) compared to vertebrate joints.

==== Animation ====
Winsor McCay, one of the founders of animation, made the first animated film about insects in 1912, titled How a Mosquito Operates. In the early 20th century, it was technically easier to include insects in animated films, which are drawn, over live-action films which would require more advanced techniques to film insects, due to their small size, necessitating better lenses and exposure techniques than those available at the time. One filmmaker, Władysław Starewicz, found that when filming live stag beetles, they tended to stop moving under the hot lights. To solve this problem, he killed his film subjects and attached wires to their bodies in order to puppeteer them. His films were successful, and he eventually abandoned real insects in favor of puppets of his own creation. One of the best-known animated insects is Jiminy Cricket, whose initial design was more realistic and insect-like, but eventually evolved into an elf-like creature. Computer-animated films have proven particularly suited for depicting insects, beginning with Pixar's 1984 short film The Adventures of André and Wally B. Early computer animation was successful at depicting rod-like appendages and shiny metallic surfaces, lending itself to the depiction of insects. By 1996, films like Joe’s Apartment achieved rendering hundreds of photorealistic insects. Other animated films continued to depict more anthropomorphized characters, such as A Bug's Life and Antz, both of which came out in 1998, and the 2007 Bee Movie.

One reason insects are used successfully in such animations could be that an insect or other arthropod's small size makes it seem heroic and sympathetic when faced against the big, big world. Another reason is counterpoint to the reason for using arthropods in horror films: whereas horror films play upon the instinctive negative reaction humans have towards insects and arachnids, these animation films make something that is different and strange seem real, approachable, and sympathetic, thus making it comforting.

== Action/fantasy ==
=== Ant-Man ===
Arthropods can be seen in the Marvel Cinematic Universe Ant-Man films. Both versions of Ant-Man, Hank Pym and Scott Lang, utilize technology that allows them to shrink to the size of an ant and communicate with ants, allowing the ants to assist them in various tasks. In the film, several different types of ant species are seen, including the crazy ant (Paratrechina longicornis), carpenter ant (Camponotus pennsylvanicus), the bullet ant (Paraponera clavata), and the fire ant (Solenopsis geminata).

=== Spider-Man ===
Spider-Man, a superhero with the motif and abilities of a spider, has drastically changed the way people view heroes and villains as well as the creatures they are associated with. One study uncovered that, statistically, the quantity of heroes and villains did not differ, even though it was thought that there would be more villains considered because more of the population associates spiders and other arthropods with danger.

Media such as Spider-Man and the aforementioned Ant-Man depict arthropods in a more positive light. They showcase the attributes of arthropods including their abilities of communication, strength, and defense as "superpowers" that could enhance human attributes. Illustrating arthropods in a nonthreatening manner may help to alleviate certain arthropod phobias to a certain extent. A study published in June 2019 by Hoffman et al. found that some people with a fear of arthropods who were exposed to short clips from Spider-Man and Ant-Man saw a small decrease in their fear of arthropods. While this study needs further experimentation, it does show that companies are profiting by portraying arthropods in a positive manner rather than a threatening and negative one, as they have often done so in the past.

=== A Bug's Life ===
A Bug's Life was created in 1998, and it is a production by Pixar Animation Studios for Walt Disney Pictures. The film follows a colony of ants who are forced to give their food to a group of grasshoppers led by Hopper. This exchange happens annually with no issues until one year, when a clumsy ant named Flik accidentally destroys the food. Flik is sent to find allies to battle the grasshoppers and eventually overcomes Hopper, defying everyone's expectations.

While the film depicts a fictionalized version of ants, it does describe some real abilities that ants do showcase. Colonies of ant often times have to hunt for weeks and days to find enough food, and then have to protect the food from potential attackers. In real life, a singular ant would not be able to bring back as much food by themselves.
