= Vector control =

Method for reducing disease transmission

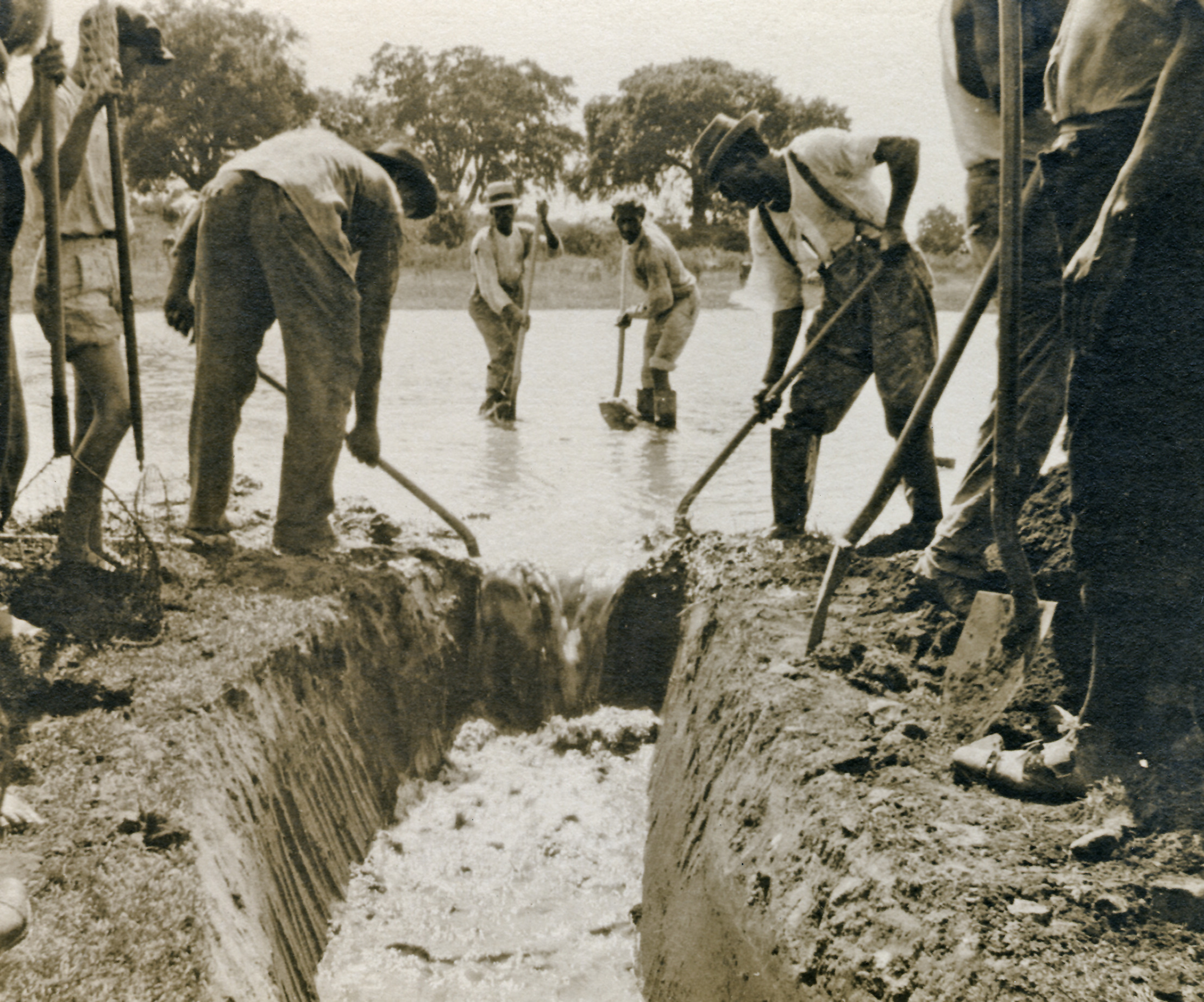
Vector control taking place in the Southern United States during the 1920s.

Vector control is any method to limit or eradicate the mammals, birds, insects or other arthropods (here collectively called "vectors") which transmit disease pathogens. The most frequent type of vector control is mosquito control using a variety of strategies. Several of the "neglected tropical diseases" are spread by such vectors.

== Importance ==
For diseases where there is no effective cure, such as Zika virus, West Nile fever and Dengue fever, vector control remains the only way to protect human populations.

However, even for vector-borne diseases with effective treatments the high cost of treatment remains a huge barrier to large amounts of developing world populations. Despite being treatable, malaria has by far the greatest impact on human health from vectors. In Africa, a child dies every minute of malaria; this is a reduction of more than 50% since 2000 due to vector control. In countries where malaria is well established the World Health Organization estimates countries lose 1.3% annual economic income due to the disease. Both prevention through vector control and treatment are needed to protect populations.

As the impacts of disease and virus are devastating, the need to control the vectors in which they carried is prioritized. Vector control in many developing countries can have tremendous impacts as it reduces mortality rates, especially among infants. Because of the high movement of the population, disease spread is also a greater issue in these areas.

As many vector control methods are effective against multiple diseases, they can be integrated together to combat multiple diseases at once. The World Health Organization therefore recommends "Integrated Vector Management" as the process for developing and implementing strategies for vector control.

== Methods ==
Vector control focuses on utilizing preventive methods to control or eliminate vector populations. Common preventive measures are:

=== Habitat and environmental control ===
Removing or reducing areas where vectors can easily breed can help limit their growth. For example, stagnant water removal, destruction of old tires and cans which serve as mosquito breeding environments, and good management of used water can reduce areas of excessive vector incidence.

Further examples of environmental control is by reducing the prevalence of open defecation or improving the designs and maintenance of pit latrines. This can reduce the incidence of flies acting as vectors to spread diseases via their contact with feces of infected people.

=== Reducing contact ===
Limiting exposure to insects or animals that are known disease vectors can reduce infection risks significantly. For example, bed nets, window screens on homes, or protective clothing can help reduce the likelihood of contact with vectors. To be effective this requires education and promotion of methods among the population to raise the awareness of vector threats.

=== Chemical control ===
Insecticides, larvicides, rodenticides, Lethal ovitraps and repellents can be used to control vectors. For example, larvicides can be used in mosquito breeding zones; insecticides can be applied to house walls or bed nets, and use of personal repellents can reduce incidence of insect bites and thus infection. The use of pesticides for vector control is promoted by the World Health Organization (WHO) and has proven to be highly effective.

=== Biological control ===
The use of natural vector predators, such as bacterial toxins or botanical compounds, can help control vector populations. Using fish that eat mosquito larvae, the use of Catfish to eat up mosquito larvae in ponds can eradicate the mosquito population, or reducing breeding rates by introducing sterilized male tsetse flies have been shown to control vector populations and reduce infection risks.

== Legislation ==
=== United States ===
In the United States, cities or special districts are responsible for vector control. For example, in California, the Greater Los Angeles County Vector Control District is a special district set up by the state to oversee vector control in multiple cities.

== See also ==
- Mosquito control
- Public health
- Soil-transmitted helminth
- Waterborne diseases
