= Steven R. Kutcher =

American entomologist

Steven R Kutcher
- Born: January 9, 1944; Manhattan, New York, U.S.
- Other name: The Bug Man of Hollywood
- Notable work: Arachnophobia, Jurassic Park, Spider-Man (2002)

Comedy career
- Medium: Film; Television; Radio; Live appearances Watercolor
- Genres: Bug wrangling, bug art
- Website: http://BugsAreMyBusiness.com http://BugArtBySteven.com

Steven R. Kutcher (born January 9, 1944) is an American entomologist who has worked as a "wrangler" of insects and other arthropods in the entertainment industry. He has gained media attention as "The Bug Man of Hollywood." In recent years, Kutcher has attracted additional notice by using insects as "living brushes" to create "Bug Art," while continuing his work as a naturalist and educator.

== Background, education, and training ==
Born in Manhattan, New York, a young Steven R. Kutcher collected fireflies in the Catskill Mountains. Kutcher continued to collect insects after his family moved to a suburb of Los Angeles, California, this time in the Santa Monica Mountains. At 19, Kutcher traveled 3000 miles around Mexico, exploring desert to tropical ecosystems.

Kutcher received a bachelors degree in entomology from the University of California, Davis, in 1968; and a Master of Science degree in biology from the California State University, Long Beach, in 1975. His formal studies focused on insect behavior — in particular the aggregating behavior of the milkweed bug, Oncopeltus fasciitis — observed via time-lapse cinematography under experimental conditions.

In 1970, Kutcher began his work in the entertainment industry as "Larry J. Felix" in The Stein and Illes Radio Show, a comedy show on KUSC, in Southern California; James R. Stein and Robert Illes would both become Emmy Award–winning TV writers and producers. Kutcher received comedic training from Bill Cosby and once had Robin Williams as an audience.

== "The Bug Man of Hollywood" ==
Since 1977, Kutcher has manipulated the instinctive behaviors of arthropods, and the instinctive reactions of audiences, mostly in the horror, thriller, fantasy, and comedy genres. He has worked with insects on over 100 feature films, including Spider-Man (2002), Jurassic Park, and Arachnophobia. Kutcher has also worked on numerous popular television shows—including CSI: NY, MacGyver, and The X-Files – as well as TV commercials and online advertising for Fortune 500 corporations.

As "The Bug Man of Hollywood," Kutcher has himself been the subject of numerous interviews. He has appeared on TV talk shows, including The Tonight Show Starring Johnny Carson and Late Night with David Letterman. In 1992, Kutcher appeared as a guest on the Emmy-nominated "Spider Episode" of the TV talk show parody The Larry Sanders Show, starring Garry Shandling. In 1998, Kutcher appeared on the British TV children's show The Scoop, which won a BAFTA award.

== Manipulating insect behavior ==
Applying his expertise on arthropod behaviors, Kutcher manipulates instinctive responses such as positive or negative sensitivity to light, air pressure, or gravity to make bugs perform scripted tricks on cue, such as:

- A live wasp flies harmlessly into the mouth of actor Roddy McDowell.
- A cockroach runs across the floor and then, "hitting its mark", flips over on its back.
- A spider crawls across a room and then into a slipper.
- A cockroach crawls out of a shoe, walks up a bag of snack food and onto a surfing magazine, and then stops upon a picture of a surfboard.
- A praying mantis, a scorpion, and beetles power-up a cell phone as part of a "Bug Circus" in online ad (a la a traditional flea circus).
- Hundreds of bees or thousands of locusts swarm on camera as called for in the script.

== "Bug Art" ==
In the 1980s, for a Steven Spielberg television project, Steven Kutcher made a fly walk through ink and leave footprints as directed. Since 2000, Steven Kutcher has been creating "Bug Art," using various arthropods as "living brushes" to apply gouache and other nontoxic paints on watercolor paper. "I use water-based, nontoxic paints that easily wash off", he says. "I have to take good care of them. After all, they are artists!" The abstract to surrealistic compositions are shaped by Kutcher's methods of manipulating insect movements, and are often influenced by the works of Impressionist and other master painters.

== Contributions as scientist, naturalist, and educator ==
Steven Kutcher has given talks and live-insect demonstrations at hundreds of film festivals, seminars, workshops, museums, libraries, and schools (pre-K through post-graduate level). Kutcher has been instrumental in creating annual insect fairs, as at the Los Angeles County Museum of Natural History and Los Angeles County Arboretum, which have been attended by more than 100,000 children and adults. Kutcher also served as a consultant in the development of the interactive insect exhibits at the Kidspace Children's Museum, in Pasadena, California.

Kutcher has taught outdoor education workshops for such environmental organizations as the Audubon Society, the Sierra Club, and Tree People. With a milkweed butterfly garden of his own, Kutcher is on the board of the Monarch Program Kutcher has consulted on the biology and control of arthropods for major corporations and government agencies, such as the Greater Los Angeles County Vector Control District.

For over 30 years, Kutcher has taught entomology, zoology, and biology courses at West Lost Angeles College, Culver City, but has also taught for four other community colleges.

== Partial Filmography ==
=== Theatrical films ===
In addition to serving as "bug wrangler" or entomology consultant for numerous student and independent films, Kutcher has worked on many feature films from major studios and production companies:

Film	Year	Featured "bugs"
We Bought a Zoo	2011	Swarm of honey bees
G-Force	2009	Tarantula, cockroach (test shots for animation)
National Treasure: Book of Secrets	2007	Beetles etc.
The Hitcher	2007	Spiders, scorpion
Antwone Fisher	2002	Grasshoppers
Spider-Man	2002	Spiders (wrangled live spiders and consulted on cgi spiders, as "The Spider Man Behind Spider-Man")
Wild Wild West	1998	Tarantula
Lost Highway	1997	Spider, moths
Mimic	1997	Ants, termites
Alien: Resurrection	1997	Spider (with web)
L.A. Confidential	1996	Maggots (on body under house)
D3: The Mighty Ducks	1996	Ants
Jack	1996	Monarch butterflies
James and the Giant Peach	1996	Dwarf tarantulas (in costume)
A Very Brady Sequel	1996	Tarantula
Copycat	1995	Carpenter ants (covering Sigourney Weaver)
Matilda	1995	Cockroach (and newt)
A Walk in the Clouds	1995	Butterflies
Leprechaun 2	1994	Cockroaches (green) and tarantulas
Jurassic Park	1993	Mosquitoes (live and "prehistoric," simulated by crane fly in "amber")
The Temp	1993	Wasps, scorpions, cockroaches
Meet the Applegates	1991	Praying mantis, tarantula
Arachnophobia	1990	Spiders, crickets, etc.
Back to the Future Part II	1989	Various insects (pinned etc. in displays)
The 'Burbs	1989	Bees
Fright Night II	1989	Mealworms etc.
Police Academy 6: City Under Siege	1989	Cabbage white butterflies (as "moths")
A Nightmare on Elm Street 3: Dream Warriors	1987	Dragonfly, fly
The Golden Child	1986	Monarch butterfly
The Goonies	1985	Leech (scene cut)
Exorcist II: The Heretic	1977	Locusts (grasshoppers)

=== TV movies and series ===
TV production	Year	Featured "bugs"
An Inconvenient Woman	c. 1991	Fly
Bernie Mac Show, The	2003	Mealworm beetles
Boy Meets World	c. 1997, 1999	Snails, bees
Buck Rogers in the 25th Century	c. 1980	Dragonflies
Chicago Hope	2000	Tarantula
Criminal Minds	2012, 2013, 2013	Maggots, flies, waxworms, praying mantis
CSI: NY	2006	Mealworms
Family Matters	c. 1995	Giant mealworms
Kung Fu: The Movie	1986	Grasshopper
Larry Sanders Show, the (Emmy-nominated "The Spider Episode")	1996	Tarantulas
Laverne and Shirley Reunion	2002	Cockroaches etc.
Life with Bonnie (The Bonnie Hunt Show)	2004	Honey bee
MacGyver	1991	Cockroaches
Mentalist, The	2013	
Monk	2005	Bees
Power Rangers	1994	Praying mantis, cockroaches
Tarantulas: The Deadly Cargo	1977	Tarantulas
Women of Brewster Place, The	1989	Cockroach
Wonder Woman	1978	Ants
The X-Files	1999, 2005	Flies, moths
The Young and the Restless	1991	Ants

=== Music videos ===
Artist	Project	Year	Featured "bugs"
Paula Abdul			Butterflies (in display case)
Christina Aguilera	"Fighter"	2002	Moths
Alice Cooper	Welcome to My Nightmare		Scorpions, mealworms
Godsmack	"I Stand Alone"	2002	Scorpion
M.C. Hammer		1992	Butterflies
Billy Idol	"L.A. Woman"	1990	Cockroach, mealworm
Janet Jackson	"Together Again" (Deeper Remix)	1997	Butterfly
Michael Jackson	"Stranger in Moscow"	1996	Wasp
Korn		1996	Cockroaches
No Doubt	Don't Speak	1996	Fly, mealworms

=== TV and online commercials ===
Market segment	Brands	Featured "bugs"
Automobiles	Chrysler, Dodge, Fiat, Honda, Hyundai, Jeep, Kia, Lexus, Mini Cooper, Mitsubishi, Peugeot, Subaru, Toyota, Volkswagen	Bees, beetles, butterflies, dragonflies, flies, grasshoppers, ladybugs, scorpions, spider webs
Consumer electronics	Apple, Dell, Goldstar, Hewlett Packard, Hitachi, Kodak, Nintendo Game Boy, Panasonic, Polaroid, Sega, Sony, TDK, VCR Plus	Ants, bees, butterflies, flies, moths, praying mantids, snails
Consumer goods (misc.)	Adidas, All, Anderson Windows, Avia, Dial Soap, Dockers, Evinrude, Galoop Toys, Gladlock, Hallmark, K-Mart, Kleenex, Levi Strauss, Lowes, Nike, Northern Bathroom Tissue, Omega Watch, Revlon, Sears, Snuggles, Standard Brands Paint, Stainmaster, Sunlight Detergent, Swatch	Bees, beetles, butterflies, caterpillars, cockroaches, flies, ladybugs, mosquitoes, moths, spiders
Energy	Chevron, Florida Power and Light, Mobil, Sempra	Ants, beetles, butterflies, flies, ladybugs, spider webs
Entertainment	Cartoon Network, PGA, Virginia Lottery, WCW	Ants, beetles, cockroaches, flies, mealworms
Fast food and other restaurants	Applebee's, Carl's Jr., Dunkin' Donuts, KFC, McDonald's, Seven-Eleven, Souplantation, Taco Bell	Bees, butterflies, moth cocoons, praying mantids
Finance and insurance	Blue Cross, Capital One, Chase, Fuji Bank, Hartford Insurance, Interstate Bank, Premier Insurance, Tri-County Health, Barclay's	Bees, butterflies, caterpillars, ladybugs, millipedes, walkingsticks
Food and beverages	Gerber's, Bud Light, Dr. Pepper, Dryer's, Gallo, Jolly Rancher, Mauna Loa, Michelob, Milk Advisory Board ("Got Milk?"), Moet, Orida potatoes, Pepsi, Planter's, Reese's Pieces, Rath Blackhawk bacon, Smith's Markets, Snickers, Zima	Ants, bees, butterflies, caterpillars, flies, Jerusalem crickets, moths, tarantulas and other spiders, wasps
Industrial and commodities	Alcoa, Georgia Pacific, Monsanto	Ants, butterflies, moths, spider webs
Pest control	Combat, Orkin, Ortho, Scott's	Ants, butterflies, cockroaches, grubs, termites
Public service announcements (PSAs)	AD Council, Partnership for a Drug-Free America	Bugs (misc.), leeches
Telecom	AT&T, Atlantic Bell, Bell Canada, Qualcomm, Telecom Italia, Verizon	Bees, beetles, butterflies, cockroaches, mealworms, mosquitoes, praying mantids, scorpions, tarantulas

== See also ==
- Animal training
- Arthropods in film
