= Orlando Wells =

English actor

- Born: 9 June 1973 (age 53); Pembury, Kent, England
- Education: University of Oxford; London Academy of Music and Dramatic Art

Orlando Wells (born 9 June 1973) is an English actor and writer. He is married with four children, and is the son of actress Susannah York.

== Career ==
As an actor, Wells played defence barrister Miles Gastrell in The Jury: Murder Trial series 3 and the Home Secretary, Hugh Devereux, in Slow Horses series 5. On stage, he is best known for playing Irwin in Alan Bennett's History Boys and John Stonehouse in James Graham's This House.

As a writer, his latest play, Lenin Forever!, was recently broadcast on BBC Radio 4. A satirical take on the madness of living under a tyrannical regime, it tells the story of the two scientists tasked by Stalin to embalm Lenin in 1924.

He has also written five original plays: The Winter Room (RSC fringe festival), Cold Enough, The Tin Horizon (Theatre 503), The Woodcutter's Tale (developed with NT Studio), and Four Days in Hong Kong (about Glenn Greenwald's and Laura Poitras's first meeting with Edward Snowden), produced for the Orange Tree Theatre Festival.

Michael Billington wrote in The Guardian of The Tin Horizon, ' shows a wild imagination at work and displays unmistakable signs of talent...a play that proves Wells has a gift for gothic futurism... a name to watch...'

Wells revised and adapted Patrick Hamilton's The Duke in Darkness for a 2013 production at the Tabard Theatre, Chiswick, directed by Phoebe Barran. The following year Wells co-wrote, with Opera Erratica director Patrick Eakin Young, the libretto for the experimental opera Triptych, performed in 2014 at The Print Room and Wilton's Music Hall.

He has written the full-length feature Bait the Hook, and a short film, Shrike, longlisted for Channel 4's Coming Up.

== Selected credits ==
=== Theatre ===
- Romeo and Juliet (2024) as Friar Lawrence (RSC and tour, First Encounters)
- Abigail's Party (2022) as Lawrence Moss (Watford Palace Theatre).
- This House (2016 - 2018 stage play, Chichester Festival Theatre, the Garrick Theatre, London, and tour) as an ensemble cast member playing various characters including John Stonehouse and Alan Clark
- Noises Off (2016, ETT, Nottingham Playhouse) as Lloyd Dallas, the director
- Tonight at 8.30 (2014, stage play, ETT/ Nuffield) as Christian in The Astonished Heart, Jasper in Family Album, Mr Wadhurst in Hands Across the Sea, Murdoch in Ways and Means, Stanley in Still Life, George in Shadow Play and Major Blake in We Were Dancing
- The Turn of the Screw (2013, stage play, The Almeida) as Sackville
- The Woman in Black (2010, stage play, Fortune Theatre) as The Actor
- Katrina (2009, stage play, The Bargehouse, South Bank) as Larry
- Our Country's Good (2009, stage play, The Watermill) as Lieutenant Ralph Clark
- The History Boys (2006–07, stage play, RNT) as Irwin
- Pirandello's Henry IV (2004, stage play, Donmar Warehouse) as Count Di Nolli
- A Midsummer Night's Dream (2003, stage play, The Crucible) as Demetrius
- The Modernists (2003, stage play, The Crucible) as Clifford
- The Tempest (2002, stage play, Thelma Holt) as Ferdinand
- A Midsummer Night's Dream (1999-2000, stage play, RSC) as Flute
- Othello (1999-2000, stage play, RSC)
- Anthony and Cleopatra (1999-2000, stage play, RSC) as the Messenger

=== TV and film ===
- The Jury: Murder Trial (2025, Channel 4) as Miles Gastrell
- Slow Horses (2025, Apple TV) as Hugh Devereux
- A Spy Among Friends (2021, ITV) as Michael Straight
- The Playlist (2021, Netflix) as Peter Thiel
- Grantchester (2020, ITV) as Hugo Drinkwater
- Father Brown (2018, BBC) as Eugene Cornelius
- Casualty (2015, BBC)
- Doctors (2010/ 12/ 14, BBC)
- Holby City (2010, BBC)
- The King's Speech (2010, See Saw Films) as The Duke of Kent
- Nowhere Left to Hide (2009, Blast Films)
- A Very British Sex Scandal (2007, TV drama-documentary) as Edward (Lord) Montagu
- Midsummer Madness (2007, feature film) as Curt
- The Great San Francisco Earthquake (2006, Blast Films) as James
- Slave Dynasty (2006, BBC) as William Beckford
- Trust (BBC, 2005) as Charles Drinkwater
- As If (2001–04, TV series) as Alex Stanton
- A Rather English Marriage (1998, TV movie) as Dogleg
- After the War (1987, TV series) as a child
- Maurice (1987, Merchant Ivory Productions) as the young Maurice
- A Christmas Carol (1984), as Michael Cratchit. The made-for-television movie also starred his real-life mother, Susannah York.
- The Ploughman's Lunch, (1983, Channel 4 TV film) from a screenplay by Ian McEwen
