= Lauren O'Neil =

British actress

Lauren O'Neil Is a British stage, screen and radio actress.

== Early life ==
O'Neil was born Lauren Frances Rogers in Liverpool, England, the eldest daughter of two dentists. She left Liverpool to attend the University of Glasgow, before returning to Liverpool to complete an English degree. It was there that she first took up acting.

O'Neil attended the Guildhall School of Music and Drama, graduating in 2009.

In 2017, she married Ollie Clueit, bassist of Meanwhile, Back in Communist Russia....

== Career ==
On graduating from Guildhall, O'Neil was awarded the 2009 Spotlight Showcase prize for Best Actress.

O'Neil's professional debut was as the character Kirsty in a Series 2 episode of BBC drama Being Human. Her stage debut came at the National Theatre where she played Bianca in Marianne Elliot's revival of Women Beware Women. Her first feature film lead was as Nina in The Abominable Snowman (originally Deadly Descent).

In July 2011 she became the face of the Match.com advertising campaign, in "The Girl On The Platform". O'Neil and her Match.com advert co-star, Steven Mitchell, also appear in the music video for 'She Began To Dance' sung by Matthew P. The music video shows the couple in similar but not identical outfits leaving the unidentified train station and going on a date to the beach. This suggests the advert and the music video were not filmed at the same time. Matthew P plays most of the 'characters' in the video whilst simultaneously singing his song with a ukulele.

In 2012 O'Neil appeared in two premieres at the National Theatre: in Nicholas Wright's Travelling Light and James Graham's This House.

In 2014 O'Neil appeared in King Lear alongside Frank Langella and in Richard III with Martin Freeman, playing Regan and Lady Anne respectively. In 2015 she appeared in a 2-part episode "Squaring the Circle" in Series 18 of BBC One's Silent Witness as young City DI Sarah Parks. She played Rowena in the Midsomer Murders season 18 finale 'Harvest of Souls'.

She appeared as Steph in the UK premiere of Neil LaBute's Reasons to be Happy at The Hampstead Theatre in 2016, followed by the West End transfers of This House at the Garrick Theatre and The Twilight Zone, directed by Richard Jones, at the Ambassadors Theatre, along with television roles in No Offence, comedy pilot, Bugsplat!, Father Brown, London Kills, Casualty, Grace and Queens of Mystery.

In 2022, O'Neil played Romaine Vole in Witness For The Prosecution at London County Hall.

In 2023, she originated the role of Angie in the world premiere of James Graham's adaptation of Alan Bleasdale's Boys from the Blackstuff at Liverpool's Royal Court, and its subsequent transfer to the National Theatre and the West End in 2024.

O'Neil joined the cast of Stranger Things: The First Shadow as Virginia Creel in the West End in 2024.
