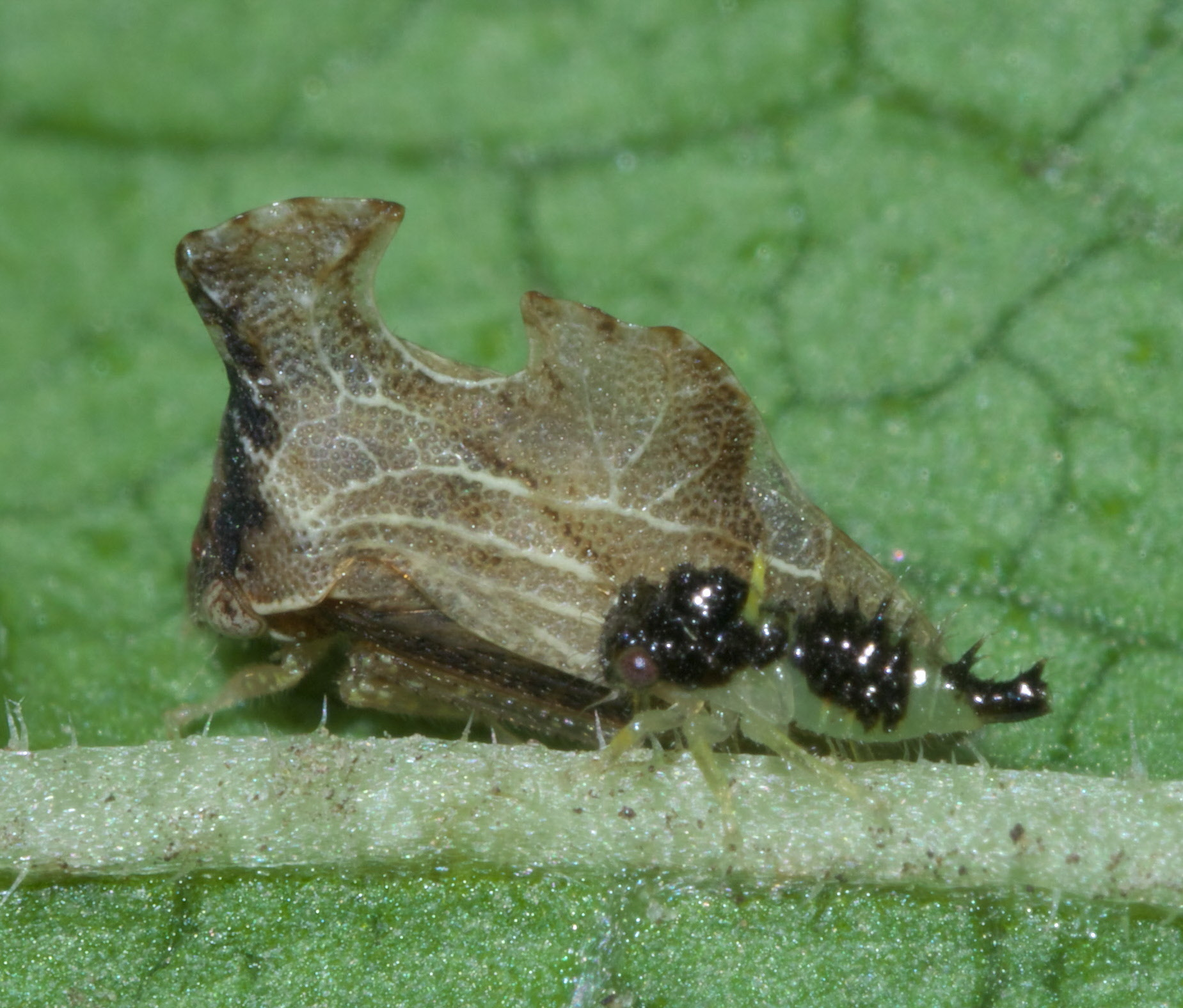

Scientific classification
- Domain: Eukaryota
- Kingdom: Animalia
- Phylum: Arthropoda
- Class: Insecta
- Order: Hemiptera
- Suborder: Auchenorrhyncha
- Family: Membracidae
- Subfamily: Smiliinae
- Genus: Entylia; Germar, 1833

= Entylia =

Genus of true bugs

Entylia is a genus of treehoppers in the family Membracidae. There are at least three described species in Entylia.

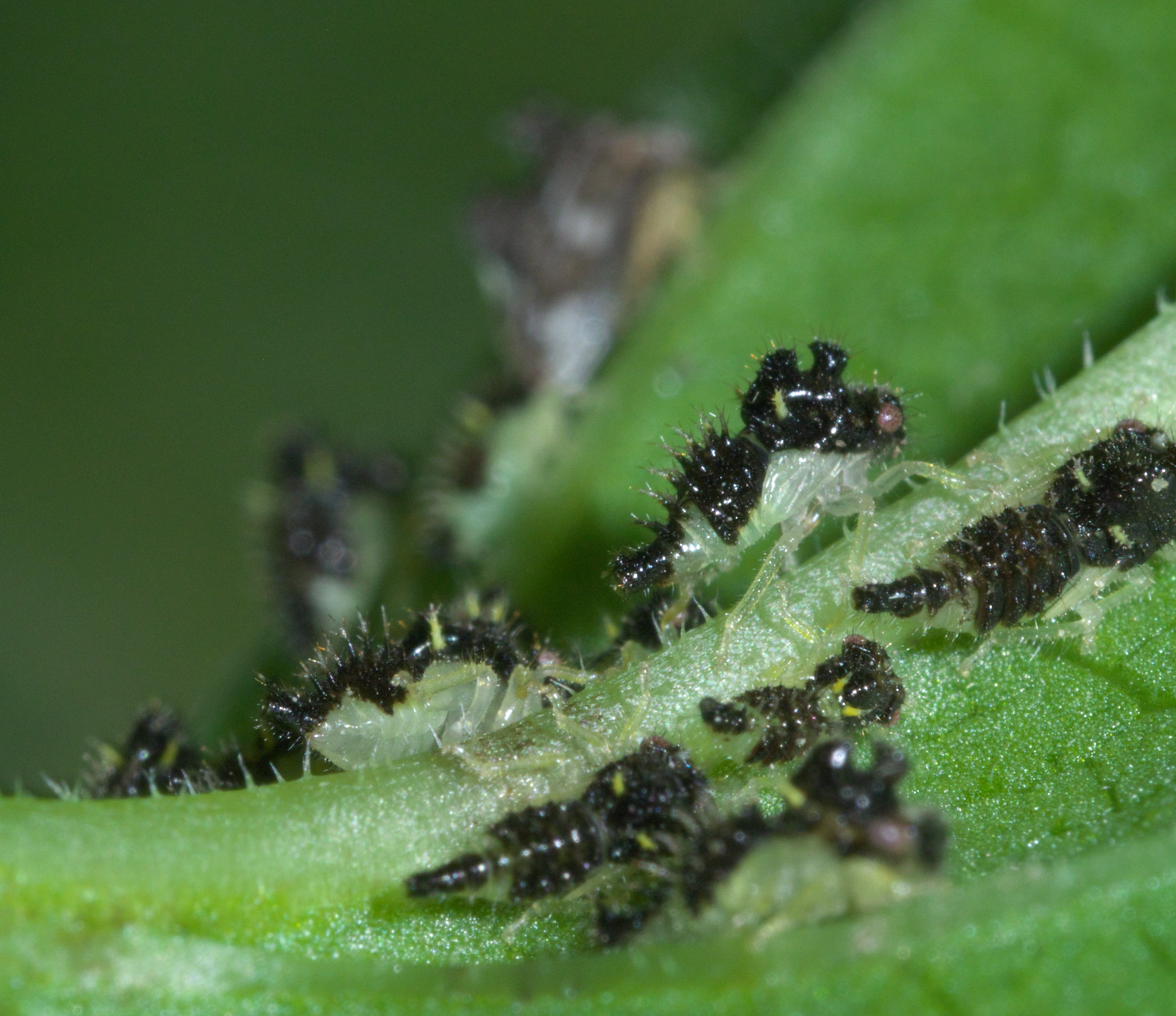

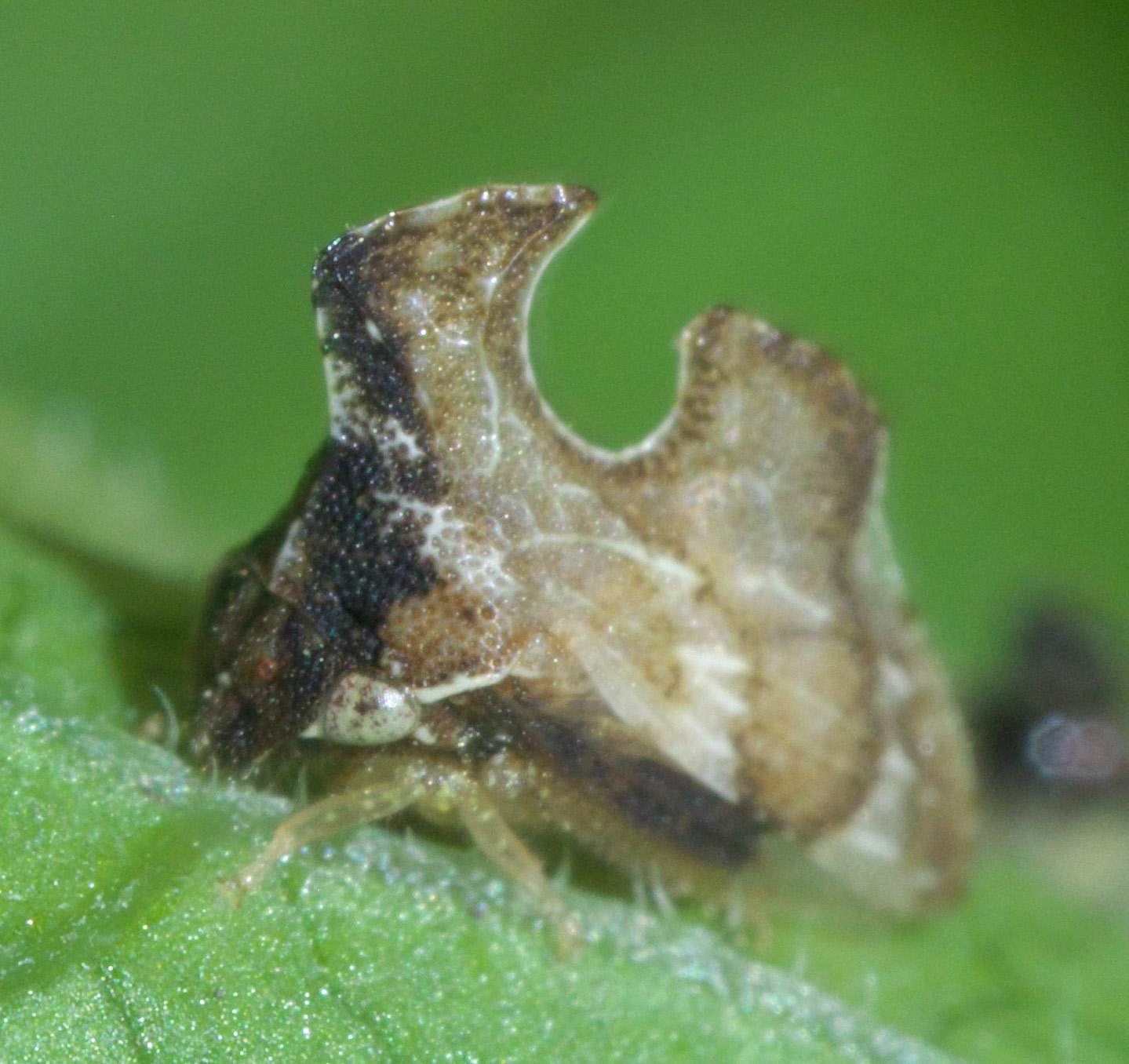

== Species ==
These three species belong to the genus Entylia:

- Entylia carinata (Forster, 1771)^{c g b}
- Entylia emarginata^{b}
- Entylia turrita^{b}

Data sources: i = ITIS, c = Catalogue of Life, g = GBIF, b = Bugguide.net
