= This House (play) =

Play by James Graham

- Original language: English
- Written by: James Graham

Premiere
- Date: 18 September 2012
- Place: Cottesloe Theatre; London

This House is a play by James Graham, that depicts politics in the British parliament between 1974 and 1979. It received its première in the Cottesloe Theatre at the Royal National Theatre from 18 September to 1 December 2012 in a production directed by Jeremy Herrin. In February 2013 it transferred to the larger Olivier Theatre where it continued to play with much critical acclaim to packed houses until May 2013. The music was composed by Stephen Warbeck, with Jim Hustwit as musical director.

The show was revived at the Minerva Theatre, Chichester from 23 September to 29 October 2016 before it received its West End debut at the Garrick Theatre where it ran from 19 November 2016 to 25 February 2017.

A UK tour began on 23 February 2018 at the West Yorkshire Playhouse.

In May 2019 the play was voted Play of the Decade in Bloomsbury Publishing's '60 Years of Modern Plays' public vote.

It derives its title from the name given to the House of Commons by MPs. The action takes place in the period in British parliamentary history between the February 1974 general election and the 1979 vote of no confidence in the government of James Callaghan. The play is set in the Palace of Westminster mainly in the offices of the Labour and Conservative Chief Whips. Party leaders such as Ted Heath, Harold Wilson, James Callaghan, Jeremy Thorpe and Margaret Thatcher remain offstage characters (though Liberal leader David Steel is depicted). The narrative concentrates on the relationships between the two sets of whips (the so-called usual channels), and between the whips, their backbenchers and the members of the minor parties.

Although the play is based on real events, it is neither a documentary nor a biography, but a fictionalised account of a turbulent period in British politics. Conversations are imagined, characters have been changed, incidents added and the time line adjusted.

== Summary ==
This House is based on true events that occurred between 1974 and 1979 in the House of Commons. These years involved very tense periods in Parliament, with the Labour and Conservative whips working hard to defend and remove the Government respectively. The February 1974 election had produced a 'hung parliament' (where no party has a majority to govern and pass laws). This deadlock led to the October 1974 general election, where the incumbent Labour government gained a majority of 1 seat – meaning that whips had to ensure every Labour MP voted whenever the Government needed to win a vote (which might have happened multiple times a day). This situation got more difficult between October 1974 and March 1979 as the Labour government lost MPs in by-elections and defections to other parties. The government was finally defeated in a vote of no confidence – by 1 vote – in March 1979.

It is the job of parliamentary whips to win votes for their party, by tracking how many of their colleagues are going to vote and convincing (or threatening) reluctant colleagues to vote the way they want. Usually, when one member cannot be present at a division, the whips will attempt to 'pair' them, by striking an informal agreement with the opposition that one of their members will also miss the vote. As happened between 1974 and 1979, throughout the play, these relationships and pairing break down due to the tensions in the government with a small majority, or even none at all. At different times, both parties lost votes in circumstances where they felt that the other party had cheated the pairing (that is, the MP who promised not to vote had voted). Sick members were obliged to attend the House for their votes to be counted, and this was done even in circumstances where this may have contributed to their deaths. It is this tension, and the work it caused the party whips, which the play fictionalises.

== Characters and cast ==
As well as the whips listed below, MPs Audrey Wise and Alfred Broughton appear in the play.

Character	Original cast (National Theatre)	Chichester and West End cast	UK tour
Labour Whips
Bob Mellish, Labour chief whip under Harold Wilson	Phil Daniels (Andrew Frame in some performances due to Daniels' time off)	Phil Daniels	Martin Marquez
Michael Cocks, Labour chief whip under James Callaghan	Vincent Franklin	Kevin Doyle	Tony Turner
Walter Harrison, Labour deputy chief whip	Philip Glenister; (later portrayed by Reece Dinsdale when the production transferred)	Steffan Rhodri	James Gaddas
Ann Taylor, Labour whip	Lauren O'Neil	Lauren O'Neil	Natalie Grady
Joe Harper, Labour whip	Richard Ridings	David Hounslow	David Hounslow
Conservative Whips
Humphrey Atkins, Conservative chief whip	Julian Wadham	Malcolm Sinclair	William Chubb
Bernard Weatherill, Conservative deputy chief whip	Charles Edwards	Nathaniel Parker	Matthew Pidgeon
Fred Silvester, Conservative whip	Ed Hughes	Ed Hughes	Giles Cooper
Ensemble actors and Actor Musicians
	Gunnar Cauthery; Christopher Godwin; Andrew Havill; Helena Lymbery; Matthew Pidgeon; Giles Taylor; Tony Turner; Rupert Vansittart	Sarah Woodward; Peter Landi; Robert Gilbert; Christopher Godwin; Matthew Pidgeon; Orlando Wells; Giles Taylor; Tony Turner	Ian Barritt; Stephen Critchlow; Ian Houghton; Marcus Hutton; Harry Kershaw; Louise Ludgate; Geoffrey Lumb; Nicholas Lumley; Miles Richardson; Orlando Wells; Charlotte Worthing; Nadine Lee (actor musician)
