= Antheads =

- Developer: Cinemaware
- Publisher: Cinemaware
- Release: 1990
- Genre: Action-adventure
- Mode: Single-player

Antheads is an expansion pack for the computer game It Came From the Desert. It was published by Cinemaware in 1990.

== Plot summary ==
The game takes place five years after It Came From the Desert in January 1956 and expands on the possible second Ant Queen mentioned in the first game's ending. The player character is Brick Nash, a war veteran and now working as a truck driver who has stolen a detonator for an atomic bomb because his younger brother Andy is a tester for the weapon. Nash fears that the Army's then-ignorance of radiation will cause his brother and other testers to die. Nash must find evidence that will prove radiation is fatal, as well as help the town fend off the new ant army.

Brick Nash is an ex-fighter pilot who has recently returned from the Korean War, responding to a warning of thousands of potential deaths due to atomic testing in the desert outside the town of Lizard Breath.

Whereas the protagonist of the first game – Dr. Greg Bradley – was known to the people of Lizard Breath who were willing to help him, Nash is a stranger to them. Townspeople also transform into ants in front of Nash.

== Development ==
David Riordan from Cinemaware explained that "Every time we put out a game, we carefully evaluate the responses from reviewers, industry professionals and game players. Desert I was no exception. When Desert I came out and got rave reviews, won awards, sold thousands of copies and so on, we knew we had to do a follow-up. The Desert gaming environment is constructed to allow for alternative scenarios, so we didn't have to start over from scratch." Riordan also stated that "Antheads was one of eight other scenarios we couldn't include in the original Desert [...] Our programmer, Randy Platt, came up with the idea of using the original environment but layering in a new story. I loved the concept that people would turn into zombie-like creatures that would help the ants take over. It was almost like the original Desert and Antheads were one game, released in a serial fashion." Riordan also noted that "The technical crew figured out how to do it so players could buy a single disk upgrade to the original game. AntHeads took Desert to the next logical step."

== Reception ==
Reception

Review scores
Publication	Score
ACE	902
Génération 4	92%
The Games Machine (UK)	87%

In the July 1990 edition of Games International (Issue 16), John Scott found that it was too similar to the original game, noting: "More varied graphics and a complete new soundtrack would have been nice." However, Scott admitted that the low purchase price for what was essentially an add-on chapter made it a worthwhile purchase. He concluded by rating both gameplay and graphics an excellent 9 out of 10.

Mark Patterson from CU Amiga (May 1990) rated the game at 95% and recommended Antheads to anyone who owned It Came From the Desert, calling it "One of the best sequels to date."

Gary Whitta from The One (Jun 1990) rated the game at 91% and noted that "Antheads doesn't radically change It Came From The Desert. What you get is the next episode in the story – effectively the same game built around a new mystery, with new puzzles to solve and the odd gameplay tweak. But this is no bad thing, as it's precisely what Desert needed – there's no need to change the core gameplay drastically, as it works brilliantly already."

Phil South form ACE (Advanced Computer Entertainment) (Jun 1990) declared that Antheads is "a better game than the original in my view, if only for the scary ant transformation sequence", and felt that people who had not even played the original game would enjoy it: "If anything it's an incentive to buy the original, just to play this version as well."

The Games Machine (Jun 1990) said that "If you liked the original, you'll love this cos it's more of the same."

Zzap!64 praised the story and declared that the gameplay was "different enough to justify the price".

== See also ==
- 1990 in video gaming
