= Marko Mäkilaakso =

Finnish music video and film director

- Born: 23 February 1978; Hämeenlinna, Finland
- Other name: Mark Hillvalley
- Occupations: Film director Music video director

Marko Mäkilaakso (also known as Mark Hillvalley; born 23 February 1978) is a Finnish music video and film director.

== Career ==
He has directed music videos for Uniklubi, Tiktak, Antti Tuisku, Indica and Robin, among others. Uniklubi's music video "Huomenna" won the Best Domestic Music Video prize at the 2005 Emma Awards and Indica's music video "Vuorien taa" was nominated for Best Music Video at the 2005 Muuvi Awards.

His first feature film, War of the Dead, was released in 2011, and after that, Mäkilaakso directed the Syfy-produced television film, Deadly Descent: The Abominable Snowman, also released under the title Yeti. In 2014, Mäkilaakso was supposed to direct fourth film of The Asylum's the Mega Shark series, Mega Shark vs. Kolossus, but shortly before the start of shooting, he abandoned the project, and instead, Mäkilaakso directed his next film, the 2018 action film It Came from the Desert, based on the 1989 video game by the same name. In 2019, Mäkilaakso directed episodes for the third season of the Bordertown series.

In 2021 Mäkilaakso was producing a horror comedy The Creeps, starring Christopher Lambert. and Joe Dante.

== Selected filmography ==
- War of the Dead (2011)
- Yeti (2013) (also known as Deadly Descent: The Abominable Snowman)
- It Came From the Desert (2018)
- Helsinki Syndrome (2022)
- The Creeps (2025)
