= Deadly Descent: The Abominable Snowman =

- Film poster
- Directed by: Marko Mäkilaakso
- Written by: Nate Atkins
- Starring: Chuck Campbell; Adrian Paul; Lauren O'Neil
- Cinematography: Lorenzo Senatore
- Music by: Christopher Holden
- Distributed by: Syfy
- Release date: United States: 26 January 2013
- Running time: 85 min
- Country: United States
- Language: English

Deadly Descent: The Abominable Snowman (also known as Deadly Descent, The Abominable Snowman or Yeti) is a 2013 action horror television film directed by Marko Mäkilaakso and starring Chuck Campbell, Adrian Paul, Lauren O'Neil, Nicholas Boulton, Elizabeth Croft and Sean Teale. In the film, Nina (Lauren O'Neil) leads her friends, a group of skilled skiers, on a rescue mission to find her missing brother, but they come face to face a deadly, ravenous creature lurking amid the peaks. The film was shot in Bulgaria.

== Plot ==
In 1992, a group of backcountry skiers led by Jake Tanner ascends Glacier Peak, one of the most remote mountains in the Cascade Range, and disappears without a trace. Years later, Jake's son, Brian, is determined to find the truth behind his father's disappearance. As Brian searches the mountain, he follows tracks that lead into a ravine, where he is attacked by a large, unidentified creature. Back home, Brian's sister, Nina, becomes worried when her brother fails to return. She visits his home and finds maps and ski gear, indicating that Brian had gone to Glacier Peak. Nina contacts a rescue team, but both rescuers are killed by the same creature that attacked Brian. Desperate for help, Nina goes to a local bar, where she meets Rick, a potential love interest. She informs him of Brian's strange behavior and his trip to Glacier Peak. Soon after, they are joined by Erlander, Jon, and Stacey, who also express concern. At the bar, they meet Mark Hagerty, the pilot who flew Brian to the mountain. Together, they decide to search for Brian.

Mark flies them to Glacier Peak. As they descend the mountain, they are caught in an avalanche. Jon, attempting to outrun the snow, falls into a ravine and suffers injuries. Rick descends to rescue him, but as they attempt to help Jon, the creature attacks, killing him. The survivors flee the ravine and take refuge in an abandoned resort, where they unexpectedly find Brian. He has been hiding there, waiting for an opportunity to kill the creature that attacked him and killed his father. Brian explains the history of the resort, which was built by a man named Skinner, who disappeared in 1954. Since then, there have been sightings of a mysterious creature in the area. Brian, who witnessed the creature years earlier, never believed the official account of his father's disappearance and returned to the mountain to seek revenge. When Rick asks about the creature, Brian describes it as a carnivorous beast more than 8 ft (2.4 m) tall, weighs between 600 and 700 lb (270 and 320 kg), is equipped with sharp teeth and claws, unbelievable agility, immunity to harsh weather conditions, and instinctively knows how to stalk unsuspecting prey.

Tensions rise when Rick insists on leaving, but Brian refuses, determined to finish his mission. Their argument attracts the creature, which breaks into the resort and injures Erlander. The group barricades the doors and attempts to defend themselves, but Rick runs out of ammunition. They attempt to escape through a hidden back door but encounter a second monster. Barely making it back inside, they find themselves trapped again. Meanwhile, Mark returns to his boss, Wayne, and admits he flew the skiers to Glacier Peak. Wayne, angry and concerned about liability, threatens to fire Mark, but Mark insists on ensuring the skiers' safety. Back at the resort, the group prepares for another attack. Erlander, feeling guilty for Jon's death, grabs Brian's gun and blames Rick. However, the monsters return, forcing the group to retreat into a kitchen, where they find weapons to defend themselves. During the struggle, Erlander sacrifices himself, allowing the others to escape to a boiler room.

The group discovers hidden weapons in the boiler room and devises a plan to fight back. They confront the creatures outside, where Stacey is killed in the ensuing battle. The remaining survivors manage to trap and kill one monster but must flee as the second one continues to pursue them. They reach a cliff, where Brian and Nina cross, but Rick is injured and unable to follow. Rick throws a grenade and stays behind, triggering an avalanche to stop the creature. However, the monster survives the blast. In a final confrontation, Brian attempts to fight the creature while Nina heads for Mark's helicopter. Despite his efforts, Brian is killed. As Nina reaches the helicopter, the creature follows her. During the ensuing struggle, Rick, who had survived, throws a grenade into the monster's mouth, killing it as it falls from the helicopter and explodes. Nina and Rick are the sole survivors, rescued by Mark as they leave Glacier Peak.

== Cast ==
- Chuck Campbell as Brian Tanner
- Adrian Paul as Mark Haggarty
- Lauren O'Neil as Nina Tanner
- Nicholas Boulton as Rick McCabe
- Elizabeth Croft as Stacey
- Sean Teale as Erlander
- Sam Cassidy as Jon
- Jesse Steele as Peter
- Hristo Balabanov as Mountain Rescuer 1
- Vladimir Mihaylov as Mountain Rescuer 2 (as Vlado Mihaylov)
- Atanas Srebrev as Wayne
- Zara Dimitrova as Bartender

== Production ==
The film is said to have been shot in 13 days.

== Reception ==
The film received largely negative reviews, including one from The Movie Scene, which criticized its release and title history as well as inconsistencies in the plot: "One thing you can't criticize this movie for not having is names, I have seen it called Deadly Descent, Abominable Snowman, the combination of the two Deadly Descent: The Abominable Snowman and even the even longer Deadly Descent: The Legend of the Abominable Snowman. What you also can't criticize Deadly Descent for is lack of back story as it starts with two climbers having a run in with a monster on the mountain, another skier/ snowboarder hitting the mountain and finding tracks and then a group of climbers going up there whilst a pilot hits the bottle in the bar. Even more amazing is the fact that all these things tie together and you need to pay attention to pick up on the connections."

An extensive entry in Ski Films: A Comprehensive Guide found the film mediocre.

== See also ==
- War of the Dead, by the same director
- Yeti in films and television
