= It Came From the Desert (film) =

- Film poster
- Directed by: Marko Mäkilaakso
- Written by: Marko Mäkilaasko; Hank Woon, Jr.
- Release dates: September 2017 (Fantasy Filmfest); 9 July 2018
- Running time: 87 min
- Countries: Finland; United Kingdom; Canada
- Language: English

It Came From the Desert is a 2017 film directed by Marko Mäkilaakso. It is based on the video game of the same name developed for Amiga computers in the 1980s.

== Plot ==
Brian is a shy young man overshadowed by his best friend Lukas, a fanatical and somewhat crazy motocross rider. Brian is looking forward to a trip to the desert, not only because he can meet his great idol, The Eradicator, a character in a movie series, but also because Lukas has invited Lisa, whom Brian has been attracted to for a long time. The three of them set off for the desert, but Brian thinks Lisa has a crush on Lukas.

This leads to embarrassing scenes at the desert festival, and Brian disappears. Lukas finds his friend and is about to convince him to go back when they discover a secret underground laboratory. They enter the facility and are promptly attacked by a human-sized giant ant. They call Lisa for help, and she manages to kill one of the ants. They come across a video message from Dr Renard, who explains that he led experiments that failed and that it is essential to keep the ants away from ethanol. All partiers at the festival are kidnapped by giant ants.

Brian, Lukas and Lisa decide to stop the ants but are separated. On the run, Lisa and Brian get closer. Just as they are about to kiss, Lisa is kidnapped by an ant. Brian and Lukas find the ants' nest and realize that the humans are still alive but are to be used as food for the ant babies. They find a way to free Lisa and now try to destroy the ants with super weapons they found in the laboratory. They then want to wipe out the brood with fire. They manage to destroy the ant queen, defeat the remaining ants, free the humans and smoke out the nest.

== Cast ==
- Harry Lister Smith as Brian
- Alex Mills as Lukas
- Vanessa Grasse as Lisa
- Mark Arnold as Dr. Renard
- Callum McGowan as Tim Guarisco
- Andrew Horton as Craig Guarisco

== Production ==
The film is based on a 1980s video game, which, according to the director, "in turn was motivated by the giant creature feature craze infesting 1950s Hollywood."

== Reception ==
Empire sees in this film an example of what can be called the "Nordic genre invasion." The Hollywood News praised the film in the following terms: "Camp, cheesy and oddly charming, It Came From the Desert is a rare modern b-movie that is an absolute viewing pleasure. It's such an entertaining watch that it should be watched with as big an audience as possible for maximum fun." A comparable assessment can be found in various reviews.

== See also ==
- Them!
