= War of the Dead =

- Pre-release poster as Stone's War
- Directed by: Marko Mäkilaakso
- Starring: Andrew Tiernan; Mikko Leppilampi
- Music by: Neal Acree, Joel Goldsmith
- Release date: 22 October 2011 (Toronto After Dark)
- Running time: 85 minutes
- Countries: United States; Lithuania; Italy
- Language: English
- Budget: €1.3 million

War of the Dead (also known as Stone's War) is a 2011 action horror film written and directed by Marko Mäkilaakso and starring Andrew Tiernan, Mikko Leppilampi, Jouko Ahola, Samuli Vauramo, Andreas Wilson, Mark Wingett, and Antti Reini.

== Plot ==
In a long corridor of an underground bunker, several prisoners are marching under armed guard. As they approach the door at the end of the corridor, one prisoner seizes his chance to assault a guard, but the door opens almost immediately and several German soldiers step through to mow down the entire group, save for one prisoner who remains standing. The guards grab him and force him through the door, where he is placed on an operating table and held down as a drip is inserted into his arm and blood pumped into his veins. He stops moving for a short time before his eyes blink open revealing his irises have become zombified-white.

Sometime later, supposedly in 1941, so presumably during the Continuation War, American Captain Martin Stone is leading a finely-trained, elite platoon of American and Finnish soldiers along with a cameraman and his son as they are sent to attack the bunker, with no knowledge of its secrets. Underestimating their enemy's strength, they are quickly beaten back into the forest. As they try to regroup, they spy a soldier sloping towards them. Identifying him as a threat, they open fire, but as they investigate his corpse it is revealed the soldier is one of their own dead from the previous encounter, and as he springs to life a second time a number of zombies leap into action from their hiding places in the trees to further destroy the unit.

Forced to flee the battle to survive, Stone along with Finns Captain Niemi and Lieutenant Laakso as well as the cameraman's son take refuge in a trench, where they encounter lone Russian soldier Kolya, who seems aware of the zombie presence and leads them to a house where they can shelter. They are rapidly split up and attacked, however, with Niemi being bitten and then killing the young cameraman before being gunned down by Laakso. Meanwhile, Stone finds a car in the garage before being saved by Kolya, who shows impressive hand-to-hand combat skills.

As the three survivors drive into the forest, they are attacked again by Niemi, but manage to escape him relatively easily. Stopping at another cabin, the three survivors bicker about whether to confront the supernatural threat or leave it behind, before they find Kolya's ex-girlfriend Dasha. The four then proceed on to the bunker, where Kolya insists they can find a radio to call for help. Entering the facility, they are again split up - as Kolya finds Dasha mortally wounded, having to shoot her in the head to prevent her from turning, Laakso and Stone find the living remnants of the German garrison. As Stone stays behind to cover Laakso, the Finn is reunited with Kolya and the two find the radio room, where they call headquarters to call in an airstrike to take the bunker out for good.

Niemi appears again at the bunker and engages in a fist-fight with Stone, while the radio room is overrun by zombies and Laakso and Kolya are forced to flee. As they near the exit to the surface, Kolya is grabbed by a zombie and falls to his death, with Laakso forced to leave him as he races topside to set the signal flares for the incoming fighter-bombers. Narrowly escaping the bombs, Laakso meets up with Stone again as they surrender to the incoming Russian battalion which has been called to investigate the site, knowing their job is done.

== Cast ==
- Andrew Tiernan as Martin Stone
- Mikko Leppilampi as Lieutenant Laakso
- Samuli Vauramo as Kolya
- Jouko Ahola as Kapteeni Niemi
- Mark Wingett as Selzman
- Andreas Wilson as Assistant
- Antti Reini as Sergeant Halonen
- Magdalena Gorska as Dasha

== Production ==
Production took over eight years, with many changes in both cast and crew. It was originally titled Stone's War, starring James Van Der Beek.

Production occurred in Lithuania, at a cost of €1.3 million (US$1.8 million), making it the most expensive film ever made in Lithuania.

== Release ==
The world premiere was at the Toronto After Dark Film Festival on 22 October 2011.

== Reception ==
The National found the film to be a "trashy but superior B-movie" and that it was "low on actual horror but full of slick production touches and plenty of pulse-racing, flesh-chomping action." Variety called it one-dimensional and unmemorable"

Fangoria referred to the film as "an extremely impressive debut", give it a three out of four rating.

== See also ==
- Deadly Descent: The Abominable Snowman
