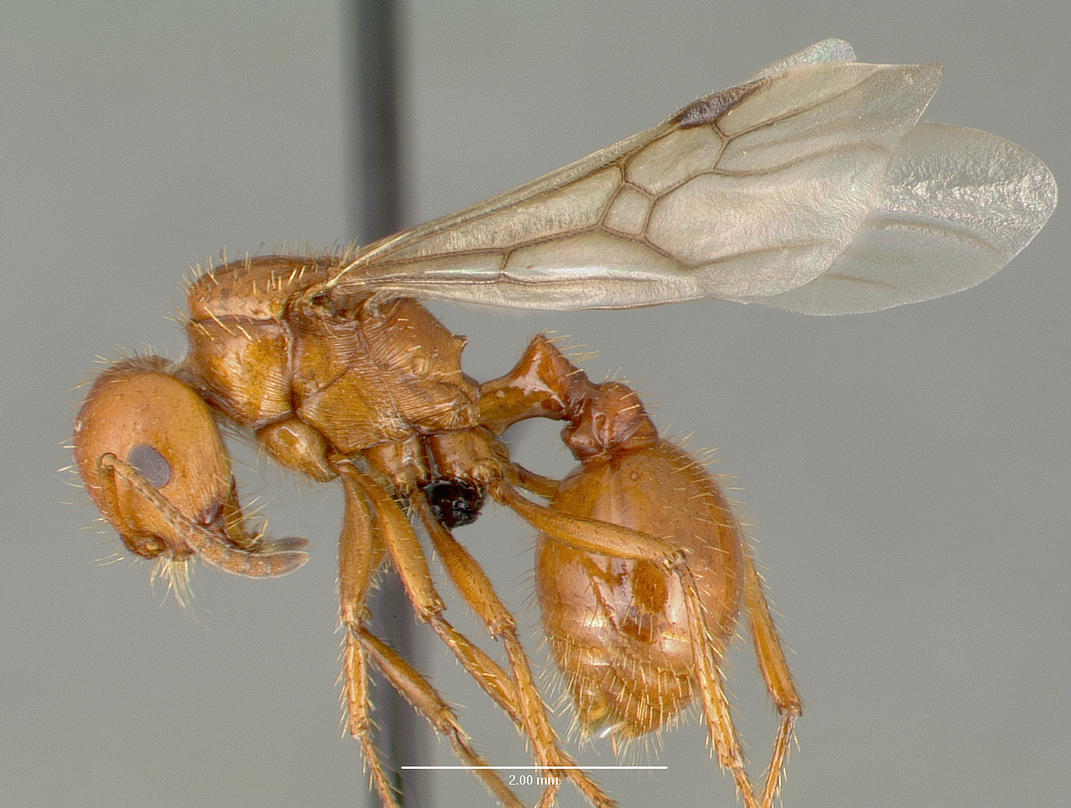
- P. anergismus alate queen from New Mexico

Conservation status
- Vulnerable (IUCN 2.3)

Scientific classification
- Kingdom: Animalia
- Phylum: Arthropoda
- Class: Insecta
- Order: Hymenoptera
- Family: Formicidae
- Subfamily: Myrmicinae
- Genus: Pogonomyrmex
- Species: P. anergismus

Binomial name
- Pogonomyrmex anergismus Cole, 1954

= Pogonomyrmex anergismus =

Species of ant

Pogonomyrmex anergismus is a species of workerless inquiline ant in the subfamily Myrmicinae native to Arizona, New Mexico, and Texas that parasitizes Pogonomyrmex rugosus and Pogonomyrmex barbatus nests.
