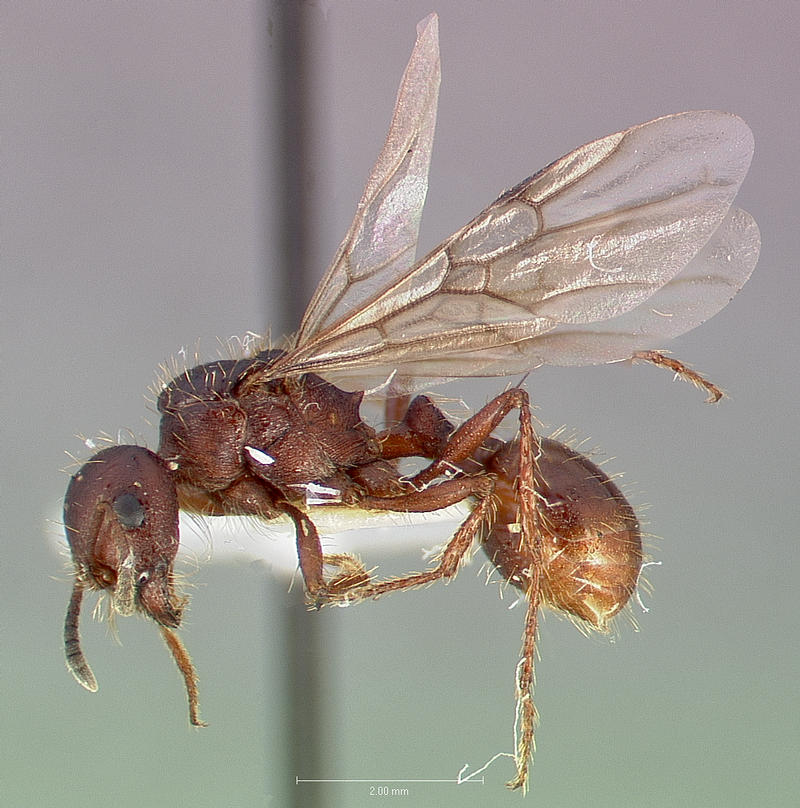
- P. colei alate queen from Nevada

Conservation status
- Vulnerable (IUCN 2.3)

Scientific classification
- Kingdom: Animalia
- Phylum: Arthropoda
- Class: Insecta
- Order: Hymenoptera
- Family: Formicidae
- Subfamily: Myrmicinae
- Genus: Pogonomyrmex
- Species: P. colei

Binomial name
- Pogonomyrmex colei Snelling, 1982

= Pogonomyrmex colei =

Species of ant

Pogonomyrmex colei is a species of workerless inquiline ant in the subfamily Myrmicinae native to California, Nevada, and Arizona that parasitizes Pogonomyrmex rugosus nests.

== Biology ==
The genome of Pogonomyrmex colei was sequenced for a study examining how this and other parasitic ants with no worker caste may have altered their genome to arrive at a workerless state. In comparison to ants with a full complement of castes, there appeared to be no loss of genes in the parasitic ants. This suggests regulatory differences and not sequence differences predominate in gains and losses of castes.
