= Them! =

1954 science fiction giant monster film by Gordon Douglas

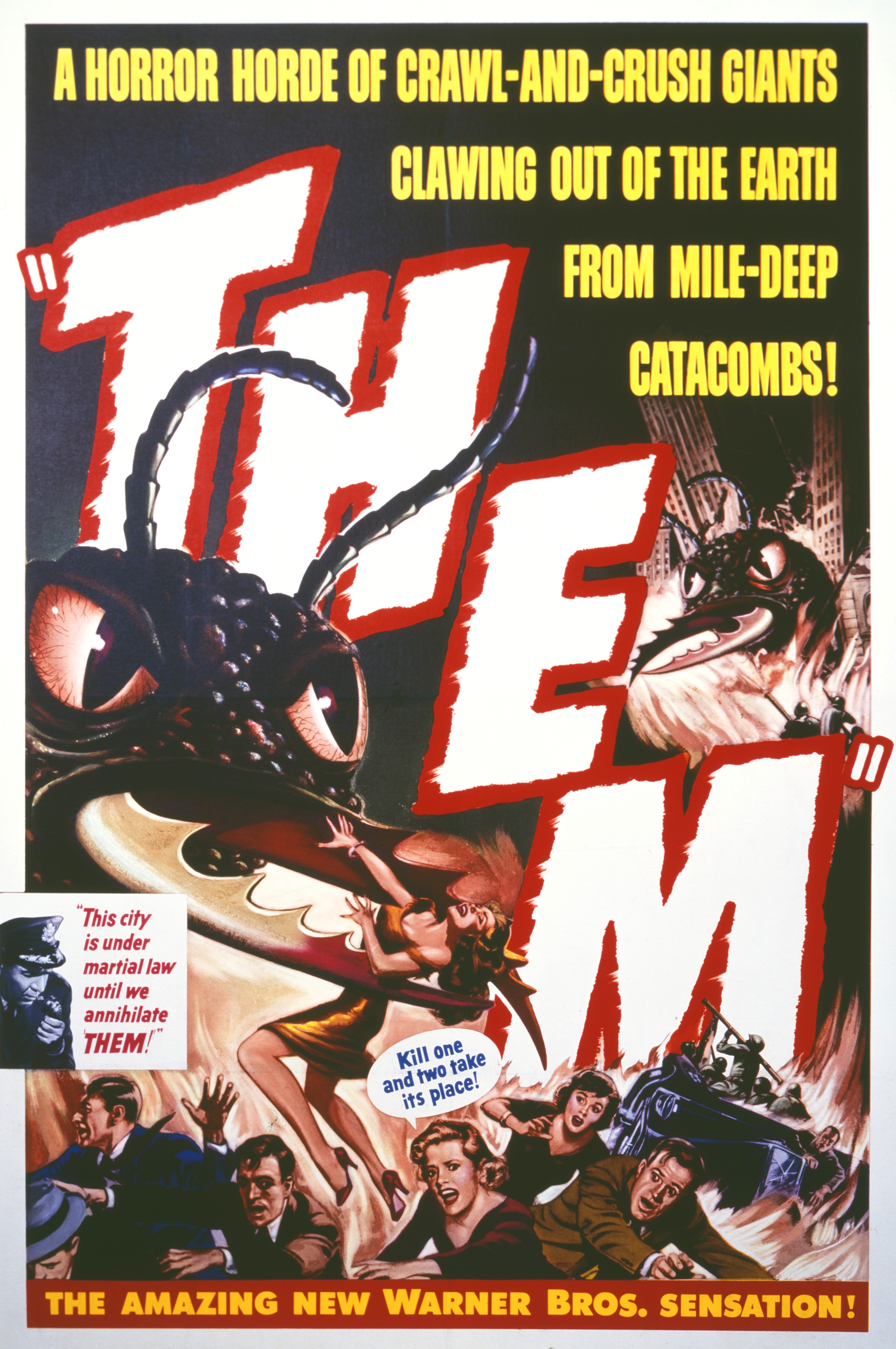
- Theatrical release poster
- Directed by: Gordon Douglas
- Screenplay by: Ted Sherdeman; Russell Hughes (adaptation)
- Story by: George Worthing Yates
- Produced by: David Weisbart
- Starring: James Whitmore; Edmund Gwenn; Joan Weldon; James Arness
- Cinematography: Sidney Hickox
- Edited by: Thomas Reilly
- Music by: Bronislau Kaper
- Distributed by: Warner Bros.
- Release dates: June 16, 1954 (New York); June 18, 1954 (United States)
- Running time: 94 minutes
- Country: United States
- Language: English
- Box office: $2.2 million (rentals)

Them! is a 1954 black-and-white science fiction giant monster film starring James Whitmore, Edmund Gwenn, Joan Weldon, and James Arness. Produced by David Weisbart, the film was directed by Gordon Douglas, based on an original story by George Worthing Yates that was developed into a screenplay by Ted Sherdeman, with adaptation by Russell Hughes.

The film is one of the first of the 1950s "nuclear monster" movies, and the first with big bugs as the threat. A nest of gigantic irradiated ants is discovered in the New Mexico desert, and they quickly become a national threat when it is found that two young queens and their consorts have escaped to establish new colonies. The national search that follows culminates in a battle with the last surviving colony in the concrete spillways and storm drain system of Los Angeles.

Critical reception was largely positive at the time of release, and Them! came to be regarded as one of the best American science fiction films of the 1950s. The film was nominated for an Academy Award in the special effects category.

== Plot ==
In 1954, New Mexico State Police Sergeant Ben Peterson and his partner, Ed Blackburn, discover a little girl wandering the desert in a catatonic state near Alamogordo, and the ravaged and abandoned travel trailer she came from a few miles away. The officers summon an ambulance for the girl, and, while the scene is processed, go to a nearby rural general store. They find it destroyed in the same way as the trailer, and the owner's dead, mutilated body in the cellar. No money was taken at either crime scene. Peterson leaves Blackburn alone to wait for backup, and Blackburn hears a strange, pulsating sound outside. He investigates, and disappears after shooting his gun at something and screaming in agony.

The owner of the trailer is found to be an FBI agent, so Agent Robert Graham is called in from the local FBI office to help Peterson. He sends a cast of a print found near the trailer to Washington, D.C., for analysis, and is surprised when he receives word that Drs. Harold and Pat Medford, father and daughter myrmecologists, are being sent by the Department of Agriculture. On an educated hunch, Harold exposes the little girl to the scent of formic acid. The odor releases her from her catatonia, leaving her shrieking in panic, "Them! Them!"

Peterson and Graham take the Medfords to where the trailer was found. While searching the area, Pat is accosted by a giant foraging ant, and Harold directs Peterson and Graham to shoot off the ant's antennae to blind it, before Peterson kills it with a submachine gun. Harold theorizes that the ants were mutated by radiation from the first atomic bomb test near Alamogordo, and have turned carnivorous from lack of a suitable food supply in the desert.

A helicopter search of the desert discovers a giant ant nest, surrounded by human remains. Cyanide gas bombs are tossed inside, and Graham, Peterson, and Pat enter to explore. At the lowest level, Pat finds evidence that two queens have hatched and flown away. Harold declares that, if the queens are allowed to establish new colonies and the ants continue to spread, mankind may cease to be Earth's dominant species within a year.

The search area is widened, though the reason for the operation is kept top secret to avoid mass panic. Graham and Pat travel to Brownsville, Texas, to interrogate a ranch foreman committed to a mental hospital after claiming he was forced down in his plane by UFOs shaped like giant ants. One ant queen is discovered to have boarded a freighter in Acapulco, Mexico, when, out in the Pacific Ocean, its offspring emerge and attack the crew. The United States Navy cruiser that responds to the distress call finds only two surviving sailors in the water, and the freighter is sunk by naval gunfire.

A report about a shipment of stolen sugar leads the investigators to a Los Angeles hospital, where a chronic alcoholic claims he has seen giant ants in the city's storm drain system. When they also trace the movements of a man whose mutilated body was found in the area back to the drains and discover another giant ant print, they are convinced that both the final missing queen and the man's two missing young sons are somewhere in the over 700 miles of tunnels under the city.

Martial law is declared in Los Angeles, and a curfew imposed. Peterson, Graham, and the Medfords help the armed forces search the drain network, and Peterson finds the boys trapped by some ants. He calls for reinforcements and is just able to lift the boys to safety before being attacked and killed. Graham arrives with backup, and the queen and her hatchlings are located. The Medfords confirm that no new queens have gotten away and sanction the destruction of the nest. Graham wonders what havoc might ensue from all of the other nuclear explosions in the past decade, and Harold responds that mankind has entered a new world, and no one can predict what we will find.

== Cast ==
- James Whitmore as Sergeant Ben Peterson of the NMSP
- Edmund Gwenn as Dr. Harold Medford of the USDA, Pat's father
- Joan Weldon as Dr. Pat Medford of the USDA, Harold's daughter
- James Arness as FBI Agent Robert Graham
- Onslow Stevens as General O'Brien of Air Force Intelligence
- Sean McClory as Major Kibbee of Air Force Intelligence
- Chris Drake as Trooper Ed Blackburn of the NMSP
- Sandy Descher as the Ellinson girl, who is found wandering alone in the New Mexico desert
- Mary Alan Hokanson (credited Mary Ann Hokanson) as Mrs. Lodge, whose two young sons are missing in Los Angeles
- Don Shelton as Captain Fred Edwards of the NMSP
- Fess Parker as Alan Crotty, foreman of the Lazy K Ranch in Brownsville, Texas
- Olin Howland (credited Olin Howlin) as Jensen, an alcoholic patient who has seen strange things in Los Angeles

Uncredited

- William Schallert as the ambulance attendant in New Mexico
- Joseph Forte as "Doc" Putnam, a county medical officer in New Mexico
- Ann Doran as the child psychiatrist
- Willis Bouchey as an official at the meetings in Washington, D.C.
- Leonard Nimoy as the Air Force Sergeant delivering paperwork
- Dick Wessel as the railroad detective in Los Angeles
- Dub Taylor as the railroad yard watchman in Los Angeles
- John Beradino as Patrolman Ryan of the LAPD
- Lawrence Dobkin as the Los Angeles city engineer

=== Cast notes ===
- Leonard Nimoy has a small, uncredited part as a U.S. Army staff sergeant in the communications room. Other actors who appear in small, uncredited parts include Booth Colman, Walter Coy, Richard Deacon, Dorothy Green, Jan Merlin, Douglas Spencer, Harry Tyler, and Harry Wilson.
- When casting his planned Davy Crockett episode of the Disneyland television series, Walt Disney viewed the film to see James Arness, who had been recommended for the title role. Disney, however, was more impressed by a scene with Fess Parker as an inmate in the mental ward of the Texas hospital. Watching Parker's performance, Disney realized he had found his Davy Crockett. John Wayne saw the film and, impressed with Arness' performance, recommended him for the role of Marshal Matt Dillon in the new Gunsmoke TV series, a role that Arness would play from 1955 to 1975.

== Production ==
Opening title card with the background in black and white and "Them!" in red and blue

When Them! began production in the fall of 1953, it was originally conceived to be in 3D and Warnercolor. During pre-production, test shots in color and 3D were made. A few color tests of the large-scale ant models were made, but, when it was time to shoot the 3D test, Warner Bros.' "All Media" 3D camera rig malfunctioned, and no footage could be filmed. The next day, a memo was sent out that the color and 3D aspects of the production were to be scrapped. While widescreen black-and-white would now be the film's presentation format, because of the preparation of certain scenes, many of the camera set-ups designed for 3D remain in the film, such as the opening titles and the flamethrower shots aimed directly at the camera.

Although Warner Bros. was dissatisfied with the color results, the film's title was printed in vivid red and blue against a black-and-white background to give the film's opening a dramatic "punch". This effect was achieved by an Eastmancolor section spliced into each release print. The 1985 release of the film on VHS tape, as well as the later LaserDisc, DVD and Blu-ray releases, have retained this black-and-white-with-two-color title effect.

The scenes set in the Chihuahuan Desert of southern New Mexico were actually filmed in the Mojave Desert near Palmdale, California. Mercy Hospital was a real institution, and is now Brownsville Medical Center. The entrance to the ants' final nest was filmed along the concrete spillways of the Los Angeles River, between the First and Seventh Street Bridges, east of downtown.

The giant ants, painted a purplish-green color, were constructed and operated by unseen technicians supervised by Ralph Ayers. During the climactic battle sequence in the Los Angeles storm drains, there is a brief shot of one ant moving in the foreground with its side removed, revealing its mechanical interior, though this filming error was obscured on the DVD and Blu-ray releases of the film.

The stridulation sounds produced by the giant ants in the film were created by mixing recordings of the calls of bird-voiced tree frogs together with recordings of the calls of a wood thrush, hooded warbler, and red-bellied woodpecker. These were recorded at Indian Island, Georgia, on April 11, 1947, by the Cornell Lab of Ornithology.

James Whitmore wore "lifts" in his shoes to compensate for the height difference between himself and James Arness. Whitmore also employed bits of "business" (hand gestures and motions) during scenes in which he appeared, in order to draw more attention to his character when not speaking.

The Wilhelm scream, created three years earlier for the film Distant Drums, is used during several of the film's action sequences. It can be heard when a sailor aboard the freighter is grabbed by an ant, when Whitmore's character is caught in an ant's mandibles, and when an overhead wooden beam falls on a soldier in the Los Angeles storm drain sequence.

The film's poster shows a gigantic ant with menacing cat-like eyes, rather than the normal compound eyes of an ant.

== Reception ==
=== Box office ===
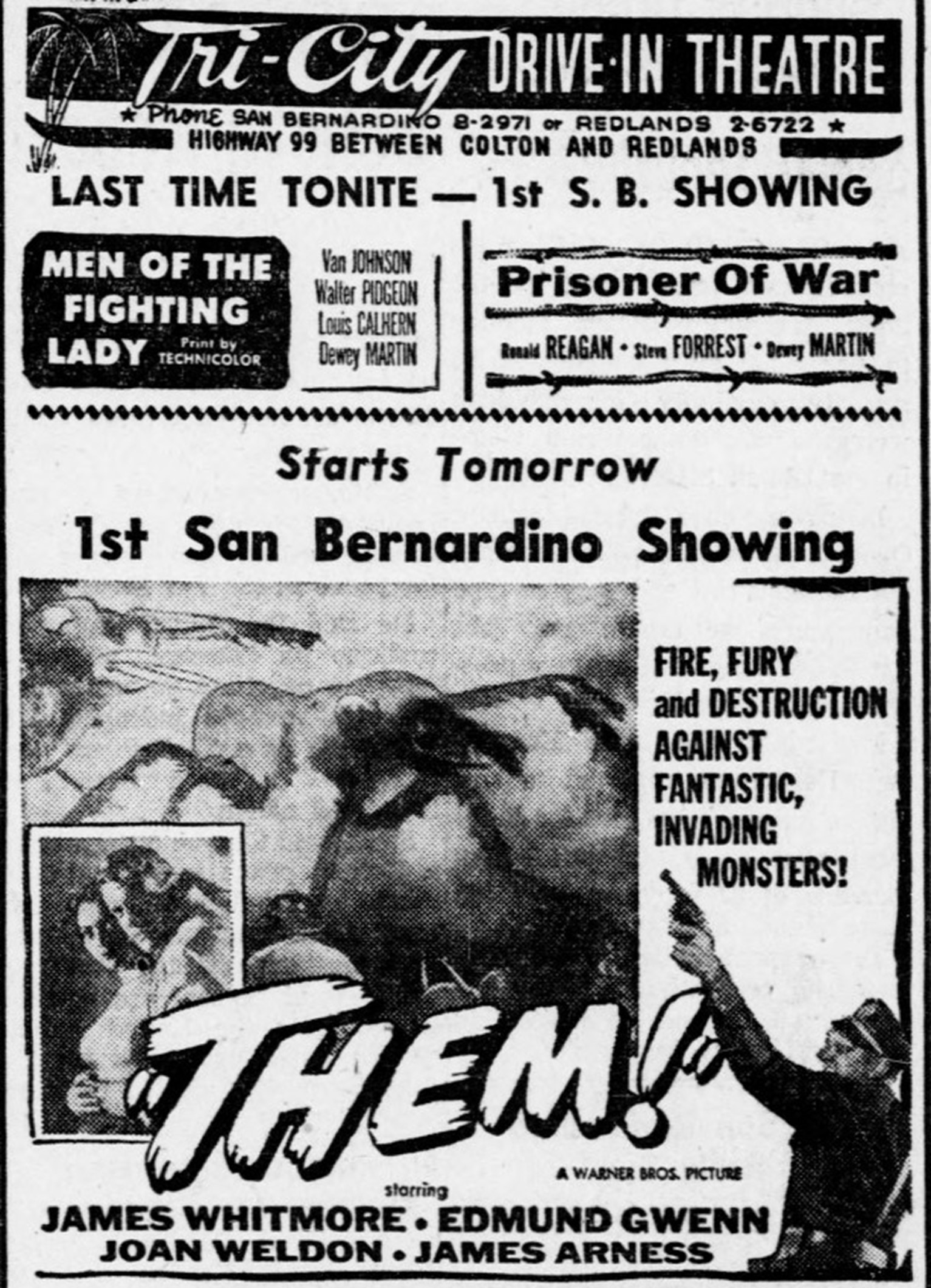
Drive-in advertisement from 1954

Them! was released in June 1954, and by the end of that year had accrued $2.2 million (US) in distributors' domestic (U.S. and Canada) rentals, making it the year's 51st biggest earner. (Note: "Rentals" refers to the distributor/studio's share of the box office gross, which, according to Gebert, is roughly half of the money generated by ticket sales.)

=== Critical response ===
A. H. Weiler's review of the film in The New York Times noted that "from the moment James Whitmore, playing a New Mexico state trooper, discovers a six-year-old moppet wandering around the desert in a state of shock, to the time when the cause of that mental trauma is traced and destroyed, Them! is taut science fiction".

The reviewer for Variety called the film a "top-notch science fiction shocker. It has a well-plotted story, expertly directed and acted in a matter-of-fact style to rate a chiller payoff and thoroughly satisfy the fans of hackle-raising melodrama".

John McCarten of The New Yorker wrote: "If you're willing to let your imagination off its leash, you may have a fairly good time at Them!"

The contemporary Monthly Film Bulletin stated that, despite the science fiction film genre being new, it had developed several sub-divisions, including "the other-worldly, the primeval-monstrous, the neo-monstrous, the planetary-visitant, etc.", and that Them! is a "well-built example of the neo-monstrous", "less absurdly sensational than most". It called the film's ant monsters "reasonably horrible--they do not entirely avoid the impression of mock-up that is almost inevitable when over-lifesize creatures have to be constructed and moved", and said they are "considerably more conceivable than those prehistoric remnants that have recently been emerging from bog and iceberg". The review also noted that, "like most science-fiction, [the film] is on the whole serviceably rather than excitingly cast", described the direction as "smoothly machined", and said the film has "decent writing", though it claimed that "more short cuts might have been [taken]", as the start of the film was too slow.

Since its original release, Them! has become generally regarded as one of the best science fiction films of the 1950s. Bill Warren described it as "tight, fast-paced and credible ... the picture is suspenseful". The entry on the film in Phil Hardy's The Aurum Film Encyclopedia: Science Fiction states: "Directed by [Gordon] Douglas in semi-documentary fashion, Them! is one of the best American science fiction films of the fifties". Danny Peary said the film "Ranks with The Thing and Invasion of the Body Snatchers as the best of the countless '50s science fiction films". In the Time Out Film Guide, David Pirie wrote: "By far the best of the 50s cycle of 'creature features' ... retains a good part of its power today".

In 2023, film scholar Foster Hirsch proposed that the picture is a subtle anti-communist allegory, pointing out that: "the ants are red, they work underground, their colony is well organized, and their numbers mushroom with alarming speed . . . the ants are pointed directly at the city where the film industry is located, an industry at the time accused with being overrun with Reds." As further evidence, he points to a scene where police are searching a ruined general store while a radio commentator in the background discusses "an unstable political situation" and asks if the "Cold War has heated up."

On the review aggregator website Rotten Tomatoes, 93% of 58 critics' reviews of the film are positive, with an average rating of 7.8/10; the site's "critics consensus" reads: "One of the best creature features of the early atomic age, Them! features effectively menacing special effects and avoids the self-parody that would taint later monster movies".

=== Awards ===
At the 27th Academy Awards, Them! was nominated for Best Special Effects, though it lost to 20,000 Leagues Under the Sea. It won a Golden Reel Award for Best Sound Editing.

== In popular culture ==
- Them! heavily inspired the 1956 Japanese kaiju film Rodan.
- Van Morrison's band Them was named after this film, though the suggestion came from keyboardist Eric Wrixon rather than Morrison himself.
- The Amiga video game series It Came from the Desert was inspired by Them!
- Cloverfield has a cameo of Them!
- Fallout 3, which takes place in a post-apocalyptic irradiated wasteland, has a side-quest involving giant mutated fire ants titled "Those!" in homage to the film.
- The scene where Pat is attacked by the foraging ant appears in the 2018 Marvel film Ant-Man and the Wasp, when Scott, Hope, and Cassie watch Them!

== See also ==
- It Came From the Desert (2017) – a film based on the 1989 Amiga video game

== Bibliography ==
- Herzberg, Bob (2007). The FBI and the Movies. Jefferson, North Carolina: McFarland & Company. ISBN 978-0-78642-755-0.
- Parish, James Robert; Pitts, Michael R. (1977). The Great Science Fiction Pictures. Jefferson, North Carolina: McFarland & Company. ISBN 978-0-81081-029-7.
- Smith, Dave (2012). Disney Trivia from the Vault: Secrets Revealed and Questions Answered. New York: Disney Press. ISBN 978-1-4231-7857-6.
- Strick, Philip (1976). Science Fiction Movies. London: Octopus Books Limited. ISBN 0-7064-0470-X.
- Warren, Bill (1982). Keep Watching the Skies! American Science Fiction Movies of the Fifties, Vol. 1: 1950-1957. Jefferson, North Carolina: McFarland & Company. ISBN 0-89950-032-3.
