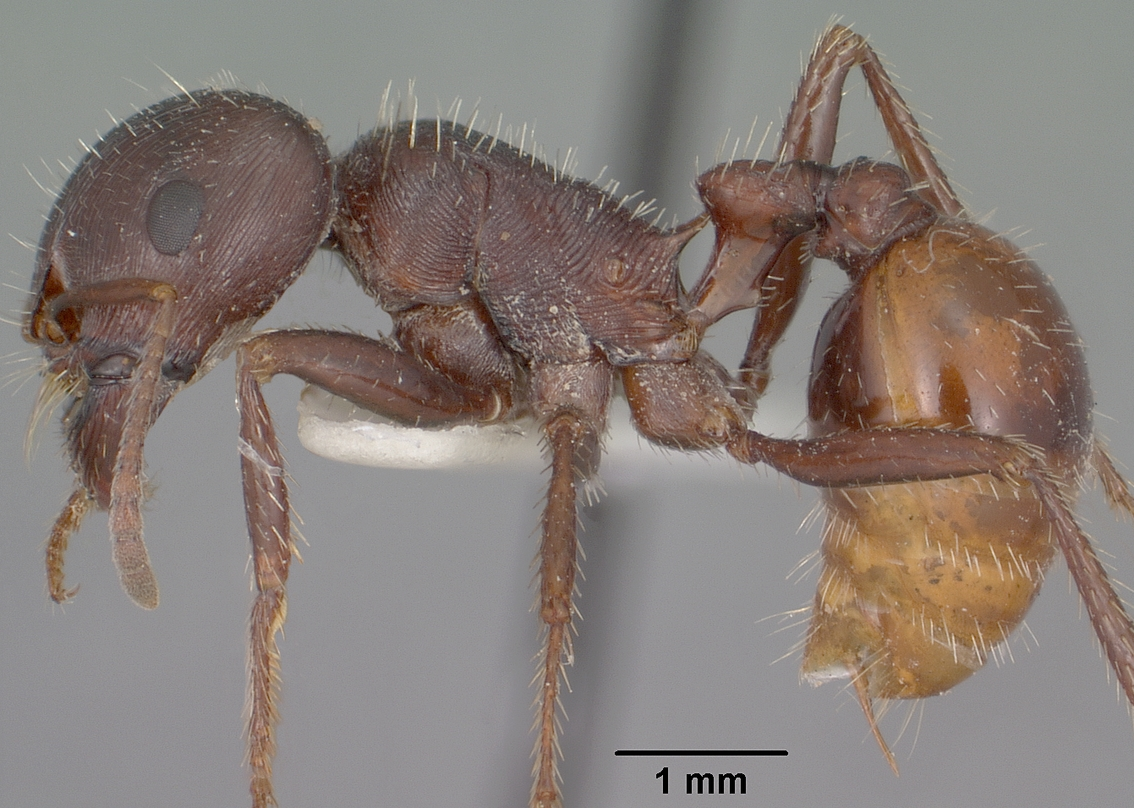
- from New Mexico
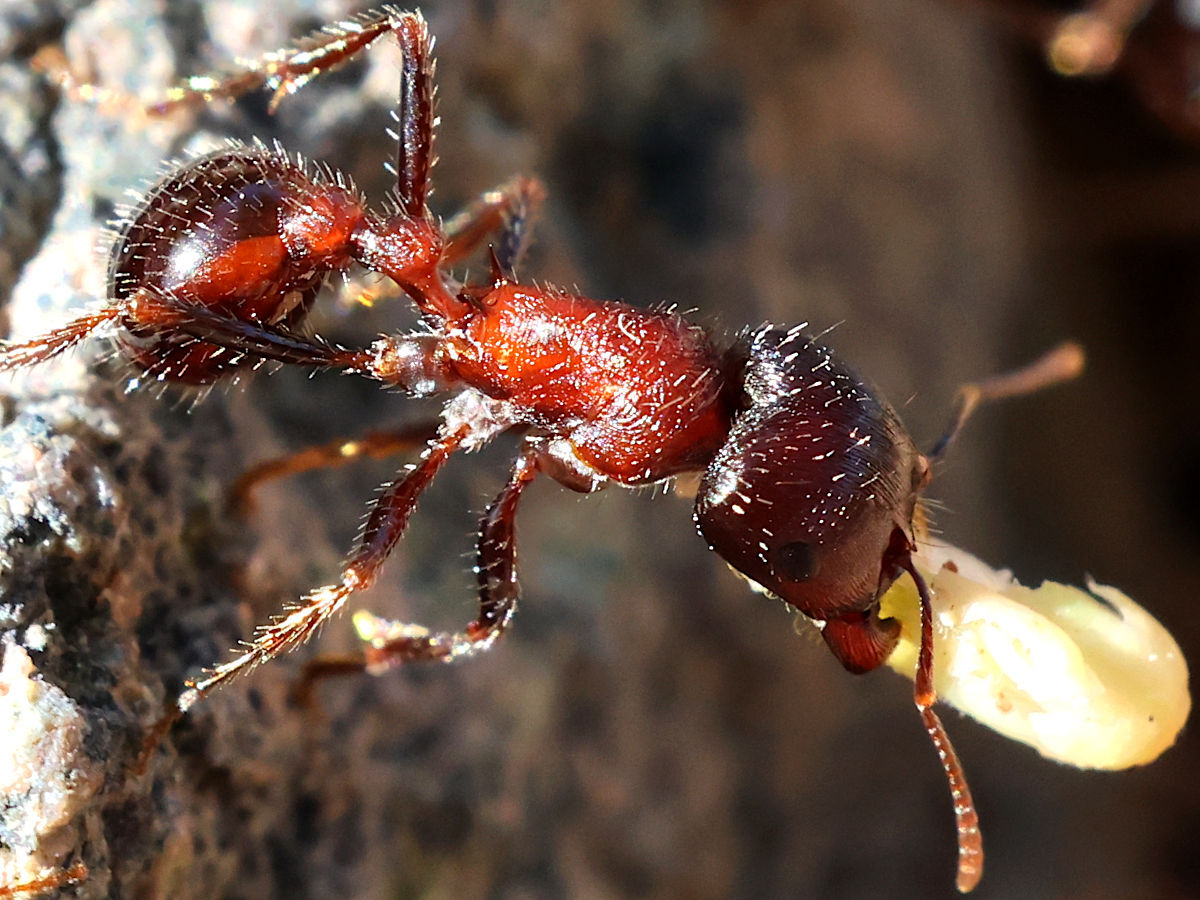
- from Arizona

Scientific classification
- Kingdom: Animalia
- Phylum: Arthropoda
- Clade: Pancrustacea
- Class: Insecta
- Order: Hymenoptera
- Family: Formicidae
- Subfamily: Myrmicinae
- Genus: Pogonomyrmex
- Species: P. rugosus

Binomial name
- Pogonomyrmex rugosus Emery, 1895

= Pogonomyrmex rugosus =

Species of ant

Pogonomyrmex rugosus, the desert harvester ant or rough harvester ant, is a species of harvester ant in the subfamily Myrmicinae which is found in the southwestern United States,and Northern Mexico.

== Biology ==
Pogonomyrmex rugosus can be found in open, sandy, and hot areas. They will typically forage during the day, bringing seeds back to the colony and scavenging dead insects they may find. Nests will often have a small circle around the entrance which has been cleared of foliage, making them easily recognizable.

=== Color Morphs ===
P. Rugosus has two distinct color variants. P. Rugosus found in southwestern deserts such as in California and Arizona, will feature a red and black color scheme, where as those found in more central parts of the United States and Mexico will be fully black.

=== Reproduction ===
Pogonomyrmex Rugosus will typically perform their nuptial flights from July–September, during hot daytime conditions of 80–95°F and during elevated humidity, usually after rain the previous day.

=== Colonies ===
P. rugosus colonies can grow to have up to 15,000 workers.

== Behavior ==
=== Foraging Tactics ===
P. rugosus workers use group foraging tactics that involve the creation of permanent pathways (trunk trails). They also use pheromones trails to draw other workers to areas of food-availability.

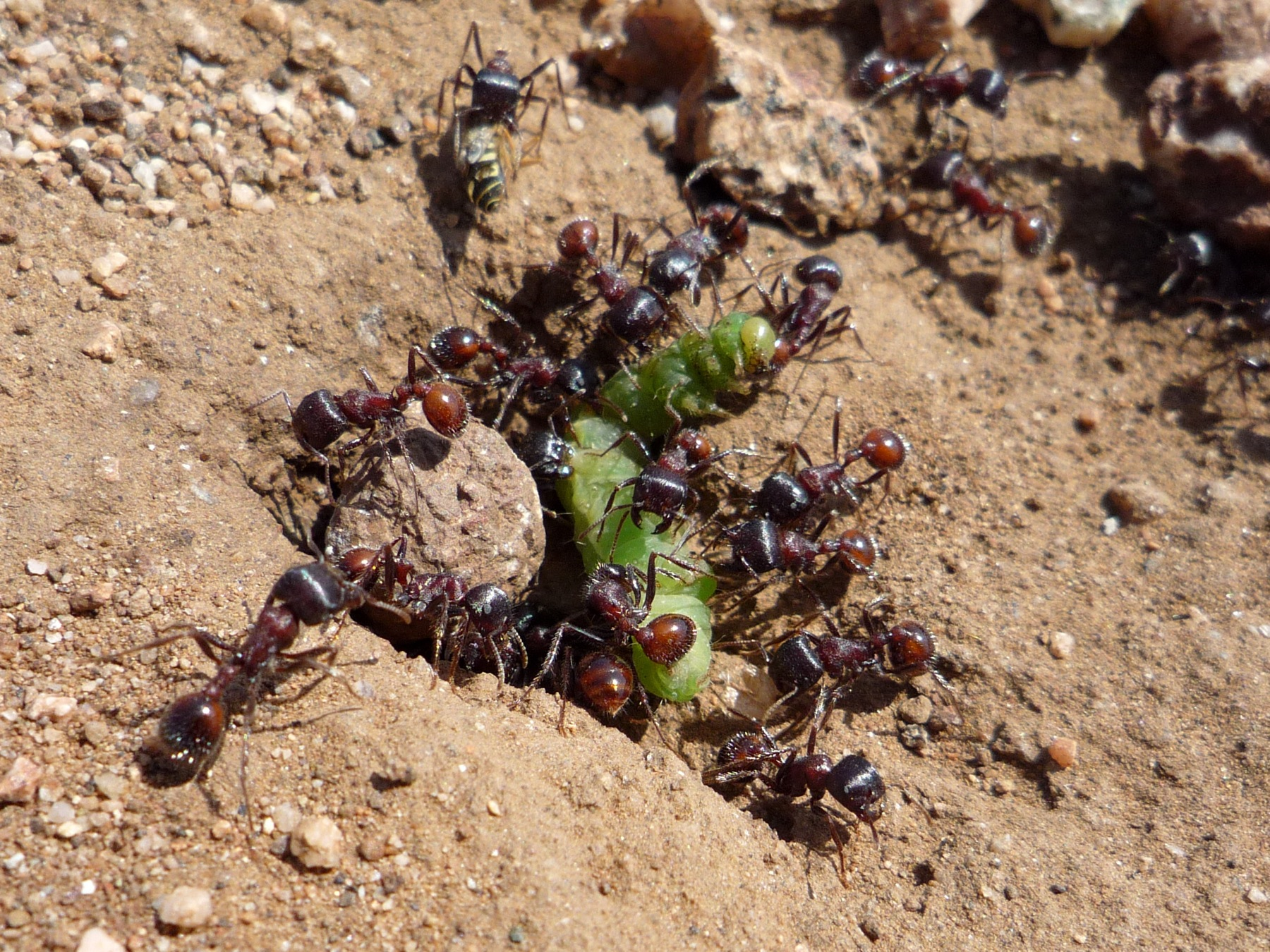
P. rugosus capturing a caterpillar

=== Interspecies Interactions ===
Two other species of harvester ants, Pogonomyrmex anergismus and Pogonomyrmex colei, have no workers of their own. Instead, they live in the colonies of P. rugosus and Pogonomyrmex barbatus (red harvester ant) and enslave workers to raise reproductive males and females for them.
