= Greater Los Angeles County Vector Control District =

Public health agency

Agency overview
- Formed: 1952
- Preceding agencies: Southeast Mosquito Abatement District (1952 - 1994); Greater Los Angeles Vector Control District (1994)
- Jurisdiction: Government of California
- Headquarters: Santa Fe Springs, California
- Employees: 92
- Agency executive: Susanne Kluh, General Manager, Greater Los Angeles County Vector Control District
- Parent agency: California Department of Public Health

The Greater Los Angeles County Vector Control District (GLACVCD) is a public health agency created in 1952 by the State of California's Health and Safety Code.

GLACVCD is an independent government entity called a special district. The organization covers over 1,000 square miles and 6 million residents in Los Angeles County and other unincorporated areas. It is one of five mosquito and vector control districts in Los Angeles County.

The vector control district's mission is to promote community health, comfort and welfare through effective and responsive vector control. This is done by performing disease surveillance, controlling vectors and conducting community outreach.

== History ==
In 1952, the Southeast Mosquito Abatement District was formed through a citizen petition aimed at controlling mosquitoes emanating from the Los Angeles River, affecting the proximate cities of Maywood, Bell, Huntington Park and portions of Los Angeles County totaling approximately 150 square miles. In 1955, a new permanent headquarters was built in the city of South Gate. District Entomologist Gardner C. McFarland was promoted to the position of District Manager. He was the first Manager to ever serve the District. In the 1960s the special district acquired 14 additional cities and, as a result, established a branch operational facility in North Hollywood.

The 1983 outbreak of St. Louis encephalitis infected 26 people (17 within the special district) with two fatalities. During this time, Insect growth regulators, growth inhibitors, and biorational products gradually replaced organophosphate insecticides' dominant use. In 1994, the District changed its name from Southeast Mosquito Abatement District to the present moniker of the Greater Los Angeles County Vector Control District. In 1997, a new District headquarters was built in Santa Fe Springs, replacing the South Gate facility.

Due to a rise in nuisance complaints, in 1998, a black fly assessment zone to control black flies along a special 26-mile corridor of the Los Angeles River was established, and a proactive midge program focused on preventing midge nuisance associated with water reclamation, water regeneration, and flood control improvement sources was implemented. The Africanized honey bee removal program began following bee colonization in Los Angeles County.

In 2001, the Asian tiger mosquito, an imported exotic species of mosquito, was discovered in a shipment of lucky bamboo. GLACVCD was the first agency to take responsive action. In 2002, the District discontinued its Africanized honeybee removal service. The control and removal of Africanized honeybees (AHB) continued until July 1, 2002. Currently, the District provides informational materials on AHB. The implementation of the Underground Storm Drain Program was incorporated into operations to avert the spread of West Nile virus. The northern branch office opened in Sylmar in 2001, replacing the North Hollywood Branch facility.

In 2003, West Nile virus (WNV) was detected in the District on October 3, 2003. The District began a collaborative research program with the University of California, Davis to investigate the urban disease ecology of WNV. A year later, in 2004, West Nile virus made its presence known, particularly in Southern California. California's human case rate was 3/100,000 which was low compared to other states. The District expended an additional $500,000 on resources, labor, and community outreach. This unprecedented effort (including the "Wipe Out West Nile Virus" campaign), protected and saved lives. West Nile virus transmission continued throughout the state and the District in 2005. The District also implemented the use of ArcView database and mapping system to assist with mosquito surveillance and control activities. Los Angeles City passed an ordinance allowing for the swift remediation of standing water. By 2006, West Nile virus transmission continued throughout the state; however, the District saw a sharp reduction in the number of positives in the mosquito and avian population. Unfortunately, in 2007, California experienced a resurgence of West Nile virus activity. Within the District, 32 human cases were reported leading to 3 fatalities. These fatalities were the first in the District since 2004. In August, Governor Arnold Schwarzenegger declared a state of emergency for the three counties in Central California hardest hit by the virus. The Governor made approximately $10 million in emergency WNV funds available to mosquito control agencies throughout the State. GLACVCD increased control, surveillance, and public education efforts with grants received from the State.

In June 2006, General Manager Jack Hazelrigg announced his retirement. The Board of Trustees appointed Ken Bayless to be General Manager starting December, 2007.

In 2008, GLACVCD managed the second most active West Nile virus year on record for Southern California. California experienced a 17% increase in confirmed West Nile virus positive human cases from 2007 to 2008. The Green Pool Task Force formed and developed a plan to address the high number of neglected swimming pools in the District resulting from the housing foreclosure crisis.

Following a 6th Circuit Court of Appeals ruling in 2010 that vector control agencies are subject to the Clean Water Act and must obtain an NPDES permit to apply public health pesticides in or near waters of the U.S., the District began working with MVCAC, member districts, and the CA State Water Resources Control Board to develop a state permit and monitoring coalition.

In 2011, the Greater Los Angeles Area experienced an epidemic West Nile virus year, with activity levels almost reaching those recorded for 2004 and 2008. The California Department of Public Health documented 158 West Nile virus human cases with 9 of those cases resulting in fatalities. In September 2011, an infestation of the Asian tiger mosquito was discovered in the San Gabriel Valley.

In 2012, West Nile virus received national attention in the summer of 2012 when health officials in Dallas, Texas declared a state of emergency in response to the unprecedented number of human cases in the state. In Los Angeles, the District experienced the highest level of WNV activity since 2008. In addition, aggressive surveillance, control, and education efforts also continued as part of the eradication campaign against the invasive Asian tiger mosquito in the San Gabriel Valley. Both WNV and ATM activity continued through the end of December.

In 2013, General Manager Ken Bayless announced his resignation. The Board of Trustees appointed Truc Dever to be General Manager starting January 1, 2014.

In 2021, General Manager Truc Dever announced her resignation. The Board of Trustees appointed Susanne Kluh to be General Manager starting March 11, 2022.

== Vectors Controlled ==
=== Mosquitoes ===
Due to a citizen petition aimed at controlling mosquitoes emerging from the Los Angeles River, GLACVCD's first vector to control are mosquitoes. Mosquitoes are primary vectors in transmitting West Nile virus in California. The first reported sign of West Nile virus didn't appear until 2003. Since then, GLACVCD has been controlling mosquitoes as well as monitoring West Nile virus.

In 2001, the Asian tiger mosquito, an imported exotic species of mosquito, was discovered in a shipment of lucky bamboo. GLACVCD was the first agency to take responsive action. In September 2011, an infestation of the Asian tiger mosquito was discovered in the San Gabriel Valley. The San Gabriel Valley MVCD and GLACVCD worked collaboratively to conduct intensive surveillance and control efforts. The infestation zone incorporated approximately 18 square miles in the cities of South El Monte, El Monte, and portions of unincorporated LA County. The two districts continued to identify Asian tiger mosquito activity through the end of December 2011.

=== Black Flies ===
Black flies are small, menacing, biting flies that are a nuisance to people and animals living, working, or playing near running rivers and streams.

The District controls black flies along an 18-mile stretch of the Los Angeles River from the Sepulveda Basin in the San Fernando Valley to the junction of the 5 and 110 freeways, northeast of downtown Los Angeles. The Black Fly Control Program began in 1994 as a result of a severe black fly infestation along the river corridor that affected horse owners, golfers, and even baseball players at Dodger Stadium. The black fly population that breeds in the river is composed primarily of Simulium vittatum.

=== Midges ===
Midges are non-biting flies that resemble mosquitoes in size and general appearance. They are approximately a half-inch in length and light green to brown in color.

The District has been involved in collaborative research programs concerning the biology, ecology, and control of midges since the early 1960s. Collaborative research concluded that physical control, the ability to manage the movement of water to and from midge habitats, is the most effective method for preventing midge occurrence. This method properly disrupts the midge life cycle, preventing adult emergence. Larvicide use becomes unnecessary or minimal and service requests remain infrequent.

In 1998, after years of responding to midge complaints, the District began a proactive midge control program aimed at preventing adult midge emergence. The basis of the program is to maximize physical control and minimize the use of larvicides. In order to achieve this, the District has established a relationship with the Los Angeles County Department of Public Works, which is the agency that controls the water sources responsible for creating midge habitat.

== Services ==
Community Outreach

Scientific-Technical

Operations
