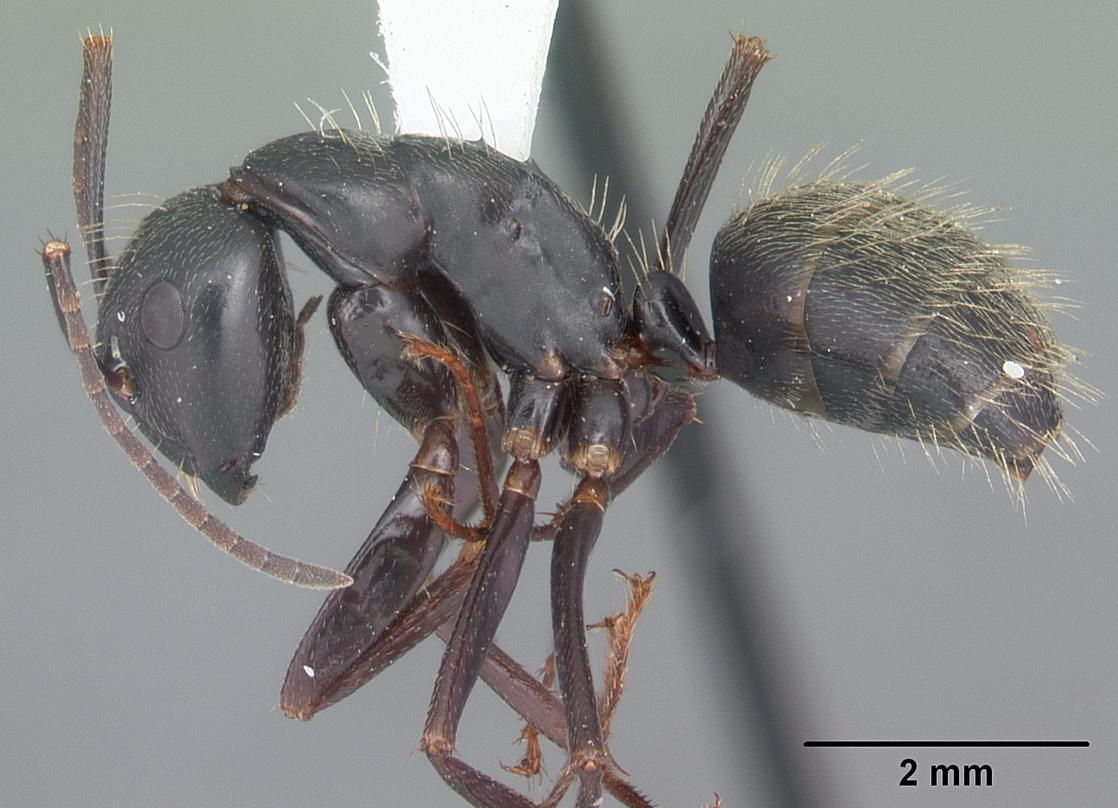
- Camponotus pennsylvanicus worker

Scientific classification
- Kingdom: Animalia
- Phylum: Arthropoda
- Clade: Pancrustacea
- Class: Insecta
- Order: Hymenoptera
- Family: Formicidae
- Subfamily: Formicinae
- Genus: Camponotus
- Subgenus: Camponotus
- Species: C. pennsylvanicus

Binomial name
- Camponotus pennsylvanicus (De Geer, 1773)

= Black carpenter ant =

Species of American ant (Camponotus pennsylvanicus)

The black carpenter ant (Camponotus pennsylvanicus) is one of the largest and most common species of carpenter ant native to the central and eastern United States as well as eastern Canada.

== Description ==
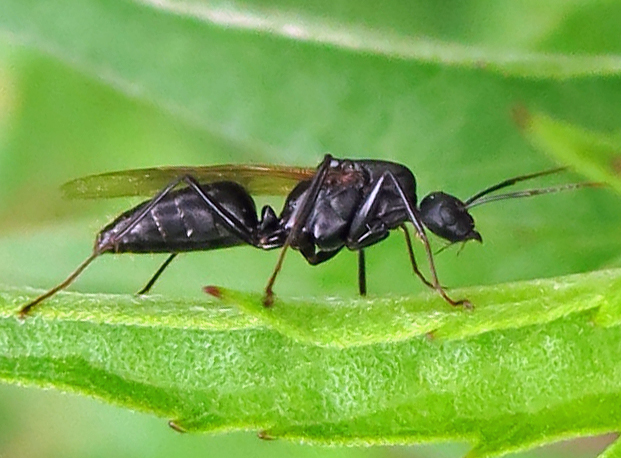
Black carpenter ant male

C. pennsylvanicus can be distinguished from other carpenter ant species by the dull black color of the head and body, and by whitish or yellowish hairs on the abdomen. All castes of this species (including the major and minor workers, queens and males) are black or blackish. Black carpenter ants are polymorphic, i.e., workers can be different sizes, in some instances substantially. The queens can reach a length of 19–21 mm and the largest workers (super majors) can achieve similar sizes of around 14–17 mm . They, along with several other Camponotus species, are among the largest species of ant in North America. As with all ants, the antennae are geniculate (elbowed). Workers usually have 12 antenna segments. Alates typically have yellowish wings.

== Behavior ==
Black carpenter ants are known to forage up to 100 yd (91 m) in search of food, establishing chemical (pheromone) trails as they forage. They locate food through their sense of smell. Nests can contain thousands of individuals, and such large nests may be noticed by the audible cracking sound the workers produce. The black carpenter ant cannot sting, but the larger workers can administer a sharp bite, which can become further irritated by the spraying of formic acid onto the wound. Workers tend aphids, with the smaller workers collecting honeydew and transferring it to larger workers that carry it back to the nest. In addition, foragers feed on dead insects and plant juices. Foraging typically occurs at night.

== Range ==
Black carpenter ants occur almost everywhere east of the Rocky Mountains in woodlands, forest edges, and suburban communities.

== Control measures ==
In their natural environment, carpenter ants nest in dead trees and other dead wood. This enhances decay, which has ecological benefits. However, the ant achieves pest status when a colony invades the wood of a house or other structure, damaging its structural integrity.

Since they favor moist wood as a habitat, any condition that promotes moisture should be eliminated to prevent infestation. The easiest of these is keeping gutters clear so water does not run down the side of the structure or gain entry. Moist wood is much easier to chew. The ants do not eat the wood, but remove it to create galleries for their activities. The galleries run parallel to the grain, as they are created in the softer, non-aligning portions of the timber. The galleries have a sandpaper-like feel, due to fecal remnants, but the mud tubes produced by termites will not be present.
