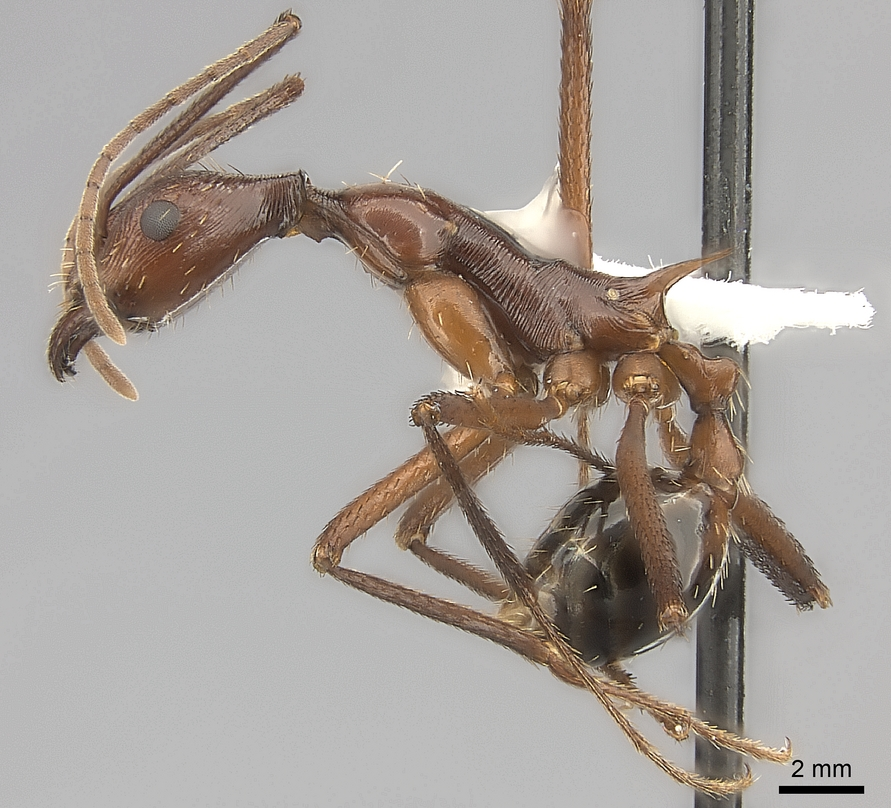
- N. ensifer worker specimen

Scientific classification
- Kingdom: Animalia
- Phylum: Arthropoda
- Clade: Pancrustacea
- Class: Insecta
- Order: Hymenoptera
- Family: Formicidae
- Subfamily: Myrmicinae
- Genus: Novomessor
- Species: N. ensifer

Binomial name
- Novomessor ensifer (Forel, 1899)

Synonyms
- Novomessor manni Wheeler & Creighton, 1934

= Novomessor ensifer =

Species of ant

Novomessor ensifer is a species of ant endemic to Mexico. A member of the genus Novomessor in the subfamily Myrmicinae, it was first described by Swiss entomologist Auguste Forel in 1899. N. ensifer was originally a part of the genus Aphaenogaster until a recent phylogenetic study concluded that Novomessor was genetically distinct and should be separated. The ant is a medium-sized species, measuring 5.5 to 10 millimetres (0.2 to 0.4 in). The ant is ferruginous-colored in some certain parts of the body, and small workers (nanitics) in incipient colonies are noticeably different in color and body structure.

N. ensifer is active throughout the day, where they forage on the ground and sometimes on low herbs. Colonies are found under stones and other objects in tropical dry forests and pine-oak forests. These ants are solitary foragers and predominantly feed on insects such as wasps and moths. The only known predator of N. ensifer is the giant horned lizard (Phrynosoma asio). While nothing is known about its reproduction, nuptial flight may take place during spring or summer, where queens establish their nests under stones and other objects.

== Taxonomy ==
Novomessor ensifer was originally described as Aphaenogaster ensifera in 1899 by Swiss entomologist Auguste Forel, who provided the first description of N. ensifer in his third volume of Biologia Centrali-Americana. Among the genus Aphaenogaster, Italian entomologist Carlo Emery placed N. ensifer in the subgenus Deromyrma in 1915, although this is now a synonym. In 1934, the taxon Novomessor manni was described as a new species of Novomessor based on workers collected by William M. Mann at Colima, Mexico. However, a study showed that N. manni was a synonym of N. ensifer. Brown comments that N. manni was described as a new species because of the supposed distinct features between two type specimens of N. ensifer, but Brown noticed no morphological differences. The exact type locality for N. manni is unknown, but entomologist Paul Kannowski speculates that the ant is restricted to arid scrub forests around the Pacific Slope in Mexico. This speculation is consistent with the preferred habitat of N. ensifer.

Novomessor was synonymized in 1974, although evidence to retain it as a valid genus emerged when scientists discovered an exocrine gastral glandular system in two Novomessor species and none in Aphaenogaster. However, N. ensifer does not have this glandular system. English myrmecologist Barry Bolton argues that basing the genus on such feature cannot justify the separation of Novomessor and Aphaenogaster. In 2015, a phylogenetic study concluded that Novomessor was genetically distinct from Aphaenogaster, and the genus was revived from synonymy to include N. ensifer, N. albisetosus and N. cockerelli as members of it.

== Description ==
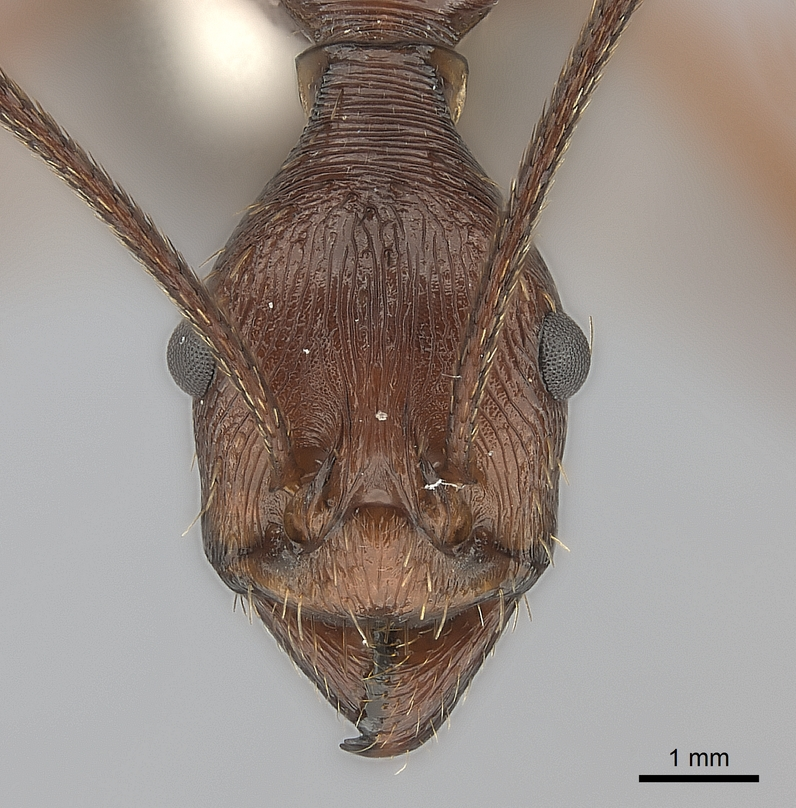
Head detail of N. ensifer

N. ensifer is a medium-sized species, measuring 5.5 to 10 millimetres (0.2 to 0.4 in). Excluding the mandibles, the head is 1.93–2.53 millimetres (0.076–0.100 in) long and 1.25–1.69 millimetres (0.049–0.067 in) wide. The scapes of the antennae surpass the occipital margin, and the second segment of the funiculus is longer than the first. The third and fourth segments are the same length as each other, although they are longer than the second. Between the fifth and second last segments, they are much shorter except for the last one. The head is twice as long than broad, and it is widest behind the eyes. The larvae measure 8 millimetres (0.3 in) in length and appear similar to that of N. albisetosus. The larvae can be distinguished by the abundance of hair with long stouts found on the body. The apical teeth of the mandibles are long and straight, whereas the medial teeth are much smaller.

The posterior to the eyes are convex, where it converges towards the occiput (the back of the head) and forms a collar seen in several Aphaenogaster species. The ants have large, triangular mandibles with three apical teeth and a flat clypeus. The eyes are large with 400 facets, but workers from small incipient colonies only have 200 facets. Workers from incipient also differ from workers living in mature colonies, notably in size, body shape and coloration. The average length is 5.56–6.5 millimetres (0.219–0.256 in); the head is 1.52–1.69 millimetres (0.060–0.067 in) long and 0.98–1.12 millimetres (0.039–0.044 in) wide. The epinotal spines (spines found on the first abdominal segment that protect the pedicel) are much shorter. Hair is also less noticeable on the workers.

The ant has pubescence (soft short hair) abundant throughout some certain parts of the body, including the funiculi and tarsi. It is more sparse on the coxae, genae (an area on both sides of the head below the eyes), gaster and gula (the reduced sternite of the first segment of the thorax). Hairs on the scapes point downwards. Erect and suberect hair are seen all over the body in sparse numbers, although this varies. These hairs are not as abundant in comparison to other Novomessor species. The head and thorax are both ferruginous-colored, and the epinotal spines, legs and node are yellowish red. The antennal scapes are reddish brown and the abdomen is piceous brown. The hair exhibits a gold-like color. The suture is absent from the thorax, and the mesonotum is wider than the epinotum. The front portion of the mesonotum is narrow whereas the back is rectangular. The node is evenly round and oval shaped, the postpetiole is narrow at the front and the dorsum is feebly convex. The gaster is large and oval shaped.

== Distribution and habitat ==
N. ensifer is endemic to Mexico and can be found in tropical dry forests at altitudes of between 115 and 1,700 ft (35 and 518 m) above sea level. In some cases, colonies have been found 5,000 ft (1,500 m) below the Pacific Slope. The ant is found throughout several Mexican states within the east, including Guerrero and Michoacán from the south, and Colima and Jalisco from the north. Nests are commonly found in basins and mountains along the Pacific Slope in pine-oak forests. Scrub-thorn forests are also abundant, consisting of trees and shrubs that are 15 and 25 ft (4.6 and 7.6 m) tall, but other areas may contain low herbs and grasses. Plants and trees such as thorn trees (Acacia), poinciana plants (Caesalpinia pulcherrima) and Casearia corymbosa have been identified in these habitats. Other identified plants and trees include Indian mallows (Abutilon), spurred anodas (Anoda cristata), Cathestecum erectum, dayflowers (Commelina), cigar plants (Cuphea), hairy crabgrass (Digitaria sanguinalis), crane grass (Ixophorus unisetus), Mimosa, Mexican panicgrass (Panicum hirticaule), Senna uniflora and Setaria liebmannii. These habitats usually have a wet season in summer and autumn and a dry season in spring.

N. ensifer is a xerophilous species that can thrive in dry climates. In Colima, colonies are frequent among the basins, but rarely are they found in the mountainous regions. N. ensifer ants prefer to nest in the sand and under large stones, as certain areas in Manzanillo had no stones buried in the soil and no colonies were found alongside hills with plain soil. Most colonies are found under stones with no noticeable craters surrounding the nest entrance, although one colony was found under an Acacia plant. These nest holes are usually 1 in (2.5 cm) in diameter. A single path connects the entrance to the main nest site, followed by a passage that descends straight into the dirt several inches deep. This passage widens under a stone which forms a gallery for the larvae and pupae. Wherever stones are formed, passageways may descend further into the ground and form more chambers. Although it is unknown how deep these passages go, excavated nests are as deep as 15 in (38 cm).

== Behavior and ecology ==
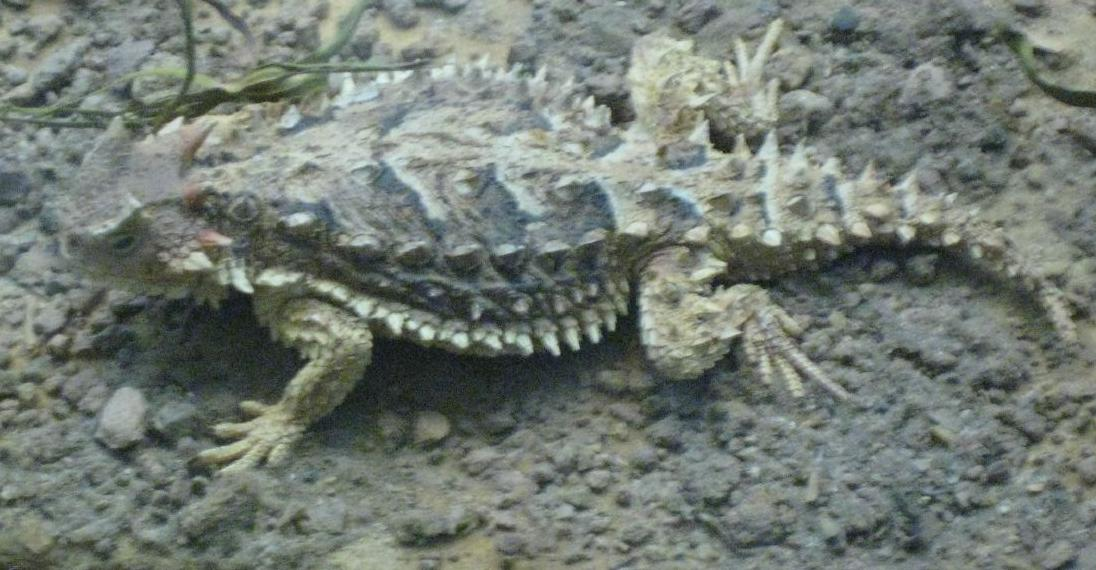
The giant horned lizard is a known predator of N. ensifer

Unlike other Novomessor species, workers forage early in the morning and late afternoon, whereas N. cockerelli and N. albisetosus forage during the afternoon and evening. However, it is unknown whether or not these ants are active during the night. Foragers first emerge from their nests at 9 A.M. and return by 5 P.M. They are rarely seen during the middle of the day when temperatures reach 95–100 °F (35–38 °C), although the ground temperature is considerably higher. Workers are commonly seen foraging between 9 and 11 A.M. and 3 to 5 P.M. Most workers forage on the ground, but sometimes they can be seen walking on low herbage without feeding on the plants or collecting any seeds. Excavated nests showed no evidence that these ants collect seeds, and no workers were seen collecting them or carrying them back to the nest. N. ensifer ants are solitary foragers that work 25 ft (7.6 m) away from their home nest. N. ensifer predominantly feeds on insects they prey on, consuming dead insects such as ichneumon wasps, bembicine wasps and small moths. When a worker discovers a dead insect, it will start to pull and carry it back to the nest immediately, and other nestmates will join once they detect it. Workers do not cooperate with each other and pull the insect from all directions, accidentally tearing it apart. However, the workers will eventually have a piece of the insect left and return it to the nest. The only known predator of N. ensifer is the giant horned lizard (Phrynosoma asio). Mites and Springtail arthropods are known to dwell inside nests, but their function or purpose within a colony is unknown.

Nothing is known about its reproduction or nuptial flight. Collectors note that no alates or pupae resembling alate forms were found in excavated colonies between August and February, and the larvae collected were not large enough to be reproductive ants. However, it is possible that nuptial flight takes place in spring or summer, and like N. albisetosus and N.cockerelli, alates most likely start to occur by June. After nuptial flight, queens search for a suitable colony by building a chamber under objects such as stones and exposed roots of woody plants. This theory stated by entomologist Paul Kannowski is supported by the fact that these ants depend on stones buried in the soil for nest construction. The larvae and pupae are unsorted in the upper chambers of the nest that are joined by hooked hairs on the side of the larvae. This arrangement most likely helps workers move the brood efficiently and keep them together in a group. Incipient colonies may only have 30 workers and brood in all life stages. Unlike the larvae and pupae, the eggs and queen are not found in the uppermost galleries, but rather they are found in the deepest chambers of the nest. In large nests, small workers resembling the first generation of brood are either rare or absent.
