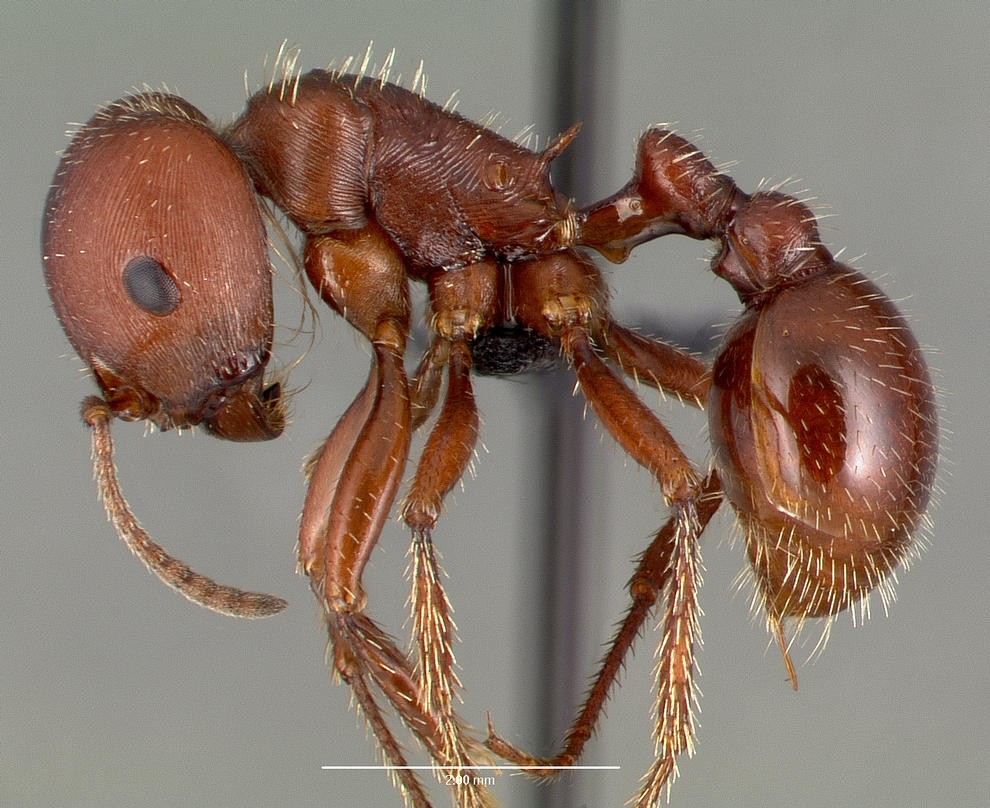
- P. barbatus worker from Texas, United States

Scientific classification
- Kingdom: Animalia
- Phylum: Arthropoda
- Class: Insecta
- Order: Hymenoptera
- Family: Formicidae
- Subfamily: Myrmicinae
- Genus: Pogonomyrmex
- Species: P. barbatus

Binomial name
- Pogonomyrmex barbatus Smith, 1858

= Red harvester ant =

Pogonomyrmex barbatus

Species of ant

Pogonomyrmex barbatus is a species of harvester ant from the genus Pogonomyrmex. Its common names include red ant and red harvester ant. These large (5 to 7 mm) ants prefer arid chaparral habitats and are native to the Southwestern United States. Nests are made underground (up to 2.5 m deep) in exposed areas. Their diets consist primarily of seeds, and they consequently participate in myrmecochory, an ant-plant interaction through which the ants gain nutrients and the plants benefit through seed dispersal. Red harvester ants are often mistaken for fire ants, but are not closely related to any fire ant species, native or introduced.

== Colonization ==
Red harvester ant nests are characterized by a lack of plant growth and small pebbles surrounding the entrance to the tunnel, which usually descends at a pronounced angle. Hulls of seeds may be found scattered around the nest. In grassland areas, such as ranches, the lack of plant life makes red harvester ant colonies very easy to spot, and where they are very plentiful, they may make serious inroads into the grazing available to livestock. The mounds are typically flat and broad, up to 100 mm (3.9 in) high, and 300 to 1,200 mm (12 to 47 in) in diameter. Even larger denuded areas have been reported, on the order of 10 m^{2} (110 sq ft). Three to eight trails typically lead away from the mound, like "arms". These trails are used by ants to collect and bring food back to the mound. "Scout" ants are the first ones out of the mound every morning. They seek food, and mark their path as they return to the mound to alert the worker ants. The worker ants follow the scent trail and collect the food. Other worker ants clean, extend, and generally tend to the mound, the queen, and the brood. All the ants in the colonies are females apart from the winged males produced in the breeding season.

=== Initial colony formation ===
The reproductive unit of ant populations is the colony. A single virgin queen first mates with several males at a reproductive aggregation site formed by male harvester ants. She then flies to a new site to produce an offspring colony.

== Diet ==
The main food source for red harvester ants usually consists of seeds, which they hoard in great numbers. The food is first ground to a bread-like consistency using the ants' large mandibles, and is then stored in a granary, assuring the colony access to food year-round. Seed collection on behalf of the red harvester ants benefits their ecosystem through the process of myrmecochory, in which ants aid in the dispersal of seeds while foraging for food. Both plants and ants benefit from this relationship; the plants increase their dispersal range and density, while the ants benefit from acquiring nutrients and ensuring a more secure food supply in future harvests. This is typically understood as a mutualistic interaction. Dead insects are also collected during foraging.

=== Foraging ===
Much research has been done on the foraging behavior of the red harvester ant. Three types of workers are most involved in the foraging process - nest patrollers, trail patrollers, and foragers. On a given day, nest patrollers emerge first from the nest to assess the safety and profitability of foraging. The colony gets the majority of its water from the metabolism of the fats in seeds. If food is scarce, or if it is a particularly hot day, the energy and water benefits of foraging may be outweighed by its energy and water costs. In this case, the colony may be forced to rely on its extensive food stores. Seeds may be stored in the nest for months or even several years.

The colony is able to communicate through momentary antennal contact involving the transfer of cuticular hydrocarbons. Other visual, temporal, and olfactory cues may also be involved. Based on the nest patrollers’ reports, trail patrollers may leave the nest to determine the best possible foraging direction. This decision is based upon various economic factors such as food availability and neighboring nests’ foraging behavior. As both types of patrollers return, foragers assess their rates of return to decide whether to leave the nest to find food. In an experiment involving patroller mimics, a return rate of one patroller every 10 seconds stimulated the highest level of foraging activity. This return rate indicates high availability of food and good foraging conditions, therefore a favorable cost-benefit ratio for the foragers exists. If the patroller return rate is too high, it may be a warning of danger, such as the sighting of a predatory lizard. A lower return rate could indicate lack of available food, or heavy competition.

Ant foraging is guided by chemical signals that lead the ants up to 50–60 m from the nest at times. Once an ant has decided to forage, it will almost always continue until it has found food to take back to the nest; 90% of returning foragers are “successful”. Therefore, forager return rate is a good indicator of food availability. Logically, overall foraging activity is influenced by the rate of returning foragers. When food is plentiful, foragers quickly find it and immediately return to the nest. Foragers still in the nest interpret this to mean food searches will be profitable - low energy input with a high chance of a seed reward. Foraging activity consequently is increased. Likewise, a decline in food availability, indicated by a decrease in forager return rate, causes the colony to decrease its foraging activity.

The ability for a colony to quickly regulate its foraging behavior is quite important, since their food source is variable and scattered. This regulatory ability is variable in itself, influenced by food availability, current need to eat, and colony health. Colonies are more likely to adapt to varying forager return rates when the rate of foraging is high, which may be because variances are simply harder to detect during low rates. Overall, the red harvester ant demonstrates a remarkable ability in social cognition, cost-benefit analysis, and behavioral economics.

=== Collective regulation ===
Harvester ant populations operate without a centralized control system by means of a decentralized chemical communication system, through the process of chemical signalling. Foraging is regulated using positive and negative feedback loops. Ants returning to the colony stimulates outgoing foraging. When ants return to the colony at a higher rate with seeds, this in turn causes the outgoing rate of foragers to increase. As fewer ants bearing seeds return to the colony, the rate of outgoing foragers decreases. The result is foraging regulation relative to the abundance of available food at any given time. The interactions between returning and outgoing foragers operates on a timescale of seconds. It typically only took three to eight seconds for an outgoing forager to leave the nest as a result of an increase in successful returning foragers.

Relative abundance of food available is gauged by the average time spent foraging per seed, rather than the distance traveled to find each seed. Foragers take less time when food is more abundant. Faster foraging signals faster rates of outgoing foragers, maximizing the harvest of food relative to the abundance in the area. Seeds are used as a source of water for ants, and are often kept in the nest for a few months to several years.

==== Interference competition in foraging ====
Interspecific competition exists between harvester ant populations, presenting challenges to successful foraging. One example of this is the competition for access to seed resources between the Novomessor cockerelli and Pogonomyrmex barbatus species of harvester ants. Novomessor cockerelli ants engage in interference competition against Pogonomyrmex barbatus colonies by "plugging" entrances to the nest with sand and small rocks. This delays activity of P. barbatus for one to three hours, shifting the onset of foraging until later in the day when the temperature is substantially higher. This reduces productivity in two ways; firstly, the ants are delayed and consequently have less time to forage; secondly, high soil temperatures prematurely drive harvest ants back into their nests, shortening the range of possible foraging. Research indicated that the affected P. barbatus populations did not take efforts to compensate for the interference in their activities, such as by inducing higher rates of foraging. As such, nest plugging by rival species impedes the overall productivity of worker ants in the species Pogonomyrmex barbatus.

== Division of labor ==
=== Caste system ===
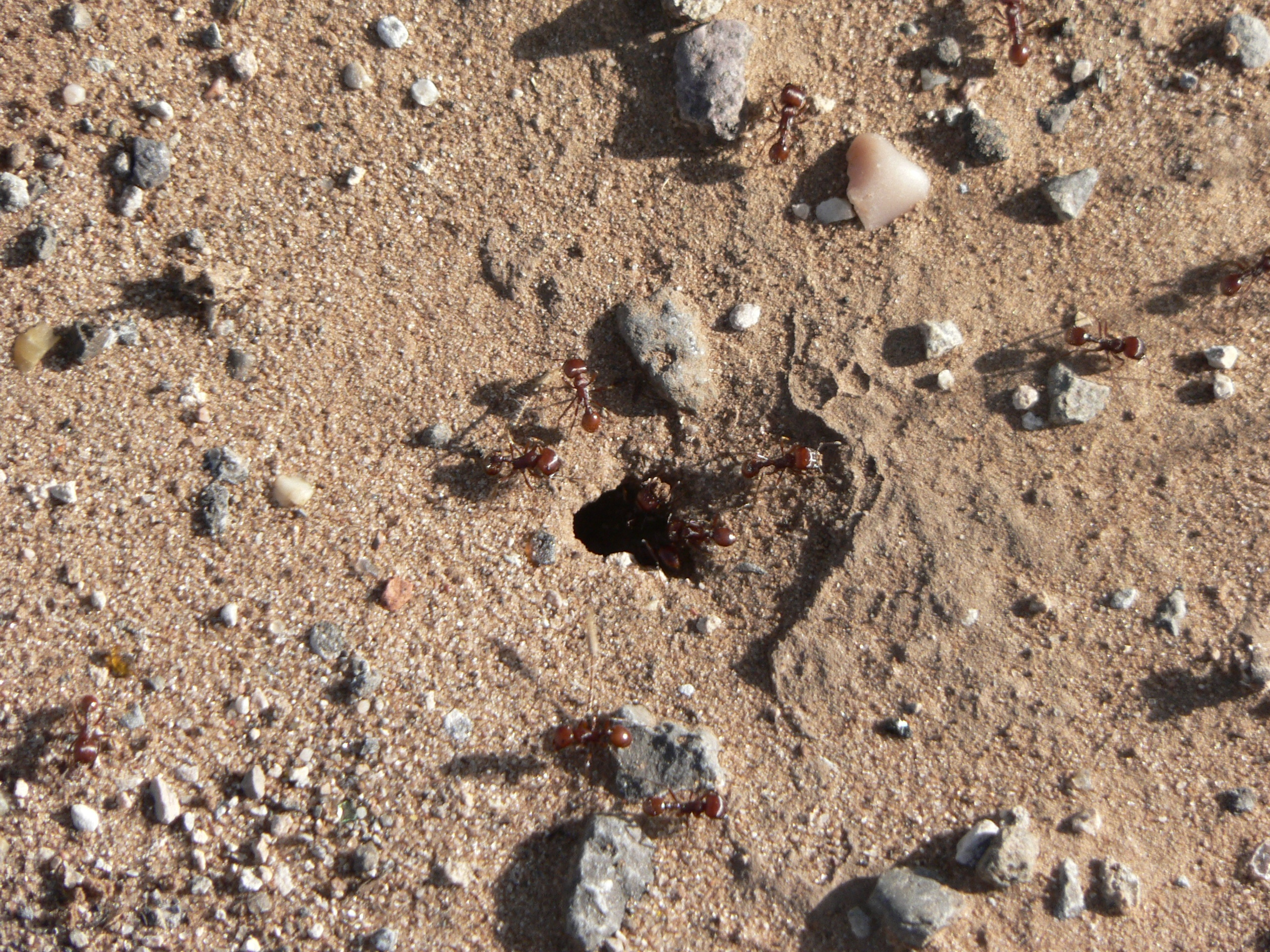
Red harvester ant nest entry

Red harvester ants are eusocial insects, characterized by a high level of cooperation and an organized division of labor. The worker caste is sterile. As with most ant species, reproduction is performed by a mating caste that consists of winged alates (reproductives) that reside in the nest until weather permits them to fly away and mate. After copulation, the male usually dies, while the now-fertilized queen returns to the ground to search for a suitable nesting site. Once she has chosen a site, she sheds her wings and begins to reproduce, creating a new colony. She produces "worker ants" for 1–20 years until her death. Some queens have been known to live up to 30 years in the wild.

In P. barbatus, reproductive and nonreproductive tasks are divided into a caste system, as discussed above. Some individuals are specialized for reproductive function, while other ants are responsible for nonreproductive roles such as defense, caring for the brood, and foraging for food. The system of division of labor naturally arises in conjunction with the formation of the group, rather than as a secondary adaptation; otherwise solitary queen harvest ants placed in forced association had division of labor arise in groups that lack an evolutionary history of such social arrangements.

=== Nonreproductive caste ===
Within nonreproductive P. barbatus worker ants, five major tasks are performed: foraging, maintenance of the nest, defense, midden work, and convening. Roles are not constant and chemical interactions determine when certain ants engage in certain activities. As such, these tasks are relatively fluid and cannot be understood as separate processes. The transition in behavior on behalf of one group triggers behavioral transitions in other groups of worker ants.

=== Reproductive caste ===
The reproductive P. barbatus caste is responsible for the formation of new colonies. A single queen ant establishes every colony. Large numbers of winged male ants and virgin queen ants fly to mating aggregation sites following midsummer monsoon rains. To found a successful colony, P. barbatus queens must mate with males from two separate lineages. One lineage results in ants that become the workers of the colony. These are the ants responsible for the nonreproductive tasks of the colony. The other lineage produces reproductive female ants. After mating with the male ants at the aggregation site, the queen flies away to establish a new colony. Upon arriving at her new nest site, the queen loses her wings and builds a nest in the soil. The entrance into the nest is then sealed off to lay her eggs in safety. With this, the colony is born. Over the course of the following six to eight weeks, the primary brood of nonreproductive worker ants emerges and begins to forage and build the colony.

== Reproduction ==
=== Mating behavior ===
Mating is perennial and species-specific between subspecies of the red harvester ant. Males distinguish reproductive females of their species from females of other species using pheromones. This occurs as a result of sexually stimulating pheromones secreted from the poison glands of reproductive P. barbatus females. These pheromones are perfectly detected by males of the species upon physical contact, resulting in the stimulation of sexual behavior.

Mating occurs at reproductive aggregation sites. Secretions from the mandibular glands of males initially mark these sites. The secretions attract females, as well as additional males, resulting in strong male competition for mates. The system of mating within P. barbatus is comparable to lek behavior performed by many vertebrate species. The male ants congregate and collectively give off a pheromone that attracts reproductive females. The more males present to give off the pheromone, the stronger the attraction for the females. Although this practice strongly favors certain males and leaves many others without mates, the congregation of males attracts more females on the whole as opposed to pheromone release on behalf of a solitary male. Consequently, it is more desirable for the less attractive males to remain in the lek than to attempt to attract females on their own.

=== Sexual selection ===
Within reproductive aggregations of P. barbatus ants, strong male competition exists. Males engage in communal mating displays to attract females. Male ants attempt to mate with any female they encounter, but females resist copulation from the males. Consequently, the communal mating displays heavily favor reproduction with larger or more persistent males which are able to overpower the females and successfully copulate. The male ants copulate for as long as possible, likely to restrict access to the female from other males to ensure their sperm survives to reproduce.

=== Predation ===
Red harvester ants are a favorite food for desert horned lizards. Harvester ants defend their colonies vigorously against real or perceived attacks, whether by large or small animals. They may bite ferociously and their stings are venomous and painful. The effect spreads through the lymphatic system, sometimes causing dangerous reactions, especially in animals sensitive or allergic to their venom.

Over the years, their numbers have been declining, and this has often been attributed to competition for food with the invasive red imported fire ant and the Argentine ant. Their decline has affected many native species, especially those for which the red harvester ant is a chief source of food, such as the Texas horned lizard.
