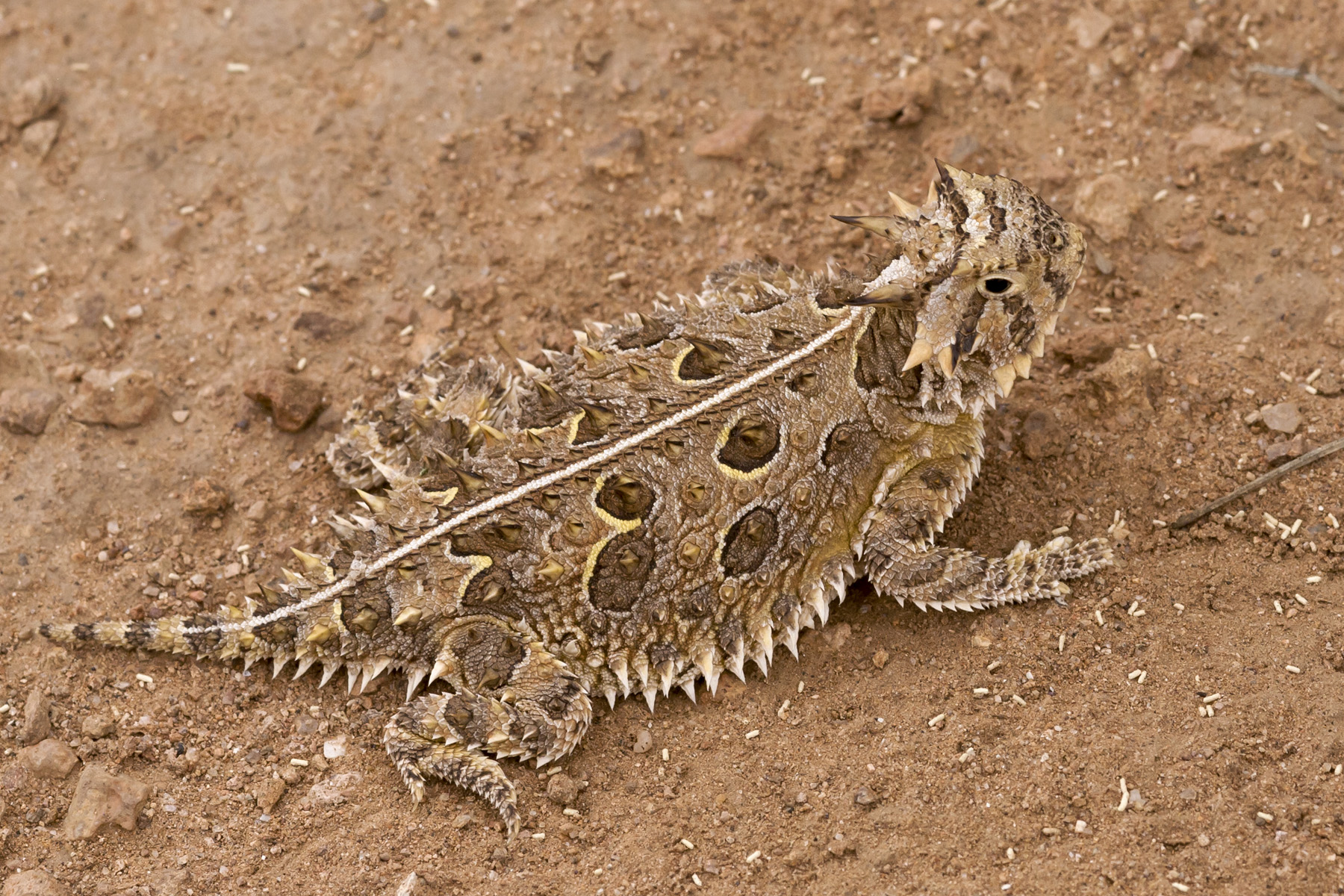
- In New Mexico

Conservation status
- Least Concern (IUCN 3.1)

Scientific classification
- Kingdom: Animalia
- Phylum: Chordata
- Class: Reptilia
- Order: Squamata
- Suborder: Iguania
- Family: Phrynosomatidae
- Genus: Phrynosoma
- Species: P. cornutum

Binomial name
- Phrynosoma cornutum (Harlan, 1825)
- Native distribution

Synonyms
- List: Phrynosoma planiceps Hallowell, 1852 [61]; Phrynosoma harlanii Wiegmann, 1834 [123]; Phrynosoma bufonium Wiegmann, 1828 [43]; Agama cornuta Harlan, 1825 [91]

= Texas horned lizard =

Species of lizard

The Texas horned lizard (Phrynosoma cornutum) is one of about 21 North American species of spikey-bodied reptiles called horned lizards, all belonging the genus Phrynosoma. It occurs in south-central regions of the US and northeastern Mexico, as well as several isolated introduced records and populations from Southern United States. Though some populations are stable, severe population declines have occurred in many areas of Texas and Oklahoma. The Texas spiny lizard (Sceloporus olivaceus) may be confused for a Texas horned lizard due to its appearance and overlapping habitat. Texas horned lizard populations show strong genetic structuring across their range, with limited gene flow between regions. Because the Texas horned lizard is listed as a threatened species in the state, it is illegal to pick up, touch, or possess them in Texas.

== Etymology ==
The horned lizard is popularly called a "horned toad", "horny toad", or "horned frog", but it is neither a toad nor a frog. The popular names come from the lizard's rounded body and blunt snout, which give it a decidedly batrachian appearance. Phrynosoma literally means "toad-bodied" and cornutum means "horned". The lizard's horns are extensions of its cranium and contain true bone.

== Distribution ==
The Texas horned lizard, like all members of the genus Phrynosoma, is endemic to North America where it occurs in south-central regions of the US and northeastern Mexico. Its natural distribution includes southeast Colorado, central and southern areas of Kansas, central and western areas of Oklahoma and Texas, southeast New Mexico, and extreme southeast Arizona. In Mexico it occurs in extreme eastern Sonora, most of Chihuahua, northeast Durango, northern Zacatecas and San Luis Potosí, and throughout most of Coahuila, Nuevo León, and Tamaulipas. It is known from barrier islands on the Gulf Coast of Texas and Tamaulipas at sea level, up to about 1,830 meters elevation. It is absent for higher elevations within its range, where other species of the genus may occur (e.g. Sierra Madre Oriental). Ecological associations include the southern Great Plains, Edwards Plateau, Tamaulipan mezquital, Chihuahua Desert, Llanos el Salado, and many peripheral and marginal areas of these ecoregions. The eastern distributional limit of the Texas horned lizard in the piney woods region of east Texas and western Louisiana, and the Ozark Mountain forests of western Arkansas, and Missouri likely represent introductions however, some have argued these records reflect natural relic populations.

=== Introduced range ===
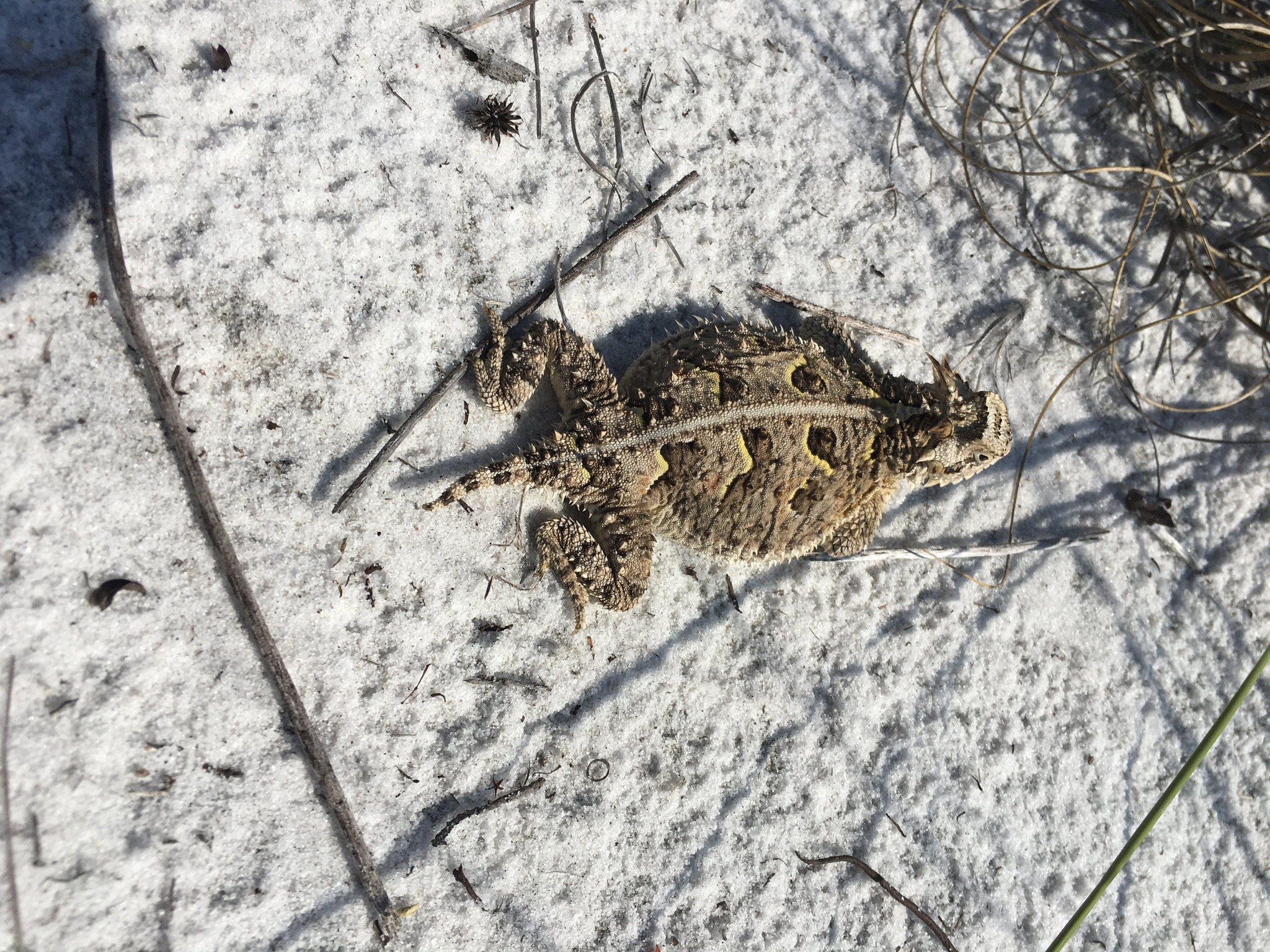
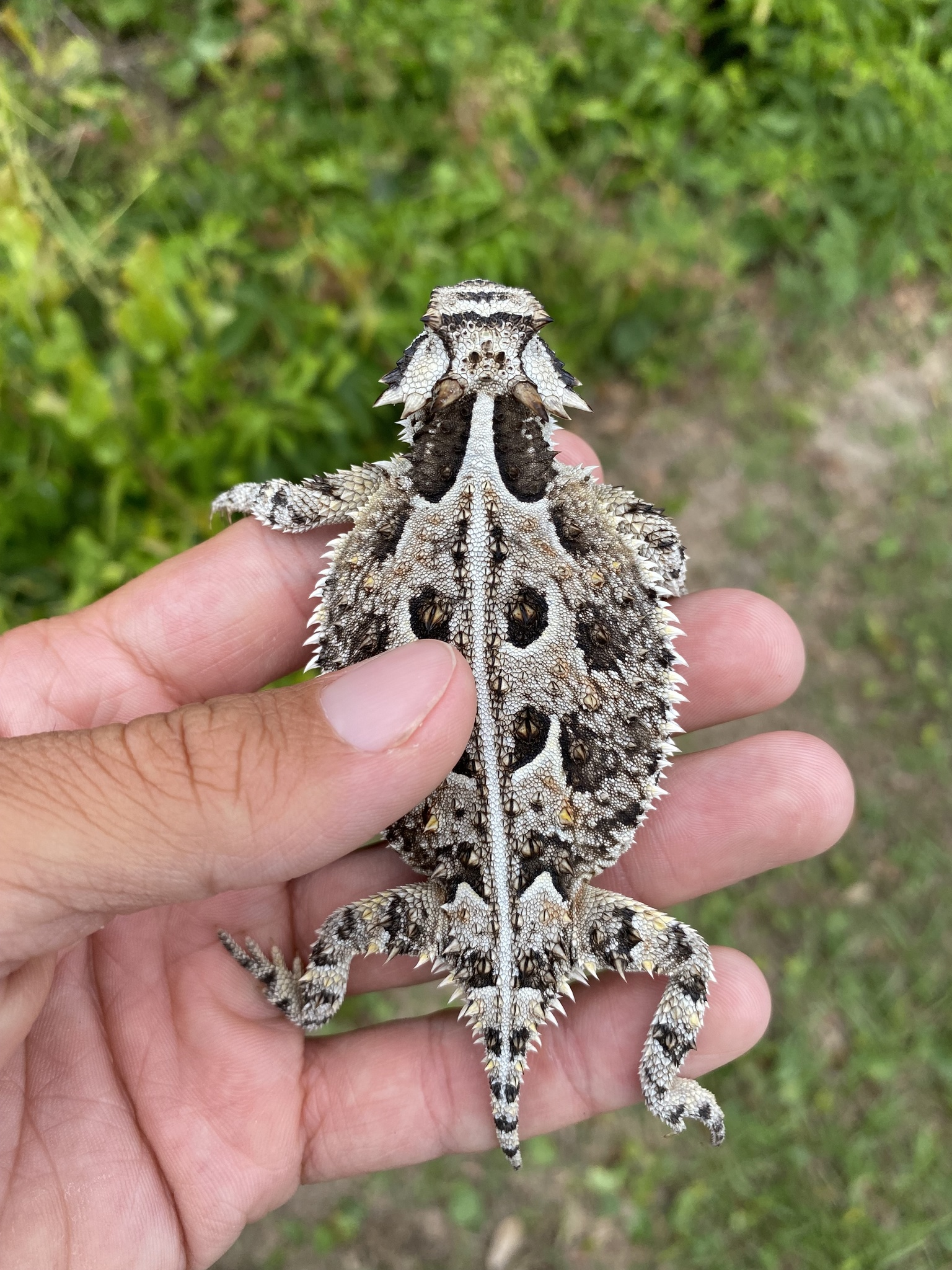
Introduced species in: Escambia County, Florida (left) and Charleston County, South Carolina (right)

Many records of introductions from areas beyond its natural range have been reported as a result of released and escaped individuals from the pet trade in the early and mid-twentieth century, including: Alabama, Arizona, Colorado, the District of Columbia, Illinois, Indiana, Kentucky, Michigan, Mississippi, Nebraska, North Carolina, Tennessee, Virginia, and Wyoming, although these do not represent established, breeding populations. However, a few stable populations, some known for over 50 years, occur in Florida, Georgia, and South Carolina, but these do not seem to be dispersing or spreading.

== Description ==
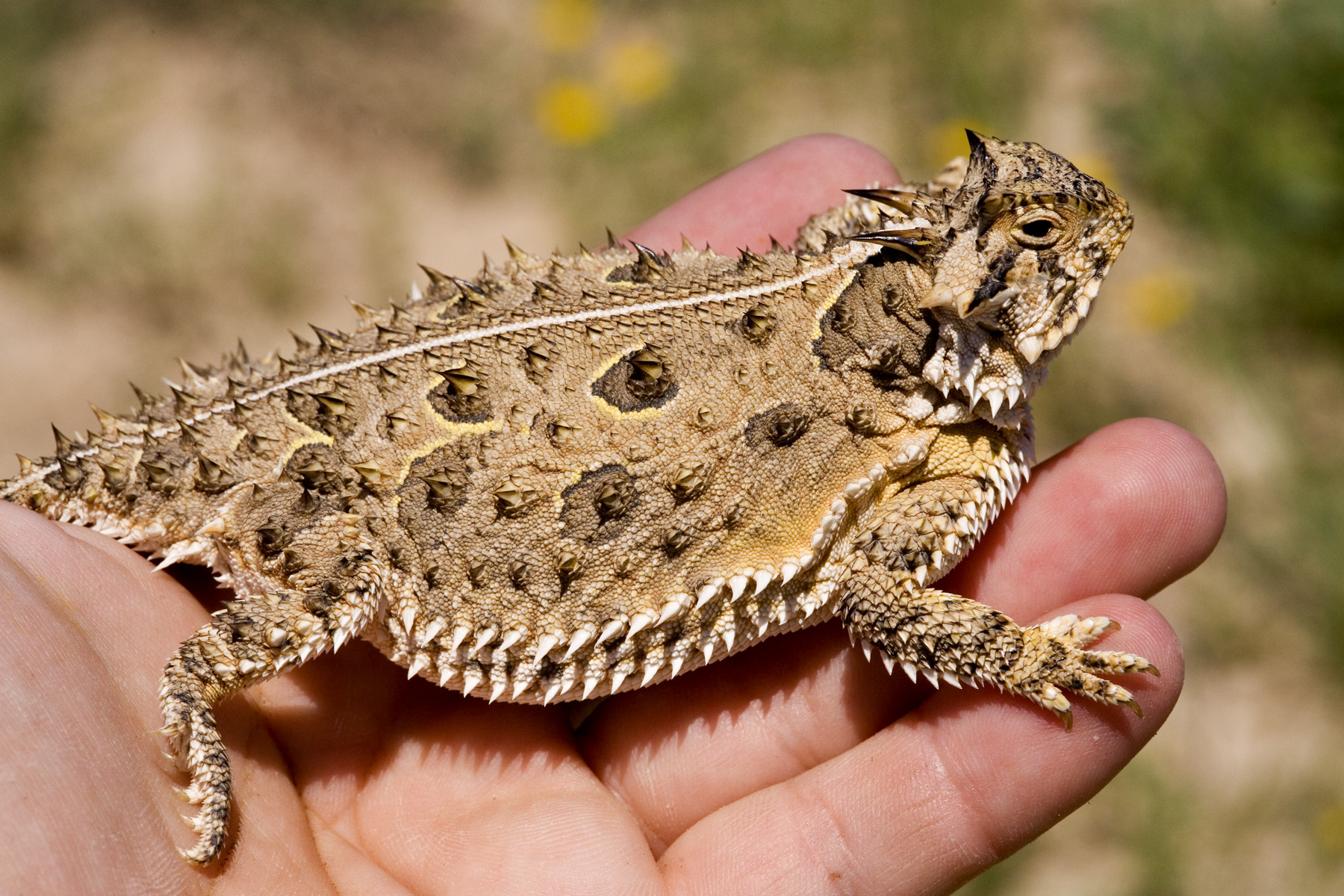
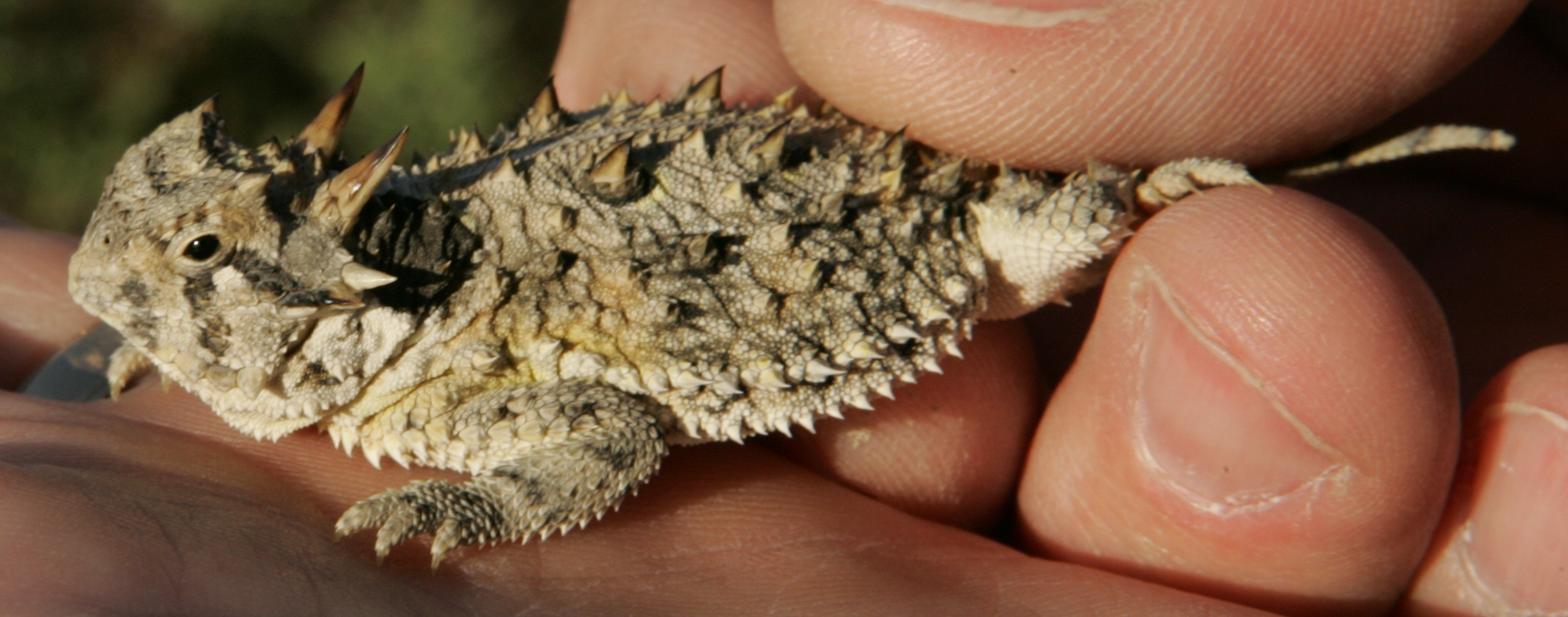
Adult (top) and juvenile (bottom)

The Texas horned lizard is the largest-bodied and most widely distributed of the roughly 21 species of horned lizards in the western United States and Mexico. The Texas horned lizard exhibits sexual dimorphism, with the females being larger with a snout-vent length of around 5 in (13 cm), whereas the males reach around 3.7 in (9.4 cm). "Phrynosoma cornutum" has characteristic horns spanning across its body with the two largest crowning its head, two more on its brows and jawline respectively, as well as lines of spikes spanning the lateral parts of torso and dorsal ridges of the back. Coloration varies depending on the environment in order to blend in with the color of the ground, ranging from a yellow or reddish-brown for deserts to a tannish brown for prairies. Their colors may become more vibrant during mating season. They also have dark lines that span from the eyes to the tip of the horns and a characteristic solid white line with a few black circular splotches on either side.

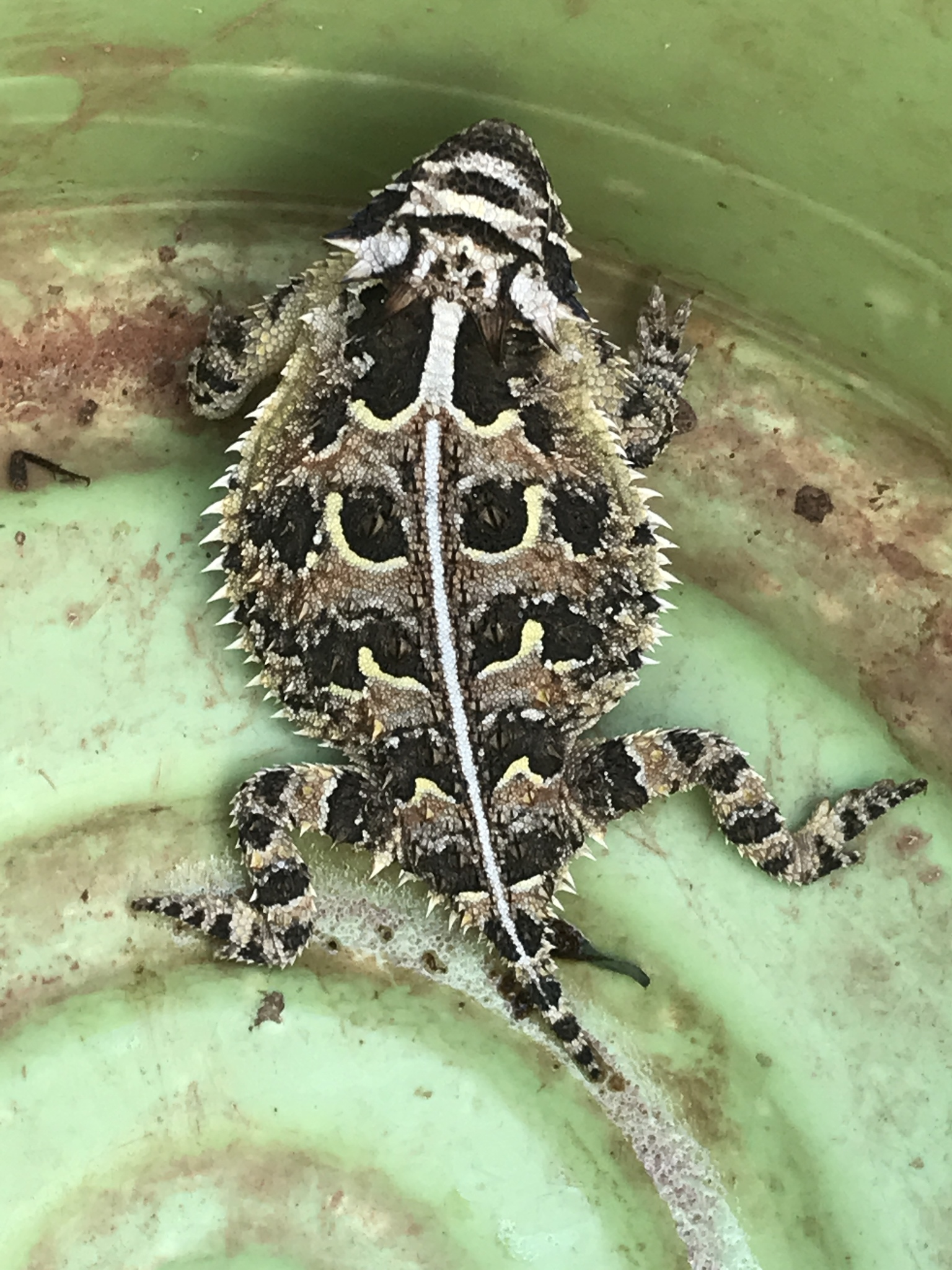
In Oklahoma

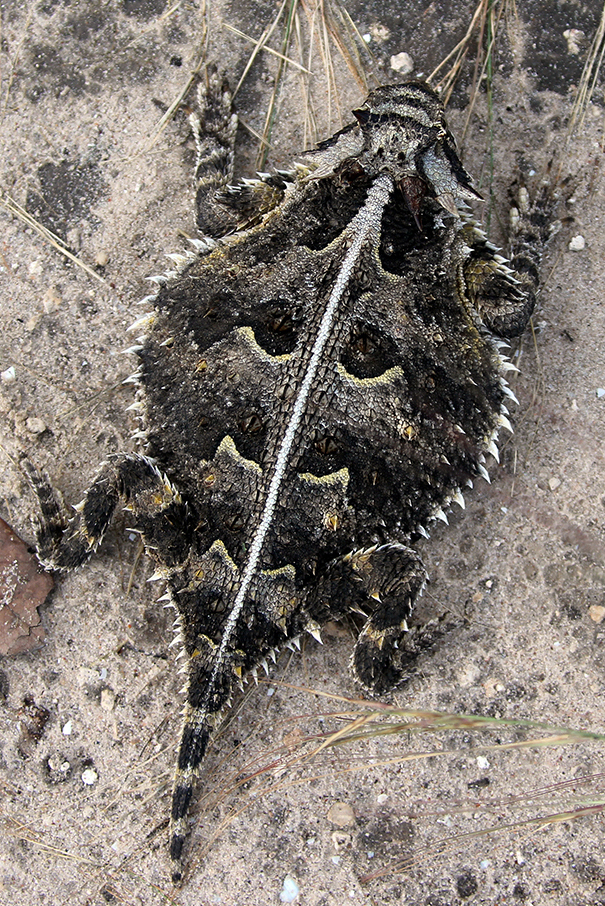
In Texas

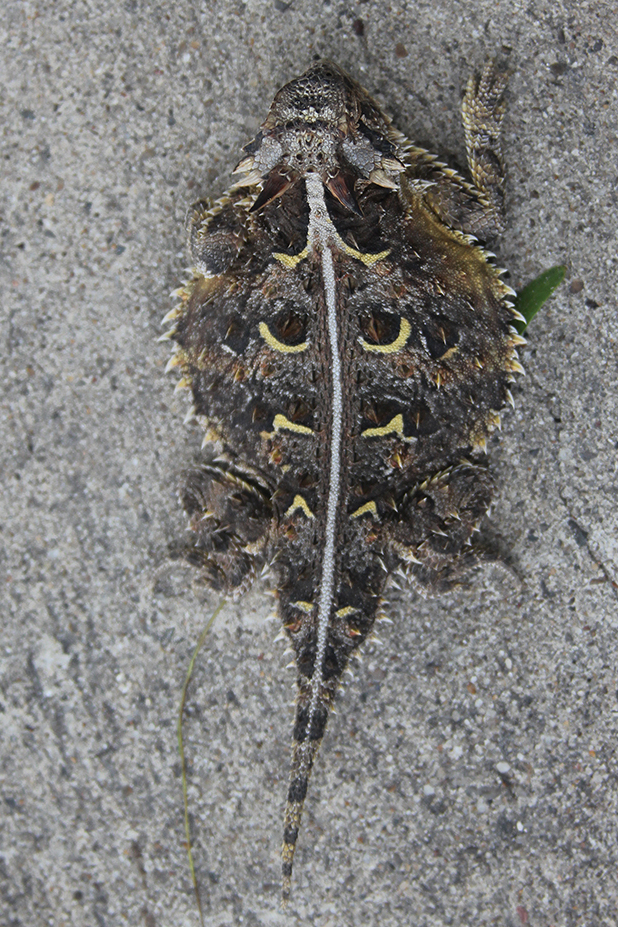
In Texas

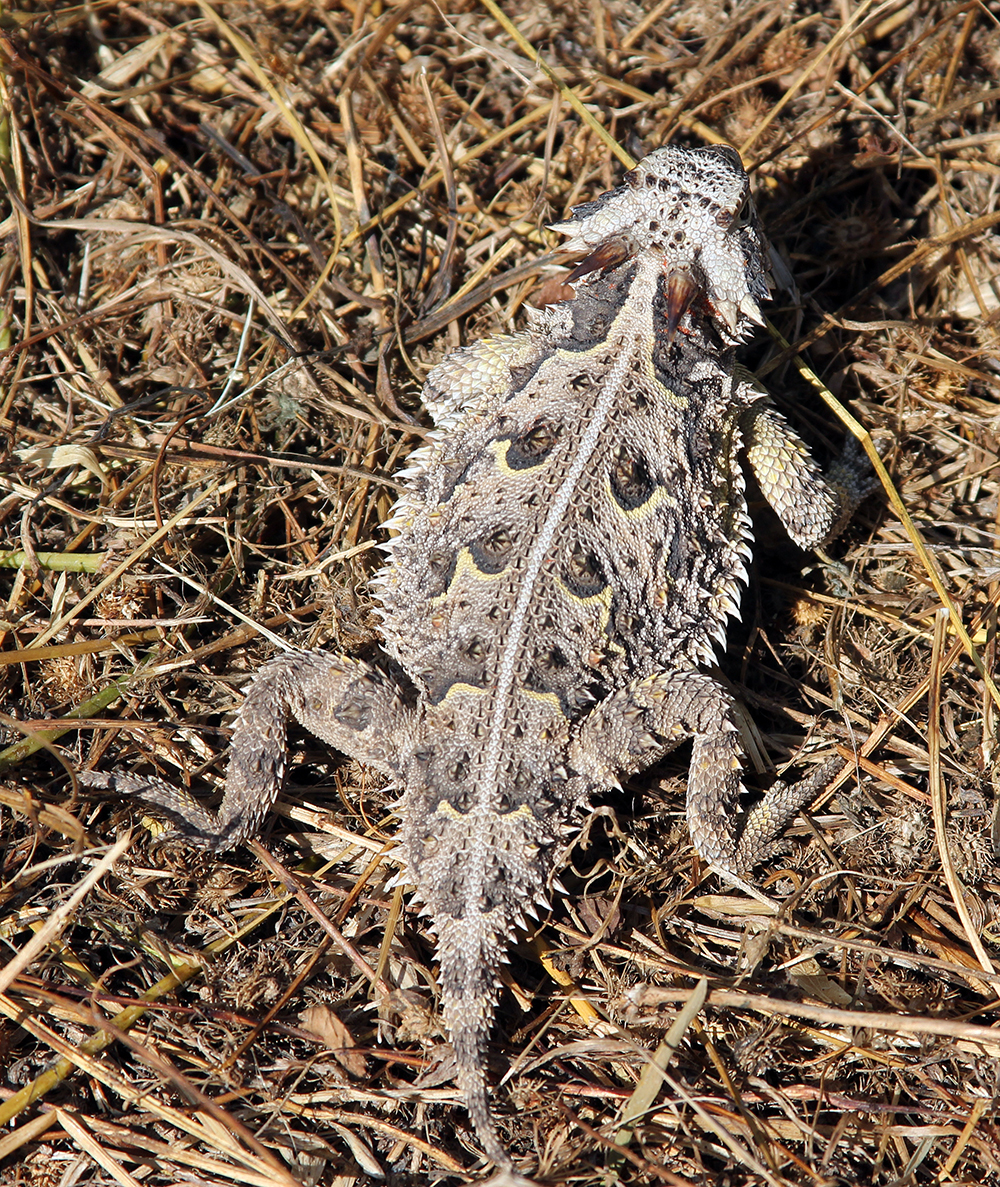
In Texas

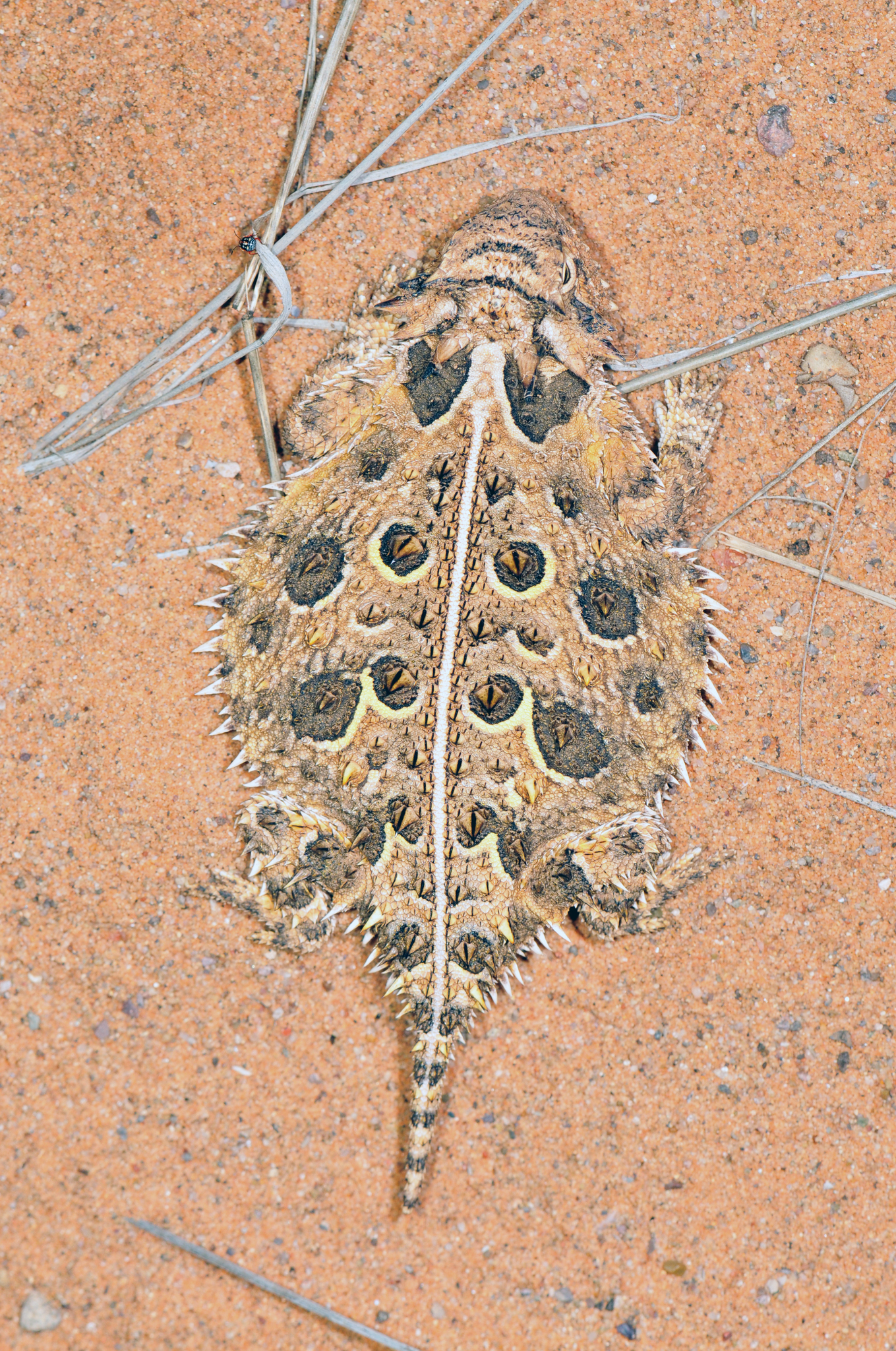
In New Mexico

== Behavior ==
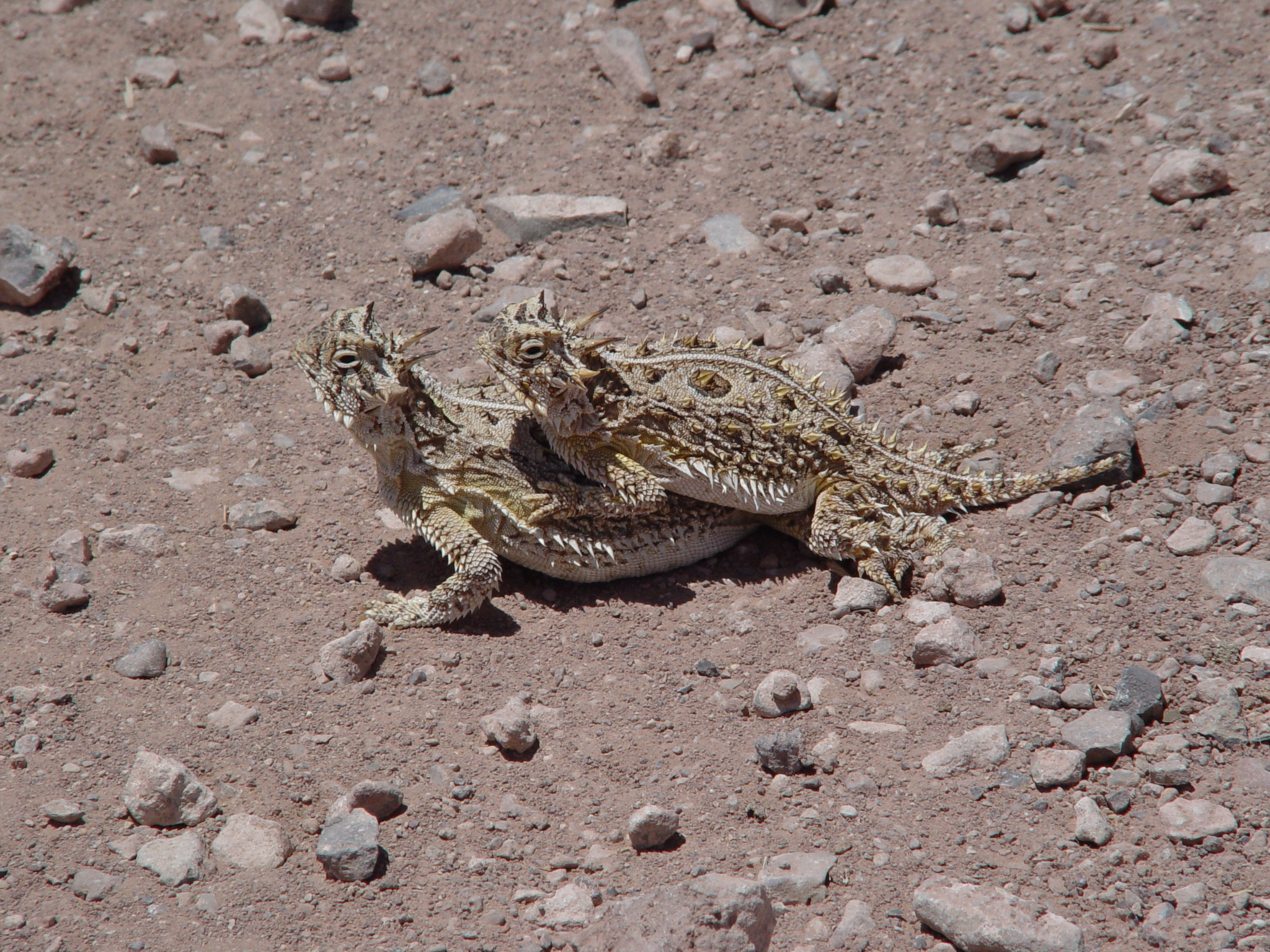
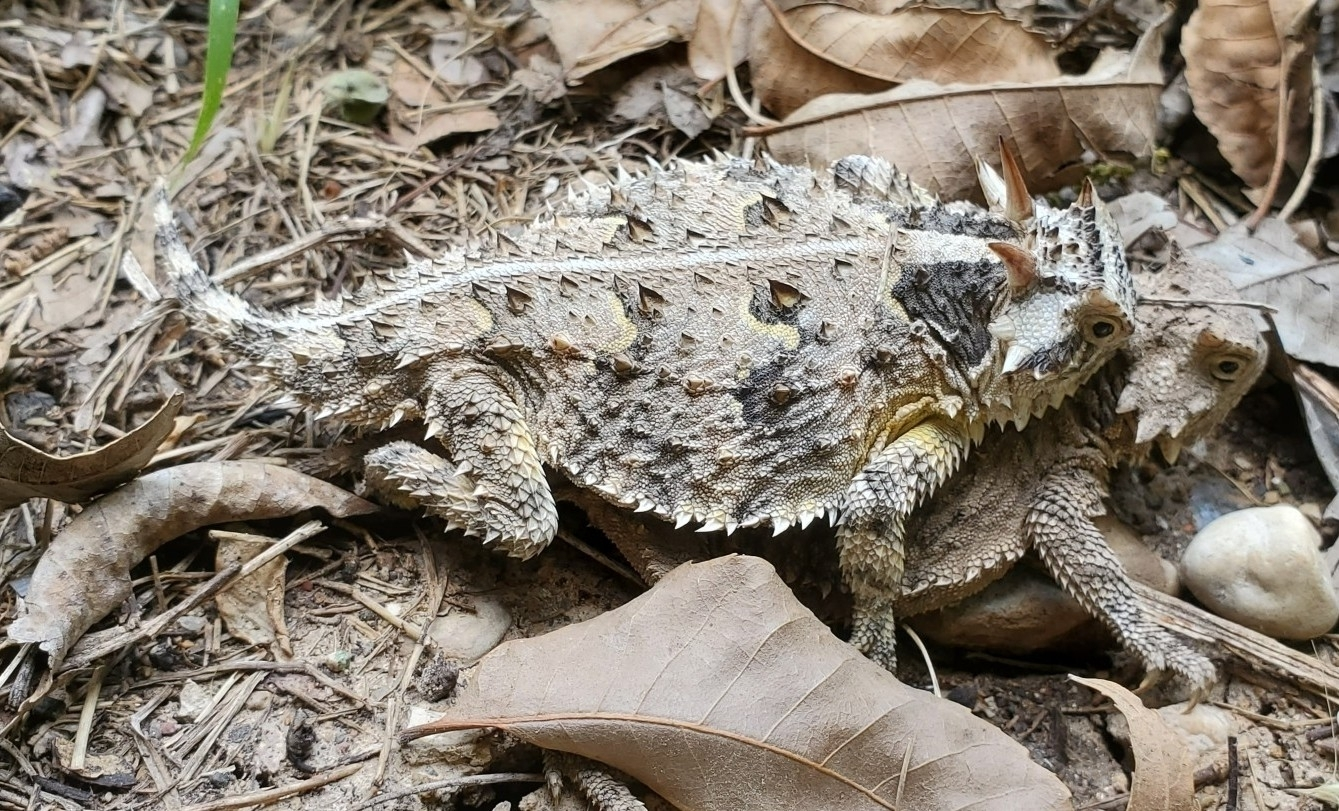
Mating, in New Mexico (top) and Texas (bottom)

Despite the fierce appearance, Texas horned lizards are extremely docile creatures. The Texas horned lizard is a sunbather, and requires bright sunlight to produce vitamin D. Deprived of sunlight, the animal is unable to produce vitamin D and can suffer from vitamin deficiency. So, horned lizards are most often found along the side of roads or other open, rocky areas, where they can lounge and take in sunlight. At night, the lizard buries itself in sand. Although they prefer to move very little, horned lizards can move quite fast if they feel a predator is in the area, and dart into thick grass and foliage to escape. Horned lizards are also excellent diggers, and can quickly burrow underground to escape threats. They use their forelimbs to dig burrows in which they deposit eggs. Horned lizards are often found near harvester ant colonies which are a major part of their diet. Their daily movement is averaged at 50 m (160 ft). They hibernate in burrows averaging in depth at 140 mm (5.5 in) and often have them face south/southwest for maximum sun exposure.

=== Defense ===
Although its coloration generally serves as camouflage against predation, when threatened by a predator, a horned lizard puffs up and appears very fat, which causes its body scales to protrude, making it difficult to swallow. Horned lizards will also use their horns to stab predators.

==== Autohaemorrhaging ====
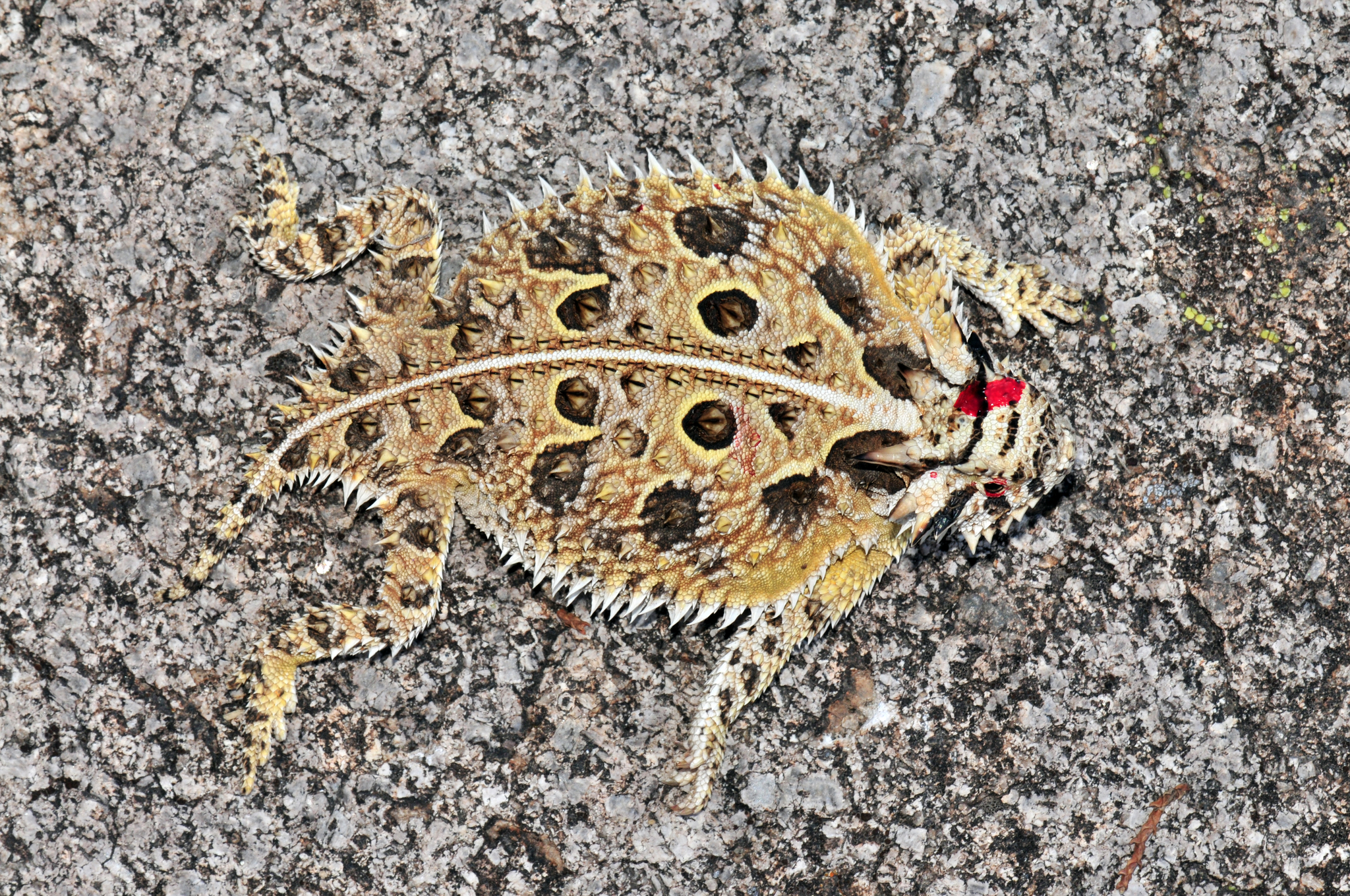
Showing blood from autohaemorrhaging, in New Mexico

The Texas horned lizard, along with at least three other species of the genus Phrynosoma, also has the ability to squirt an aimed stream of blood from the corners of the eyes and sometimes from its mouth at a distance up to 5 ft (1.5 m). They do this by restricting the blood flow leaving the head, thereby increasing blood pressure and rupturing tiny vessels around the eyelids. This not only confuses would-be predators, but also the blood is mixed with a chemical that is foul-tasting to canine predators such as wolves, coyotes, and domestic dogs. This novel behavior is generally observed to be very effective in defense; however, it appears to have no effect against predatory birds. Research has found the elicitation of blood squirting to be context dependent depending on predator type, where canids are the most likely to elicit it. They can lose up to 6 percent of their body weight when performing this.

== Diet ==
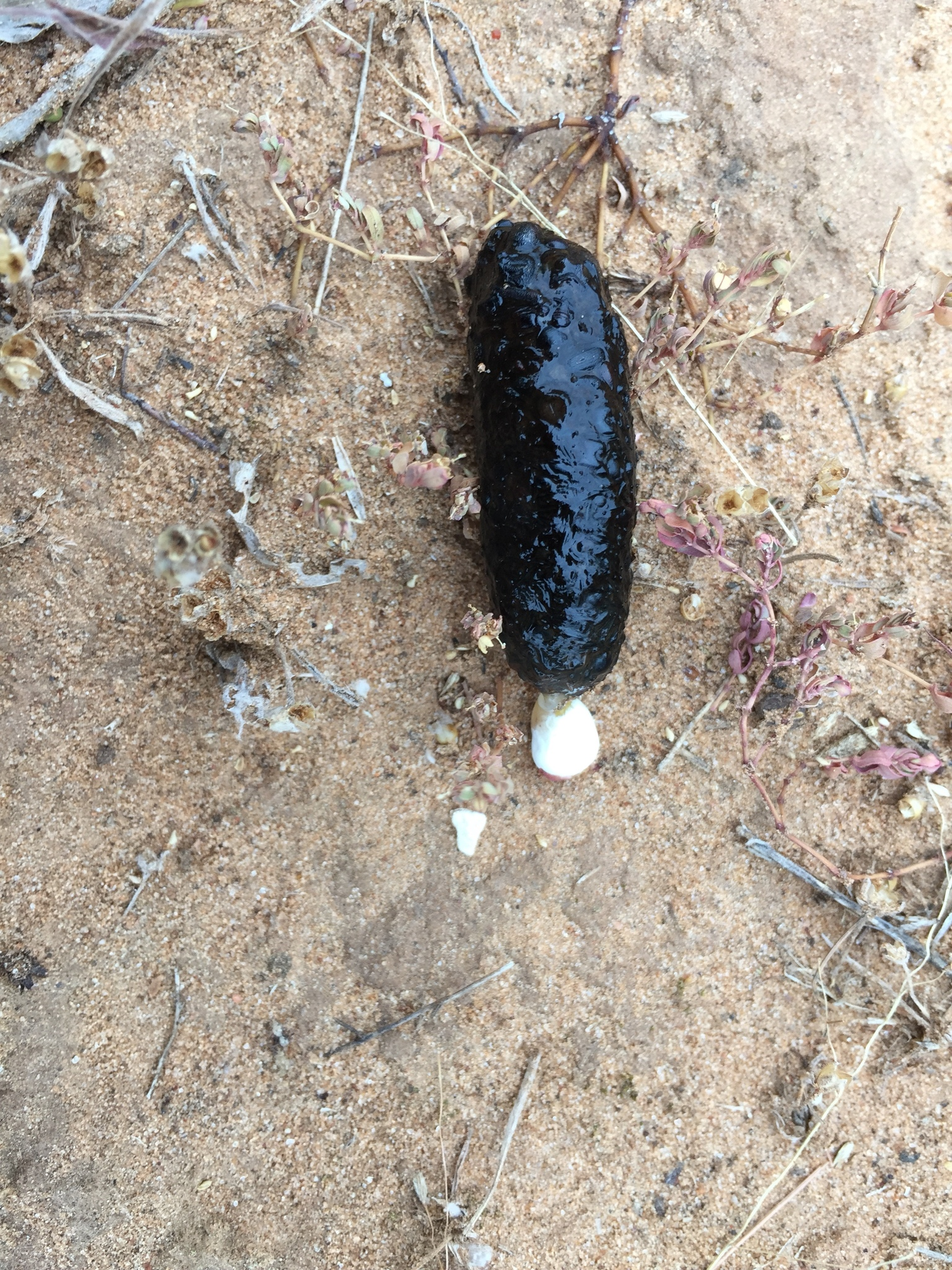
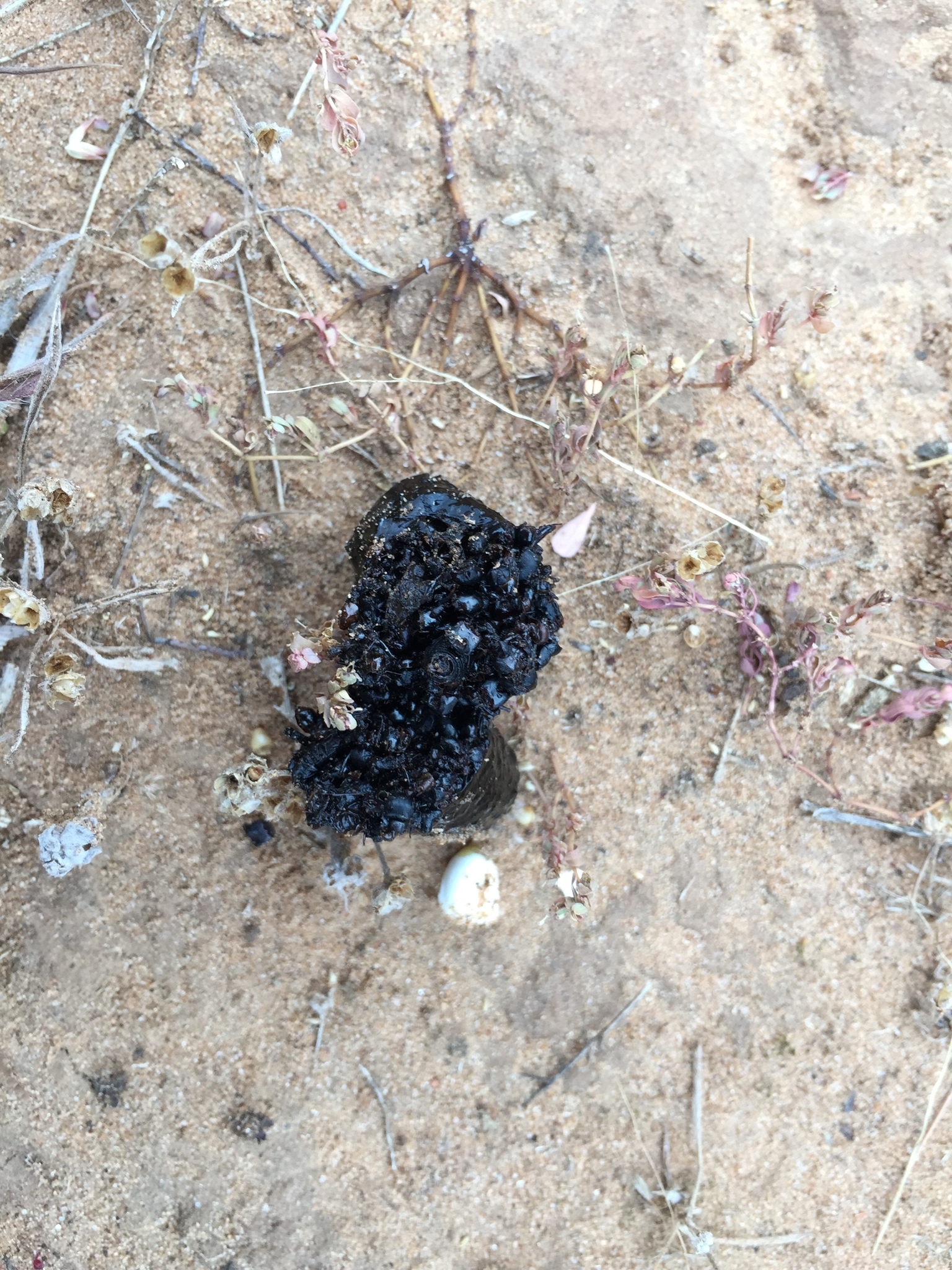
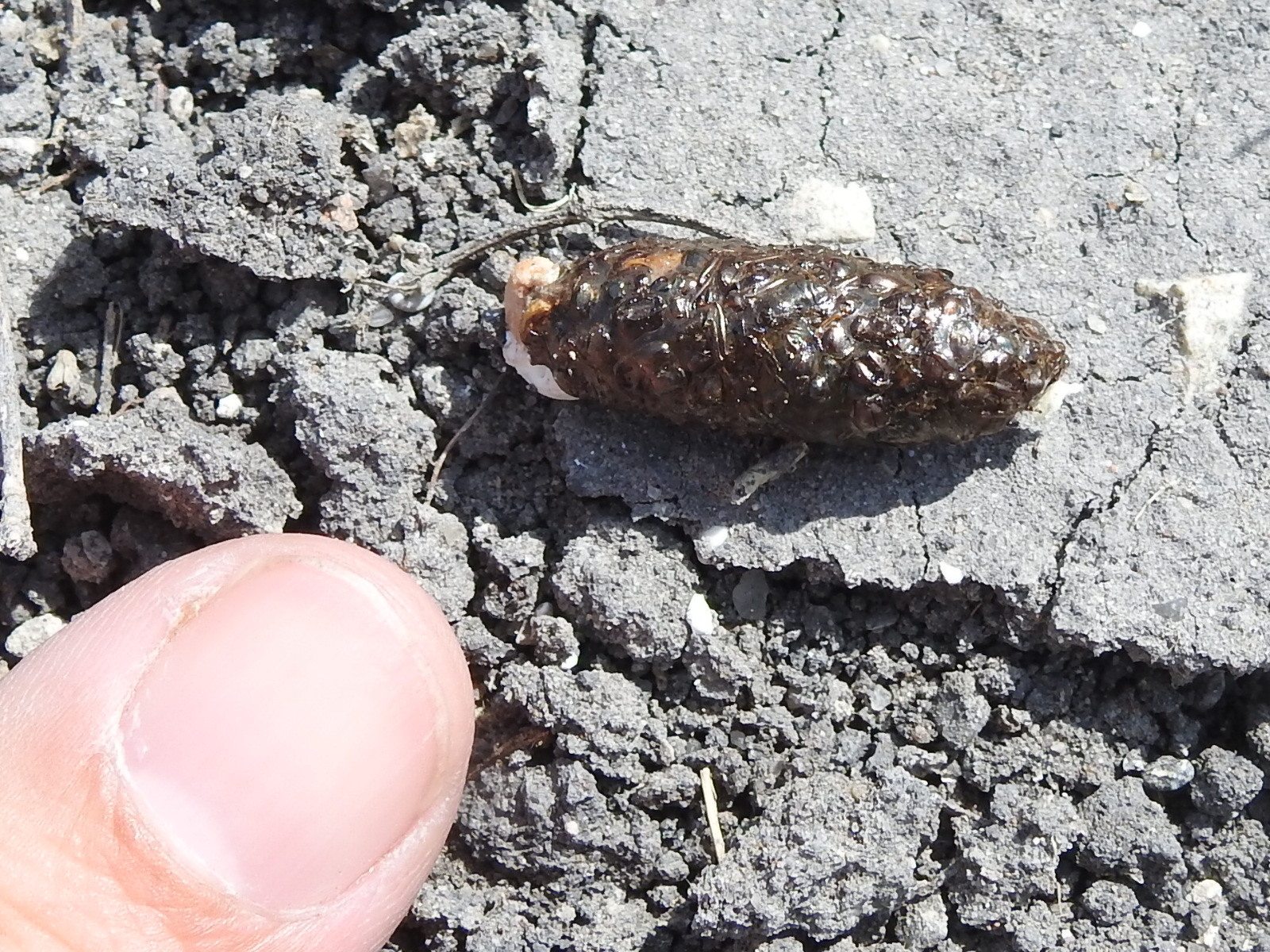
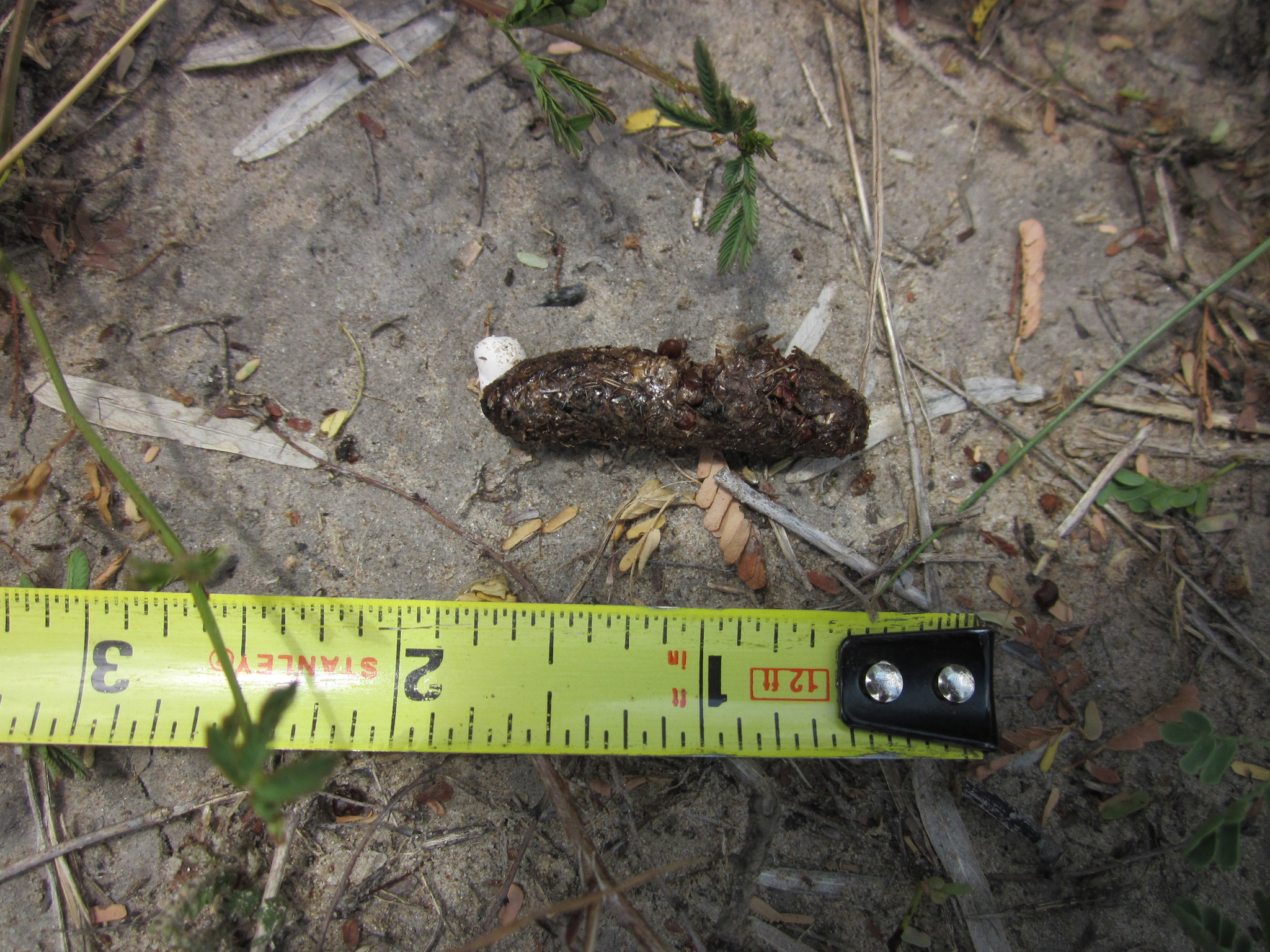
Texas horned lizard scat

Like all horned lizards, Texas horned lizards are specialized predators. About 70% of the Texas horned lizard's diet is made up of harvester ants, though they supplement these with termites, beetles, and grasshoppers. Texas horned lizards possess a blood plasma factor that neutralizes harvester ant venom and are known to produce copious amounts of mucus in the esophagus and pharynx which function to embed and incapacitate swallowed ants. They perform an entire cycle of prey capture within one single feeding stage, that is commonly seen in other iguanian lizards. During retraction, the tongue and hyobranchium move ventrally, clearing the bolus of any intraoral contact as the ant is moved directly into the pharynx.

== Conservation ==
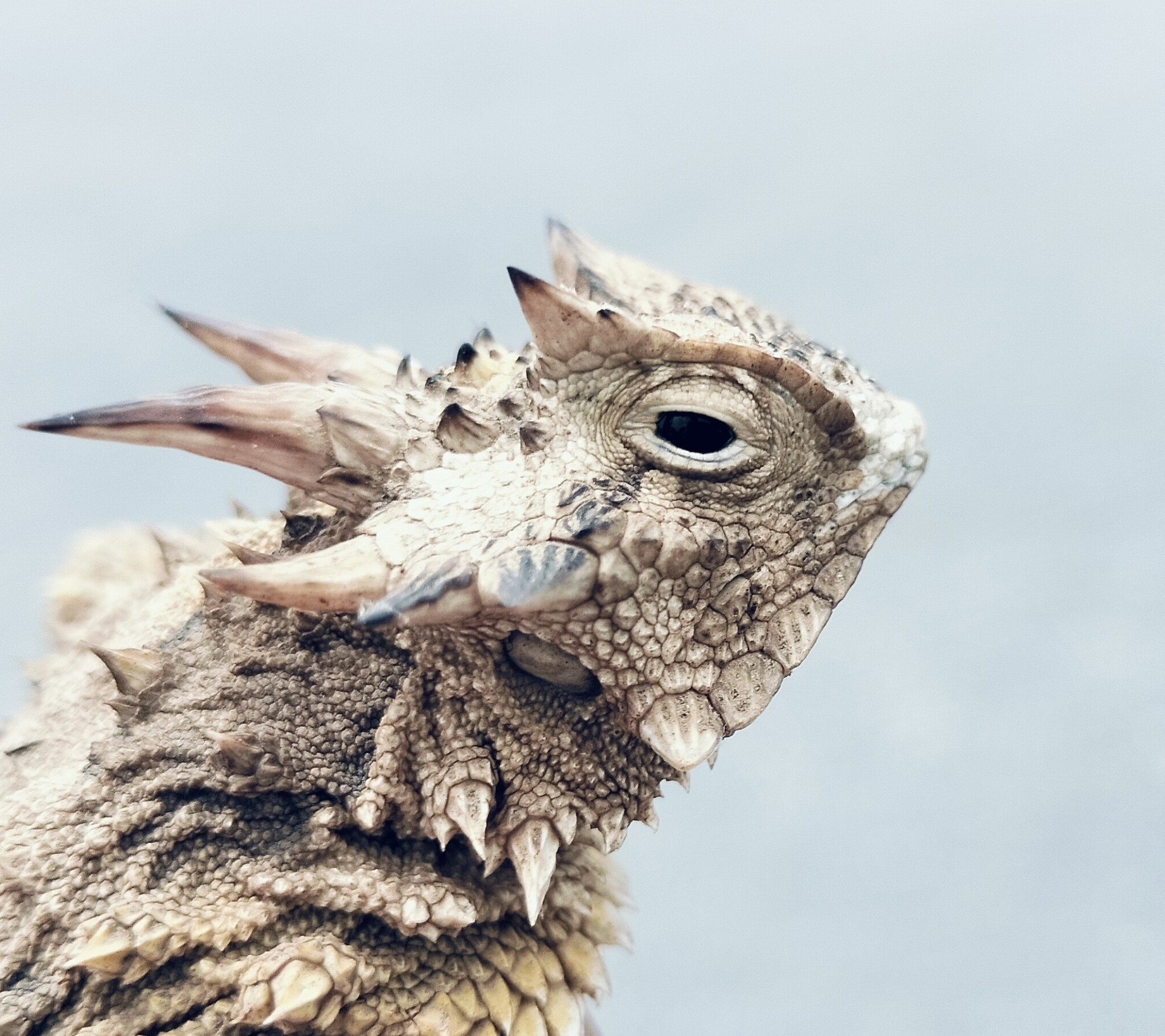
At Tamaulipas (Mexico)

In recent years, the species has declined by about 30% of its range, though it may be making a comeback. The decline is usually blamed on overuse of pesticides and the spread of nonnative, highly aggressive and fiercely territorial red imported fire ants. Both eradicate harvester ant colonies, destroying the lizard's principal source of food. The Texas horned lizard is now a protected species, and, in Texas, it is illegal to take, possess, transport or sell them without a special permit.

Texas Horned Lizards are classified as a species of least concern on the IUCN red list, although they are listed as threatened in Texas. A University of Texas publication notes that horned lizard populations continue to disappear throughout the southwest despite protective legislation. The Texas horned lizard has disappeared from almost half of its geographic range. Population declines are attributed to increased urbanization, habitat fragmentation, habitat isolation, loss of habitat, human eradication of the ant populations upon which the lizards prey, displacement of native ant populations by invading fire ants (aided by synergistic effects of native ant eradication), and predation by domestic dogs and cats. However, some research has found indications that human-modified environments that have suitable habitat and food resources, such as small towns, may provide a refuge for horned lizards from predators.

In 2014, the Center for Biological Diversity in Tucson, Arizona, petitioned the Oklahoma Department of Wildlife Conservation to have the Texas horned lizard put on the endangered species list due to the massive decline of its population in Oklahoma, where it was once plentiful. The Center said it may later seek protection for the animal on a Federal level; it also said that reptiles in general are dying off at up to 10,000 times their historic extinction rate, greatly due to human influences.

=== Captive breeding ===
In Texas, the creature has been declared threatened and a breeding and reintroduction program has been started by the Fort Worth Zoo. Hatchlings are bred and released in targeted areas in the hope that with a large number of animals, enough will survive to grow the population in the wild. Typically in such reptile reintroduction programs, fewer than one percent of a female's offspring will survive in the wild to adulthood.

In addition, the Dallas Zoo and Houston Zoo are working to establish a captive colony of animals with several key reproductive successes taking place in 2015, while the Center for Conservation & Research (CCR) at the San Antonio Zoo is teaming up with private landowners to introduce zoo hatched lizards into areas that they previously inhabited.

== Current research ==
Horned lizards are studied by researchers at Texas Christian University, the nearby Fort Worth Zoo, and Dallas Zoo with raw data and fieldwork done by state employees. Since 2010, the Dallas Zoo has been conducting a mark-and-recapture study on Texas horned lizards on the Rolling Plains Quail Research Ranch, a 4,700 acres (19 km^{2}) preserve located in Fisher County, Texas. Dallas Zoo researchers capture animals, tag them, collect data, and release them. The project's goals are aimed at shedding light on the life history, population density, and determining ecological conditions best suited for this threatened species. Further research toward their preservation is funded by sale of horned lizard "Keep Texas Wild" license plates.

== In culture ==
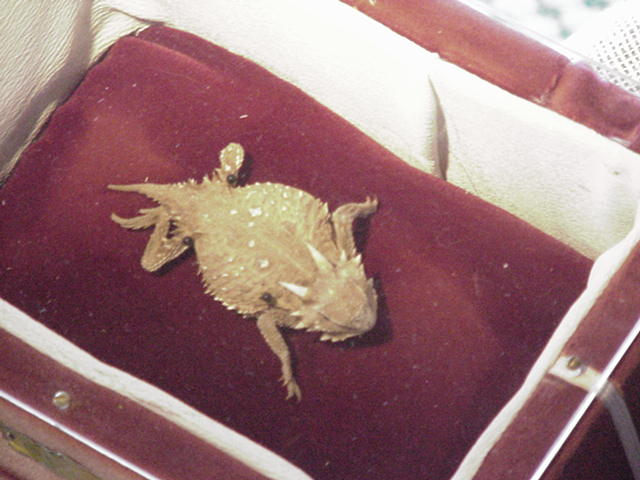
Coffin containing the purported body of Ol' Rip in Eastland County Courthouse

The Texas horned lizard is the state reptile of Texas and, as the "horned frog", is the mascot of Texas Christian University and can be seen in the university's seal.

In 1928, Ol' Rip the Horned Toad became a national sensation after supposedly surviving a 31-year entombment in a cornerstone time capsule in Eastland, Texas. He toured the country, met President Calvin Coolidge, and the demand for horned toads as pets led to an abrupt decline in their wild population. In 1955, Ol' Rip inspired the original story of the frog in the animated cartoon One Froggy Evening who was later named Michigan J. Frog.

=== In Native American religion and art ===
Some Native American people regard horned lizards as sacred. The animal is a common motif in Native American art in the Southwestern United States and Mexico.

== See also ==
- Ceratophrys
