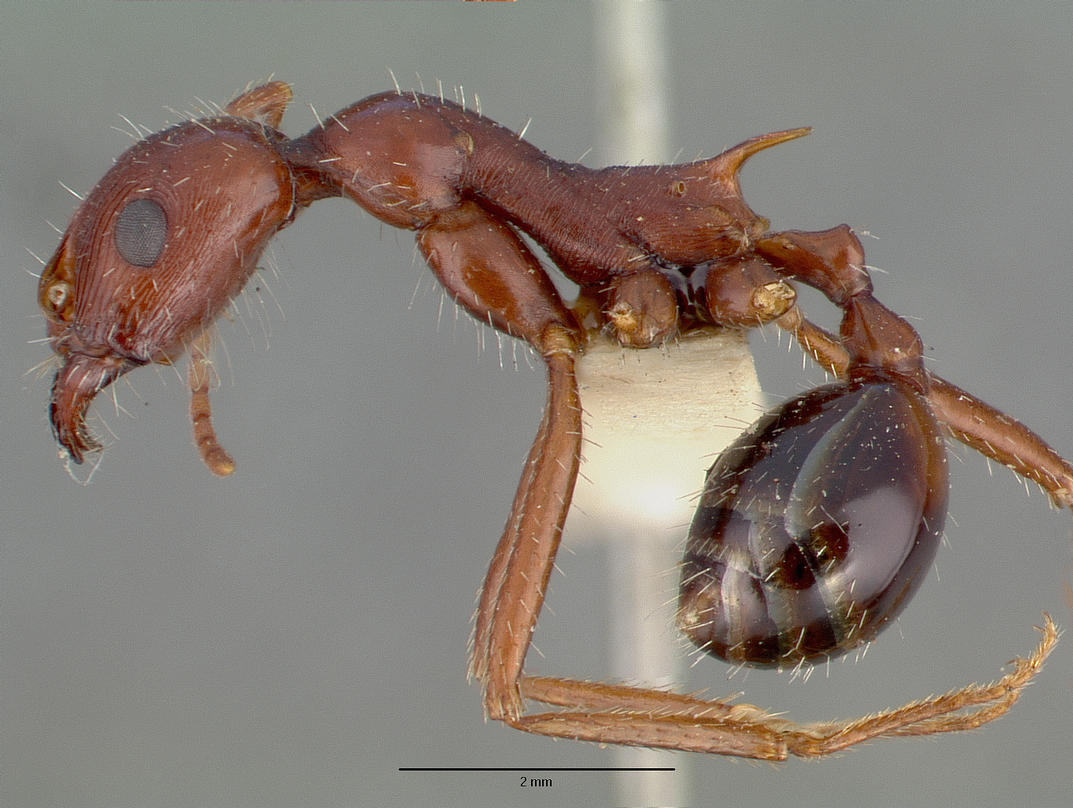
- Novomessor cockerelli worker

Scientific classification
- Kingdom: Animalia
- Phylum: Arthropoda
- Class: Insecta
- Order: Hymenoptera
- Family: Formicidae
- Subfamily: Myrmicinae
- Tribe: Stenammini
- Genus: Novomessor; Emery, 1915

Type species
- Aphaenogaster cockerelli, now Novomessor cockerelli

Diversity
- 3 species

= Novomessor =

Genus of ants

Novomessor is a genus of ants that was described by Italian entomologist Carlo Emery in 1915. Until recently, the genus was thought to be a synonym of Aphaenogaster, but a 2015 phylogenetic study concluded that the two genera were distinct, reviving Novomessor from synonymy. Three species are currently described. This genus is known to inhabit the deserts of southwestern United States and Northern Mexico.

== Species ==
- Novomessor albisetosus (Mayr, 1886)
- Novomessor cockerelli (André, 1893)
- Novomessor ensifer (Forel, 1899)
