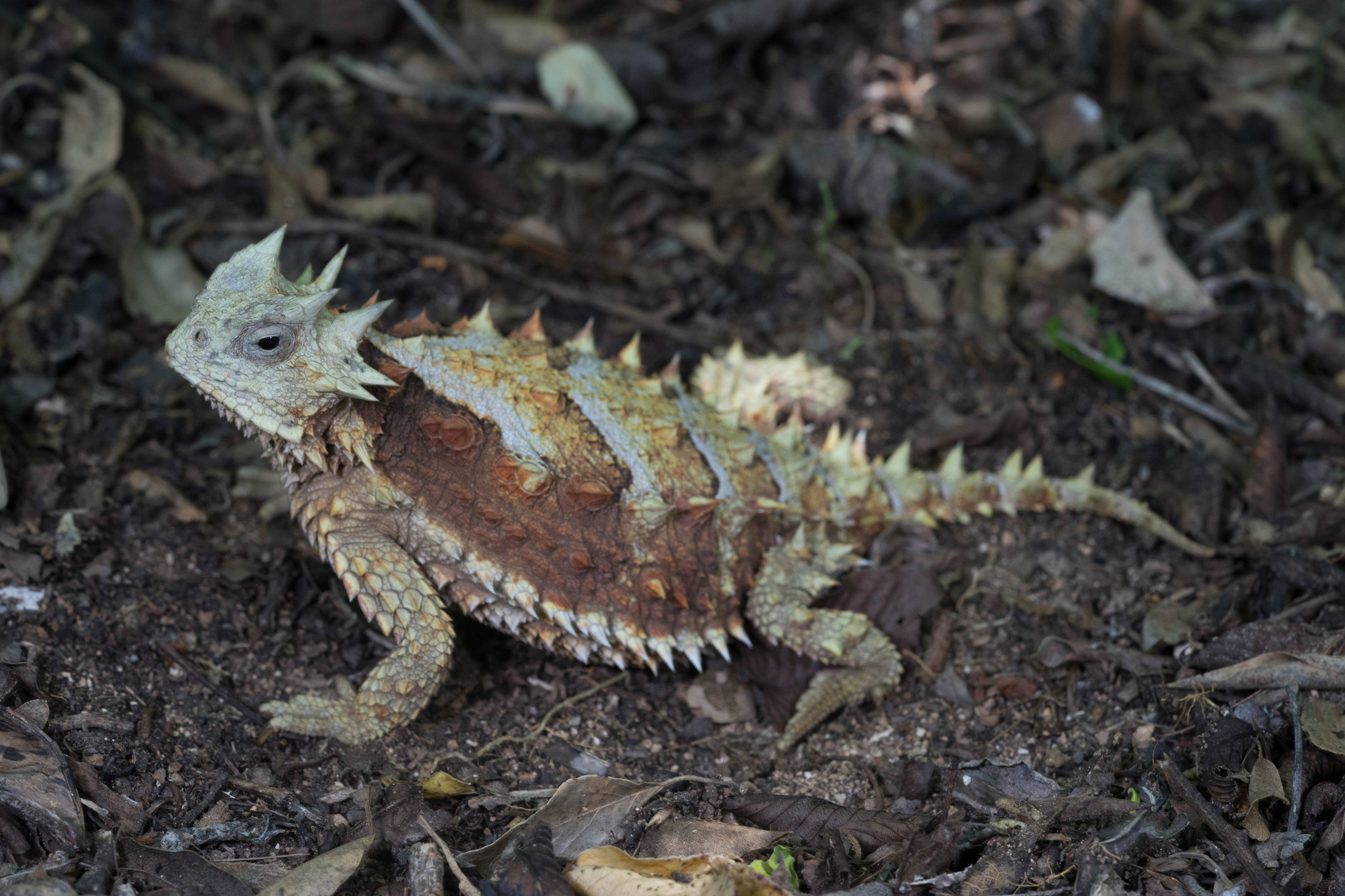

Conservation status
- Least Concern (IUCN 3.1)

Scientific classification
- Kingdom: Animalia
- Phylum: Chordata
- Class: Reptilia
- Order: Squamata
- Suborder: Iguania
- Family: Phrynosomatidae
- Genus: Phrynosoma
- Species: P. asio

Binomial name
- Phrynosoma asio Cope, 1864

= Giant horned lizard =

Species of lizard

The giant horned lizard (Phrynosoma asio) is a species of phrynosomatid lizard which is endemic to the Pacific coast of southern Mexico. It is the largest horned lizard and is also the most slender (it has a more typical lizard-like appearance). It is able to survive in the desert. The spines on its back and sides are made from modified scales, whereas the horns on its head are true horns (i.e., they have a bony core). They are commonly named for their large size, which can reach up to 6 to 8 inches (15 to 20 cm) from snout to tail, hence the name.

== Gallery ==
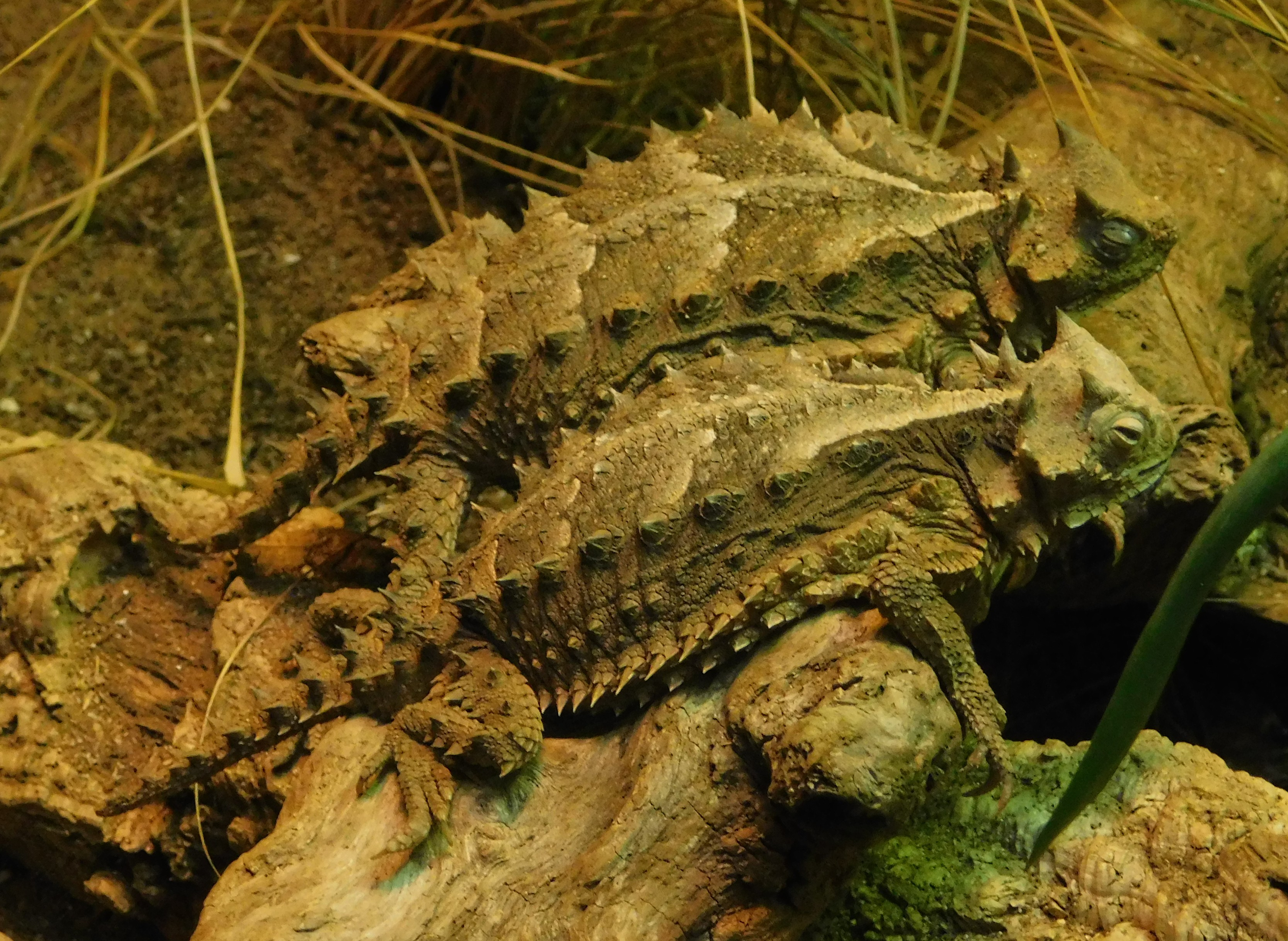
San Diego Zoo

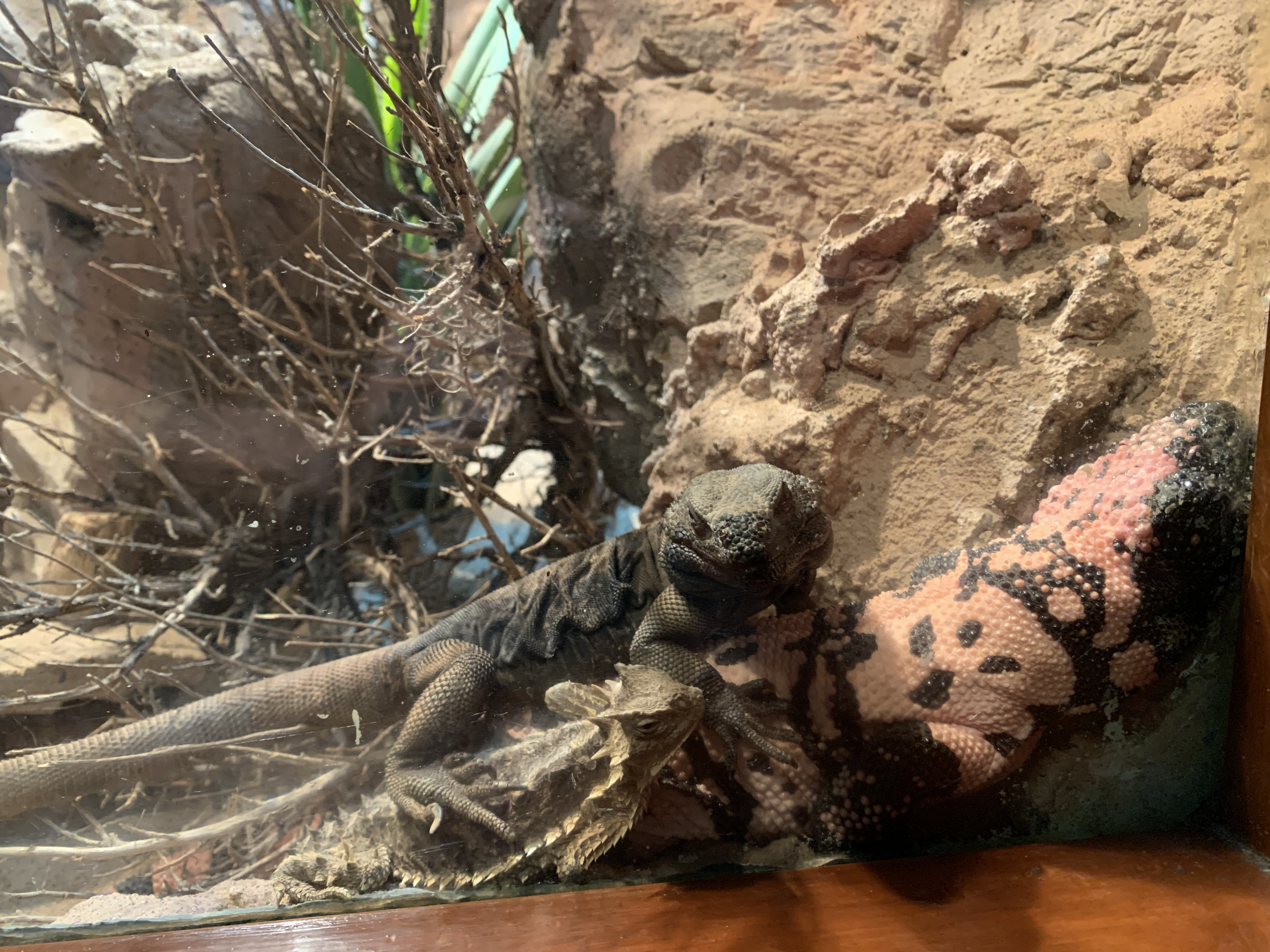
With a common chuckwalla and a gila monster, at the Bronx Zoo

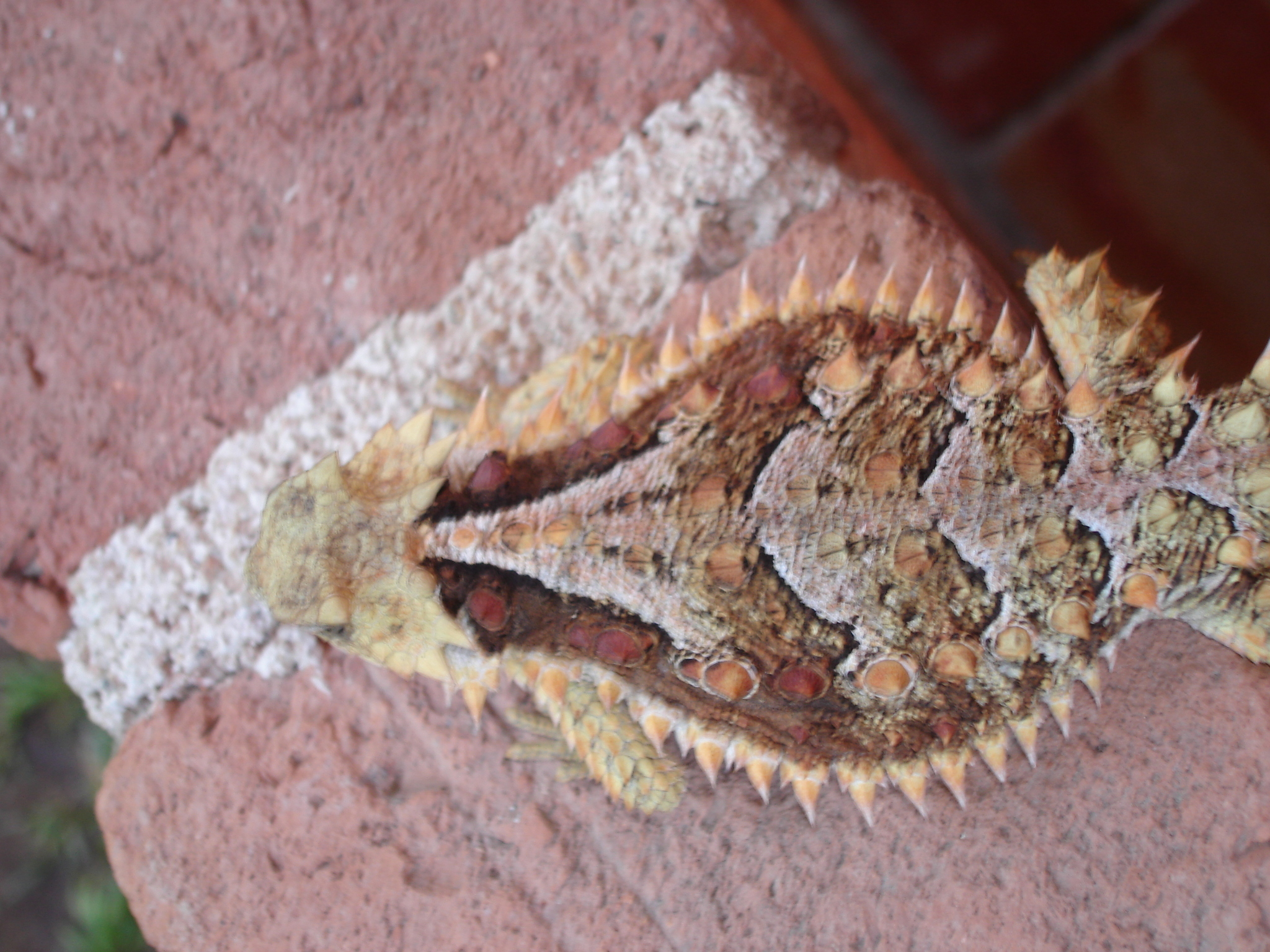
Showing dorsal patterns, in Jalisco
