= Novomessor cockerelli =

Scientific classification
- Kingdom: Animalia
- Phylum: Arthropoda
- Clade: Pancrustacea
- Class: Insecta
- Order: Hymenoptera
- Family: Formicidae
- Subfamily: Myrmicinae
- Genus: Novomessor
- Species: N. cockerelli

Binomial name
- Novomessor cockerelli (André, 1893)

Synonyms
- Aphaenogaster cockerelli

Species of ant

Novomessor cockerelli is a species of ant in the subfamily Myrmicinae. It is native to the deserts of the Southwestern United States and Mexico. It lives in large underground colonies in which there is a single queen. The worker ants leave the nest daily to forage for seeds, plant material and dead insects.

== Description ==
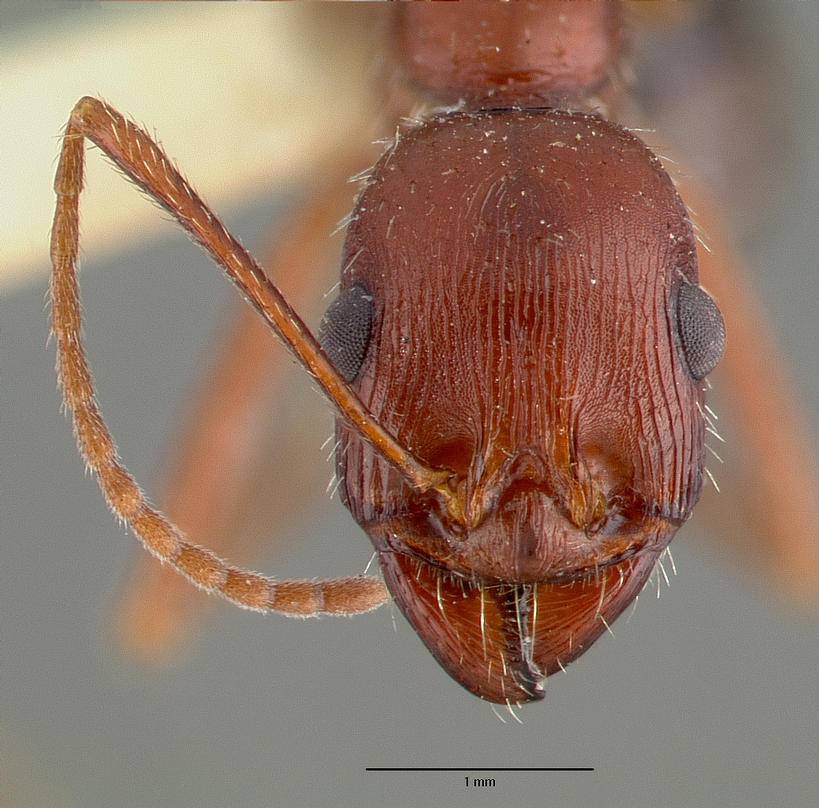
Head of worker

Novomessor cockerelli is a large brown ant with a blackish gaster, long legs and an elongated head. It can be recognised by the two distinctive spines on the propodeum. It can be distinguished from the rather similar Novomessor albisetosus by the shape of its head. It cannot sting but is very aggressive and has a powerful bite.

== Distribution and habitat ==
Novomessor cockerelli is found in arid areas of the Southwestern United States including Texas and the Franklin Mountains, New Mexico, Arizona, Nevada and California. It is also present in northern Mexico in the states of Sonora, Chihuahua, Durango, Coahuila and Nuevo León. Its typical habitat is upland plains includes desert areas with ocotillo (Fouquieria splendens), cactus, creosote bush, mesquite, sagebrush and thorn scrub at altitudes of between 518 and 1,877 m (1,699 and 6,158 ft) above sea level.

== Behavior ==
Novomessor cockerelli forms large underground colonies, sometimes with multiple entrances, on open ground or beside rocks. The nest tends to be surrounded by a midden, a circle of tiny pebbles and plant remains. The worker ants normally leave the nest to forage in the early morning and in the evening, at which times the ground temperature is within the range 20 to 40 °C (68 to 104 °F). During the winter they may forage throughout the day. Seeds and plant material are collected but nearly half of the diet consists of the corpses of insects. These ants scavenge around carcases for dead insects such as flies. When a prey item is found that is too large for a single ant to carry, other ants are recruited by the use of pheromones. The original ant liberates a glandular secretion which attracts other workers within about two metres (yards) of the release point. If this fails to summon enough assistance, it releases a further secretion on the ground and lays a trail back to the colony. Other ants are attracted to follow the trail and then work co-operatively to transport the food item back to the nest. The trail is short-lived and soon evaporates.

In the Chihuahuan Desert, Novomessor cockerelli competes for resources with another seed-eating ant species, the red harvester ant (Pogonomyrmex barbatus). It has been found that workers of N. cockerelli will emerge from the nest early in the morning and plug the entrance holes of nearby P. barbatus colonies with grit and small stones thus delaying the emergence of the other workers. Nests close to the N. cockerelli home nest are plugged more often than ones far away, and older, larger nests have their entrances plugged more often than younger, smaller ones.

In the Chihuahuan Desert, nuptial flights of Novomessor cockerelli occur in July at dusk. After returning to the ground, newly mated females soon remove their wings. They are not permitted by workers to enter established nests, but must find a new colony on their own. Each colony contains a single queen. She uses bodily secretions to prevent other colony members from laying viable eggs. The workers spend little time licking or grooming the queen and it is unclear exactly how her control of the colony comes about. It may be related to the coating of the eggs she lays, because the workers which care for them do lick them. The queen has a gland called the Dufour’s gland which secretes a chemical that she uses to mark any reproductive workers that may be present in the nest. This causes other worker ants to attack the marked ants and helps her maintain her dominant position.

In an established colony, workers do not regurgitate food to give to the queen but instead lay trophic eggs for her to eat, and these eggs are also fed to the queen larvae. Workers seem to have alternating periods when they either go out to forage or they stay in the nest and tend the brood, at which time they are capable of producing trophic eggs. In a colony that has been deprived of its queen, some of the workers begin to lay and tend viable eggs after a few weeks, and these all develop into males. The colony ceases to exist when the males have emerged and all the workers have come to the end of their lives.
