= List of modern jeepney models =

The following articles list named standardized models of jeepneys, a common mode of transportation used in the Philippines.

Most traditional jeepneys have no standard construction hence will not be part of this list. There are also common practice in jeepney construction depending on the region. Also it is common practice to use an existing vehicle model by larger automobile manufacturers as a base in jeepney assembly. In Iloilo the manufacturers use the Honda Civic or Toyota Corolla as base. In Bacolod, jeepneys often have a makeup to that of Asian Utility Vehicle (AUV).

For the purpose of this list, only models which could be traced to a manufacturer is included. The list includes vehicles that are often considered as "jeepneys" by the media, authoritative sources, and the manufacturers themselves, which may be considered by some to be mini-buses due to their make-up deviating from the traditional jeepney design.

== List ==
Model	Year introduced	Chassis Manufacturer	Manufacturer/Distributor	Vehicle description
Bagong Jeep	2016	Jinbei	IKK Ichigan Sta. Rosa Motor Works	Used by the BEEP Rides public transport system in Metro Manila and Cebu City. Some vehicles have their own air-conditioning system and are equipped with GPS tracking devices, dashboard cameras and CCTV cameras. BEEP vehicles, depending on the model, have the capacity to seat 16 to 26 passengers at a time.
Canter Commute	2018	Mitsubishi Fuso	Centro Manufacturing Almazora Motors	First revealed in 2018, the Class II Canter Commute is available with bodywork by Almazora, and Centro. It can hold up to 30 people seated and standing, and is available either with a tilt cab, or an integral cab-less body. The Class III variant, the Canter Express can fit 24 people seated, and has a 2+2 abreast configuration.
COMET	2014	EvDynamics Yangtse Bus	Global Electric Transport	An electric minibus often described as an e-jeep, the City Optimized Managed Electric Transport (COMET) was first used for public transport in Quezon City in September 2014. The vehicle was relaunched on September 3, 2015 with changes made to increase its electrical range and adjustments to its air suspension.
FC 11	2023	Jiangsu Fengchuen New Energy Power Technology Co.	e-Future Motors PH	Styled after the classic jeepney but air-conditioned, the FC 11 electric jeepney is available as a Class II, with a capacity of 21 passengers seated, and is powered by a Lithium-iron-phosphate battery, with up to 200km of range.
HD50S HD48GT	2019	Hyundai Motors	Centro Manufacturing Del Monte Motor Works.	Released in 2019, the Hyundai HD50s PUV is available both as a Class II, and Class III with bodywork by Del Monte and Centro. The Class II version can fit 32 seated and standing, while the Class III version can seat 22 passengers maximum in a 1+2 abreast configuration. In 2021, the Class II variant was updated with the HD48GT chassis.
Hino 300	2018	Hino Motors	Sta. Rosa Motor Works Centro Manufacturing Hino Philippines	First constructed in 2018, the Hino 300 PUV is available as a Class II with bodywork by Sta. Rosa, Centro, and Hino Philippines, with a capacity of 23 passengers seated and standing. A Class III version is available by Centro, and Hino Philippines, with 23-25 passengers all seated in a 1+2 abreast, or 2+2 abreast configuration. Most units built by Hino Philippines have bodywork and fascia inspired by the Hino Poncho.
QKR77	2018	Isuzu	Sta. Rosa Motor Works Centro Manufacturing Almazora Motors	First unveiled at the DOTr PUV Exhibition, and based on the 5th generation Isuzu Elf, The Isuzu QKR PUV was available as a Class II with bodies made by Centro, and Almazora Motors, and as a Class III with bodies made by Sta. Rosa, and Almazora Motors. It can hold up to 23 passengers seated and standing, and has since been discontinued and superseded by the 6th generation Isuzu NLR77.
Solar Jeepney	–	Unknown	Star 8 Green Technology Corp.	Solar-powered jeepney with closed, open-air, and air-conditioned variants. Meralco subsidiary eSakay has acquired Star 8's jeepneys for its fleet. eSakay planned to ply routes in Makati and Mandaluyong. The jeepneys are also used as public transport in Tacloban since 2018 and in Ormoc since 2019.
SR Jeepney Class II	2017 (prototype)	Unknown	Sta. Rosa Motor Works	Exhibited at the Philippine Auto Parts Expo, the SR Jeepney Class II is a prototype model by Sta. Rosa Motor Works which adheres to the standards made under the Public Utility Vehicle Modernization Program while retaining the aesthetics of the traditional jeepney of Manila.
