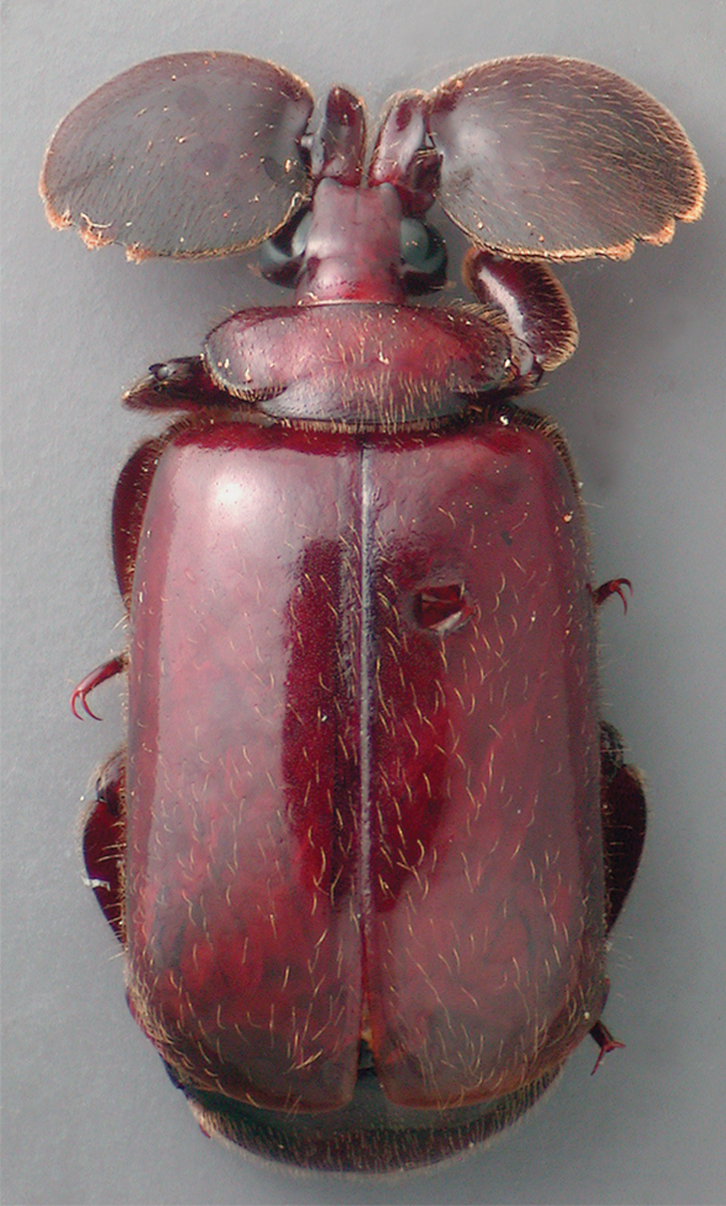
- Platyrhopalopsis melleii

Scientific classification
- Kingdom: Animalia
- Phylum: Arthropoda
- Class: Insecta
- Order: Coleoptera
- Suborder: Adephaga
- Family: Carabidae
- Subfamily: Paussinae
- Genus: Platyrhopalopsis; Desneux, 1905

Type species
- Platyrhopalus melleii Westwood, 1833

= Platyrhopalopsis =

Genus of beetles

Platyrhopalopsis is a genus of flanged-bombardier beetles in the family Carabidae. They are found, as in others of the group, within ant nests, in the Indo-Malayan region. Adults are rarely seen except at lights. The flat terminal segment of the antenna is thought, based on studies of pupal development, to be formed by the fusion of multiple antennomere segments. The genus, placed by some in the tribe Platyrhopalina, includes the following three species:

- Platyrhopalopsis melleii (Westwood, 1833) - Found in southern India. They are known from the nests of ants of the genus Carebara, particularly C. diversus.
- Platyrhopalopsis picteti (Westwood, 1874) - Found in Myanmar, Thailand, Vietnam, Laos, Cambodia.
