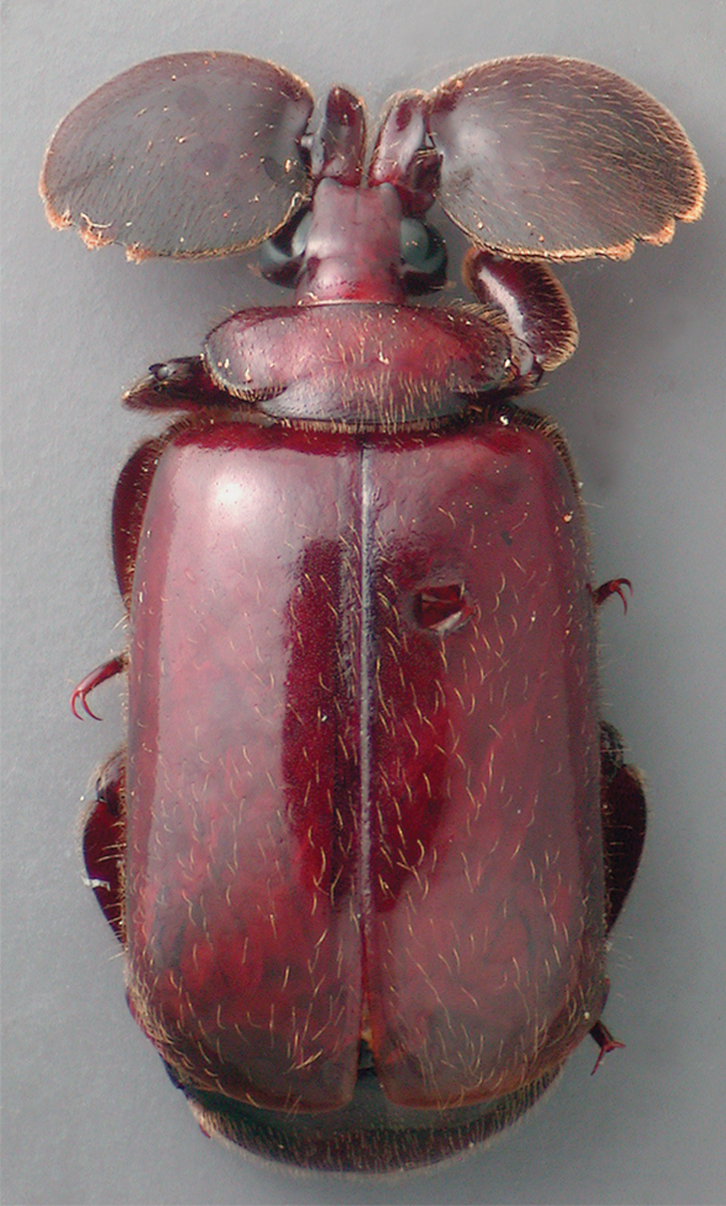
- A specimen collected in 1966

Scientific classification
- Kingdom: Animalia
- Phylum: Arthropoda
- Class: Insecta
- Order: Coleoptera
- Suborder: Adephaga
- Family: Carabidae
- Genus: Platyrhopalopsis
- Species: P. melleii

Binomial name
- Platyrhopalopsis melleii (Westwood, 1833)

Synonyms
- Platyrhopalus melleii

= Platyrhopalopsis melleii =

Species of bombardier beetle

Platyrhopalopsis melleii is a species of ant-nest or flanged bombardier beetle found in southern India. They live inside the nests of ants of the genus Carebara and adults are only rarely seen in the open, most often at night when they get attracted to lights.

The species was first described by J. O. Westwood as Platyrhopalus melleii, named after entomological collector André Melly of Manchester who had obtained a specimen from Malabar. Westwood however spelled the collector's name incorrectly as "Melley" and the species name has since been variously rendered in literature as meleii, mellyi or melleyi. Adults live inside the nests of ants of the genus Carebara and are rarely seen except when attracted to lights at night. The flat terminal segment of the antenna is thought, based on studies of pupal development, to be formed by the fusion of multiple antennomere segments.

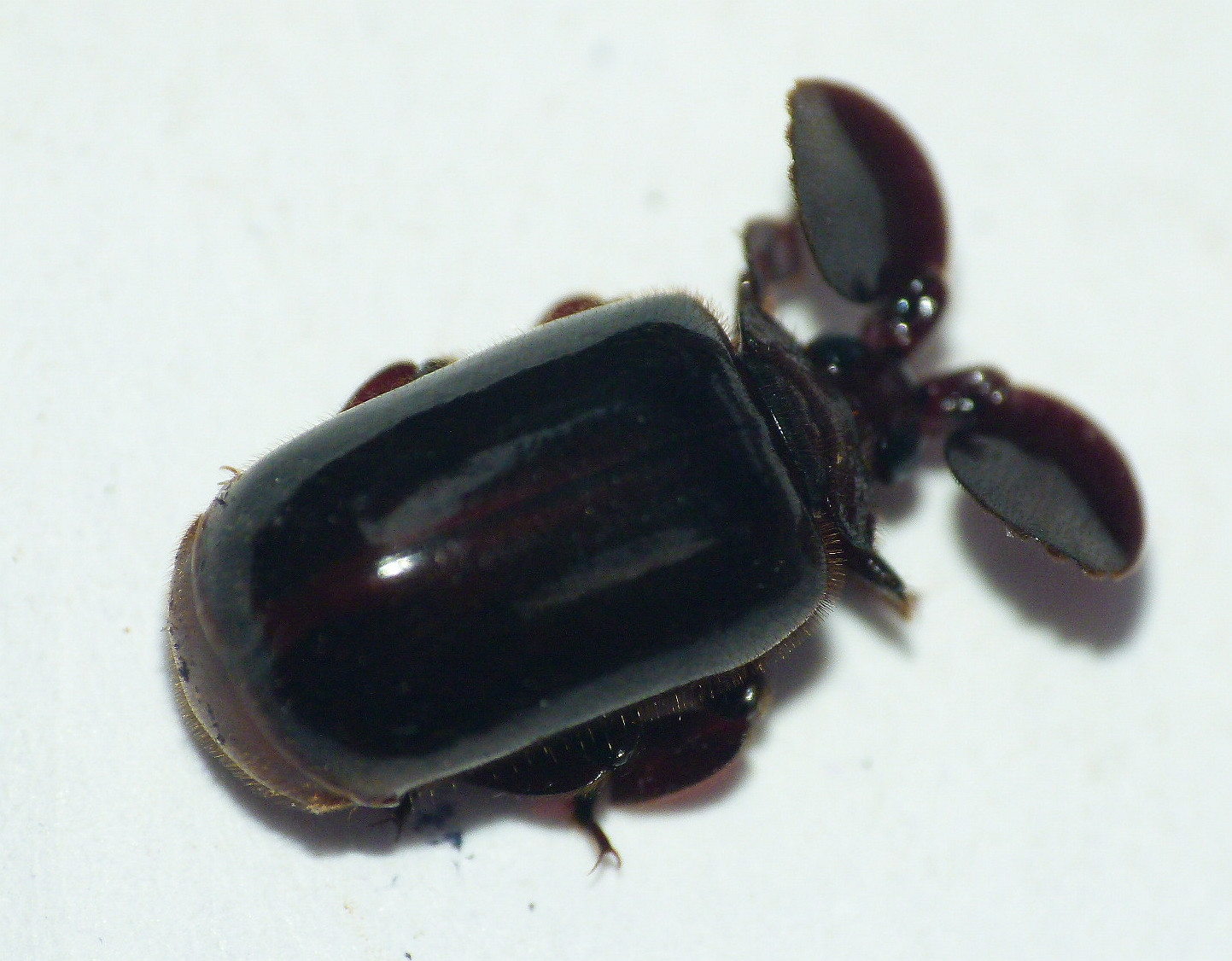
A live specimen

The larvae have been found in the nests of Carebara diversus (formerly Pheidologeton diversus). The adults have a stridulatory organ of the thorax–femur involving the movement of the mesofemur (scraper) against the metasternum (file). They use the vibrations to communicate with ants and possibly for mate recognition and courtship. The larvae have a disc at the caudal end that is bent over the head and thought to be involved in communication with ants.

Males are slightly smaller and the elytra covers more of the abdomen. They can be separated from the similar looking Platyrhopalopsis picteti by the angular side to the pronotum, which is rounded in picteti. The margin of the antennal club is more rounded, lacking any sign of notches, and the edge is fringed with fine hairs. They can produce an explosive blast of hot quinones like other flanged bombardier beetles, but this defense is never used against ants.
