= Jade Castro =

Filipino film director, screenwriter, and producer

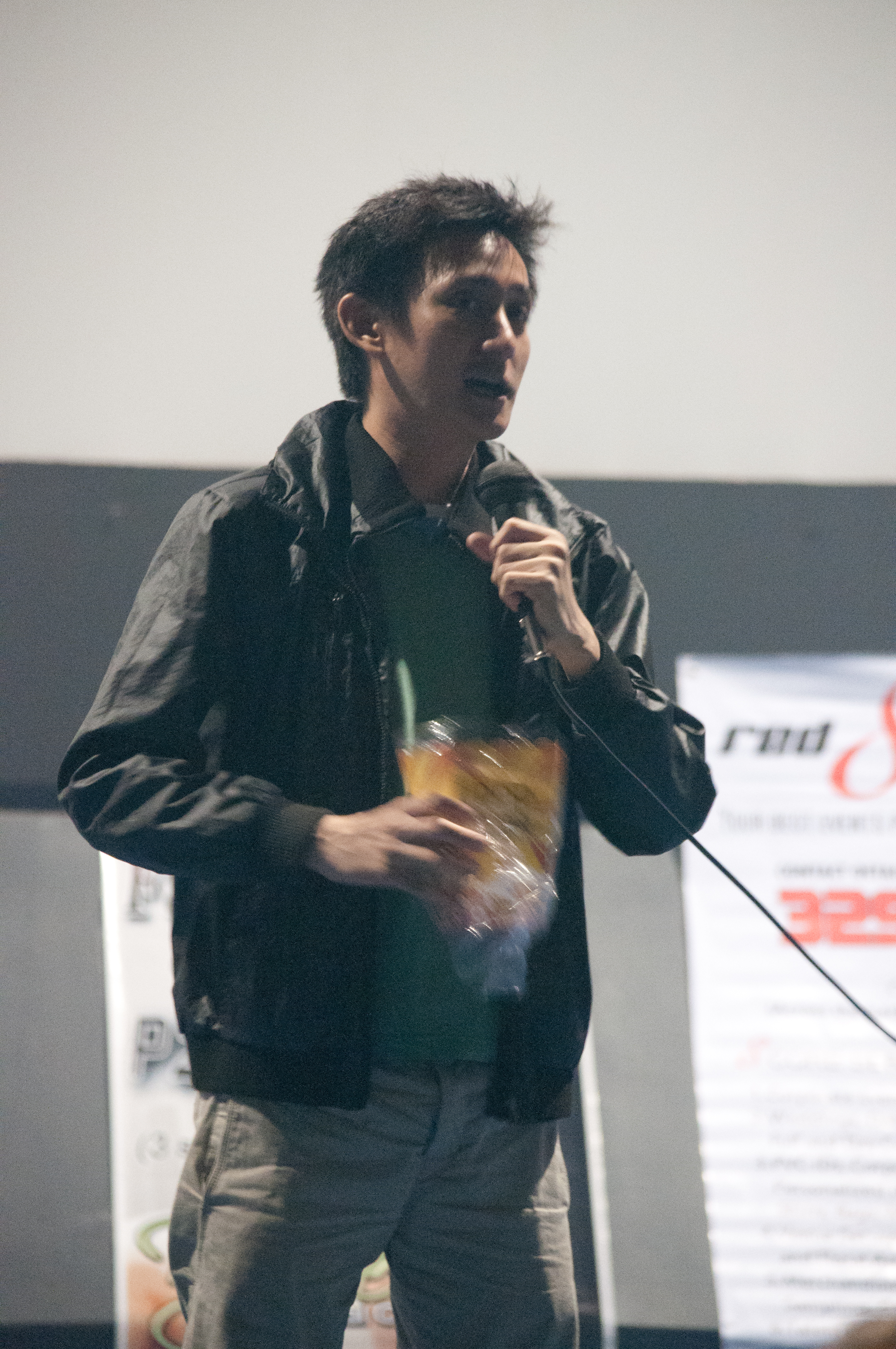
- Castro on August 20, 2011
- Born: Jade Francis Castro; August 21, 1978 (age 48)
- Education: University of the Philippines (B.A.)
- Occupations: Film director; screenwriter; producer
- Notable work: Endo (2007); Zombadings 1: Patayin sa Shokot si Remington (2011)

Jade Francis Castro (born August 21, 1978) is a Filipino film director, screenwriter, and producer. He is best known for writing and directing Endo (2007), and Zombadings 1: Patayin sa Shokot si Remington (2011).

== Early and personal life ==
Jade Castro was born on August 21, 1978. His mother Ruby, whose name takes after the gemstone of the same name, also named him and his brother Jasper after precious rocks: Jade and Jasper. He studied high school at Elizabeth Seton School in Las Piñas, and graduated with a degree in film from the University of the Philippines in 2000.

=== Legal issue ===
In February 2024, Castro and three other individuals were arrested and charged for destructive arson in Catanauan, Quezon. Prosecutors said Castro and his companions set an e-jeepney on fire, citing Castro's social media posts opposing the Public Utility Vehicle Modernization Program as a motive. Castro and company maintained they were vacationing in Mulanay, Quezon at the time the alleged crime took place.

Senator Risa Hontiveros called for a probe of the local police's handling of the incident, citing statements of local official from Mulanay who testified they saw the four suspects in their town at the time of the incident. Congressman Bonifacio Bosita, a former police officer, said the arrest was illegal because he found procedural lapses by the police.

On March 11, Castro and his companions were released from prison after a judge in Catanauan dismissed the case against them due to lack of jurisdiction and the invalidity of their arrest. In a 16-page order, Catanauan Regional Trial Court, Branch 96 Presiding Judge Julius Francis Galvez granted counsel for all the accused Chel Diokno's Motion to quash under Rule 117 of the Revised Rule of Criminal Procedure. “[T]he motion(s) to Quash the Information… is partially granted, and the said Information is hereby quashed, on the ground of lack of jurisdiction of this Court over the persons of accused Castro, Ernesto Orcine, Noel Mariano, and Dominic Ramos as members of the Catanauan Municipal Police Station arrested them not in accordance with Section 5(b), Rule 113 of the Rules of Court” it ordered. Castro, Ernesto, 50, of Bacoor City, Cavite, Noel, 54, civil engineer, from Binangonan, Rizal, and Dominic, 28, also a civil engineer, of Cabiao, Nueva Ecija – had been incarcerated for almost 40 days in Catanauan Bureau of Jail Management and Penology.

== Career ==
Castro began his career as a script researcher for ABS-CBN, where he also served as second unit director in the network's soap opera television series Mula sa Puso (1999). He worked as a script supervisor for director Uro de la Cruz. Castro's directorial debut was the short film titled Hopya Love Me Too. He was reportedly involved in the production of the film Ang Pagdadalaga ni Maximo Oliveros (2005). Castro wrote the screenplays for comedy films D' Anothers (2005) and First Day High (2006). He made his breakthrough success with Endo (2007), a romantic independent film starring Jason Abalos and Ina Feleo. The film—which he wrote, directed and produced—won the Jury Prize at the 3rd Cinemalaya Independent Film Festival, and Best Screenplay at the 2007 Gawad Urian. Castro's direction of the romantic comedy My Big Love (2008) marked his transition to mainstream Philippine cinema. He co-wrote the screenplay with Raymond Lee and Michiko Yamamoto, and directed Zombadings 1: Patayin sa Shokot si Remington (2011), a gay-themed zombie comedy horror film starring Martin Escudero. Castro went on to direct My Kontrabida Girl (2012), Juana C. The Movie and My Lady Boss (2013), another gay-themed TV series Beki Boxer (2014), and LSS (Last Song Syndrome) (2019), a musically driven film starring Gabbi Garcia, Khalil Ramos and Filipino indie folk/folk pop band Ben&Ben wherein Castro is also responsible for its story and screenplay.

In October 2015, it was announced by director Jerrold Tarog that he and Castro are working on a screenplay of the film adaptation of Arnold Arre's graphic novel The Mythology Class.

== Filmography ==
Key
†	Denotes films that have not yet been released

=== Film ===
Title	Year	Credited as			Notes	Refs.
Title	Year	Director	Producer	Writer	Notes	Refs.
D' Anothers	2005	No	No	Yes	Additional scenes and dialogues	
First Day High	2006	No	No	Yes	Story and screenplay	
Endo	2007	Yes	Yes	Yes		
My Big Love	2008	Yes	No	No		
Zombadings 1: Patayin sa Shokot si Remington	2011	Yes	Executive	Yes	Co-written with Raymond Lee and Michiko Yamamoto	
My Kontrabida Girl	2012	Yes	No	Yes		
Juana C. The Movie	2013	Yes	No	No		
My Lady Boss	2013	Yes	No	No		
LSS (Last Song Syndrome)	2019	Yes	No	Yes	Story and screenplay	
Rekonek	2025	Yes	No	No		
Edjop†	2026	No	No	Yes	Co-written with Katski Flores	

=== Television ===
Year	Title	Role	Notes	Ref.
2014	Beki Boxer	Director	Co-directed with Monti L. Parungao	
2014	Wattpad Presents	Director	6 episodes: "Fake Fiancé"	
2015	Mac & Chiz	Director		
2018	Doors	Director and writer	Episode 8 & 10	
2020	Boys' Lockdown	Director	Mini series	
2021	Still	Co-director, Second Unit Director		
2025	All The Things I Leave You	Director		
2026	Love, Siargao	Director		

== Awards and nominations ==
Film	Award	Date of Ceremony	Category	Outcome	Note	Ref.
Endo	Young Critics Circle	August 11, 2008	Best Screenplay	Won	Shared with Raymond Lee and Michiko Yamamoto	
Endo	Gawad Urian	October 1, 2008	Best Screenplay	Won	Shared with Raymond Lee and Michiko Yamamoto	
LSS (Last Song Syndrome)	Pista ng Pelikulang Pilipino	September 15, 2019	Best Director	Nominated		
