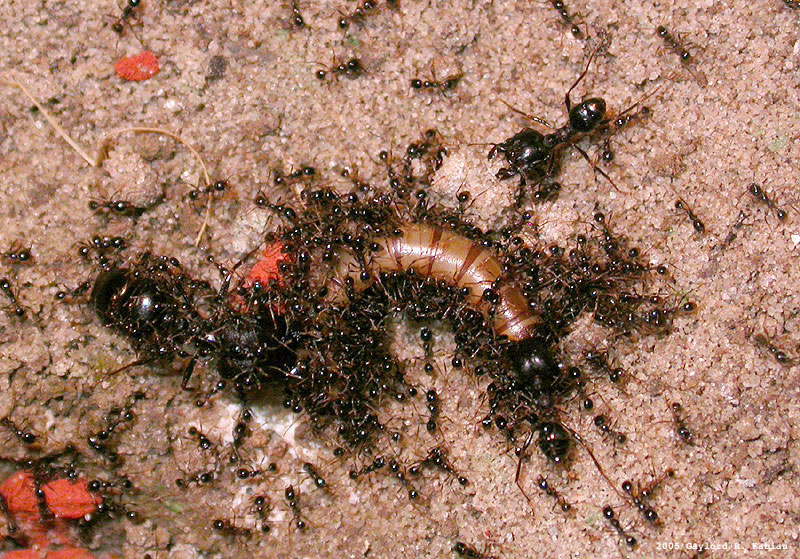
- Carebara diversa attacking a mealworm

Scientific classification
- Kingdom: Animalia
- Phylum: Arthropoda
- Clade: Pancrustacea
- Class: Insecta
- Order: Hymenoptera
- Family: Formicidae
- Subfamily: Myrmicinae
- Genus: Carebara
- Species: C. diversa

Binomial name
- Carebara diversa (Jerdon, 1851)

Synonyms
- Ocodoma diversa; Pheidoloegeton diversus; Myrmica polita Smith, F. 1860, 1860; Pheidole megacephala Smith, F., 1860; Pheidole megacephalotes Dalla Torre, 1892; Pheidole militaris Smith, F., 1860; Pheidole ocellifera Smith, F., 1858; Pheidole pabulator Smith, F., 1860

= Carebara diversa =

Species of ant

Carebara diversa, commonly known as the East Indian harvesting ant, is a species of marauder ant widely distributed throughout Asia.

== Description ==
Carebara diversa is a eusocial insect and individuals have continuous allometric variation in size and morphology to facilitate task allocation and partitioning of work. Minor workers are between 1.3 and 2.5 mm in length, but major workers are much larger. Between the smallest minor and largest major workers there are many intermediate forms. The largest workers can have heads approximately 12 times as large as those of their smallest counterparts. The dry weight of a large major worker can be approximately 550 times as heavy of that of its smallest counterpart. These size-related morphological differences correspond with their division of labor. For example, small, young, minor workers specialize in caring for the larvae but extend their activities as they grow older.

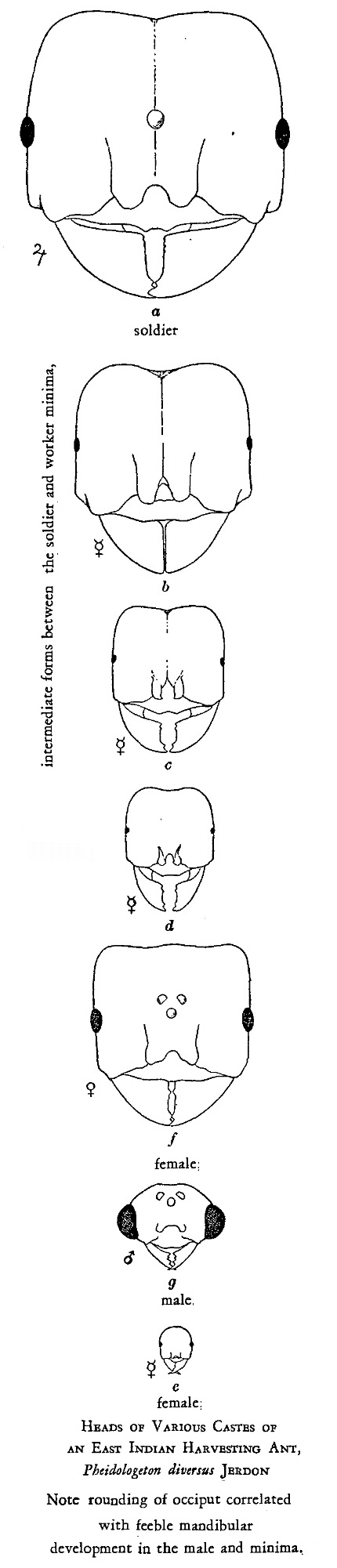
Allometric variation of the East Indian Harvesting Ant

Minor workers have yellowish brown to reddish brown bodies. Their mandibles each have five "teeth" and their antennal scapes are short and do not exceed the posterior margin of the head. Minor workers have rectangular heads with weakly convex posterior margins in full face view

Major workers have reddish brown to blackish brown bodies. Their heads are proportionately larger and almost square with convex posterior margin in frontal view. Mandibles of major workers are large and triangular, with an acute apical "tooth". Their masticatory margins lack distinct "teeth". Their eyes are relatively small and their antennal scapes are half as long as their heads.

== Behavior ==
Carebara diversa forms large colonies which are often found in soil or under rocks. This species preys on small animals such as insects and also collects nectivorous materials. These ants regularly form long columns for foraging and sometimes roof these trails with arcades constructed of soil particles. They use pheromone trails to maintain these lines and if these trails are obstructed it causes chaos and crowding. One study showed that 94% of individuals failed to cross an obstacle in the foraging path and that eventually the column creates a detour around such obstructions. The minors of this species are often observed to be 'hitching a ride' on the large majors so as to save energy while moving along the trail.

=== Differences between Carebara species and real army ants ===
Due to their raids, Carebara species are often compared to army ants, but there are some important differences:

- Carebara species have permanent nests, while real army ants have only temporary nests (Dorylus) or form a bivouac with their own bodies (Eciton).
- Colonies of real army ants have only one queen, so when she dies, the workers may try to join another colony, or the rest of the colony also dies; Carebara colonies can have many (up to 16) queens.
- Carebara species perform a nuptial flight; real army-ant queens have no wings (queens and workers of the Dorylus species are even blind) and mate on soil.
- In Carebara species, a new colony is established by a young queen; real army ants establish a new colony by splitting a large colony.
- Carebara species not only hunt insects, but also eat fruits and grains.

== Range ==
Carebara diversa is widely distributed from India through Southeast Asia to Taiwan and the Philippines. Field records of it occurring in Japan are limited although it has been found on two very southern points: Okinawa Island and on Chicchi-jima Island. Specimens taken at the Camp Zama U.S. Air Force base in Kanagawa Prefecture are believed to have originated from commercial introduction from Southeast Asia.

== Subspecies ==
- Carebara diversa draco Santschi, 1920 - China
- Carebara diversa ficta Forel, 1911 - China
- Carebara diversa laotina Santschi, 1920 - Laos, China
- Carebara diversa macgregori Wheeler, W.M., 1929 - Philippines
- Carebara diversa philippina Wheeler, W.M., 1929 - Philippines
- Carebara diversa standfussi Forel, 1911 - Guinea
- Carebara diversa taprobanae Smith, F., 1858 - Sri Lanka
- Carebara diversa tenuirugosa Wheeler, W.M., 1929 - Philippines
- Carebara diversa williamsi Wheeler, W.M., 1929 - Philippines

== Keeping in a formicarium ==
Regarded as "pseudo-army-ants", Carebara diversa and Carebara affinis are popular pets, but they are said to be very sensitive and difficult to keep; even some experienced antkeepers have lost their colonies just after a few months. One antkeeper who goes by the YouTube name AntsCanada (real name Mikey Bustos), however, has managed to successfully keep a thriving colony of this species, among the other colonies of ants in his collection.
In comparison, it seems not possible to keep real army ants in a formicarium (ant farm) for a longer time because of their nomadic lifestyle, the continuous growth of the colony, and the immense need of food (some army-ant species are also highly selective when it comes to food). In trials performed by zoos and museums, the army-ant colonies died within weeks or months.

== See also ==
- List of ants of India
