= My Lady Boss =

- Theatrical release poster
- Directed by: Jade Castro
- Screenplay by: Aloy Adlawan
- Story by: Annette Gozon-Abrogar
- Produced by: Jose Mari Abacan; Roselle Monteverde; Annette Gozon-Abrogar; Lily Monteverde
- Starring: Richard Gutierrez; Marian Rivera
- Cinematography: Jay Abello
- Edited by: Vanessa de Leon
- Music by: Pearlsha Abubakar
- Production companies: Regal Films; GMA Pictures
- Distributed by: GMA Pictures; Regal Films
- Release date: July 3, 2013
- Running time: 146 minutes
- Country: Philippines
- Languages: Filipino; English
- Box office: ₱18.4 million

My Lady Boss is a 2013 Filipino romantic comedy film directed by Jade Castro, and starring Richard Gutierrez and Marian Rivera. It is produced by GMA Pictures together with Regal Films. The film was supposed to have premiered on April 8, 2013, but after a series of postponed showings, it was released nationwide on July 3, 2013.

== Plot ==
Zach (Gutierrez) is a rich boy forced to find and keep a job after a major blunder in a company he set up. He ends up working for Evelyn, whom he discovers to be the boss from hell. In the long run, he sees her for who and what she really is. Meanwhile, Evelyn (Rivera) is an uptight and tough Brand Manager who hires an assistant Brand Manager. When she finds herself dumped by her boyfriend, Evelyn seeks comfort in Zach, her assistant who shows a different side of him. As they get to know each other more and as their encounters become more intimate, they begin to ask themselves if what they feel for each other is for real. The problem is romance between boss and subordinate in a company is not allowed. Things get complicated when an office romance develops between the unlikely pair.

== Cast ==
- Marian Rivera as Evelyn "EVL" Vallejo Lontoc
- Richard Gutierrez as Zach Rhys Strella
- Rocco Nacino as Henry "HPE" Posadas Enrile
- Tom Rodriguez as Timothy "Tim" Espalto
- Sandy Andolong as Myrna Lontoc
- Sef Cadayona as Nonoy
- Ronaldo Valdez as Carlos Strella
- Matet De Leon as Ruby
- Jace Flores as Leo
- Ruru Madrid as Elvin Lontoc
- Betong Sumaya as Sponky
- Dion Ignacio as Eugene Lontoc
- Kathleen Hermosa as Edna Lontoc
- Patricia Ysmael as Aya
- Jackielou Blanco as Diana
- Pinky Amador as Liza
- Regine Tolentino as Lydia
- Andrea Torres as Ana Soriano-Espalto
- Mikey Bustos as Norman
- Chloe McCully as Chancy
- Benjie Paras as Rammy
- Victor Aliwalas as Jay
- Gerard Pizzaras as Andres
- Petra Mahalimuyak as Kai
- Maricel Laxa as Lorna "LOV" Ongpauco-Villega

== Background and development ==
The film was first announced by the lead actress, Marian Rivera on December 3, 2012, during an interview with Philippine Entertainment Portal. It is going to be the second film which stars Rivera and actor Richard Gutierrez together following the My Best Friend's Girlfriend produced by the same film outfit in 2008. On a set visit by Samantha Portillo of GMA Network, Gutierrez states that "..after 5 years, finally, we get to do a movie", while Rivera says that her working relationship with Richard is better than ever. On an interview on The Philippine Star, Gutierrez talked about the film saying "..It's entertaining and light. It feels good doing a movie of this type again. I was looking forward to this movie after Seduction. We enjoy doing the movie. Although the acting is serious, it is lighter." He further added that the film, though still a romantic-comedy, is more mature than BFGF(My Besftriend's Girlfriend).

Originally, it is slated for February 13, 2013, film date but was pushed back because of scheduling issues. According to an article published by "Filipinas in Showbiz", the film is very much alike with Hollywood film, The Proposal(2009) produced by Mandeville Films. An assumption which proved to be inaccurate because the story of My Lady Boss is not similar to the Proposal, other than the leading actress is the boss of the leading actor. The Proposal is a film about a Canadian lady Executive working in the United States who is forced to pretend to be engaged to her American assistant so that she will not be deported back to Canada. My Lady Boss, on the other hand is about a failed young businessman who is forced to seek employment to get back to the good graces of his disappointed rich grandfather. In January 2013, two short teasers were shown on television, but it was removed on-air after its playdate pushback. The full trailer was first released on the #PPSummerShake episode of Sunday variety show, Party Pilipinas. The theme song for the movie is a new rendition by Aicelle Santos and Gian Magdangal to "I'll Never Go" originally sung by Nexxus. An acoustic version by Rita Iringan and a band version by Kristofer Martin will also be used on the film.

=== Filming ===
The film is set on various locations in the Philippines, with majority of sets in Fairlane, West Fairview, Quezon City.

=== Release and box office status ===
The film was originally slated for a February 14, 2013, release date but it was postponed to April 10, 2013, because production failed to finish shooting the movie on time. But GMA Films moved it again because it would conflict with several Hollywood Summer Blockbuster releases. The movie was finally shown on July 3, 2013.

The film grossed P19.45 million after its two weeks of showing.
