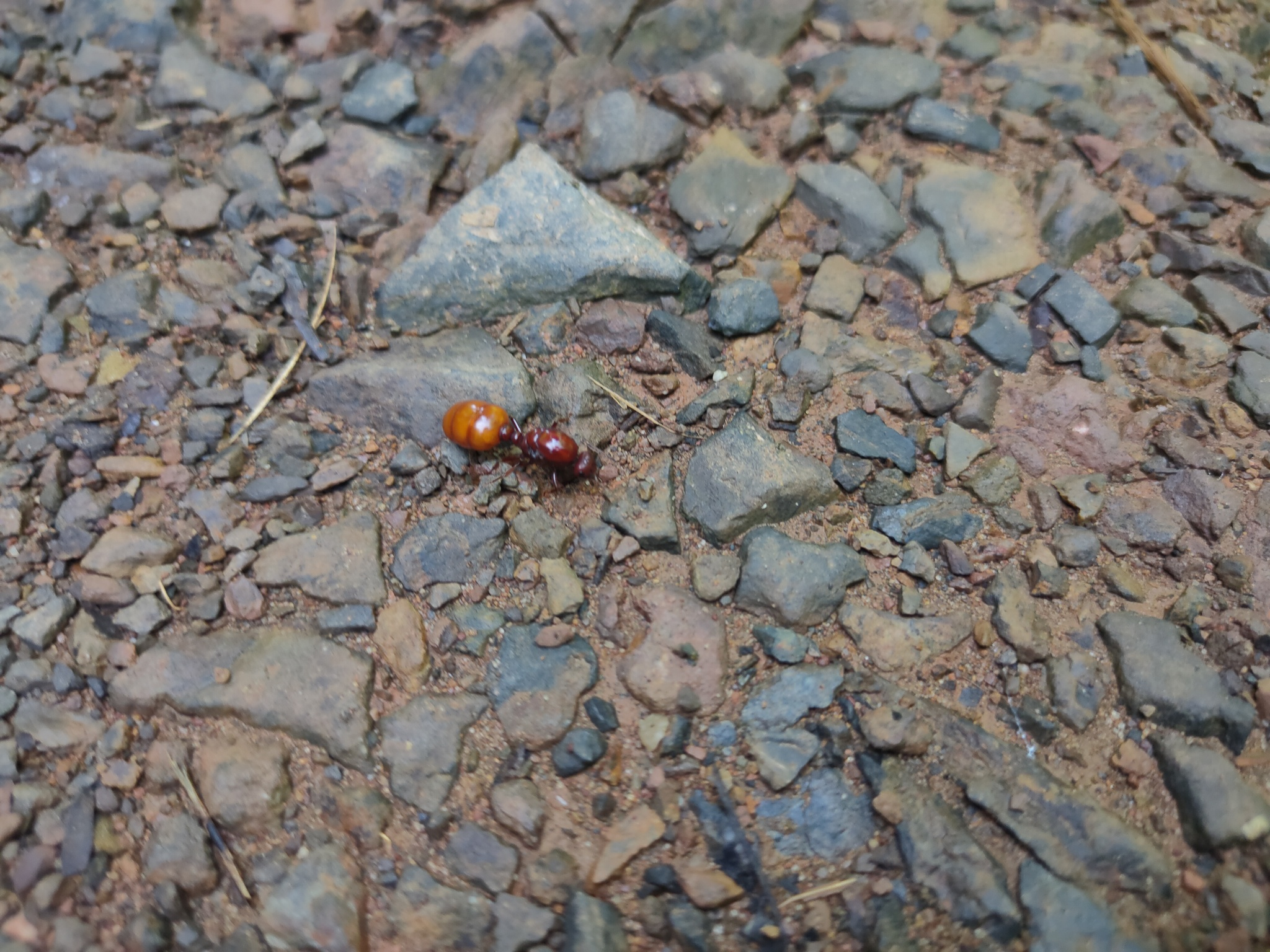

Scientific classification
- Kingdom: Animalia
- Phylum: Arthropoda
- Clade: Pancrustacea
- Class: Insecta
- Order: Hymenoptera
- Family: Formicidae
- Subfamily: Myrmicinae
- Genus: Carebara
- Species: C. castanea

Binomial name
- Carebara castanea (Smith, 1858)

= Carebara castanea =

Species of ant

Carebara castanea is a species of ant from the Myrmicinae subfamily. The scientific name of this species was first published in 1858 by Smith. It is found in Thailand, Laos, and China.

Carebara castanea is consumed by humans in northern Thailand. It is locally known as maeng man (แมงมัน), or subterranean ant.
