= Remington and the Curse of the Zombadings =

2011 independent horror comedy film by Jade Castro

- Release poster
- Filipino: Zombadings 1: Patayin Sa Shokot Si Remington
- Directed by: Jade Castro
- Written by: Raymond Lee (Moira Lang); Jade Castro; Michiko Yamamoto
- Produced by: Raymond Lee
- Starring: Martin Escudero
- Cinematography: Ike Avellana
- Edited by: Lawrence Ang; J.D. Domingo
- Music by: Teresa Barrozo
- Production company: Origin8Media
- Distributed by: Ariztical Entertainment
- Release date: July 2011 (Cinemalaya)
- Running time: 96 minutes
- Country: Philippines
- Languages: Filipino; Tagalog

Remington and the Curse of the Zombadings (Filipino: Zombadings 1: Patayin sa Shokot si Remington) is a 2011 Filipino independent horror comedy film directed by Jade Castro and starring Martin Escudero. Castro co-wrote the screenplay with Raymond Lee and Michiko Yamamoto. It was the highest-grossing Filipino independent film of 2011.

== Plot ==
Young Remington (Andre Salazar) has a habit of spotting gay men and loudly calling them "Bakla!" (a Filipino term for "gay"). Everything changes during a trip to the cemetery, however, where he briefly encounters a grieving drag queen named Pops (Roderick Paulate) and taunts him for his sexuality. Infuriated, Pops swears that Remington would grow up to become gay on his 21st birthday, scaring the young boy.

Many years later, an epidemic of murders of gay men erupts in the little town of Lucban, which Remington's mother, Fe (Janice de Belen), a policewoman, and her co-policewoman Mimi (Angelica Kanapi) are unable to solve. Twenty-year old Remington (Martin Escudero) takes a peek at one such crime scene along with curious passersby in the nearest field when he chances upon a young woman named Hannah Montano (Lauren Young), who recently returned to her hometown, and tries getting to know her, only for her to shun his advances after learning who he is through his best friend Jigs (Kerbie Zamora).

During a street basketball game with their friends, Remington notices a mysterious flying aura in the shape of a pink scarf (a manifestation of the curse) taunting his surroundings, which briefly distracted him until a basketball hits him. In an attempt to court Hannah further, Remington volunteers himself and Jigs to help paint her newly furnished house, only for her to spurn him further after revealing that he was the same little boy who once mocked her late father for being gay, earning him the ire of her grieving mother, Mrs. Montano (Eugene Domingo).

That very same night, Remington dreamt of himself and Jigs taking a bath outside their home, only to be attacked by a buffed man wielding a razor, with a butterfly tattoo on his chest. He wakes up with cuts on his legs, having lost all his body hair. His father, Ed (John Regala), notices his new look during a drinking session with his homophobic friends Suarez (Daniel Fernando) and Serge (Leandro Baldemor) and proudly declares his son as a "real man" who is off to court women.

Meanwhile, as the murders in the barrio continue to persist, Remington tells his mother about his dream and tries helping her by identifying available suspects. Concerned, his mother asks if he might be closeted gay, to which Remington adamantly denies. His mother berates him for not wanting to go to Manila for college and asks what he truly wants in his life, to which he doesn't reply.

Later that night, as another gay man gets murdered inside a beauty parlor, Remington dreamt of mistakenly boarding a tricycle thought to be Jigs', only to discover that the driver was the same strange man who attacked him in his first dream. He is instead brought to a secluded spot in the middle of the forest, where the same man paddles him and has his tongue pulled out. Eventually, Remington "wakes up" from this dream, only to discover that he can now speak "gay" and realizes that the curse from his childhood is starting to come true. Despite trying his best to hide his sexuality, however, his newfound behavior has changed Hannah and her mother's perception of him, and Hannah eventually falls for the new Remington.

As the curse continues to intensify, Remington notices that his mannerisms are becoming increasingly feminine, and his wardrobe preferences are shifting. At the same time, he starts falling for his best friend Jigs, who eventually tries to seduce him but refuses to continue after learning that most of the gay men he had affairs with were murdered. Remington realizes how he is starting to lose himself and starts consulting his gay helper, Georgia (Nar Cabico), on what to do.

After briefly consulting an albularyo (Marian Rivera), Remington, Hannah, and Jigs track down Pops, the mysterious drag queen who cursed him during his youth, and discover his mansion. The aged Pops initially denied putting a curse on Remington and attempted to have his pager boy shoo the trio away until Remington sees a portrait of the gay man in his house and starts calling Pops "Bakla!" to make him remember. Furious, Pops calls him out and confirms that he did put the curse on him, but unfortunately, he has no idea how to undo it. He, however, helps conduct a seance with the trio to communicate with the mysterious men who haunt Remington's dreams. The mysterious men manifest before them and reveal a clear solution: the only way for him to remove the curse is to find a purely heterosexual man who will choose to become gay in his place.

Just as the trio, Pops and his pager boy set off to town and find possible replacements, they find themselves being blocked by the culprit of the murders: Remington's godfather, Suarez, whose "gaydar" gun led him to them and kills Pops. As the trio runs away from the scene, the distraught pager boy brings back his beloved master from the dead, along with the souls of other drag queens who have been murdered to exact justice, in the form of zombies, which flock to town and promptly start attacking citizens.

With the time ticking, Remington, Hannah and Jigs make it to the former's birthday party, where they ask the rest of their friends if they are willing to take the curse in his place. None of them agree, in which Remington reluctantly agrees on staying that way, until Hannah snaps him out of it and retorts that real gay men continue to fight oppression due to the stigma, and that she knows he is not like this, so he doesn't have to give up being who he originally was.

As the rest of the town is being attacked by gay zombies (aptly called “zombadings”, or “gay zombies”), Remington eventually meets his father, who protects him by stepping between him and Suarez. Just as Suarez is about to fire his gun, the gaydar fails, with Remington's father proudly declaring that his son is not gay, contrary to what Suarez thinks. During the ruckus, however, Serge gets attacked by zombies and dies from his injuries, prompting Suarez to cradle his cohort's body as he mourns his death. Having sensed Suarez's brief moment of affection, the gesture reactivates the gaydar gun and fires at Suarez, ending his life.

Minutes before the curse takes over, Remington desperately explains to his skeptical father the nature of the curse and his current predicament. The latter asks what his son needs to undo it, and reluctantly but willingly agrees to become gay in his son's place, turning his son back to normal right before midnight.

Life returns to normal in Lucban. Remington is set on leaving the town to continue his studies in Manila. Hannah, however, has finally set up the dorm she had dreamed of creating as her business. Serge and Suarez are buried under the same gravesite, while Pops and the rest of the "zombadings" set up a hat shop in an undisclosed park. Remington's father, however, lives a normal but pleasant life, now as an openly gay father, who also settles on eyeing passing men with his wife, and one of the men has the husband and wife agree in sync.

Meanwhile, somewhere in Lucban, another tricycle stops in the middle of the street and unloads a gay man. A passing boy loudly tells his mother that he sees a gay man, which initially offends the latter, only for the kid to add that the gay man is beautiful as they part, and the film zooms out of Lucban.

In the closing credits, a Bollywood-style production number in the street ensues with Remington's now-gay father (John Regala) as star attraction.

== Cast ==
- Martin Escudero as Remington
- Lauren Young as Hannah
- Kerbie Zamora as Jigs
- John Regala as Ed, Remington's father
- Janice De Belen as Fe, Remington's mother
- Roderick Paulate as Pops Ricafuerte
- Leandro Baldemor as Serge
- Daniel Fernando as Suarez
- John Estrada as man in last scene

== Release ==
Zombadings 1 was released in Philippine theaters on August 31, 2011, and became a box-office success. It was later made available for streaming on Netflix.

A recorded video capturing celebrity reactions on the night of the film’s premiere at the CCP was documented by film students from Batch 5 of the Asia Pacific Film Institute, under the mentorship of Jade Castro and Moira Lang. Among these budding filmmakers were future cinematic visionaries Emille Joson and Adrian Portugal, who would later rise to prominence as distinguished artists in both the Philippine and international film industries. (2)

== Reception ==
Various reviewers critiqued the movie.

Metacritic, a review aggregator, rated it 56/100 based on four reviews.
