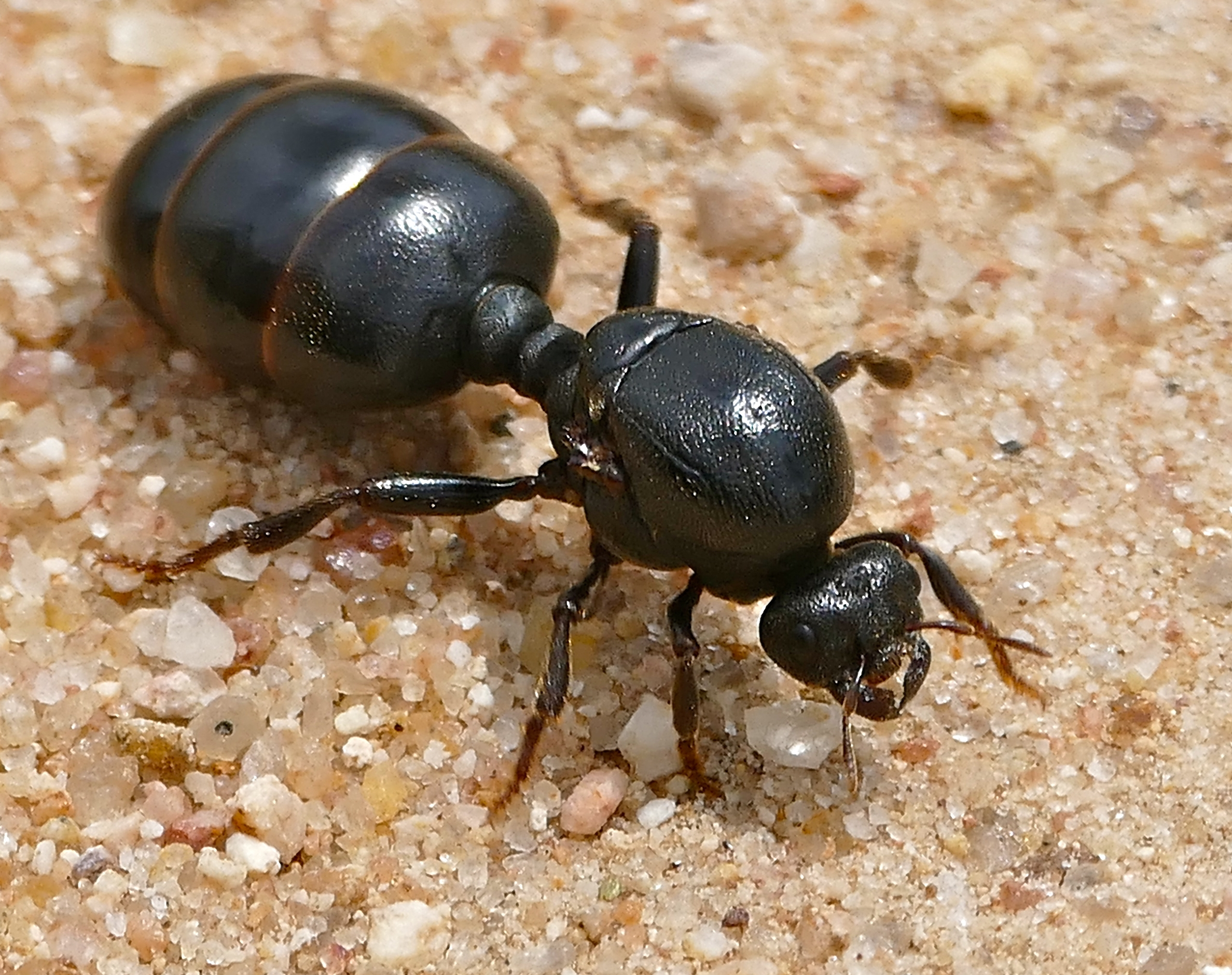
- Carebara vidua, wingless queen

Scientific classification
- Kingdom: Animalia
- Phylum: Arthropoda
- Class: Insecta
- Order: Hymenoptera
- Family: Formicidae
- Subfamily: Myrmicinae
- Genus: Carebara
- Species: C. vidua

Binomial name
- Carebara vidua Smith, 1858

= Carebara vidua =

Species of ant

Carebara vidua is a species of ant in the subfamily Myrmicinae. The species is native to East Africa and is particularly associated with the Lake Victoria region of Kenya. It is traditionally consumed as food and used in ethnomedicine among some local communities. Due to habitat destruction and over-exploitation, it has been described as locally endangered.

== Description ==
Adult female Carebara vidua are relatively large ants, measuring approximately 20–25 mm in length, with a shiny black body and a conspicuously enlarged, rounded abdomen. Females are winged during the reproductive phase. Males are smaller, approximately 10 mm long, winged, and have a paler abdomen. Worker ants are much smaller, typically 3–5 mm in length, wingless, and possess a functional sting. Like other hymenopterans, the species has chewing mouthparts, compound eyes, three ocelli, and segmented antennae.

== Distribution and habitat ==
Carebara vidua occurs in the Lake Victoria basin of western Kenya, including Kisumu and Siaya counties. The species constructs extensive subterranean colonies consisting of interconnected chambers and galleries, often located under soil, rocks, or human structures. Colonies are difficult to detect except during reproductive swarming events.

== Ecology and life cycle ==
The species is omnivorous, feeding on small insects, larvae, worms, plant material, nectar, sugary exudates, and honeydew from aphids and scale insects. Colonies consist of reproductive males and females and a larger number of non-reproductive workers, which are responsible for foraging and nest maintenance.

Reproductive swarming occurs once annually, typically during the long rainy season. Winged males and females emerge from underground nests between late morning and mid-afternoon. After mating, males die shortly thereafter, while fertilized females establish new colonies by excavating shallow chambers in the soil, where eggs hatch within approximately 5–7 days.

== Nutritional value ==
Carebara vidua has been studied for its nutritional composition and is notable for its high protein and fat content. Analyses indicate protein levels ranging from approximately 39.79% to 44.64% and fat content ranging from 42.07% to 49.77%, depending on the body part analyzed. The abdomen contains the highest fat concentration, though all body parts are nutritionally valuable.

The species is also rich in dietary minerals, including iron, zinc, magnesium, potassium, calcium, and phosphorus. Fatty acid profiling shows high levels of palmitic, oleic, and linoleic acids, with no linolenic acid detected. Vitamins present include B-complex vitamins, as well as vitamins A and E, though in lower concentrations than in some other edible insects.

== Human use ==
Among the Luo and Luhya communities of western Kenya, Carebara vidua is traditionally collected and consumed as food and is regarded as having medicinal properties. Elderly community members associate the ant with improved vitality and the management of certain ailments. The ants are typically consumed whole, although some people preferentially eat the abdomen due to its high fat content. The species is rarely sold in markets because of its scarcity and perceived high personal value.

== Conservation ==
Although Carebara vidua has not been formally assessed by the IUCN, research indicates that it is locally endangered in parts of its range. Habitat destruction, agricultural expansion, construction, and unsustainable harvesting have contributed to population declines. Researchers have highlighted the need for habitat protection and further study of the species’ nutritional and potential medicinal value to prevent local extinction.
