= Carebara nana =

Scientific classification
- Kingdom: Animalia
- Phylum: Arthropoda
- Clade: Pancrustacea
- Class: Insecta
- Order: Hymenoptera
- Family: Formicidae
- Subfamily: Myrmicinae
- Genus: Carebara
- Species: C. nana

Binomial name
- Carebara nana (Roger, 1863)

Species of ant

Carebara nana is a species of ant in the subfamily Formicinae, first described in 1863 by Julius Roger as Pheidologeton nanus. It is found in Sri Lanka.
