= Carebara sinhala =

Scientific classification
- Kingdom: Animalia
- Phylum: Arthropoda
- Class: Insecta
- Order: Hymenoptera
- Family: Formicidae
- Subfamily: Myrmicinae
- Genus: Carebara
- Species: C. sinhala

Binomial name
- Carebara sinhala Fischer, Azorsa & Fisher, 2014

Synonyms
- Oligomyrmex taprobanae Forel, 1911

Species of ant

Carebara sinhala is a species of ant in the subfamily Myrmicinae. It is found in Sri Lanka.
