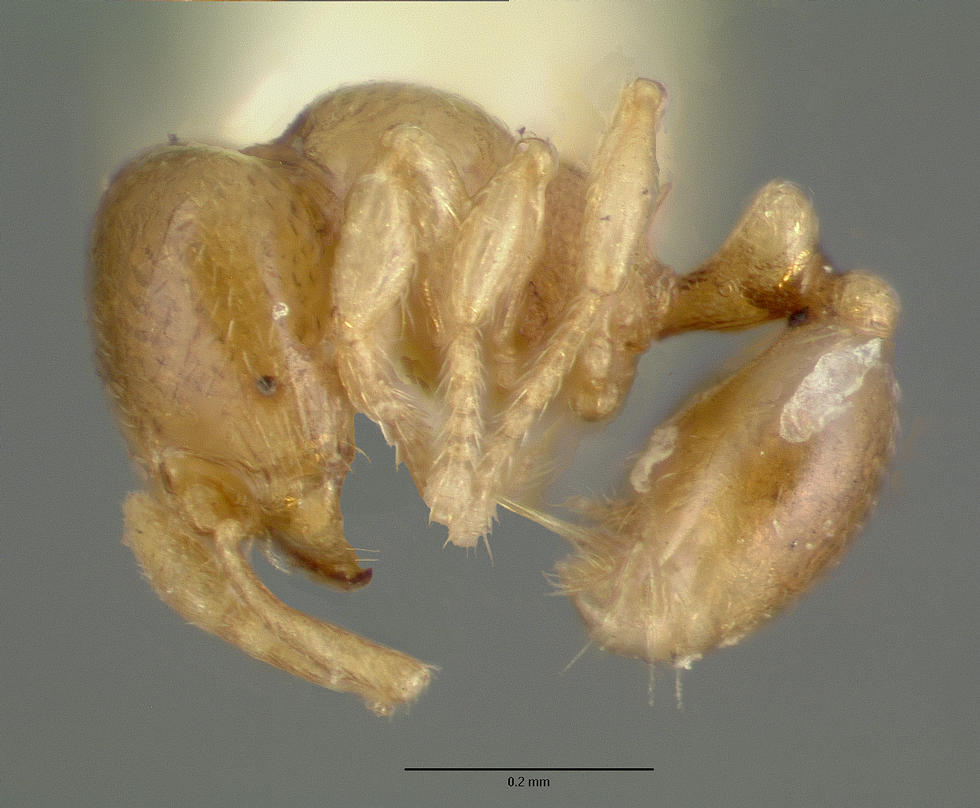
- Carebara armata major worker

Scientific classification
- Kingdom: Animalia
- Phylum: Arthropoda
- Clade: Pancrustacea
- Class: Insecta
- Order: Hymenoptera
- Family: Formicidae
- Subfamily: Myrmicinae
- Genus: Carebara
- Species: C. armata

Binomial name
- Carebara armata (Donisthorpe, 1948)

= Carebara armata =

Species of ant

Carebara armata is a species of ant from the subfamily Myrmicinae. The scientific name of this species was first published in 1948 by Horace Donisthorpe.
