= Carebara pygmaea =

Scientific classification
- Kingdom: Animalia
- Phylum: Arthropoda
- Clade: Pancrustacea
- Class: Insecta
- Order: Hymenoptera
- Family: Formicidae
- Subfamily: Myrmicinae
- Genus: Carebara
- Species: C. pygmaea

Binomial name
- Carebara pygmaea (Emery, 1887)

Synonyms
- Pheidologeton pygmaeus albipes Emery, 1893; Pheidologeton pygmaeus bugnioni Forel, 1915; Pheidologeton pygmaeus simalurensis Forel, 1915

Species of ant

Carebara pygmaea is a species of ant in the subfamily Formicinae. It is found in Sri Lanka, Borneo, Indonesia, Philippines.

== Subspecies ==
- Carebara pygmaea densistriata Stitz, 1925
- Carebara pygmaea pygmaea Emery, 1887
