= GET COMET =

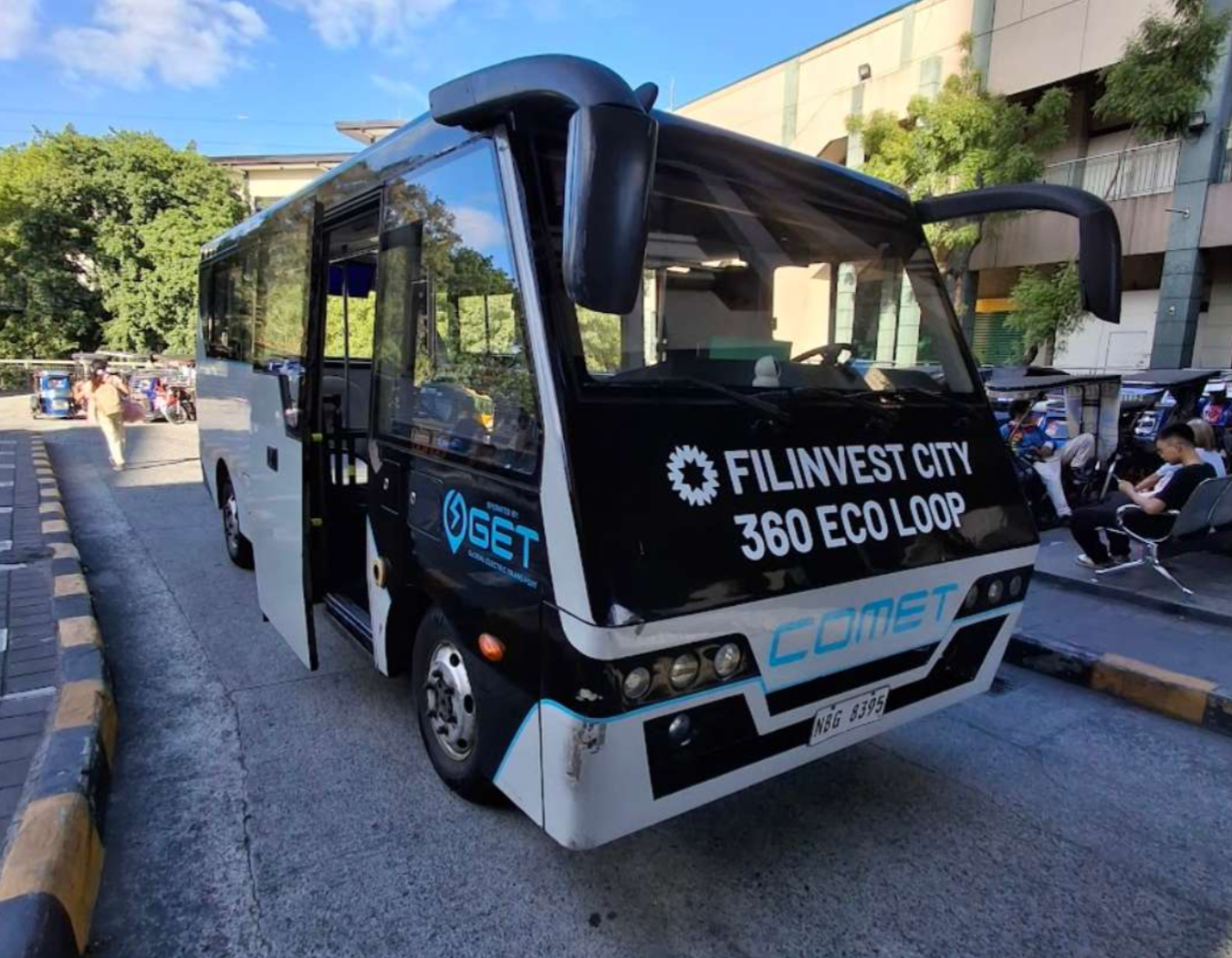

Overview
- Type: Minibus
- Manufacturer: Global Electric Transport, EvDynamics, Yangtse Bus
- Also called: City Optimized Managed Electric Transport
- Assembly: Philippines: Carmona, Cavite (GET Philippines)
- Designer: Pangea Motors

Powertrain
- Battery: Lithium-ion
- Electric range: 100 kilometers (62 mi)

Dimensions
- Length: 6,200 mm (244.1 in)
- Width: 2,150 mm (84.6 in)
- Height: 2,350 mm (92.5 in)

The GET City Optimized Managed Electric Transport (COMET) is an electric minibus developed by American firm Pangea Motors and manufactured and distributed by Global Electric Transport.

== Design ==
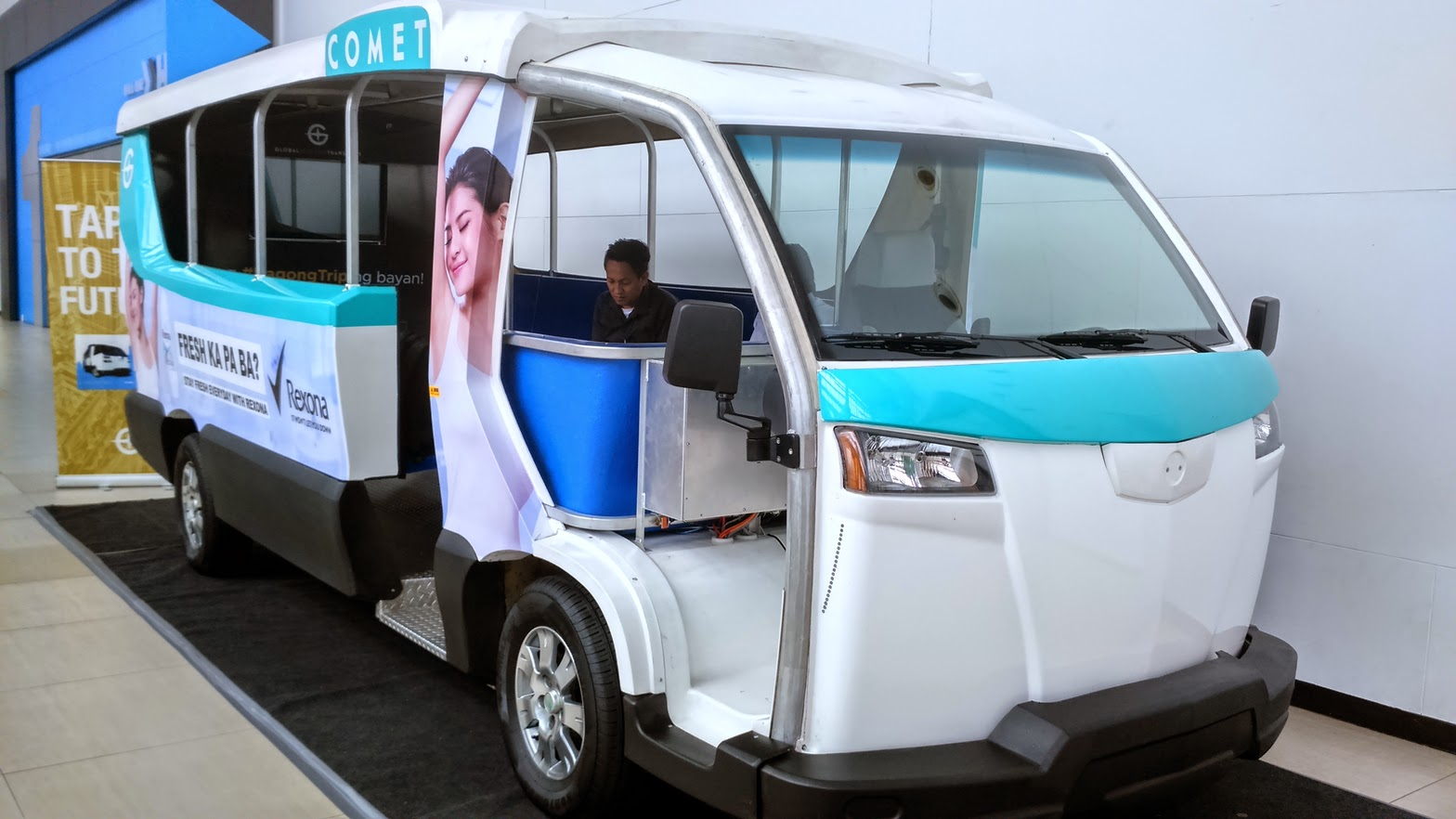
An earlier model at an exhibition in 2014.

Often characterized as an electric jeepney (e-jeep) in the Philippines, the City Optimized Managed Electric Transport (COMET) was designed specifically to fulfill the public transportation needs of Metro Manila, as a potential replacement for traditional open-air jeepneys, which are also noted as a major contributor to air pollution in the metropolis. The COMET was designed by United States-based Pangea Motors and is distributed and manufactured by Global Electric Transport (GET). A team from the United States went to the Philippines as part of the design process for the COMET minibus.

Unlike traditional jeepneys, the COMET has the capability to accommodate standing passengers and its doors are positioned on the sides instead in the back. It is also powered by lithium-ion batteries instead of diesel. GET would also allow COMET owners to customized the exterior of the vehicles similar to the kitschy jeepney art of its conventional counterparts.

== Use in public transport ==
The COMET, is touted as a replacement to traditional jeepneys in the Philippines which plies routes in urban centers. In contrast to traditional jeepneys, where passengers could board and alight at any point in a given route in practice; COMETs were only allowed to do so at certain designated stops. The COMETs' public transport operations are managed by a Command Center, ran by Pangea Philippines which could track individual COMETs using GPS installed on each vehicle. Fares are paid through a dedicated contactless smart card by GET.

The COMET was first used for public transport in Quezon City in September 2014. The vehicle was relaunched on September 3, 2015 with changes made to increase its electrical range and adjustments to its air suspension. In December 2021, operations started in Valenzuela.

The Light Rail Manila Corp. along with GET also opened routes in Metro Manila.

=== Love Bus ===
In September 2025, President Bongbong Marcos relaunched the Love Bus in Valenzuela City, using 5 COMET units.

COMET units under the Love Bus program ply from the Valenzuela Gateway Complex to the Parañaque Integrated Terminal Exchange and vice versa, with free rides offered during rush hours, with an additional route plying up to Batasan and Commonwealth Avenue.

In March 2026, The Love Bus program was announced to be further extended to sections of the C-5 highway in Quezon City, and the Ortigas Center in Pasig, and Mandaluyong, with 10 extra COMET buses.
