= Carebara escherichi =

Scientific classification
- Kingdom: Animalia
- Phylum: Arthropoda
- Clade: Pancrustacea
- Class: Insecta
- Order: Hymenoptera
- Family: Formicidae
- Subfamily: Myrmicinae
- Genus: Carebara
- Species: C. escherichi

Binomial name
- Carebara escherichi (Forel, 1911)

Species of ant

Carebara escherichi is a species of ant in the subfamily Formicinae. It is found in Sri Lanka.
