= Carebara butteli =

Scientific classification
- Kingdom: Animalia
- Phylum: Arthropoda
- Clade: Pancrustacea
- Class: Insecta
- Order: Hymenoptera
- Family: Formicidae
- Subfamily: Myrmicinae
- Genus: Carebara
- Species: C. butteli

Binomial name
- Carebara butteli (Forel, 1913)

Species of ant

Carebara butteli is a species of ant in the subfamily Myrmicinae. It is found in Sri Lanka.
