= Ant-keeping =

Hobby involving the care, and of ants and ant colonies

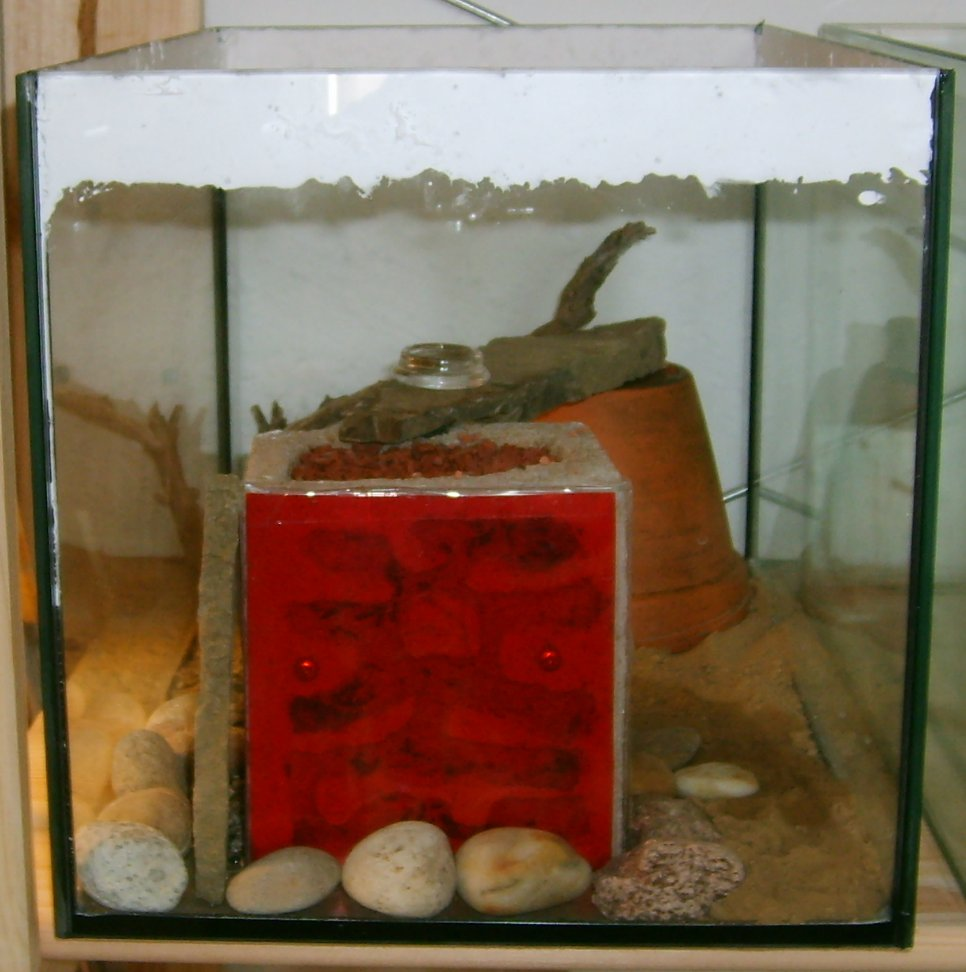
A formicarium, which is a housing for an ant colony. Note the talcum powder/rubbing alcohol lubricant mixture applied around the top perimeter of the enclosure, to prevent ants from escaping.

Ant-keeping (or ant keeping) is a hobby involving the capture, care, and observation of ants and ant colonies. It is a form of lay myrmecology. The trend toward keeping ants as pets has increased significantly over the past decade.

== History ==
Keeping ants as pets has been a common hobby since the mass-marketed Uncle Milton's Ant Farm achieved commercial success in the late 1950s, though these ant farms did not include a queen ant for legal reasons. With the exception of Pogonomyrmex occidentalis, U.S. federal law restricts shipping live queen ants of other species (and other "plant pests") in interstate commerce.

== Reasons for ant-keeping ==
Ant keepers may choose to keep ants in captivity to document ant behavior (in the case of an ant species which is difficult to observe in the wild). This field of study is called myrmecology. Ant keepers may also choose to keep ants as a casual hobby; i.e., as pets. People who keep ants may also keep them for scientific purposes and experiments. Furthermore, ants require less involvement from human keepers to breed, as long as the proper conditions are met, as opposed to other animals.

== Starting a colony ==
There are differing methods of starting, caring for, and housing an ant colony. In the United States queen ants can be bought from vendors provided that the seller meets state and federal requirements, including USDA permits. In the UK and other European countries, most exotic species of ant can be purchased legally through vendors though it depends on local laws.

=== Locating a queen ant ===
The first step involved in ant keeping is capturing or purchasing a fertilized queen ant. Ants engage in nuptial flights during spring, summer, and some species have also been recorded to have their nuptial flights during winter. After these flights a fertilized queen ant will land and remove her wings before locating a spot to found her new colony. Nuptial flights often happen after a heavy rain or a drastic seasonal change. If a queen has already broken off her wings, she is likely (but not certainly) fertilized. If a queen ant on the ground still has her wings, she is likely unfertilized, but still pick it up because it might break her wings later.

A queen ant can be distinguished from an ergate (worker ant) by the relatively larger size of the thorax (which at this point contains the wing muscles of the queen), and the enlarged abdomen which contains eggs. However, certain species have large workers similar in size to a queen; Pheidologeton diversus, for example, possesses several castes of dinergates (soldier ants). If the ant has marks on either side of the thorax (wing scars, where the queen's wings were), it is a queen. If not, it is a supermajor in most cases. In some rare cases, species can have queens without wings at all, like some Myrmecia species. These are called ergatoid queens

=== Housing the queen ant ===
For fully claustral species, the queen should be sealed in a small, dark, aerated container with access to water. One way to provide this environment involves using a test tube setup. This requires a test tube 1/2 filled with bottled water. A cotton ball is placed in the tube so that it reaches the water line. The queen is then placed in the tube and sealed off with another cotton ball. This nesting chamber should be kept in the dark for one month or more depending on the species, for example Camponotus while the queen lays her eggs and tends to them until they hatch. A claustral ant species need not be fed during this period, as a queen ant will digest her now-useless wing muscles to provide her with the necessary energy until her first generation of workers emerges. But feeding a small drop of honey before she starts laying eggs energises the queen ant and reduces the chances of her eating her own eggs.

For a semi-claustral species, which will require food during this nesting phase, protein rich foods should be provided intermittently during the pre-worker phase, with the frequency and type of food determined by the specific species of ant.

=== Moving the ants into a larger housing ===
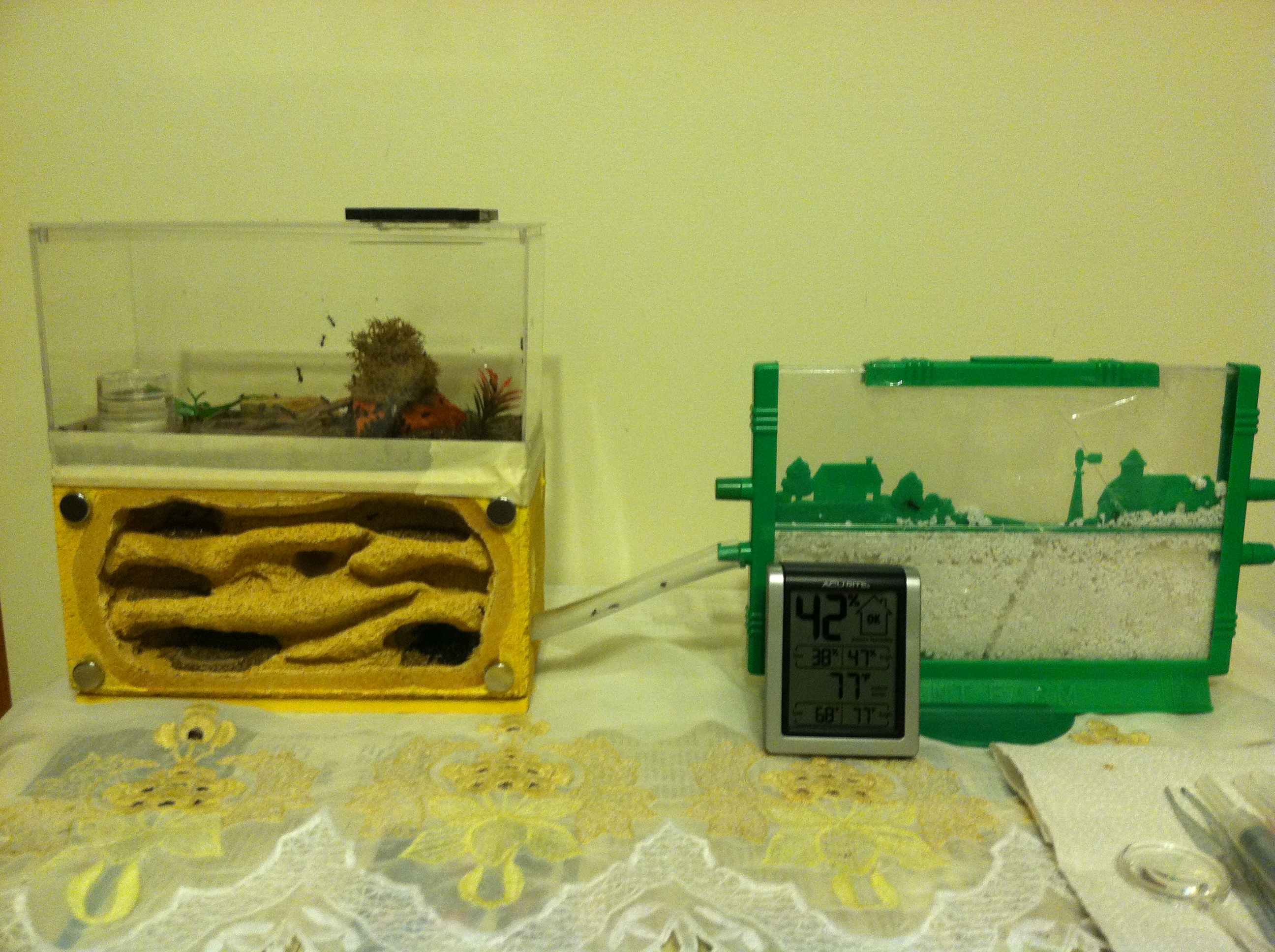
Camponotus nearcticus workers traveling between two formicaria through a connector tube

If successful with feeding the first generation of workers, the queen ant should continue laying eggs. Eventually (at about 50 worker ants), the colony should be moved into a larger housing such as a formicarium to allow continued growth of the colony. If moving ants into a setup before this 'worker limit' is desired, purchasing a 'test tube outworld' allows for easier feeding while keeping the colony inside the test tube.

== Caring for ants ==
=== Dietary needs ===
An ant's diet should consist primarily of sugars/carbohydrates (such as fruit, sugar water, raw honey, or honeydew) and proteins (such as mealworms, cockroaches, or bits of egg). The sugars are necessary to provide the ants with energy, and the proteins are necessary for the growth of the colony. Uneaten food should be removed to prevent the growth of mold in the formicarium.

In some ant species, such as in the Pogonomyrmex genus, seeds are necessary for proper growth. These ants will not accept sugars such as honey, but will accept various seeds including chia seeds. These will provide this species and other harvester ants with all the energy they need for proper development.

=== Environmental needs ===
Besides the obvious need of a formicarium and outworld (a separate container, often decorated to resemble the outside world, in which the ants forage for food), ants require certain conditions to thrive. For one, almost all ants, save for a few twig nesting species, will not survive without a source of humidity in their nest. This can be accomplished in many ways; some nests are made of a naturally absorbent material, such as plaster, some contain a sponge or cotton ball which is watered when need be, and others still contain a reservoir of water which evaporates over time. Most ants also appreciate a heat source; as ants are ectothermic, their colonies develop faster the warmer their nest is. A heating cable is the preferred method of many antkeepers, but heat lamps, heating pads, and un-air conditioned rooms are all worthy alternatives. For some desert dwelling species, such as some ants in the genus Pogonomyrmex and Pheidole heat is even required for proper growth. Many antkeepers keep their ants in a dark area to avoid stressing them, as light would normally indicate a nest breach. However, most species become desensitized to light after being exposed to it frequently. While light-aversion can be a useful tool when moving colonies to new habitats, the benefits of having ants both indifferent to observation and more easily monitored far outweighs this, especially when more effective alternatives, such as physical disturbance to or partial disassembly of the formicarium exist.

== Laws on keeping ants ==
The legality of intentionally shipping reproductive ants (usually a mated queen or whole colony) across state, provincial, or international borders varies substantially by country. In the United States, it is illegal to ship live queen ants across state lines without a license or explicit permission from relevant state or federal entities. A PPQ 526 permit is required to ship ants between states. As of 2019, however, at least one species (Pogonomyrmex occidentalis) is legal to ship within the United States, with the exception of Alaska, California, Florida, and Hawaii. In Europe, some domestic species (such as Formica rufa) are protected, and it is illegal to own, keep, buy, or sell these ants, or to damage their nests. However, unlike for reptiles and spiders, there are no rules for owning, keeping, buying or selling non-protected species inside the EU and many other countries.

== In popular culture ==
Over the years, ant-keeping has become more normalised through the internet.

== See also ==
- Beekeeping
