= Mikey Bustos =

Filipino-Canadian singer and comedian

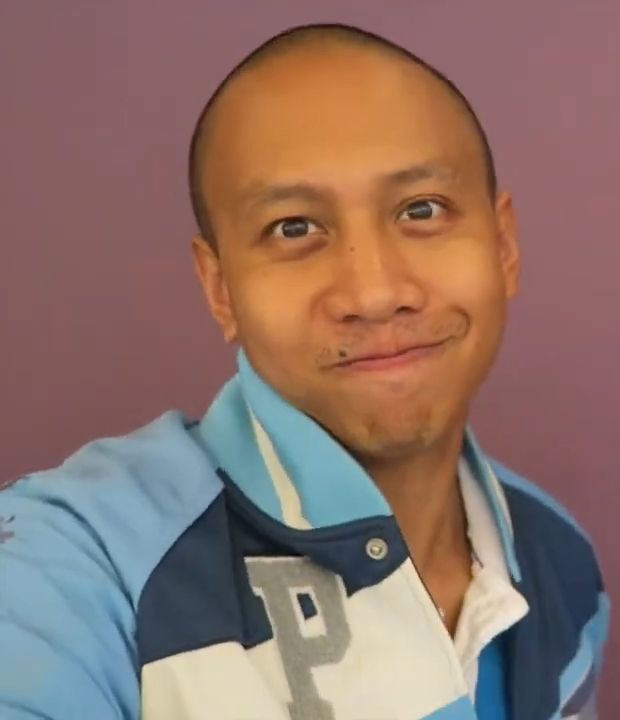
- Bustos in 2017
- Born: Michael John Yadan Tumanguil Pestano Bustos; June 23, 1981 (age 45); Weston, Ontario, Canada
- Education: St. Michael's College School; University of Guelph; Ryerson University
- Occupations: Singer-songwriter; part-time actor; comedian; entrepreneur; antkeeper; vlogger
- Television: CTV (2003); GMA Network (2011-2017)
- Partner: RJ Garcia (2012-present)
- Musical career
- Genres: Pop; R&B
- Instrument: Vocals
- Years active: 2003–present

YouTube information
- Channels: AntsCanada; Mikey Bustos
- Years active: 2009–present
- Genres: Education; music; vlog
- Subscribers: 6.87 million (AntsCanada); 1.41 million (Mikey Bustos)
- Views: 861 million (AntsCanada); 221 million (Mikey Bustos)
- Last updated: 8 March 2026
- Website: mikeybustosvideos.com

Michael John Yadan Tumanguil Pestano Bustos (born June 23, 1981) known professionally as Mikey Bustos, is a Filipino-Canadian YouTuber, vlogger, actor, singer, and comedian who has appeared on the reality television show Canadian Idol. He also runs the YouTube channel AntsCanada, which specializes in ant-keeping.

== Early life ==
Michael John Yadan Tumanguil Pestano Bustos was born on June 23, 1981, in Weston, a neighborhood of Toronto, Ontario. He attended St. Michael's College School in Toronto and worked as a temp at the Bank of Montreal.

== Canadian Idol ==
Bustos placed seventh runner-up in the finals of first season of Canadian Idol in August 2003, despite Chart magazine's prediction: "If we were to lay our bets today, ChartAttack’s money would be on Toronto contestant Mikey Bustos, a slightly strange-looking young man with a shaved head and the voice of an angel."

Bustos recorded with BMG Music Canada and ViK. Recordings for the Canadian Idol compilation album, which was certified gold on the Soundscan Billboard charts on second day of release, and ranked in the Top 5 best selling Canadian albums in its debut week, selling over 60,000 units nationwide.

=== Post Idol ===
After competing on Canadian Idol, Bustos began performing throughout Canada and the US at many events and showcases at top venues.

== Career ==
In the early mid 2000s, Bustos recorded, performed, and mastered his craft in New York City residing in Queens and Manhattan, collaborating and recording with producer Glenn Swan of the Chung King Studios.

In 2005, Bustos released his debut extended play entitled Love Me Again on May 7. It was produced by Brent Bodrug of B-Group Music, who previously had worked with Alanis Morissette, Jack Soul, and Sugar Jones.

In 2006, Bustos continued touring in the U.S. performing in New York, Chicago, Los Angeles, San Diego, and Las Vegas. He also began to perform in other countries, traveling to the Philippines, where he was front act for the Pussycat Dolls. Mikey also had a series of guest appearances, interviews, and live performances on popular Philippine TV shows including ABS-CBN's ASAP '06; and GMA-7's Eat Bulaga, StarTalk, SOP, S-Files, Unang Hirit, SIS, MTV Philippines, and even the country's first Philippine Idol. Mikey's radio performances and mall performance at Eastwood City in Manila were also highlights.

In 2007, Bustos was featured in a commercial for MTV Canada & was the front act for Christina Aguilera in the Philippines on July 6. He released a music video the next year for his single "If It Feels Good Then We Should" from his debut solo album Memoirs of a Superhero. The album was released on December 23, 2008, and its album art was designed by Orange Pop Media.

In 2009, Bustos' single "If It Feels Good Then We Should" reached Top 20 for multiple weeks on Canadian mainstream radio, as well as Top 2 Music Video on the California Music Channel in the US. His single "All I Need Is Me" was also played at Footlocker Stores nationwide. Under Bustos Entertainment Inc, he signed with Universal Music/North Fontana Distribution in May 2009.

In 2010, Bustos was nominated for a Toronto Independent Music Award for Best Adult Contemporary category. His song "Everytime My Heart Beats" from his debut album "Memoirs of a Superhero" since its release has become a YouTube phenomenon. Mikey was also involved in musical theater projects including a star role in the Summerworks production of Prison Dancer: The Musical.

In January 2014, Bustos joined the cast of the morning radio show Good Times with Mo on Magic 89.9 in the Philippines.

In 2017, Bustos hosted his own TV show Mikey Bustos: Your Pinoy Boy Vlogserye which aired on the Philippine regional station CLTV 36 (based in Pampanga).

=== YouTube ===
Bustos is also known for his comedic and musical parody videos uploaded on his personal YouTube channel, mostly covering various topics on Filipino culture, food, history and traditions.

Bustos also runs the YouTube channel AntsCanada, which focuses on ants, his ant colonies and other antkeeping topics. Bustos also operates the AntsCanada store in Toronto, which sells ant-keeping supplies made by Bustos in Manila.

== Personal life ==
Bustos came out as bisexual on April 22, 2019 via Instagram. He also disclosed that he is in a relationship with RJ Garcia, who is also his manager.

In 2021, Bustos was credited for discovering the presence of the species Meranoplus bicolor in the Philippines, after his findings were verified by Dr. David General, an ant taxonomist from the University of the Philippines. It is the 555th ant species discovered in the country.

== Product endorsements ==
In 2011, Bustos became the spokesperson and endorser for brands that included Samsung, Nescafé, and the Mang Juan snacks. His TV commercials for Chicharron ni Mang Juan run on Philippine television on all major networks nationwide.

=== Television ===
Year	Title	Role
2011	Bubble Gang	Guest
2011	Pets 101	AntsCanada
2012	Pepito Manaloto	Boy Pick Up
2012	Tweets for My Sweet	Dexter Matibag
2016	Daily Planet	AntsCanada
2017	Mikey Bustos: Your Pinoy Boy Vlogserye	Host
2021	Today with Hoda & Jenna	Guest

== Awards ==
Year	Award giving body	Category	Nominated work	Results
2011	Globe Tatt Awards	Video Slinger	—N/a	Won
