= Bagong Jeep =

Public transport service in the Philippines

Bagong Jeep (BEEP)
- Commenced operation: 2016
- Locale: Metro Manila; Cebu City
- Service type: Bus
- Operator: Various

Bagong Jeep, also known as the Bagong Jeepney, (abbreviated as BEEP) is a public transport service which maintains a fleet of minibuses and vans which are characterized as jeepneys.

== History ==
The Bagong Jeep (BEEP) program was launched in 2016 in Metro Manila coinciding with the implementation of the Philippine national government's public utility vehicle modernization program. The BEEP was meant as a replacement to old jeepneys in urban areas, hence the vehicles provided under the BEEP program are described as jeepneys. The vehicles under the BEEP program were tested as early as 2014 and were turned over to their operators in October 2016. The program was a private sector initiative by two groups namely the Kilusan sa Pagbabago ng Industriya ng Transportasyon (Kapit) and 1-Transport Equipment Aggregator and Management (1Team). The initial BEEP vehicles were provided through a loan by the Development Bank of the Philippines. It was intended that the BEEP vehicles not to operate as a single franchise.

In 2018, BDO Leasing and Finance (a Banco de Oro subsidiary) entered into a loan agreement with 1Team to finance at least five BEEP units. In December 2018, BEEP vehicles started servicing passengers in Cebu City.

Amidst the COVID-19 pandemic, BEEP made a full transition to a contactless payment for its Metro Manila fleet's fare collection system on October 1, 2020. This required all passengers to pay their fare through BeepRides, a contactless smart card. The similarity of the branding of BEEP's smart card and vehicles caused confusion with AF Payment's Beep card. This led to the Department of Transportation issuing a clarification that the BeepRides card and Beep (of AF Payment) are owned by two different companies.

== Payment system ==
The fare of BEEP's riders are process through an automated fare collection system. Riders have to use a contactless smart card known as BeepRides to pay their fare. Since October 1, 2020, all riders of BEEP had to pay their pay through their contactless smart card. The BeepRides card is distinct from AF Payment's Beep card also used in Metro Manila; with the former used for BEEP jeepneys while the latter is used for the MRT–LRT elevated rail systems and the buses operating in the EDSA Busway. The BeepRides card could also be used for select non-BEEP buses.

The automated fare collection system was tested as early as 2016, in six BEEP vehicles plying the Cubao-Lagro route and the Parang-Stop & Shop Marikina route.

== Fleet ==
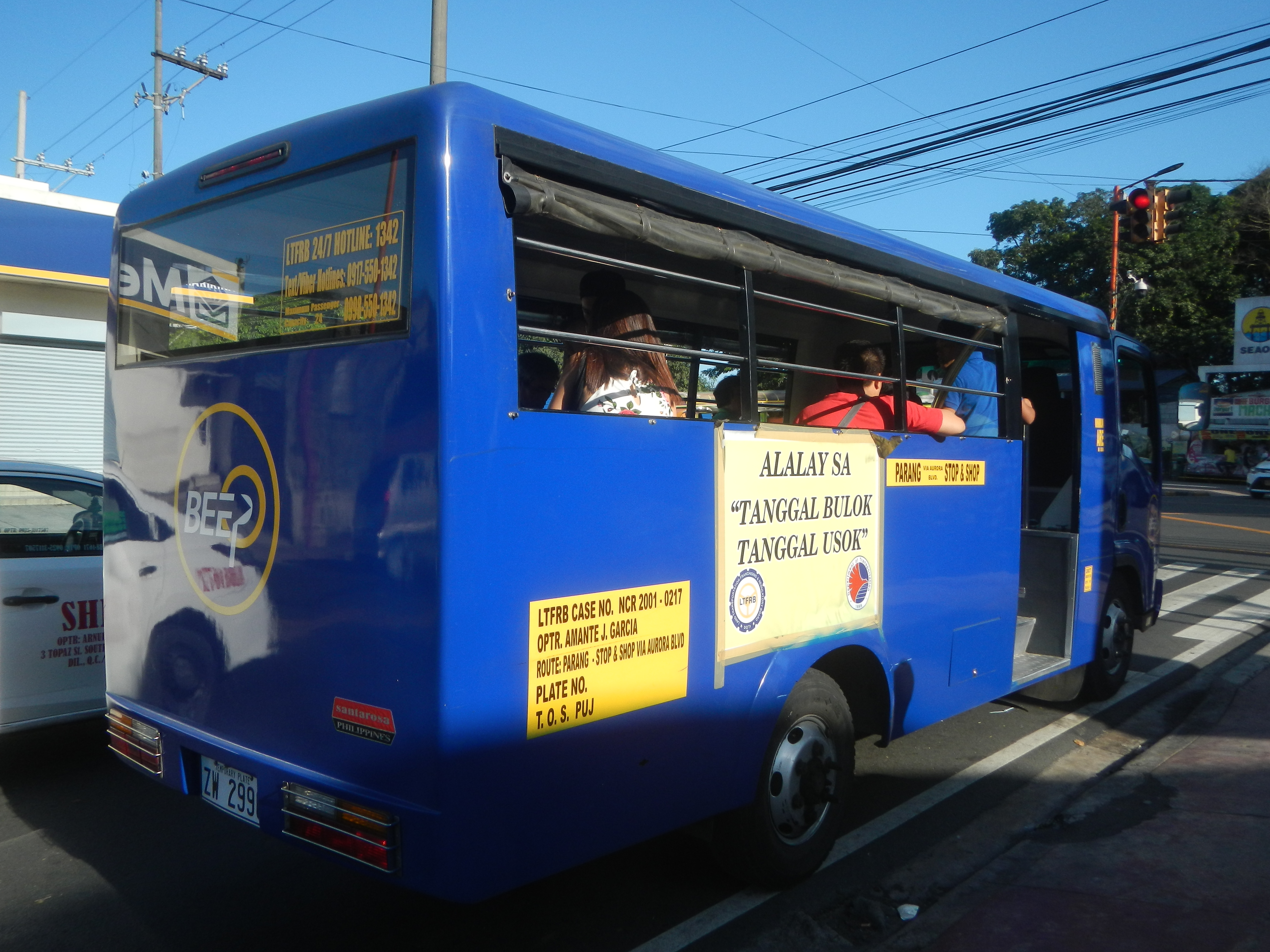
An open-air BEEP unit.

The vehicles used for the Beep Rides system are referred to as the Bagong Jeepney (BEEP). The vehicles are provided by IKK Ichigan, Inc. Some vehicles have their own air-conditioning system and are equipped with GPS tracking devices, dashboard cameras and CCTV cameras. BEEP vehicles, depending on the model, have the capacity to seat 16, 24 or 26 passengers at a time.
