= Dongfeng Yangtse =

Chinese bus manufacturing company

Dongfeng Yangtse 扬子江汽车集团有限公司
- Industry: Automotive
- Founded: 2004; 2016-05-23 (Dongfeng Yangtse)
- Headquarters: Wuhan, Hubei, China
- Products: Buses
- Website: https://dongfeng.su/en/

Yangtse Motor Group Co., Ltd (扬子江汽车集团有限公司), formerly Dongfeng Yangtse Automobile (Wuhan) Co., Ltd. (东风扬子江汽车(武汉)有限责任公司), was a bus manufacturing company based in Wuhan, Hubei, founded in 2004.

== History ==
Its roots trace back to 1929 when the Wuhan Bus Management office and repair shop was first set up. It started manufacturing vehicles in 1950. By 1964, the company became the Wuhan Public Bus Factory, manufacturing buses. In 1999, an agreement as signed with the Mercedes-Benz division in Thailand to develop new models of buses.

In 2004, the company was reorganized and named the Yangzijiang Dongfeng Automobile (Wuhan) Co., Ltd., commonly known as Dongfeng Yangtse Bus.

Buses are built under the Yangtse and Yangzijiang brands.

=== Dongfeng Yangtse era ===
On May 23, 2016, Yangzijiang Dongfeng Automobile (Wuhan) Co., Ltd. announced its renaming of the company to Yangtse Motor Group (扬子江汽车集团有限公司).

In September 2016, the first experimental hydrogen fuel cell bus, Taige, was completed at the factory. Its technological breakthrough lies in the use of a chemical absorbent to convert liquid hydrogen which absorbs and mixes it, and then uses a catalyst to reduce and release it, solving the problem of storage and transportation of hydrogen energy that is dangerous or costly. The traditional hydrogen dilemma is that it must be stored at low temperature or high pressure. Low temperature requires a lot of electricity. It is completely uneconomical. Although, it is cheap, it is also a high-priced product, and it has major safety hazards when it is popularized in the market for civilian use. The breakthrough technology lies in Professor Cheng Hansong, an expert of the Thousand Talents Program, who is the world's leading and original disruptive "normal temperature and normal pressure hydrogen storage technology", which can make use of the existing infrastructure such as gas stations and oil transportation systems, greatly reducing the hydrogen economy problems.

== Models ==
- WG6100NHA
- WG6100NH0E
- WG6101NQE
- WG6110CHM4
- WG6110NQC
- WG6110NQE
- WG6111NQC
- WG6111NQE
- WG6120BEVHM
- WG6120CHA
- WG6120NHAE
- WG6120NHM4
- WG6120PHEVAA
- WG6121NQOE
- WG6124BEVH
- WG6810NQP
- WG6850NHK

WG6940NQD

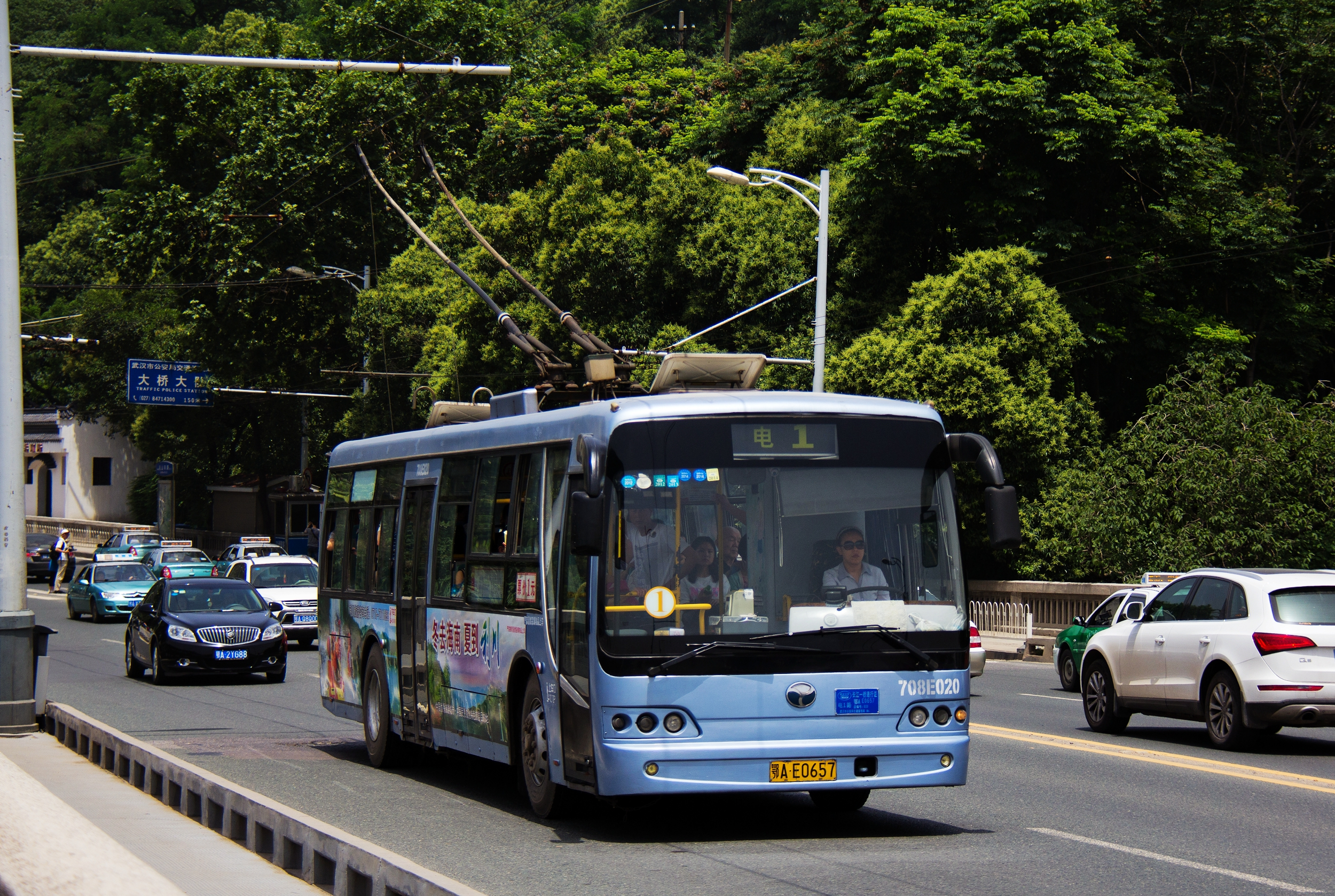
Yangtse WGD61U

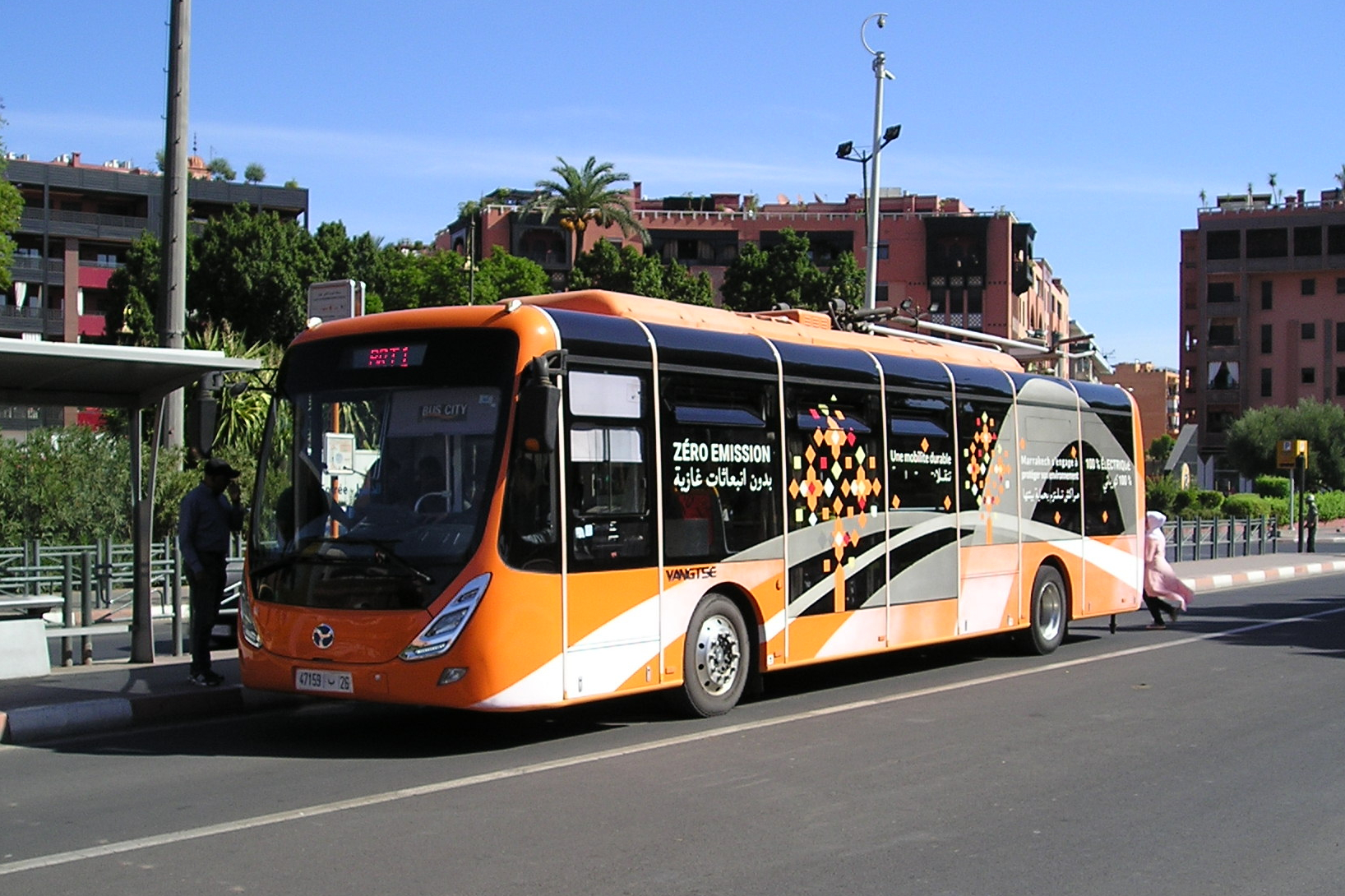

== Trolley Buses ==
WG6120BHEVM

WG6124BHEVM

WG6120DHA

WG-D68U
