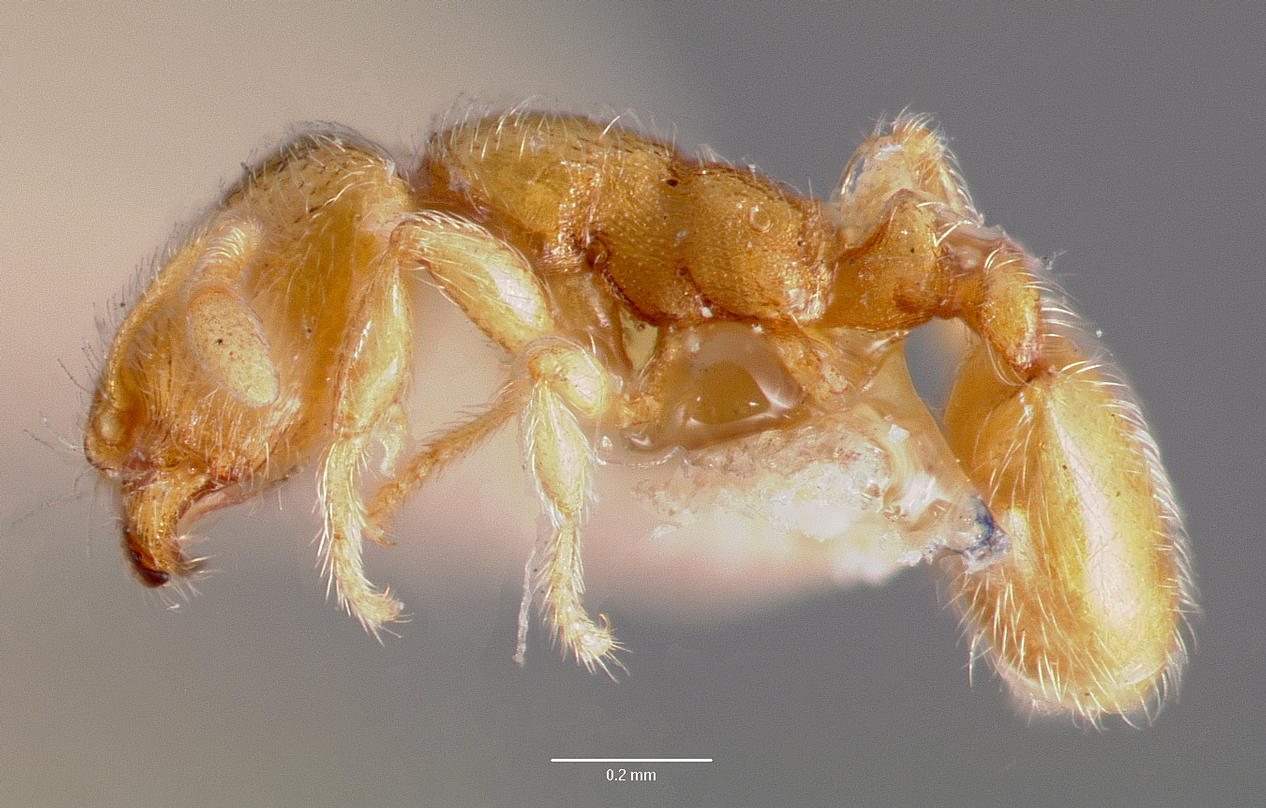
- Carebara longii worker from the United States

Scientific classification
- Kingdom: Animalia
- Phylum: Arthropoda
- Clade: Pancrustacea
- Class: Insecta
- Order: Hymenoptera
- Family: Formicidae
- Subfamily: Myrmicinae
- Tribe: Crematogastrini
- Alliance: Carebara genus group
- Genus: Carebara; Westwood, 1840

Type species
- Carebara lignata

Diversity
- 243 species

Synonyms
- List: Aeromyrma Forel, 1891; Afroxyidris Belshaw & Bolton, 1994; Amauromyrmex Wheeler, 1929; Aneleus Emery, 1900; Crateropsis Patrizi, 1948; Erebomyrma Wheeler, 1903; Hendecatella Wheeler, 1927; Idrisella Santschi, 1937; Lecanomyrma Forel, 1913; Neoblepharidatta Sheela & Narendran, 1997; Nimbamyrma Bernard, 1953; Oligomyrmex Mayr, 1867; Paedalgus Forel, 1911; Parvimyrma Eguchi & Bui, 2007; Pheidologeton Mayr, 1862; Phidologeton Bingham, 1903; Solenops Karavaiev, 1930; Spelaeomyrmex Wheeler, 1922; Sporocleptes Arnold, 1948

= Carebara =

Genus of ants

Carebara is a genus of ants in the subfamily Myrmicinae. It is one of the largest myrmicine genera with more than 200 species distributed worldwide in the tropics and the Afrotropical region. Many of them are very tiny cryptic soil and leaf-litter inhabitants. They nest in rotten wood to which the bark is still adherent in the Afrotropical region, or may be lestobiotic, nesting near other ant species. Some species are known to exist parasitically within termite nests. Little is known about the biology of the genus, but they are notable for the vast difference in size between queens and workers. In Tanzania's Lake Victoria, Arusha, and Morogoro Regions, Carebara queens are hunted and consumed; they are locally known as wadudu mafuta, meaning "fat insects".

== Species ==
=== Extant ===
- Carebara aberrans (Santschi, 1937)
- Carebara aborensis (Wheeler, 1913)
- Carebara acuta (Weber, 1952)
- Carebara acutispina (Xu, 2003)
- Carebara adisaki Wimolsuthikul & Jaitrong, 2024
- Carebara affinis (Jerdon, 1851)
- Carebara afghana (Pisarski, 1970)
- Carebara africana (Forel, 1910)
- Carebara alluaudi (Santschi, 1913)
- Carebara alperti Fernández, 2010
- Carebara alpha (Forel, 1905)
- Carebara altinodus (Xu, 2003)
- Carebara amia (Forel, 1913)
- Carebara ampla Santschi, 1912
- Carebara angolensis (Santschi, 1914)
- Carebara angulata Fernández, 2004
- Carebara anophthalma (Emery, 1906)
- Carebara arabara Fernández, 2010
- Carebara arabica (Collingwood & Van Harten, 2001)
- Carebara armata (Donisthorpe, 1948)
- Carebara arnoldi (Forel, 1913)
- Carebara arnoldiella (Santschi, 1919)
- Carebara asina (Forel, 1902)
- Carebara atoma (Emery, 1900)
- Carebara audita Fernández, 2004
- Carebara bara Azorsa & Fisher, 2018
- Carebara bartrumi Weber, 1943
- Carebara bengalensis (Forel, 1902)
- Carebara berivelo Azorsa & Fisher, 2018
- Carebara beta (Forel, 1905)
- Carebara betsi Azorsa & Fisher, 2018
- Carebara bicarinata Santschi, 1912
- Carebara bifida Matsuura et al., 2025
- Carebara bihornata (Xu, 2003)
- Carebara bokorensis Matsuura & Hosoishi, 2024
- Carebara borealis (Terayama, 1996)
- Carebara bouvardi (Santschi, 1913)
- Carebara brasiliana Fernández, 2004
- Carebara brevipilosa Fernández, 2004
- Carebara bruchi (Santschi, 1933)
- Carebara bruni (Forel, 1913)
- Carebara butteli (Forel, 1913)
- Carebara capreola (Wheeler, 1927)
- Carebara carinata Bharti & Kumar, 2013
- Carebara castanea Smith, 1858
- Carebara ceylonensis (Forel, 1911)
- Carebara coeca Fernández, 2004
- Carebara colobopsis Hosoishi & Yamane, 2022
- Carebara concinna (Mayr, 1867)
- Carebara convexa (Weber, 1950)
- Carebara coqueta Fernández, 2006
- Carebara cornigera (Forel, 1902)
- Carebara crassiuscula (Emery, 1900)
- Carebara creolei Azorsa & Fisher, 2018
- Carebara cribriceps (Wheeler, 1927)
- Carebara crigensis (Belshaw & Bolton, 1994)
- Carebara curvispina (Xu, 2003)
- Carebara dazia Fisher, 2025
- Carebara debilis (Santschi, 1913)
- Carebara demeter Azorsa & Fisher, 2018
- Carebara dentata Bharti & Kumar, 2013
- Carebara deponens (Walker, 1859)
- Carebara diabola (Santschi, 1913)
- Carebara diabolica (Baroni Urbani, 1969)
- Carebara distincta (Bolton & Belshaw, 1993)
- Carebara diversa (Jerdon, 1851)
- Carebara donisthorpei (Weber, 1950)
- Carebara dota Azorsa & Fisher, 2018
- Carebara eguchii Matsuura et al., 2025
- Carebara elmenteitae (Patrizi, 1948)
- Carebara elongata Fernández, 2004
- Carebara erythraea (Emery, 1915)
- Carebara escherichi (Forel, 1911)
- Carebara fayrouzae Sharaf, 2013
- Carebara frontalis (Weber, 1950)
- Carebara globularia Fernández, 2004
- Carebara grandidieri (Forel, 1891)
- Carebara guineana Fernández, 2006
- Carebara gustavmayri Fischer et al., 2014
- Carebara hainteny Azorsa & Fisher, 2018
- Carebara hammoniae (Stitz, 1923)
- Carebara hannya (Terayama, 1996)
- Carebara hiragasy Azorsa & Fisher, 2018
- Carebara hornata Bharti & Kumar, 2013
- Carebara hostilis (Smith, 1858)
- Carebara hunanensis (Wu & Wang, 1995)
- Carebara inca Fernández, 2004
- Carebara incerta (Santschi, 1919)
- Carebara incierta Fernández, 2004
- Carebara infima (Santschi, 1913)
- Carebara intermedia Fernández, 2004
- Carebara jacobsoni (Forel, 1911)
- Carebara jajoby Azorsa & Fisher, 2018
- Carebara jeanneli (Santschi, 1913)
- Carebara jiangxiensis (Wu & Wang, 1995)
- Carebara junodi Forel, 1904
- Carebara kabosy Azorsa & Fisher, 2018
- Carebara khamiensis (Arnold, 1952)
- Carebara kofana Fernández, 2004
- Carebara kunensis (Ettershank, 1966)
- Carebara lamellifrons (Forel, 1902)
- Carebara langi Wheeler, 1922
- Carebara latinoda (Zhou & Zheng, 1997)
- Carebara latro (Santschi, 1937)
- Carebara leei (Forel, 1902)
- Carebara lignata Westwood, 1840
- Carebara lilith Fischer et al., 2015
- Carebara lithophila Yamane et al., 2025
- Carebara longiceps (Santschi, 1929)
- Carebara longii (Wheeler, 1903)
- Carebara lova Azorsa & Fisher, 2018
- Carebara lucida (Santschi, 1917)
- Carebara lusciosa (Wheeler, 1928)
- Carebara luzonensis Fischer et al., 2014
- Carebara maccus (Wheeler, 1929)
- Carebara madibai Fischer & Azorsa, 2014
- Carebara mahafaly Azorsa & Fisher, 2018
- Carebara majeri Fernández, 2004
- Carebara malagasy Azorsa & Fisher, 2018
- Carebara manni (Donisthorpe, 1941)
- Carebara mayri (Forel, 1901)
- Carebara melanocephala (Donisthorpe, 1948)
- Carebara melasolena (Zhou & Zheng, 1997)
- Carebara menozzii (Ettershank, 1966)
- Carebara minima (Emery, 1900)
- Carebara minuta Fernández, 2004
- Carebara mjobergi (Forel, 1915)
- Carebara mukkaliensis Bharti & Akbar, 2014
- Carebara nana (Santschi, 1919)
- Carebara nanningensis (Li & Tang, 1986)
- Carebara nayana (Sheela & Narendran, 1997)
- Carebara nicotianae (Arnold, 1948)
- Carebara norfolkensis (Donisthorpe, 1941)
- Carebara nosindambo (Forel, 1891)
- Carebara nuda Fernández, 2004
- Carebara obscura (Viehmeyer, 1914)
- Carebara obtusidenta (Xu, 2003)
- Carebara octata (Bolton & Belshaw, 1993)
- Carebara oertzeni (Forel, 1886)
- Carebara omasi Azorsa & Fisher, 2018
- Carebara oni (Terayama, 1996)
- Carebara osborni Wheeler, 1922
- Carebara overbecki (Viehmeyer, 1916)
- Carebara paeta (Santschi, 1937)
- Carebara panamensis (Wheeler, 1925)
- Carebara panhai Jaitrong et al., 2021
- Carebara parva Wimolsuthikul & Jaitrong, 2024
- Carebara patrizii Menozzi, 1927
- Carebara paya Fernández, 2004
- Carebara periyarensis Dhadwal & Bharti, 2022
- Carebara perpusilla (Emery, 1895)
- Carebara peruviana (Emery, 1906)
- Carebara petulca (Wheeler, 1922)
- Carebara petulens (Santschi, 1920)
- Carebara phragmotica Fischer et al., 2015
- Carebara pilosa Fernández, 2004
- Carebara pisinna (Bolton & Belshaw, 1993)
- Carebara placida Azorsa & Fisher, 2018
- Carebara polyphemus (Wheeler, 1928)
- Carebara propomegata Bharti & Kumar, 2013
- Carebara pseudolusciosa (Wu & Wang, 1995)
- Carebara pullata (Santschi, 1920)
- Carebara pumilia Fischer et al., 2014
- Carebara pygmaea (Emery, 1887)
- Carebara qianliyan Terayama, 2009
- Carebara quratulain Akbar & Bharti, 2017
- Carebara raberi Azorsa & Fisher, 2018
- Carebara raja (Forel, 1902)
- Carebara rara (Bolton & Belshaw, 1993)
- Carebara rectangulata Bharti & Kumar, 2013
- Carebara rectidorsa (Xu, 2003)
- Carebara reina Fernández, 2004
- Carebara reticapita (Xu, 2003)
- Carebara reticulata Fernández, 2004
- Carebara robertsoni (Bolton & Belshaw, 1993)
- Carebara rothneyi (Forel, 1902)
- Carebara rubra (Smith, 1860)
- Carebara rugata (Forel, 1913)
- Carebara rugoflabella Fischer et al., 2014
- Carebara sakamotoi Terayama et al., 2012
- Carebara salegi Azorsa & Fisher, 2018
- Carebara sampi Azorsa & Fisher, 2018
- Carebara sangi (Eguchi & Bui, 2007)
- Carebara santschii (Weber, 1943)
- Carebara sarasinorum (Emery, 1901)
- Carebara sarita (Bolton & Belshaw, 1993)
- Carebara satana (Karavaiev, 1935)
- Carebara sauteri (Forel, 1912)
- Carebara semilaevis (Mayr, 1901)
- Carebara sharjahensis (Mayr, 1901)
- Carebara sicheli Mayr, 1862
- Carebara silenus (Smith, 1858)
- Carebara silvestrii (Santschi, 1914)
- Carebara similis (Mayr, 1862)
- Carebara sinhala Fische et al., 2014
- Carebara sodalis (Emery, 1914)
- Carebara solitaria (Stitz, 1910)
- Carebara spinata Bharti & Kumar, 2013
- Carebara stenoptera (Kusnezov, 1952)
- Carebara striata (Xu, 2003)
- Carebara sublatro (Forel, 1913)
- Carebara subreptor (Emery, 1900)
- Carebara sudanensis (Weber, 1943)
- Carebara sudanica Santschi, 1933
- Carebara sundaica (Forel, 1913)
- Carebara tahitiensis (Wheeler, 1936)
- Carebara taiponica (Wheeler, 1928)
- Carebara tana Azorsa & Fisher, 2018
- Carebara tanana Azorsa & Fisher, 2018
- Carebara tenua Fernández, 2004
- Carebara terayamai Bharti & Akbar, 2014
- Carebara termitolestes (Wheeler, 1918)
- Carebara thoracica (Weber, 1950)
- Carebara traegaordhi (Santschi, 1914)
- Carebara transversalis (Smith, 1860)
- Carebara trechideros (Zhou & Zheng, 1997)
- Carebara ugandana (Santschi, 1923)
- Carebara urichi (Wheeler, 1922)
- Carebara varia (Santschi, 1920)
- Carebara vazimba Azorsa & Fisher, 2018
- Carebara vespillo (Wheeler, 1921)
- Carebara vidua Smith, 1858
- Carebara viehmeyeri (Mann, 1919)
- Carebara villiersi (Bernard, 1953)
- Carebara volsellata (Santschi, 1937)
- Carebara vorax (Santschi, 1914)
- Carebara weyeri (Karavaiev, 1930)
- Carebara wheeleri (Ettershank, 1966)
- Carebara wroughtonii (Forel, 1902)
- Carebara xynera Fisher, 2025
- Carebara yamatonis (Terayama, 1996)
- Carebara yanoi (Forel, 1912)
- Carebara zengchengensis (Zhou et al., 2006)

=== Extinct ===
- †Carebara andrushchenkoi Zharkov & Dubovikoff, 2025
- †Carebara antiqua (Mayr, 1868)
- †Carebara groehni Radchenko & Dlussky, 2019
- †Carebara kutscheri Radchenko et al., 2019
- †Carebara nitida (Dlussky & Perkovsky, 2002)
- †Carebara rugiceps (Heer, 1849)
- †Carebara schossnicensis (Assmann, 1870)
- †Carebara sophiae (Emery, 1891)
- †Carebara thorali (Théobald, 1937)
- †Carebara ucrainica (Dlussky & Perkovsky, 2002)
