= List of Philippine films of 2021 =

This is an incomplete list of Filipino full-length films, both mainstream and independently produced, released in theaters and cinemas in 2021. Some films are in production but do not have definite release dates.

- – an entry film for Pista ng Pelikulang Pilipino.
- – an entry film for Metro Manila Film Festival.

== January–March ==
Opening		Title	Production company	Cast and crew	Ref.
J A N U A R Y	1	Princess DayaReese	Star Cinema	Barry Gonzalez (director); Maymay Entrata, Edward Barber	
J A N U A R Y	22	Run	Mel Magno Film Company	Mel Magno (director); Keann Johnson, JR Versales	
J A N U A R Y	22	Steal	Viva Films / BluArt Productions	Bona Fajardo (director); Ella Cruz, Meg Imperial, Jennifer Lee, Nathalie Hart	
J A N U A R Y	29	Paglaki Ko, Gusto Kong Maging Pornstar	Viva Films / VinCentiments / Vivamax	Darryl Yap (director); Alma Moreno, Rosanna Roces, Ara Mina, Maui Taylor	
J A N U A R Y	30	Anak ng Macho Dancer	Godfather Productions	Joel Lamangan (director); Sean de Guzman	
F E B R U A R Y	6	Memories of Forgetting	2076 Kolektib	Joselito Altarejos (director); Dexter Doria, Noel Escondo, Jonathan Ivan Rivera	
F E B R U A R Y	12	Hello Stranger: The Movie	Black Sheep Productions	Dwein Baltazar (director); Tony Labrusca, JC Alcantara	
M A R C H	5	Ayuda Babes	Saranggola Media Productions	Joven Tan (director); Iyah Mina, Gardo Versoza	
M A R C H	5	Tililing	Viva Films / VinCentiments	Darryl Yap (director); Gina Pareño, Baron Geisler, Chad Kinis, Cai Cortez, Donnalyn Bartolome, Candy Pangilinan	
M A R C H	12	Love or Money	Star Cinema	Mae Cruz-Alviar (director); Coco Martin, Angelica Panganiban	
M A R C H	24	Biyernes Santo	Viva Films	Pedring Lopez (director); Ella Cruz	
M A R C H	31	Dito at Doon	TBA Studios / WASD Films	JP Habac (director); Janine Gutierrez, JC Santos	

== April–June ==
Opening		Title	Production company	Cast and crew	Ref.
A P R I L	8	Lamentasyon	Upnext Productions / People on the Go	Chino Pereira (director); Jiro Tejero, Arnold Briones, Vhie Laurilla, Mariah Jewel Pencil	
A P R I L	9	General Admission	ProVill / Oxxipital	Jeffrey Hidalgo (director); Jasmine Curtis-Smith, JC de Vera	
A P R I L	23	Death of Nintendo	Black Sheep Productions / Indieflip	Raya Martin (director); Noel Comia Jr., Kim Cloie Oquiendo, Jiggerfelip Seventilla, John Vincent Servilla	
A P R I L	30	Death of a Girlfriend	Viva Films	Yam Laranas (director/screenplay); Diego Loyzaga, AJ Raval	
A P R I L	30	Deeply in Love	Balangao Films	Lemuel W. Fangonon (director); Cresencio Caisan, Alennay Magangat, Granill Magno	
A P R I L	30	The Herald and the Horror	LightShow Studio	Jayvee Kang Margaja (director); Tere Gonzales, Vic Trio, Odette Leyba	
M A Y	5	Mommy Issues	Regal Entertainment	Jose Javier Reyes (director); Pokwang, Sue Ramirez, Gloria Diaz	
M A Y	20	Versus	ADCC Film Production	Ralston Gonzales (director); Gabby Eigenmann, Sunshine Dizon, Noel Comia Jr.	
M A Y	22	Don Filipo	Pink Elephant Productions	Tim Muñoz (director); Adrian Arias, Beverly Benny, Dindeth Ditablan	
M A Y	28	Kaka	Viva Films / Five 2 Seven Entertainment Production	GB Sampedro (director); Sunshine Guimary, Ion Perez, Jerald Napoles	
M A Y	28	Momshies! Ang Soul Mo’y Akin	Star Cinema	Easy Ferrer (director/screenplay); Jolina Magdangal, Melai Canteveros, Karla Estrada	
J U N E	11	Ang Babaeng Walang Pakiramdam	Viva Films / VinCentiments	Darryl Yap (director); Kim Molina, Jerald Napoles	
J U N E	18	Sana All	BluArt Productions / Viva Films	Bona Fajardo (director); Meg Imperial, Arvic James Tan	
J U N E	24	A Girl and a Guy	Upstream	Erik Matti (director); Alexa Miro, Rob Gomez	

Color key

- – a Metro Manila Summer Film Festival entry film
- – a Sinag Maynila Film Festival entry film

== July–September ==
Opening		Title	Production company	Cast and crew	Ref.
J U L Y	2	Gluta	Viva Films / VinCentiments	Darryl Yap (director); Ella Cruz, Juliana Parizcova Segovia	
J U L Y	9	Silab	Viva Films / 3:16 Media Network	Joel Lamangan (director); Jason Abalos, Marco Gomez, Cloe Barreto	
J U L Y	9	Tenement 66	Dreamscape Entertainment / Epic Media / iWantTFC	Rae Red (director); Francis Magundayao, Francine Diaz, Noel Comia Jr.	
J U L Y	15	My Amanda	Netflix	Alessandra de Rossi (director); Piolo Pascual, Alessandra de Rossi	
J U L Y	16	The Other Wife	Viva Films / Vivamax	Prime Cruz (director); Joem Bascon, Rhen Escaño, Lovi Poe	
J U L Y	23	Lockdown	For the Love of Arts Films	Joel Lamangan (director); Paolo Gumabao	
J U L Y	30	Gameboys: The Movie	The IdeaFirst Company / October Train Films	Ivan Andrew Payawal (director); Kokoy de Santos, Elijah Canlas	
J U L Y	30	Nerisa	Viva Films	Lawrence Fajardo (director); Cindy Miranda, Aljur Abrenica	
A U G U S T	6	Revirginized	Viva Films / VinCentiments	Darryl Yap (director); Sharon Cuneta, Marco Gumabao	
A U G U S T	13	Ikaw at Ako at ang Ending	Viva Films	Irene Emma Villamor (director); Kim Molina, Jerald Napoles	
A U G U S T	13	Nang Dumating si Joey	Blank Pages Productions	Arlyn dela Cruz (director); Allan Paule, Ernie Garcia, Rash Juzen	
A U G U S T	19	A Faraway Land	Mavx Productions Inc. / Netflix	Veronica Velasco (director); Paolo Contis, Yen Santos	
A U G U S T	21	Sin	Mel Magno Film Company	Mel Magno (director); Alvin Fortuna, Zhay Cuevas, Clifford Pusing, Kiko Flores, Miko Manapul	
A U G U S T	27	Taya	Viva Films	Roman Perez Jr. (director); AJ Raval, Sean de Guzman	
S E P T E M B E R	3	69+1	Viva Films / VinCentiments	Darryl Yap (director); Janno Gibbs, Maui Taylor, Rose Van Ginkel	
S E P T E M B E R	10	The Housemaid	Viva Films / Vivamax	Roman Perez Jr. (director); Kylie Verzosa	
S E P T E M B E R	17	Bekis on the Run	Viva Films	Joel Lamangan (director); Christian Bables, Diego Loyzaga, Kylie Verzosa, Sean de Guzman	
S E P T E M B E R	24	Paraluman	Viva Films / Mesh Lab	Yam Laranas (director); Rhen Escaño, Jao Mapa	

Color key

- – a Cinemalaya Philippine Independent Film Festival entry film
- – a Pista ng Pelikulang Pilipino entry film
- – a ToFarm (The Outstanding Farmers in the Philippines) Film Festival entry film

== October–December ==
Opening		Title	Production company	Cast and crew	Ref.
O C T O B E R	1	Ang Manananggal na Nahahati ang Puso	Viva Films / VinCentiments	Darryl Yap (director); Aubrey Caraan, Marco Gallo, Teresa Loyzaga, Gina Pareño	
O C T O B E R	8	Shoot Shoot!	Viva Films / Vivamax	Al Tantay (director); Andrew E., AJ Raval, Sunshine Guimary	
O C T O B E R	15	Sarap Mong Patayin	Viva Films / VinCentiments	Darryl Yap (director); Ariella Arida, Lassy Marquez, Kit Thompson	
O C T O B E R	22	House Tour	Viva Films	Roman Perez Jr. (director); Mark Anthony Fernandez, Diego Loyzaga, Marco Gomez, Rafa Siguion-Reyna, Sunshine Guimary, Cindy Miranda	
O C T O B E R	22	Izla	Mavx Productions	Barry Gonzalez III (director); Paolo Contis, Elisse Joson, Isabelle Daza, Beauty Gonzalez	
O C T O B E R	22	Will You Marry	Mavx Productions	Veronica Velasco (director); K Brosas, Elisse Joson	
O C T O B E R	29	Sa Haba ng Gabi	Viva Films / Reality Entertainment / Vivamax	Miko Livelo (director); Candy Pangilinan, Jerald Napoles, Kim Molina	
N O V E M B E R	5	Barumbadings	Viva Films / VinCentiments	Darryl Yap (director); Baron Geisler, Mark Anthony Fernandez, Jeric Raval	
N O V E M B E R	12	Ikaw	Mavx Productions	Marla Ancheta (director); Janine Gutierrez, Pepe Herrera, Pilita Corrales	
N O V E M B E R	12	Mahjong Nights	Viva Films	Lawrence Fajardo (director); Angeli Khang, Sean de Guzman	
N O V E M B E R	12	Rabid	Upstream	Erik Matti (director); Vance Larena, Ricci Rivero, Donna Cariaga, Chesca Diaz, Jake Macapagal, Ameera Johara, Ayeesha Cervantes	
N O V E M B E R	17	Mang Jose	Viva Films / Vivamax / Project 8 Projects	Raynier Brizuela (director); Janno Gibbs, Manilyn Reynes, Bing Loyzaga, Jerald Napoles, Leo Martinez	
N O V E M B E R	19	More Than Blue	Viva Films / Vivamax	Nuel Naval (director); JC Santos, Yassi Pressman	
N O V E M B E R	22	He's Into Her: The Movie Cut	iWantTFC	Chad Vidanes (director); Donny Pangilinan, Belle Mariano	
N O V E M B E R	26	My Husband, My Lover	Viva Films	Mac Alejandre (director); Kylie Verzosa, Marco Gumabao, Cindy Miranda	
D E C E M B E R	3	Pornstar 2: Pangalawang Putok	Viva Films / Vivamax / VinCentiments	Darryl Yap (director); Alma Moreno, Rosanna Roces, Maui Taylor, Ara Mina	
D E C E M B E R	9	Arisaka	Ten17P	Mikhail Red (director); Maja Salvador, Mon Confiado	
D E C E M B E R	10	Dulo	Viva Films	Fifth Solomon (director); Diego Loyzaga, Barbie Imperial	
D E C E M B E R	10	Ero	Upstream PH / Globe Studios	Miko Livelo, Joel Ferrer (director); Gabbi Garcia, Alex Diaz, Markus Paterson, Dylan Ray Talon, Anikka Camaya, Dino Pastrano	
D E C E M B E R	10	Palitan	Viva Films / Center Stage Productions	Brillante Mendoza (director); Luis Hontiveros, Rash Flores, Jela Cuenca, Cara Gonzales	
D E C E M B E R	10	Love Is Color Blind	Star Cinema	John Leo Garcia (director); Donny Pangilinan, Belle Mariano	
D E C E M B E R	15	Caught in the Act	MPJ Entertainment Productions	Perry Escaño (director/screenplay); Andi Abaya, Joaquin Domagoso	
D E C E M B E R	16	Gensan Punch	Center Stage Productions / Gentle Underground Monkeys	Brillante Mendoza (director); Shogen, Beauty Gonzalez, Ronnie Lazaro, Kaho Minami	
D E C E M B E R	17	Crush Kong Curly	Viva Films / Five 2 Seven Entertainment Production	GB Sampedro (director); AJ Raval, Wilbert Ross	
D E C E M B E R	17	Happy Times	Reality MM Studios / Upstream PH	Ice Idanan (director); Sharlene San Pedro, Ricci Rivero, Heaven Peralejo	
D E C E M B E R	22	Deception	Viva Films	Joel Lamangan (director); Claudine Barretto, Mark Anthony Fernandez	
D E C E M B E R	24	Eva	Viva Films / Great Media Productions	Jeffrey Hidalgo (director); Angeli Khang, Sab Aggabao, Marco Gomez, Ivan Padilla, Angelica Cervantes, Quinn Carillo	
D E C E M B E R	25	A Hard Day	Viva Films	Lawrence Fajardo (director); Dingdong Dantes, John Arcilla	
D E C E M B E R	25	Big Night!	Cignal Entertainment, The IdeaFirst Company, Octobertrain Films, Quantum Films	Jun Lana (director); Christian Bables, John Arcilla	
D E C E M B E R	25	Huling Ulan sa Tag-Araw	Heaven's Best Entertainment	Louie Ignacio (director); Rita Daniela, Ken Chan	
D E C E M B E R	25	Huwag Kang Lalabas	Obra Cinema	Adolfo Alix Jr. (director); Kim Chiu, Jameson Blake, Beauty Gonzalez, Aiko Melendez	
D E C E M B E R	25	Kun Maupay Man it Panahon	Cinematografica, Plan C, House on Fire, iWantTFC, Globe Studios, Black Sheep Productions, Quantum Films, AAAND Company, Kawankawan Media, Weydemann Bros., CMB Films	Carlo Francisco Manatad (director); Charo Santos, Daniel Padilla, Rans Rifol	
D E C E M B E R	25	Love at First Stream	Star Cinema, Kumu	Cathy Garcia-Molina (director); Kaori Oinuma, Jeremiah Lisbo, Daniela Stranner, Anthony Jennings	
D E C E M B E R	25	Nelia	A and Q Production Films, Inc.	Lester Dimaranan (director); Winwyn Marquez, Raymond Bagatsing	
D E C E M B E R	25	The Exorsis	TINCAN	Fifth Solomon (director); Alex Gonzaga, Toni Gonzaga	
D E C E M B E R	31	Sanggano, Sanggago’t Sanggwapo 2: Aussie! Aussie (O Sige)	Viva Films / Vivamax	Al Tantay (director); Andrew E., Dennis Padilla, Janno Gibbs	

Color key

- – a Cinema One Originals Film Festival entry film
- – a QCinema International Film Festival entry film
- – a Metro Manila Film Festival entry film

== Awards ==
=== Local ===
The following list shows the Best Picture winners at the four major film awards: FAMAS Awards, Gawad Urian Awards, Luna Awards, and Star Awards; and at the three major film festivals: Metro Manila Film Festival, Cinemalaya, and Cinema One Originals.

Award/Festival	Best Picture		Ref.
70th FAMAS Awards	Katips		
45th Gawad Urian	OTJ:The Missing 8, Big Night! (tie)		
Luna Awards	not held		
38th Star Awards for Movies	OTJ:The Missing 8	Katips	
32nd Young Critics Circle Citations	Historya ni Ha		
24th Gawad Pasado	Kun Maupay Man It Panahon		
20th Gawad Tanglaw	not held		
5th Eddys Awards	OTJ:The Missing 8		
2nd Pinoy Rebyu Awards	Kun Maupay Man It Panahon		
47th Metro Manila Film Festival	Big Night!		
17th Cinemalaya Independent Film Festival	Beauty Queen (short film)		
9th QCinema International Film Festival	I Get So Sad Sometimes (short film)		
Cinema One Originals Film Festival	[discontinued]		
CineFilipino Film Festival	[discontinued]		
Sinag Maynila Film Festival	[discontinued]		
ToFarm Film Festival	[discontinued]		
Pista ng Pelikulang Pilipino	[discontinued]		

.
