= 45th Gawad Urian Awards =

2022 Philippine film awards ceremony

- Date: November 17, 2022
- Site: Cine Adarna, University of the Philippines Diliman

Highlights
- Best Picture: Big Night! and On the Job: The Missing 8
- Most awards: On the Job: The Missing 8 (9)
- Most nominations: On the Job: The Missing 8 (12)

The 45th Gawad Urian Awards (Filipino: Ika-45 na Gawad Urian) is held on November 17, 2022. Established in 1976, the Gawad Urian Awards highlights the best of Philippine cinema as decided by the Filipino Film Critics. A total of 79 films released in 2021 are considered for this year's awards ceremony with fourteen of them making it to the nomination list. The ceremony is held at Cine Adarna in the University of the Philippines Diliman in Quezon City.

The Best Picture award is shared by the 2021 Metro Manila Film Festival Best Picture winner, Big Night!, and the Philippines' submission for the 95th Academy Awards, On the Job: The Missing 8.

== Winners and nominees ==
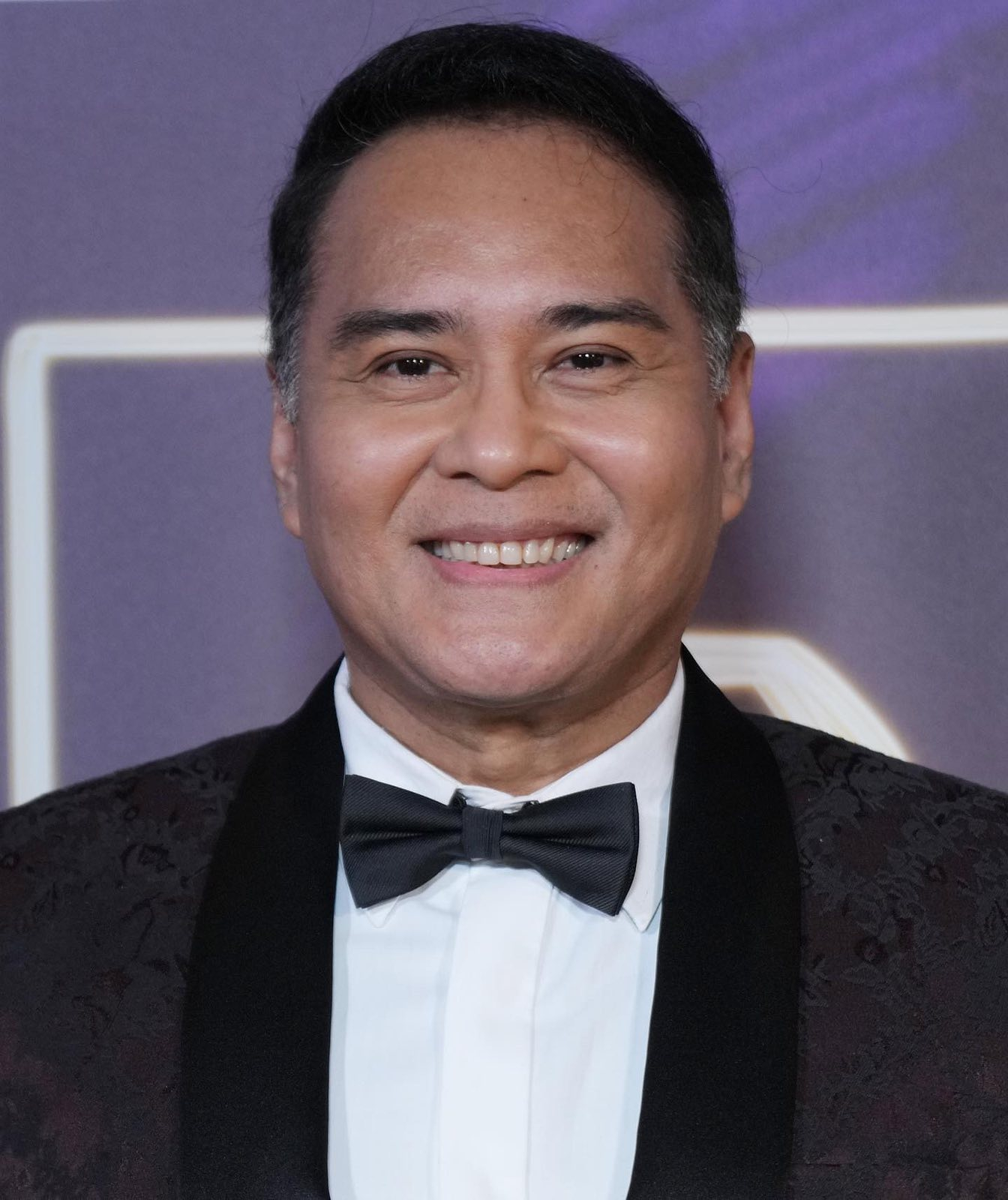
John Arcilla wins the Best Actor prize for his role as a radio jockey and newspaper editor in On the Job: The Missing 8, a role that also wins him the Volpi Cup for Best Actor in the Venice Film Festival.

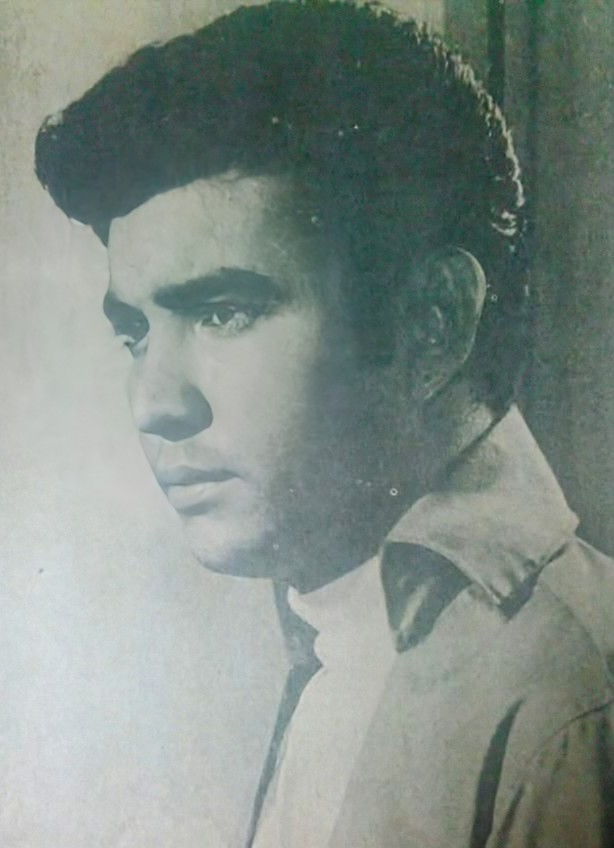
Dante Rivero clinches the Best Supporting Actor title for his role as Mayor Pedring Eusebio in Erik Matti's On the Job: The Missing 8.

Winners are listed first and bolded.

Best Picture Pinakamahusay na Pelikula	Best Director Pinakamahusay na Direksyon
**Big Night!**; **On the Job: The Missing 8**; Historya ni Ha; Kun Maupay Man it Panahon; Walang Kasarian ang Digmang Bayan	**Erik Matti – On the Job: The Missing 8**; Carlo Francisco Manatad – Kun Maupay Man it Panahon; Joselito Altarejos – Walang Kasarian ang Digmang Bayan; Jun Lana – Big Night!; Lav Diaz – Historya ni Ha; Lawrence Fajardo – A Hard Day
Best Actor Pinakamahusay na Pangunahing Aktor	Best Actress Pinakamahusay na Pangunahing Aktres
**John Arcilla – On the Job: The Missing 8**; Christian Bables – Big Night!; Dingdong Dantes – A Hard Day; Francis Magundayao – Tenement 66; John Lloyd Cruz – Historya ni Ha; Paolo Contis – A Faraway Land; Shogen – Gensan Punch	**Yen Santos – A Faraway Land**; Charo Santos-Concio – Kun Maupay Man it Panahon; Donna Cariaga – Rabid; Elora Españo – Love and Pain in Between Refrains; Kim Molina – Ikaw at Ako ang Ending
Best Supporting Actor Pinakamahusay na Pangalawang Aktor	Best Supporting Actress Pinakamahusay na Pangalawang Aktres
**Dante Rivero – On the Job: The Missing 8**; Dennis Trillo – On the Job: The Missing 8; John Arcilla – A Hard Day; John Arcilla – Big Night!; Ronnie Lazaro – Gensan Punch; Sandino Martin – Walang Kasarian ang Digmang Bayan	**Lotlot de Leon – On the Job: The Missing 8**; Dolly de Leon – Historya ni Ha; Eugene Domingo – Big Night!; Jay Valencia Glorioso – Rabid; Mae Paner – Historya ni Ha; Shella Mae Romualdo – Arisaka
Best Screenplay Pinakamahusay na Dulang Pampelikula	Best Cinematography Pinakamahusay na Sinematograpiya
**On the Job: The Missing 8**; Big Night!; Historya ni Ha; Ikaw at Ako ang Ending; Kun Maupay Man it Panahon; Walang Kasarian ang Digmang Bayan	**Big Night!**; A Faraway Land; A Hard Day; Gensan Punch; Historya ni Ha; Kun Maupay Man it Panahon; On the Job: The Missing 8
Best Production Design Pinakamahusay na Disenyong Pamproduksyon	Best Editing Pinakamahusay na Editing
**Kun Maupay Man it Panahon**; A Hard Day; Big Night!; Gensan Punch; On the Job: The Missing 8	**On the Job: The Missing 8**; **Walang Kasarian ang Digmang Bayan**; Big Night!; Gensan Punch; Kun Maupay Man it Panahon; Resbak; Tenement 66
Best Music Pinakamahusay na Musika	Best Sound Pinakamahusay na Tunog
**On the Job: The Missing 8**; Gensan Punch; Kun Maupay Man it Panahon; Resbak; Walang Kasarian ang Digmang Bayan	**On the Job: The Missing 8**; A Hard Day; Gensan Punch; Kun Maupay Man it Panahon; Resbak; Tenement 66; Walang Kasarian ang Digmang Bayan
Best Short Film Pinakamahusay na Maikling Pelikula	Best Documentary Pinakamahusay na Dokyumentaryo
**Dandansoy**	**The Right to Life**

== Special Award ==
=== Natatanging Gawad Urian ===
- Roxlee (Roque Federizon Lee)

== Multiple nominations and awards ==
Films that received multiple nominations
Nominations	Films
12	On the Job: The Missing 8
9	Big Night!
9	Kun Maupay Man it Panahon
7	Gensan Punch
7	Historya ni Ha
7	Walang Kasarian ang Digmang Bayan
6	A Hard Day
3	A Faraway Land
3	Resbak
3	Tenement 66
2	Ikaw at Ako ang Ending
2	Rabid

Films that won multiple awards
Awards	Film
9	On the Job: The Missing 8
