= 2022 FAMAS Awards =

Annual Filipino film awards ceremony

70th FAMAS Awards
- Date: July 30, 2022
- Site: Metropolitan Theater, Manila

Highlights
- Best Picture: Katips
- Most awards: Katips (7)
- Most nominations: Katips (17)

The 70th Filipino Academy of Movie Arts and Sciences (FAMAS) Awards took place on July 30, 2022, at the Metropolitan Theater in Manila and honored the best Filipino films released in 2021.

This ceremony marks the first time that an acting award has gone to someone for a performance largely in a language other than English, Tagalog or Filipino. Charo Santos-Concio wins the Best Actress award for her role in Kun Maupay Man It Panahon, mainly speaking the Visayan language of Waray. This also marks her first win after five nominations, with her previous nomination in 1993 for Ms. Dolora X.

== Winners and nominees ==
=== Awards ===
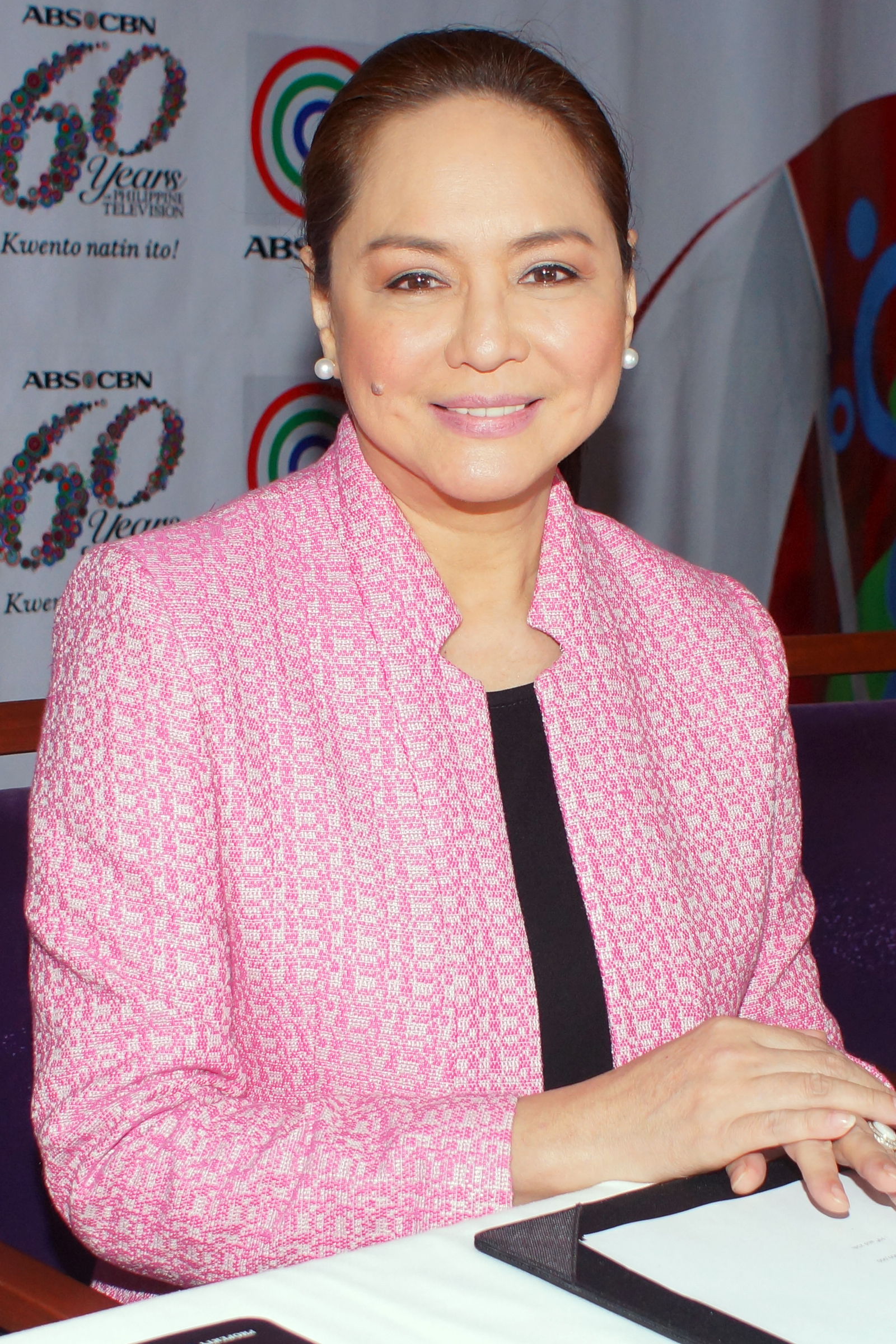
Charo Santos-Concio wins the Best Actress award for a Waray-language performance in Kun Maupay Man It Panahon.

Winners are listed first, highlighted in boldface.

**Best Picture**: **Katips**; A Hard Day; Arisaka; Big Night!; Kun Maupay Man It Panahon	**Best Director**: **Vince Tañada** **– Katips**; Carlo Francisco Manatad – Kun Maupay Man It Panahon; Jun Lana – Big Night!; Lawrence Fajardo – A Hard Day; Mikhail Red – Arisaka
**Best Actor**: **Vince Tañada – Katips as Panyong**; Christian Bables – Big Night! as Dharna / Panfilo Macaspac Jr.; Daniel Padilla – Kun Maupay Man It Panahon as Miguel; Dingdong Dantes – A Hard Day as Detective Edmund Villon; Jerome Ponce – Katips as Greg; Mon Confiado – Arisaka as Sonny	**Best Actress**: **Charo Santos-Concio – Kun Maupay Man It Panahon as Norma**; Janine Gutierrez – Dito at Doon as Len; Maja Salvador – Arisaka as Mariano; Nicole Laurel – Katips as Lara; Rita Daniela – Huling Ulan sa Tag-Araw as Luisa; Sharon Cuneta – Revirginized as Carmela
**Best Supporting Actor**: **Johnrey Rivas – Katips as Art**; John Arcilla – A Hard Day as Lieutenant Ace Franco; John Arcilla – Big Night! as Donato Rapido; Mon Confiado – Katips as Lieutenant Sales; Nico Antonio – Big Night! as Zues	**Best Supporting Actress**: **Janice de Belen – Big Night! as Melba**; Adelle Ibarrientos – Katips as Alet; Eugene Domingo – Big Night! as Madam; Luz Valdez – My Amanda as Inang; Rans Rifol – Kun Maupay Man It Panahon as Andrea; Shella Mae Romualdo – Arisaka as Nawi
**Best Screenplay**: **Jun Lana – Big Night!**; Angie de Ramos – Dok; Carlo Francisco Manatad, Jeremie Dubois & Giancarlo Abrahan – Kun Maupay Man It Panahon; Kristin Parreno Barrameda & Alexandra Gonzales – Dito at Doon; Melanie Honey Quino – Nelia; Vince Tanada – Katips	**Best Cinematography**: **Manuel Abanto – Katips**; Carlo Mendoza – Big Night!; Mycko David – Arisaka; Rodolfo Aves Jr. – A Hard Day; Teck Siang Lim – Kun Maupay Man It Panahon
**Best Visual Effects**: **Rommel Cello, Vincent Cheng, Roger Patanao, Marco Aguilar & Nerms Paborito – My Amanda**; John Joseph Tan – Katips; John Lavina, Edgery Mercado & Mark Victor – Arisaka; Ogie Tiglao – Kun Maupay Man It Panahon; Poli Gonzales, Gaspar Mangarin & Walter Monte – A Hard Day	**Best Editing**: **Lawrence Fajardo – A Hard Day**; Benjamin Gonzales Tolentino – Big Night!; Benjo Ferrer – Kun Maupay Man It Panahon; Joyce Bernal & Renard Torres – My Amanda; Mark Jason Sucgang – Katips
**Best Production Design**: **Whammy Alcazaren – Kun Maupay Man It Panahon**; Eero Yves Francisco – Arisaka; Maolen Fadul – Big Night!; Rolando Rubenecia – Katips	**Best Sound**: **Albert Michael Idioma, Alex Tomboc & Pietro Marco S. Javier – A Hard Day**; Dondon Mendoza – Katips; Immanuel Verona – Arisaka; Immanuel Verona – Big Night!; Roman Dymny – Kun Maupay Man It Panahon
**Best Original Song**: **"Sa Gitna ng Gulo" – Katips**; "Manhid" – Katips; "Nakikinig Ka Ba sa Akin?" – Dito at Doon; "Sa Susunod na Ikot ng Mundo" – Nelia; "Umulan Man o Umaraw" – Huling Ulan sa Tag-Araw	**Best Musical Score**: **Pipo Cifra – Katips**; Andrew Florentino – Kun Maupay Man It Panahon; Kettle Mata – My Amanda; Peter Legaste & Rephael Catap – A Hard Day; Teresa Barrozo – Big Night!
**Best Short Film**: **See You, George!**; Dog Eaters; Laro; Tukador ni Tatang; Write Here

== Special Honors ==
=== Angelo Eloy Padua Memorial Award for Journalism ===
Renz Spangler

=== Distinguished Student of the Art Award ===
Nora Aunor

Ricky Lee

=== Dr. Jose Perez Memorial Award ===
Raymond Lee

=== Exemplary Award on Public Service ===
Imee Marcos

=== FAMAS Hall of Fame ===
Allen Dizon

Jess Navarro

=== FAMAS Lifetime Achievement Award ===
Tessie Agana

=== Fernando Poe Jr. Memorial Award ===
Jinggoy Estrada

=== German Moreno Youth Achievement Award ===
Niana Guerrero

Ranz Kyle

=== Presidential Award ===
Patrick Michael Vargas

=== Public Service Award ===
Christopher De Venecia

=== Susan Roces Celebrity Award ===
Nora Aunor

== Stats ==
Movie	Nominations	Wins
Katips	17	7
Big Night!	13	2
Kun Maupay Man It Panahon	12	2
A Hard Day	9	2
Arisaka	9	0
My Amanda	4	1
Dito at Doon	3	0
Huling Ulan sa Tag-Araw	2	0
Nelia	2	0
Dok	1	0
Revirginized	1	0
