= 38th PMPC Star Awards for Movies =

2023 Philippine Movie Press Club awards

38th Star Awards for Movies
- Date: July 23, 2023
- Site: Manila Hotel, Manila City
- Hosted by: Claudine Barretto; Sunshine Cruz; Christian Bautista; Alfred Vargas

Highlights
- Best Picture: On the Job: The Missing 8 Katips (Indie)

The 38th PMPC Star Awards for Movies by the Philippine Movie Press Club (PMPC), honored the best Filipino films of 2021. The ceremony took place on July 23, 2023 in Centennial Hall of Manila Hotel, Manila City.

The PMPC Star Awards for Movies was hosted by Claudine Barretto, Sunshine Cruz, Christian Bautista and Alfred Vargas. On the Job: The Missing 8 won the top awards including Movie of the Year, Movie Ensemble Acting of the Year and Movie Director of the Year, while Katips won for Indie Movie of the Year, Indie Movie Ensemble Acting of the Year and Indie Movie Director of the Year.

== Winners and nominees ==
The following are the nominations for the 38th PMPC Star Awards for Movies, covering films released in 2021.

Winners are listed first and indicated in bold.

=== Major categories ===
Movie of the Year	Indie Movie of the Year
Winner: **"On the Job: The Missing 8"** (Reality MM Studios, Globe Studios, HBO Asia Originals); Resbak (Cignal Entertainment and Center Stage Productions): Big Night! (Cignal Entertainment, Quantum Films, IdeaFirst Company, October Train Films); Deception (Viva Films and Borracho Film Productions); Huling Ulan sa Tag-Araw (Heaven's Best Entertainment); Kun Maupay Man It Panahon (Black Sheep, iWantTFC, Globe Studios, Cinematografica, planc., Quantum Films, CMB Films, House on Fire, AAND Company, KawanKawan Media, Weydemann Bros.); My Amanda (Spring Films and AWOO)	Winner: **Katips** (PhilStagers Films): A Faraway Land (Mavx Productions); Arisaka (Ten17P Films); Gensan Punch (Center Stage Productions and Gentle Underground Monkeys); Historia ni Ha (Sine Olivia Pilipinas); Lockdown (For The Love of Art Films); Nelia (A and Q Production Films, Inc.)
Movie Ensemble Acting of the Year	Indie Movie Ensemble Acting of the Year
Winner: **The cast of On the Job: The Missing 8**: The cast of A Hard Day; The cast of Big Night!; The cast of Kun Maupay Man It Panahon; The cast of More Than Blue; The cast of My Husband, My Lover; The cast of Resbak	Winner: **The cast of Katips**: The cast of A Faraway Land; The cast of Arisaka; The cast of Gameboys: The Movie; The cast of Historia ni Ha; The cast of Lockdown; The cast of Versus
Movie Director of the Year	Indie Movie Director of the Year
Winner: **Erik Matti - On the Job: The Missing 8**: Alessandra De Rossi - My Amanda; Louie Ignacio - Huling Ulan sa Tag-Araw; Joel Lamangan - Deception; Jun Robles Lana - Big Night!; Carlo Francisco Manatad - Kun Maupay Man It Panahon; Brillante Mendoza - Resbak	Winner: **Vince Tañada - Katips**: Lav Diaz - Historia ni Ha; Lester Dimaranan - Nelia; Joel Lamangan - Lockdown; Brillante Mendoza - Gensan Punch; Mikhail Red - Arisaka; Veronica Velasco - A Faraway Land
Movie Actor of the Year	Movie Actress of the Year
Winner: **Vince Tañada - Katips**: John Arcilla - On the Job: The Missing 8; Christian Bables - Big Night!; John Lloyd Cruz - Historia ni Ha; Dingdong Dantes - A Hard Day; Paolo Gumabao - Lockdown; Daniel Padilla - Kun Maupay Man It Panahon; Piolo Pascual - My Amanda; JC Santos - More Than Blue; Dennis Trillo - On the Job: The Missing 8	Winner: Tied between **Charo Santos-Concio - Kun Maupay Man It Panahon** and **Sunshine Dizon - Versus**: Claudine Barretto Deception; Sharon Cuneta - Revirginized; Rita Daniela - Huling Ulan sa Tag-Araw; Alessandra De Rossi - My Amanda; Janine Gutierrez - Dito at Doon; Angelica Panganiban - Love or Money; Yassi Pressman - More Than Blue; Maja Salvador - Arisaka
Movie Supporting Actor of the Year	Movie Supporting Actress of the Year
Winner: **Johnrey Rivas - Katips**: John Arcilla - A Hard Day; Mon Confiado - Arisaka; Ricky Davao - Big Night!; Christopher de Leon - On the Job: The Missing 8; Ronnie Lazaro - Gensan Punch; Khalil Ramos - Resbak; Dante Rivero - On the Job: The Missing 8	Winner: **Janice De Belen - Big Night!** and **Lotlot De Leon - On the Job: The Missing 8**: Dolly de Leon - Historia ni Ha; Eugene Domingo - Big Night!; Dexter Doria - Memories of Forgetting; Ina Feleo - On the Job: The Missing 8; Chanda Romero - Deception; Ruby Ruiz - Lockdown
New Movie Actor of the Year	New Movie Actress of the Year
Winner: **Sean de Guzman - Anak ng Macho Dancer**: JC Alcantara - Hello Stranger: The Movie; Joaquin Domagoso - Caught in the Act; Marco Gomez - Silab; Rob Gomez - A Girl and a Guy; Miggy Jimenez - Gameboys: The Movie; Patrick Quiroz - Hello Stranger: The Movie; Kyle Velino - Gameboys: The Movie	Winner: **Quinn Carillo - Silab**: Andi Abaya - Caught in the Act; Cloe Barreto - Silab; Jhassy Busran - Caught in the Act; Angeli Khang - Mahjong Nights; Nicole Laurel Asensio - Katips; AJ Raval - Death of a Girlfriend; Rans Rifol - Kun Maupay Man It Panahon
Movie Child Performer of the Year
Winner: **Ella Ilano - The Housemaid**: Prinz Red Casiple - Silab; Yñigo Delen - Rabid ("HM" segment); Lhian Gimeno - A Hard Day; Jilliane Suen - Versus

=== Technical categories ===
Movie Original Screenplay of the Year	Indie Movie Original Screenplay of the Year
Winner: **Michiko Yamamoto - On the Job: The Missing 8**: Giancarlo Abrahan, Carlo Francisco Manatad, Jeremie Dubois - Kun Maupay Man It Panahon; Alessandra De Rossi - My Amanda; Troy Espiritu - Resbak; Easy Ferrer - Deception; Jun Robles Lana - Big Night!; Acy Ramos and Rich Mangubat-Lunasco - Huling Ulan sa Tag-Araw	Winner: **Lav Diaz - Historia ni Ha**: Honee Alipio - Gensan Punch; Troy Espiritu - Lockdown; Ralston Jover - Versus; Anton Santamaria - Arisaka; Vince Tañada - Katips; Veronica Velasco and Jinky Laurel - A Faraway Land
Movie Cinematographer of the Year	Indie Movie Cinematographer of the Year
Winner: **Teck Siang Lim - Kun Maupay Man It Panahon**: Neil Derrick Bion - On the Job: The Missing 8; Neil Derrick Bion - Rabid: Kami Lang Ba ang Pwedeng Malasin?; Carlo Canlas Mendoza - Big Night!; Carlos Montaño Jr. - Huling Ulan sa Tag-Araw; Joshua Reyles - Resbak; Boy Yñiguez - My Amanda	Winner: **Lav Diaz - Historia ni Ha**: Manuel Abanto - Katips; Mycko David - Arisaka; Gilbert Obispo and Journalie Payonan - Lockdown; Marvin Reyes - A Faraway Land; Joshua Reyles - Gensan Punch; Arvin Viola, Nix Bagaoisan, Onin Estrella, Kent Rustlee Flores, Manuel Garcellano - Memories of Forgetting
Movie Production Designer of the Year	Indie Movie Production Designer of the Year
Winner: **Whammy Alcazaren - Kun Maupay Man It Panahon**: Jay Custodio - Huling Ulan sa Tag-Araw; Marxie Maolen Fadul - Big Night!; Paul Infante - My Amanda; Dante Mendoza - Resbak; Ericson Navarro - Revirginized; Roma Regala and Michael Español - On the Job: The Missing 8	Winner: **Lav Diaz - Historia ni Ha**: Jay Custodio - Lockdown; Jay Custodio - Silab; Eero Yves Francisco - Arisaka; Erik Manalo - A Faraway Land; Dante Mendoza - Gensan Punch; Roland Rubenecia - Katips
Movie Editor of the Year	Indie Movie Editor of the Year
Winner: **Benjamin Tolentino - Big Night!**: Joyce Bernal and Renard Torres - My Amanda; Vanessa De Leon - Huling Ulan sa Tag-Araw; Diego Marx Dobles - Resbak; Benjo Ferrer - Kun Maupay Man It Panahon; Jay Halili - On the Job: The Missing 8; Marya Ignacio - Love or Money	Winner: **Armando Lao, Peter Arian Vito, Ysabelle Denoga - Gensan Punch**: Gilbert Obispo - Lockdown; Nikolas Red - Arisaka; Mark Jason Sugcang - Katips; Benjamin Tolentino - Gameboys: The Movie; Noah Tonga - A Faraway Land; Renard Torres - Dito at Doon
Movie Musical Scorer of the Year	Indie Movie Musical Scorer of the Year
Winner: **The Storyteller Project - My Amanda**: Teresa Barrozo - Big Night!; Diwa De Leon - Resbak; Von De Guzman - Deception; Andrew Florentino - Kun Maupay Man It Panahon; Dek Margaja - Huling Ulan sa Tag-Araw; Erwin Romulo, Malek Lopez, Arvin Nogueras - On the Job: The Missing 8	Winner: **Pipo Cifra - Katips**: Von De Guzman - Nelia; Diwa De Leon - Gensan Punch; Jessie Lasaten - A Faraway Land; Myka Magsaysay-Sigua and Paul Sigua - Arisaka; Jerrold Tarog - Dito at Doon; Emerzon Texon - Gameboys: The Movie
Movie Sound Engineer of the Year	Indie Movie Sound Engineer of the Year
Winner: **Corinne de San Jose - On the Job: The Missing 8**: Lamberto Casas Jr. and Pietro Marco Javier - Rabid: Kami Lang Ba ang Pwedeng Malasin?; Jedd Dumaguina - Resbak; Roman Dymny - Kun Maupay Man It Panahon; Allen Roy Santos - My Amanda; Alex Tomboc and Aian Caro - Huling Ulan sa Tag-Araw; Immanuel Verona - Big Night!	Winner: **Albert Michael Idioma - Gensan Punch**: Cecil Buban - Historia ni Ha; Sergei Groshev - A Faraway Land; Christopher Mendoza - Nelia; Dondon Mendoza - Katips; Fatima Nerikka Salim and Immanuel Verona - Arisaka; Roy Santos - Gameboys: The Movie
Movie Original Theme Song of the Year	Indie Movie Original Theme Song of the Year
Winner: "**Umulan Man O Umaraw**" performed by Rita Daniela, composed by Louie Ignacio, arranged by Bobby Velasco (Huling Ulan sa Tag-Araw): "Deception" performed by Nicole Omillo, composed by Ferdie Topacio, arranged by Ricky Gonzales (Deception); "Ito ang Resbak" performed and composed by Rusty Loayon, arranged by Diwa De Leon (Resbak); "Maghihintay" performed and composed by Marion Aunor, arranged by Cool Cat Ash (More Than Blue)	Winner: "**Sa Susunod Na Ikot ng Mundo**" performed by Kris Lawrence, with saxophone solo by Nicole Reluya, composed and arranged by Von De Guzman (Nelia): "Sa Gitna ng Gulo" performed by Jerome Ponce, Nicole Laurel Asensio, Vince Tañada, Adelle Ibarrientos, Joshua Bulot, Vean Olmedo, Johnrey Rivas, and Carla Lim; lyrics by Vince Tañada, composed by Pipo Cifra (Katips); "Sigaw" performed by Joshua Ronett, composed by Emerzon Texon and Elmer Gatchalian, arranged by Emerzon Texon (Gameboys: The Movie); "Sundan Mo" performed and composed by Ron Solis, arranged by Jonathan Manalo (Lockdown); "Tanging Hiling" performed by Andi Abaya, music and lyrics by Henry Ong, arranged by Alvin Barcelona, Jeric Mison, and Mike Nuez (Caught in the Act)

=== Short films ===
Short Film Movie of the Year	Short Film Movie Director of the Year
Winner: **Black Rainbow** (Sinehalaga, NCCA, Negros Cultural Foundation, Uncle Scott Global Productions): Bakit Ako Sinusundan ng Buwan? (Sinehalaga, NCCA, Negros Cultural Foundation, Red Room Media Productions); Dayas (Sine Cordillera Films and Be Unrivaled Productions); Hadlok (Sinehalaga, NCCA, Negros Cultural Foundation, Pelikula Productions); I Get So Sad Sometimes (QCinema, Project 8 Projects, Blackout Studios, and Quezon City Film Development Commission; Kids on Fire (Screen Asia); Lorna (Sinehalaga, NCCA, Negros Cultural Foundation, All Blacks Media); Pugon (Rems Films); The Dust in Your Place (Cutaway Productions)	Winner: **Zig Dulay - Black Rainbow**: Noel Escondo - Lorna; Jianlin Floresca - Dayas; Ralston Jover - Hadlok; Richard Soriano Legaspi - Bakit Ako Sinusundan ng Buwan?; Kyle Nieva - Kids on Fire; David Olson - The Dust in Your Place; Trishtan Perez - I Get So Sad Sometimes; Gabby Ramos - Pugon

=== Special awards ===
Darling of the Press	Movie Loveteam of the Year
Darling of the Press Winner: **Alfred Vargas**: Gretchen Barretto; Christian Bautista; Mayor Joy Belmonte; Liza Diño-Seguerra; Niño Muhlach; Piolo Pascual; Alden Richards	Movie Loveteam of the Year Winner: **Donny Pangilinan and Belle Mariano - Love Is Color Blind**: Ken Chan and Rita Daniela - Huling Ulan sa Tag-Araw; Jeremiah Lisbo and Kaori Oinuma - Love at First Stream; Andi Abaya and Joaquin Domagoso - Caught in the Act; JC Santos and Yassi Pressman - More Than Blue; Paolo Contis and Yen Santos - A Faraway Land; JC Santos and Janine Gutierrez - Dito at Doon

- Nora Aunor Ulirang Artista Lifetime Achievement Award - **Helen Gamboa**
- Ulirang Alagad ng Pelikula sa Likod ng Kamera Lifetime Achievement Award - **Director Chito Roño**
