= Fuchsia Libre =

- Theatrical release poster
- Directed by: RC Delos Reyes
- Starring: Paolo Contis; John Arcilla
- Production company: Mavx Productions
- Release date: May 15, 2024
- Running time: 112 minutes
- Country: Philippines
- Language: Filipino

Fuchsia Libre is a 2024 Philippine action comedy film directed by RC Delos Reyes starring Paolo Contis and John Arcilla.

== Plot ==
Oliver lives with his widowed father Danilo, a police officer. He takes a passion in martial arts while hiding his gay identity from his father while growing up. However, he is eventually discovered making out with his boyfriend and is publicly assaulted by his father. The incident is witnessed by Danilo's superior, leading to him being dismissed from service. Oliver moves out and spends the next ten years running a gym with his gay colleagues under the name Keon. Throughout this period, Oliver tries to reconcile with Danilo, who dismisses him.

One day, Oliver's landlord advises him that he is selling the property on which the former's gym stands but offers to sell it to him for five million pesos. After Danilo rejects Oliver's request to lend him the money, the latter receives a tip from his best friend Daddy Yo about a job offer in a secret location. Arriving at the venue, the two stumble upon an underground fight club run by syndicate leader Patron. Desperate, Oliver participates in a match but chooses to wear a mask after finding Danilo beside Patron, unaware that Danilo had feigned the dismissal and is working as an undercover agent trying to bring down Patron. Despite losing, Oliver, who takes on the persona Fuchsia Libre, catches the attention of both Patron and Danilo, who adopts Fuchsia Libre as a sponsor without knowing that he is his son.

Fuchsia Libre's appearances inspire Patron to require all participants to wear masks in future matches and kill those who refuse to in a sadistic manner. Fuchsia Libre goes on to win his succeeding matches and raise funds towards buying the gym location, while Danilo continues to provide him support, knowing that Fuchsia's success has brought in more profits to Patron and would bring him closer into infiltrating the latter's inner circle. During a visit to Danilo, Oliver confesses to his father that he is Fuchsia Libre, but Danilo continues to be dismissive of him, saying that it was a mistake having a gay son and warning him not to go to his final match against Patron's most formidable fighter, Eskrimador. A disappointed Oliver walks away but decides to compete in the match.

At the ring, Fuchsia Libre's delayed arrival allows Danilo to hack into Patron's computer and download incriminating information against him. Fuchsia manages to make it to his fight but is badly mauled by Eskrimador, who removes both of their masks. As Danilo tries to escape, he ignores his son but has a change of heart and triggers a fire alarm that halts the match, causing the audience to flee. Danilo knocks down Eskrimador with a chair and helps Fuchsia escape along with Daddy Yo. On their way out, they are intercepted by Eskrimador, but Daddy Yo stays behind to fight him successfully before being taken hostage by Patron and his men. Danilo calls for backup while revealing his true identity to Oliver and apologising for his treatment of him. Patron demands that Danilo and Fuchsia come out, but the latter inspires his father to fight back, resulting in a fracas that eliminates most of Patron's men. However, Patron shoots Fuchsia and is in turn shot by Danilo.

Oliver recovers from his injuries while Patron is arrested. As Oliver reconciles with his father, he reveals that he kept on fighting in the ring not only to save his gym but also to realize his father's happiness at seeing him excel in life. As Danilo leaves for an errand, Daddy Yo and the gym crew arrive to celebrate Keon's recovery.

== Cast ==
=== Main ===
- Paolo Contis as Oliver Malvar/Keon/Fuchsia Libre
- John Arcilla as Danilo Malvar

=== Supporting ===
- Khalil Ramos as Hernan "Patron" Vargas
- Jon Santos as Lola Babes
- Gian Magdangal as Daddy Yo
- Jett Pangan as Raymond Crisologo
- Ian Ignacio as Roman "Eskrimador" Santiago
- Monsour del Rosario as Supremo
