= A Gentle Night =

- Poster
- Chinese: 小城二月
- Directed by: Qiu Yang
- Screenplay by: Qiu Yang
- Starring: Li Shuxian
- Cinematography: Constanze Schmitt
- Edited by: Carlo Francisco Manatad
- Release date: 27 May 2017 (Cannes)
- Running time: 15 minutes
- Country: China

A Gentle Night (小城二月 Xiao Cheng Er Yue) is a 2017 Chinese short film written and directed by Qiu Yang. It won the Short Film Palme d'Or at the 2017 Cannes Film Festival.

== Plot ==
In a nameless small Chinese city, a distressed mother desperately tries to find her missing teenaged daughter throughout the night

The film is set in Changzhou, Jiangsu, China.

== Cast ==
- Li Shuxian as Cai Zhuo

== Reception ==
The film won the Short Film Palme d'Or at the 2017 Cannes Film Festival, and received an honorable mention for the Best International Short Film award at the 2017 Toronto International Film Festival.
