= Huwag Kang Lalabas =

- Theatrical release poster
- Directed by: Adolfo Alix Jr.
- Screenplay by: Jerry Gracio
- Story by: Adolfo Alix Jr. Jerry Gracio
- Produced by: Enrico A. Roque
- Starring: Beauty Gonzalez; Aiko Melendez; Kim Chiu
- Cinematography: T.M. Malones
- Edited by: Aleksandr Castaneda
- Music by: Mikoy Morales
- Production companies: Obra Cinema; Cineko Productions
- Distributed by: Axinite Digicinema
- Release date: December 25, 2021
- Running time: 127 minutes
- Country: Philippines
- Language: Filipino

Huwag Kang Lalabas (lit. 'Don't Go Out') is a 2021 Philippine horror anthology film directed by Adolfo Alix Jr. under Obra Cinema and Cineko Productions.

== Synopsis ==
=== Kumbento ===
"Kumbento" revolves around nuns in a haunted convent during World War II.

=== Bahay ===
In 1974, uncircumcised boys are killed by a monster at night by the river under mysterious circumstances. A mother (Aiko Melendez) is anxious about getting her teenaged son (Joaquin Domagoso) circumcised through a traditional ritual conducted in a riverbank which could save him from death.

=== Hotel ===
A returning Overseas Filipino Worker (Kim Chiu) from Japan returns to the Philippines amidst the COVID-19 pandemic, bringing home with her a memento. She stays in a hotel in Baguio due to mandatory quarantine protocols. There, she meets an old man who warns her about the facility she and other returning migrant workers are staying. A few days into the quarantine, some of them test positive for COVID-19 and undergo isolation.

== Cast ==
Kumbento

- Beauty Gonzalez as Teresa
- Elizabeth Oropesa as Fides
- Yasser Marta as Lucas
- Matet de Leon as Rosa
- Tanya Gomez as Feliza
- Marcus Madrigal as Arnulfo

| class="col-break col-break-2" |

Bahay

- Aiko Melendez as Espie
- Joaquin Domagoso as Buboy
- James Blanco as Berting
- Bembol Roco as Mandurugo
- Dave Bornea as Nano
- Ayeesha Cervantes as Pipay
- Soliman Cruz as Tasyo

Hotel

- Kim Chiu as Amor
- Jameson Blake as Jeric
- Tina Paner as Patring
- Brenda Mage as Bini
- Donna Carriaga as Daday
- Rico Barrera as Hotel Personnel
- Allan Paule as Buboy

== Production ==
Huwag Kang Lalabas was produced under Obra Cinema and Cineko Productions with Adolfo Alix Jr. as its director. It is an anthology film with three parts based on folklore and urban legends namely "Kumbento", "Bahay", and "Hotel". Principal photography for "Kumbento" and "Hotel" took place in Baguio while "Bahay" was filmed in San Jose del Monte, Bulacan in the middle of the COVID-19 pandemic. Filming wrapped up in Baguio on July 1, 2021. The title of the film according to Alix came from star actress Kim Chiu quote "Huwag kang lalabas" (lit. 'don't go out') in reference to the COVID-19 lockdowns in 2020.

== Release ==
Huwag Kang Lalabas will be released in the Philippines on December 25, 2021, as one of the official entries of the 2021 Metro Manila Film Festival.
