= History of Ha =

2021 Philippine film

- Release movie poster
- Directed by: Lav Diaz
- Written by: Lav Diaz
- Starring: John Lloyd Cruz
- Cinematography: Lav Diaz
- Edited by: Lav Diaz
- Production company: Sine Olivia Pilipinas
- Release date: October 12, 2021 (London)
- Running time: 276 minutes
- Country: Philippines
- Languages: Filipino; English

History of Ha (Filipino: Historya ni Ha) is a 2021 Philippine historical drama film written, directed, and edited by Lav Diaz. It premiered at the BFI London Film Festival on October 12, 2021 as part of the Dare section. It earned seven nominations at the 2022 Gawad Urian Awards including Best Film, Best Actor, and Best Direction. The Young Critics' Circle awarded it Best Picture for 2021 and Best Actor for John Lloyd Cruz.

== Premise ==
Hernando Alamada realizes the Philippines is experiencing a bitter transition yet again after the president, Ramon Magsaysay, unexpectedly dies in a plane crash. Alamada treads on an aimless journey and descends into absurd madness before finding redemption.

== Cast ==
- John Lloyd Cruz as Hernando Alamada, a vaudeville great and a former socialist cadre
- Ha as himself
- Teroy Guzman as Among Guzman
- Mae Paner as Sister Lorenza
- Dolly de Leon as Dahlia, an aging sex worker
- Jonathan Francisco as Joselito
- Hazel Orencio as Matilde
- Earl Ignacio as Earnesto Guevara
- Eliezl Gabuco as Hernanda
- Jun Sabayton as Congressman Torres

== Production and release ==
The film was shot in black-and-white and was shot in Sibaltan, Palawan, in 2019. The town's residents were also included in the cast. History of Ha was planned to premiere in the 2020 Locarno Film Festival, but it was not screened in that year and in 2021. It was also screened in the 2021 QCinema International Film Festival.

== Reception ==
ABS-CBN's Fred Hawson described the film as a black comedy with a steady pace in storytelling and commended its cast for acting "physically-demanding" and "dangerous" scenes such as walking on mountain paths during rainfall. The film is "rich in political discourse" and multi-layered as it discusses a ventroquilist's context in a post-vaudeville era and serves as a cautionary tale for The Philippine Star's Juaniyo Arcellana.
