= 2021 Metro Manila Film Festival =

Annual Philippine Festival edition

2021 Metro Manila Film Festival 47th Metro Manila Film Festival
- Awards: Gabi ng Parangal (transl. Awards Night)
- No. of films: 8
- Festival date: December 25, 2021 to January 7, 2022

MMFF chronology
- 48th ed. 46th ed.

The 2021 Metro Manila Film Festival (MMFF) is the 47th edition of the annual Metro Manila Film Festival. It is organized by the Metropolitan Manila Development Authority (MMDA). It was the second of the two editions to be held during the COVID-19 pandemic in the Philippines.

== Impact of the COVID-19 pandemic ==
The 2021 film festival was held to live audiences in cinemas after level alert measures in the Philippines were relaxed. Entries in the 2020 edition were made available through online streaming since cinemas were closed and not allowed to operate (with the exception of select cinemas in areas on Level 3).

Only around 300 movie theaters were allowed to screen, down from the usual 900. Many cinemas were left deteriorated due to being unused for the past two years due to the pandemic-related closures. Theaters were only allowed to operate at 50 percent capacity with only those vaccinated allowed to be admitted and food and drinks are prohibited (on Alert Level 2 and 3 areas) This is compounded by the impact of Typhoon Rai (Odette) which caused major power disruption in the Visayas and Mindanao areas.

== Entries ==
=== Feature films ===
The number of entries for the Metro Manila Film Festival returned to eight for the 2021 edition. Unlike the previous edition, the number of entries were temporarily expanded to ten since the 2020 edition was held virtually. The deadline for entries was set on October 31, 2021. There were 19 film submissions. The eight entries were announced on November 12, 2021.

Title	Starring	Production company	Director	Genre
A Hard Day	Dingdong Dantes, John Arcilla	Viva Films and AgostoDos Pictures	Lawrence Fajardo	Action
Big Night!	Christian Bables	Cignal Entertainment, The IdeaFirst Company, Octobertrain Films, Quantum Films	Jun Lana	Black Comedy
Huling Ulan sa Tag-Araw	Rita Daniela, Ken Chan	Heaven's Best Entertainment	Louie Ignacio	Romance, Comedy
Huwag Kang Lalabas	Kim Chiu, Aiko Melendez, Beauty Gonzalez	Obra Cinema, Cineko Productions	Adolfo Alix Jr.	Horror, Anthology
Kun Maupay Man it Panahon	Charo Santos-Concio, Daniel Padilla, Rans Rifol	Globe Studios, Black Sheep Productions, Dreamscape Entertainment	Carlo Francisco Manatad	Drama
Love at First Stream	Kaori Oinuma, Jeremiah Lisbo, Daniela Stranner, Anthony Jennings	ABS-CBN Film Productions	Cathy Garcia-Molina	Romantic, Comedy
Nelia	Winwyn Marquez, Raymond Bagatsing, Ali Forbes	A and Q Production Films	Lester Dimaranan	Suspense, Drama
The Exorsis	Toni Gonzaga, Alex Gonzaga	TINCAN, Viva Films	Fifth Solomon	Horror, Comedy

=== Short films ===
The MMFF, in partnership with Meta Philippines, launched the Facebook Creator Exhibition. Five short films by content creators, produced with the theme "lockdown", was made available for streaming on Facebook under the exhibition.

Title	Content creator
Let It Simmer	Erwan Heussaff / The Fat Kid Inside Studios / FEATR.
Kandado (transl. Locked)	Pio Balbuena
Dito Ka Lang (transl. Stay here)	Beverly Cumla
Then and Now	Discover MNL
Pepe sa Lockdown (transl. Pepe in Lockdown)	Rayn Brizuela / PGAG

== Parade of Stars ==
The Parade of Stars for the 2021 MMFF is a fluvial parade instead of the traditional motorcade; which is a first in the history of the film festival. Consequentially, ferry boats were used instead of floats on land-based motor vehicles. The event was held on December 19, 2021, despite rainy weather. The route covered the Pasig River and the cities of Makati and Pasig. This was done as a means to promote the Pasig River Ferry Service, which is operated by the Metropolitan Manila Development Authority (MMDA).

== Awards ==
2021 Metro Manila Film Festival Gabi ng Parangal
- Date: December 27, 2021
- Site: Samsung Hall, SM Aura Premier, Taguig
- Hosted by: Giselle Sanchez

Highlights
- Best Picture: Big Night!
- Best Director: Jun Lana (Big Night!)
- Best Actor: Christian Bables (Big Night!)
- Best Actress: Charo Santos-Concio (Kun Maupay Man it Panahon)
- Most awards: Big Night! (8)

The Gabi ng Parangal (transl. Awards Night) of the 2021 Metro Manila Film Festival was held at the Samsung Hall of the SM Aura Premier in Taguig on December 27, 2021. The awards night was hosted by Giselle Sanchez.

The jury includes Manet Dayrit, Congresswoman Aloy Lim, and Senator Bong Go.

=== Major awards ===
Winners are listed first, highlighted in boldface, and indicated with a double dagger (‡). Nominations are also listed if applicable.

Best Picture	Best Director
**Big Night! – Cignal Entertainment, The IdeaFirst Company**‡; Kun Maupay Man it Panahon – Globe Studios, Black Sheep Productions (2nd Best Picture); A Hard Day – Viva Films (3rd Best Picture)	**Jun Lana – Big Night!**‡; Carlo Francisco Manatad – Kun Maupay Man it Panahon; Lawrence Fajardo – A Hard Day
Best Actor	Best Actress
**Christian Bables – Big Night!**‡; Daniel Padilla – Kun Maupay Man it Panahon; Dingdong Dantes – A Hard Day	**Charo Santos-Concio – Kun Maupay Man it Panahon**‡; Daniela Stranner – Love at First Stream; Alex Gonzaga – The Exorsis; Elizabeth Oropesa – Huwag Kang Lalabas
Best Supporting Actor	Best Supporting Actress
**John Arcilla – Big Night!**‡; John Arcilla – A Hard Day; Nico Antonio – Big Night!	**Rans Rifol – Kun Maupay Man it Panahon**‡; Eugene Domingo – Big Night!; Janice de Belen – Big Night!
Best Screenplay	Best Cinematography
**Jun Lana – Big Night!**‡	**Carlo Mendoza – Big Night!**‡; Jun Aves – A Hard Day; Teck Siang Lim – Kun Maupay Man it Panahon
Best Production Design	Best Editing
**Juan Manuel Alcazaren – Kun Maupay Man it Panahon**‡; Maolen Fadul – Big Night!; Norico Santos – Love at First Stream	**Lawrence Fajardo – A Hard Day**‡; Benjamin Tolentino – Big Night!; Marya Ignacio – Love at First Stream
Best Sound	Best Original Theme Song
**Albert Michael Idioma – A Hard Day**‡; Emmanuel Verona – Big Night!; Roman Dymny – Kun Maupay Man it Panahon	**"Umulan Man O Umaraw" from Huling Ulan sa Tag-Araw – Written by Louie Ignacio**‡; "Huwag Kang Lalabas" from Huwag Kang Lalabas – Written by Bryan Lao; "No Stopping You" from Love at First Stream – Written by SB19; "Sa Susunod na Ikot ng Mundo" from Nelia – Written by Kris Lawrence
Best Musical Score	Best Visual Effects
**Teresa Barrozo – Big Night!**‡; Peter Legaste and Raphael Catap – A Hard Day; Andrew Florentino – Kun Maupay Man it Panahon	**Ogie Tiglao – Kun Maupay Man it Panahon**‡; Nickl Entertainment Corporation – Love at First Stream
Best Float	Gatpuno Antonio J. Villegas Cultural Award
**Huwag Kang Lalabas**‡; Big Night!; Nelia	**Kun Maupay Man it Panahon**‡
Fernando Poe Jr. Memorial Award for Excellence	Special Jury Prize
**A Hard Day**‡	**Daniel Padilla – Kun Maupay Man it Panahon**‡
Gender Sensitivity Award
**Big Night!**‡; The Exorsis; Kun Maupay Man it Panahon

==== Other awards ====
- Natatanging Gawad MMFF – Danilo Lim and Bienvenido Lumbera
- Manay Ichu Vera-Perez Maceda Memorial Award – Rosa Rosal

=== Short Film category ===
- Special Jury Prize – **Kandado** of **Pio Balbuena**

=== Multiple awards ===
Awards	Film
8	Big Night!
7	Kun Maupay Man it Panahon
4	A Hard Day

=== Multiple nominations ===
Nominations	Film
15	Big Night!
13	Kun Maupay Man it Panahon
9	A Hard Day
6	Love at First Stream (Note: The film was also nominated for the Best Picture.)
3	Huwag Kang Lalabas
2	The Exorsis
2	Nelia

== Box office gross ==
No official figures have been released. MMFF spokesperson Noel Ferrer dispute claims that the 2021 MMFF has underperformed box office due to rise of COVID-19, the limit of age, the controversy by the delaying of big blockbusters with Spider-Man: No Way Home, the lackluster of strategy, the higher price ticket, and looking for child-friendly films citing that the opening day of 2021 MMFF earned a third of the total box office gross of the online 2020 MMFF edition. He claimed that the film festival entries were able to surpass the Philippine domestic gross of Hollywood films such as Eternals and the No Time to Die. By December 29, Ferrer said that the box office gross of the 2021 MMFF has already surpassed the earnings of the previous edition. Ferrer stated the earnings of the 2020 MMFF to be less than ₱50 million.

== Notes ==
Preceded by 2020 Metro Manila Film Festival	Metro Manila Film Festival; 2021	Succeeded by 2022 Metro Manila Film Festival
