= The Exorsis =

- Theatrical release poster
- Directed by: Fifth Solomon
- Based on: The Exorcist
- Starring: Alex Gonzaga; Toni Gonzaga
- Production company: TinCan Productions
- Distributed by: Viva Films
- Release date: December 25, 2021
- Country: Philippines
- Language: Filipino

The Exorsis (stylized as The ExorSis) is a 2021 Philippine horror comedy film directed by Fifth Solomon and co-produced by Viva Films and TinCan Productions. It is a parody based on The Exorcist. The movie starring Toni Gonzaga and Alex Gonzaga. This marks Toni and Alex's second Metro Manila Film Festival after Mary, Marry Me which is an entry of the 2018 Metro Manila Film Festival.

== Cast ==
- Alex Gonzaga as Daniella "Dani" Raymundo Morales
- Toni Gonzaga as Gina Raymundo Morales
- Melai Cantiveros as Jessa Mae
- Tess Antonio as MJ
- Skusta Clee as himself
- Kween Leng Leng as LengLeng "Leng" Delos Santos
- Isay Alvarez as Gina and Dani's mother
- Dennis Padilla as Gina and Dani's father

== Production ==
The Exorsis is a co-production by Viva Films and TinCan Productions with Fifth Solomon as its director. TinCan Productions is associated with Toni Gonzaga. The film project associated with Exorsis was realized in November 2019 when actress Alex Gonzaga suggested Solomon to direct a film that would feature her and her sister Toni. Solomon began writing the script, which was originally intended to be purely comedy, during the early phase of the COVID-19 pandemic. The director decided to make a horror film instead, to limit the number of people and filming locations needed. He later shifted the script to a horror-comedy conceding that the horror genre is not his forte. The Gonzaga sisters were credited for providing the comedic elements to the film with Solomon adding that he shares "a similar sense of humor" with the siblings.

Principal photography took place in 2020 around the time when COVID-19 community quarantine measures were relaxed somewhat.

== Release ==
The Exorsis was released in the Philippines on December 25, 2021, as one of the official entries of the 2021 Metro Manila Film Festival. It was previous set for 2020 Metro Manila Film Festival
