= Nelia (film) =

- Theatrical release poster
- Directed by: Lester Dimaranan
- Screenplay by: Melanie "Honey" Quiño
- Produced by: Melanie "Honey" Quiño
- Starring: Winwyn Marquez
- Cinematography: Paolo Magsino
- Edited by: Mai Calapardo
- Music by: Von de Guzman
- Production companies: A&Q Films
- Distributed by: A&Q Films
- Release date: 25 December 2021
- Running time: 100 minutes
- Country: Philippines
- Language: Filipino

Nelia is a 2021 Philippine thriller film directed by Lester Dimaranan. The film stars Winwyn Marquez in the title role. It was one of the entries in the 2021 Metro Manila Film Festival.

The film is streaming online on YouTube.

== Premise ==
A nurse attempts to uncover information about the mysterious deaths of patients in Room 009 in a hospital.

== Cast ==
- Winwyn Marquez as Nelia
- Raymond Bagatsing as Dr. Rey
- Mon Confiado as Col. Blancaflor
- Ali Forbes as Ana
- Lloyd Samartino as General
- Shido Roxas as Dr. Josan
- Dexter Doria as Mrs. Veron
- Dan Alvaro as Mr. Veron
- Juan Carlos Galano as Jeff
- Aldwin Alegre as General's Boss
- Sarah Javier as Ms. Josie
- April Anne Dolot as Kathy
- Massey Shamsoddin as Maymay
- Red Atienza as Marco
- Jan Raphael Salud as Hospital Atty.
- Ellen Ilagan as Head Nurse

== Production ==
Producer and screenwriter Melanie Honey Quiño wrote the screenplay for Nelia in the mid-2000s, when she was still a student.

A and Q originally intended to produce educational films but these plans were cancelled because of the COVID-19 pandemic. Instead, the production studio pursued making Nelia to help film industry workers who were greatly impacted by the pandemic. While A and Q presented the film in honor of medical frontliners, it insisted that the fact the film's fictional story featuring medical workers was merely coincidental. Aside from centering on doctors and nurses, the film also touched upon mental health. For this purpose, the production team consulted with psychiatrists on relevant subject matters such as schizophrenia. Co-producer and screenwriter Quiño hoped that it would encourage people to seek professional help when it comes to mental health issues. Filming took place in Gapan, Nueva Ecija.

== Release ==
Nelia was released in the Philippines on December 25, 2021, as one of the official entries of the 2021 Metro Manila Film Festival. A film company based in Los Angeles, California has expressed interest to secure distribution rights for Nelia in the United States.

== Possible remake ==
Two South Korean production companies have expressed intent to create a film adaptation of Nelia.
