= Yen Santos =

Filipino actress

- Born: Lilieyen Santos; November 20, 1992 (age 33); Cabanatuan, Nueva Ecija, Philippines
- Occupations: Actress, singer, endorser
- Years active: 2010–present
- Agent: Star Magic (2010–present)

Lilieyen Santos (born November 20, 1992), professionally known as Yen Santos, is a Filipino actress who debuted on the reality show Pinoy Big Brother Teen Clash 2010. She gained mainstream recognition in the Philippine television drama series Pure Love, an adaptation of the South Korean television drama series 49 Days.

Santos won the Best Actress award at the Gawad Urian Awards 2022 for the Filipino film A Faraway Land.

== Personal life ==
Santos was born and raised in Cabanatuan. In 2010, she was one of the Housemates on Pinoy Big Brother: Teen Clash 2010, where she was evicted on Day 43.

She was in a relationship with A Faraway Land co-star Paolo Contis. They later broke up in 2024.

== Filmography ==
=== Film ===
Year	Title	Role
2017	Northern Lights: A Journey to Love	Angel
2019	Two Love You	Emma
2021	A Faraway Land	Mahjoy Garðalið

=== Television ===
Year	Title	Role	Notes
2010	Pinoy Big Brother: Teen Clash 2010	Herself	Housemate
2010	Shoutout!	Herself	Host
2011	Gandang Gabi Vice	Herself	Guest
2011	Wansapanataym	Lucy	Episode: "Darmo Adarna"
2011	Good Vibes	Dayanara "Ara" Gonzales	Main role
2011	Mutya	Melinda	Supporting role
2011	Maalaala Mo Kaya	Arlyn	Episode: "Sulat"
2011–2012	Growing Up	Cassandra "Cassie" Soriano	Main role
2011–2012	Ikaw ay Pag-Ibig	Michelle Alvarez	Supporting role
2012	E-Boy	young Carla Mariano	Special participation
2012	Oka2kat	Kimana	Guest
2012	Wansapanataym	Doll House Yaya	Episode: "Doll House"
2012	Maalaala Mo Kaya	Lyn	Episode: "Cellphone"
2012	Maalaala Mo Kaya	Gemma	Episode: "Lubid"
2012	Precious Hearts Romances Presents: Pintada	Samantha Diño	Supporting role
2013	Maalaala Mo Kaya	Malou	Episode: "Sanggol"
2013	Wansapanataym	young Miss Laiz	Episode: "Teacher's Pest"
2013	Maalaala Mo Kaya	Joan Panopio	Episode: "Telebisyon"
2013	Dugong Buhay	young Isabel de Lara	Special participation
2014	Maalaala Mo Kaya	Kaye Mercado	Episode: "Notebook"
2014	Pure Love	Ysabel Espiritu / Danica Santos	Main role
2014	Maalaala Mo Kaya	Joanna	Episode: "Liham"
2014–2015	Dream Dad	Maribeth "Bebet" Morales	Supporting role
2015	Oh My G!	Anne Reyes / Sister Marie Paul Cepeda	Supporting role
2015	Tonight with Boy Abunda	Herself	Guest
2015–2016	All of Me	Lena Dimaculangan-Figueras	Main role
2016	Ipaglaban Mo!	Libay	Episode: "OFW"
2016	Magpahanggang Wakas	Clarissa "Issa" Ordoñez	Supporting role
2017	It's Showtime	Herself	Guest (with Piolo Pascual)
2017	Banana Split Extra Scoop	Herself / Guest	Various roles
2017	Goin' Bulilit	Herself	Guest
2017	Wildflower	Rosana "Ana" Navarro	Supporting role
2017	Ipaglaban Mo!	Zoe Vargas	Episode: "Pasaway"
2017	Dok, Ricky Pedia	Teacher Julia	Main role
2018–2019	Halik	Jacqueline "Jacky" Montefalco-Corpuz	Main role
2019	Maalaala Mo Kaya	Rodelyn	Episode: "Dyip"
2019	Ipaglaban Mo!	Grace	Episode: "Paninira"
2026	The Loyalty Game	Diane Martinez	

=== Microdramas ===
Year	Title	Role	Notes
2026	Twist of Fate	Ginny Rodriguez	

== Awards and recognitions ==
Year	Award giving body	Category	Nominated work	Result	Ref.
2022	45th Gawad Urian Awards	Pinakamahusay na Aktres (Best Actress)	A Faraway Land	Won	

=== Listicles ===
Year	Magazine	Award
2011	Yes! Magazine	Included in 100 Most Beautiful Stars
2011	Yes! Magazine	Included in The Yes! List - The Next Big Thing
