= Rans Rifol =

Filipino singer and actress (born 2001)

- Born: Francinne Roy Rifol; October 18, 2001 (age 24); Meycauayan, Bulacan, Philippines
- Genres: P-Pop, teen pop, Bubblegum pop
- Occupations: Singer; actress
- Years active: 2016–present
- Labels: Star Music; Halo-Halo Entertainment, Inc.; Vernalossom
- Formerly of: MNL48

Francinne Roy Rifol (born October 18, 2001), better known by her stage name Rans Rifol is a Filipino singer and actress. She was a former member of Filipino idol group MNL48.

== Career ==
=== Career beginnings ===
Rifol started appearing in television commercials when she was 11.

=== Singing ===
Rifol became a member of the girl group MNL48 in 2018.

=== Acting ===
In 2016, Rifol appeared in the film Patintero: Ang Alamat ni Meng Patalo.

Her appearance in the drama film Kun Maupay Man It Panahon won her the Best Supporting Actress award in the 2021 Metro Manila Film Festival.

== Discography ==
=== MNL48 ===
Year	No.	Album title	Role	Notes	Ref(s)
2018	2	"Pag-ibig Fortune Cookie"	A-side	Also sang "First Rabbit"	
2019	3	"365 Araw ng Eroplanong Papel"	A-side	Centered "Bingo!"	
2019	4	"Ikaw ang Melody"	A-side	Ranked 9th in 2019 General Election, also sang "So Long"	
2020	5	"High Tension"	A-side	Also sang "Green Flash"	

== Filmography ==
=== Television ===
Year	Title	Role	Notes	Source
2020	Ipaglaban Mo!	Movie actress	Episode: "Ungol"	
2022	A Family Affair	Colleen de Jesus	Supporting Role	
2022	The Goodbye Girl		Guest Role	
2023	Dirty Linen	Stella Baldonado	Recurring Role	
2023	The SPG Show: Saktong Pang-Gabi	Herself / Host		
2023	ASAP Natin 'To	Herself	Co-host / Performer	
2023–2024	Senior High	Ria Cristobal	Recurring Role	
2024	High Street	Ria Cristobal	Supporting Role	
2025	Maalaala Mo Kaya		Episode: "Envelope (part 2)"	
2025	Rainbow Rumble	Herself	Contestant	
2025–2026	Roja	Claire Alegre		
2026	Love Is Never Gone	Diane		
2026	Miss Behave	Daphne Baldemor		

=== Film ===
Year	Title	Role	Notes	Source
2016	Patintero: Ang Alamat ni Meng Patalo	Lilay		
2017	Batibat			
2021	Kun Maupay Man It Panahon	Andrea		

== Awards and nominations ==
Year	Work	Organization	Category	Result	Source
2021	Kun Maupay Man It Panahon	Metro Manila Film Festival	Best Supporting Actress	Won	
2022	Kun Maupay Man It Panahon	FAMAS Award	Best Supporting Actress	Nominated	
