= Paolo Contis =

Filipino actor and comedian (born 1984)

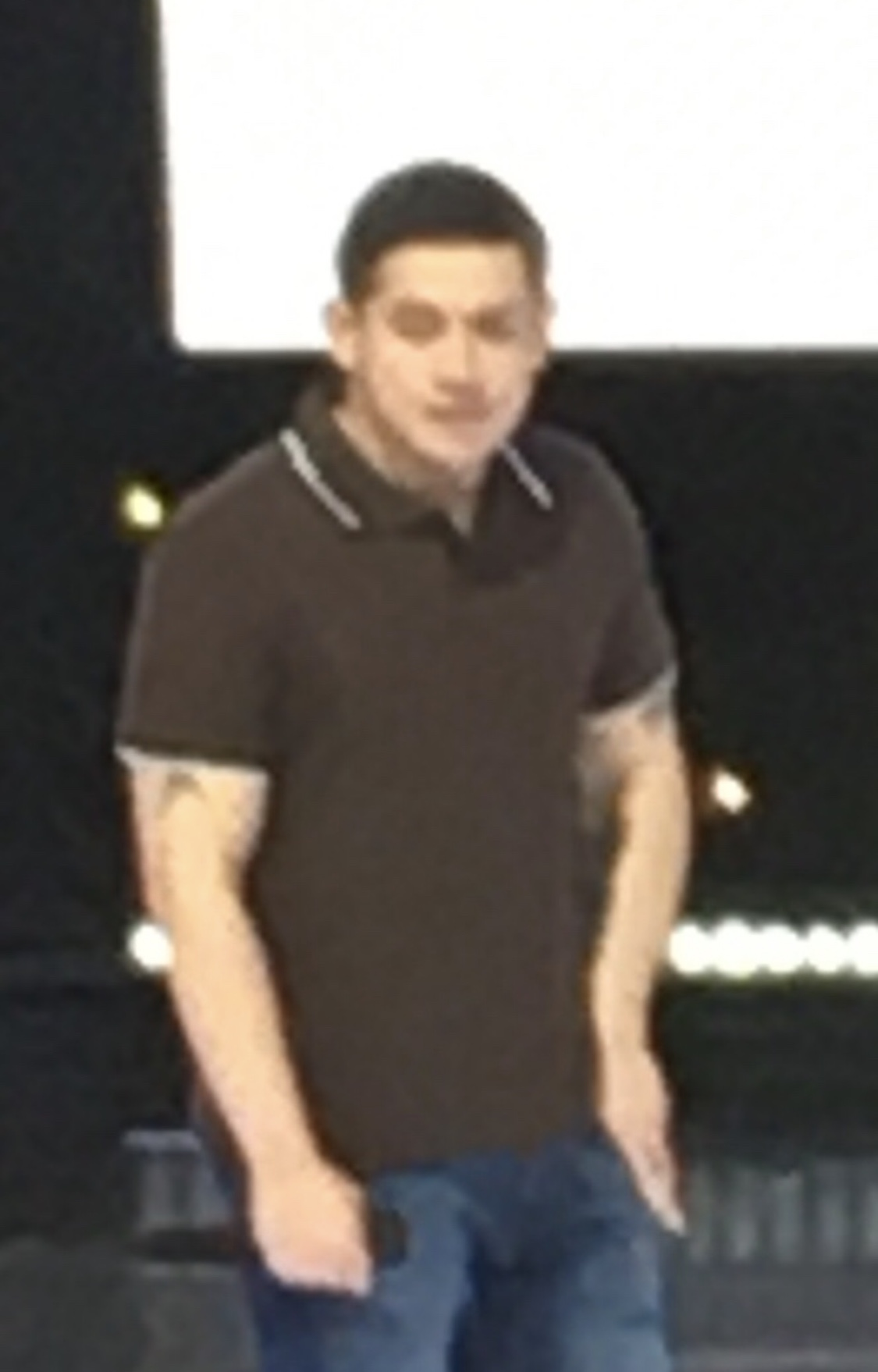
- Contis hosting Tahanang Pinakamasaya (TAPE's Eat Bulaga!) in 2023
- Born: Paolo Enrico Tusi Contis; March 14, 1984 (age 42); Manila, Philippines
- Education: Enderun Colleges
- Occupations: Actor; host; comedian; singer
- Years active: 1988–present
- Agent(s): ABS-CBN (1992–2004, 2023-present); Sparkle GMA Artist Center (2004–2023)
- Height: 1.78 m (5 ft 10 in)
- Spouse(s): Lian Paz (m. 2009; sep. 2012)
- Children: 3

Paolo Enrico Tusi Contis (born March 14, 1984) is a Filipino actor, host, singer, and comedian of Italian descent. Contis debuted as a child actor in the ABS-CBN show Ang TV during the 1990s. A GMA Network artist for 20 years, he has won several acting awards.

== Biography and career ==
Contis was born to an Italian father and a Filipino mother. He was a popular child actor who appeared in several films during the mid-1990s. Despite being cast in the popular drama series Mara Clara, Contis is better known for being part of kids-oriented program Ang TV, and the primetime sitcom Oki Doki Doc.

In his teenage years, he was launched as a member of Star Circle (now Star Magic) Batch 3 in 1996. Contis rose to fame for his appearance in the youth-oriented teen drama Tabing Ilog.

Contis moved to GMA Network in 2004. He ventured into more mature roles and played supporting and comical roles in numerous GMA dramas and shows, and has also found his niche in portraying antagonist roles. In 2008, Contis won at the 24th PMPC Star Award for Movies as "Best Actor" for the movie Banal, directed by GMA reporter Cesar Apolinario.

In August 2009, Contis played the role of Kobra, Valentina's father, in the fantasy series Darna. This was the second time that Contis has worked with actress Marian Rivera (the two previously worked together in Ang Babaeng Hinugot sa Aking Tadyang). Contis and Rivera worked together for the third time in the TV sitcom Show Me Da Manny, co-starring with Benjie Paras, Lovi Poe, and Ogie Alcasid.

Contis also hosted the defunct comedy reality show Wipeout: Matira Ang Matibay, his ninth comedy show in his television career and his fourth GMA comedy program. He was also cast in the drama series Little Star, marking his return to dramatic roles. He also took guest-hosting in the game show Press It, Win It when original host Joey de Leon took a temporary leave of absence; De Leon later returned to host the show.

In 2010, Contis returned to doing reality shows through Puso ng Pasko: Artista Challenge, GMA's first Christmas reality show.

In 2011, Contis worked in two drama series Machete and Futbolilits. He also took hosting duties in the game show Manny Many Prizes (with boxing champion Manny Pacquiao) and the talent show I-Shine: Talent Camp TV (with co-host Mikee Cojuangco-Jaworski and child actress Jillian Ward). In 2012, he starred in My Beloved and Aso ni San Roque. In 2013, Contis appeared in Love & Lies and the recent remake of Villa Quintana.

In 2020, his two movies Ang Pangarap kong Holdap and Through Night and Day earned spots in Netflix as most viewed films in the Philippines. The said movies had earlier been released in theaters in 2018 but did not do well at the box-office.

In 2021, Contis starred in the film A Faraway Land with Yen Santos.

In 2023, Contis was hired by TAPE Inc. as one of the new hosts for the reformatted version of Eat Bulaga!, which was later renamed as Tahanang Pinakamasaya. The show concluded in March 2024.

== Personal life ==
Contis is the father of three children. He has two daughters, Xonia Aitana and Xalene Abriana, from his previous marriage to Lian Paz, a former member of the EB Babes. As well as another daughter, Summer Ayana, from his relationship with LJ Reyes. On September 1, 2021, Contis confirmed that he and Reyes were no longer together. He was in a relationship with A Faraway Land co-star Yen Santos. They later broke up in 2024. He is currently single.

== Filmography ==
=== Film ===
| Year | Title | Role |
|---|---|---|
| 1990 | My Other Woman | (Credited as Paul Contis) |
| 1991 | Darna | Young Dong |
| 1992 | Narito ang Puso Ko | Dondon |
| 1992 | BigBoy Bato: Kilabot ng Kankaloo | |
| 1992 | Sonny Boy, Public Enemy Number 1 of Cebu City | Young Sonny |
| 1993 | Ang Kuya Kong Siga | Utoy |
| 1993 | Magkasangga sa Batas | Boyet (Credited as Paolo Conti) |
| 1994 | Hindi Pa Tapos ang Labada, Darling | Paolo |
| 1994 | Eat All You Can | |
| 1994 | O-Ha! Ako Pa? | Teddy |
| 1995 | Basta't Kasama Kita | Paolo |
| 1996 | Mara Clara: The Movie | Jepoy |
| 1996 | Oki Doki Doc: The Movie | Paolo |
| 1996 | Ang TV: The Movie | Jeremy |
| 1997 | I Do? I Die! (D'yos Ko Day!) | Paolo Mendiola |
| 1998 | Haba-Baba-Doo! Puti-Puti-Poo! | Paolo |
| 1998 | Hiling | Elwood |
| 1998 | Mystrio (Uno... Dos.. Tres... Pilyos!) | Paul |
| 2001 | Taxi Ni Pilo | |
| 2001 | Trip | Ram |
| 2003 | Noon at Ngayon: Pagsasamang Kay Ganda | Bryan |
| 2003 | Asboobs: Asal Bobo | Ronan |
| 2004 | Spirit of the Glass | Drue |
| 2005 | Let the Love Begin | Uno |
| 2005 | Hari ng Sablay | Popoy |
| 2005 | Mulawin: The Movie | Banoy |
| 2006 | Oh! My Ghost | Dennis |
| 2006 | Nasaan si Francis? | Boy |
| 2006 | Moments of Love | Juancho |
| 2006 | Pamahiin | Damian |
| 2006 | Reyna: Ang Makulay Na Pakikipagsapalaran ng mga Achucherva, Achuchuva, Achechenes.... | Chuvaneska |
| 2007 | Resiklo | Jerzon |
| 2008 | Banal | Cris |
| 2008 | Scaregiver | Ramil |
| 2008 | One Night Only | Diego |
| 2009 | Status: Single | Randy |
| 2009 | Litsonero | Fidel |
| 2012 | Boy Pick-Up: The Movie | Kapitan |
| 2015 | La Amigas | TV reporter |
| 2015 | Angela Markado | Leo |
| 2018 | Ang Pangarap Kong Holdap | Nicoy |
| 2018 | Through Night and Day | Ben |
| 2019 | Family History | |
| 2020 | Magikland | Boris |
| 2021 | A Faraway Land | Nico Mendoza |
| 2021 | iZla | Badong |
| 2023 | Ang Pangarap Kong Oskars | Bobby |
| 2024 | A Journey | Bryan |
| 2024 | Fuchsia Libre | Oliver/Keon/Fuchsia Libre |
| 2025 | Ang Happy Homes ni Diane Hilario | Tisoy |
| 2025 | Dear Santa | Satan |

=== Television ===
| Year | Title | Role |
|---|---|---|
| 1992–1996 | Ang TV | Himself |
| 1992–1997 | Mara Clara | Jepoy |
| 1993–2001 | Star Drama Presents | Guest role |
| 1993–2000 | Oki Doki Doc | Paolo |
| 1995–2004 | ASAP | Himself/co-host |
| 1997 | Kaybol: Ang Bagong TV | Himself |
| 1997 | !Oka Tokat | Nico |
| 1999–2003 | Tabing Ilog | Badong |
| 1999–2000 | Tarajing Potpot | Pepe |
| 1999 | Wansapanataym: Lazy Johnny Meets Juan Tamad | Johnny |
| 2000–2002 | Pangako Sa ’Yo | Vinny |
| 2002–2004 | Klasmeyts | Himself/Host |
| 2004 | Love 2 Love: Duet for Love | |
| 2004 | Love 2 Love: Pretty Boy | Ian/Ianne |
| 2005–2006 | Sugo | Adan |
| 2005 | Love 2 Love: Haunted LoveHouse | Nico |
| 2005 | Extra Challenge | Himself/Challenger |
| 2005–present | Bubble Gang | Himself/Regular Guest (2005-2012)/Main Cast (2012-present) |
| 2006 | Noel | Various |
| 2006 | Maynila | Various |
| 2006 | Love 2 Love: Like Mother, Like Daughters | Ivan |
| 2006 | Baywalk | Various |
| 2006 | Love 2 Love: Fat Is Fabulous | Boyong |
| 2006–2007 | Atlantika | Piranus |
| 2007 | Asian Treasures | Victor |
| 2007 | Magpakailanman: The Mom's Cake Band Story | |
| 2007 | Who's Your Daddy Now? | Paulo Burgos |
| 2007 | Mga Mata ni Angelita | Martin |
| 2007 | Fantastic Man | Madam Tisay |
| 2007–2008 | La Vendetta | Jun-Jun Sabino |
| 2008 | Babangon Ako't Dudurugin Kita | Tyrone San Juan |
| 2008 | Midnight DJ | Patrick |
| 2008 | Codename: Asero | Dave Avjeo |
| 2009 | Ang Babaeng Hinugot sa Aking Tadyang | Conrado "Rado" Barrientos |
| 2009 | My Dad Is Better Than Your Dad | Himself/Host |
| 2009 | SRO Cinemaserye: Suspetsa | Adam |
| 2009 | OC To The Max! | Himself/Host |
| 2009–2011 | Show Me Da Manny | Eric Paredes |
| 2009–2010 | Darna | Kobra/Xandro |
| 2010 | Wipeout: Matira ang Matibay | Himself/Host |
| 2010 | Pilyang Kerubin | Jonas Alejandrino |
| 2010 | 5 Star Specials | Various |
| 2010 | Showbiz Central | Himself/Guest Host |
| 2010 | Claudine Presents: Teacher's Pest | Various |
| 2010–2011 | Little Star | Lester Lumibao |
| 2010 | Jollitown | Alfredo |
| 2010 | Suwerteng Swerte Sa Siyete: Press It Win It! | Himself/Guest Host |
| 2010 | Puso ng Pasko: Artista Challenge | Himself/Challenger |
| 2011 | Pablo S. Gomez's Machete | Homer |
| 2011 | I-Shine Talent Camp TV | Himself/Host |
| 2011 | Futbolilits | Enrico Almodovar |
| 2011–2012 | Manny Many Prizes | Himself/Co-host |
| 2012 | Spooky Valentine Presents: Masahista | Mike |
| 2012 | My Beloved | Geronimo 'Gimo' Magtoto |
| 2012–2013 | Aso ni San Roque | Peter Silverio/Sento |
| 2013 | Love & Lies | Emmanuel "Manny" Perez |
| 2013 | Magpakailanman: Bayaning Yagit | Mario |
| 2013 | Wagas: Puso sa Puso | Jojo Rugay |
| 2013 | Wagas: Langit at Lupa | Rene Bijasa |
| 2013 | Magpakailanman: Sa Mata ng Daluyong | Jiggy Manicad |
| 2013–2014 | Villa Quintana | Robert Quintana |
| 2014 | Yagit | Rex Delos Santos |
| 2015 | The Rich Man's Daughter | Tommy Alvaro |
| 2015 | Magpakailanman: Tapat na Asawa, Baliw na Ina | Ompong |
| 2015–2016 | Little Nanay | Stanley Cubrador |
| 2016 | Dear Uge | Gardo |
| 2016 | Magpakailanman: Gang War Victim | Sky |
| 2016 | Sinungaling Mong Puso | Erick |
| 2016 | Alyas Robin Hood | Daniel Acosta |
| 2016 | Hay, Bahay! | Empoy |
| 2017 | 3 Days of Summer | Himself |
| 2018 | Barangay 143 | Koboy |
| 2019 | Hiram na Anak | Benjo Alvarez |
| 2019 | Studio 7 | Himself/Performer/Co-host |
| 2020–2023 | All-Out Sundays | Himself/Performer/Co-host/Various roles |
| 2020 | I Can See You: The Promise | Frank Agoncillo |
| 2021–2022 | I Left My Heart in Sorsogon | Michael Angelo "Mikoy" Macedonio |
| 2023–2024 | Eat Bulaga! | Himself/Host |
| 2024 | Tahanang Pinakamasaya! | Himself/Host |
| 2024 | Magpakailanman: A Son's Karma | Wilbert |
| 2025 | Mga Batang Riles | Jackson Romano |
| 2026 | The Master Cutter | Red Regalia |

== Awards and recognitions ==
- Winner, Best Actor in a Mini Series for Maalaala Mo Kaya - PMPC Star Awards for Television (2000, 2002, 2005 & 2006)
- Winner, 24th PMPC's Star Awards' Movie Actor of the Year of 2008: "Banal" Comguild Productions
- Winner, 26th Luna Awards Best Actor of 2008: Banal
