= A Faraway Land =

- Directed by: Veronica Velasco
- Written by: Jinky Laurel
- Story by: Erwin Blanco
- Starring: Paolo Contis; Yen Santos
- Production company: MavX Productions
- Release date: August 19, 2021 (Netflix)
- Country: Philippines
- Languages: Filipino; English

A Faraway Land is a 2021 Philippine romantic drama film directed by Veronica Velasco starring Paolo Contis and Yen Santos.

== Premise ==
Filipino reporter Nico Mercado from Cabanatuan heads to the Faroe Islands for a documentary about Overseas Filipino Workers (OFWs) in the Danish territory. He meets Filipino expatriate Mahjoy, who is married to Sigmund Garðalið, a local Faroese with whom she has a daughter. Nico develops a complicated relationship with Mahjoy in Sigmund's absence.

== Cast ==
- Paolo Contis as Nico Mercado
- Yen Santos as Mahjoy Garðalið
- Hans Tórgarð as Sigmund Garðalið

== Production ==
A Faraway Land was produced by MavX Productions and directed by Veronica Velasco. Principal photography took place between November and December 6, 2020 in the Faroe Islands amidst the COVID-19 pandemic. This followed MavX's film Through Night and Day which was filmed in nearby Iceland.

== Release ==
Due to the COVID-19 pandemic, the film's premiere did not occur in live cinema. A Faraway Land was made available instead through Netflix on August 19, 2021.

== Awards and nominations ==
Year	Award	Category	Recipient	Result	Ref.
2022	45th Gawad Urian Awards	Pinakamahusay na Aktres (Best Actress)	Yen Santos	Won	
