= Huling Ulan sa Tag-Araw =

- Theatrical release poster
- Directed by: Louie Ignacio
- Starring: Ken Chan; Rita Daniela
- Production company: Heaven's Best Entertainment
- Release date: December 25, 2021
- Country: Philippines
- Language: Filipino

Huling Ulan sa Tag-Araw (lit. 'Last Rain in Summer') is a 2021 Philippine romantic comedy drama film directed by Louie Ignacio under Heaven's Best Entertainment. It stars Rita Daniela and Ken Chan.

== Synopsis ==
Luis (Ken Chan), a seminarian, was given a leave to give him time to ponder whether he wants to become a priest. In his first night out, he encounters Luisa (Rita Daniela), a singer and sex worker, and unintentionally disrupted her transaction with a client. To compensate, Luis pays her money in exchange of going with him to his parents' house in Pagsanjan. There, the two develop feelings for each other.

== Cast ==
- Ken Chan as Luis
- Rita Daniela as Luisa
- Lotlot de Leon as Luis' mother
- Richard Yap as Luis' father

== Production ==
Huling Ulan sa Tag-Araw was produced under Heaven's Best Entertainment with Louie Ignacio as director. Filming took around eight to nine days in Pagsanjan, Laguna. Huling Ulan sa Tag-Araw marks the film debut for Rita Daniela and Ken Chan as a love team.

== Release ==
Huling Ulan sa Tag-Araw will premiere on December 25, 2021, in the Philippines as one of the official entries of the 2021 Metro Manila Film Festival.
