= Whether the Weather Is Fine =

2021 film by Carlo Francisco Manatad

Whether the Weather is Fine
- Festival poster
- Directed by: Carlo Francisco Manatad
- Screenplay by: Giancarlo Abrahan V; Carlo Francisco Manatad; Jérémie Dubois
- Produced by: Josabeth Alonso; Yulia Evina Bhara; Armi Rae Cacanindin; Arleen Cuevas; Ling Tiong; Vincent Wang; Jonas Weydemann
- Starring: Daniel Padilla; Rans Rifol; Charo Santos-Concio
- Cinematography: Teck Siang Lim
- Edited by: Bienvenido Ferrer III
- Music by: Andrew Florentino
- Production companies: Globe Studios; Black Sheep Productions; Dreamscape Entertainment
- Distributed by: ABS-CBN Film Productions
- Release dates: August 9, 2021 (Locarno International Film Festival); December 25, 2021 (Philippines)
- Running time: 104 minutes
- Country: Philippines
- Language: Waray-Waray

Whether the Weather is Fine, locally known as Kun Maupay Man It Panahon, is a 2021 Philippine drama film directed by Carlo Francisco Manatad in his feature directorial debut, from a screenplay he co-wrote with Giancarlo Abrahan V and Jérémie Dubois. The film is a disaster movie which combines satirical and surreal elements. Starring Daniel Padilla, Rans Rifol, and Charo Santos-Concio, the film is set against the backdrop of the devastation caused by Typhoon Haiyan in the Philippines. The film is a joint production by Black Sheep Productions, Globe Studios, and Dreamscape Entertainment.

The film had its world premiere on August 9, 2021, at the 74th Locarno Film Festival.

== Plot ==
In the aftermath of the devastating Typhoon Haiyan in 2013, a mother and son struggle for survival while searching for their loved ones.

== Cast ==
- Daniel Padilla as Miguel
- Rans Rifol as Andrea
- Charo Santos-Concio as Norma

== Production ==
=== Development ===
Whether the Weather is Fine has been in development since 2014. The project started from a screenplay by Manatad that did not initially use the typhoon as a backdrop. However, the completed film is ultimately based on Manatad's personal experiences of the 2013 typhoon in Tacloban. Manatad's original concept for the film was also more "narrative and dramatic."

The project received the Asian Cinema Fund for script development from the Busan International Film Festival in 2014. Manatad and his project were also among the invitees selected in 2016 to be a part of La Fabrique by Les Cinémas du Monde, a professional program collateral to the Cannes Film Festival which helps young directors develop their films.

In 2017, the film participated in the TorinoFilmLab, where it eventually won a TFL Co-Production Award, in the amount of €50K or ₱2.85M. The following year, Whether the Weather is Fine was selected to be a part of the 14th edition of the Cinéfondation L'Atelier, a program under the auspices of the Cannes Film Festival. The film also received the Berlinale's World Cinema Fund and substantial funding from the Aide aux Cinémas du Monde (France's World Cinema Support) and Institut Français, both in 2019. In 2021, the film received a second award from the TorinoFilmLab, the TFL Audience Design Fund.

Through these development labs, as well as Manatad's success in submitting a short film to the Cannes Film Festival (Jodilerks in la Semaine de la Critique in 2017), he was able to attract interested producers to the project. The film ultimately became a co-production between six different countries, and its international rights were picked up by Beijing-based distributor Rediance.

=== Casting ===
Manatad has described the cast as a "good mix", as it includes a veteran actress (Santos-Concio), a popular actor (Padilla), and a rising talent (Rifol). Manatad had long wanted to work with Padilla, but was uncertain if he would be able to secure him for the project. Padilla, who is mostly known for his love team romantic comedies and dramas with actress Kathryn Bernardo, did not join the project immediately. Concerned that the material was too heavy and that he would not be able to give justice to the role, Padilla eventually accepted the role after being given two weeks to decide by Manatad. Manatad has stated that Padilla was able to embody his character more easily because he is a native speaker of Waray.

The film also features actress Rans Rifol in her film debut. Rifol was formerly with the Filipina girl group MNL48 before switching to acting.

=== Filming ===
Principal photography for the film was completed in February 2020.

== Release ==
The film had its world premiere on August 9, 2021, at the 74th Locarno Film Festival, where it won the Cinema e Gioventù Prize. The film also screened at the 2021 Toronto International Film Festival in the Contemporary World Cinema section. Whether the Weather is Fine had its US premiere at the Chicago International Film Festival. It served as the closing film of the inaugural edition of Jakarta Film Week.

The film premiered in the Philippines on December 25, 2021, as an official entry to the 47th Metro Manila Film Festival.

== Accolades ==
Award	Year	Category	Recipient(s)	Result	Ref.
Asian Academy Creative Awards	2022	Best Feature Film (Philippines)	Kun Maupay Man It Panahon	Won	
Asian Academy Creative Awards	2022	Best Feature Film	Kun Maupay Man It Panahon	Nominated	
Entertainment Editors' Choice Awards	2022	Best Film	Kun Maupay Man It Panahon	Nominated	
Entertainment Editors' Choice Awards	2022	Best Director	Carlo Francisco Manatad	Nominated	
Entertainment Editors' Choice Awards	2022	Best Actor	Daniel Padilla	Nominated	
Entertainment Editors' Choice Awards	2022	Best Actress	Charo Santos-Concio	Won	
Entertainment Editors' Choice Awards	2022	Best Supporting Actress	Rans Rifol	Nominated	
Entertainment Editors' Choice Awards	2022	Best Screenplay	Carlo Francisco Manatad; Giancarlo Abrahan; Jérémie Dubois	Nominated	
Entertainment Editors' Choice Awards	2022	Best Cinematography	Teck Siang Lim	Nominated	
Entertainment Editors' Choice Awards	2022	Best Production Design	Juan Manuel Alcazaren	Won	
Entertainment Editors' Choice Awards	2022	Best Musical Score	Andrew Florentino	Nominated	
Entertainment Editors' Choice Awards	2022	Best Sound Design	Roman Dymny	Nominated	
Entertainment Editors' Choice Awards	2022	Best Visual Effects	Ogie Tiglao	Nominated	
FAMAS Award	2022	Best Picture	Kun Maupay Man It Panahon	Nominated	
FAMAS Award	2022	Best Director	Carlo Francisco Manatad	Nominated	
FAMAS Award	2022	Best Actor	Daniel Padilla	Nominated	
FAMAS Award	2022	Best Actress	Charo Santos-Concio	Won	
FAMAS Award	2022	Best Supporting Actress	Rans Rifol	Nominated	
FAMAS Award	2022	Best Screenplay	Carlo Francisco Manatad; Giancarlo Abrahan; Jérémie Dubois	Nominated	
FAMAS Award	2022	Best Cinematography	Teck Siang Lim	Nominated	
FAMAS Award	2022	Best Production Design	Juan Manuel Alcazaren	Won	
FAMAS Award	2022	Best Editing	Benjo Ferrer	Nominated	
FAMAS Award	2022	Best Musical Score	Andrew Florentino	Nominated	
FAMAS Award	2022	Best Sound	Roman Dymny	Nominated	
FAMAS Award	2022	Best Visual Effects	Ogie Tiglao	Nominated	
Gawad Urian Awards	2022	Best Film	Kun Maupay Man It Panahon	Nominated	
Gawad Urian Awards	2022	Best Director	Carlo Francisco Manatad	Nominated	
Gawad Urian Awards	2022	Best Actress	Charo Santos-Concio	Nominated	
Gawad Urian Awards	2022	Best Screenplay	Carlo Francisco Manatad; Giancarlo Abrahan; Jérémie Dubois	Nominated	
Gawad Urian Awards	2022	Best Cinematography	Teck Siang Lim	Nominated	
Gawad Urian Awards	2022	Best Editing	Benjo Ferrer	Nominated	
Gawad Urian Awards	2022	Best Production Design	Juan Manuel Alcazaren	Won	
Gawad Urian Awards	2022	Best Music	Andrew Florentino	Nominated	
Gawad Urian Awards	2022	Best Sound	Roman Dymny	Nominated	
Metro Manila Film Festival	2021	Best Picture	Kun Maupay Man It Panahon	Won (2nd)	
Metro Manila Film Festival	2021	Best Director	Carlo Francisco Manatad	Nominated	
Metro Manila Film Festival	2021	Best Actor	Daniel Padilla	Nominated	
Metro Manila Film Festival	2021	Best Actress	Charo Santos-Concio	Won	
Metro Manila Film Festival	2021	Best Supporting Actress	Rans Rifol	Won	
Metro Manila Film Festival	2021	Best Cinematography	Teck Siang Lim	Nominated	
Metro Manila Film Festival	2021	Best Production Design	Juan Manuel Alcazaren	Won	
Metro Manila Film Festival	2021	Best Sound	Roman Dymny	Nominated	
Metro Manila Film Festival	2021	Best Musical Score	Andrew Florentino	Nominated	
Metro Manila Film Festival	2021	Best Visual Effects	Ogie Tiglao	Won	
Metro Manila Film Festival	2021	Gatpuno Antonio J. Villegas Cultural Awards	Kun Maupay Man It Panahon	Won	
Metro Manila Film Festival	2021	Special Jury Prize	Daniel Padilla	Won	
Metro Manila Film Festival	2021	Most Gender-Sensitive Film	Kun Maupay Man It Panahon	Nominated	
Pinoy Rebyu Awards	2022	Best Film	Kun Maupay Man It Panahon	Won	
Pinoy Rebyu Awards	2022	Best Director	Carlo Francisco Manatad	Nominated	
Pinoy Rebyu Awards	2022	Best Screenplay	Carlo Francisco Manatad; Giancarlo Abrahan; Jérémie Dubois	Nominated	
Pinoy Rebyu Awards	2022	Best Lead Performance	Charo Santos-Concio	Nominated	
Pinoy Rebyu Awards	2022	Best Supporting Performance	Rans Rifol	Nominated	
Pinoy Rebyu Awards	2022	Best Ensemble Performance	Charo Santos-Concio; Daniel Padilla; Rans Rifol	Nominated	
Pinoy Rebyu Awards	2022	Best Editing	Benjo Ferrer	Won	
Pinoy Rebyu Awards	2022	Best Cinematography	Teck Siang Lim	Won	
Pinoy Rebyu Awards	2022	Best Production Design	Juan Manuel Alcazaren	Won	
Pinoy Rebyu Awards	2022	Best Film Score	Andrew Florentino	Won	
Pinoy Rebyu Awards	2022	Best First Feature	Kun Maupay Man It Panahon	Won	
PMPC Star Awards for Movies	2022	Movie of the Year	Kun Maupay Man It Panahon	Nominated	
PMPC Star Awards for Movies	2022	Movie Director of the Year	Carlo Francisco Manatad	Nominated	
PMPC Star Awards for Movies	2022	Movie Actress of the Year	Charo Santos-Concio	Nominated	
PMPC Star Awards for Movies	2022	Movie Actor of the Year	Daniel Padilla	Nominated	
PMPC Star Awards for Movies	2022	New Movie Actress of the Year	Rans Rifol	Nominated	
PMPC Star Awards for Movies	2022	Movie Ensemble Acting of the Year	Charo Santos-Concio; Daniel Padilla; Rans Rifol	Nominated	
PMPC Star Awards for Movies	2022	Movie Screenwriter of the Year	Carlo Francisco Manatad; Giancarlo Abrahan; Jérémie Dubois	Nominated	
PMPC Star Awards for Movies	2022	Movie Cinematographer of the Year	Teck Siang Lim	Nominated	
PMPC Star Awards for Movies	2022	Movie Editor of the Year	Benjo Ferrer	Nominated	
PMPC Star Awards for Movies	2022	Movie Production Designer of the Year	Juan Manuel Alcazaren	Nominated	
PMPC Star Awards for Movies	2022	Movie Musical Scorer of the Year	Andrew Florentino	Nominated	
PMPC Star Awards for Movies	2022	Movie Sound Engineer of the Year	Roman Dymny	Nominated	
