= Big Night! =

2021 black comedy film by Jun Robles Lana

- Theatrical release poster
- Directed by: Jun Robles Lana
- Written by: Jun Robles Lana
- Produced by: Guido Zaballero; Sienna Olaso; Vitto Lazatin; Isabel Santillan; Ferdinand Lapuz
- Starring: Christian Bables
- Edited by: Benjamin Tolentino
- Music by: Teresa Barrozo
- Production companies: Cignal Entertainment; The IdeaFirst Company; Octobertrain Films; Quantum Films
- Release dates: November 25, 2021 (PÖFF); December 25, 2021 (Philippines)
- Running time: 105 minutes
- Country: Philippines
- Languages: Filipino; Cebuano

Big Night! is a 2021 Philippine black comedy film written and directed by Jun Robles Lana.

== Cast ==
- Christian Bables as Dharna/Panfilo Macaspac Jr., a gay beautician who is determined to clear his name after he found he was included in a drug watchlist
- Nico Antonio as Zues, Dharna's lover
- Sunshine Teodoro as Biba
- Eugene Domingo as Madam
- Ricky Davao as Dharna's father
- Gina Alajar as Dharna's mother
- Soliman Cruz
- John Arcilla as Donato Rapido
- Janice De Belen as Melba, the president of Area 5
- Awra Briguela as Galema, Dharna's gay youngest sibling
- Sue Prado

The film also includes cameo appearances from Gina Pareño, Martin del Rosario, Ogie Diaz, Allan Paule, VJ Mendoza, and Cedrick Juan.

== Production ==
Big Night! was directed by Jun Robles Lana and is a co-production of Cignal Entertainment, The IdeaFirst Company, Octobertrain Films, and Quantum Films.

Lana decided to use the war on drugs initiated by President Rodrigo Duterte as the setting of his film.

Principal photography of Big Night! took place from January 2020 to mid-2020. Community quarantine measures were imposed as a response to the COVID-19 pandemic at the middle of the filming, thus part of the film had to be made under a lock-in set-up. Among the filming locations was the Quezon Institute.

Christian Bables said that someone helped him with the Cebuano-language dialogue in Big Night!, but he no longer required their assistance by the second day of filming. He attributes his ease with the language to his upbringing, as he was raised by a Bisaya mother.

== Release ==
Big Night! premiered on November 25, 2021, at the 25th Tallinn Black Nights Film Festival in Estonia. The film will have its theatrical release in the Philippines on December 25, 2021, as one of the eight official entries of the 2021 Metro Manila Film Festival.

== Accolades ==
Year	Award-giving body	Category	Recipient	Result	Ref.
2021	Metro Manila Film Festival	Best Picture	Big Night!	Won	
2021	Metro Manila Film Festival	Best Director	Jun Lana	Won	
2021	Metro Manila Film Festival	Best Actor	Christian Bables	Won	
2021	Metro Manila Film Festival	Best Supporting Actor	John Arcilla	Won	
2021	Metro Manila Film Festival	Best Supporting Actor	Nico Antonio	Nominated	
2021	Metro Manila Film Festival	Best Supporting Actress	Eugene Domingo	Nominated	
2021	Metro Manila Film Festival	Best Supporting Actress	Janice de Belen	Nominated	
2021	Metro Manila Film Festival	Best Screenplay	Jun Lana	Won	
2021	Metro Manila Film Festival	Best Cinematography	Carlo Mendoza	Won	
2021	Metro Manila Film Festival	Best Production Design	Maolen Fadul	Nominated	
2021	Metro Manila Film Festival	Best Editing	Benjamin Tolentino	Nominated	
2021	Metro Manila Film Festival	Best Sound	Emmanuel Verona	Nominated	
2021	Metro Manila Film Festival	Best Musical Score	Teresa Barrozo	Won	
2021	Metro Manila Film Festival	Best Float	Big Night!	Nominated	
2021	Metro Manila Film Festival	Gender Sensitivity Award	Big Night!	Won	
