= John Arcilla =

Filipino actor (born 1966)

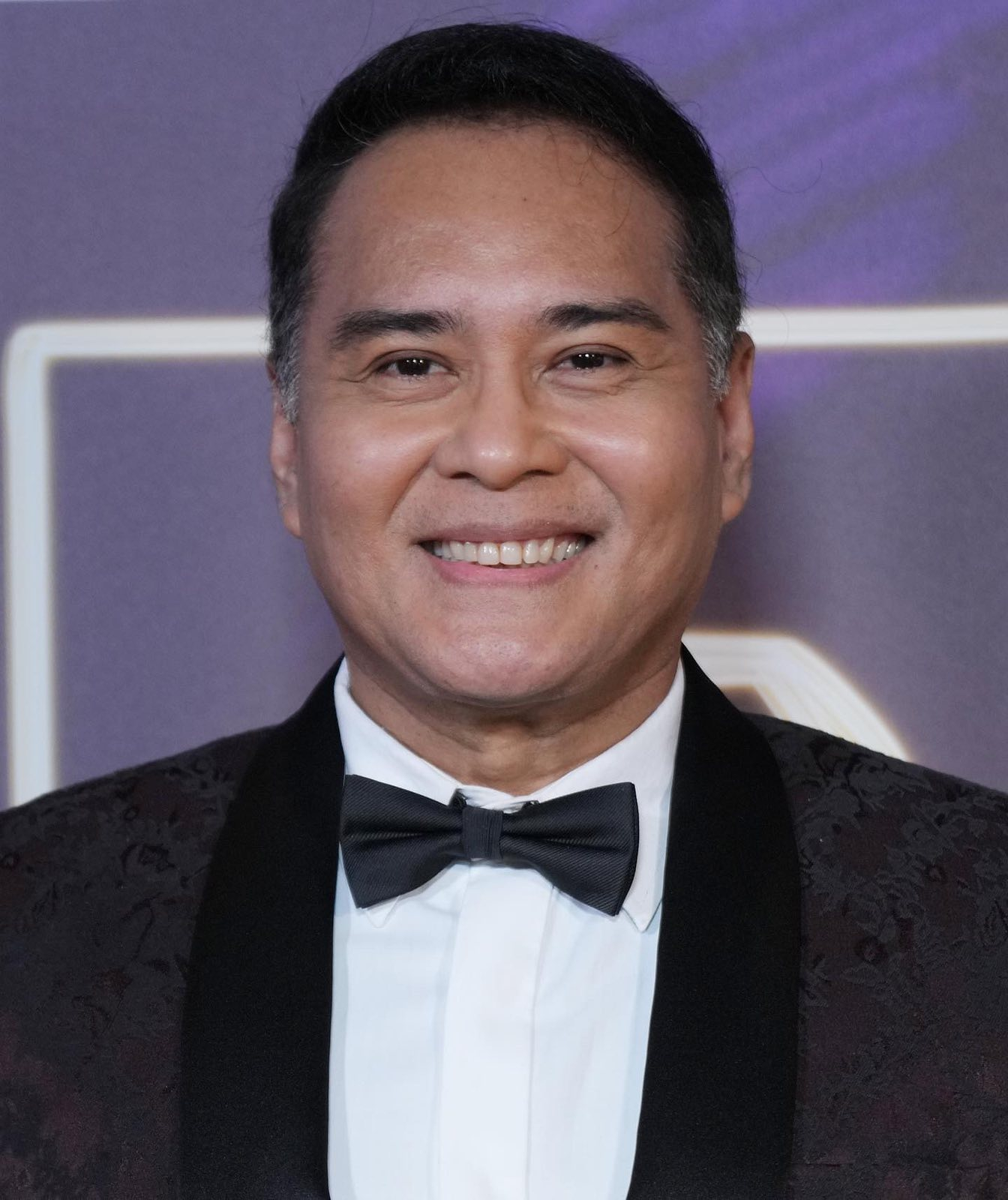
- Arcilla in 2024
- Born: Romeo John Gonzales Arcilla; June 24, 1966 (age 60); Manila, Philippines
- Education: Saint Joseph's College of Quezon City
- Occupation: Actor
- Years active: 1989–present
- Agent: Star Magic (2021–present)
- Known for: Heneral Luna, On the Job: The Missing 8, FPJ's Ang Probinsyano
- Height: 173 cm (5 ft 8 in)
- Political party: NPC (2010)
- Awards: Volpi Cup for Best Actor (2021); Gawad Urian Award for Best Actor (2022)
- Website: sites.google.com/view/john-arcilla/home

Romeo John Gonzales Arcilla (born June 24, 1966) is a Filipino film and television actor who has portrayed roles including Antonio Luna in Heneral Luna, Hagorn in Encantadia, Carlos Fiero in Dirty Linen, President Eleazar Sagrado in Pamilya Sagrado, and Renato Hipolito in FPJ's Ang Probinsyano.

In 2021, he was awarded the Volpi Cup for Best Actor at the Venice International Film Festival for his role in On the Job: The Missing 8, making him the first Filipino and Southeast Asian actor to receive the award. He also received the Best Actor award at the Gawad Urian Awards in 2022 for the same role.

== Early life and education ==
Romeo John Gonzales Arcilla was born on June 24, 1966 in Manila, Philippines. He is a grandnephew to former President Manuel L. Quezon on his mother's side. Arcilla and his family moved to his mother's hometown of Baler, Aurora in 1972 after the martial law declaration in the Philippines. He began to show an interest in acting at the age of seven.

Arcilla was a member of the community-based Philippine Educational Theater Association – Metropolitan Teen Theater League (PETA-MTTL). In 1986, he graduated from Saint Joseph's College of Quezon City (SJCQC). He was also an acting scholar of the Actors Workshop Foundation under Laurice Guillen, Johnny Delgado, and Leo Martinez from 1987 to 1990.

== Career ==
=== 1988–1996: theatre debut and early television work ===
Arcilla was a member of Dulang University in the Philippines from 1988 to 1989 and was trained by stage director and National Artist for Theatre Tony Mabesa. From 1989 to 1990, Arcilla worked as a casting director for Foote, Cone & Belding.

From 1991 to 1997, Arcilla was a resident actor and senior member of the Tanghalang Pilipino Actor Company, the resident theatre of the Cultural Center of the Philippines. At the Cultural Center, he played lead roles in productions including Orosman and Zafira, Walang Sugat, and Ryan Cayabyab’s Rizal musical trilogy: El filibusterismo (1993), Noli Me Tángere (1995), and Illustrado (1996). Arcilla was also part of the main cast of Rama at Sita, a 1999 Filipino musical adapted from the Indian epic Ramayana. In 2000, he appeared with Repertory Philippines as Valentin in Kiss of the Spider Woman.

Arcilla also appeared in television commercials for brands including Tide, Gold Eagle, the National Steel Corporation, and the Development Bank of the Philippines. He appeared in a 1994 commercial for Pure Foods with the slogan "Coffee na lang, dear" ("Just coffee, dear"), which lead to more opportunities in narrative television. In 1987, he appeared in television programs including the variety show Goin' Bananas and the drama anthologies Lovingly Yours, Helen and Star Drama Theatre Presents.

From 1992 on, he acted in a number of films, including Mulanay (1996). In 1997, he appeared in Ligaya ang Itawag Mo sa Akin.

=== 1997–2009: career expansion and recognition ===
From 1998 to 2005, Arcilla played supporting roles in film and television, including Pangako sa 'Yo (2000), Basta't Kasama Kita (2003), and Sugo (2005). He starred in the film adaptation of Tony Perez's play Sa North Diversion Road with Irma Adlawan.

=== 2010s ===
In 2010, Arcilla starred in Halaw, and afterwards returned to television in Magkaribal.

In 2012, Arcilla had a cameo in The Bourne Legacy as a head security guard. In 2013, Arcilla appeared in Metro Manila, which was selected as the British entry for Best Foreign Language Film at the 86th Academy Awards.

In 2015, he portrayed General Antonio Luna in Heneral Luna; for the role he studied Luna's temperament and vulnerabilities. The film was reported as the highest‑grossing Filipino historical film at the time. He later reprised and parodied the role in television commercials.

In 2016, Arcilla appeared in Mikhail Red’s Birdshot as police officer Mendoza.

From 2017 to 2022, Arcilla played Renato "Buwitre" Hipolito, a government official and antagonist in FPJ's Ang Probinsyano. In 2019, he appeared in the comedy film The Panti Sisters and in the Filipino adaptation of Miracle in Cell No. 7.

=== 2020s ===
In 2020, Arcilla portrayed Fernando Suarez in Suarez: The Healing Priest, and in 2021 was in On the Job: The Missing 8. Arcilla won the Volpi Cup for Best Actor at the Venice international Film Festival for his performance in On the Job: The Missing 8 (2021).

He also appeared in Big Night! and A Hard Day, both selected for the 2021 Metro Manila Film Festival. In A Hard Day, he played the villain Lieutenant Ace "Alas" Franco. In 2023, Arcilla played Carlos Fiero in Dirty Linen and later appeared in Jun Lana’s film Ten Little Mistresses.

In September 2023, Arcilla became host of the TV5 game show SpinGo. In 2024, he appeared in Fuchsia Libre from Mavx Productions, playing the father of a gay wrestler.

=== Political career ===
He ran for city councilor in the 1st district of Parañaque in 2010, but lost.

== Filmography ==
=== Film ===
Year	Title	Role	Source
1989	Orapronobis	Photojournalist	
1992	Bayani	Mariano Noriel	
1993	Sakay	Gen. Leon Villafuerte	
1995	Sa'yo Lamang	Hector	
1996	Mulanay	Lino	
1997	Ligaya Ang Itawag Mo Sa Akin	Polding	
1999	Batang Pro	Milet's father	
1999	Burger Boys	Sir. Fernando Ayala	
1999	Ekis: Walang Tatakas	George	
2000	Ang Babaeng Putik	Lt. Ramil	
2000	Anino	Man in black	Short film
2000	Biyaheng Langit	Berto	
2000	Gusto Ko Nang Lumigaya		
2001	Trip	Joboy and Celine's Dad	
2002	Sana Totoo Na	Carlo	
2002	Diskarte	Insp. John Gomez	
2002	Forevermore	Ronaldo	
2003	Ligaya...Katumbas ng Buhay		
2004	Now That I Have You	Oscar Morelos	
2005	Sa North Diversion Road	Man	
2006	Compound	Virgilio delos Reyes	Short film
2007	A Love Story	Steve	
2008	Ay Ayeng		
2009	Villa Estrella	Dave	
2009	Himpapawid (Manila Skies)	Crispin	
2010	Halaw (Ways of the Sea)	Hernand	
2010	Amigo	Nenong	
2010	Petrang Kabayo	Poldo	
2011	Thelma	Aldo Molino	
2011	No Other Woman	Mario dela Costa	
2011	Huling Araw ng Pagsisilbi (Short film)		Short film
2012	The Bourne Legacy	Joseph	Cameo
2012	Lilet Never Happened	James	
2012	El Presidente	Mariano Trías	
2013	Metro Manila	Douglas Ong	
2014	Muslim Magnum .357: To Serve and Protect	Col. Jose Ramos	
2015	Heneral Luna	Gen. Antonio Luna	
2015	Pamanhikan	Raynaldo Hernandez Sr.	
2016	Birdshot	Mendoza	
2016	Supot	Itoy	
2019	Second Coming	Priest	
2019	Kuwaresma	Arturo Fajardo	
2019	The Panti Sisters	Don Emilio y Panti	
2019	Miracle in Cell No. 7	Johnny San Juan	
2020	Suarez: The Healing Priest	Fernando Suarez	
2021	On the Job: The Missing 8	Narciso "Sisoy" Salas	
2021	Big Night!	Donato Rapido	
2021	A Hard Day	Lieutenant Ace "Alas" Franco	
2022	Reroute	Gemo	
2023	Ten Little Mistresses	Valentin Esposo / Constantin Esposo	
2023	Penduko	Apo Tisot	
2024	Fuchsia Libre	Danilo Malvar	
2025	Bilyarista	Itoy	

=== Television / digital series ===
Year	Title	Role	Source
1989–1992	That's Entertainment	Himself / Co-host / Performer	
1992–1994, 1995–1997	Valiente	Froilan / Benjie	
1995–2015	Maalaala Mo Kaya	Fidel Chavez / Benny / Tatay / Papa	
1996	Bayani	Marcelo H. del Pilar	
1999	G-mik	Cesar Rivera	
2000–2002	Pangako Sa 'Yo	Simon Barcial	
2003–2004	Basta't Kasama Kita	Godofredo "Prince" Gonzales	
2003–2004	Buttercup	Orly	
2004–2005	SCQ Reload: OK Ako!	Dennis Roxas	
2005–2017	Magpakailanman	Mang Ente / Tatay Ador / Berto / Manny / Ricardo / Hector / Chito / Sergio	
2005–2006	Sugo	Romeo	
2006–2007	Komiks Presents: Da Adventures of Pedro Penduko	Mang Tony	
2006–2008	Abt Ur Luv	Ramon Brondial	
2007	Pangarap na Bituin	Benedict Tuazon	
2007	Sineserye Presents: May Minamahal	Ronald Tagle	
2007	Mga Kuwento ni Lola Basyang: The Palace of the Dwarves	Lard	
2007–2008	Boys Nxt Door	Buboy's father	
2008	Carlo J. Caparas' Gagambino	Alejandro Bayani	
2008	I Am KC	Himself	
2009–2010	Sana Ngayong Pasko	King	
2009–2010	May Bukas Pa	Eduardo	
2010	Magkaribal	Hermes Agustin	
2010	Habang May Buhay	Manuel Corpuz	
2011	Pablo S. Gomez's Machete	Alfonso	
2011	Pepito Manaloto	Luis	
2011	Precious Hearts Romances Presents: Mana Po	Vino Dela Paz	
2011–2012	Wansapanataym	Fidel Sandoval / Tatay / Daddy	
2011	Mula sa Puso	Don Fernando Pereira Sr.	
2012	My Beloved	Romeo Quijano	
2012	Precious Hearts Romances Presents: Lumayo Ka Man Sa Akin	Juanito Falcon	
2012	Precious Hearts Romances Presents: Hiyas	Donato Salvador	
2012–2013	A Beautiful Affair	Leopoldo "Epong" Riego	
2013	Be Careful with My Heart	Wedding Priest	
2013	Apoy sa Dagat	Odessa's father	
2013	One Day, Isang Araw	Eduardo	
2013	Genesis	Fredirico "Fred" de Guzman	
2014	Pure Love	Peter Santos	
2015	Oh My G!	Joe "Daddy-Ninong" Luna	
2016	The Story of Us	Danillo "Danny" Manalo	
2016	That's My Amboy	Joselito "Lito" Tapang	
2016–2017	Encantadia	Hagorn	
2017–2022	FPJ's Ang Probinsyano	Renato "Buwitre" Hipolito	
2018	Barangay 143	Coach B (Roberto "Bobby" Sebastián Sr.)	
2019	Ipaglaban Mo: Gayuma	Pedring	
2020	Bangon Talentadong Pinoy	Himself	
2022	How to Move On in 30 Days	Mon (Jen's father)	
2022	It's Showtime	Himself / Hurado (guest judge)	
2023	Dirty Linen	Carlos Fiero	
2023	ASAP	Himself / Co-host / Performer	
2023	SpinGo	Host	
2024	Pamilya Sagrado	Sen. Eleazar "Elias" Sagrado	
2025	Lolong: Bayani ng Bayan	Julio Figueroa	
2025	Sins of the Father	Mike Trinidad	
2025–2026	The Alibi	Arthur Cabrera	
2025–2026	Encantadia Chronicles: Sang'gre	Hagorn	

== Awards and nominations ==
Arcilla has received awards and nominations in the Philippines and internationally. In 2013, he was nominated for Best Supporting Actor at the British Independent Film Awards for Metro Manila. In 2016, he received a Best Actor nomination at the Asian Film Awards for Heneral Luna.

In 2017, Arcilla received a Best Supporting Actor Craft Award from the First Run Festival for the short film Supot. In 2021, he received the Volpi Cup for Best Actor at the Venice International Film Festival for On the Job: The Missing 8.

Arcilla received the Best Supporting Actor award from the Gawad Urian in 1997 for Ligaya Ang Itawag Mo Sa Akin. Director Jerrold Tarog cast Arcilla in the leading role of Heneral Luna after seeing his performances in Anino and Metro Manila.

Arcilla was awarded the Dangal ng Aurora (Aurora's Honor) by his home province in 2005 for his work in theatre, film, and television. In 2009, he received an Outstanding Citizen Award from the municipality of San Luis, Aurora for achievements in the performing arts.

=== For performance in film and television ===
Year	Award-giving Body	Category	Work	Result
1996	Manila Film Festival	Best Actor	Mulanay	Won
1997	Gawad Urian Awards	Best Supporting Actor	Ligaya Ang Itawag Mo Sa Akin	Won
2006	Golden Screen Award	Best Performance by an Actor in a Leading Role (Drama)	On The North Diversion Road	Nominated
2007	Golden Screen Award	Best Performance by an Actor in a Leading Role (Drama)	Compound	Nominated
2007	Star Awards for Movies	Movie Actor of the Year	Compound	Nominated
2009	Gawad Urian Awards	Best Supporting Actor	Manila Skies	Nominated
2010	Cinemalaya Philippine Independent Film Festival	Best Actor (New Breed)	Halaw	Won
2011	25th PMPC Star Awards for Television	Best Single Performance by an Actor	Maalaala Mo Kaya – "Cross" episode	Nominated
2013	16th British Independent Film Awards	Best Supporting Actor	Metro Manila	Nominated
2016	2016 Platinum Stallion Media Awards	Best Film Actor	Heneral Luna	Won
2016	14th Gawad Tanglaw Awards	Gantimpalang Dr. Jaime G. Ang; Presidential Jury Award for Film	Heneral Luna	Won
2016	14th Gawad Tanglaw Awards	Highest Merit on Film Performance	Heneral Luna	Won
2016	10th Asian Film Awards	Best Actor	Heneral Luna	Nominated
2016	34th Film Academy of the Philippines Awards	Best Actor	Heneral Luna	Won
2016	MEDIA WORKS Commexcel Student Choice Awards of San Juan De Letran	Actor of the Year	Heneral Luna	Won
2016	Pangasinan Government URDUJA Film Festival	Best Actor	Heneral Luna	Won
2017	Craft Award from the 2017 First Run Festival held in New York	Best Supporting Actor	Supot	Won
2020	2020 Metro Manila Film Festival	Best Actor in a Leading Role	Suarez: The Healing Priest	Nominated
2021	78th Venice Film Festival	Volpi Cup for Best Actor	On the Job: The Missing 8	Won
2021	Lion HearTV	Royal Lion Awards	On the Job: The Missing 8	Won
2021	GEMS (Guild of Educators, Mentors, and Students)	6th GEMS Awards Natatanging Hiyas ng Sining sa Pelikula (Outstanding Medal in the Field of Film)	On the Job: The Missing 8	Won
2021	Esquire Philippines	Actor of the Year	On the Job: The Missing 8	Won
2021	Metro Manila Film Festival	Best Supporting Actor	Big Night!	Won
2021	Metro Manila Film Festival	Best Supporting Actor	A Hard Day	Nominated
2022	Manila Bulletin	MB Uplift Awards for Entertainment	On the Job: The Missing 8	Won
2022	Film Development Council of the Philippines	2022 Camera Obscura Artistic Excellence Award for Film	On the Job: The Missing 8	Won
2022	Society of Filipino Film Reviewers	2022 Best Lead Performance, 2nd Rebyu Awards	On the Job: The Missing 8	Won
2022	National Commission for Culture and the Arts	2022 Ani ng Dangal para sa Cinema	On the Job: The Missing 8	Won
2022	2022 Golden Laurel Media Awards	Best Drama Actor	FPJ's Ang Probinsyano	Nominated
2022	FAMAS Awards	Best Supporting Actor	Big Night!	Nominated
2022	FAMAS Awards	Best Supporting Actor	A Hard Day	Nominated
2022	ContentAsia Awards	Best Male Lead in a TV Programme	On the Job: The Missing 8	Nominated
2022	Asian Academy Creative Awards	Best Actor in a Leading Role – National Winner (Philippines)	On the Job: The Missing Eight	Won
2022	Gawad Urian Awards	Best Actor	On the Job: the Missing Eight	Won
2022	Gawad Urian Awards	Best Supporting Actor	Big Night!	Nominated
2022	Gawad Urian Awards	Best Supporting Actor	A Hard Day	Nominated
2022	Jeepney TV	Fave Best Supporting Actor	FPJ's Ang Probinsyano	Won
2022	24th Gawad Pasado (Pampelikulang Samahan ng mga Dalubguro	Best Supporting Actor	A Hard Day	Won
2022	5th EDDYS from the Society of Philippine Entertainment Editors (SPEEd)	Best Actor	On the Job: The Missing Eight	Nominated
2022	5th EDDYS from the Society of Philippine Entertainment Editors (SPEEd)	Best Supporting Actor	Big Night!	Nominated
2023	35th PMPC Star Awards for Television	Best Drama Supporting Actor	FPJ's Ang Probinsyano	Nominated
2023	37th PMPC Star Awards for Movies	Movie Actor of the Year Indie Movie Original Theme Song of the Year: "Yakapin Mo Ako" performed by John Arcilla	Suarez: The Healing Priest	Won
2023	38th PMPC Star Awards for Movies	Movie Actor of the Year	On the Job: The Missing Eight	Nominated
2023	38th PMPC Star Awards for Movies	Supporting Actor of the Year	A Hard Day	Nominated
2023	71st FAMAS Awards	Best Actor	Reroute	Nominated
2023	LUNA Awards 2023	Best Supporting Actor	Reroute	Won
2024	39th PMPC Star Awards for Movies	Movie Actor of the Year	Reroute	Nominated
2025	37th PMPC Star Awards for Television	Best Drama Supporting Actor	Dirty Linen	Nominated
2025	37th PMPC Star Awards for Television	Best Game Show Host	SpinGo	Nominated

=== Other awards and recognition ===
Year	Award-giving Body	Honor/Recognition Given
2005	Aurora Province Government	Dangal ng Aurora
2009	Aurora Province Government	Outstanding Citizens of San Luis, Aurora
2012	City of Marikina	Sapatos Festival Walk of Fame
2015	City of Parañaque	Meritorious contribution in the field of performing arts
2016	PMPC Star Awards 2016	Male Face of the Night
2016	University of Makati AGHAM Theater Company	Gawad Malayang Pilipino
2016	John Clements Youth for Leadership Summit	Award for Excellence in Arts and Culture
2016	City of Manila	Manila Day Honor: Arts and Culture Guide for Film (Architecture, Sculpture, Music, Theater, Painting, Modern Art, and Spirit of Race)
2016	PEOPLE ASIA	People of the Year Award
2016	GAWAD AMERIKA Awards	Most Outstanding Performance for Theater TV and Film
2016	The PEP Awards	Editors' Choice: Breakout Star of the Year
2016	Walk of Fame Philippines	Eastwood City Walk of Fame Star
2016	Inding-indie Golden Choice Award	3rd Indie Short Film Festival 2016 – Most Experienced Artist
2019	Film Development Council of the Philippines	Luminaries of Philippine Cinema
2021	Tatler Asia	Asia's Most Influential List
2022	Stargate, People Asia	People of the Year 2022
2022	Film Development Council of the Philippines	A-List Award
2022	Komisyon sa Wikang Filipino	Language Champion (film, television, and theater)
