= A Hard Day (2021 film) =

- Theatrical release poster
- Directed by: Lawrence Fajardo
- Screenplay by: Arlene Tamayo
- Based on: A Hard Day by Kim Seong-hun
- Produced by: Vincent del Rosario III; Veronique del Rosario-Corpus
- Starring: Dingdong Dantes; John Arcilla
- Cinematography: Jun Aves
- Edited by: Lawrence Fajardo
- Production company: AgostoDos Pictures
- Distributed by: Viva Films
- Release date: December 25, 2021
- Country: Philippines
- Language: Filipino

A Hard Day is a 2021 Philippine action thriller film directed by Lawrence Fajardo and produced by Arlene Tamayo. It is based on the 2014 South Korean film of the same name by Kim Seong-hun, starring Dingdong Dantes and John Arcilla and it is an official entry to the 2021 Metro Manila Film Festival. The movie was produced by VIVA Films.

== Plot ==
Edmund Villon (Dingdong Dantes), a corrupt detective whose mother recently died, drives away in the middle of the funeral, having been informed that his squad is being investigated by internal affairs for bribery. He crashes into a homeless man who wanders onto the road, killing him. Fearing manslaughter charges as he is intoxicated, Edmund declines to call the police, and hides the body from a passing patrol car. With the body in his trunk, he returns to the funeral and manages to seal the body into his mother's coffin while escaping detection. However, he realizes that the man's cell phone is also in the coffin after sealing it. A few days later, Edmund purposely gets into another crash to conceal the earlier damage and give him a reason to visit a repair shop. To the fortune of Edmund and his squad, the internal affairs investigation is cancelled by a lieutenant named Franco.

Edmund's squad is then assigned to locate and arrest a wanted murderer named Apyong (Nor Domingo), who is revealed to be the homeless man. While searching Apyong's hideout, the squad finds nothing significant, but they meet another police officer who is investigating a hit-and-run incident based on an anonymous tip. Apyong's hideout is right next to the site of the collision, and a traffic camera is nearby. The squad examines the low-quality camera footage, noting that the model of the colliding car is the same as Edmund's. The triangulation of Apyong's phone points to the area near Edmund's mother's grave.

It is revealed that the driver of the patrol car who drove past Edmund after he killed Apyong was Ace Franco (John Arcilla), the lieutenant who shut down the investigation into Edmund's team. Franco outranks Edmund, and although he witnessed Edmund's collision, he doesn't know where the body was taken. Rather than formally report Edmund, Franco blackmails him and demands possession of the body. Edmund excavates the coffin and searches Apyong, discovering bullet wounds on his body which indicate that Apyong had been shot before Edmund hit him. Apyong's cell phone receives a call from a fellow criminal, whom Edmund tracks down and interrogates. The criminal reveals that Franco stole a large amount of confiscated cocaine. However, after storing his profits in a private vault, Apyong stole the key and escaped. Franco shot Apyong and was chasing him when he was hit by Edmund's car. When asked about the key, Edmund finds out that anything important was always kept with Apyong on his body.

Edmund returns to the grave site and locates the key, but is arrested by his subordinate and closest friend, Arturo, who tailed him after discovering that Edmund's car was identified with the characters on the license plate caught by the traffic camera. Although Edmund confessed to Arturo about everything, Arturo decides not to arrest his friend for the sake of Edmund’s daughter. Edmund tells Arturo about Franco’s illegal operations. They suddenly receive a call from Franco instructing Edmund to get out of Arturo’s car so that the latter will not be involved. Arturo is killed when Franco uses a crane to drop a shipping container onto his car. Edmund gets ready to report on Franco and turn in himself as well, but Franco threatens to kill Edmund's sister and daughter. Edmund steals an explosive from the police basement and inserts it into Apyong's body. He gives the body to Franco and denotes the explosive, blasting Franco's van off a bridge into a lake. Edmund returns to his apartment and gets ready to report his crimes, but is attacked by Franco, who survived the explosion. Franco accidentally shoots and kills himself while trying to dislodge a revolver from a fallen bookshelf. Senior police officials decide to cover up Franco's and Edmund's crimes to protect their own reputations. Edmund chooses to resign, and start a business with his sister. While at their mother’s grave, Edmund finds the key he found from Apyong’s body after accidentally throwing it at the time Arturo found him early in the movie. He decides to go to the private vault of Franco and Apyong. Inside the vault he discovers an enormous reserve of cash, more than he could have imagined. But instead of keeping the money just for himself, he used some of the money to give to his sister and to poor people in need.

== Cast ==
- Dingdong Dantes as Detective Edmund Villon
- John Arcilla as Lieutenant Ace "Alas" Franco
- Al Tantay as the Chief
- Janno Gibbs as Arturo
- Meg Imperial as Erika Santino
- Rafa Siguion-Reyna as Jefferson
- Guji Lorenzana as Alvin
- AJ Muhlach as Dante Santino
- Arvic Tan as Benjo
- Gary Lim as Nathan
- Nor Domingo as Apyong
- Jelson Bay as Erris
- Pio Balbuena as Amanthe
- Kedebon Colim as Rocky
- Lou Veloso as Eduardo
- Lander Vera Perez as Ramon
- Archie Adamos as Mike
- Lhian Key Gimeno as Lia
- Vincent Soberano as Roland
- Ronald Moreno as Ferdie
- Marita Zobel as Lydia

== Production ==
A Hard Day was produced under Viva Films under the direction of Law Fajardo. It is an adaption of the 2014 South Korean film of the same name. Fajardo has praised the original source material's concept, pacing, and editing but added that he had to make adjustments to "Filipinized" his adaptation since some aspects of the original film were not applicable in a Philippine setting. He noted that South Korean funeral practices depicted in the 2014 film is different from Filipino funeral rites. The fight scenes were made longer for the Philippine adaptation compared to the South Korean film. Fajardo made sure that the fight choreography is polished technically but organic or something that mirrors real-life fistfights. Principal photography took place in May 2019.

== Release ==
A Hard Day was supposed to be released on April 14, 2020, at the 2020 Metro Manila Summer Film Festival. However the film festival was indefinitely postponed due to the COVID-19 pandemic. Instead, the film will premiere on December 25, 2021, as one of the official entries of the 2021 Metro Manila Film Festival.
