= Carlo Francisco Manatad =

Filipino filmmaker and editor

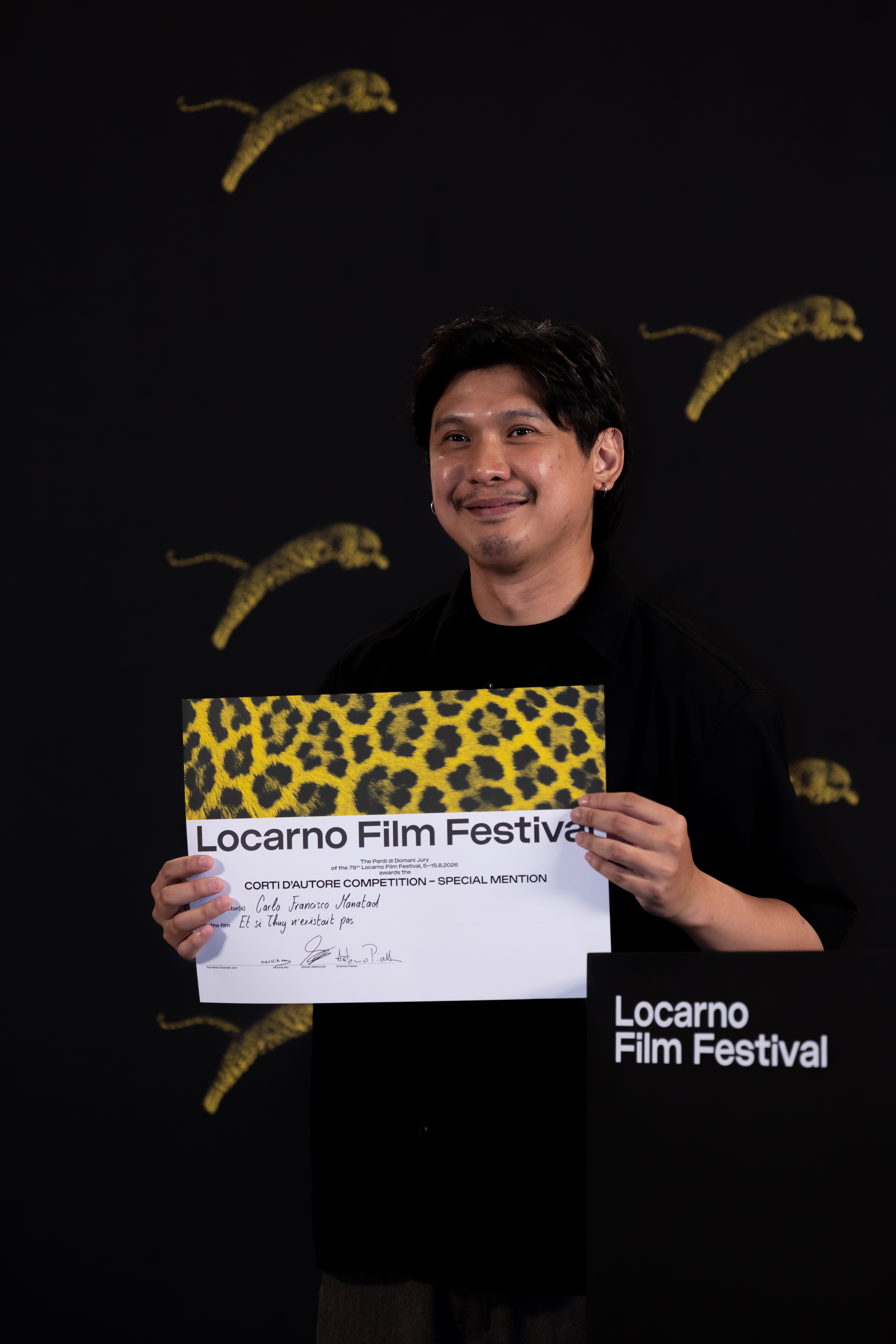
- Born: October 4, 1987 (age 38); Tacloban, Philippines
- Occupations: Filmmaker, editor
- Known for: Whether the Weather is Fine

Carlo Francisco Manatad (born October 4, 1987) is a Filipino filmmaker and editor. He is one of the most prolific editors in the Philippines and has edited the films Ruined Heart (2014), A Gentle Night (2017), Balangiga (2017) and Women of the Weeping River (2018) to name a few. As a director, his films have screened in a number of international film festivals, such as in Locarno, Toronto, Busan, and Cannes.

His most recent work is his feature film directorial debut, Whether the Weather is Fine (2021), which premiered at Locarno and won the Cinema e Gioventù Prize.

== Early life and education ==
Manatad was born in Tacloban City, Philippines. He studied in business school initially, then pursued engineering during his first few years of university before eventually shifting to film. He graduated from the University of the Philippines Film Institute. Manatad is also an alumnus of the Asian Film Academy, Berlinale Talent Campus, and Locarno Filmmakers Academy.

== Career ==
Manatad has worked on over 60 feature films as an editor and had been working as an editor for nine years before he started directing. In 2015, after encouragement from Khavn de la Cruz, Manatad directed his first short film Junilyn Has. The film was screened at the Locarno Film Festival and Singapore International Film Festival.

The film A Gentle Night (2017), for which Manatad served as editor, won the Short Film Palme d'Or at the 2017 Cannes Film Festival. Meanwhile, Manatad's short film Jodilerks Dela Cruz (2017), which originally was created as a treatment to show to producers and practice for a feature, was submitted and unexpectedly accepted to La Semaine de la Critique, a parallel sidebar section of Cannes which aims to discover new talented filmmakers. It also won the Best Southeast Asian Short Film award at the 2017 Singapore International Film Festival.

In 2018, Manatad returned to the Singapore International Film Festival with another short film The Imminent Immanent (2018), a companion piece to his feature film.

In 2021, Manatad wrote and directed his first feature film, Whether the Weather is Fine. The film had its world premiere at the Locarno Film Festival, competing in the Concorso Cineasti del Presente (Filmmakers of the Present Competition) program, where it won the Cinema E Gioventù Prize. The film also screened at the Toronto International Film Festival in the Contemporary World Cinema section.

== Selected filmography ==
=== Feature films ===
Year	Title	Director	Writer	Ref.
2021	Whether the Weather is Fine	Yes	Yes	
TBA	Brilliant Melody	Yes	Yes	

=== Documentary films ===
Year	Title	Director	Writer	Editor	Ref.
2019	ICYMI: I See Me	Yes	Yes	Yes	

=== Short films ===
Year	Title	Director	Writer	Editor	Ref.
2010	Hungkag	Yes			
2015	Junilyn Has	Yes	Yes	Yes	
2016	Sandra	Yes	Yes	Yes	
2016	Fatima Marie Torres and the Invasion of Space Shuttle Pinas 25	Yes	Yes	Yes	
2017	Jodilerks Dela Cruz, Employee of the Month	Yes	Yes	No	
2018	The Imminent Immanent	Yes	Yes	Yes	
