= List of Philippine films of 2019 =

This is an incomplete list of Filipino full-length films, both mainstream and independently produced, released in theaters and cinemas in 2019.

== Box office ==
- – an entry film for Pista ng Pelikulang Pilipino.
- – an entry film for Metro Manila Film Festival.

Highest-grossing films of 2019
Rank	Title	Distributor	Gross	Ref.
1	Hello, Love, Goodbye	Star Cinema	₱880.6 million	
2	Miracle in Cell No.7	Viva Films	₱500 million	
3	Alone/Together	ABS-CBN Films	₱370 million	
4	The Mall, The Merrier	Star Cinema, Viva Films	₱323 million	
5	The Panti Sisters	ABS-CBN Films	₱213.9 million	
6	Eerie	Star Cinema	₱201 million	
7	Jowable	Viva Films	₱115 million	
8	Just a Stranger	Viva Films	₱100 million	

== Films ==
=== January–March ===
Opening		Title	Production company	Cast and crew	Ref.
J A N U A R Y	8	Boy Tokwa: Lodi ng Gwapo	VST Productions	Tony Y. Reyes (director); Jose Manalo	
J A N U A R Y	11	The Gift	iWant Originals	Onat Diaz (director); Nash Aguas, Sharlene San Pedro	
J A N U A R Y	11	S.P.A.R.K.	iWant Originals	Carlo Artillaga (director); Andrea Brillantes, Grae Fernandez	
J A N U A R Y	16	Sakaling Maging Tayo	Black Sheep Productions	JP Mabac (director); McCoy de Leon, Elisse Joson	
J A N U A R Y	23	Born Beautiful	Cignal Entertainment, Octobertrain Films, The IdeaFirst Company	Perci M. Intalan (director); Martin del Rosario	
J A N U A R Y	25	Allergy in Love	iWant Originals	Joross Gamboa (director); Cholo Barretto, Chienna Filomeno	
J A N U A R Y	30	Bato: The Gen. Ronald dela Rosa Story	ALV Films	Adolfo Alix, Jr. (director); Robin Padilla, Beauty Gonzalez	
J A N U A R Y	30	'Tol	Reality Entertainment	Miko Livelo (director); Arjo Atayde, Ketchup Eusebio, Joross Gamboa	
J A N U A R Y	30	Ang Sikreto ng Piso	JPP Dreamworld Productions	Perry Escano (director); Ariel Rivera, Gelli de Belen	
F E B R U A R Y	6	Elise	Regal Entertainment	Joel Ferrer (director); Enchong Dee, Janine Gutierrez	
F E B R U A R Y	6	Hanggang Kailan?	Viva Films, BluArt Productions	Bona Fajardo (director); Xian Lim, Louise delos Reyes	
F E B R U A R Y	13	Alone/Together	Black Sheep Productions, Project 8 Corner San Joaquin Projects	Antoinette Jadaone (director); Liza Soberano, Enrique Gil	
F E B R U A R Y	14	Apple of My Eye	iWant Originals	James Robin Mayo (director); Marco Gumabao, Krystal Reyes	
F E B R U A R Y	20	Time & Again	Regal Entertainment	Jose Javier Reyes (director); Wynwyn Marquez, Enzo Pineda	
F E B R U A R Y	20	Exit Point	Rocketts Media Production Distributed by Viva Films and OctoArts Films	Ronnie Rickets (director); Ronnie Ricketts	
F E B R U A R Y	27	Familia Blondina	Arctic Sky Entertainment, Cine Screen	Jerry Lopez Sineneng (director); Karla Estrada, Jobert Austria, Kira Balinger, Marco Gallo, Xia Vigor, Chantal Videla, Shane Weinberg, Awra Briguela, Heaven Peralejo, Negi	
F E B R U A R Y	27	Second Coming	Reality Entertainment	Jet Leyco (director); Jodi Sta. Maria, Marvin Agustin, John Arcilla	
M A R C H	13	Ulan	Viva Films	Irene Villamor (director); Carlo Aquino, Nadine Lustre, Marco Gumabao, AJ Muhlach	
M A R C H	13	Neomanila	TBA Studios	Mikhail Red (director); Eula Valdez, Timothy Castillo, Rocky Salumbides	
M A R C H	20	Papa Pogi	Regal Entertainment	Alex Calleja (director); Teddy Corpuz, Myrtle Sarrosa	
M A R C H	20	Pansamantagal	Horseshoe Productions	Joven Tan (director); Gelli de Belen, Bayani Agbayani, DJ Chacha, Edgar Allan Guzman	
M A R C H	27	Eerie	Star Cinema, Pelikula Red, Media East	Mikhail Red (director); Bea Alonzo, Jake Cuenca, Maxene Magalona, Charo Santos-Concio	
M A R C H	27	Maria	Viva Films, BlackOps Studios Asia, Psyops8	Pedring Lopez (director); Cristine Reyes, Germaine De Leon, Jennifer Lee	
M A R C H	29	Mystified	iflix, Sanggre Productions	Mark Reyes (director); Karylle, Iza Calzado, Sunshine Dizon, Diana Zubiri	

=== April–June ===
Opening		Title	Production company	Cast and crew	Ref.
A P R I L	3	Akin ang Korona	Sinag Maynila	Zig Dulay (director); Nar Cabico	
A P R I L	3	Jesusa	Sinag Maynila	Ronald Carballo (director); Sylvia Sanchez	
A P R I L	3	Jino To Mari	Sinag Maynila	Joselito “Jay” Altarejos (director); Angela Cortez, Oliver Aquino	
A P R I L	3	Pailalim	Sinag Maynila	Daniel Palacio (director); Joem Bascon, Mara Lopez	
A P R I L	3	Persons of Interest	Sinag Maynila	Ralston Jover (director); Allen Dizon, Liza Lorena	
A P R I L	10	Last Fool Show	Star Cinema, N^{2} Productions, Emba Productions	Eduardo Roy Jr. (director); JM de Guzman, Arci Muñoz	
A P R I L	10	Stranded	Regal Entertainment	Ice Idanan (director); Jessy Mendiola, Arjo Atayde	
A P R I L	26	12 Days to Destiny	Blade Entertainment, Witty Jack Media	CJ Santos (director); Mary Joy Apostol, Akihiro Blanco	
M A Y	1	Maledicto	Fox Networks Group Philippines	Mark Miley (director); Tom Rodriguez, Jasmine Curtis-Smith, Miles Ocampo, Inah de Belen, Eric Quizon, Martin Escudero	
M A Y	8	S.O.N.S. (Sons of Nanay Sabel)	Viva Films	Dado C. Lumibao (director); Ai-Ai delas Alas, Ex Battalion	
M A Y	8	Tayo sa Huling Buwan ng Taon	TBA Studios	Nestor Abrogena Jr. (director); Nicco Manalo, Emmanuelle Vera, Anna Luna, Alex Medina	
M A Y	8	Man & Wife	Cineko Productions, Cinescreen	Laurice Guillen (director); Gabby Conception, Jodie Sta. Maria	
M A Y	15	Between Maybes	Black Sheep Productions	Jason Paul Laxamana (director); Gerald Anderson, Julia Barretto	
M A Y	15	Kuwaresma	Realty Entertainment, Globe Studios	Erik Matti (director); Sharon Cuneta, John Arcilla, Kent Gonzales	
M A Y	22	The Last Interview: The Mayor Antonio Halili Story	GreatCzar Media Production	Caesar Soriano (director); John Estrada, Ara Mina, Yayo Aguila, Martin Escudero	
M A Y	29	Quezon's Game	Kinetek, Star Cinema	Matthew Rosen (director); Raymond Bagatsing, Rachel Alejandro	
M A Y	29	Finding You	Regal Entertainment	Easy Ferrer (director); Jerome Ponce, Barbie Imperial, Jane Oineza	
M A Y	29	Banal	APT Entertainment	J.A Tadena (director); Andrea Brillantes, Bianca Umali, Miguel Tanfelix	
J U N E	5	Sunshine Family	Spring Films, Film Line	Kim Tai-Sik (director); Nonie Buencamino, Shamaine Buencamino, Sue Ramirez, Marco Masa	
J U N E	8	OFW: The Movie	Active Media Production	Neal Tan (director); Rafael Rosell, Dianne Medina, Kakai Bautista, Christian Vasquez, Sylvia Sanchez	
J U N E	12	Clarita	Black Sheep Productions	Derick Cabrido (director); Jodi Sta Maria, Arron Villaflor	
J U N E	19	Feelenial: Feeling Millennial	Cignal Entertainment, DSL Productions	Richie Del Carmen (director); Ai-Ai delas Alas, Bayani Agbayani	
J U N E	26	Because I Love You	Regal Entertainment	Joel Lamangan (director); David Licauco, Shaira Diaz, Michelle Dee	
J U N E	26	Kontradiksyon	BellFilms	Njel De Mesa (director); Jake Cuenca, Kris Bernal, Katrina Halili, Arnold Reyes	
J U N E	29	MOMOL Nights	iWant Originals	Benedict Mique (director); Kit Thompson, Kim Molina	

Color key

– a Sinag Maynila Film Festival entry film

=== July–September ===
Opening		Title	Production company	Cast and crew	Ref.
J U L Y	14	Misterio de la Noche	Throne Room Productions	Adolfo Alix Jr. (director); Solenn Heussaff, Benjamin Alves, Gina Alajar	
J U L Y	17	My Letters to Happy	I Am Who I Am Foundation	Pertee Briñas (director); Glaiza de Castro, TJ Trinidad	
J U L Y	24	Family History	GMA Pictures, Mic Test Entertainment	Michael V. (director); Michael V., Dawn Zulueta	
J U L Y	31	Hello, Love, Goodbye	Star Cinema	Cathy Garcia-Molina (director); Kathryn Bernardo, Alden Richards	
A U G U S T	2	ANi (The Harvest)	Cinemalaya Foundation	Kim Zuñiga and Sandro Del Rosario (directors); Ricky Davao, Zyren dela Cruz, Miguel Valdes	
A U G U S T	2	Belle Douleur (A Beautiful Pain)	Cinemalaya Foundation	Atty. Joji V. Alonso (director); Mylene Dizon, Kit Thompson	
A U G U S T	2	Children Of The River (Annak Ti Karayan)	Cinemalaya Foundation	Maricel Cariaga (director); Noel Comia Jr., Ricky Oriarte, Dave Justin Francis, Junyka Santarin	
A U G U S T	2	Edward	Cinemalaya Foundation	Thop Nazareno (director); Louise Abuel, Dido dela Paz, Elijah Canlas, Manuel Chua, Ella Cruz	
A U G U S T	2	F#*@BOIS	Cinemalaya Foundation	Eduardo Roy (director); Royce Cabrera, Kokoy de Santos, Ricky Davao	
A U G U S T	2	Iska	Cinemalaya Foundation	Theodore Boborol (director); Ruby Ruiz, Soliman Cruz	
A U G U S T	2	John Denver Trending	Cinemalaya Foundation	Arden Rod Condez (director); Jansen Magpusao, Meryll Soriano, Glenn Mas, Sammy Rubido	
A U G U S T	2	Malamaya (The Color of Ash)	Cinemalaya Foundation	Danica Sta Lucia and Leilani Chavez (directors); Sunshine Cruz, Enzo Pineda, Raymond Bagatsing, Bernadette Allyson	
A U G U S T	2	Pandanggo sa Hukay	Cinemalaya Foundation	Sheryl Rose M. Andes (director); Iza Calzado	
A U G U S T	2	Tabon	Cinemalaya Foundation	Xian Lim (director); Christopher Roxas, Ynna Asistio, Dexter Doria, Bapbap Reyes	
A U G U S T	7	Indak	Viva Films	Paul Alexei Basinillo (director); Sam Concepcion, Nadine Lustre	
A U G U S T	14	And Ai, Thank You	Reality Entertainment, Horseshoe Studios	Joven Tan (director); Ai-Ai delas Alas, Dennis Padilla, Rufa Mae Quinto	
A U G U S T	21	Just a Stranger	Viva Films	Jason Paul Laxamana (director); Anne Curtis, Marco Gumabao	
A U G U S T	21	Mina-Anud	Regal Entertainment, Epic Media	Kerwin Go (director); Dennis Trillo, Jerald Napoles, Dionne Monsanto, Matteo Guidicelli	
A U G U S T	23	Sarah Geronimo: This 15 Me	Netflix	Paul Basinillo (director); Sarah Geronimo	
A U G U S T	28	Abandoned	iWant Originals	Kip Oebanda (director); Beauty Gonzales, Seth Fedelin	
A U G U S T	28	The Ghosting	Reality Entertainment	Joey de Guzman (director); Andrea Brillantes, Khalil Ramos	
S E P T E M B E R	4	Sanggano, Sanggago't Sanggwapo	Viva Films	Al Tantay (director); Andrew E., Dennis Padilla, Janno Gibbs, Eddie Garcia	
S E P T E M B E R	13	Lola Igna	Found Films, EMBA Production	Eduardo Roy Jr (director); Yves Flores, Meryll Soriano, Maria Isabel Lopez, Angie Ferro	
S E P T E M B E R	13	Circa	Noble Wolf, ABAJ Film Productions, Swift Productions, RSVP	Adolf Alix (director); Anita Linda, Gina Alajar, Laurice Guillen, Jacklyn Jose, Elizabeth Oropesa, Ricky Davao, Enchong Dee, Eddie Garcia	
S E P T E M B E R	13	Pagbalik	Nuances Entertainment Productions, PRO. PRO	Hubert Tibi and Maria S. Ranillo (directors); Gloria Sevilla, Suzette Ranillo, Vince Ranillo, Alora Sasam	
S E P T E M B E R	13	LSS (Last Song Syndrome)	Globe Studios, Dokimos Media Studios, Ben&Ben	Jade Castro (director); Gabbi Garcia, Khalil Ramos, Tuesday Vargas, Ben&Ben	
S E P T E M B E R	13	The Panti Sisters	Black Sheep Productions, The IdealFirst Company Incorporated, Quantum Films, ALV Films	Jun Robles Lana (director); Paolo Ballesteros, Christian Bables, Martin del Rosario	
S E P T E M B E R	13	Cuddle Weather	Regal Entertainment, Project 8 corner San Joaquin Projects	Rod Marmol (director); Sue Ramirez, RK Bagatsing	
S E P T E M B E R	13	G!	Cineko Productions	Dondon Santos (director); Kira Balinger, McCoy de Leon, Jameson Blake, Paulo Angeles, Mark Oblea	
S E P T E M B E R	13	I'm Ellenya L.	Spring Films, N^{2} Productions, Cobalt Entertainment	Boy 2 Quizon (director); Maris Racal, Iñigo Pascual	
S E P T E M B E R	13	Watch Me Kill	CineBandits Entertainment, Greenlight, Viva Films	Tyrone Acierto (director); Jean Garcia, Jay Manalo	
S E P T E M B E R	13	Open	Black Sheep Productions, T-Rex Entertainment	Andoy Ranay (director); Arci Muñoz, JC Santos	
S E P T E M B E R	13	Mga Mata sa Dilim	iWant originals	Enzo Williams (director); Derek Ramsay, Jessy Mendiola, Joko Diaz	
S E P T E M B E R	20	Marineros: Men in the Middle of the Sea	Golden Tiger Films, Premier Dreams Production	Anthony Hernandez (director); Michael de Masa, Paul Hernandez, Claire Ruiz, Jon Lucas, Valerie Concepcion, Jef Gaitan, Ahron Villena	
S E P T E M B E R	25	Jowable	Viva Films, VinCentiments	Darryl Yap (director); Kim Molina, Cai Cortez, Chad Kinis, Kakai Bautista, Jerald Napoles	
S E P T E M B E R	25	Kiko En Lala	Backyard Productions, GMA Pictures	Adolf Alix, Jr. (director); Super Tekla, Kim Domingo, Derrick Monasterio, Divine Tetay, Donita Nose, Kiray Celis, Jo Berry	

Color key

- – a Cinemalaya Philippine Independent Film Festival entry film
- – a Pista ng Pelikulang Pilipino entry film
- – a ToFarm (The Outstanding Farmers in the Philippines) Film Festival entry film

=== October–December ===
Opening		Title	Production company	Cast and crew	Ref.
O C T O B E R	2	Ang Henerasyong Sumuko Sa Love	Regal Entertainment	Jason Paul Laxamana (director); Jerome Ponce, Jane Oineza, Albie Casiño, Myrtle Sarrosa, Tony Labrusca	
O C T O B E R	9	Black Lipstick	Obra Cinema Film Productions	Julius Ruslin Alfonso (director); Kyline Alcantara	
O C T O B E R	16	Isa Pa with Feelings	Black Sheep Productions, APT Entertainment	Prime Cruz (director); Carlo Aquino, Maine Mendoza	
O C T O B E R	23	Unforgettable	Viva Films, TheIdeaFirst Company	Jun Lana and Perci Intalan (directors); Sarah Geronimo	
O C T O B E R	25	You Have Arrived	iWant originals	Shugo Praico (director); Elisse Joson, Barbie Imperial, Arielle Roces	
O C T O B E R	30	Hellcome Home	Star Cinema	Bobby Bonifacio Jr. (director); Dennis Trillo, Alyssa Muhlach, Beauty Gonzalez, Raymond Bagatsing	
O C T O B E R	30	Santigwar	Reality Entertainment, Horseshoe Studios	Joven Tan (director); Alexa Ilacad, Marlo Mortel, Marco Gallo	
N O V E M B E R	6	Cara X Jagger	APT Entertainment	Ice Idanan (director); Jasmine Curtis-Smith, Ruru Madrid	
N O V E M B E R	6	Nuuk	Mavx Productions, Viva Films, OctoArts Films	Veronica Velasco (director); Aga Muhlach, Alice Dixson	
N O V E M B E R	8	Barbara Reimagined	iWant originals	Chris Ad. Castillo and Benedict Mique (director); JC de Vera, Nathalie Hart, Mariel de Leon	
N O V E M B E R	8	Sila-Sila	Cinema One	Gian Carlo Abraham (director); Gio Gahol, Topher Fabregas	
N O V E M B E R	8	O	Cinema One	Kevin Dayrit (director); Anna Luna, Jasmine Curtis, Lauren Young, Sarah Carlos	
N O V E M B E R	9	Tia Madre	Cinema One	Eve Baswel (director); Jana Agoncillo, Cherie Gil	
N O V E M B E R	9	Tayo Muna Habang Hindi Pa Tayo	Cinema One	Denise O’Hara (director); JC Santos, Jane Oineza	
N O V E M B E R	9	Utopia	Cinema One	Dustin Celestino (writer - director); Joem Bascon, Enzo Pineda, Arron Villaflor, Karen Toyoshima	
N O V E M B E R	10	Metamorphosis	Cinema One	J.E. Tiglao (director); Gold Aceron, Ivan Padilla, Iana Bernardez, Yayo Aguila, Ricky Davao	
N O V E M B E R	10	Lucid	Cinema One	Natts Jadaone, Victor Villanueva and Dan Villegas (directors); Alessandra De Rossi, JM De Guzman	
N O V E M B E R	10	Yours Truly, Shirley	Cinema One	Nigel Santos (director); Rayt Carreon, Dennis Padilla, Regine Velasquez	
N O V E M B E R	13	The Annulment	Regal Entertainment	Mac Alejandre (director); Lovi Poe, Joem Bascon	
N O V E M B E R	13	Two Love You	OgieD Productions Inc., Lonewolf Films, Viva Films, CMB Film Services	Benedict Mique (director); Yen Santos, Lassy Marquez, MC Muah	
N O V E M B E R	20	Adan	Viva Films, Alliud Entertainment	Roman Perez, Jr. (director); Cindy Miranda, Rhen Escaño	
N O V E M B E R	20	Damaso	Reality Entertainment, Regis Film	Joven Tan (director); Aiko Melendez, Nyoy Volante, Marlo Mortel	
N O V E M B E R	23	Silly Red Shoes	iWant originals	James Mayo (director); Francine Diaz, Kyle Echarri	
N O V E M B E R	27	The Heiress	Regal Entertainment	Frasco Mortiz (director); Maricel Soriano, Sunshine Cruz, Janella Salvador	
N O V E M B E R	27	Unbreakable	Star Cinema	Mae Cruz-Alviar (director); Bea Alonzo, Angelica Panganiban, Richard Gutierrez,	
N O V E M B E R	27	Wild Little Love	iWant originals	Benedict Mique (director); Andrea Brillantes, Seth Fedelin	
N O V E M B E R	27	King of Reality Shows	Solar Pictures	Ariel Villasanta (director); Maverick Relova, Ariel Villasanta	
D E C E M B E R	1	Dead Kids	Netflix, Globe Studios, Pelikula Red	Mikhail Red (director); Sue Ramirez, Khalil Ramos, Markus Paterson	
D E C E M B E R	4	Bahad	Bladsmel Films Production, Bordworks Production	Bryan Wong (director/screenplay); Bryan Wong, Marvin Lim, Agusto Libuton, Ron Ron Makarunggala, Rod John Ferolino, Mark Dueñas, Cherwin Panimbatan, Rhodum Sagario, Gene Bayer, Jay Tabligan	
D E C E M B E R	4	Love Is Love	Solar Pictures	GB Sampedro (director); JC de Vera, Roxanne Barcelo, Raymond Bagatsing, Jay Manalo, Rufa Mae Quinto	
D E C E M B E R	4	Mañanita	Viva Films, Ten17P	Paul Soriano (director); Lav Diaz (screenplay); Bela Padilla	
D E C E M B E R	4	Trabungko	Pronoia Films, Sinephile Productions	Wowa Medroso (director/screenplay); Dowlson Brian Jadjuli, Cristine Arcamo, Jan Junibelle Lura, Justine Martinez	
D E C E M B E R	11	My Bakit List	Viva Films, BluArt Productions	Bona Fajardo (director); Louise delos Reyes, Ivan Padilla, Prince Stefan	
D E C E M B E R	25	Sunod	Ten17P, Globe Studios	Carlo Ledesma (director); Carmina Villarroel, Mylene Dizon, Susan Africa, Kate Alejandrino	
D E C E M B E R	25	Miracle in Cell No.7	Viva Films	Nuel C. Naval (director); Aga Muhlach, Bela Padilla, Xia Vigor	
D E C E M B E R	25	Mission Unstapabol: The Don Identity	APT Entertainment, M - Zet Productions	Linnet Zurbano (director); Vic Sotto, Maine Mendoza, Pokwang, Jake Cuenca	
D E C E M B E R	25	The Mall, The Merrier	Star Cinema, Viva Films	Barry Gonzales (director); Vice Ganda, Anne Curtis	
D E C E M B E R	25	Mindanao	Center Stage Productions	Brillante Mendoza (director); Judy Ann Santos, Allen Dizon	
D E C E M B E R	25	3pol Trobol: Huli Ka Balbon	CCM Productions	Rodel Nacianceno (director); Coco Martin, Jennylyn Mercado, Ai-Ai delas Alas	
D E C E M B E R	25	Culion	iOptions Ventures Corp.	Alvin Yapan (director); Iza Calzado, Jasmine Curtis-Smith, Meryll Soriano	
D E C E M B E R	25	Write About Love	TBA Studios	Crisanto B. Aquino (director); Miles Ocampo, Rocco Nacino, Yeng Constantino, Joem Bascon	

Color key

- – a Cinema One Originals Film Festival entry film
- – a QCinema International Film Festival entry film
- – a Metro Manila Film Festival entry film

== Awards ==
=== Local ===
The following list shows the Best Picture winners at the four major film awards: FAMAS Awards, Gawad Urian Awards, Luna Awards and Star Awards; and at the three major film festivals: Metro Manila Film Festival, Cinemalaya and Cinema One Originals.

Award/Festival	Best Picture		Ref.
68th FAMAS Awards	Aswang		
43rd Gawad Urian	Babae At Baril		
38th Luna Awards	Mindanao		
36th Star Awards for Movies	Hello, Love, Goodbye	Mindanao	
30th Young Critics Circle Citations	Edward		
22nd Gawad Pasado	(tied) Edward, Hello, Love, Goodbye, Mindanao		
18th Gawad Tanglaw	John Denver Trending		
4th Eddys Awards	not held		
45th Metro Manila Film Festival	Mindanao		
15th Cinemalaya Independent Film Festival	John Denver Trending		
15th Cinema One Originals Film Festival	Sila Sila		
7th QCinema International Film Festival	Cleaners		
5th Sinag Maynila Film Festival	Pailalim		
3rd Pista ng Pelikulang Pilipino	Lola Igna		
CineFilipino Film Festival	not held		
ToFarm Film Festival	not held		

=== International ===
The following list shows Filipino films (released in 2019) which were nominated or won awards at international industry-based awards and FIAPF-accredited competitive film festivals.

Award/Festival	Category	Honoree	Result	Ref.
14th Asia Pacific Screen Awards	Best Actress	Max Eigenmann, Verdict	Won	
14th Asia Pacific Screen Awards	Best Director	Lav Diaz, Ang Hupa (The Halt)	Nominated	
40th Fantasporto - Oporto International Film Festival	Best Director	Derick Cabrido, Clarita	Won	
23rd Tallinn Black Nights Film Festival	Best Director	Jun Lana, Kalel, 15	Won	
41st Cairo International Film Festival	Best Actress	Judy Ann Santos, Mindanao	Won	
41st Cairo International Film Festival	Best Artistic Contribution	Brillante Mendoza, Mindanao	Won	
