= Family Secret (TV series) =

South Korean television series

- Promotional poster
- Hangul: 가족의 비밀
- Hanja: 家族의 秘密
- Lit.: Family's Secret
- RR: Gajogui bimil
- MR: Kajogŭi pimil
- Genre: Family drama melodrama
- Based on: ¿Dónde está Elisa? by Pablo Illanes
- Developed by: Jinnie Choi; Park Ji-young
- Written by: Lee Do-hyun
- Directed by: Sun Do-Joon
- Starring: Shin Eun-kyung; Kim Seung-soo; Cha Hwa-yeon; Ryu Tae-joon
- Composer: Lee Sang-hoon
- Country of origin: South Korea
- Original language: Korean
- No. of episodes: 103

Production
- Executive producers: Lee Chan-ho; Song Byung-jun
- Producers: Kim Ji-yeon; Park Eun-kyung
- Production company: Creative Leaders Group 8

Original release
- Network: tvN
- Release: October 27, 2014 – April 30, 2015

Related
- ¿Dónde está Elisa? (Televisión Nacional de Chile) ¿Dónde está Elisa? (Telemundo); Nasaan Ka, Elisa? (ABS-CBN)

Family Secret (Korean: 가족의 비밀) is a 2014 South Korean television series starring Shin Eun-kyung, Kim Seung-soo, Cha Hwa-yeon, and Ryu Tae-joon. It is the South Korean adaptation of the 2009 Chilean telenovela ¿Dónde está Elisa?. It aired on tvN, premiering on October 27, 2014 on Mondays to Thursdays at 21:40 (KST).

== Synopsis ==
Jung Yun (Shin Eun-kyung) finds out that her daughter, Ko Eun-byul (Ryu Hyo-young), has disappeared on the day of her engagement ceremony. She then tries to find her, but her world is turned upside down when she discovers that her daughter was kidnapped by someone from her own family.

== Cast ==
=== Main ===
- Shin Eun-kyung as Han Jung-yun (43)
- Kim Seung-soo as Ko Tae-sung (46)
  - Lee Hyo-je as young Tae-sung
- Cha Hwa-yeon as Jin Joo-ran (late 60s)
- Ryu Tae-joon as Min Joon-hyuk (43)

=== People around Han Jung-yun ===
- Ryu Hyo-young as Ko Eun-byul / Baek Soo-jung (19)
- Choi Yong-min as Han Man-bok (late 60s)
- Lee Jung-joon as Han Jung-hoon (35)
- Lee Eon-jung as Kim Mi-yun (32)

=== People around Min Joon-hyuk ===
- Sun Woo as Sa Kyung-mi (32)
- Son Woo-hyuk as Kim Chi-joong (35)
- Shin Sung-won as Joo Chang-shik (late 40s)

=== People around Jin Joo-ran ===
- Lee Il-hwa as Go Tae-hee (48)
- Ahn Jung-hoon as Cha Sang-min (46)
- Shin Dong-mi as Go Tae-ran (41)
- Shin Ji-ho as Cha Gun-woo (23)
- Yoo Ri-kyung as Cha Yoo-ri (21)
- Yoon Chae-sung as Kang Chan (18)

=== Other people ===
- Yoo Seo-jin as Ma Hong-joo (mid 30s)
- Kim Jae-seung as Seo Min-hoo (28)
- Lee Hae-young as Jang Myung-suk (41)
- Yoo Joo-won
- Son Jang-woo

== Ratings ==
In this table, the blue numbers represent the lowest ratings and the red numbers represent the highest ratings.

Ep.	Original broadcast date	
Ep.	Original broadcast date	AGB Nielsen
Ep.	Original broadcast date	Nationwide
1	October 27, 2014	0.795%
2	October 28, 2014	0.914%
3	October 29, 2014	1.012%
4	October 30, 2014	1.257%
5	November 3, 2014	0.922%
6	November 4, 2014	0.893%
7	November 5, 2014	1.126%
8	November 6, 2014	0.993%
9	November 10, 2014	1.447%
10	November 11, 2014	0.912%
11	November 12, 2014	1.230%
12	November 13, 2014	1.111%
13	November 17, 2014	1.027%
14	November 18, 2014	1.235%
15	November 19, 2014	1.026%
16	November 20, 2014	1.241%
17	November 24, 2014	1.495%
18	November 25, 2014	1.033%
19	November 26, 2014	1.148%
20	November 27, 2014	1.223%
21	December 1, 2014	1.285%
22	December 2, 2014	1.542%
23	December 3, 2014	1.305%
24	December 4, 2014	1.488%
25	December 8, 2014	1.615%
26	December 9, 2014	1.422%
27	December 10, 2014	1.287%
28	December 11, 2014	1.371%
29	December 15, 2014	1.396%
30	December 16, 2014	1.536%
31	December 17, 2014	1.288%
32	December 18, 2014	1.636%
33	December 22, 2014	1.736%
34	December 23, 2014	1.621%
35	December 24, 2014	1.721%
36	December 29, 2014	1.671%
37	December 30, 2014	1.056%
38	December 31, 2014	1.353%
39	January 1, 2015	1.397%
40	January 5, 2015	1.371%
41	January 6, 2015	1.264%
42	January 7, 2015	1.436%
43	January 8, 2015	1.665%
44	January 12, 2015	1.576%
45	January 13, 2015	1.817%
46	January 14, 2015	1.597%
47	January 15, 2015	1.173%
48	January 19, 2015	1.709%
49	January 20, 2015	1.543%
50	January 21, 2015	1.727%
51	January 22, 2015	1.795%
52	January 26, 2015	2.096%
53	January 27, 2015	2.407%
54	January 28, 2015	2.159%
55	January 29, 2015	2.622%
56	February 2, 2016	2.632%
57	February 3, 2016	2.278%
58	February 4, 2016	2.279%
59	February 5, 2016	2.526%
60	February 9, 2016	2.820%
61	February 10, 2016	2.386%
62	February 11, 2016	2.331%
63	February 12, 2015	3.119%
64	February 23, 2015	2.253%
65	February 24, 2015	2.383%
66	February 25, 2015	2.257%
67	February 26, 2015	2.297%
68	March 2, 2015	2.003%
69	March 3, 2015	2.341%
70	March 4, 2015	2.093%
71	March 5, 2015	2.203%
72	March 9, 2015	1.940%
73	March 10, 2015	2.201%
74	March 11, 2015	1.899%
75	March 12, 2015	2.525%
76	March 16, 2015	2.110%
77	March 17, 2015	2.350%
78	March 18, 2015	2.572%
79	March 19, 2015	2.138%
80	March 23, 2015	2.334%
81	March 24, 2015	1.912%
82	March 25, 2015	2.426%
83	March 26, 2015	2.423%
84	March 30, 2015	2.210%
85	March 31, 2015	2.152%
86	April 1, 2015	2.549%
87	April 2, 2015	1.763%
88	April 6, 2015	2.128%
89	April 7, 2015	2.315%
90	April 8, 2015	2.817%
91	April 9, 2015	2.038%
92	April 13, 2015	2.035%
93	April 14, 2015	1.707%
94	April 15, 2015	1.992%
95	April 16, 2015	1.838%
96	April 20, 2015	2.219%
97	April 21, 2015	1.761%
98	April 22, 2015	2.015%
99	April 23, 2015	1.613%
100	April 27, 2015	1.835%
101	April 28, 2015	1.918%
102	April 29, 2015	1.855%
103	April 30, 2015	2.127%
Average		1.783%

- This drama airs on a cable channel/pay TV which normally has a relatively smaller audience compared to free-to-air TV/public broadcasters (KBS, SBS, MBC and EBS).
