= Mindanao (disambiguation) =

Mindanao is the second-largest island of the Philippines.

Mindanao may also refer to:

== Geography ==
- Rio Grande de Mindanao or Mindanao River, on the island of Mindanao
- Mindanao island group, Mindanao plus other islands nearby

== Military ==
- Battle of Mindanao, a World War II battle on the island
- USS Mindanao, three U.S. Navy ships

== Other uses ==
- "Mindanao", a song by Freddie Aguilar
- Mindanao (film), a 2019 Filipino film
- Mindanao, a 1968 Filipino film directed by Emmanuel Borlaza

== See also ==
- Maguindanao (disambiguation)
