= Graduation Day (2026 film) =

2026 Dante Balboa film

- Theatrical release poster
- Directed by: Dante Balboa
- Written by: Dante Balboa
- Starring: Elizabeth Oropesa; Jeric Gonzales
- Cinematography: T.M. Malones
- Edited by: John Anthony L. Wong
- Music by: Dek Margaja
- Production company: BenTria Production
- Release date: March 18, 2026
- Country: Philippines
- Language: Filipino

Graduation Day is a 2026 Philippine drama film written and directed by Dante Balboa in his directorial debut. It stars Elizabeth Oropesa, Jeric Gonzales, Aidan Veneracion, Simon Ibarra, Angelie Sanoy and Rico Barrera. The film is about a grandmother who wants to support her grandchild's dreams.

== Cast ==
- Elizabeth Oropesa as Aling Nelia
- Jeric Gonzales as Simon
- Aidan Veneracion
- Simon Ibarra
- Angelie Sanoy
- Rico Barrera
- Krisha Francisco
- Panteen Palanca
- Mygz Molino
- Daniela Carolino

== Production ==
After graduating in Bachelor of Arts in Film and Audio Visual Communication at the University of the Philippines Diliman, director Dante Balboa started filming his directorial debut with the cast and crew on March 18, 2025. He said that writing film was not new to him as he has a Master's in Communication from the Polytechnic University of the Philippines, and enjoyed joining the Screenplay Category at Palanca Literary Contest. He also said that he never thought that the Graduation Day was going to be a film because he wrote the screenplay of this film so long ago. Balboa said that he had been friends with Benjie Austria for more than 15 years, the producer of Broken Blooms, Huwag Mo 'Kong Iwan, and Fatherland.

=== Music ===
The film's theme song titled "Basta't May Pananalig Sa Kanya" was written by Dante Balboa, arranged by Simon Peter Tan, and performed by Jeric Gonzales.

== Release ==
The film was released on March 18, 2026, under Bentria Production. The film was released together with Giant, Project Hail Mary, Mudborn, The Mortuary Assistant, Urban Evil Extreme and Yorinuki Gintama-san on Theater 2D - Shinsengumi Douran Hen. And was re-released during graduation season on April 5, 2026.
