= Nasaan Ka, Elisa? =

2011–12 Philippine television drama series

- Title card
- Genre: Crime; Drama; Mystery; Thriller
- Created by: ABS-CBN Studios; Pablo Illanes; Rondel P. Lindayag; Gina Marissa Tagasa
- Based on: ¿Dónde está Elisa? (Telemundo, 2010) by Pablo Illanes
- Developed by: ABS-CBN Studios; Roldeo T. Endrinal; Raymund G. Dizon
- Written by: Agnes P. de Guzman†; Bridgette Ann Rebuca; Janice O'Hara
- Directed by: Jerome C. Pobocan; Richard I. Arellano
- Starring: Melissa Ricks; Albert Martinez; Agot Isidro; Vina Morales; Joem Bascon
- Opening theme: "Ikaw Lamang" by Martin Nievera
- Composer: Allan Dannug
- Country of origin: Philippines
- Original language: Filipino
- No. of episodes: 90 (list of episodes)

Production
- Executive producers: Carlo Katigbak; Cory Vidanes; Laurenti Dyogi; Roldeo Endrinal
- Producers: Rizza Gonzales Ebriega; Rosselle Beegee Soldao
- Editor: Ray-An Ludwig Peralta
- Running time: 30 minutes
- Production companies: Dreamscape Entertainment Television; Telemundo; Televisión Nacional de Chile

Original release
- Network: ABS-CBN
- Release: September 12, 2011 – January 13, 2012

Related
- ¿Dónde está Elisa? (2009); Sino ang Maysala?: Mea Culpa (2019)

Nasaan Ka, Elisa? (transl. where are you, Elisa?) is a Philippine television drama crime series broadcast by ABS-CBN. The series is based on the 2009 Chilean telenovela of the same title. Directed by Jerome C. Pobocan and Richard I. Arellano, it stars Melissa Ricks. It aired on the network's Primetime Bida line up and worldwide on TFC from September 12, 2011 to January 13, 2012, replacing SNN: Showbiz News Ngayon and was replaced by Walang Hanggan.

The pilot episode of this series, along with episodes 2, 3, and 5 are available on Youtube. The rest of the episodes are not yet available.

== Overview ==
Initially, Nasaan Ka, Elisa? was supposed to be part of ABS-CBN's new line up afternoon dramas; it was promoted along with Mula sa Puso and Maria la del Barrio as part of Kapamilya Gold. The tentative airing date was March 21, 2011. After a long delay, the drama finally premiered on September 12, 2011 on Primetime Bida, replacing the evening talk show SNN: Showbiz News Ngayon.

After its final episode on January 13, 2012, Nasaan Ka, Elisa? was replaced by Walang Hanggan (where Ricks and Bascon were also cast members) which premiered on January 16, 2012.

== Premise ==
Elisa Altamira (Melissa Ricks) is a beautiful and wealthy teenager. The eldest daughter of Mariano (Albert Martinez) and Dana Altamira (Agot Isidro), Elisa is lauded as the perfect daughter. Yet, she is not who her parents think she is.

One night after Mariano's party, Elisa begged for her father's permission to go out with her younger sister Chrissy (Isabella de Leon) and her cousins Santi (Franco Daza) and Edward (Aldred Gatchalian). They head over to another party at a local club, where they saw Elisa dancing gracefully. But afterwards, Chrissy, Santi, and Edward all got drunk and eventually, discover that Elisa is missing. The family hires private investigators to find out what happened to her.

== Cast and characters ==
=== Main cast ===
Cast	Character	Character Information
Melissa Ricks	Elisa Altamira	She is Mariano and Dana's 18-year-old daughter. She is the eldest of three siblings, and is being groomed to take over their family's business empire one day. She's respectful, responsible, and well loved in the community. Mariano won't admit it, but it's obvious that she is his favorite daughter. Elisa is the type of girl who gets what she wants, and tries to always please her parents. Although she is a pampered heiress, she still takes time to help out the community by participating in charity events. She is assertive, opinionated and she is what could be considered a “perfect daughter” or is she? Why would a girl everybody loves vanish without a trace?
Albert Martinez	Mariano Altamira	He is a successful business tycoon and Elisa's father, who takes pride in his family. He is a perfectionist, not only personally but also professionally. He is considered a role model and a born leader. He managed to save his father's business empire from bankruptcy, and is the family's source of strength. He is a very conservative man who is very protective of his three daughters. His greatest fear is the possibility of something destroying his "perfect" family. His world is turned upside down when Elisa disappears; it will cause him to doubt his "perfect" life and the people in it.
Agot Isidro	Dana Altamira	She is Mariano's wife and Elisa's mother. She is beautiful, demure, and always present at social gatherings. She seems like the perfect wife, and admires her husband's principles. But sometimes, she feels stifled. It is not in her nature to complain. She's always classy and poised, and manages to smile through all the obligations that come with being the wife of a powerful man. She is a good mother who always puts her family first. Because she came from a broken family, she will do anything to keep her family together.
Vina Morales	Cecilia "Cecile" Altamira-de Silva	She is Mariano's ambitious and competitive sister and Elisa's aunt. A socialite and a fashionista, she is very manipulative. She is used to getting what she wants and she'll do anything to get her way. She has a live-in partner named Bruno and a son from a previous marriage named Edward. She is very intelligent and a great businesswoman. Despite some hidden resentment because Mariano doesn't approve of Bruno, she remains a supportive sister. Her ambition is to replace her brother as the company president.
Mickey Ferriols	Viviana "Vivian" Altamira-Rincon	She is Mariano's sister and Elisa's aunt. She is the middle child and is often described as the "peacemaker" among the siblings. Although she comes from one of the richest families, she is unable to manage her money and, at one point, had a gambling problem. Viviana became a "prodigal" daughter because she squandered a lot of her family's money to sustain her gambling addiction.
Eric Fructuoso	Bruno de Silva	He is Cecile's live-in partner who comes from a poor family. He has often been called a "gold digger" because he and Cecile are from different social backgrounds. Their age difference was also an issue. He has a good relationship with the kids of the Altamira clan and is a buddy to everyone. He works for the Altamira's company, but dislikes Mariano, who never promoted him.
Joem Bascon	Cristobal Rivas	He is a police officer in his mid-30s who specializes in kidnapping cases. Cristobal is assigned to lead the investigation on Elisa Altamira's disappearance. He is an intelligent NBI agent who is so focused on work, he is sometimes described by colleagues as being "anti-social." The investigation on Elisa's mysterious disappearance causes some ghosts of his dark past to resurface. He becomes so involved with the case that he begins to deal with his own issues in the process.
Desiree del Valle	Giselle Santillian	She is a respected detective who has been Cristobal's colleague for many years. She and Cristobal work together to solve the mystery behind Elisa's disappearance. She has developed feelings for Cristobal over the years but she never revealed this to him.
Allen Dizon	Nicolas "Nick" Perez	He is Mariano's close confidant and best friend since high school who works as an accountant for the Altamira's. He and Mariano have been allies through every storm of life. Nick once joked that kidnapping Elisa would make him rich. He has remained faithful to Mariano despite everything. Nick, like many of the people in Mariano's life, has some secrets of his own.
Christopher Roxas	Jose Angel "Joey" Rincon	He is Vivian's husband, who is younger than her. He is a good person, but has personal issues. He also works for Altamira's company but unlike Cecile, he is not really good in business. He only sucks up to Mariano to get ahead professionally.
Franco Daza	Santi Rincon	He is Vivian and Joey adopted 19-year-old son. He is accepted as part of the clan but secretly feels like an outsider. He was one of Mariano's favorite, Elisa have a close relationship which close enough to make him one of the possible reasons behind Elisa's disappearance.
Aldred Gatchalian	Edward Caceres	He is Cecile's 19-year-old son from a previous marriage. He resents his cousin Santi because he thinks his family likes him better. He is lonely and thinks Elisa is the one who accepts him. He is an introvert, and possibly, knows where Elisa is.
Isabelle de Leon	Christina "Chrissy" Altamira	She is Elisa's 16-year-old younger sister. She harbors jealousy towards her big sister but ultimately looks up to her. Chrissy is a quiet, obedient daughter who somewhat loathes her father because she thinks he loves Elisa more than her.
Alexa Ilacad	Ella Altamira	She is Mariano and Dana's youngest daughter. She looks up to her sister Elisa and is so attached to her. Elisa's disappearance affects her greatly.

=== Supporting cast ===
- Jamilla Obispo as Isabel Coronado
- Tibo Jumalon as Esteban Briseño
- Cecil Paz as Lupita

=== Guest cast ===
- Crispin Pineda as Javier Garcia
- Yayo Aguila as Adriana Valdez
- Gerald Madrid as Ricardo Dela Fuente
- Andre Tiangco as Anthony Chua
- Kristel Moreno as Alex Perez
- Allan Paule as Alberto Ventura
- Neil Ryan Sese as Luis Mañalac
- Lander Vera Perez as Armand Caceres
- Arnold Reyes as Coach Justin Zialcita
- Hiyasmin Neri as Romina Rodriguez
- Rico Barrera as Abner Murillo

== Reception ==
=== Critical response ===
In a review done by Philippine Entertainment Portal, they mentioned that Nasaan Ka Elisa? "offers something new to the local TV landscape based on its crime-thriller plot."

=== Ratings ===
Nasaan Ka, Elisa? debuted at the fourth spot over-all nationwide (with a 26.7% rating or almost 27 million viewers). On its second day, the drama had 26.2% ratings.

KANTAR MEDIA NATIONAL TV RATINGS
Pilot Episode	Finale Episode	Peak	Average	Source
26.7%	25.3%	29.1%	27.0%	

== See also ==
- List of programs broadcast by ABS-CBN
- List of ABS-CBN Studios original drama series
- ¿Dónde está Elisa? (Telemundo, United States)
- ¿Dónde está Elisa? (TVN, Chile)
