= List of Nasaan Ka Elisa episodes =

Nasaan Ka Elisa? (lit. Where Are You, Elisa?) is a Philippine crime drama television series on ABS-CBN. The show aired from September 12, 2011 to January 13, 2012, replacing SNN: Showbiz News Ngayon. It is the Philippine adaptation of the 2009 Chilean telenovela ¿Dónde está Elisa? (later remade in the United States in 2010), starring Melissa Ricks.

== List of Episodes ==
No. overall	Title	Synopsis	Original Air Date	Kantar Media Rating (Nationwide)
1	"Episode 1"	What should have been another grand evening in Mariano Altamira's charmed life turns into a nightmare, as he receives alarming news about his most beloved daughter.	September 12, 2011	26.7%
2	"Episode 2"	Mariano and Dana waste no time in searching for their daughter by employing the help of private investigators.	September 13, 2011	26.2%
3	"Episode 3"	Despite Cristobal's efforts to track Elisa's trail, Mariano makes his own bold move to save his daughter.	September 14, 2011	25.5%
4	"Episode 4"	Mariano's previous employee may be involved in Elisa's disappearance	September 15, 2011	26.7%
5	"Episode 5"	Edward makes a startling revelation about Santi and Elisa.	September 16, 2011	28.1%
6	"Episode 6"	Long kept feelings and affairs are revealed as Elisa's missing case unfolds.	September 19, 2011	26.0%
7	"Episode 7"	Cristobal pursues the possible angle of Santi's involvement in Elisa's disappearance.	September 20, 2011	26.7%
8	"Episode 8"	Cecille uses Mariano's preoccupation with Elisa's disappearance as an opportunity to establish her hold in his company	September 21, 2011	26.0%
9	"Episode 9"	Santi's testimonies lean toward a different direction, and Mariano's problems are taken further by Dana's doing.	September 22, 2011	26.9%
10	"Episode 10"	Determined in finding his daughter, Mariano bestows a P5,000,000 reward for reliable witnesses who can lead in finding Elisa. Dana, on the other hand, feels disappointed on Elisa's poor performance in school especially after discovering about Isabel's involvement in issuing a fake medical certificate to cover up for Elisa's habitual absences.	September 23, 2011	29.1%
11	"Episode 11"	After Dana's confrontation with Isabel strains Dana and Mariano's relationship further, Dana seeks Cristobal for comfort, while Isabel tries to seduce Mariano. Meanwhile, as Edward becomes the prime suspect in Elisa's disappearance, Bruno helps Edward hide the evidence that could possibly reveal Edward and Elisa's real relationship. As the police apprehend Edward, Cecille manages to help free her son, but soon fails to protect him from Santi's wrath.	September 26, 2011	24%
12	"Episode 12"	Edward's involvement in Elisa's case costs Cecille her hard-earned work.	September 27, 2011	19.9%
13	"Episode 13"	Dana makes a startling discovery regarding the source of Elisa's hate mails.	September 28, 2011	22.5%
14	"Episode 14"	Elisa's disappearance unearths repressed feelings within the family.	September 29, 2011	22.3%
15	"Episode 15"	Cristobal discovers a connection between Elisa's disappearance and Mariano's affair with his secretary.	September 30, 2011	23.5%
16	"Episode 16"	Isabel's confession opens a new angle to Elisa's disappearance.	October 3, 2011	24.4%
17	"Episode 17"	The Altamiras hold a luncheon together with an attempt to patch up their relationship.	October 4, 2011	23.4%
18	"Episode 18"	Dana's desire to keep track of the progress regarding Elisa's case causes a rift in her relationship with Mariano.	October 5, 2011	22.1%
19	"Episode 19"	Doubts and anxieties flood in as Mariano and Bruno investigate on their most trusted persons.	October 6, 2011	21.3%
20	"Episode 20"	Tensions rise between Mariano and Cristobal.	October 7, 2011	22.3%
21	"Episode 21"	To affirm his suspicion with regard to his wife’s other man, Bruno discreetly follows Cecille and barges in on Nick’s condo unit. Meanwhile, Dana secretly meets with Cristobal. During a lunch out with his family, Mariano claims seeing Elisa and follows her.	October 10, 2011	21.2%
22	"Episode 22"	Cecille faces the consequences of her affair with Nick. Mariano finds information to use against Cristobal.	October 11, 2011	20.4%
23	"Episode 23"	Cecille does her best to gain Bruno's forgiveness	October 12, 2011	19.7%
24	"Episode 24"	Dana's desire to retrace Elisa's steps brings her and Mariano to an unknown trap.	October 13, 2011	22.2%
25	"Episode 25"	Learning about cyber pornography makes Dana fear for her missing daughter.	October 14, 2011	23.2%
26	"Episode 26"	Nick finds himself as the new apple of the investigators' eyes.	October 17, 2011	20.2%
27	"Episode 27"	Mariano receives shocking news as his best friend Nick gets arrested for suspicions on kidnapping Elisa.	October 18, 2011	21.2%
28	"Episode 28"	Another angle comes to a close as Nick and Alex's problems have more to do with their familial issues than with anything else.	October 19, 2011	20.8%
29	"Episode 29"	Mariano chooses the wrong moment to aggravate his marriage, now hanging by a thread.	October 20, 2011	20.3%
30	"Episode 30"	Mariano and Dana have to endure identifying a cadaver that could possibly be Elisa's.	October 21, 2011	19.7%
31	"Episode 31"	Somebody else's sorrow gives Mariano a lead to where Elisa might be.	October 24, 2011	20.0%
32	"Episode 32"	Cecille's misery is compounded when she stumbles across an unwanted person from the past.	October 25, 2011	20.0%
33	"Episode 33"	As Dana and Mariano struggle to disprove immoral accusations against Elisa, their daughter surprises them with a phone call.	October 26, 2011	20.4%
34	"Episode 34"	The investigators find strong evidence that can point them to Elisa's tracks.	October 27, 2011	20.0%
35	"Episode 35"	Dana's impulsiveness opens an opportunity for Cristobal to express his true feelings.	October 28, 2011	19.4%
36	"Episode 36"	Mariano and Dana stay strong to keep their marriage intact despite outside forces trying to sway their feelings.	October 31, 2011	18.6%
37	"Episode 37"	Mariano's sisters fall into their own troubles	November 1, 2011	19.3%
38	"Episode 38"	Vivian experiences the consequences of her careless actions.	November 2, 2011	18.0%
39	"Episode 39"	Vivian takes advantage of Dana's desperation to find Elisa.	November 3, 2011	19.6%
40	"Episode 40"	Mariano and Dana learns of a startling discovery about the real identity of the mysterious informer.	November 4, 2011	TBA
41	"Episode 41"	Investigating on Vivian leads the police to discover a new angle on the case which involves her best friend.	November 7, 2011	TBA
42	"Episode 42"	Ricardo is put in a situation where he has to reveal his mysterious partner.	November 8, 2011	TBA
43	"Episode 43"	Vivian finally learns of the truth about her husband.	November 9, 2011	18.3%
44	"Episode 44"	Joey's real identity becomes too much for Vivian to handle.	November 10, 2011	17.6%
45	"Episode 45"	Mariano gives an offer to Bruno that makes Cecille vow for revenge.	November 11, 2011	19.3%
46	"Episode 46"	Santi bravely faces Dana in order to protect his mother.	November 14, 2011	11.0%
47	"Episode 47"	Cecille uses her ace to get even with Mariano.	November 15, 2011	11.6%
48	"Episode 48"	After catching Cristobal profess his love to his wife, Mariano makes sure that Cristobal is taken out of Elisa's case.	November 16, 2011	11.5%
49	"Episode 49"	The growing rift between Mariano and Dana becomes apparent to their children. Cristobal's feelings for Dana does not go unnoticed by his superior. After getting humiliated by Dana, Isabel runs to Mariano for help, only to be rebuffed.	November 17, 2011	17.1%
50	"Episode 50"	Dana finds comfort in Cristobal. Isabel threatens to reveal Mariano's secrets if he fires her. Adriana Valdez, the new chief investigator in Elisa's missing person case, keeps a watchful eye on Cristobal's actions.	November 18, 2011	17.5%
51	"Episode 51"	Adriana's decision to focus on Elisa's profile propels the investigation forward. Mariano starts wooing Dana again. Cecille's previous marriage is officially annulled.	November 21, 2011	17.1%
52	"Episode 52"	Looking at Elisa's case from another perspective opens a new direction to the investigation.	November 22, 2011	20.3%
53	"Episode 53"	Cecille's engagement party is far from happy as tensions rise among the Altamira family members.	November 23, 2011	17.9%
54	"Episode 54"	Dana finds a startling lead in Elisa's disappearance among Mariano's belongings, prompting her to avoid him further.	November 24, 2011	TBA
55	"Episode 55"	Despite Mariano's attempts to prove his innocence, Dana continues to harbor suspicions regarding her husband's involvement in Elisa's disappearance.	November 25, 2011	19.2%
56	"Episode 56"	Dana does what she thinks is best for Elisa's investigation: telling what she found out about Mariano to the police.	November 28, 2011	TBA
57	"Episode 57"	The investigators execute a search warrant in the Altamira mansion, disturbing the family and their personal lives altogether.	November 29, 2011	22.2%
58	"Episode 58"	Cristobal finds a startling video inside Mariano's car, widening the chances of pinning Mariano on Elisa's case.	November 30, 2011	19.6%
59	"Episode 59"	Evidence regarding Mariano's involvement in Elisa's disappearance starts to mount. Meanwhile, Cristobal is running out of ideas on how to protect the Altamira family from further ruin.	December 1, 2011	19.9%
60	"Episode 60"	Mariano's involvement in Elisa's case gets voraciously eaten by the press, giving Cecille and Adriana excellent leverage to achieve their ambitions.	December 2, 2011	21.0%
61	"Episode 61"	The allegation against Mariano starts to take its toll in his work and family.	December 5, 2011	21.4%
62	"Episode 62"	The man behind Elisa’s disappearance is finally revealed. Meanwhile, Cristobal and Dana rekindle their affair.	December 6, 2011	TBA
63	"Episode 63"	Elisa's conspirator finally steps into the light. Meanwhile, a remorseful Elisa looks back at the events that led to her predicament.	December 7, 2011	TBA
64	"Episode 64"	Dana restricts her daughters' interactions with Mariano. Edwards' new object of affection has an unexpected connection to Elisa.	December 8, 2011	TBA
65	"Episode 65"	Cecille finds that being the new CEO of Mariano's company is harder than what she had expected. Meanwhile, Elisa sees the proximity of freedom from where she is kept hidden.	December 9, 2011	TBA
66	"Episode 66"	Bruno continues to abuse Elisa. Cecille learns about Dana and Cristobal's affair.	December 12, 2011	22.0%
67	"Episode 67"	Mariano's life is imperilled when he catches Dana and Cristobal in the act.	December 13, 2011	22.5%
68	"Episode 68"	Bruno hears news about his estranged mother's death. Elisa goes through lengths to ensure that her letter will reach the right people.	December 14, 2011	24.0%
69	"Episode 69"	Elisa's letter reaches the authorities, but Adriana makes sure that the result of the investigations will be in her favor. Meanwhile, Bruno starts an affair with Isabel.	December 15, 2011	TBA
70	"Episode 70"	Bruno executes his carefully laid-out plans and starts it by marrying Cecille.	December 16, 2011	21.1%
71	"Episode 71"	Mariano and the board members of the Altamira Corporation appoint Vivian as the company’s officer-in-charge. Bruno acts on his plan against Cecille.	December 19, 2011	TBA
72	"Episode 72"	Bruno's plan to have Cecille assassinated fails. In a desperate attempt to escape, Elisa manages to injure Bruno. Dana talks to Nick about Cecille's hit man.	December 20, 2011	TBA
73	"Episode 73"	Dana files a report about Bruno's involvement in Cecille's case. Bruno takes Cecille's disbelief as an opportunity to eliminate any evidence against him.	December 21, 2011	TBA
74"	"Episode 74"	Bruno uses Isabel and concocts a story to keep him from getting nailed as a primary suspect in Cecille's case.	December 22, 2011	TBA
75	"Episode 75"	The truth is out. The chase for Bruno begins.	December 23, 2011	TBA
76	"Episode 76"	Anger and jealousy get the best of Cecille, pushing her to take revenge on Isabel. Meanwhile, Mariano and Dana learn that Bruno is behind Elisa's kidnapping.	December 26, 2011	22.6%
77	"Episode 77"	Mariano is furious for not being able to decode Bruno's deception earlier on. Bruno, on the other hand, plans to use Elisa as part of his selfish scheme.	December 27, 2011	23.6%
78	"Episode 78"	Bruno records a video of Elisa's torture and sends it for the Altamiras to see. Mariano falls apart upon seeing the video, prompting him to decide to give in to the kidnapper's demands.	December 28, 2011	25.0%
79	"Episode 79"	Bruno's plan of revenge against Mariano backfires and leads to his capture. Meanwhile, Cecille traces Bruno's tracks to put an end to his infidelity.	December 29, 2011	26.3%
80	"Episode 80"	The NBI successfully entraps Bruno. Cecille nearly loses her mind as she accidentally finds Elisa and realizes that the girl is also Bruno's mistress. Mariano and Elisa have a bittersweet reunion.	December 30, 2011	25.4%
81	"Episode 81"	As Elisa struggles for her life at the hospital, Bruno's interrogation yields answers to the mysteries that Cristobal's team found difficult to solve.	January 2, 2012	25.0%
82	"Episode 82"	Mariano and Dana agonize over the now-comatose Elisa. Cecille forbids Edward from visiting Elisa at the hospital.	January 3, 2012	24.3%
83	"Episode 83"	Crissy and Ella worry about Elisa's condition. An inevitable confrontation ensues as Mariano and Cecille meet in prison.	January 4, 2012	22.9%
84	"Episode 84"	Dana urges an unconscious Elisa to fight for dear life. Bruno talks about his dream and frustration to become like Mariano Altamira.	January 5, 2012	22.8%
85	"Episode 85"	Bruno expresses his frustration in trying to gain Mariano's respect and acceptance, and reveals his satisfaction in seeing his brother-in-law's downfall. Meanwhile, Cecille plots something sinister.	January 6, 2012	24.4%
86	"Episode 86"	Edward chastises Bruno for his dishonesty throughout the Altamiras' search for Elisa. Cecille attempts to endanger Elisa’s life once again.	January 9, 2012	22.2%
87	"Episode 87"	Cecille’s subsequent attempt to kill Elisa fails. Cecille springs Bruno out of prison and admits to him that she killed Isabel and shot Elisa. Secretly disturbed by this admission, Bruno plans to leave her behind for good. Meanwhile, after overhearing Bruno talk about his intent to murder her, Cecille wages a preemptive strike against him.	January 10, 2012	25.1%
88	"Episode 88"	Elisa finally regains consciousness and tells everything to her parents, even the identity of the person who shot her.	January 11, 2012	24.4%
89	"Episode 89"	Mariano learns that Elisa's life is still at risk. A deranged Cecille kidnaps Crissy.	January 12, 2012	27.3%
90	"Episode 90"	The Altamira family mourn Elisa's demise, but they eventually learn to move on and welcome new beginnings with renewed strength and hope.	January 13, 2012	25.3%
