= 2019 Metro Manila Film Festival =

2019 film festival edition

2019 Metro Manila Film Festival 45th Metro Manila Film Festival
- No. of films: 8
- Festival date: December 25, 2019 to January 7, 2020

MMFF chronology
- 46th ed. 44th ed.

The 2019 Metro Manila Film Festival (MMFF) is the 45th edition of the annual Metro Manila Film Festival held in Metro Manila and throughout the Philippines. It is organized by the Metropolitan Manila Development Authority (MMDA). During the festival, no foreign films are shown in Philippine theaters (except IMAX and 4D theaters).

== Entries ==
=== Feature films ===
The following was the criteria used in determining the final 8 entries:
1. Artistic excellence (40.0%)
2. Commercial appeal or viability (40.0%)
3. Filipino cultural and/or historical value (10.0%)
4. Global appeal (10.0%)

The Metro Manila Film Festival (MMFF) Executive Committee announced four of the eight official entries in July 2019. The first four films were selected based from the scripts submitted until May 31, 2019.

Kampon was originally one of first four entries but was disqualified due to the late filing of its producers for a change in its leading actor after Derek Ramsay withdrew from the project. Kampon was replaced by Sunod which was the next in line entry for the horror genre.

Title	Starring	Production company	Director	Genre
First batch
Miracle in Cell No. 7	Aga Muhlach, Bela Padilla, Xia Vigor	Viva Films	Nuel Crisostomo Naval	Drama, Comedy
Mission Unstapabol: The Don Identity	Vic Sotto, Maine Mendoza	M-ZET TV Productions, APT Entertainment	Linnet Zurbano	Comedy
The Mall, The Merrier	Anne Curtis, Vice Ganda	Star Cinema, Viva Films	Barry Gonzalez	Family, Comedy, Musical
Sunod	Carmina Villarroel, Mylene Dizon	Ten17P, Globe Studios	Carlo Ledesma	Horror
Second batch
3pol Trobol: Huli Ka Balbon!	Jennylyn Mercado, Coco Martin, Ai-Ai delas Alas	CCM Productions, Quantum Films	Rodel Nacianceno	Action, Comedy, Romance
Culion	Iza Calzado, Jasmine Curtis-Smith, Meryll Soriano	iOptions Ventures Corp.	Alvin Yapan	Historical drama
Mindanao	Judy Ann Santos, Allen Dizon	Centre Stage Productions, Solar Pictures	Brillante Mendoza	Drama, Animation
Write About Love	Miles Ocampo, Rocco Nacino, Joem Bascon, Yeng Constantino	TBA Studios	Crisanto B. Aquino	Romance

=== Short films ===
A short film competition for students was organized as part of the film festival. A total of 16 short films were considered as semi-finalists with eight of them selected as the final entries. Each short film has a running time of 3–5 minutes and showcase the theme "Philippine Mythology and Regional Stories (Myths, Legends, & Folktales)". The eight selected short films were screened alongside the official eight full-length films during the whole official run of the film festival.

Title	School	Director
Bronze, Silver, Gold at Anting-anting	De La Salle University - Integrated School Manila	Angelique Veridiano
Dating App	University of Makati	Thomas Balilla
Hipos	Sagay National High School - Negros Occidental	Cyrus Carano-o
Huling Kembot ni Fernando	Centro Escolar University - Manila	Jon Diez
Manggagalaw	Centro Escolar University - Manila	John Bolivar
Pamana ni Lola	Polytechnic University of the Philippines - Sta. Mesa	Regin de Guzman and Bradley Pantajo
Tabako	University of Saint La Salle - Bacolod	Alfredo Bayon-on
The Lost Sitty	Adamson University	Julius Custodio

== Parade of Stars ==
The traditional Parade of Stars which featured floats of the film festival's eight entries took place on December 22, 2019, in Taguig.

The route of the parade, the longest in the history of the film festival at 12.5 kilometers (7.8 mi), began at the Taguig Lakeshore Park and ended at the McKinley West Open Ground. The route passed through the M. L. Quezon Avenue, MRT Avenue, C5 Road before entering the McKinley Hill through Upper McKinley Road. Then the parade passed through McKinley Parkway, 32nd Street, 7th Avenue, 28th Avenue, 5th Avenue, Lawton Avenue, LeGrand Avenue and Chateau Road. The Best Float accolade is awarded in the same day of the parade. Temporary closures were implemented on select roads at the day of the parade from noon to 7 p.m. 700 to 1000 police officers were also deployed by the National Capital Region Police Office and 1,250 personnel by the Metropolitan Manila Development Authority to secure the parade.

Vice Ganda arrived late to the parade for the float of The Mall, The Merrier due to live guesting conflict with ASAP Natin 'To at ABS-CBN Broadcasting Center in Quezon City.

== Awards ==
2019 Metro Manila Film Festival Gabi ng Parangal
- Date: December 27, 2019
- Site: New Frontier Theater, Quezon City
- Hosted by: Marco Gumabao and Bela Padilla

Highlights
- Best Picture: Mindanao
- Best Director: Brillante Mendoza (Mindanao)
- Best Actor: Allen Dizon (Mindanao)
- Best Actress: Judy Ann Santos (Mindanao)
- Most awards: Mindanao (11)

Television coverage
- Network: 5

The Gabi ng Parangal (transl. Awards Night) of the 2019 Metro Manila Film Festival was held on December 27, 2019 at the New Frontier Theater in Quezon City. The awards night was hosted by Marco Gumabao and Bela Padilla.

The Board of Jurors in this year's edition consisted of Chairman Karlo Alexi Nograles, Co-chairman Senator Bong Go, Vice-chairman Arsenio Lizaso, plus Jury Members Vilma Santos-Recto, Rachel Arenas, Joel Lamangan, Joey Javier Reyes, Christopher de Leon, Belinda Enriquez, Dr. Corazon Bautista-Cruz, Romy Vitug, Nonong Buencamino and Fr. Larry Faraon. The MMFF Hall of Fame Awards were also held as part of the larger Gabi ng Parangal that gave recognition to past award recipients who have been awarded three or more times in the same category in the past editions of the Gabi ng Parangal.

=== Major awards ===
Winners are listed first, highlighted in boldface, and indicated with a double dagger (‡). Nominations are also listed if applicable.

Best Picture	Best Director
**Mindanao – Centre Stage Productions**‡; Write About Love – TBA Studios (2nd Best Picture); Sunod – Ten17P, Globe Studios (3rd Best Picture)	**Brillante Mendoza – Mindanao**‡; Crisanto B. Aquino – Write About Love; Carlo Ledesma – Sunod
Best Actor	Best Actress
**Allen Dizon – Mindanao**‡; Aga Muhlach – Miracle in Cell No. 7; Rocco Nacino – Write About Love	**Judy Ann Santos – Mindanao**‡; Miles Ocampo – Write About Love; Carmina Villarroel – Sunod
Best Supporting Actor	Best Supporting Actress
**Joem Bascon – Write About Love**‡; Soliman Cruz – Miracle in Cell No. 7; JC Santos – Sunod	**Yeng Constantino – Write About Love**‡; Meryll Soriano – Culion; Krystal Brimner – Sunod
Best Child Performer	Best Screenplay
**Yuna Tangog – Mindanao**‡; Xia Vigor – Miracle in Cell No. 7; Rhed Bustamante – Sunod	**Crisanto B. Aquino – Write About Love**‡; Honee Alipio – Mindanao; Anton Santamaria – Sunod
Best Cinematography	Best Production Design
**Mycko David – Sunod**‡; Odyssey Flores – Mindanao; Neil Daza – Write About Love	**Ericson Navarro – Sunod**‡; Dante Mendoza – Mindanao; Monica Sevia – Write About Love
Best Editing	Best Sound
**Vanessa De Leon – Write About Love**‡; Diego Marx Robles – Mindanao; Gino Delos Reyes – Sunod	**Hiroyuki Ishizaka – Mindanao**‡; Emmanuel Verona – Write About Love; Mark Locsin (Live Sound) and John Michael Perez, Mikko Quizon, Wapak Studio (Sound Design) – Sunod
Best Original Theme Song	Best Musical Score
**"Ikaw ang Akin" from Write About Love – Written by Crisanto B. Aquino, Performed by Yeng Constantino**‡; "Itadyak" from Mindanao – Written and Performed by Maan Chua; "Inay" from Sunod – Written by Mariah Moriones, Performed by Krystal Brimner	**Jerrold Tarog – Write About Love**‡; Teresa Barrozo – Mindanao; Bogs Jugo and Robbie Factoran – Sunod
Best Visual Effects	Best Float
**Team App – Mindanao**‡; Santelmo – Mission Unstapabol: The Don Identity; The Post Office – Sunod	**Mindanao**‡
Gatpuno Antonio J. Villegas Cultural Award	Fernando Poe Jr. Memorial Award for Excellence
**Mindanao**‡	**Mindanao**‡; 3pol Trobol: Huli Ka Balbon; Sunod
Special Jury Prize	Gender Sensitivity Award
**Cast Ensemble – Culion**‡; **Crisanto B. Aquino – Write About Love**‡	**Mindanao**‡; Write About Love; Sunod

=== Special awards ===
==== Metro Manila Film Festival Stalwarts ====
- Marichu Perez-Maceda
- Boots Anson-Rodrigo
- Bienvenido Lumbera

==== Metro Manila Film Festival Hall of Fame ====
Category	Awardees
Best Actress	Nora Aunor, Maricel Soriano, Vilma Santos, Amy Austria
Best Actor	Christopher De Leon, Anthony Alonzo, Cesar Montano
Best Supporting Actress	Eugene Domingo, Cherie Gil
Best Director	Marilou Diaz-Abaya, Jose Javier Reyes, Joel Lamangan
Best Screenplay	Roy Iglesias, Ricky Lee, Jose Javier Reyes
Best Cinematography	Rody Lacap, Lee Meily, Carlo Mendoza, Romy Vitug
Best Production Design	Rodel Cruz, Joey Luna
Best Editing	Vito Cajili, Manet Dayrit, Jess Navarro, Edgardo Vinarao
Best Sound	Michael Albert Idioma, Ditoy Aguila, Rolly Ruta
Best Musical Score	Nonong Buencamino, Von De Guzman, Jaime Fabregas, Jessie Lasaten
Best Visual Effects	Road Runner Network, Inc.

==== Other awards ====
- Scratch-it Lucky Male Star of the Night – **Aga Muhlach**
- Scratch-it Lucky Female Star of the Night – **Carmina Villarroel**

=== Short Film category ===
- Best Student Short Film – **Pamana ni Lola** from **Polytechnic University of the Philippines, Sta. Mesa**
- Special Jury Prize – **Gold, Silver, Bronze at Anting-Anting** from **DLSU Integrated School, Manila**

=== Multiple awards ===
Awards	Film
11	Mindanao
8	Write About Love
3	Sunod

=== Multiple nominations ===
Nominations	Film
17	Mindanao
16	Sunod
14	Write About Love
3	Miracle in Cell No. 7

== Box office gross ==
The eight entries of 2019 Metro Manila Film Festival made a combined box office gross of ₱955 million during the official run of the film festival. The MMFF Executive Committee targeted a box office gross of ₱1 billion, with the actual box office gross figure deemed "acceptable in the industry practice". The top four grossing films in no particular order was also released namely: 3pol Trobol: Huli Ka Balbon!, The Mall, the Merrier, Miracle in Cell No. 7,, and Mission Unstapabol: The Don Identity. The box office figures for the top four team was eventually announced.

Official Overall Gross (December 25, 2019 - January 7, 2020)
#	Entry	Gross Ticket Sales
1.	Miracle in Cell No. 7	₱ 426 million
2.	The Mall, The Merrier	₱ 323 million
3.	3pol Trobol: Huli Ka Balbon!	₱ 87 million
4.	Mission Unstapabol: The Don Identity	₱ 74 million
5.–8.	Culion; Mindanao; Sunod; Write About Love	Undisclosed

Preceded by 2018 Metro Manila Film Festival	Metro Manila Film Festival; 2019	Succeeded by 2020 Metro Manila Film Festival
