= Pinoy Mano Mano: Celebrity Boxing Challenge =

- Genre: Reality, sports
- Presented by: see hosts, boxers
- Opening theme: "Pulso" by Salamin
- Country of origin: Philippines
- Original language: Tagalog
- No. of episodes: 8

Production
- Running time: 1 hour

Original release
- Network: ABS-CBN
- Release: October 27 – December 15, 2007

Pinoy Mano-Mano: Celebrity Boxing Challenge is a 2007 Philippine television sports reality competition show broadcast by ABS-CBN. Hosted by Cesar Montano, it aired on the network's Saturday evening line up from October 27 to December 15, 2007, and was replaced by Sabado Movie Specials.

The participants included TJ Trinidad, Joem Bascon, Rico Robles, Rico Barrera, Jordan Hererra, Biboy Ramirez, Eric Fructuoso and Michael Roy Jornales.

== See also ==
- List of programs broadcast by ABS-CBN
