= Son Woo-hyuk =

South Korean actor (born 1983)

Son Woo Hyuk
- Born: Son Deok-ki; 17 December 1983 (age 42); South Gyeongsang Province Changwon, South Korea
- Occupations: Actor; musical theatre actor
- Years active: 2006–present

Korean name
- Hangul: 손우혁
- RR: Son Uhyeok
- MR: Son Uhyŏk

Birth name
- Hangul: 손덕기
- RR: Son Deokgi
- MR: Son Tŏkki

Son Woo Hyuk (born 17 December 1983) is a South Korean actor. He participated in the SBS program Miracle Audition in 2011 and won the audition. He played his first main role in SBS daily drama Shady mom-in-law.

== Education ==
- Myungshin High School
- Sungkyunkwan University Bachelor of French Literature

== Works ==
=== Broadcast ===
- Miracle Audition (SBS, 2011)

=== Drama ===
- All About My Romance (SBS, 2013) as Park Boo San (Support Role)
- A Tale of Two Sisters (KBS1, 2013)
- Goddess of Marriage (SBS, 2013)
- Thrice Married Woman (SBS, 2013)
- KBS Drama Special: "The Unwelcome Guest" (KBS2, 2013)
- KBS Drama Special: "The Dirge Singer" (KBS2, 2014)
- Golden Cross (KBS2, 2014)
- Two Mothers (KBS2, 2014)
- Family Secret (tvN, 2014) as Kim Chi Jung (Support Role)
- Yeah, That's How It Is (SBS, 2016)
- The Bride of Habaek (tvN, 2017)
- Should We Kiss First? (SBS, 2018) as Kim Hyung Joon (Support Role)
- Shady Mom-in-law (SBS, 2019) as Ahn Mansoo (main role)
- River Where the Moon Rises (KBS, 2021) as Taegam (Support Role)

=== Film ===
- On the Road to SF (2013)
- Tuning Fork (2013) – as Priest – cameo
- The Throne (2015)- as Hong Nak-in
- Delicious Flight (2015) (main role)
- The True Colour of Men (2016)
- Keys to the Heart (2018) – as Eun-Ha's male friend

=== Musicals ===
- The Play (2006)
- Heartbeat (2008)
- Romantic Muscle (2016) – as O Han Gil

== Awards ==
- SBS Miracle Audition Winner
