= Fatherland (2025 film) =

- Theatrical release poster
- Directed by: Joel Lamangan
- Screenplay by: Roy Iglesias
- Story by: Joel Lamangan
- Starring: Allen Dizon; Cherry Pie Picache; Angel Aquino; Richard Yap; Max Eigenmann; Mercedes Cabral; Jeric Gonzales; Jim Pebanco; Kazel Kinouchi; Ara Davao; Bo Bautista; Abed Green; Rico Barrera; Iñigo Pascual
- Cinematography: TM Malones
- Edited by: Vanessa De Leon
- Music by: Von De Guzman
- Production companies: BenTria Productions; Heaven’s Best Entertainment
- Release date: April 19, 2025
- Country: Philippines
- Language: Filipino

Fatherland is a 2025 Philippine drama film written by Roy Iglesias and directed by Joel Lamangan. It stars Allen Dizon, Cherry Pie Picache, Angel Aquino, Richard Yap, Max Eigenmann, Mercedes Cabral, Jeric Gonzales, Jim Pebanco, Kazel Kinouchi, Ara Davao, Bo Bautista, Abed Green, Rico Barrera and Iñigo Pascual. The film is about a man who searches for his father who has dissociative identity disorder.

== Synopsis ==
The film centers around a young man who, after his mother’s death, returns to the Philippines to connect with his roots and embarks on a journey to find his father. As he searches for his father, he becomes more aware of his homeland’s current issues.

== Cast ==
- Allen Dizon
- Cherry Pie Picache
- Angel Aquino
- Richard Yap
- Max Eigenmann
- Mercedes Cabral
- Jeric Gonzales
- Jim Pebanco
- Kazel Kinouchi
- Ara Davao
- Bo Bautista
- Abed Green
- Rico Barrera
- Iñigo Pascual

== Production ==
In an interview, Joel Lamangan said that the film’s unique structure, which includes three distinct stories, led to the film having many artists. Lamangan also shared that the head of Bentria Production, Engr. Benjamin Austria stepped in when the original producer of the film backed out, he said (translated in English):

"And wholeheartedly, he assumed the responsibility. And we have a big debt of gratitude to Engr. BenTria for producing the movie Fatherland".

== Release ==
The film was released on Holy Saturday April 19, 2025, under BenTria Productions and Heaven’s Best Entertainment.
