= Jeinny Lizarazo =

- Born: January 13, 1988 (age 38); Caracas, Venezuela
- Occupations: Sports reporter, actress, model, and television presenter
- Years active: 2009–present
- Website: jeinnylizarazo.tv

Jeinny Rodriguez (born 13 January 1988) is a Venezuelan actress, television hostess, and model who frequently appears in U.S. Spanish-language TV novelas and other programs on the Telemundo, Fox Deportes and Univision networks.

== Early life ==
Lizarazo was born in Caracas, Venezuela. She began acting and dancing as a child, making her musical debut in school at age 7 playing the role of the Virgin Mary.

== Career ==
Lizarazo was discovered in Miami Beach by a TV producer who invited her to participate in a contest on the popular Telemundo network program Descontrol. She won and was chosen to be a co-host of the weekly dance music show.

Lizarazo has appeared in various novelas since 2010, notably the Telemundo network's Perro Amor, ¿Dónde Está Elisa?, Alguien te mira, and La Casa de al Lado; and the Venevision-Univision co-production, El Talismán. She is frequently a co-host, presenter, and comic actress on variety shows and talk shows, including Nitido, El Gordo y la Flaca, and Este Noche Tu Night con Felipe Viel.

In addition to modeling, Lizarazo studied at the University of Miami Journalism – Media studies (Radio and TV), including acting Meisner technique under actor-teacher Sebastián Ligarde. She also studied under Academy Award-nominated actress Adriana Barraza.

In March 2014, Lizarazo began appearing as a Miami correspondent on the Spanish TV sports program El Chiringuito de Jugones.

Jeinny Lizarazo has been Reporting Real Madrid News for ESPN Deportes 1210 since 2014, numerous occasions. is currently host of the TV show called El Pelotazo and She is social media personality in the world of football

== Filmography ==
=== Film ===
Film
Year	Title	Role	Production company
2013	Pain and Gain	Gym girl	Paramount Pictures

=== Television ===
Television
Year	Title	Role	Production company
2010	Perro Amor	Woman	Telemundo
2010	¿Dónde Está Elisa?	Reporter	Telemundo
2010	Alguien Te Mira	Benjamín's patient	Telemundo
2010	Aurora	Dancer	Telemundo
2010	Nitido	Presenter	Telemundo
2010	Descontrol	Host and dancer	Telemundo
2011–12	La Casa de al Lado	Olga	Telemundo
2012	El Talismán	Muñeca	Venevision-Univision
2012	El Gordo y la Flaca	Candi, the makeup artist	Univision
2013	Este Noche Tu Night con Felipe Viel	UPS girl and presenter	Mega TV
2013	Estudio 2	Kim Kardashian, First Lady of North Korea, others	Estrella TV
2014–present	El Chiringuito de Jugones	Correspondent	Nitro
2014–present	2014	ESPN Deportes 1210	Jeinny Lizarazo has been reporting Real Madrid, with Journalists ALfonso Quintero and Octavio Sequera ESPN Deportes
2015	El Pelotazo" and "Acceso Deportes"	Executive Producer of two Sports TV shows "El Pelotazo" and "Acceso Deportes" an TV host	
2016	Diario AS	Sport Reporter and TV host of "El Pelotazo"	Diario As US
