= Maguindanao (disambiguation) =

Maguindanao may refer to:

- Maguindanao, a former province of the Philippines currently partitioned into :
  - Maguindanao del Norte, province
  - Maguindanao del Sur, province
- Maguindanao people, in the Philippines
  - Maguindanao language, their Austronesian language
- Sultanate of Maguindanao, a former sultanate in the province
- Maguindanao massacre

== See also ==
- Mindanao (disambiguation)
