= Joem Bascon =

Filipino actor (born 1986)

- Born: Joseph Emmanuel Bascon; August 29, 1986 (age 40); Mandaluyong, Metro Manila, Philippines
- Education: Don Bosco Technical College; University of Santo Tomas
- Occupation: Actor
- Years active: 2005–present
- Agent: Star Magic (2005–present)
- Television: ABS-CBN (since 2005); ALLTV2 (since 2024); GMA Network (since 2023); TV5 (since 2020)
- Partner: Meryll Soriano
- Children: 1

Joseph Emmanuel Bascon (born August 29, 1986), popularly known by the stage name Joem Bascon, is a Filipino actor.

== Early life and background ==
Bascon was born in Mandaluyong City, the Filipino actor spent his early years as an introverted child who preferred sketching at home over playing outdoors.

== Acting career ==
Bascon's first relevance in the entertainment industry came due to his supposed resemblance to established entertainers Piolo Pascual and Sam Milby. However, he has since tried to create his own image. Speaking to the Philippine Star Supreme, he says, "To be compared with Piolo and Sam is really flattering especially when I was just starting, but I want now to be known as myself, as Joem Bascon, to finally have my own identity."

Bascon is into weightlifting, boxing and kettle bell training.

== Education ==
He graduated from high school at Don Bosco Technical College in Mandaluyong, an exclusive school for boys. He served as a basketball varsity player then. After graduating from high school in 2003, he attended the University of Santo Tomas to study Electrical Engineering.

== Personal life ==
Meryll Soriano and Bascon became partners in 2008, separated but reunited in 2019. On January 1, 2021, Bascon and Soriano's baby Gido was born on New Year's Eve 2020 and was Baptized in December 2021.

== Acting credits ==
=== Film ===
Key
†	Denotes films that have not yet been released

Joem Bascon's film credits with year of release, film titles and roles
Year	Title	Role
2006	All About Love	Ryan
2007	Batanes: Sa Dulo ng Walang Hanggan	Rico
2008	Adela	Benjo
2009	A Journey Home	Raffy
2009	Shake, Rattle & Roll 11	Father Paul
2009	I Love You, Goodbye	Raul
2010	Noy	Bong
2010	White House	Dom
2011	The Adventures of Pureza, Queen of the Riles	Gerald Tanderson
2011	Aswang	Efren
2011	Yesterday, Today, Tomorrow	TV Soap Actor
2012	24/7 in Love	Benny
2013	Blue Bustamante	George Bustamante
2013	Lihis	Ka Felix/Ka Domeng
2013	The Bride and the Lover	Mike
2013	10,000 Hours	young Dante Cristobal
2013	Boy Golden: Shoot to Kill	Gangster
2014	Ang Bagong Dugo	Emong
2014	She's Dating the Gangster	Hairstylist
2014	The End Is Bigger than Love	Dom
2014	Bonifacio: Ang Unang Pangulo	Emilio Jacinto
2014	Maria Leonora Teresa	Don
2015	Heneral Luna	Col. Francisco "Paco" Román
2015	Felix Manalo	Lucio Silvestre
2015	Haunted Mansion	Jaime
2016	Padre de Familia	Job
2016	Ang Tulay ng San Sebastian	
2016	Just the 3 of Us	BJ Manalo
2016	Kusina	Peles
2016	Siphayo	Rolando
2016	The Super Parental Guardians	Jake Alangkwenta
2016	Oro	Elmer
2017	Across the Crescent Moon	Jaypee Angeles
2017	Riding In Tandem	Angeles
2017	Historiographika Errata	Pepe
2018	Kasunduan	Franco
2018	The Impossible Dream	
2018	My 2 Mommies	Ronnie
2018	Exes Baggage	Migs
2018	Lakbayan	Jose
2018	Double Twisting Double Back	Wasi
2019	Pailalim	Bangis
2019	The Gift	Dennis
2019	Utopia	Playboy
2019	The Annulment	Sherwin
2019	Culion	Kanor
2019	Write About Love	Marco
2021	The Other Wife	Ronnie
2022	Angkas	Leo 'Satanas' Gamut
2024	Layás	Atoy
2024	Lolo and the Kid	Allan
2025	Untold	Benjie
2025	The Delivery Rider	Bernard
2026	2 Valid IDs	Omar

=== Television ===
Key
†	Denotes shows that have not yet been aired

John Bascon's television credits with year of release, title(s) and role
Year	Title	Role	Ref.
2005–2007	Let's Go!	Bob	
2005–present	ASAP	Himself – Host / performer	
2006	Love Spell: Click na Click	Harris Velasco	
2007	Pinoy Mano Mano: Celebrity Boxing Challenge	Himself - Contestant	
2007	Gokada Go!	Bob	
2007	Prinsesa ng Banyera	Teen Sigmund	
2007	Walang Kapalit	Anton	
2008	Sineserye Presents: Patayin Sa Sindak Si Barbara	John	
2008	Love Spell: The Credit Card	Obet	
2008	My Girl	Bogart	
2008	Kahit Isang Saglit	Young Ronaldo Dimaandal	
2008	HushHush	Andy	
2008	I Love Betty La Fea	Mario Calderon	
2009	Precious Hearts Romances Presents: The Bud Brothers	Juan Pedro "Pete" Labrador	
2009	Maalaala Mo Kaya: "Bola/Ball"	John Vincent Garaza	
2009	Dahil May Isang Ikaw	Ryan Fernandez	
2010	Habang May Buhay	Nathaniel "Nathan" Corpuz / Raon	
2010–2011	Noah	Judah Mondragon	
2011	Agimat: Ang Mga Alamat ni Ramon Revilla: Bianong Bulag	Tesyo Santiago	
2011	Mara Clara		
2011–2012	Nasaan Ka, Elisa?	Cristobal Rivas	
2012	Precious Hearts Romances Presents: Hiyas	Young Biano	
2012	Maalaala Mo Kaya: Pulang Laso	Alan	
2012	Walang Hanggan	Tomas Alcantara	
2013	Wansapanataym: Si Paolo at Si Apollo	Arcenon	
2013	Maalaala Mo Kaya: Ilog	Alex	
2013	May Isang Pangarap	Dante	
2013	Maalaala Mo Kaya: Notebook	Dante	
2013	Muling Buksan ang Puso	Young Bernardo	
2014	The Legal Wife	Javy Santiago	
2014	Sana Bukas pa ang Kahapon	Gerald†	
2015	Pangako Sa 'Yo	Caloy Macaspac	
2015	Ipaglaban Mo: Tiwalang Nasira	Leoning	
2015	Walang Iwanan	Roel	
2015	FPJ's Ang Probinsyano	Raymond	
2016	Ipaglaban Mo: Bayaw	Abner	
2016	Maalaala Mo Kaya: Droga	Larry	
2016	Maalaala Mo Kaya: Armas	Johnny	
2017	Ipaglaban Mo: Pabaya	Dario	
2017–2018	Pusong Ligaw	Carlito "Caloy" Cervantes	
2018	The Good Son	SPO3 George Encarnacion	
2018	Ipaglaban Mo: Puri	Jonas Macaraeg	
2019	Ipaglaban Mo: Depresyon	Lando	
2019	Maalaala Mo Kaya: Mansanas	Emman	
2019–2020	Starla	Atty. Dexter Soliman	
2020	24/7	Hector Perez	
2020	Ipaglaban Mo: Yes Sir	Ronald Naharo	
2020	Ang sa Iyo ay Akin	Francis Angeles	
2020–2021	Ate ng Ate Ko	Dr. Frank Sevilla	
2021	My Sunset Girl	Elias	
2022	The Broken Marriage Vow	Enzo Tierra	
2022	Flower of Evil	Dennis Espinosa	
2022	Mars Ravelo's Darna	Danilo Custodio	
2022	The Iron Heart	Hermes Nuevo / Jacob	
2023	Dirty Linen	Young Alejandro Isidro	
2023	TiktoClock	Co-Host / Performer	
2023	Black Rider	Jasper Alvarez	
2024	Fast Talk with Boy Abunda	Guest talk	
2024	Family Feud	Contestant	
2024	All-Out Sundays	Guest player / Performer	
2024	Magpakailanman: Freedom to Love: The Loyda and Honnie Love Story	Honnie	
2024–2025	Asawa ng Asawa Ko	Leonardo "Leon" Lozano	
2025	Mga Batang Riles	Dr. Gerald Kalinga	
2025	Magpakailanman: Unbreakable: The Charm and John Rey Love Story	John Rey	
2025	Maalaala Mo Kaya: The Maguad Family Story	Cruz Maguad	
2025	Incognito	Manuel Aguinaldo / Raven	
2025	Tadhana: Pangarap na Pamilya	Tonyo	
2025–2026	The Alibi	Young Arthur Cabrera	
2026	The Silent Noise	Manu Cortez	
2026	Blood vs Duty	Jovi Rosales	
2026	Sigabo	Young Mariano Zafra	
2026	The Loyalty Game	Matt	

== Accolades ==
Year	Work	Award	Category	Result	Ref.
2008	Batanes: Sa Dulo Ng Walang Hanggan	Golden Screen Awards for Movies	Breakthrough Performance by an Actor	Won	
2011	Noy	Gawad Urian Awards	Best Supporting Actor	Won	
2011	Noy	Luna Awards	Best Supporting Actor	Nominated	
2011	Noy	Gawad Tanglaw	Best Supporting Actor	Won	
2012	Ka Oryang	Gawad Urian Awards	Best Supporting Actor	Nominated	
2013	Qwerty	Gawad Urian Awards	Best Supporting Actor	Nominated	
2013	Blue Bustamante	Cinema One Originals Film Festival	Best Actor	Nominated	
2013	Maalaala Mo Kaya: "Pulang Laso"	PMPC Star Awards for Television	Best Single Performance by an Actor	Nominated	
2014	Maalaala Mo Kaya: "Pulang Laso"	Golden Screen TV Awards	Outstanding Performance by an Actor in a Single Drama Program	Won	
2016	Oro	Metro Manila Film Festival	Best Actor	Nominated	
2017	Ang Tulay ng San Sebastian	Young Critics Circle Awards	Best Performance (Duo) - shared with Sandino Martin	Nominated	
2017	Historiographika Errata	Cinema One Originals Film Festival	Best Actor	Nominated	
2017	Kusina	Famas Awards	Best Actor	Nominated	
2018	Double Twisting Double Back	Cinema One Originals Film Festival	Best Actor	Nominated	
2019	Double Twisting Double Back	Famas Awards	Outstanding Performance by an Actor in a Supporting Role	Won	
2019	Double Twisting Double Back	PMPC Star Awards for Movies	Movie Supporting Actor of the Year	Nominated	
2019	Utopia	Cinema One Originals Film Festival	Best Actor	Nominated	
2019	Write About Love	Metro Manila Film Festival	Best Supporting Actor	Won	
2019	Culion	Metro Manila Film Festival	Special Jury Prize (Ensemble Performance)	Won	
