= Allen Dizon =

Filipino actor, model and producer (born 1977)

- Born: Allen Dizon; October 3, 1977 (age 49); Santa Ana, Pampanga, Philippines
- Occupations: Actor; model; producer
- Years active: 1996–present
- Agent(s): Freelancer (1998–present); Viva Artists Agency (2007–present)
- Notable work: Nasaan Ka, Elisa?; Abot-Kamay na Pangarap; Sanggang-Dikit FR
- Height: 5 ft 10 in (178 cm)
- Partner: Crystle Dizon
- Website: Allen Dizon on Instagram

Allen Dizon (born October 3, 1977) is a Filipino actor, model and producer, and former member of the Viva Hot Men. Dizon originally acted in daring roles, and later became an independent film actor and producer.

In 2026, he starred as Hernan David in GMA's primetime series Taskforce Firewall and appeared as Daniel in the horror-drama film Poon.

== Early life and education ==
Dizon raised in Pampanga, he lived a simple life focused on his school activities and peers. He attended Holy Cross College in Santa Ana, Pampanga, where he was an active member of the varsity basketball team. He completed his high school education there in 1994. He moved to Manila for his tertiary education and enrolled at De Ocampo Memorial College. He graduated with a degree in Hotel and Restaurant Management (HRM).

== Career ==
In 2007, he won the Best Supporting Actor FAMAS award and Star Award for Movies in the film Twilight Dancers. Dizon appeared in movies including Dukot (2009), Sigwa (2010), Patikul (2011), Deadline (2011), and Migrante (2012). He played Sonny Burgos in the film Burgos (2013) starring Lorna Tolentino and Rocco Nacino, directed by Joel Lamangan. Dizon played as a soldier in Lauriana (2013) with Bangs Garcia and Rich Asuncion. He starred in ABS-CBN's melodrama series Doble Kara (2015), as Antonio Dela Rosa.

In 2021, while also appearing in a few drama anthology episodes, Allen was included in a handful of GMA Network series, including First Yaya and Agimat ng Agila. In 2022 he had a role in TV series Return to Paradise, playing support, alongside Eula Valdez, to the leads Derrick Monasterio and Elle Villanueva.

In 2023 he appeared on GMA Network's melodrama series Abot-Kamay na Pangarap in the supporting role of Dr. Carlos Benitez, Zoey's (played by Kazel Kinouchi) biological father, who becomes the husband of Lyneth (played by Carmina Villarroel). Dizon is also reunited with Villarroel, his co-star in Doble Kara.

Dizon produced the indie films Crossroads (Paupahan) (2008), Marino (2009) and Dukot (2009).

== Filmography ==
=== Film ===
- Hipo
- Private Parts
- Curacha: Ang Babaeng Walang Pahinga (1998)
- Babae sa Bubungang Lata (1998)
- Shirley (1998)
- Tatlong Makasalanan (1999)
- Molata (1999)
- Huwag Po, Huwag Po (1999)
- Nikilado (1999)
- Hilig ng Katawan (1999)
- Pamasak Butas (1999)
- Pila Balde (1999)
- Luksong Tinik (1999)
- Terror (1999)
- Gawin sa Dilim 2 (2000)
- Azucena (2000)
- Saranggani (2000)
- Bukas May Ligaya (2000)
- Ang Gusto Ko sa Lalaki (2000)
- Malikot Ang Agos ng Tubig (2001)
- Ika-Pitong Gloria (2001)
- Oras Na Para Lumaban (2001)
- Amorseko: Damong Ligaw (2001)
- Venus: Dyosa ng Kagandahan (2001)
- Trip (2001)
- Hayup sa Sex Appeal (2001)
- Virgin People III (2002)
- Kaulayaw (2002)
- Hinog sa Pilit, Sobra sa Tamis (2002)
- Eva, Lason kay Adan (2002)
- Sana Totoo Na (2002)
- Mama San (2002)
- Sugat, Walang Paghilom (2002)
- Tukaan (2002)
- Matamis Hanggang Dulo (2003)
- Kiskisan (2003)
- Balat-Sibuyas (2003)
- Motel (2003)
- Bold Star (2003) – Arman Reyes
- Xerex (2003)
- Tumitibok, Kumikirot (2003)
- Langit Mo Kaligayahan Ko (2004)
- Hotmen (Video) (2004)
- Erotica: Lessons of the Flesh (Video) (2005)
- Boso (2005)
- Twilight Dancers (2006)
- Ikaw Pa Rin: Bongga Ka Boy! (2008)
- Crossroads (2008)
- Room 213 (2008)
- Baler (2008)
- Loophole (2009)
- Tutok (2009)
- Marino (2009)
- Dukot (2009)
- Sigwa (2010)
- Pink Halo-Halo (2010)
- Patikul (2011)
- Deadline: The Reign of Impunity (2011)
- Migrante (2012)
- Flames of Love (2012)
- El Presidente (2012)
- Lauriana (2013)
- Burgos (2013)
- Children's Show (2014)
- Kamkam (2014)
- Magkakabaung (2014)
- Imbisibol (2015)
- Sekyu (2015)
- Iadya Mo Kami (2016)
- Lando at Bugoy (2016)
- Area (2016)
- Malinak Ya Labi (2016)
- Bomba (2017)
- Persons of Interest (2018)
- Alpha: The Right to Kill (2018)
- Jesusa (2019)
- Mindanao (2019)
- Latay (2020)
- Walker (2022)
- An Affair to Forget (2022)
- Oras de Peligro (2023)
- AbeNida (2023)
- Guardia De Honor (2024)
- Off Load (2024)
- Salum (2025)
- Fatherland (2025)
- Unconditional (2025)
- Poon (2026)
- All Right in Time (pre-production)
- I Want To Be a Doctor (in-production)
- Acetylene Love (post-production)
- Ligalig (post-production)

=== Television ===
Year	Title	Role	Ref.
1999	Sa Sandaling Kailangan Mo Ako (Book 2)		
1999	Saan Ka Man Naroroon	Rollie	
2005–2006	Mga Anghel na Walang Langit	Greg	
2006	Pinakamamahal		
2008	Kung Fu Kids	Congressman Adrian Ocampo	
2010	5 Star Specials	Various role	
2010	Maalaala Mo Kaya: Funeral Parlor	Anton	
2011–2012	Nasaan Ka, Elisa?	Nicolas "Nick" Perez	
2012–2013	Princess and I	Pratchit	
2013	Maalaala Mo Kaya: Drawing	Ronnie	
2014	Ipaglaban Mo: Amin Ang Pamana Mo	Jimmy	
2015	Ipaglaban Mo: Hanggang Sa Huli	Anton	
2015–2017	Doble Kara	Antonio Dela Rosa	
2016	Princess in the Palace	Alejandro "Lejan" Dominguez	
2018	Maalaala Mo Kaya: Duyan	Manuel	
2018	Brillante Mendoza's Amo	Camilo Molina	
2019	Toda One I Love	Tolits Dimagiba	
2019	Maalaala Mo Kaya: Palay	John Tolentino	
2019	Ipaglaban Mo: Utang	Manoling	
2019	Magpakailanman: Kailan Naging Ama Ang Isang Babae	Roxanne / Roland	
2020	Ipaglaban Mo: Tiyuhin	Oliver Monsotto	
2020	Wish Ko Lang: Nalunod	Efren	
2021	First Yaya	Congressman Subido	
2021–2022	Agimat ng Agila	Capt. Gerry Flores	
2022	Wish Ko Lang: Boso	Dolfo	
2022	Magpakailanman: My Kidney Belongs To You	Pedro	
2022	Tadhana: Hanggang Kailan	Javier	
2022	Return to Paradise	Lucho Madrigal	
2023	Wish Ko Lang: Palo	Karlo	
2023	Wish Ko Lang: Dalagita Sa Kakahuyan		
2023–2024	Abot-Kamay na Pangarap	Carlos Benitez	
2024	Lilet Matias: Attorney-at-Law	Tomas	
2025–2026	Sanggang-Dikit FR	Rodolfo Folres	
2026	Taskforce Firewall	Hernan David	

== Awards and nominations ==
=== International Film Festivals ===
Year	International Festival	Location	Result	Award	Movie
2024	10th Emirates Film Festival	Dubai, United Arab Emirates	Won	Best Actor	AbeNida
2023	2nd International Imago Film Festival	Civitella del Tronto, Italy	Won	Humphrey Bogart Award (Best Lead Actor in a Foreign Film)	AbeNida
2021	7th Art International Film Festival	Kerala, India	Won	Award of Excellence in Acting	Latay
2021	14th London International Filmmaker Festival	London, UK	Nominated	Best Lead Actor in a Foreign Language Film	Latay
2020	10th International Film Festival Manhattan	New York, USA	Won	Best Actor - Feature Film	Latay
2020	10th International Film Festival Manhattan	New York, USA	Nominated	Jury Award Best Performance	Latay
2018	25th FACINE Filipino International Cine Festival	San Francisco, USA	Won	Best Actor	Bomba
2018	8th International Film Festival Manhattan	New York, USA	Won	Best Actor - Feature Film	Sekyu
2018	16th Dhaka International Film Festival	Dhaka, Bangladesh	Won	Best Actor	Bomba
2018	11th London International Filmmaker Festival	London, UK	Nominated	Best Lead Actor in a Foreign Language Film	Area
2017	33rd Warsaw International Film Festival	Warsaw, Poland	Won	Special Jury Prize*	Bomba
2017	3rd ASEAN International Film & Festival Awards	Kuching, Malaysia	Nominated	Best Actor	Area
2016	1st Berlin International Filmmaker Festival	Berlin, Germany	Nominated	Best Lead Actor in a Foreign Language Film	Iadya Mo Kami
2016	13th Salento International Film Festival	Salento, Italy	Won	Best Actor	Iadya Mo Kami
2016	4th Silk Road International Film Festival	Dublin, Ireland	Won	Best Actor	Iadya Mo Kami
2015	2nd ASEAN International Film & Festival Awards	Kuching, Malaysia	Nominated	Best Actor	Magkakabaung
2015	3rd Silk Road International Film Festival	Dublin, Ireland	Won	Best Actor	Magkakabaung
2014	3rd Hanoi International Film Festival	Hanoi, Vietnam	Won	Best Actor	Magkakabaung
2014	9th Harlem International Film Festival	New York, USA	Won	Best Actor	Magkakabaung

- Note: The Special Jury Prize in the 33rd Warsaw International Film Festival was co-awarded to Angeli Nicole Sanoy.

=== Local Film Festivals ===
Year	Festival	Result	Award	Movie
2025	2nd Puregold CinePanalo Film Festival	Nominated	Panalong Aktor (Best Actor)	Salum
2019	45th Metro Manila Film Festival	Won	Best Actor	Mindanao
2019	2nd Subic Bay International Film Festival	Nominated	Best Actor	Jesusa
2019	5th Sinag Maynila Film Festival	Nominated	Best Actor	Jesusa
2019	5th Sinag Maynila Film Festival	Nominated	Best Actor	Persons of Interest
2018	4th Sinag Maynila Film Festival	Won	Best Actor	Bomba
2015	1st Sinag Maynila Film Festival	Won	Best Actor	Imbisibol
2014	40th Metro Manila Film Festival	Won	New Wave Best Actor	Magkakabaung

=== "The First Four" Major Award-Giving Bodies ===
- Pertaining to: Filipino Academy of Movie Arts and Sciences (FAMAS) Awards, Manunuri ng Pelikulang Pilipino (MPP) Gawad Urian, Film Academy of the Philippines (FAP) Luna Awards and Philippine Movie Press Club (PMPC) Star Awards for Movies; collectively accepted to comprise, when all won in a single year, the "Grand Slam" achievement in the Philippines.

Year	Award Ceremony	Result	Award	Movie
2021	69th FAMAS Awards	Won	Best Actor	Latay
2018	36th FAP Luna Awards	Nominated	Best Actor	Bomba
2018	66th FAMAS Awards	Won	Best Actor	Bomba
2018	41st Gawad Urian	Nominated	Best Actor	Bomba
2016	34th FAP Luna Awards	Nominated	Best Supporting Actor	Imbisibol
2015	63rd FAMAS Awards	Nominated	Best Actor	Kamkam
2015	63rd FAMAS Awards	Won	Best Actor	Magkakabaung
2015	38th Gawad Urian	Won	Best Actor	Magkakabaung
2011	59th FAMAS Awards	Won	Best Supporting Actor	Sigwa
2011	27th PMPC Star Awards for Movies	Nominated	Best Supporting Actor	Sigwa
2010	58th FAMAS Awards	Won	Best Actor	Dukot
2010	26th PMPC Star Awards for Movies	Nominated	Best Actor	Dukot
2010	33rd Gawad Urian	Nominated	Best Actor	Dukot
2009	57th FAMAS Awards	Won	Best Actor	Paupahan
2009	25th PMPC Star Awards for Movies	Nominated	Best Actor	Paupahan
2007	55th FAMAS Awards	Won	Best Supporting Actor	Twilight Dancers
2007	23rd PMPC Star Awards for Movies	Won	Best Supporting Actor	Twilight Dancers

=== Other Major Award-Giving Bodies ===
- Pertaining to: the Young Critics Circle Film Desk (YCC), the revived Multi-Media Press Society, Inc. (MMPress - formerly EnPress) and the more recent Society of Philippine Entertainment Editors, Inc. (SPEEd) & the Society of Filipino Film Reviewers (SFFR).

Year	Award Ceremony	Result	Award	Movie
2017	27th Young Critics Circle Annual Circle Citations	Nominated	Best Performance (Ensemble)	Area
2017	27th Young Critics Circle Annual Circle Citations	Nominated	Best Performance (Ensemble)	Malinak Ya Labi
2014*	24th Young Critics Circle Annual Circle Citations	Nominated	Best Performance (Individual)	Lauriana
2013	10th EnPress Golden Screen Awards for Movies	Nominated	Best Actor - Drama	Migrante
2012	9th EnPress Golden Screen Awards for Movies	Nominated	Best Supporting Actor	Patikul
2011	8th EnPress Golden Screen Awards for Movies	Nominated	Best Supporting Actor	Sigwa
2010	7th EnPress Golden Screen Awards for Movies	Nominated	Best Actor - Drama	Dukot

- Note: The 24th YCC Annual Citations for the films of 2013 were actually announced April 2015, along with the 25th Annual Citations for films of 2014.

=== Academe-Based & Regional-Based Award-Giving Bodies ===
- Pertaining to: Pampelikulang Samahan ng mga Dalubguro (Gawad Pasado), Tagapuring mga Akademik ng Aninong Gumagalaw (Gawad Tanglaw), Critics Academy Film Desk of Zamboanga City (Gawad Genio), Urduja Film Festival Social Advocacy from Pangasinan (Urduja Heritage Film Awards), Guild of Educators, Mentors and Students (GEMS Hiyas ng Sining Awards) and 3Stars Productions (Laguna Excellence Awards).

Year	Award Ceremony	Result	Award	Movie
2025	21st Gawad Tanglaw	Won	Best Actor	AbeNida
2023	4th Laguna Excellence Awards	Won	Best Indie Actor	Walker
2022	19th Gawad Tanglaw	Won	Best Actor	Latay
2020	14th Gawad Genio	Won	Best Actor	Mindanao
2020	7th Urduja Heritage Film Awards	Won	Best Actor	Mindanao
2020	2nd Laguna Excellence Awards	Won	Best Indie Actor	Persons of Interest
2020	18th Gawad Tanglaw	Won	Best Actor	Mindanao
2020	22nd Gawad Pasado	Won	Best Actor	Mindanao
2020	22nd Gawad Pasado	Won	Best Actor	Alpha: The Right To Kill
2020	4th GEMS Hiyas ng Sining Awards	Nominated	Best Actor	Mindanao
2019	21st Gawad Pasado	Won	Best Actor	Bomba
2018	12th Gawad Genio	Won	Best Actor	Bomba
2018	5th Urduja Heritage Film Awards	Won	Best Actor	Bomba
2018	16th Gawad Tanglaw	Won	Best Actor	Bomba
2017	4th Urduja Heritage Film Awards	Won	Best Actor	Lando at Bugoy
2017	19th Gawad Pasado	Won	Best Actor	Iadya Mo Kami
2017	15th Gawad Tanglaw	Won	Best Actor	Iadya Mo Kami
2016	3rd Urduja Heritage Film Awards	Won	Best Actor	Imbisibol
2015	9th Gawad Genio	Won	Best Actor	Magkakabaung
2015	2nd Urduja Heritage Film Awards	Won	Best Actor	Magkakabaung
2015	17th Gawad Pasado	Won	Best Actor	Magkakabaung
2015	13th Gawad Tanglaw	Won	Best Actor	Magkakabaung
2014	16th Gawad Pasado	Won	Best Actor	Lauriana
2013	11th Gawad Tanglaw	Won	Best Supporting Actor	Migrante
2012	10th Gawad Tanglaw	Nominated	Best Actor	Patikul
2011	5th Gawad Genio	Nominated	Best Supporting Actor	Sigwa
2010	4th Gawad Genio	Nominated	Best Actor	Dukot
2010	8th Gawad Tanglaw	Won	Best Actor	Dukot

=== Award-Giving Bodies Recognizing Achievements for Television ===
- Pertaining to: Philippine Movie Press Club (PMPC) Star Awards for TV, Kapisanan ng mga Brodkaster sa Pilipinas (KBP) Golden Dove Awards, Tagapuring mga Akademik ng Aninong Gumagalaw (Gawad Tanglaw) and Guild of Educators, Mentors and Students (GEMS Hiyas ng Sining Awards).

Year	Award Ceremony	Result	Award	TV Program / Episode Title
2020	18th Gawad Tanglaw	Won	Best Actor in a Single Performance	Magpakailanman Kailan Naging Ama Ang Isang Babae
2019	17th Gawad Tanglaw	Won	Best Actor in a Single Performance	Maalaala Mo Kaya Duyan
2019	3rd GEMS Hiyas ng Sining Awards	Nominated	Best Single Performance by an Actor	Maalaala Mo Kaya Duyan

=== Special awards ===
Year	Award	Movie That Earned Special Recognition
2026	12th Golden Screen Awards Dekada Award (2014-2024)	Magkakabaung
2025	Municipal Government of Sta. Ana, Pampanga MOPA 2025 Most Outstanding Pimpeño in the Field of Culture & the Arts - Cinema	
2022	6th Asia Pacific Luminare Awards Outstanding Actor of the Year	
2022	70th FAMAS Awards Best Actor Hall Of Fame	
2021	23rd Gawad Pasado Dambana ng Kahusayan sa Pagganap (Best Actor Hall Of Fame)	
2021	1st Diamond Excellence Awards Man Of The Year (Special Recognition for International Accolades)	
2021	5th FDCP Film Ambassadors' Night Film Ambassador Award	Latay
2019	Provincial Government of Pampanga MOKA 2019 Most Outstanding Kapampangan in the Field of Arts	
2019	Film Development Council of the Philippines SineSandaan Luminaries Icon of Philippine Cinema	
2019	11th NCCA Philippine Arts Festival Ani ng Dangal	Bomba
2019	3rd FDCP Film Ambassadors' Night Film Ambassador Award	Bomba
2018	12th Gawad Genio International Excellence Award	Bomba
2018	7th Cine Kabalen Regional Film Festival Lifetime Achievement Award	
2018	10th NCCA Philippine Arts Festival Ani ng Dangal	Bomba
2018	2nd FDCP Film Ambassadors' Night A-Lister Award	Bomba
2017	8th Philippine Daily Inquirer Indie Bravo! Award	Bomba
2017	9th NCCA Philippine Arts Festival Ani ng Dangal	Iadya Mo Kami
2016	7th Philippine Daily Inquirer Indie Bravo! Award	Iadya Mo Kami
2016	FDCP Film Ambassadors' Night Artistic Excellence Award*	Iadya Mo Kami
2016	15th Gawad Amerika Most Outstanding Filipino in the Field of Thespian Performance in Television and Film	
2016	8th NCCA Philippine Arts Festival Ani ng Dangal	Magkakabaung
2015	9th Gawad Genio International Excellence Award	Magkakabaung
2015	6th Philippine Daily Inquirer Indie Bravo! Award	Magkakabaung
2015	7th NCCA Philippine Arts Festival Ani ng Dangal	Magkakabaung
2014	5th Philippine Daily Inquirer Indie Bravo! Award	Magkakabaung
2012	10th Gawad Tanglaw Pinakakapuri-Puring Artista ng Dekada (2002-2011)	

- Note: FDCP's Artistic Excellence Award handed out during its Annual Film Ambassadors' Night is also now termed as Camera Obscura Award.

Allen Dizon's Acting Awards
- Award-Giving Bodies: Wins
International Film Festivals	13
Local Film Festivals	4
FAMAS Awards	7
Gawad Urian	1
PMPC Star Awards for Movies	1
Gawad Pasado	6
Gawad Tanglaw	10
Gawad Genio	3
Urduja Heritage Film Awards	5
Laguna Excellence Awards	2
Total Acting Awards Won	52
