= Sagay National High School =

Public high school in Negros Occidental, Philippines

Location
- Sagay, Negros Occidental; Philippines
- Coordinates: 10°53′30.2″N 123°24′39.53″E

Information
- Opened: 1947
- Grades: 7 to 12

Sagay National High School is a public high school in Sagay City.

== History ==
In 1947, the first public high school in Sagay City was opened under the command of Mayor Jose B. Puey, Sr., and Vice Mayor Amalio Cueva Sr.

The school started with 218 first and second-year students, with third and fourth-year curricula added in the following two years. The campus originally consisted of temporary classrooms in the old municipal hall. A year later, temporary classrooms were set up on the site where the present city gymnasium is located, to educate the 343 first to third-year students.

In 1950, an eight hectare school site was purchased from Januario Jison Sr., who donated the sites for the Catholic Church and City Hall. In 1954, with the opening of the Gabaldon Building, the school operation was transferred to that site. The first graduation was in 1951.

Sagay Municipal Night School opened in September 1968 and lasted until 1989. The school was converted from provincial to national in 1984. Special Science Classes (ESEP) started in 2001, initiated by Milagros Mainit, the Principal. The Open High School Program began in 2007. The Strengthened Technical Vocational Education Program (STVEP) and Special Program in the Arts (SPA) started in 2009, initiated by Ma. Teresa Q. Bingcang.
