= Rico Barrera =

Filipino actor

- Born: Frederick Barrera; December 29, 1984 (age 41); Olongapo, Philippines
- Occupations: Actor, model, singer
- Years active: 2005–2013; 2021–present
- Agent: Star Magic (2005–2009, 2023–present)

Rico Barrera (born Frederick Barrera on December 29, 1984) is a Filipino actor, the first housemate evicted from the 12 housemates of Pinoy Big Brother in 2005.

Prior to entering the house, Barrera was a singer in Japan. He was the first housemate evicted, on his 21st day in Pinoy Big Brother's house. Among the violations that put him automatically into nomination were jumping into the pool while still wearing his lapel microphone and accidentally causing a pan to catch a flame, setting off the fire alarm.

After Pinoy Big Brother, he became a flight steward and now a businessman. He became part of FrontRow International last 2012 and now belongs to Millionaires Club of FrontRow.

Barrera reportedly transferred to GMA-7 from ABS-CBN 2 last August 2009, due to his no projects of Kapamilya Network. He has now launched his first Kapuso Network TV show, Sine Novela: Tinik sa Dibdib. He was the second ex-PBB housemate transferred to GMA-7 after fellow ex-housemate Say Alonzo also transferred to GMA since 2008. But he returned to Kapamilya Network in 2010 and he is one of the cast of Magkano ang Iyong Dangal?.

== Filmography ==
=== Film ===
- Pacquiao: The Movie (2006)
- Paano Kita Iibigin (2007)
- Lalamunan (2008)
- Walang Hanggang Paalam (2009)
- Dukot (2009)
- Si Agimat, si Enteng Kabisote at si Ako (2012)
- Alfredo S. Lim: The Untold Stories (2013)
- Huwag Kang Lalabas: Hotel Episode (2021)
- Poon (2025)
- Graduation Day (2026)

=== Television ===
- Pinoy Big Brother (2005)
- ASAP Fanatic (2006)
- Gulong ng Palad (2006)
- Komiks: Inday Bote (2006)
- Love Spell: Wanted: Mr. Perfect (2006)
- Rounin (2007)
- Pinoy Mano Mano: Celebrity Boxing Challenge (2007)
- Kahit Isang Saglit (2008)
- Sine Novela: Tinik sa Dibdib (2009)
- Ikaw Sana (2009)
- Magkano ang Iyong Dangal? (2010)
- Maynila (2010)
- Bantatay (2010–2011)
- Nasaan Ka, Elisa? (2011)
- Apoy sa Dagat (2013)
