= Mission Unstapabol: The Don Identity =

- Theatrical release poster
- Directed by: Michael Tuviera
- Written by: Aloy Adlawan; Michelle Ngu; Don Santella
- Produced by: Marvic Sotto; Antonio P. Tuviera
- Starring: Vic Sotto; Maine Mendoza
- Cinematography: Miguel Cruz
- Edited by: Chrisel Galeno Desuasido
- Music by: Jay Dominguez; Richard Gonzales
- Production companies: APT Entertainment; M-ZET Productions
- Release date: December 25, 2019
- Running time: 109 minutes
- Country: Philippines
- Language: Filipino
- Box office: ₱74 million (January 7, 2020)

Mission Unstapabol: The Don Identity is a 2019 Philippine heist action comedy film directed by Michael Tuviera and starring Vic Sotto and Maine Mendoza. It was released in the Philippines on December 25, 2019 as one of the eight official entries of the 2019 Metro Manila Film Festival.

The film revolves around the exploits of Don Robert Fortun (Sotto) who forms a group to clear his name after he was accused to have committed a heinous crime as well as to retrieve a valuable pearl, the Pearl of the Orient, from his brother Benjie (Manalo) who is guarding it. The title is a play of the Hollywood movie, Mission Impossible.

== Plot ==
Brothers Robert (Vic Sotto) and Benjie Fortun (Jose Manalo) are set to steal the biggest known pearl in the world, the "Pearl of the Orient". They went to the turn-over of the pearl to the Maharlika Museum. The pearl was discovered by archaeologist Dr. Arthur Mendez (Tonton Gutierrez) and is valued at US$100 million. During a power outage, Robert successfully steals the pearl but when he was about to leave, he was knocked out unconscious. When he woke up, he realizes that the pearl is missing and the dead body of Dr. Mendez is beside him. He is arrested and sentenced to life imprisonment while maintaining his innocence.

After many years, he is released from jail and is now about to carry out his plan. With his trusted driver Kikong (Jelson Bay), he is about to embark on a mission - to seek revenge on his brother, Benjie, who is now a successful socialite. Benjie is about to return the Pearl of the Orient to the Maharlika Museum. There they hired Johnson (Jake Cuenca), a freelance professional wrestler and Zulueta (Pokwang) a professional thief who always forgets everything. He also sought the help of stunt double Bruno (Wally Bayola) to hire a computer hacker who can hack the security system of the museum. Donna Cruz (Maine Mendoza) voluntarily joins Don Robert. It was revealed that Donna, who is also known as "Anino", is Claire, the daughter of Dr. Mendez who vowed to bring Don Robert back to jail, after learning of his release.

Because the pearl is highly secured, they observe the museum especially the security of the pearl. It is secured with retina and fingerprint scanners and the voice of Don Benjie as well as lasers. Donna successfully acquires the fingerprint, photo with eyes open wide and the recorded voice of Don Benjie along with the password in an event. But, Don Benjie finds out about his brother's mission to steal the pearl and called for drastic measures by adding additional security features after Bruno confessed everything when the former was kidnapped by Benjie's men.

The Dons successfully pushes through with their mission, but Samantha (Sarah Lahbati), Don Benjie's trusted aide goes to the museum and fights with the Dons. Don Benjie's butler Wilson (Clint Bondad) tells his boss about the pearl. When the Dons are about to exit the museum, police are called in to arrest Don Robert. During a negotiation with Benjie, Robert breaks the pearl they stole, to prove that the pearl that he returned was a counterfeit. It was revealed that Don Benjie's modus is to steal artifacts in every museum and replace them with counterfeits so that everyone will know that the artifacts that is exhibited in every museum are real and not stolen. Robert managed to escape and during a chase, he crashes through a bridge and into a river.

While Don Benjie is planning his escape, he sees Robert holding the urn of Marjorie (Max Collins), Robert's wife who died while he was in prison. In an intense confrontation, Benjie admits that he killed Dr. Mendez and framed his own brother out of jealousy. He did not notice that Don Robert was wearing a body camera and is being streamed by Claire. Benjie and his men were arrested for the murder of Dr. Mendez, and the Dons have accomplished their mission. As the Dons are about to leave, Wilson came, who turned out to be Bruno. It found out that after Bruno was kidnapped, Don Robert and Bruno went to Benjie's house and knocked out the real Wilson. Then Bruno disguised himself as Wilson never knowing that he's the impostor. At the Rizal Park, Claire forgives Don Robert. The Dons celebrate after they were given a reward for returning the pearl.

After the mid-credits, Claire and Johnson was on their first date. There, Claire's mother (Lani Mercado) came and told them that the pearl is missing. It found out that it was the other half of her pearl necklace that was missing. Luckily, Johnson gave it to her. Claire and Johnson shared their first kiss and as Claire was about to kiss Johnson, it was instantly faded in black.

== Cast ==
=== Main cast ===
- Vic Sotto as Don Robert Fortun
- Maine Mendoza as Claire Mendez/Donna Cruz/Anino

=== Supporting cast ===
- Pokwang as Don Zulueta
- Jake Cuenca as Don Johnson
- Jelson Bay as Don Kikong
- Jose Manalo as Benjamin "Benjie" Fortun
- Wally Bayola as Bruno Hunyango
- Tonton Gutierrez as Dr. Arthur Mendez
- Sarah Lahbati as Samantha
- Clint Bondad as Wilson
- Lani Mercado as Mrs. Mendez
- Johnny Revilla as Maharlika Museum curator

=== Guest cast ===
- Max Collins as Marjorie
- Leanne Bautista as young Claire
