= Best Director =

Best Director is the name of an award which is presented by various film, television and theatre organizations, festivals, and people's awards. It may refer to:

== Film awards ==
- AACTA Award for Best Direction
- Academy Award for Best Director
- Asia Pacific Screen Award for Best Director
- BAFTA Award for Best Direction
- Best Director Award (Cannes Film Festival)
- César Award for Best Director
- Citra Award for Best Director
- Detroit Film Critics Society Award for Best Director
- Empire Award for Best Director
- Empire Award for Best British Director
- European Film Award for Best Director
- Golden Globe Award for Best Director
- Goya Award for Best Director
- Independent Spirit Award for Best Director
- Japan Academy Prize for Director of the Year
- MTV Video Music Award for Best Direction, called Award for Best Director in 2007
- New York Film Critics Circle Award for Best Director
- Polish Academy Award for Best Director
- Satellite Award for Best Director
- Saturn Award for Best Director

== Television awards ==
- Primetime Emmy Award for Outstanding Directing for a Comedy Series
- Primetime Emmy Award for Outstanding Directing for a Drama Series
- Primetime Emmy Award for Outstanding Directing for a Miniseries, Movie or a Dramatic Special
- MuchMusic Video Award for Best Director

== Theatre awards ==
- Tony Award for Best Direction of a Musical
- Tony Award for Best Direction of a Play
- Tony Award for Best Director
