= Write About Love (film) =

- Theatrical release poster
- Directed by: Crisanto Aquino
- Screenplay by: Crisanto B. Aquino; Janyx Regalo
- Story by: Crisanto B. Aquino; Ays de Guzman
- Produced by: Lexter Favor Tarriela
- Starring: Miles Ocampo; Rocco Nacino; Joem Bascon; Yeng Constantino
- Cinematography: Neil Daza
- Edited by: Vanessa de Leon
- Music by: Jerrold Tarog
- Production company: TBA Studios
- Distributed by: TBA Studios
- Release date: December 25, 2019
- Running time: 115 minutes
- Country: Philippines
- Language: Filipino

Write About Love is a 2019 Filipino romance film directed by Crisanto Aquino under TBA Studios and starring Miles Ocampo and Rocco Nacino. The film revolves around the collaboration of a young female writer and a veteran male indie film writer to complete an unfinished script for a love story.

== Cast ==
- Miles Ocampo as Female Writer
- Rocco Nacino as Male Writer
- Yeng Constantino as Joyce
- Joem Bascon as Marco

== Release ==
Write About Love was released in the Philippines on December 25, 2019, as one of the eight official entries to the 2019 Metro Manila Film Festival. The film is TBA Studios third entry to the film festival with Bonifacio: Ang Unang Pangulo and Sunday Beauty Queen screened at the 2014 and 2016 editions respectively.

== Reception ==
=== Accolades ===
List of accolades
Year	Award / Film Festival	Category	Recipient(s)	Result	Ref
2019	45th Metro Manila Film Festival	Best Supporting Actor	Joem Bascon	Won	
2019	45th Metro Manila Film Festival	Best Supporting Actress	Yeng Constantino	Won	
2019	45th Metro Manila Film Festival	Special Jury Prize	Crisanto Aquino	Won	
2019	45th Metro Manila Film Festival	Best Screenplay	Crisanto Aquino	Won	
2019	45th Metro Manila Film Festival	Best Musical Score	Jerrold Tarog	Won	
2019	45th Metro Manila Film Festival	Best Original Song: Ikaw Ang Akin		Won	
2019	45th Metro Manila Film Festival	Best Editor	Vanessa de Leon	Won	
2019	45th Metro Manila Film Festival	Best Editing		Won	
2019	45th Metro Manila Film Festival	2nd Best Picture		Won	
2020	15th Osaka Asian Film Festival	ABC TV Award		Won	
