= Sunod =

- Theatrical poster
- Directed by: Carlo Ledesma
- Screenplay by: Anton Santamaria
- Story by: Carlo Ledesma; Anton Santamaria
- Produced by: Paul Soriano; Mark Victor
- Starring: Carmina Villarroel; Mylene Dizon
- Cinematography: Mycko David
- Edited by: Gino Delos Reyes
- Production companies: Ten17P; Globe Studios
- Release date: December 25, 2019
- Running time: 105 minutes
- Country: Philippines
- Language: Filipino

Sunod (transl. Next) is a 2019 Philippine horror film directed by Carlo Ledesma. It stars Carmina Villarroel and Mylene Dizon.

== Premise ==
Sunod follows Olivia (Carmina Villarroel), a mother who accepts a call center job in an old building in Manila. A spirit of a young girl follows the Olivia home and takes interest in Anelle (Krystal Brimner), Olivia's daughter who has a heart condition.

== Cast ==
- Carmina Villarroel as Olivia, a single mother who takes a call center job in an old building
- Mylene Dizon as Karen, an executive in Olivia's call center
- Krystal Brimner as Anelle, Olivia's daughter who is afflicted with a heart ailment.
- Kate Alejandrino as Mimi, Olivia's coworker
- JC Santos as Lance, Olivia's team leader in the call center
- Rhed Bustamante as Nerisa, a ghost
- Susan Africa as Perla, Nerisa's mother
- Freddie Webb as Don Jaime, Karen's father
- Victor Silayan as young Jaime
- Roxanne Guinoo as Nurse Bridgette, Don Jaime's wife and nurse
- Dolly de Leon as Receptionist
- Arthur Solinap as Dr. Jess Chavez, Anelle's doctor
- Teroy Guzman as Liboro Lawyer, Karen's attorney

== Production ==
Sunod was produced under Ten17P. It was directed by Carlo Ledesma and written by Anton Santamaria. This is Ledesma's first feature film since The Tunnel in 2011. Mycko David was the cinematographer. Sunod was inspired by an urban legend in the call center industry.

Filming for Sunod, which was meant to be a submission for a film festival, was already taking place by July 2019, when the first four entries for the 2019 Metro Manila Film Festival (MMMF) was announced. The Quezon Institute, a hospital in Quezon City, was a filming location for Sunod.

== Release ==
Sunod was initially not accepted as one of the official entries for the 2019 Metro Manila Film Festival. However following the withdrawal of Kampon, In September 2019, Sunod was named the replacement entry, due to it being the next ranked film of the same genre. The film would premiere on December 25, 2019, in the film festival.
