= Mindanao (film) =

- Theatrical release poster
- Directed by: Brillante Mendoza
- Produced by: Brillante Mendoza; Carlo Valenzona
- Starring: Judy Ann Santos; Allen Dizon
- Cinematography: Odyssey Flores
- Edited by: Diego Marx Dobles
- Music by: Teresa Barrozo
- Production company: Center Stage Production
- Distributed by: Solar Pictures
- Release dates: October 5, 2019 (BIFF); December 25, 2019 (Philippines)
- Running time: 132 minutes
- Country: Philippines
- Language: Filipino

Mindanao is a 2019 Philippine war drama film directed by Brillante Mendoza starring Judy Ann Santos and Allen Dizon. It was selected as the Philippine entry for the Best International Feature Film at the 93rd Academy Awards, but it was not nominated.

== Cast ==
- Judy Ann Santos as Saima Datupalo; a Muslim mother who cares for her daughter afflicted with cancer. This is Santos' first film with director Brillante Mendoza and her first Metro Manila Film Festival film since 2012 where she starred in Si Agimat, si Enteng at si Ako with Bong Revilla and Vic Sotto. Among the challenges Santos dealt with in portraying her role is the fact that she had to often carry a 7-year-old child. She also had to take into account cultural sensitivities to be able to portray a Muslim character in a respectful manner. Santos accepted the role after she was approached by Mendoza despite having no script yet for the film at the time the offer was made.
- Allen Dizon as Malang Datupalo; A combat medic in the Philippine Army deployed to fight rebel forces in Mindanao and the husband of Saima. Dizon's character is characterized as a Maguindanaoan Muslim man by director Mendoza to show that religion and personal belief is irrelevant to one's "love for country".
- Yuna Tangog as Aisa Datupalo; the 6-year-old child actress portrays Aisa, the cancer-stricken daughter of Malang and Saima Datupalo being cared for in the House of Hope, a temporary shelter for children affected by cancer in Davao City, by her mother.

== Synopsis ==
Saima (Judy Ann Santos) cares for her cancer-stricken daughter Aisa (Yuna Tangog) while she awaits the return of her husband Malang (Allen Dizon), who serves as a combat medic deployed in the southern Philippines. Their struggle is juxtaposed with the folklore of Rajah Indara Patra and Rajah Sulayman, the sons of Sultan Nabi, who fight to stop a dragon devastating Lanao.

== Production ==
Mindanao was produced under Center Stage Production and was directed by Brillante Mendoza. It was produced by Mendoza and Carlo Valenzona. Diego Marx Dobles was responsible for the editing, Odyssey Flores for the cinematography while Teresa Barrozo provided direction for the film's music. Mendoza himself also was behind the film's production design.

Prior to making the film director Brillante Mendoza researched about Mindanao. Since the film involved the Maguindanaon folklore of Rajah Indara Patra and Rajah Sulayman the film was initially known under the working title of Maguindanao but the title of the film was changed to Mindanao since the film's theme was deemed by Mendoza to be "bigger than Maguindanao". However he conceded that the issues affecting Mindanao are complex and the film is unable to fully present these issues to the audience.

== Marketing ==
Prior to the film's Busan release a music video featuring the film's theme song "Itadyak" by Maan Chua was released. It featured colorful dances and select scenic locations from the film. Solar Pictures released the theatrical release poster for Mindanao in the Philippines on November 16, 2019.

== Release ==
Mindanao was first released outside the Philippines at the 2019 Busan International Film Festival on October 5, 2019, as part of the Icons category. It was also exhibited at the Tokyo on October 30, 2019. The film was also screened in film festivals in Egypt, Estonia, India, and Taiwan. The film premiered in Philippine cinemas on December 25, 2019, as an entry of the 2019 Metro Manila Film Festival. Due to its critical success in the film festival's awarding night, the film organizers decided to sponsor the film's screening in future film festivals.

== Reception ==
=== Accolades ===
List of accolades
Year	Award / Film Festival	Category	Recipient(s)	Result	Ref
2019	41st Cairo International Film Festival	Best Actress	Judy Ann Santos	Won	
2019	41st Cairo International Film Festival	Henry Barakat Award for Best Artistic Contribution	Brillante Mendoza (Director)	Won	
2019	45th Metro Manila Film Festival	Best Picture	Mindanao	Won	
2019	45th Metro Manila Film Festival	Best Director	Brillante Mendoza	Won	
2019	45th Metro Manila Film Festival	Best Actress	Judy Ann Santos	Won	
2019	45th Metro Manila Film Festival	Best Actor	Allen Dizon	Won	
2019	45th Metro Manila Film Festival	Gatpuno Antonio J. Villegas Cultural Award	Mindanao	Won	
2019	45th Metro Manila Film Festival	Fernando Poe Jr. Memorial Award for Excellence	Mindanao	Won	
2019	45th Metro Manila Film Festival	Best Screenplay	Honee Alipio	Nominated	
2019	45th Metro Manila Film Festival	Best Cinematography	Odyssey Flores	Nominated	
2019	45th Metro Manila Film Festival	Best Production Design	Brillante Mendoza	Nominated	
2019	45th Metro Manila Film Festival	Best Editing	Diego Marx Robles	Nominated	
2019	45th Metro Manila Film Festival	Best Visual Effects	Team App	Won	
2019	45th Metro Manila Film Festival	Best Sound	Hiroyuki Ishizaka	Won	
2019	45th Metro Manila Film Festival	Best Musical Score	Teresa Barrozo	Nominated	
2019	45th Metro Manila Film Festival	Best Original Theme Song	Itadyak by Maan Chua	Nominated	
2019	45th Metro Manila Film Festival	Best Child Performer	Yuna Tangog	Won	
2019	45th Metro Manila Film Festival	Gender Sensitivity Award	Mindanao	Won	
2019	45th Metro Manila Film Festival	Best Float	Mindanao	Won	
2020	18th Gawad Tanglaw	Best Actress	Judy Ann Santos	Won	
2020	18th Gawad Tanglaw	Best Actor	Allen Dizon	Won	
2020	22nd Gawad Pasado	Best Picture	Mindanao	Won	
2020	22nd Gawad Pasado	Best Director	Brillante Mendoza	Won	
2020	22nd Gawad Pasado	Best Actress	Judy Ann Santos	Won	
2020	22nd Gawad Pasado	Best Actor	Allen Dizon	Won	
2020	22nd Gawad Pasado	Best Supporting Actress	Yuna Tangog	Won	
2020	22nd Gawad Pasado	Best Story	Brillante Mendoza	Won	
2020	22nd Gawad Pasado	Best Screenplay	Honee Alipio	Won	
2020	22nd Gawad Pasado	Best Cinematography	Odyssey Flores	Won	
2020	22nd Gawad Pasado	Best Production Design	Brillante Mendoza	Won	
2020	22nd Gawad Pasado	Best Editing	Diego Marx Robles	Won	
2020	22nd Gawad Pasado	Best Sound	Hiroyuki Ishizaka	Won	
2020	22nd Gawad Pasado	Best Musical Score	Teresa Barrozo	Nominated	
2020	22nd Gawad Pasado	PinanakaPASADOng Pelikula sa Paggamit ng Wika	Mindanao	Won	
2020	38th FAP Luna Awards	Best Picture	Mindanao	Won	
2020	38th FAP Luna Awards	Best Director	Brillante Mendoza	Won	
2020	38th FAP Luna Awards	Best Actress	Judy Ann Santos	Won	
2020	38th FAP Luna Awards	Best Supporting Actress	Yuna Tangog	Nominated	
2020	38th FAP Luna Awards	Best Supporting Actor	Ketchup Eusebio	Nominated	
2020	38th FAP Luna Awards	Best Screenplay	Honee Alipio	Won	
2020	38th FAP Luna Awards	Best Cinematography	Odyssey Flores	Won	
2020	38th FAP Luna Awards	Best Production Design	Brillante Mendoza	Nominated	
2020	38th FAP Luna Awards	Best Musical Score	Teresa Barrozo	Won	
2020	7th Urduja Heritage Film Awards	Best Heritage Film	Mindanao	Won	
2020	7th Urduja Heritage Film Awards	Best Actor	Allen Dizon	Won	
2020	7th Urduja Heritage Film Awards	Best Actress	Judy Ann Santos	Won	
2020	7th Urduja Heritage Film Awards	Best Director	Brillante Mendoza	Won	
2020	14th Gawad Genio Awards	Best Film	Mindanao	Won	}
2020	14th Gawad Genio Awards	Best Film Director	Brillante Mendoza	Won	}
2020	14th Gawad Genio Awards	Best Film Actress	Judy Ann Santos	Won	}
2020	14th Gawad Genio Awards	Best Film Actor	Allen Dizon	Won	}
2020	14th Gawad Genio Awards	Best Film Supporting Actress	Yuna Tangog	Won	}
2020	14th Gawad Genio Awards	Best Film Supporting Actor	Ketchup Eusebio	Nominated	}
2020	14th Gawad Genio Awards	Best Film Cinematographer	Odyssey Flores	Won	}
2020	14th Gawad Genio Awards	Best Film Editor	Diego Marx Robles	Won	}
2020	14th Gawad Genio Awards	Best Film Musical Scorer	Teresa Barrozo	Won	}
2020	14th Gawad Genio Awards	Best Film Production Designer	Brillante Mendoza	Won	}
2020	14th Gawad Genio Awards	Best Film Screenwriter	Honee Alipio	Won	}
2020	14th Gawad Genio Awards	Best Film Sound Engineer	Hiroyuki Ishizaka	Won	}
2020	14th Gawad Genio Awards	Best Film Soundtrack	Itadyak - Maan Chua	Won	}
2020	14th Gawad Genio Awards	Best Film Story	Brillante Mendoza	Won	}
2020	14th Gawad Genio Awards	Best Film Visual Designer	Team App	Won	}
2020	14th Gawad Genio Awards	International Excellence Awardee	Judy Ann Santos	Won	}
2020	14th Gawad Genio Awards	Outstanding Genio Awardee	Center Stage Productions	Won	}

== See also ==
- List of submissions to the 93rd Academy Awards for Best International Feature Film
- List of Philippine submissions for the Academy Award for Best International Feature Film
