= ¿Dónde está Elisa? (American TV series) =

American telenovela

- Genre: Thriller, action, crime, suspense, mystery
- Based on: ¿Dónde está Elisa? by Pablo Illanes
- Directed by: Leonardo Galavís; Nicolás Di Blasi
- Starring: Sonya Smith; Gabriel Porras; Jorge Luis Pila; Catherine Siachoque
- Theme music composer: Tulio Cremisini
- Country of origin: United States
- Original language: Spanish
- No. of seasons: 1
- No. of episodes: 107

Production
- Executive producer: Aurelio Valcárcel Carroll
- Producer: Martha Godoy
- Production locations: Miami, Los Angeles, Malibu
- Editor: Macorix Perera
- Camera setup: Multi-camera
- Running time: 42–45 minutes

Original release
- Network: Telemundo
- Release: March 8 – August 10, 2010

Related
- Victorinos; Sin Tetas No Hay Paraiso; La Diosa Coronada

¿Dónde está Elisa? (English: Where is Elisa?) is a Spanish-language telenovela, written by Pablo Illanes, produced by TVN (Chile) and remade by the U.S. television network Telemundo and RCN Colombia. It is based on the Chilean telenovela of the same name produced by TVN in 2009.

Telemundo began airing ¿Dónde Está Elisa? on March 8, 2010 airing weeknights at 10pm/9c over about 26 weeks during the 2010 season. As with most of its other telenovelas, the network broadcasts English subtitles as closed captions on CC3.

The first sneak peek of the production was shown on Tuesday on January 13, 2010. The series was produced in Miami, Florida. The filming started on January 27 and ended in May 2010. On July 26, the series shared the 1 hour time slot with another Telemundo telenovela La Diosa Coronada. The last episode of the series was aired on Tuesday on August 10, 2010.

A question is how much of DEE is based on the successful book The Girl with the Dragon Tattoo (also known as Men Who Hate Women in English), a 2009 Swedish film adaptation of the novel Män som hatar kvinnor by the late Swedish author/journalist Stieg Larsson. DEE was written or adapted by Pablo Illanes, who wrote the Chilean version that preceded that of Telemundo. Illanes says that the inspiration of the story comes from the book and the real life drama of British native Madeleine McCann in Portugal. The list of suspects is long, and it includes family members, fellow students, and friends of the teenager who went to the same places that she used to go to before disappearing. There is a striking similarity between DEE and the previously aired Desaparecida, a limited serial drama television series from Spain.

United Kingdom TV audience demand for ¿Dónde Está Elisa? Parrot Analytics has found that the audience demand for ¿Dónde Está Elisa? is less than one-tenth of the demand for the average TV series in the United Kingdom in the last 30 days. Twitter 24.4% of all shows in this market have this level of demand.

== Plot ==
The lives of the Altamira family are changed forever. Their lives are engulfed by the events in the disappearance of Elisa (Vanessa Pose), the oldest daughter of Mariano Altamira (Gabriel Porras) and Dana Riggs Altamira (Sonya Smith).

Once she disappears, we begin to learn the secrets of every member of the family and friends; the paranoias start, histories from the past, themes that were supposed to be buried. Then the recriminations among family members start.

In the midst of family conflicts many suspects come to light, among them family members (Elisa's parents, uncles, cousins) fellow students, former and present Altamira employees, as well as friends that used to go to the same places that Elisa would frequent. Eventually, Bruno Cáceres (Roberto Mateos) will emerge as the kidnapper....

Despite the continual efforts to find Elisa, a more prominent theme is the disintegration of the Altamira clan. In the initial episode they look like a one big happy clan, but there are many problems beneath that surface which come to light. A major theme of the story is the consequences of hypocrisy.

== Cast ==
Main Cast In Order of Appearance

Actor	Character
Sonya Smith	Danna Altamira Riggs
Gabriel Porras	Mariano Altamira
Jorge Luis Pila	Cristóbal Rivas
Catherine Siachoque	Cecilia Altamira
Omar Germenos	José Ángel Rincón
Roberto Mateos	Bruno Cáceres +
Ivelin Giró	Viviana Altamira
Ismael La Rosa	Nicolás del Valle
Melvin Cabrera	Ricardo de la Fuente
Karina Mora	Gisela Cruz
Claudia Moreno	Isabel Ríos +
Rubén Morales	Néstor Salazar
Carlos Augusto Maldonado	Esteban Briseño
Vanessa Pose	Elisa Altamira +
Carmen Aub	Flor Cáceres
Mauricio Hénao	Eduardo Cáceres
Jason Canela	Santiago Rincón
Gabriela Serrano	Cristina Altamira
Tania Nieto	Olga Altamira

Special Participation

Actor	Character
Luís Celeiro	Alberto Ventura
Anabel Leal	Guadalupe "Lupita" Olmos
Mildred Quiroz	Amanda Goldstein
Maricela González	Adriana Castañeda
Elizabeth Barón	Lorena Sandoval
Robert Avellanet	Carrillo
Jorge Hernández	Ferrara

Secondary Cast

Actor	Character
Claudia Camacho	Charrita
Catalina García	
Telly Ganas	Valeria
Leticia Morales	Juana "Juanita"
Cristina Figarola	Candie
Itzel Ramos	Clara
Jorge Luís García	Police techniques
Dwayne Britton	Alex
Lavinia Castro	Norma
Karina Florez	Martha
Juan Cepero	Doctor
Ramiro Terán	Felipe Raseto
Esteban Villareal	Lombardi
Carlos Pítela	Priest
Jeinny Lizarazo	Reporter
José Santana	

== United States broadcast ==
- Release dates, episode name & length, and U.S. viewers based on Telemundo's broadcast.

Air Date	Number	Episode Title	Rating	Duration/Summary
March 8, 2010	001	Gran lanzamiento	5.7	44 minutes La familia Altamira esta celebrando el cumpleaños de Mariano Altamira. Elisa le dice a sus padres que quiere ir a un night club con sus primos. Van an el night club y Elisa desaparece. Comienza la investigacion y se descubre que Elisa y uno de sus primos se estaban besando tiempo antes de su desaparicion.
March 9, 2010	002	Pistas contrareloj	5.7	43 minutes
March 10, 2010	003	Enemigo sin rostro	6.6	43 minutes
March 11, 2010	004	Sospecha muerta	5.9	43 minutes
March 12, 2010	005	Impulsos del dolor	6.6	43 minutes
March 15, 2010	006	Secretos extraños	6.0	43 minutes
March 16, 2010	007	Juego de pruebas	6.6	43 minutes
March 18, 2010	008	Secretos develados	N/A	43 minutes
March 19, 2010	009	Secreto por descubrir	N/A	43 minutes
March 22, 2010	010	Corazonada de madre	6.7	43 minutes
March 23, 2010	011	Instinto de madre	6.5	43 minutes
March 24, 2010	012	Rival de sospechas	6.5	43 minutes
March 25, 2010	013	Secretos en peligro	6.2	43 minutes
March 26, 2010	014	Pasado de trampas	N/A	43 minutes
March 29, 2010	015	Provocaciones prohibidas	N/A	43 minutes
March 30, 2010	016	Deseos ocultos	N/A	43 minutes
March 31, 2010	017	Camino de miedos	N/A	43 minutes
April 1, 2010	018	Apagar la esperanza	N/A	43 minutes
April 2, 2010	019	Llamada del cielo	N/A	43 minutes
April 5, 2010	020	Infierno de esperanzas	N/A	43 minutes
April 6, 2010	021	Cosechar enemigos	N/A	43 minutes
April 7, 2010	022	Prueba de vida	N/A	43 minutes
April 8, 2010	023	Cobrar enemigos	N/A	43 minutes
April 9, 2010	024	Chantaje pasional	N/A	43 minutes
April 12, 2010	025	Aventura peligrosa	N/A	43 minutes
April 13, 2010	026	Traiciones de soberbia	N/A	43 minutes
April 14, 2010	027	Pasiones y provocaciones	N/A	43 minutes
April 15, 2010	028	Secuestrador misterioso	N/A	43 minutes
April 16, 2010	029	Rescate fallido	N/A	43 minutes
April 19, 2010	030	Rumbo indefinido	N/A	43 minutes
April 20, 2010	031	Principal sospechoso	N/A	43 minutes
April 21, 2010	032	Sospecha de abuso	N/A	43 minutes
April 22, 2010	033	Soborno y fuerza	N/A	43 minutes
April 23, 2010	034	Refugio y confusión	N/A	43 minutes
April 26, 2010	035	Soborno y celos	N/A	43 minutes
April 27, 2010	036	Alianzas peligrosas	N/A	43 minutes
April 28, 2010	037	Verdades ocultas	N/A	43 minutes
April 30, 2010	038	Caprichos románticos	N/A	43 minutes
May 3, 2010	039	Golpe de poder	N/A	50 minutes
May 4, 2010	040	Golpe de orgullo	N/A	50 minutes
May 5, 2010	041	Confesar pecados	N/A	50 minutes
May 6, 2010	042	Fuera de conciencia	N/A	50 minutes
May 11, 2010	043	Culpabilidad segura	N/A	43 minutes
May 12, 2010	044	Soberbia castigada	N/A	43 minutes
May 14, 2010	045	Condena dudosa	N/A	43 minutes
May 17, 2010	046	Amante y raptor	N/A	43 minutes
May 18, 2010	047	Autor intelectual	N/A	43 minutes
May 19, 2010	048	Ruego íntimo	N/A	43 minutes
May 20, 2010	049	Descuido fatal	N/A	43 minutes
May 21, 2010	050	Liberar rastros	N/A	43 minutes
May 24, 2010	051	Rastros de instinto	N/A	43 minutes
May 25, 2010	052	Riesgo por amor	N/A	43 minutes
May 26, 2010	053	Derecho criminal	N/A	43 minutes
May 27, 2010	054	Verdades al descubierto	N/A	43 minutes
May 28, 2010	055	Crímen oculto	N/A	43 minutes
May 31, 2010	056	Desesperación criminal	N/A	43 minutes
June 1, 2010	057	Romper el silencio	N/A	43 minutes
June 2, 2010	058	Héroe y detective	N/A	43 minutes
June 3, 2010	059	Pase de libertad	N/A	43 minutes
June 4, 2010	060	Gesto de nobleza	N/A	43 minutes
June 7, 2010	061	Testimonios delictivos	N/A	43 minutes
June 8, 2010	062	Estado de coma	N/A	43 minutes
June 9, 2010	063	Acorralados	N/A	43 minutes
June 10, 2010	064	Juego de evidencia	N/A	43 minutes
June 11, 2010	065	Operación vital	N/A	43 minutes
June 14, 2010	066	Sueños mortales	N/A	43 minutes
June 15, 2010	067	Despedida mortal	N/A	43 minutes
June 16, 2010	068	Sombra de culpa	N/A	43 minutes
June 17, 2010	069	Sed de venganza	N/A	43 minutes
June 18, 2010	070	Cargos irremediables	N/A	43 minutes
June 21, 2010	071	Infierno de inocentes	N/A	43 minutes
June 22, 2010	072	Prueba de polígrafo	N/A	43 minutes
June 23, 2010	073	Confesión intensa	N/A	43 minutes
June 24, 2010	074	Trampa de instintos	N/A	43 minutes
June 25, 2010	075	Fantasmas de adicción	N/A	43 minutes
June 28, 2010	076	Verdades reveladas	N/A	43 minutes
June 29, 2010	077	Visiones reales	N/A	43 minutes
June 30, 2010	078	Armas sensibles	N/A	43 minutes
July 1, 2010	079	Intimidad pública	N/A	43 minutes
July 2, 2010	080	Comprar testigos	N/A	43 minutes
July 5, 2010	081	Juicio de traiciones	N/A	43 minutes
July 6, 2010	082	Evadir culpas	N/A	43 minutes
July 7, 2010	083	Pruebas falsas	N/A	43 minutes
July 8, 2010	084	Rastros del instinto	N/A	43 minutes
July 9, 2010	085	Aliados de rabia	N/A	43 minutes
July 12, 2010	086	Delito femenino	N/A	43 minutes
July 13, 2010	087	Mentiras descubiertas	N/A	43 minutes
July 14, 2010	088	Sin salida	N/A	43 minutes
July 15, 2010	089	Cinismo asesino	N/A	43 minutes
July 16, 2010	090	Impacto de traiciones	N/A	43 minutes
July 19, 2010	091	Asesinato doble	N/A	43 minutes
July 20, 2010	092	Exigencias de madre	8.2	43 minutes
July 21, 2010	093	Autodestrucción	N/A	43 minutes
July 22, 2010	094	Complicidad enfermiza	N/A	43 minutes
July 23, 2010	095	Trampa venenosa	N/A	43 minutes
July 26, 2010	096	Golpe final	N/A	43 minutes
July 27, 2010	097	Limpiar caminos	N/A	43 minutes
July 28, 2010	098	Lágrimas falsas	N/A	43 minutes
July 29, 2010	099	Mentiras débiles	N/A	43 minutes
July 30, 2010	100	Orden de detención	N/A	43 minutes
August 2, 2010	101	Crimen al descubierto	8.4	43 minutes
August 3, 2010	102	Limite de locura	8.4	43 minutes
August 4, 2010	103	Huída frustrada	9.2	43 minutes
August 5, 2010	104	Fuga incierta	N/A	43 minutes
August 6, 2010	105	Cita final	N/A	43 minutes
August 9, 2010	106	Decision vital	N/A	43 minutes
August 10, 2010	107	Gran final	8.6	43 minutes
