= On the Job (miniseries) =

Philippine television series

- Genre: Neo-noir; Conspiracy; Crime thriller; Political thriller; Action
- Created by: Erik Matti; Michiko Yamamoto
- Written by: Erik Matti; Michiko Yamamoto
- Directed by: Erik Matti
- Starring: Joel Torre; John Arcilla; Piolo Pascual; Dennis Trillo; Gerald Anderson; Joey Marquez
- Composers: Erwin Romulo; Malek Lopez; Arvin Nogueras
- Country of origin: Philippines
- Original language: Filipino
- No. of seasons: 1
- No. of episodes: 6

Production
- Executive producers: Ronald "Dondon" Monteverde; Erik Matti; Clement Schwebig; Magdalene Ew; Joe Caliro; Quark Henares
- Producer: Erik Matti
- Cinematography: Francis Ricardo Buhay III; Neil Derrick Bion
- Editor: Jay Halili
- Camera setup: Single-camera
- Running time: 45–63 minutes
- Production companies: Reality MM Studios; Globe Studios; ABS-CBN Studios (uncredited); Star Cinema (uncredited); Warner Bros. Television (uncredited)

Original release
- Network: HBO Go
- Release: September 12 – October 3, 2021

On the Job is a six-part Philippine miniseries created by Erik Matti and Michiko Yamamoto for HBO Asia Originals. It was adapted from the two On the Job films: the 2013 film and its sequel The Missing 8, both of which are directed by Matti; the first two episodes are a recut of the first film.

It premiered on HBO Go on September 12, 2021.

== Premise ==
An official premise from HBO Go:

On The Job centers around crime syndicates that temporarily release contracted prison inmates to carry out political assassinations for those in power, except that the crime syndicates are run by politicians.

== Cast ==
=== Main ===
- Joel Torre as Mario "Tatang" Maghari
- John Arcilla as Sisoy Salas
- Joey Marquez as Sgt. Joaquin Acosta
- Dennis Trillo as Roman Rubio
- Piolo Pascual as Francis Coronel Jr.
- Gerald Anderson as Daniel
- Leo Martinez as General Pacheco
- Dante Rivero as Mayor Pedring Eusebio
- Rayver Cruz as Bernabe

=== Recurring ===
Introduced in On the Job (2013)

- Angel Aquino as Lulette
- Shaina Magdayao as Nicky
- Empress Schuck as Tina
- Michael de Mesa as Congressman Manrique
- Vivian Velez as Thelma
- Lito Pimentel as Pol

Introduced in The Missing 8 (2021)

- Christopher de Leon as Arnel Pangan
- Lotlot de Leon as Weng
- Agot Isidro as Senator Alice Samson
- Andrea Brillantes as Diane Salas
- Wendell Ramos as Senator Bernie Eusebio
- Megan Young as Lauren Eusebio
- Isabelle de Leon as Joni Salas
- Sol Cruz as Obet

Ricky Davao, William Martinez, Vandolph Quizon, Eric Fructuoso, and Ina Feleo are all cast in unspecified roles.

== Production ==
While The Missing 8 was initially planned to have an official theatrical release both domestically and internationally, continuous closures of movie theaters across the Philippines at that time amidst the COVID-19 pandemic has placed the film's distribution process in limbo. Director Erik Matti once said that he and his crew did consider splitting the film in two parts during post-production to reduce pacing issues and to ease local audiences' viewing experience once movie theaters in the Philippines re-open during the pandemic. He also stated that they have the option of turning the film into a four-episode series and selling it to television distributors or streaming services should the film fail to secure a theatrical release.

In August 2021, WarnerMedia Asia acquired the distribution rights to the sequel and the first film. Matti was then commissioned to re-edit the films into a six-part HBO Asia original miniseries; with this, he was able to recycle all unused and deleted scenes from the first film, creating a director's cut, which will be released as the first two episodes on its Asian subsidiary streaming service HBO Go.

== Release ==
On the Job was released as HBO Asia original miniseries on its streaming service HBO Go. The first three episodes were released on September 12, 2021, with subsequent episodes released in Sundays till October 3, 2021.

== Episodes ==
No.	Title	Directed by	Written by	Original release date
1	"Tatang"	Erik Matti	Story by : Erik Matti; Teleplay by : Michiko Yamamoto & Erik Matti	September 12, 2021
Prisoners Tatang and his protege Daniel are temporarily released from jail to carry out a series of assassinations for a powerful politician. Veteran cop Joaquin gets on the case, but his efforts are thwarted when young hotshot detective Francis steps in. The bickering law enforcers pick up the assassins’ trail and attempt to intercept them at their next target.
2	"Acosta"	Erik Matti	Story by : Erik Matti; Teleplay by : Michiko Yamamoto & Erik Matti	September 12, 2021
As the hunt for the assassins continues, Joaquin stands firm on his duties as a cop while Francis faces immense pressure from his politician father-in-law and his powerful ally General Pacheco. Tatang reflects on the possibility of rebuilding his family and having a future outside the prison while Daniel, having gained the trust of their employers, starts getting his own missions.
3	"Arnel"	Erik Matti	Michiko Yamamoto	September 12, 2021
Evidence about the conspiracy makes it all the way to the town of La Paz, where publisher Arnel Pangan’s newspaper is beleaguered because of his political beliefs, to the dismay of his editor, seasoned journalist, and staunch government supporter Sisoy Salas. The harassment soon escalates into a bloody incident.
4	"Pedring"	Erik Matti	Michiko Yamamoto	September 19, 2021
Sisoy searches for his other missing colleagues, but his hopes of seeing them again diminish as the days go by. An eyewitness comes forward as the criminal syndicate quickly eliminates loose ends. In prison, Roman struggles with the messy internal politics of jail while hiding a key piece of evidence that Sisoy needs.
5	"Roman"	Erik Matti	Michiko Yamamoto	September 26, 2021
Sisoy and Weng get a breakthrough in their investigation when they finally connect their colleague’s disappearance to powerful political figures. Roman receives a life sentence, pulling him even deeper into the gun-for-hire business. He is given another hit mission with his new cellmate, Popoy.
6	"Sisoy"	Erik Matti	Michiko Yamamoto	October 3, 2021
Sisoy and Roman help each other out in trying to get to the root of the killings. Amidst suspicions from his employers that he is ratting them out, Roman decides to fight for his own freedom. Sisoy executes a daring plan to expose political crimes, endangering his own family in the process.

== Awards and nominations ==
Year	Award	Category	Nominee	Result	Ref.
2022	Asian Academy Creative Awards	Best Actor in a Leading Role	John Arcilla	Nominated	
2022	Asian Academy Creative Awards	Best Direction (Fiction)	Erik Matti	Nominated	
2022	Asian Academy Creative Awards	Best Drama Series	On the Job	Nominated	
2022	Asian Academy Creative Awards	Best Screenplay	Michiko Yamamoto	Nominated	
2022	International Emmy Awards	Best TV Movie or Miniseries	On the Job	Nominated	
