= On the Job (disambiguation) =

On the Job is a 2013 Filipino neo-noir crime thriller film.

On the Job may also refer to:

- On-the-job training
- "On the Job" (CSI: NY), an episode of the TV series CSI: NY
- On the Job (miniseries), a 2021 Filipino HBO miniseries

== See also ==
- On the Job: The Missing 8, also known as On the Job 2, a 2021 Philippine film, sequel to the 2013 film
