= AgostoDos Pictures =

Independent film studio

- Type: Private
- Industry: Entertainment
- Founded: December 25, 2011; 14 years ago
- Founder: Dingdong Dantes
- Headquarters: Quezon City, Philippines
- Area served: Worldwide
- Key people: Jose Sixto Gonzalez Dantes III (Chairman and CEO)
- Products: Motion pictures

AgostoDos Pictures is a Filipino independent film production company based in Quezon City. It was founded on December 25, 2011 by actor Dingdong Dantes. The name of the film studio is derived from the actor's birthday, August 2.

== Filmography ==
=== Films ===
Year	Title	Released date	Cast(s)	Associated film studio(s)	Director(s)
2011	Segunda Mano	December 25	Kris Aquino; Dingdong Dantes; Angelica Panganiban	Star Cinema; MJM Productions	Joyce E. Bernal
2012	Tiktik: The Aswang Chronicles	October 8	Dingdong Dantes; Lovi Poe; Joey Marquez; Janice de Belen; Roi Vinzon	Reality Entertainment; PostManila Productions; Mothership, Inc. GMA Films	Erik Matti
2014	Kubot: The Aswang Chronicles 2	December 25	Dingdong Dantes; Isabelle Daza	Reality Entertainment; PostManila Productions; Mothership, Inc. GMA Films	Erik Matti
2021	A Hard Day	December 25	Dingdong Dantes; John Arcilla	uncredited; distributed by: Viva Films	Lawrence Fajardo
2023	Rewind	December 25	Dingdong Dantes; Marian Rivera	Star Cinema; APT Entertainment	Mae Cruz-Alviar
2025	Only We Know	June 11	Dingdong Dantes; Charo Santos-Concio	Star Cinema; Cornerstone Studios; 7K Entertainment	Irene Villamor

=== Television ===
Year	Title	Network	Notes
2022–2024	Jose & Maria's Bonggang Villa	GMA Network	co-production with APT Entertainment and GMA Entertainment Group
