= BuyBust: The Undesirables =

Upcoming Philippine action thriller television series

- Genre: Action thriller
- Written by: Michiko Yamamoto
- Directed by: Erik Matti
- Starring: Anne Curtis; Gerald Anderson
- Country of origin: Philippines
- Original language: Filipino

Production
- Production companies: Studio Viva; Reality MM Studios

Original release
- Network: Netflix

Related
- BuyBust

BuyBust: The Undesirables is a 2026 upcoming Philippine action thriller television series produced by Studio Viva and Reality MM Studios and directed by Erik Matti. It is a sequel and a spin-off to the 2018 film BuyBust. The show marks the first collaboration between Matti and Netflix. It stars Anne Curtis and Gerald Anderson, and is scheduled to be released in 2026.

== Premise ==
The story focuses on Nina Manigan, a former police officer. She forms an alliance with a corporate outcast. They are brought together by the murder of a senator's daughter. The two characters engage in a manhunt for a mysterious drug lord known as "Judas". The events take place in Matungao, a lawless zone located outside the capital city. The plot focuses on the conflict between the rich and the poor rather than the drug war theme of the previous film.

== Cast and characters ==
- Anne Curtis as Nina Manigan: A vengeful former anti-narcotics operative.
- Gerald Anderson: A corporate outcast who allies with Manigan.
- Nour Hooshmand
- Monika Koudroglou Truong
- Sol Eugenio
- Lotlot de Leon
- Sarah Lahbati
- Eric Quizon
- Pauline Lopez
- Riki Benedicto

== Production ==
=== Development ===
Director Erik Matti considered expanding the story of BuyBust shortly after the film was released in 2018. In February 2023, reports confirmed that Matti was reuniting with Gerald Anderson for a project. Anderson shared a photo of the script, which revealed the working title BuyBust: The Undesirables. The script was written by Michiko Yamamoto. The first episode of the series is titled "Damsel in Distress".

On December 2, 2025, Netflix officially announced the project at the JAFF Creative Asia event in Yogyakarta, Indonesia. The announcement was made during a session with directors Erik Matti and Joko Anwar. Netflix confirmed that the story will be told as a nine-episode series.

=== Filming ===
In August 2023, Anne Curtis began training for the role. She attended a bootcamp with the 201st Infantry "Kabalikat" Brigade. Her preparation included marksmanship sessions. As of December 2025, principal photography for the series has commenced.

== Release ==
The series will release on Netflix in 2026 and will consist of 9 episodes.
