= Lotlot de Leon =

Filipino actress

- Born: Charlotte Jennifer Villamayor de Leon
- Occupation: Actress
- Years active: 1975–present
- Spouses: Ramon Christopher Gutierrez (m. 1989; ann. 2006) Fadi El Soury (m. 2018)
- Children: 4 (including Janine and Diego)
- Parents: Christopher de Leon (adoptive father); Nora Aunor (adoptive mother)
- Relatives: Matet de Leon (adoptive sister); Gil de León (adoptive grandfather); Lilia Dizon (adoptive grandmother)

Charlotte Jennifer "Lotlot" Villamayor de Leon-El Soury is a Filipino character actress.

== Career ==
She was a member of That's Entertainment, along with Ramon "Monching" Christopher as her love-team partner. The Lotlot-Monching was a popular love team in the late 1980s. They were paired in Bunsong Kerubin (1987), Love Boat: Mahal Trip Kita (1988), Love Letters (1988), Here Comes the Bride (1989), Mga Kuwento ng Pag-big (1989) and Hotdog (1990), among others.

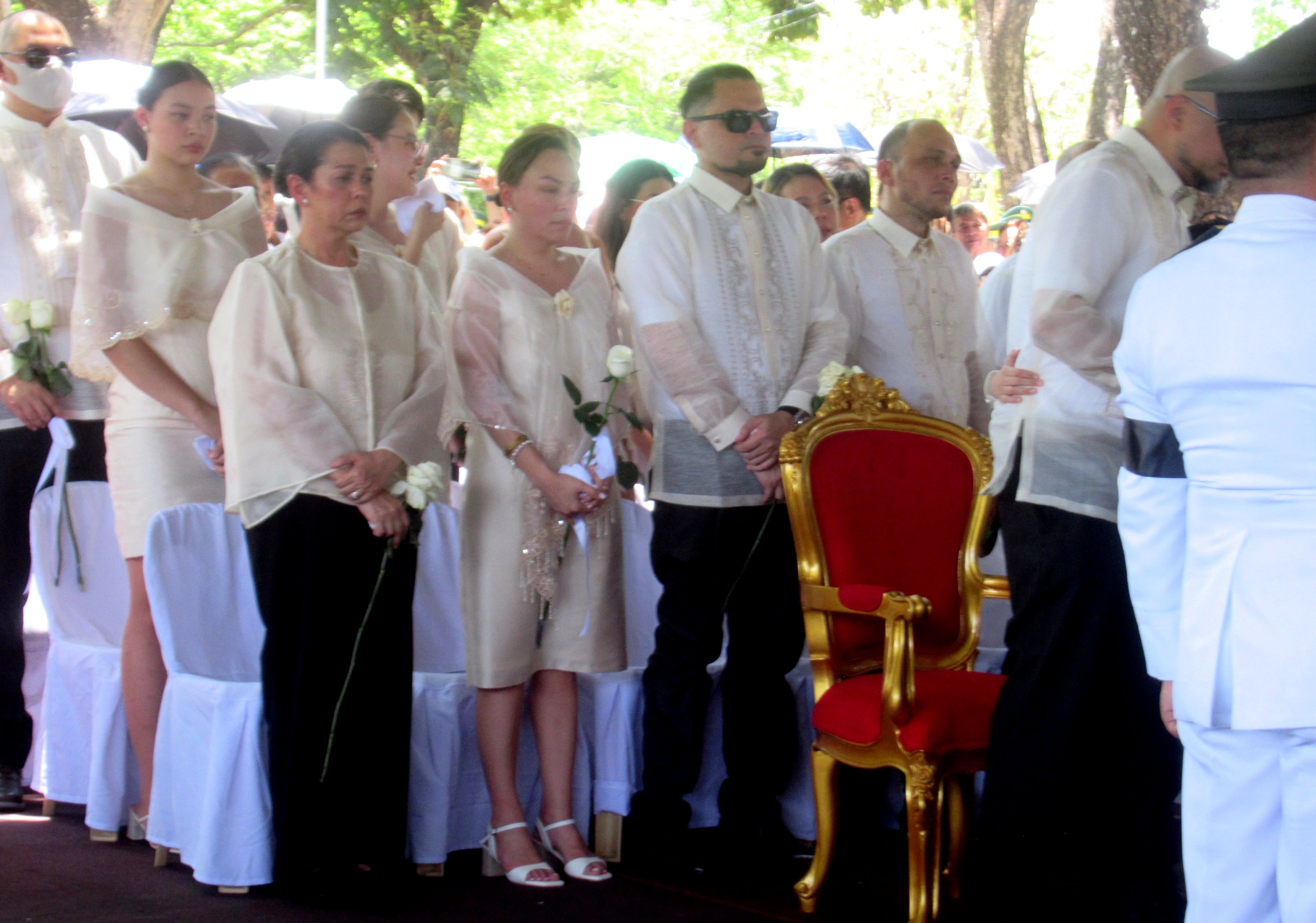
de Leon (center) at the Libingan ng mga Bayani during her adoptive mother's state funeral in 2025

== Personal life ==
Former US Navy serviceman Donald Olson and Eva Rodriguez are her biological parents. Nora Aunor and Christoper de Leon are her adoptive parents She is also the adoptive sister of actress Matet de Leon, actor Ian de Leon, Kenneth and Kiko.

She married former teen idol Ramon Christopher Gutierrez (son of Eddie Gutierrez) on March 27, 1989, until they separated in 2003. They have four children, including actors Janine Gutierrez and Diego Gutierrez.

On December 17, 2018, she married Lebanese national Fadi El Soury.

In June 2026, she acquired property in San Narciso, Quezon.

== Filmography ==
=== Film ===
- Nino Valiente (1975)
- Relaks Lang Mama, Sagot Kita (1976)
- Ibalik ang Swerte (1981)
- Hello, Young Lovers (1981)
- I Love You Mama, I Love You Papa (1986)
- Mahiwagang Singsing (1986)
- Balimbing (1986)
- Halimaw sa Banga (1986)
- Takot Ako, Eh! (1987)
- Bunsong Kerubin (1987)
- Prinsesang Gusgusin (1987)
- Tatlong Ina, Isang Anak (1987)
- Mga Anak ni Facifica Falayfay (1987)
- 1 + 1 = 12 (+ 1): One Plus One Equals Twelve (Cheaper by the Dozen) (1987)
- Fly Me to the Moon (1988)
- Love Boat: Mahal Trip Kita (1988)
- Sana Mahalin Mo Ako (1988)
- Nakausap Ko ang Birhen (1988)
- Wake Up Little Susie (1988) - Luglug de Leon
- Nasaan Ka Inay? (1988)
- Love Letters (1988)
- Sa Akin Pa Rin ang Bukas (1988)
- Sa Puso Ko Hahalik ang Mundo (1988)
- Tiyanak (1988)
- Mga Kuwento ng Pag-ibig (1989)
- Here Comes the Bride (1989)
- Kung Maibabalik Ko Lang (1989)
- Juan Tanga, Super Naman at an g Kambal Na Tiyanak (1990)
- Hotdog (1990)
- Shake, Rattle & Roll II (1990)
- Tatlong Maria (1991)
- Joey Boy Munti, 15 Anyos Ka sa Muntinlupa (1991)
- Ang Totoong Buhay ni Pacita M. (1991)
- Milan (2004)
- Feng Shui (2004) as Alice
- Tiyanaks (2007) as Aling Mildred
- I've Fallen for You (2007)
- Caregiver (2008)
- Way Back Home (2011)
- Kubot: The Aswang Chronicles (2014 GMA Films)
- Feng Shui 2 (2014)
- Dagsin (2016)
- Mang Kepweng Returns (2017 VIVA Films)
- Can't Help Falling in Love (2017) as Mama Two
- 1st Sem (2017)
- Miss Granny (2018 VIVA Films)
- Class of 2018 (2018 T-Rex Entertainment)
- Isa Pa with Feelings (2019 Black Sheep Productions)
- On the Job: The Missing 8 (2021 Reality Entertainment, Globe Studios) as Weng
- That Boy In The Dark (2023 BMW8 Entertainment Productions)
- Five Breakups and a Romance (2023)
- When I Met You In Tokyo (2023)
- Pula (2024)
- Uninvited (2024) as Norma
- Poon (2025)
- Sana Sinabi Mo (2025)
- A Special Memory (2026)
- Silenced Nights (2026)

=== Television ===
Year	Title	Role
1986–1996	That's Entertainment	Herself
1988	Lotlot & Friends	Herself
1990	Mag-Asawa'y Di Biro	Chari
1999	Wansapanataym: "Manika"	Gwen
2002–2003	Sa Dulo ng Walang Hanggan	Puresa
2004	Ikaw sa Puso Ko	Supporting Role
2004–2005	Spirits	Brita / Lupe
2005	Maalaala Mo Kaya: "Rosaryo"	Guest Star
2006	Sa Piling Mo	Norma
2006–2007	Carlo J. Caparas' Bakekang	Rita
2007	Princess Charming	Lizette De Leon
2007	Maalaala Mo Kaya: "Switcher"	Guest Star
2007	Maalaala Mo Kaya: "Rehas"	Violeta
2007	Maalaala Mo Kaya: "Dream House"	Nanette
2007–2008	La Vendetta	Rodora Alhambra
2008	Maalaala Mo Kaya: "Popcorn"	Gemma
2008	Mars Ravelo's Dyesebel	Banak
2008	Maalaala Mo Kaya: "Sopas"	Amy
2009	Maalaala Mo Kaya: "Lambat"	Guest Star
2009	Jim Fernandez's Kambal sa Uma	Lourdes Ocampo
2009	May Bukas Pa	Naty
2010	Maalaala Mo Kaya: "Basura"	Marilou
2010	Sine Novela: Gumapang Ka sa Lusak	Linda Mantaring
2010	Maalaala Mo Kaya: "Bimpo"	Guest Star
2010	Pilyang Kerubin	Maring Ignacio
2010	Maalaala Mo Kaya: "Videoke"	Nora
2010	Wansapanataym: "Inday sa Balitaw"	Monina
2010–2011	Koreana	Josefina Bartolome
2011	Maalaala Mo Kaya: "Cupcake"	Eden
2011	Nita Negrita	Mirasol "Mira" Buenaventura
2011	Rod Santiago's The Sisters	Soledad Santiago
2011–2012	Glamorosa	Miranda Evangelista
2012	Wansapanataym: "Water Willy"	Neday
2012–2013	Aryana	Rosita Salvador
2013	Juan Dela Cruz	Cora Galang
2014	Kambal Sirena	Susanna Villanueva
2014–2015	Hiram na Alaala	Annabelle Sta. Cruz
2015	My Mother's Secret	Cora Macapugay
2016	Juan Happy Love Story	Marissa "Isay" Canlas-Villanueva
2016	Conan, My Beautician	Perla
2017	Destined to be Yours	Amanda Rosales
2018	Inday Will Always Love You	D
2018–2019	Asawa Ko, Karibal Ko	Lupita Santiago
2020	Almost Paradise	Gloria Bautista
2020–2021	Walang Hanggang Paalam	Linda Delgado
2021–2022	Marry Me, Marry You	Judith Miraflor
2022	Love in 40 Days	Diana Perez
2023	The Write One	Teresita "Tess" Buenaventura-Herrera
2024	Makiling	Magnolia Torillo
2024	Lavender Fields	Rosita "Rose" Flores
2025	Sins of the Father	Lolita Trinidad
2025	Maalaala Mo Kaya: "Makeup"	
2026	BuyBust: The Undesirables	

== Awards and nominations ==
Year	Organization	Category	Nominated work	Result
2014	40th Metro Manila Film Festival	Best Supporting Actress	Kubot: The Aswang Chronicles 2	Won
2015	41st Metro Manila Film Festival	Best Supporting Actress	Buy Now, Die Later	Nominated
2016	All Lights India International Film Festival	Special Acting Citation Awardee	1st Sem	Won
2017	48th GMMSF Box-Office Entertainment Awards	Global Achievement by a Filipino Artist	1st Sem	Won
2022	45th Gawad Urian	Best Supporting Actress	On the Job: The Missing 8	Won
