= Tiktik: The Aswang Chronicles =

2012 film by Erik Matti

- Theatrical release poster
- Directed by: Erik Matti
- Written by: Erik Matti
- Story by: Erik Matti; Ronald 'Dondon' Monteverde
- Produced by: Jose Mari Abacan; Erik Matti; Trina Dantes-Quema
- Starring: Dingdong Dantes; Lovi Poe; Joey Marquez; Janice de Belen; Roi Vinzon
- Cinematography: Francis Ricardo Buhay III
- Edited by: Jay Halili
- Music by: Von de Guzman
- Production companies: Reality Entertainment; GMA Films; Mothership, Inc.; AgostoDos Pictures; PostManila
- Distributed by: GMA Films
- Release date: October 17, 2012
- Running time: 102 minutes
- Country: Philippines
- Languages: Filipino; English
- Budget: ₱80 million

Tiktik: The Aswang Chronicles is a 2012 Filipino action comedy horror adventure film written and directed by Erik Matti. The film stars Dingdong Dantes (who co-produced the film under AgostoDos Pictures), Lovi Poe, Joey Marquez, Janice de Belen and Roi Vinzon. The film is the first full-length Filipino film entirely shot on green screen chroma key. The film received mixed to positive reviews from critics who praised its visual effects while criticizing the plot. Tiktik: The Aswang Chronicles was followed up with a sequel Kubot: The Aswang Chronicles 2 in 2014, which was also directed by Matti.

== Plot ==
Makoy, an arrogant and ill-mannered playboy from Manila, travels to Pulupandan to reconcile with his pregnant girlfriend, Sonia. Sonia and her mother, Fely, reject him, but Sonia's father, Nestor, welcomes him and invites him to her birthday celebration. While shopping with the house helper, Bart, Makoy and Nestor meet Bart's cousin Ringo, whose son Kulot offers them a pig at a reduced price. They buy it from Hilda, Kulas and Mutya, unaware that it is a Tiktik, a variation of aswang.

That night, the pig attacks Sonia. Makoy and Nestor subdue it, and Makoy kills it, only for the creature to revert to Kulot. Bart recognises him as his nephew, prompting Makoy to suspect that Bart is also an aswang and restrain him. Ringo learns of Kulot's death and, revealing that he and his companions are Tiktiks, demands Makoy's unborn child in exchange for sparing Nestor's family. Makoy refuses, and the aswangs attack. He takes Bart hostage and drives towards a military checkpoint to seek help.

At the checkpoint, Ringo's group deceives the soldiers before ambushing and killing them. Makoy and Bart escape in a military vehicle, killing Kulas, and return to Nestor's house. The family protects the house with garlic and salt, which are believed to repel aswangs. Rex and his son Abel arrive to deliver supplies, but the Tiktiks attack, killing Rex while Makoy saves Abel. Hilda and Cedric enter through an unprotected window and attack the family. Makoy kills Hilda as Nestor kills Cedric, who has mortally wounded Fely.

An elder, Tatang, arrives with another group of aswangs and kills Ringo for allowing the deaths. He apologises to the humans but declares that they must all die to prevent the Tiktiks' existence from being discovered. He empowers the aswangs, making them resistant to garlic and salt. As the creatures overwhelm the house, Makoy convinces Nestor to help him get Sonia to safety and promises to take him to Manila. Calling Nestor "dad" finally convinces Sonia to accept his reconciliation. Bart, mortally wounded during their earlier escape, stays behind to delay the attackers, sacrificing himself with Molotov cocktails.

The survivors flee to Pacing's store, where she gives Makoy stingray-tail whips, believed to be more effective against aswangs, and helps Sonia deliver her baby, Mackie. Sonia, Pacing and Mackie hide at the nearby salt farm while Makoy, Nestor and Abel confront the Tiktiks. Tatang transforms into a winged aswang and abducts Mackie, but Sonia throws salt at him while Makoy strikes him with the whip, destroying him and allowing Sonia to recover the baby. Afterwards, the family follows Makoy's earlier plan to move to Manila.

== Cast ==
- Dingdong Dantes as Makoy
- Lovi Poe as Sonia
- Joey Marquez as Nestor
- Janice de Belen as Fely
- Roi Vinzon as Tatang
- LJ Reyes as Hilda
- Ramon Bautista as Bart
- Mike Gayoso as Ringo
- Rina Reyes as Pacing
- Roldan Aquino as Capt. Rainier Regalado
- Jan Harley Licana as Abel
- Dwight Gaston as Rex
- Cris Pastor as Mutya
- RJ Salvador as Kulot
- Jeff Fernandez as Kulas
- Montito Almario as Cedric

== Reception ==
=== Critical reception ===
Philbert Ortiz Dy of ClickTheCity.com rated the film 4.5 out of 5. He stated, "Tiktik: The Aswang Chronicles is a lot of fun. That may be the best way to describe it[...]The film goes to dark, violent places and asks people to laugh along. It is a genuinely unique vision that people really ought to see. The film does it all with tongue firmly in cheek, a streak of cultural satire running through the seemingly endless mayhem. And it still manages to tell a pretty decent story, with characters that feel distinctly familiar, living in a house environment that feels oddly true[...]Dingdong Dantes is really exceptional in roles that call for more of an edge. He excels at being standoffish, at having more confidence than a human should reasonably possess. The film makes great use of Dantes’ particular talents, and it makes for a very enjoyable performance".

Anton Umali of FHM Philippines also gave the film a favorable review. He stated, "If you’re expecting a conventional horror movie that will scare you by altering mood or copping out by taking the all-too-predictable gulat sequence, this isn’t it. Tiktik is fun and fresh, adapting more Grindhouse methods, like excessive violence, to boost the level of entertainment. And if you aren’t laughing your way out of the cinema, or touched by its awareness of the Pinoy penchant for emotion, you’ll probably be raging to maim, mutilate, and whip some aswang ass[...]it is an ultra-modern step in the right direction for local mainstream cinema." Neil Rara gave the film 9 out of 10 stating that, "...it’s one masterpiece worth a special place in the ranks of artistically-crafted Filipino films". He further stated, "The opening credits and title alone, which were entirely 3D animated, were worthy of praise[...]The cinematography of the movie is superb, typical of an Erik Matti film. Every scene seemed carefully shot and every shot seemed creatively composed. It was generally a well-crafted movie with a good balance of form and substance. It may still not have reached the “Hollywood-level” its producers have wished to achieve, it nevertheless set the standards by which will be judged all future films that would attempt to go high-tech"

Rianne Hill Soriano of Business World praised the film, stating "TIKTIK: The Aswang Chronicles is uniquely Filipino in its vision and presentation. Aware of its strong and weak points, it works around its resources accordingly. Proclaiming that it is the first Filipino film to be completely shot on green screen, it mixes elements of action, comedy, and horror in order to juxtapose the old sensibilities of the aswang legend with contemporary style." Jennifer Dugena of Philippine Entertainment Portal also gave the film a positive review. She stated, "[Tiktik] looks like a made-for-the-big-screen comic book because of shots divided into multiple panels and exquisitely-composed scenes with colors and settings that seem drawn to achieve a ghoulish grittiness[...] film boasts of stunning visuals and graphic novel-inspired backgrounds that exude a sense of foreboding. Filipino viewers have never seen local special effects reach this level of maturity." She further stated, "The movie is technically excellent in form. The storyline is quite simple but it is relentlessly entertaining[...]it blends modern-day genres of entertainment to create a movie aiming to be at par with Hollywood standards".

A review from Pisara gave the film 3.5 out of 5. The review stated, "...good visuals do not automatically mean "great movie." While Tiktik is wonderful to look at, it still needs help with its storytelling. Several issues pervade the movie: weak characters and several scenes that go against logic". However, he also stated, "...several actors should be given praise. Main cast members Dingdong Dantes, Lovi Poe, Janice de Belen and Joey Marquez create a believable ensemble[...]It's not a perfect movie, but it's enjoyable and the visuals are appealing to look at".

=== Box office ===
The film was shown in 105 theaters in the Philippines. On its first day, the film grossed 10 million pesos. The film debuted at number 2 on the Philippine box office behind another Filipino film, This Guy's in Love with U Mare!, which was on its second week.

=== International Release ===
One of the lead stars, Dingdong Dantes, hinted in the TV show Party Pilipinas that the movie would indeed be screened internationally, although no confirmations was made by either the management of GMA Network or its distribution partner, Freestyle Releasing, or the stars themselves, as to where exactly it was scheduled to be screened, but hinted it would most likely be in film festivals initially prior to distribution in North America, the Middle East and the Asia-Pacific. But so far, nothing has been made.

=== Accolades ===
- 10th Golden Screen Awards
  - Best Visual/Special Effects winner: Dave Yu
- 29th PMPC Star Awards for Movies
  - Movie Sound Engineer of the Year Winner: Coreen de San Jose, Ditoy Aguila
  - Movie Supporting Actress of the Year winner: Janice de Belen

== Sequel ==
In early 2014, Erik Matti announced that Michiko Yamamoto will write the script for a second film. It will be titled Kubot: The Aswang Chronicles. On October 25, 2014, the teaser trailer was released. Dingdong Dantes and Joey Marquez are set to reprise their roles as Makoy and Nestor, respectively. The film stars a new cast ensemble, Isabelle Daza, Elizabeth Oropesa, Jeron Teng, KC Montero, and Abra. Ramon Bautista, who played Bart in the first film, will play a new character in the sequel. Kubot: The Aswang Chronicles is one of the official entries for the 2014 Metro Manila Film Festival.
