= Resureksyon =

- Directed by: Alfonso Torre III
- Screenplay by: Jimmy Flores; Mary Rose Colindres; Ruel Montañez; Dwight Gastron
- Story by: Richard Somes; Erik Matti; Ronald 'Dondon' Monteverde
- Produced by: Erik Matti
- Starring: Paulo Avelino; Jasmine Curtis-Smith; Isabelle Daza
- Cinematography: Neil Derrick Bion
- Edited by: Sheryll Lopez
- Music by: Francis de Vera
- Production companies: Regal Entertainment; Reality Entertainment
- Distributed by: Regal Entertainment
- Release date: September 23, 2015
- Running time: 80 minutes
- Country: Philippines
- Languages: Filipino; English

Resureksyon (lit. 'Resurrection') is a 2015 Filipino horror drama film directed by Alfonso Torre III and starring Paulo Avelino, Jasmine Curtis-Smith and Isabelle Daza. It was released on September 23, 2015, and produced by Regal Entertainment and Reality Entertainment.

== Plot ==
Ailah is a young woman who's left to fend for herself and her nephew after being orphaned at a young age; Mara is Ailah's older sister who's arrived home from working abroad inside a coffin only to be resurrected as a vicious vampire.

== Cast ==
- Paulo Avelino as Javier del Ocampo
- Jasmine Curtis-Smith as Ailah Libangan
- Isabelle Daza as Mara Alvarado
- John Lapus as Tito Baby
- Raikko Mateo as Miguel dela Peña
- Niño Muhlach as Mayor Diamante
- Alex Castro as Ramil
- Gee Canlas as Rita
- Franco Lagusad as Daryl Mendoza
- Juancho Trivino as Ethan Ocampo
- Prince Villanueva as Jared Alvarado

== See also ==
- List of Filipino films in 2015
