= On the Job =

2013 Filipino neo-noir crime thriller film

- Philippine theatrical release poster
- Directed by: Erik Matti
- Screenplay by: Michiko Yamamoto; Erik Matti
- Story by: Erik Matti
- Produced by: Charo Santos-Concio; Malou N. Santos; Ronald Monteverde; Leonardo T. Po
- Starring: Gerald Anderson; Joel Torre; Joey Marquez; Piolo Pascual; Shaina Magdayao; Empress Schuck; Leo Martinez; Michael de Mesa; Vivian Velez; Rayver Cruz; Angel Aquino
- Cinematography: Francis Ricardo Buhay III
- Edited by: Jay Halili
- Music by: Erwin Romulo
- Production companies: Star Cinema; Reality Entertainment
- Distributed by: Star Cinema
- Release dates: May 24, 2013 (Cannes Film Festival); August 28, 2013 (Philippines)
- Running time: 120 minutes
- Country: Philippines
- Language: Filipino
- Budget: ₱47 million
- Box office: ₱13.4 million

On the Job (abbreviated as OTJ) is a 2013 Philippine neo-noir and crime thriller film written and directed by Erik Matti, who co-wrote the screenplay with his wife Michiko Yamamoto. Starring Gerald Anderson, Joel Torre, Joey Marquez and Piolo Pascual, it tells the story of two hit-man prisoners (Anderson and Torre) who are temporarily freed to carry out political executions, and two law enforcers (Marquez and Pascual) tasked with investigating the drug-related murder case connected to the prison gun-for-hire business. The film co-stars Angel Aquino, Shaina Magdayao, Empress Schuck, Leo Martinez, Michael de Mesa, Vivian Velez, and Rayver Cruz.

The inspiration for On the Job came from a Viva Films crew member who said he had been temporarily released from prison to commit contract killings before he was reincarcerated. Star Cinema initially refused to produce the film in 2010, deeming it excessively violent compared with their usual rom-com projects; by 2012, however, they agreed to co-produce it with Matti's own film production company, Reality Entertainment. Filming took place in Manila and lasted 33 days, on a production budget of ₱47 million (about US$1.1 million).

On the Job was shown as part of the Directors' Fortnight at the 2013 Cannes Film Festival, where it was praised and received a standing ovation on May 24. The film was released in the Philippines on August 28, 2013, and in the United States and Canada on September 27 of that year. It received positive reviews from foreign and domestic critics. In 2021, the film and its sequel On the Job: The Missing 8 were re-edited as a six-part HBO Asia miniseries titled On the Job.

== Plot ==
In the Philippines, Mario and Daniel are prisoners who are frequently released and paid to commit contract killings. Mario spends his earnings on Tina, his daughter, and Lulette, his estranged wife, while Daniel sends remittances to his family and spends the rest on goods and privileges in prison. Daniel has come to see Mario as a mentor and father figure. After they murder drug lord Tiu and return to prison, Tiu's murder case is assigned to NBI Agent Francis Coronel through Congressman Manrique. When Coronel and his partner, Bernabe, arrive at the local precinct, they clash with PNP Sergeant Joaquin Acosta, who believes that the case was taken from him for political reasons.

Mario and Daniel carry out a hit on a woman named Linda, whose husband Pol seeks help from Acosta, his former colleague. Pol reveals that Tiu's murder is one of several assassinations ordered by Manrique's close friend Pacheco, a military officer campaigning for the Philippine Senate. Acosta agrees to protect Pol and heads to the station; along the way, he encounters Coronel and Bernabe. Meanwhile, Daniel shoots Pol, but his pistol jams before he can fire a fatal shot. The three officers converge on them, forcing Daniel and Mario to flee, although they manage to locate and kill Pol at a hospital. As they split up to escape, Bernabe is shot and Acosta catches a glimpse of Mario's face.

Coronel confronts Manrique and tells him that he intends to arrest Pacheco. Manrique warns Coronel that Pacheco's indictment will cause their downfall, as he considers Pacheco his last resort after having exhausted all his other options to remain affluent. Meanwhile, Acosta relays Mario's composite sketch to be broadcast on television before deciding to work with Coronel. When Coronel discovers Mario's identity, he visits Lulette and sees her flirting with Mario's friend, Boy. Coronel tells Acosta about his discovery, and Acosta uses it as leverage when he interrogates Mario. Although Acosta is unsuccessful, Mario later expresses to Daniel his feelings of betrayal. Mario then phones Tina, who tells her father that she saw his police sketch and that she intends to live independently.

Tiu's father tells Acosta and Coronel that he has evidence that they can use to arrest Pacheco. Coronel goes to visit Pacheco, who admits to killing Coronel's father to "save the country". Coronel then uses his cellphone to secretly record a conversation between Pacheco and his men about the murder of Tiu's father.

Soon after, Daniel kills Coronel in front of police headquarters, causing an enraged Acosta to attack Pacheco and Manrique's security detail. Meanwhile, a disheartened Mario realizes that he has no reason to leave prison since his family no longer wants anything to do with him, and stabs Daniel to death to remain incarcerated. Coronel's death prompts an investigation of Acosta, who is relieved of duty, and Pacheco, who tells journalists he is ready to be investigated. After attending Daniel's wake from afar, Mario goes home, kills Boy in front of his wife and daughter, and returns to prison.

Sometime later, a recovered Bernabe looks through Coronel's possessions and requisitions the phone Coronel used against Pacheco as evidence.

== Cast ==
- Gerald Anderson as Daniel
- Joel Torre as Mario Maghari
- Joey Marquez as Joaquin Acosta
- Piolo Pascual as Francis Coronel Jr.
- Angel Aquino as Lulette
- Shaina Magdayao as Nicky
- Empress Schuck as Tina
- Leo Martinez as General Pacheco
- Michael de Mesa as Congressman Manrique
- Vivian Velez as Thelma
- Rayver Cruz as Bernabe
- Lito Pimentel as Pol
- Mon Confiado as Boy

== Production ==
=== Development ===
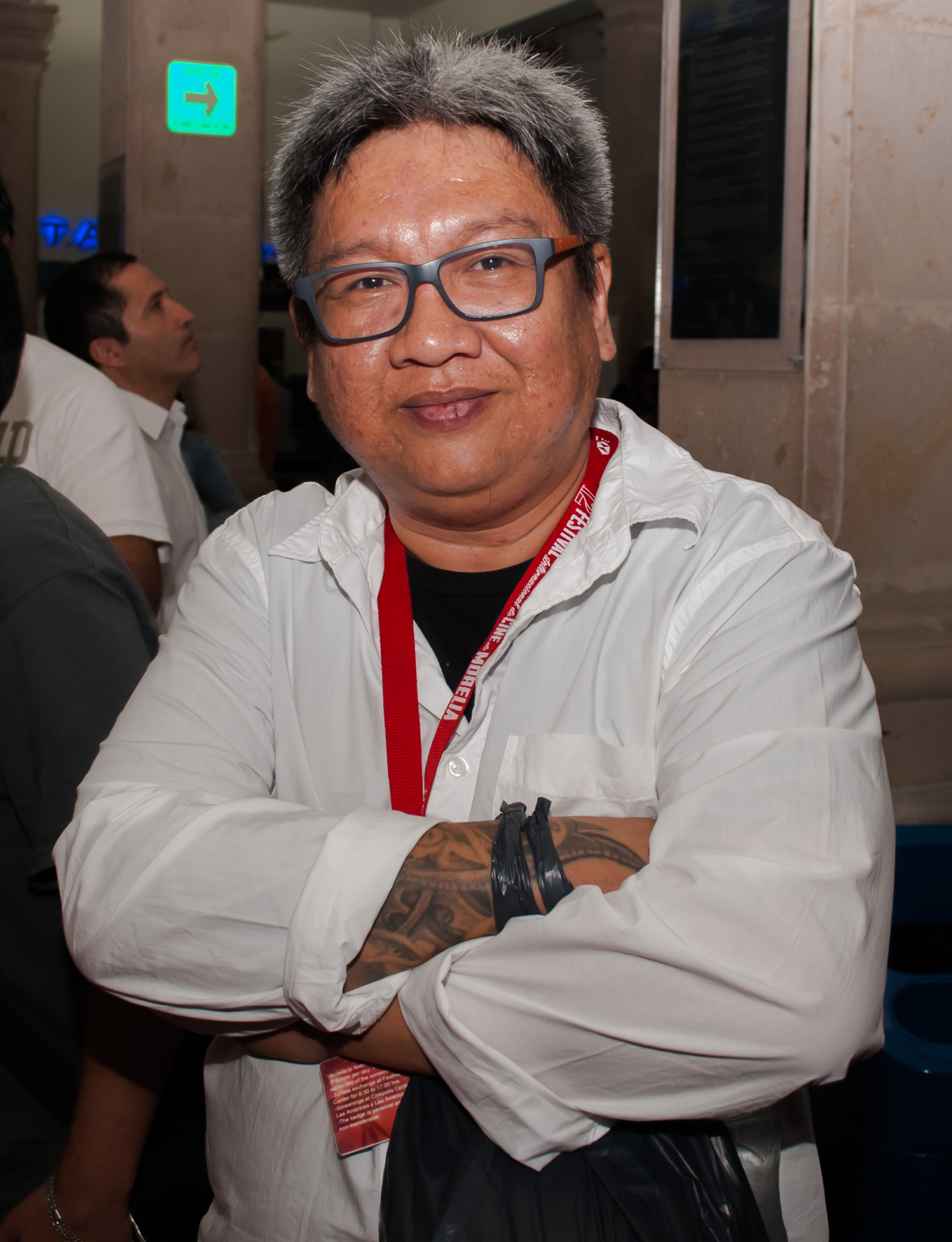
Director Erik Matti during the film's premiere at the 2014 Morelia International Film Festival

Director Erik Matti was inspired by a Viva Films service driver, an ex-convict who said that he used to be temporarily freed from prison to commit contract killings and reincarcerated. Matti shelved his idea until he ended his hiatus from directing with The Arrival, a short film he released to positive response at several film festivals in 2009. He opened the screenings with an eight-minute trailer for On the Job, with Joel Torre attempting to pitch the film. The trailer also had a favorable response, particularly from Twitch Film editor Todd Brown, who asked if the project had entered production. When Matti told him that the film did not yet have a screenplay, Brown encouraged him to write it while he looked for financing. During the script's ninth revision, screenwriter Michiko Yamamoto helped finalize the remainder of the draft. Four uncredited consultants were also hired to develop details of the story.

During the writing process and after the final draft was complete, Brown was unable to attract investors; some felt that the story was too nontraditional for Philippine cinema or too large a risk for the overseas market. Star Cinema (the Philippines' largest production company) refused to make the film in 2010, deeming it too violent compared with their usual romantic-comedy projects. Matti offered the project to two of Star Cinema's talents, who also declined due to the film's violence. The project was again put on hold as Matti entered the post-production stage of his horror fantasy film, Tiktik: The Aswang Chronicles (2012). He was then contacted by a Star Cinema agent, who requested the revised script; three days later, the studio agreed to fund the film.

Reality Entertainment, an independent film company co-founded by Matti, co-produced On the Job with Star Cinema. Reality Entertainment co-founder Dondon Monteverde, Lily Monteverde's son, said that many studios were impressed by the script but were reluctant to finance a big-budget action film. Although the production team considered cutting the film's budget, they decided against it in the hope of shifting away from low-budget films. Monteverde remembered arguing that it was "really time to do something big-budget and showcase it, rather than making something small and claiming budgetary restrictions. This time we didn't give ourselves any excuses. We went all the way". The film's production cost ₱47 million (about US$1.1 million in 2013). (Note: The exchange rate in 2013 was 42.446 Philippine pesos (₱) to one US dollar (US$), making ₱47 million worth about US$1.107 million.)

=== Pre-production and filming ===
Joel Torre, who plays Mario "Tatang" Maghari in the film, had already been cast before Matti's script revision. Torre said about the role, "[Mario] stuck with me, fought for me. And that gave me a lot of confidence, a Bushido Blade samurai." Matti asked Piolo Pascual to play attorney Francis Coronel Jr. The role of Daniel was originally written for John Lloyd Cruz, who was interested but had to decline due to scheduling conflicts; it went instead to Gerald Anderson. After a discussion between Pascual and Anderson about the film, Anderson signed for the role. He had only two weeks to film his scenes, since he was involved with a soap opera shoot at the time. The role of Sergeant Joaquin Acosta was to be played by Richard Gomez, but he decided to pursue a political career in Ormoc. Matti later cast Joey Marquez; although Marquez was seen primarily as a comedian, the director believed that he could play a charming, obnoxious character.

Richard V. Somes was the film's production designer and action choreographer. To prepare for the prison scenes, the production crew built a set in an abandoned building in Marikina and hired 200 extras to play convicts. Principal photography took 33 days on location in a number of Manila areas, including City Hall, a Light Rail train station, and Caloocan. The opening scenes were shot during the annual Basaan Festival in San Juan. Filming was done in over 70 locations, and the crew sometimes shot in several areas on a given day. On choosing Manila as the film's key location, Matti said:

This is a Manila movie. We wanted to show as much of the cross section of Manila as we could. This is, I think, the most ambitious attempt at putting together as much variety [in a local film] in terms of look and feel.

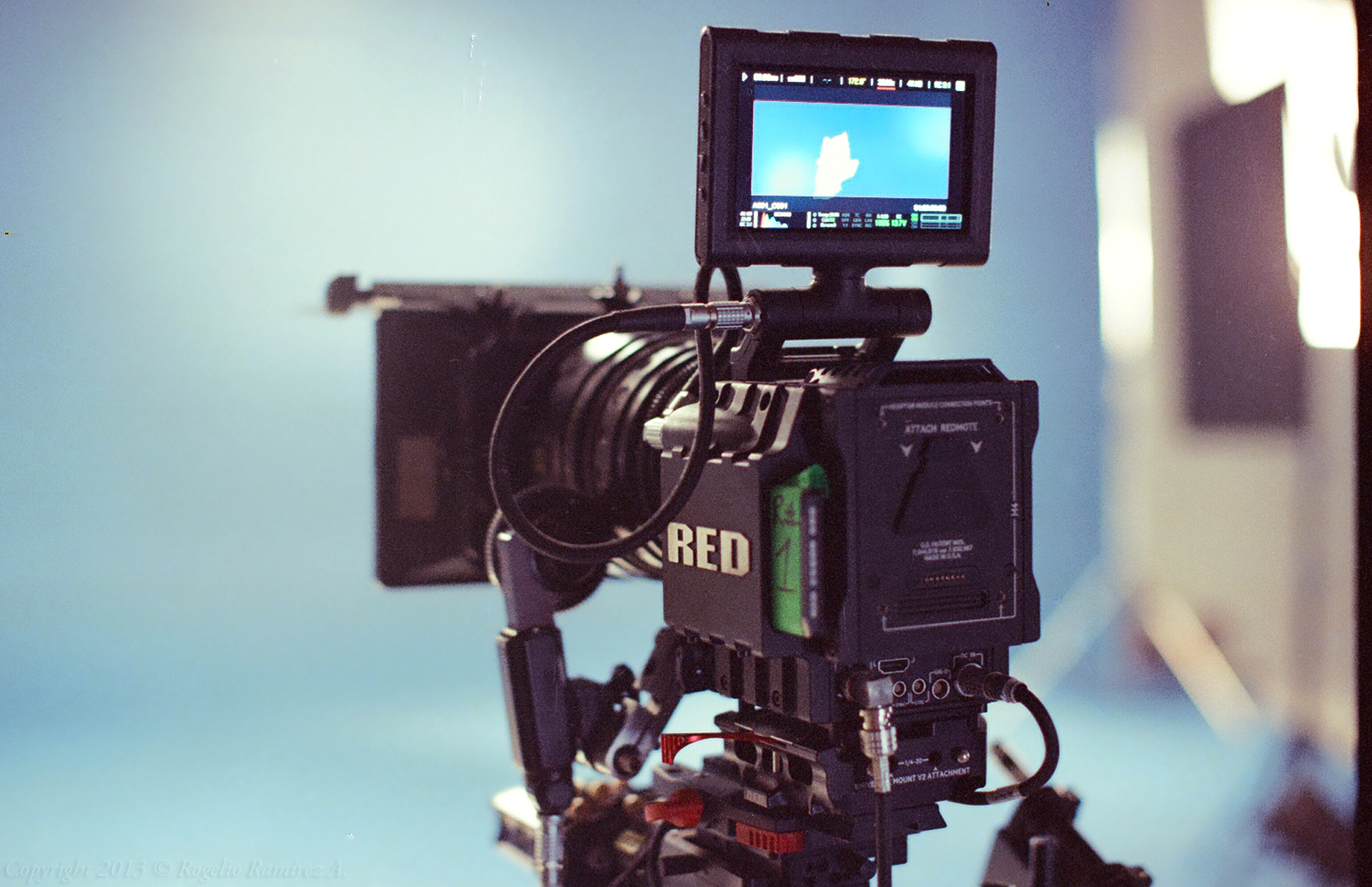
On the Job was filmed with the Red EPIC camera.

Francis Ricardo Buhay III, who had also worked on Matti's Tiktik and Rigodon (2013), was the film's cinematographer. Rather than setting up and changing lights for certain shots, Buhay filmed with the Red EPIC camera; with the Red EPIC's available-lighting function (including the ability to light an entire set), the film had a modern noir style without appearing low-budget.

=== Music ===
Erwin Romulo, editor-in-chief of the Philippine edition of Esquire until 2013, was On the Job's musical director. At their first meeting, Matti hired Romulo as the music supervisor; Romulo's role changed, however, since he wanted to produce most of the tracks he had planned for the film. Romulo used lesser-known original Pilipino music tracks from otherwise-prominent Filipino musicians, such as "Maskara" and "Pinoy Blues" by the Juan de la Cruz Band. He approached Dong Abay and Radioactive Sago Project bassist Francis de Veyra to perform the songs, which were arranged by Armi Millare. Additional tracks were performed by Ely Buendia, the late FrancisM, and local band Bent Lynchpin. Bent Lynchpin member Fred Sandoval was also the film's music editor.

Romulo cited works by Lalo Schifrin and director Ishmael Bernal's longtime composer, Vanishing Tribe, as influences on the soundtrack. He also considered DJ Shadow's album Endtroducing..... a significant influence, "albeit unconsciously".

== Release ==
=== Theatrical run and distribution ===
On the Job had its world premiere in the Directors' Fortnight section of the 2013 Cannes Film Festival on May 24. Although it did not win the Caméra d'Or prize, it received a two-minute standing ovation from the audience. The film had its Philippine release on August 28, 2013, and grossed ₱13,459,037 at the box office in three weeks.

It was released in North America by Well Go USA Entertainment on September 27, 2013. Well Go USA had bought the North American rights for the film before its premiere at Cannes, and also acquired its DVD, Blu-ray, and video on demand distribution rights. The agreement was made by Well Go USA president Doris Pfardrescher and XYZ Films founders Nate Bolotin and Aram Tertzakian. On the Job played at 29 North American theaters in three weeks, grossing $164,620. It was released in France by Wild Side Films, and in Australia by Madman Entertainment. The deals with the French and North American distribution companies secured $350,000 (₱12 million). The film was also made available on the North American market through Netflix by Well Go USA.

=== Home media ===
It was released on DVD and Blu-ray by Well Go USA on February 18, 2014. Special features include making-of footage and deleted scenes. Justin Remer of DVD Talk praised the Blu-ray's video and audio transfers, generally criticizing its special features. Kevin Yeoman of High-Def Digest and Jeffrey Kauffman of Blu-ray.com rated the release 3.5 out of 5, and agreed about the transfers and special features. On the Job amassed $167,128 in North American video sales.

== Reception ==
=== Critical response ===
On the Job received generally positive reviews from critics. Several critics praised the cast, with their performances called "well-acted" and "top-notch". Mikhail Lecaros praised the lead actors' "parallel depiction of the relationship between fathers and sons" in GMA News; according to Philippine Entertainment Portal's Mari-An Santos, they "provide the heart of the story". In Variety, Justin Chang praised Torre's departure from his usual "good-guy persona with a superbly menacing but very human performance". Santos said that Pascual "holds his own, but with a consistently excellent ensemble, his acting pales in comparison"; according to Lecaros, he "acquits himself well as a law enforcer whose crises of faith would be right at home in a Johnnie To (Election, Breaking News) or Michael Mann (Collateral, Miami Vice) film." Although Santos praised the female roles, Film Business Asia's Derek Elley called them "minimal and not especially memorable"; a Complex magazine reviewer called them "essentially talking props, which lessens the impact of developments".

Critics praised the film as engaging and well-made but considered its plot convoluted. Neil Young, in The Hollywood Reporter, found Matti and Yamamoto's script conventional and "many of the dialogue scenes operat[ing] on a functionally prosaic level". Lecaros and Santos praised the script, which Lecaros said "puts traditional notions of right, wrong, family, and loyalty through the wringer—and then some!" Although the police procedural subplot was described as "particularly colorful" by IndieWire, The A.V. Club's Ignatiy Vishnevetsky called it dull and "occasionally heavy-handed". Young said that Matti's "muscular handling of fast-paced action sequences consistently impresses", and The New York Times' Jeannette Catsoulis wrote that his "pitiless view of Filipino society may be deadening, but his filming is wondrously alive". Catsoulis made On the Job her "critic's pick", and Rappler's Carljoe Javier said it "serves as a shot of adrenaline, not only to the hearts of [Filipino] viewers, but hopefully also to mainstream [Philippine] cinema".

On the review aggregator website Rotten Tomatoes, 94% of 18 critics' reviews are positive, with an average rating of 6.7/10. On Metacritic it received "Generally favorable reviews", with an overall weighted average of 70 out of 100, based on 11 critics. In the Philippines, members of the Cinema Evaluation Board gave the film an "A" grade.

=== Accolades ===
In addition to being featured at the Cannes Film Festival, On the Job was screened at the 17th Puchon International Fantastic Film Festival in Bucheon, South Korea. Joel Torre won the Best Actor award, and the film received the Jury Prize. At the 62nd FAMAS Awards, the film won six of its twelve nominations: Best Picture, Best Director (Matti), Best Screenplay (Matti and Michiko Yamamoto), Best Editing (Jay Halili), Best Story (Matti), and Best Sound (Corinne de San Jose). Piolo Pascual also received the Fernando Poe Jr. Memorial Award for Excellence for his performance. The film received eight nominations at the 37th Gawad Urian Awards, winning two: Best Actor (Torre) and Best Sound (de San Jose).

== Sequel, miniseries, planned remake and prequel ==
=== On the Job: The Missing 8 ===
On The Job's sequel On the Job: The Missing 8 was screened in competition at the 78th Venice International Film Festival on September 10, 2021.

=== Miniseries ===
On the Job is a six-part Philippine miniseries created and developed by Erik Matti for HBO Asia Originals. It was adapted from the two On the Job films: the 2013 film and its sequel The Missing 8, both of which are directed by Matti. The first two episodes of the miniseries are a re-edited and remastered version of the first film.

=== Planned remake ===
An American version of the film was confirmed in June 2013, which would be directed by Icelandic filmmaker Baltasar Kormákur and produced by Kormákur's Blueeyes Productions. XYZ Films, the production and sales company holding the international rights, will co-produce the film and release it worldwide.

=== On the Job: Maghari ===
A prequel titled On the Job: Maghari will premiere in 2026.
