= On the Job: The Missing 8 =

2021 Philippine crime thriller film

- Promotional poster
- Directed by: Erik Matti
- Written by: Michiko Yamamoto
- Based on: Characters by Erik Matti; Michiko Yamamoto
- Produced by: Erik Matti
- Starring: John Arcilla; Dennis Trillo; Dante Rivero; Lotlot de Leon; Christopher de Leon; Leo Martinez; Joey Marquez; Eric Fructuoso; Vandolph Quizon; Agot Isidro; Sol Cruz; Wendell Ramos; Lao Rodriguez; Andrea Brillantes; Isabelle de Leon; Ina Feleo; Megan Young; Levi Ignacio; Carlos Siguion-Rivera
- Cinematography: Neil Derrick Bion
- Edited by: Jay Halili
- Music by: Erwin Romulo; Malek Lopez; Arvin Nogueras
- Production companies: Reality MM Studios; Globe Studios
- Distributed by: HBO Asia Originals; Warner Bros. Pictures
- Release dates: September 10, 2021 (Venice); February 18, 2022 (Philippines)
- Running time: 208 minutes
- Country: Philippines
- Language: Filipino

On the Job: The Missing 8 (also known as On the Job 2) is a 2021 Philippine crime thriller film directed by Erik Matti and written by Michiko Yamamoto. The sequel to the 2013 film On the Job, it tells the story of a journalist who investigates the mysterious disappearance of his colleagues, and a prisoner who is temporarily freed to carry out assassinations. The film stars an ensemble cast that consists of John Arcilla, Dennis Trillo, Dante Rivero, Lotlot de Leon, Christopher de Leon, Leo Martinez, Joey Marquez, Eric Fructuoso, Vandolph Quizon, Agot Isidro, Sol Cruz, Wendell Ramos, Lao Rodriguez, Andrea Brillantes, Isabelle de Leon, Ina Feleo, Megan Young, Levi Ignacio, and Carlos Siguion-Rivera.

The film premiered on September 10, 2021 at the 78th Venice International Film Festival, where it entered the Main Competition for the Golden Lion and won the Volpi Cup for Best Actor for John Arcilla. The film was later selected as the Philippine entry for the Best International Feature Film at the 95th Academy Awards.

It was also adapted into a miniseries for HBO Asia called On the Job, with the re-edited version of the first film serving as the first two episodes, which was nominated at the 50th International Emmy Awards for Best TV Movie or Miniseries.

== Plot summary ==
Sisoy Salas (John Arcilla), a corrupt reporter for a local newspaper, is forced to start an investigation following the disappearance of his colleagues and pits him against his personal interests. Meanwhile, Roman Rubio (Dennis Trillo), an inmate who is routinely released from prison to carry out assassinations, is sentenced to life in prison for a crime he did not commit and, not wanting to spend the rest of his life as a hitman, begins to plan ways to regain his freedom by any means necessary.

== Cast ==
- John Arcilla as Sisoy Salas
- Dennis Trillo as Roman Rubio
- Dante Rivero as Mayor Pedring Eusebio
- Christopher de Leon as Arnel Pangan
- Lotlot de Leon as Weng
- Leo Martinez as Gen. Pacheco
- Agot Isidro as Senator Alice Samson
- Andrea Brillantes as Diane Salas
- Soliman Cruz as Obet
- Rayver Cruz as Bernabe
- Joey Marquez as Sgt. Joaquin Acosta

== Production ==
Director Erik Matti had originally intended the On the Job sequel to be a web series, until it was reported in 2018 that he was making it a feature-length sequel instead. With On the Job 2, Matti wanted to tackle corruption in the Philippine media and deliver a social commentary on the current state of the Philippine government. According to Matti, the film will pick up where the original left off and will feature four interwoven storylines in "a three-hour and 28-minute movie". Erwin Romulo, reprising his role from the first film as musical director, has said On the Job 2 is Matti's "angriest work". Matti agreed, having told NME in a February 2021 interview:

I think for On The Job, I guess… yes, it's the angriest I've been. But what I do mostly in my films is to explore. I'm interested in processes: how does a newspaper get its news? How does one build a church in the guise of getting money from its parishioners? Those are things that matter to me. There's a lot of research that went into it. Of course, we found out that in small towns mainly you have politicians taking care of newspapers and radio stations, and that's where the problems with self-interest come in.

Dennis Trillo, Lotlot de Leon, Ricky Davao, William Martinez, John Arcilla, Dante Rivero, Vandolph Quizon, and Eric Fructuoso were reported to have joined the cast in 2018. In 2019, Rayver Cruz, Christopher de Leon, Soliman Cruz. Ina Feleo, Isabelle de Leon, and Andrea Brillantes were announced as co-stars. Filming began that same year, and was completed in August 2020 during the COVID-19 pandemic. Post-production was completed in June 2021, lasting for "around seven months".

== Release ==
The film was screened for the main competition at the 78th Venice International Film Festival, with Matti and Trillo in attendance. It received a 5-minute standing ovation during the premiere. During the awards ceremony, John Arcilla became the first Southeast Asian and Filipino to win the Volpi Cup for Best Actor in the festival's history, with Matti accepting the award on his behalf and Arcilla giving his acceptance speech via online video call after not being able to attend the ceremony due to filming commitments. It was also screened in 'Harbour' section at the 51st International Film Festival Rotterdam held from January 26 to February 6, 2022.

On the Job: The Missing 8 had its Philippine premiere on February 18, 2022 at the Cultural Center of the Philippines as part of the "WAGI!" film screenings, an event celebrating Filipino film excellence.

=== Miniseries and sequel ===
A six-part miniseries were created and developed by Erik Matti for HBO Asia. It was adapted from the two On the Job films— the 2013 film, and its sequel The Missing 8. The first two episodes of the miniseries are a re-edited and remastered version of the first film.

Matti revealed that a second sequel is in the works, which will feature "characters from the first two [instalments]" and "might be the end of the franchise".

== Reception ==
=== Critical response ===
Both the film and miniseries have received largely positive reviews from critics. Writing for Variety, Jessica Kiang called the film "a sprawling, satisfying big-screen binge." Keith Uhlich, of The Hollywood Reporter, praised the film's set pieces but criticized some of the film's stylistic choices. In a review of the HBO miniseries, Marcus Goh of Yahoo News praised the dramatic elements of the series and its handling of characters, concluding that "the Philippines can be a strong contender for Asian crime thrillers, rivalling that of more established places like Hong Kong."

=== Awards and nominations ===
| Award | Date of ceremony | Category | Recipient | Result | Ref. |
|---|---|---|---|---|---|
| Venice Film Festival | September 11, 2022 | Golden Lion | Erik Matti | Nominated | |
| Venice Film Festival | September 11, 2022 | Volpi Cup for Best Actor | John Arcilla | Won | |
| 45th Gawad Urian Awards | November 17, 2022 | Best Film | Erik Matti | Won | |
| 45th Gawad Urian Awards | November 17, 2022 | Best Direction | Erik Matti | Won | |
| 45th Gawad Urian Awards | November 17, 2022 | Best Actor | Dennis Trillo | Nominated | |
| 45th Gawad Urian Awards | November 17, 2022 | Best Actor | John Arcilla | Won | |
| 45th Gawad Urian Awards | November 17, 2022 | Best Supporting Actress | Lotlot de Leon | Won | |
| 45th Gawad Urian Awards | November 17, 2022 | Best Supporting Actor | Dante Rivero | Won | |
| 45th Gawad Urian Awards | November 17, 2022 | Best Screenplay | Michiko Yamamoto | Won | |
| 45th Gawad Urian Awards | November 17, 2022 | Best Cinematography | Neil Bion | Nominated | |
| 45th Gawad Urian Awards | November 17, 2022 | Best Editing | Jay Halili | Won | |
| 45th Gawad Urian Awards | November 17, 2022 | Best Production Design | Roma Regala Michael Español | Nominated | |
| 45th Gawad Urian Awards | November 17, 2022 | Best Music | Erwin Romulo Malek Lopez Arvin Nogueras | Won | |
| 45th Gawad Urian Awards | November 17, 2022 | Best Sound | Corinne De San Jose | Won | |
| 50th International Emmy Awards | November 21, 2022 | Best TV Movie or Miniseries | Erik Matti | Nominated | |

== See also ==
- List of submissions to the 95th Academy Awards for Best International Feature Film
- List of Philippine submissions for the Academy Award for Best International Feature Film
