= 1st Sem =

- Theatrical film poster
- Directed by: Dexter Hemedez; Allan Ibanez
- Written by: Dexter Hemedez; Allan Ibanez
- Produced by: Dexter Hemedez; Allan Ibanez; Gary Paglinawan
- Starring: Lotlot de Leon; Darwin Yu; Miguel Bagtas; Allan Paule
- Cinematography: Neil Daza
- Edited by: Alec Figuracion
- Music by: Ernie Magtuto
- Production company: Team Campry Entertainment
- Release dates: March 16, 2016 (Cinefilipino Film Festival); April 26, 2017
- Running time: 90 minutes
- Country: Philippines
- Languages: Filipino; English

1st Sem is a 2016 Filipino independent coming of age comedy-drama film directed and written by Dexter Hemedez and Allan Ibanez in their feature-film directorial debut. The film stars Lotlot de Leon and newcomer Darwin Yu. It is an official entry to the 2nd CineFilipino Film Festival.

The film's teaser trailer was released at YouTube on January 20, 2016.The film will be having its commercial release on April 26, 2017.

== Plot ==
Maru Marasigan (Darwin Yu), a sixteen-year old incoming freshman from the province, leaves his hometown to study in one of the prestigious universities in Manila. He is accompanied by his mother Precy (Lotlot de Leon) as he goes to his dormitory.

But Precy cannot help but get emotional when she is about to leave him. Maru feels sad seeing his mother cry. This escalates after Maru spent his first night at the dorm feeling alone and very lonely. Maru then decides to pack his things and go back home. Precy is very shocked to see him in their kitchen early in the morning the following day.

Down on his knees, Maru pleads to Precy to allow him to study in a nearby college for he cannot afford to live miles away from his family. But Precy rejects Maru's request and tells him to go back to Manila instead. As Maru insists his decision and disobeys Precy, his relationship with his mother starts to fall apart.

== Cast ==
- Lotlot de Leon as Precy
- Darwin Yu as Maru
- Miguel Bagtas as Jairus
- Allan Paule
- Sebastian Vargas Jr.
- Karen Romualdez
- Teri Lacayanga
- Maddie Martinez
- Sachie Yu as Michelle

== Critical reception ==
Oggs Cruz from Rappler states in his review that "At first, 1st Sem seems like it is all about jokes and punch lines. As soon as all the noise and artifice die down, what's left is a tender coming-of-age tale that has its heart in the right place."

1st Sem won Best Debut Feature for directors Dexter Paglinawan Hemedez and Allan Michael Ibañez at the All Lights India International Film Festival. Lotlot de Leon, also won a special acting citation for her performance in the film.

1st Sem also won Gold Remi Award from the 50th Worldfest Houston International Film Festival. Lotlot de Leon also won Best Supporting Actress for the film.

The film also won awards in South Korea and Canada.

== Awards ==
Year	Organization	Category	Nominated work	Result
2016	CineFilipino Film Festival	Best Picture	Dexter Hemedez Allan Ibanez	Nominated
2016	All Lights India International Film Festival	Best Debut Director's Film	Dexter Hemedez Allan Ibanez	Won
2016	All Lights India International Film Festival	Special Acting Citation Awardee	Lotlot de Leon	Won
2017	50th Worldfest Houston International Film Festival	Gold Remi Award	Dexter Hemedez Allan Ibanez	Won
2017	50th Worldfest Houston International Film Festival	Best Supporting Actress	Lotlot de Leon	Won
2017	5th Seoul Guro Kids International Film Festival	Culture Exchange Award	Dexter Hemedez Allan Ibanez	Won
2017	14th San Diego Kids International Film Festival	Grand Jury Award, Best Feature	Dexter Hemedez Allan Ibanez	Won
2017	10th Angaelica Festival	Best International Feature	Dexter Hemedez Allan Ibanez	Won
2017	12th Buffalo Niagara Film Festival	Honorable Mention, Best Feature	Dexter Hemedez Allan Ibanez	Won
2017	13th Ellensburg Film Festival	Audience Choice Award	Dexter Hemedez Allan Ibanez	Won
2017	8th Indie Bravo! Film Awards	Honors for Film	Dexter Hemedez Allan Ibanez	Won
2018	10th Harvest of Honors (National Commission for Culture and the Arts)	Honors for Film	Dexter Hemedez Allan Ibanez	Won
2018	Film Ambassadors Award (Film Development Council of the Philippines)	Honors for Film	Dexter Hemedez Allan Ibanez	Won
