= Kuwaresma (film) =

2019 Filipino horror film

- Theatrical release poster
- Directed by: Erik Matti
- Screenplay by: Katski Flores
- Story by: Erik Matti; Katski Flores
- Produced by: Ronald 'Dondon' Monteverde; Erik Matti; Quark Henares; Joe Caliro
- Starring: Sharon Cuneta; John Arcilla; Kent Gonzales; Pam Gonzales; Guila Alvarez
- Cinematography: Neil Derrick Bion
- Edited by: Jay Halili
- Music by: Erwin Romulo; Malek Lopez
- Production companies: Reality Entertainment; Globe Studios
- Distributed by: Reality Entertainment
- Release date: May 15, 2019
- Running time: 113 minutes
- Country: Philippines
- Language: Filipino

Kuwaresma (transl. Lent), also known as The Entity, is a 2019 Filipino supernatural horror film directed by Erik Matti and starring Sharon Cuneta and John Arcilla, with Kent Gonzales, Pam Gonzales and Guila Alvarez in supporting roles.

== Synopsis ==
The story follows Luis Fajardo (Kent Gonzales), who returns to his home in Baguio to mourn the death of his twin sister. He is welcomed by his parents—Rebecca (Sharon Cuneta) and Arturo (John Arcilla)—in their family, but they remain silent on the truth about the death of his sister.

== Cast ==
- Sharon Cuneta as Dr. Rebecca Fajardo: A doctor and the passive matriarch of the Fajardo family. Cuneta, the first and only choice for the female lead, accepted the role 15 minutes after Matti offered it to her. The film would reportedly "not have pushed through" had Cuneta refused to star in it. She was offered the role in December 2018 after working on a commercial for Selecta in Makati. Cuneta shot her scenes for 25 days, and lost weight as a result. Matti characterized Cuneta's character as an unkempt woman.
- John Arcilla as Arturo Farjardo: The strict patriarch of the Fajardo family who harbors a secret. There was apprehension as to Arcilla's casting as he was occupied shooting the television series Ang Probinsyano. However, Arcilla accepted the role after Matti offered it to him, and Arcilla traveled back and forth, from Manila to Baguio, to film his scenes. Kuwaresma marked the first time Arcilla and Cuneta had worked together in a film; they previously appeared in a TV commercial.
- Kent Gonzalez as Luis Fajardo: A teenager who returns home to attend the wake of his sister, who died under mysterious circumstances. For the role of Luis, Matti sought actors between the age range of 15 to 18 years old, and someone who has "the sensitivity and the vulnerability that the character has". Matti saw these qualities on Gonzales, whom Matti also found physically fit for the role. Matti added that Gonzales was able to portray Luis' emotional and psychological struggles in the story. Gonzales had auditioned twice and watched Matti's previous horror films in preparation for the role. To shoot the difficult scenes, he had to learn from his more experienced co-stars, doing tension exercises with Cuneta and studying Arcilla's acting technique through his eye and voice projections.
- Pam Gonzales as Manuela Fajardo: Luis' fraternal twin sister who died under mysterious circumstances. For the role of Manuela, Matti looked for girls who would pass off as Luis' twin. The production team looked for someone who looks similar to Gonzales without asking him if he had a sister. On the day Matti was to screen test the actresses, Gonzales revealed that he had a sister. Kent's sister, Pam, was given the role of Manuela after Matti found her looks identical to that of her brother.
- Guila Alvarez as Salve: A psychic/medium who warns Luis in the beginning of the film. For the role of Salve, Matti looked for a "wild card" as opposed to casting someone who is "sort of over-exposed" in film and television to make the cast interesting. Matti offered Alvarez the role, though he was uncertain whether she would accept it since it has been around 20 years since Alvarez last acted, with Ang TV being her most notable acting credit.

== Production ==
Kuwaresma was produced under Reality Entertainment and Globe Studios, and was directed by Erik Matti. Matti and Dondon Monteverde of Reality Entertainment initially planned to create Kuwaresma in a smaller scale. Matti began work on the film in October 2018, after he left Darna and experienced casting issues on the sequel film On the Job 2. Originally meant to be a "quick film", more serious work on Kuwaresma was done after Sharon Cuneta and John Arcilla was cast as the main characters of the film and both were given five-page scripts. Filming began in December 2018 in Baguio. Matti selected Baguio as the primary location due to its good food and weather, which he found conducive to filming.

The film is set in 1985 in Baguio. For the house of the Fajardo family, a "beautiful" building which is also "scarred, elegant yet mysterious, welcoming yet somber, perfect yet slightly off", was used. After Cuneta came on board, Matti and Monteverde began scouting more locations in Baguio for four days, during which time they located a house devoid of any furniture nearby The Mansion. They also used another Baguio house which the owner of the Fajardo residence also owns.

The production crew comprised 150 people, who resided in the city for a month and a half. The film's art department worked on painting and clothing for scenes set in different time periods: 1944, 1955, 1965, 1977, and 1985. The script required most of the film to be set at night. The climax, which involves a confrontation between Cuneta and Arcilla's characters, took two days to film.

Visual effects were also heavily used in Kuwaresma, including the demon that appears in the film. The demon was portrayed by a man in a basic silicone and latex demon suit enhanced digitally through the addition of textures on the suit and exaggerated horns and hair.

== Release ==
Kuwaresma was premiered with its director's cut version at SM Megamall on May 13, 2019. The film had its general release in the Philippines on May 15, 2019. Two versions of the film, which were rated R-13 and R-16 by the MTRCB, were released theatrically. The film began streaming on Netflix in select Asian countries in September 2019, under the title The Entity.

The film is also set to be screened in various film festivals outside the Philippines, including the Slash Festival des Fantastischen Films in Austria (from September 19 to 29, 2019), the ToHorror Film Festival in Italy (from October 8 to 17, 2019), Madrid International Fantastic Film Festival (from October 22 to 26, 2019) in Spain, the Tokyo International Film Festival (from October 29 to November 5, 2019) in Japan, the Oslo International Film Festival (from November 16 to 27, 2019) in Norway, and at the Buenos Aires Rojo Sangre (from November 28 to December 8, 2019) in Argentina.

== Critical reception ==
Julia Allende of Philippine Entertainment Portal criticized Kuwaresma for its over reliance on supernatural elements than on character motivations, its characters for being unoriginal, and its plot for being predictable. However, she praised its technical aspects such as the use of bluish-gray color scheme to establish the foreboding atmosphere of the film and the performance of Kent Gonzales who is relatively new in film acting compared to veterans Sharon Cuneta and John Arcilla. She also commended Arcilla's portrayal as an effective villain despite his character not being a well-rounded one. Allende also commented on a missed opportunity to make the film's title (which is Lent in Filipino) more relevant to the film's plot and suggested that the film could have looked into Baguio's folklore as inspiration for the film. Fred Hawson for ABS-CBN News also praised the film's technical aspects and Kent Gonzales's performance. However, Hawson found the plot increasingly convoluted as it progresses and its revelation as unnecessary.
