= Magnifico (film) =

2003 coming-of-age drama film by Maryo J. Delos Reyes

- Directed by: Maryo J. de los Reyes
- Written by: Michiko Yamamoto
- Produced by: Violeta C. Sevilla
- Starring: Jiro Manio; Lorna Tolentino; Albert Martinez; Gloria Romero
- Cinematography: Odyssey 'Odie' Flores
- Edited by: Manet A. Dayrit
- Music by: Lutgardo Labad
- Production company: Violett Film Productions
- Distributed by: Violett Film Productions
- Release date: January 29, 2003
- Running time: 123 minutes
- Country: Philippines
- Language: Filipino
- Budget: ₱20 million

Magnifico is a 2003 Philippine coming-of-age drama film directed by Maryo J. de los Reyes and written by Michiko Yamamoto. Starring Jiro Manio, Lorna Tolentino, Albert Martinez, and Gloria Romero, the story follows a titular child character who decides to design and build a coffin for his grandmother as well as raise funds to buy a wheelchair for his younger sister who has cerebral palsy.

Produced and distributed by Violett Film Productions, the film was theatrically released in the Philippines on January 29, 2003. Local and overseas critics generally praised its screenplay, emotional weight, and the cast's performances, and it received numerous accolades from award-giving organizations and international film festivals.

== Plot ==
In a small town in the province of Laguna, one special boy changes the lives of everyone he meets. Known to all as Magnifico, whose nickname is Ikoy, a child of an impoverished family. His father works odd jobs, his elder brother (Miong) has lost his academic scholarship, and his mother spends her days caring for both Helen, a young daughter who has cerebral palsy, and her husband's aging mother, who lives upstairs in the family home and has diabetes and pancreatic cancer. Magnifico is a sweet and well-intentioned boy who is often berated by his father for his stupidity, an unkind assessment for a child who is considerably more clever than anyone gives him credit for.

Magnifico's world includes several characters with personal challenges. These include a man mourning his mother; two conflicting shop owners; an elderly woman who runs the mortuary; his older brother, who is attracted to a woman from a higher socioeconomic background; his younger sister, who uses a wheelchair and wants to travel; and his ill grandmother, who is concerned about burial costs.

Nonetheless, Magnifico applies himself to the task, concocting a remedy for the mortician's ailments, playing matchmaker for his love-struck brother, scheming to provide a burial gown and coffin for his grandmother, and negotiating a wheelchair so he can take his invalid sister to the carnival. When the night of the carnival arrives, his efforts pay off.

Magnifico attempts to cross the street and instead gets fatally hit by a car one afternoon. Gerry, Edna, and Lola Magda mourn for their loss, and they rest him in the coffin he had originally crafted and intended for his grandmother. At his interment, Magnifico's family, friends, and the people he has touched are present as the community shares a tearful moment for his undying generosity.

== Cast ==
- Jiro Manio as Magnifico: The titular 8-year-old child protagonist
- Lorna Tolentino as Edna: The mother of Magnifico and his siblings
- Albert Martinez as Gerry: The father of Magnifico and his siblings
- Gloria Romero as Lola Magda: Magnifico and his siblings' grandmother, Edna's mother-in-law, and Gerry's mother
- Celia Rodriguez as Ka Doring: The mortician
- Mark Gil as Domeng: The man whose mother dies
- Tonton Gutierrez as Ka Romy: Gerry's boss and Isang's father
- Amy Austria as Tessie: Cristy's enemy and a sari-sari store owner
- Cherry Pie Picache as Cristy: A sari-sari store owner and Tessie's enemy
- Danilo Barrios as Miong: Magnifico's college-aged older brother
- Susan Africa as Pracing: Carlo's mother
- Isabella De Leon as Helen: Magnifico's younger sister who has cerebral palsy
- Dindin Llarena as Ria: One of Magnifico's friends
- Joseph Roble as Carlo: Magnifico's best friend
- Girlie Sevilla as Isang: Miong's girlfriend and Ka Romy's daughter
- John Romano as Ria's Father
- Dido De La Paz as Foreman
- Allyson VII Gonzales as Makoy: Miong's peer
- David Granado as Tessie's Husband
- Scarlet as Teacher
- Jojo Vinzon as the gay friend of Tessie
- Dan De Guzman II as the teacher of Magnifico

== Production ==
The screenplay, written by Michiko Yamamoto and which won first place in the scriptwriting contest, was inspired by her grandmother. Scenes from the film were shot in Pagsanjan, Laguna.

== Release ==
The film was first released in the Philippines on January 29, 2003, and received endorsement from the Department of Education. It was later given a release at the international film festivals including the Karlovy Vary International Film Festival in the Czech Republic on July 11, as one of its official entries; Fukuoka International Film Festival in Japan on September 13, under the Asian Panorama section; and Toronto International Film Festival in Canada on November 14.

== Reception ==
=== Accolades ===
Award-giving organization/Festival	Date	Category	Recipient	Result	Ref.
54th Berlin International Film Festival	February 5-15, 2004	Crystal Bear for Best Feature Film	Magnifico by Maryo J. de los Reyes	Won	
54th Berlin International Film Festival	February 5-15, 2004	Grand Prix of the Deutsches Kinderhilfswerk	Magnifico by Maryo J. de los Reyes	Won	
52nd FAMAS Awards	April 17, 2004	Best Picture	Magnifico	Won	
52nd FAMAS Awards	April 17, 2004	Best Actress	Lorna Tolentino	Nominated	
52nd FAMAS Awards	April 17, 2004	Best Supporting Actor	Mark Gil	Won	
52nd FAMAS Awards	April 17, 2004	Best Supporting Actress	Celia Rodriguez	Won	
52nd FAMAS Awards	April 17, 2004	Best Child Actor	Jiro Manio	Won	
52nd FAMAS Awards	April 17, 2004	Best Child Actress	Isabelle de Leon	Won	
52nd FAMAS Awards	April 17, 2004	Best Director	Maryo J. de los Reyes	Won	
52nd FAMAS Awards	April 17, 2004	Best Story	Magnifico; Story by Michiko Yamamoto	Won	
52nd FAMAS Awards	April 17, 2004	Best Theme Song	"Ang Aking Munting Bituin" by Gary Valenciano	Nominated	
27th Gawad Urian Awards	June 19, 2004	Best Film	Magnifico	Won	
27th Gawad Urian Awards	June 19, 2004	Best Director	Maryo J. de los Reyes	Won	
27th Gawad Urian Awards	June 19, 2004	Best Actor	Jiro Manio	Won	
27th Gawad Urian Awards	June 19, 2004	Best Supporting Actor	Albert Martinez	Won	
27th Gawad Urian Awards	June 19, 2004	Best Supporting Actor	Mark Gil	Nominated	
27th Gawad Urian Awards	June 19, 2004	Best Supporting Actress	Gloria Romero	Won	
27th Gawad Urian Awards	June 19, 2004	Best Supporting Actress	Isabelle de Leon	Nominated	
27th Gawad Urian Awards	June 19, 2004	Best Supporting Actress	Celia Rodriguez	Nominated	
27th Gawad Urian Awards	June 19, 2004	Best Supporting Actress	Girlie Sevilla	Nominated	
27th Gawad Urian Awards	June 19, 2004	Best Supporting Actress	Lorna Tolentino	Nominated	
27th Gawad Urian Awards	June 19, 2004	Best Screenplay	Magnifico; Screenplay by Michiko Yamamoto	Won	
27th Gawad Urian Awards	June 19, 2004	Best Cinematography	Odyssey Flores	Nominated	
27th Gawad Urian Awards	June 19, 2004	Best Editing	Manet A. Dayrit	Nominated	
27th Gawad Urian Awards	June 19, 2004	Best Production Design	Gerry Santos	Nominated	
27th Gawad Urian Awards	June 19, 2004	Best Sound	Arnold Reodica	Won	
22nd FAP Awards	July 3, 2004	Best Picture	Magnifico	Won	
22nd FAP Awards	July 3, 2004	Best Director	Maryo J. de los Reyes	Won	
22nd FAP Awards	July 3, 2004	Best Actor	Jiro Manio	Won	
22nd FAP Awards	July 3, 2004	Best Supporting Actor	Mark Gil	Nominated	
22nd FAP Awards	July 3, 2004	Best Supporting Actress	Gloria Romero	Won	
22nd FAP Awards	July 3, 2004	Best Screenplay	Magnifico; Screenplay by Michiko Yamamoto	Won	
22nd FAP Awards	July 3, 2004	Best Musical Score	Lutgardo Labad	Won	
22nd FAP Awards	July 3, 2004	Best Sound	Arnold Reodica	Nominated	
34th Gawad Urian Awards	May 17, 2011	Best Films of the Decade (2000–2009)	Magnifico by Maryo J. de los Reyes	Listed	

=== Critical response ===
On the review aggregator website Rotten Tomatoes, 63% of 8 critics' reviews are positive, with an average rating of 6.53/10. Metacritic, which uses a weighted average, assigned the film a score of 53 out of 100, based on 11 critics, indicating "mixed or average" reviews.

==== Domestic ====
Lito B. Zulueta, writing for the Philippine Daily Inquirer, described the film as a "first really good movie of 2003", with praise towards its screenplay, where screenwriter Michiko Yamamoto "expertly endows a contemporary and even positivistic flavor to the traditional miracle story" and Maryo J. Delos Reyes' serious direction from the original material. He also commended the cast's performances, including Jiro Manio, Gloria Romero, Albert Martinez, and Lorna Tolentino.

==== International ====
Time Out called the film an "undistinguished gentle comedy that turns into an astoundingly saccharin melodrama". Film critic Vincent Musetto, writing for the New York Post, praised the film for its "well-made" story as well as the acting performances of its lead actors, particularly child actor Jiro Manio. He also commended Delos Reyes' direction and Yamamoto's screenplay for evoking a range of emotions in the audience.

Ferdinand Lapuz, a foreign correspondent for Ricky Lo's entertainment column "Funfare", informed the columnist about the review of the film by film critic Norman Wilner for "Metro" in Toronto, Canada. Wilner's review said that "Magnifico is one of those films in which a decent soul struggles against enormous odds to bring some comfort to the people he loves. It's a melodrama, but it's honest about it".
