= Manny Many Prizes =

Philippine television game show

- Title card
- Genre: Game show
- Directed by: Louie Ignacio
- Presented by: Manny Pacquiao
- Theme music composer: Lito Camo
- Opening theme: "Manny Many Prizes" by MP Band
- Country of origin: Philippines
- Original language: Tagalog
- No. of episodes: 74

Production
- Executive producers: Lui Cadag; Ericka De Leon
- Camera setup: Multiple-camera setup
- Running time: 75 minutes
- Production company: GMA Entertainment TV

Original release
- Network: GMA Network
- Release: July 16, 2011 – December 2, 2012

Manny Many Prizes is a Philippine television game show broadcast by GMA Network. Directed by Louie Ignacio, it is hosted by Manny Pacquiao. It premiered on July 16, 2011. The show will give away prizes such as money, house and lot, cars, some even coming from Pacquiao himself. The show concluded on December 2, 2012, with a total of 74 episodes.

== Hosts ==
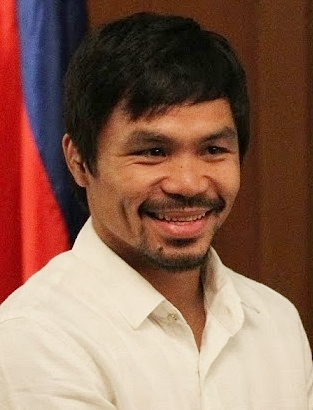
Manny Pacquiao served as the host.

- Manny Pacquiao

Co-hosts

- Rhian Ramos
- Isabelle Daza
- Gladys Guevarra
- Paolo Contis
- Benjie Paras
- Onyok Velasco
- Pekto
- John Feir
- Moymoy Palaboy
- Roadfill
- Via Antonio (since July 30, 2011)

Featuring

- SexBomb Girls
- Dang Palma

== Ratings ==
According to AGB Nielsen Philippines' Mega Manila household television ratings, the pilot episode of Manny Many Prizes earned a 16.3% rating. The final episode scored a 6.1% rating.

== Accolades ==
Accolades received by Manny Many Prizes
Year	Award	Category	Recipient	Result	Ref.
2012	26th PMPC Star Awards for Television	Best Reality/Game Show	Manny Many Prizes	Nominated	
2013	27th PMPC Star Awards for Television	Best Game Show	Manny Many Prizes	Nominated	
2013	27th PMPC Star Awards for Television	Best Game Show Host	Manny Pacquiao, Rhian Ramos, Isabelle Daza, Gladys Guevarra, Paolo Contis, Benjie Paras, Onyok Velasco, Mike "Pekto" Nacua, John Feir, Moymoy, Roadfill, Via Antonio	Nominated	
