= Munting Anghel =

2000 Philippine television drama series

- Title card
- Also known as: Little Angel
- Genre: Drama
- Created by: Dode Cruz
- Directed by: Louie Ignacio
- Starring: Isabella de Leon
- Theme music composer: Jun Lana; Louie Ignacio
- Opening theme: "Munting Anghel" by Antoinette Taus
- Country of origin: Philippines
- Original language: Tagalog
- No. of episodes: 13

Production
- Executive producer: Lilybeth G. Rasonable
- Camera setup: Multiple-camera setup
- Running time: 60 minutes
- Production company: GMA Entertainment TV

Original release
- Network: GMA Network
- Release: September 4 – November 27, 2000

Munting Anghel (trans. / international title: Little Angel) is a 2000 Philippine television drama series broadcast by GMA Network. The series is the fourth installment of GMA Mini-Series. Directed by Louie Ignacio, it stars Isabella de Leon in the title role. It premiered on September 4, 2000. The series concluded on November 27, 2000, with a total of 13 episodes.

== Cast and characters ==
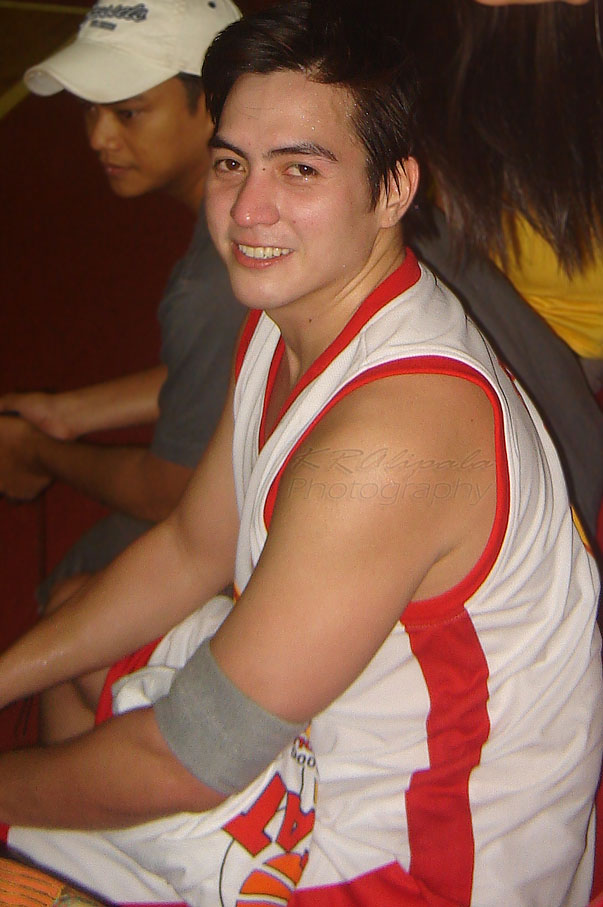
Wendell Ramos portrays Enrico.

Lead cast

- Isabella de Leon as Angelina

Supporting cast

- Antoinette Taus as Florence
- Wendell Ramos as Enrico
- Glydel Mercado as Monica
- Matthew Mendoza as Edward
- Daisy Reyes as Trinidad
- Gary Estrada as Jose
- Bing Loyzaga as Elvira
- Cheska Garcia as Abby
- Alicia Alonzo as Lily
- Eva Darren as Intiang
- Raymond Bagatsing as Rigor
- Ana Capri as Agnes
- Jackie Forster as Sylvia
- John Apacible as Arturo
- Kristal Moreno as Stefany
- Empress Schuck as Bubbles
