= Kubot: The Aswang Chronicles 2 =

2014 film by Erik Matti

- Theatrical release poster
- Directed by: Erik Matti
- Screenplay by: Michiko Yamamoto
- Story by: Erik Matti; Michiko Yamamoto
- Produced by: Jose Mari Abacan; Erik Matti; Trina Dantes-Quema
- Starring: Dingdong Dantes; Isabelle Daza; Joey Marquez; Lotlot de Leon; KC Montero; Elizabeth Oropesa
- Cinematography: Shing Fung Cheung
- Edited by: Vito Cajili; Sheryll Lopez
- Music by: Erwin Romulo; Malek Lopez
- Production companies: Reality Entertainment; Mothership, Inc.; AgostoDos Pictures; GMA Films; PostManila
- Distributed by: GMA Films
- Release date: December 25, 2014
- Running time: 105 minutes
- Country: Philippines
- Language: Filipino
- Budget: ₱86 million
- Box office: ₱120 million

Kubot: The Aswang Chronicles 2 is a 2014 Filipino science fiction action comedy horror adventure film co-written and directed by Erik Matti. The film stars Dingdong Dantes reprising his role as Makoy, and Joey Marquez as Nestor, along with new cast members Isabelle Daza, Lotlot de Leon, KC Montero and Elizabeth Oropesa. A sequel to the 2012 film Tiktik: The Aswang Chronicles, it is an official entry to the 40th Metro Manila Film Festival.

== Plot ==
After defeating the Tiktiks during the previous night in the town of Pulupandan, Makoy, his wife Sonia, their newborn son Mackie, Sonia's father Nestor and their neighbour Pacing leave the town. They are ambushed by the new aswangs, the Kubot, led by Veron. Veron kills Sonia and Pacing, takes Mackie and cuts off Makoy's hand. Makoy and Nestor survive the ensuing bus explosion.

Two years later, Makoy and Nestor work as mechanics in Manila, living with Makoy's older sister Nieves and her daughter. Makoy has a prosthetic arm built by engineering students Stacey and Benjie. Nieves works as a secretary for physician Lex, whom she suspects of illegal medical practices. After eavesdropping on Lex, Nieves discovers her torturing a patient. Lex is actually investigating reports of people turning into aswangs. That night, aswangs attack Lex's home, killing her family, and she escapes with Nieves.

At Nieves' house, Lex reveals that tainted processed meat from Dom's hotdogs is transforming people into aswangs. Makoy and Nestor initially refuse to help when they discover Lex is herself an aswang. Nieves and Lex return to Lex's home and are taken to the police station over the murders. The aswangs attack to capture Lex, but Makoy and Lex escape while Nestor and Nieves are arrested. The capture of Tope, a corrupt meat inspector who has become an aswang, proves that the killings were an aswang attack. Policemen Justiniani and Macapagal torture Tope for information about the aswangs' hideout.

Lex's tribe rescues her and Makoy, who is shot while fleeing gangsters and is treated by Lex. The tribe later asks Makoy to leave before an elder aswang arrives to help them oppose Dom. The elder is Veron, who recognises Makoy. After a tense confrontation, Veron spares him and allies with him against Dom.

Makoy returns to Nieves' house, but initially refuses to oppose Dom's business, remaining indifferent to the aswangs' conflict. He changes his mind after learning that Dom is sponsoring a free concert that night and plans to distribute the harmful hotdogs. Makoy, Nestor and Nieves plan to stop the delivery, and Makoy receives a new prosthetic arm.

Lex and Veron confront Dom over the missing council members. He admits killing them and captures both. Meanwhile, Justiniani and Macapagal arrive at Dom's hotdog factory with Makoy, Nestor and Nieves, but Dom's minions capture them. Justiniani and Macapagal are executed, while Makoy frees the others. Nestor and Nieves stop the meat shipment, while Lex and Veron defeat Dom's minions. Dom overpowers Makoy, but Makoy ultimately defeats him by remembering Nieves' words that he is brave.

After Dom's business closes, Veron returns Mackie to Makoy's car repair shop. Nestor finds a nametag bearing the name Mackie, revealing that Veron spared the boy and raised him. Dom's relatives mourn his death, while his wife promises his grieving mother that she will avenge him by taking revenge on Makoy.

== Cast ==
- Dingdong Dantes as Makoy
- Hannah Ledesma as Sonia
- Isabelle Daza as Lex
- Joey Marquez as Nestor
- Rina Reyes as Pacing
- Elizabeth Oropesa as Veron
- Lotlot de Leon as Nieves
- KC Montero as Dominic
- Julie Anne San Jose as Stacey
- Ramon Bautista as Justiniani
- Bogart The Explorer as Macapagal
- Abra as Benjie
- Jun Sabayton as Tope
- Ameer Henly as Macky
- Mona Louise Rey as aswang kid #1
- Alonzo Muhlach as aswang kid #2
- Erik Matti as Ketchup Man (cameo)
- Sherry Lara as Dom’s mother (cameo)
- Marian Rivera as Dom’s wife/Aswang Mourner (cameo)

== Casting ==
Lovi Poe did not reprise her role as Sonia from the first film after director Erik Matti and the producers stated that Poe's camp demanded a higher fee and backed out after learning her character was only needed for a two-day opening sequence. Poe was replaced by Hannah Ledesma as the character of Sonia.. Instead, Lovi Poe starred in the new horror anthology movie Shake, Rattle & Roll XV, which was also an official entry to the 40th Metro Manila Film Festival.

== Accolades ==
Year	Awards	Category	Recipient	Result	Ref.
2014	40th Metro Manila Film Festival	Best Picture	Kubot: The Aswang Chronicles 2	Nominated	
2014	40th Metro Manila Film Festival	Best Actor	Dingdong Dantes	Nominated	
2014	40th Metro Manila Film Festival	Best Supporting Actor	Joey Marquez	Won	
2014	40th Metro Manila Film Festival	Best Supporting Actress	Lotlot De Leon	Won	
2014	40th Metro Manila Film Festival	Best Production Design	Ericson Navarro	Won	
2014	40th Metro Manila Film Festival	Best Visual Effects	Mothership	Won	
2014	40th Metro Manila Film Festival	Best Make-up Artist	Juvan Bermil; Charles Alabado	Won	
