= Erik Matti =

Filipino filmmaker (born 1970)

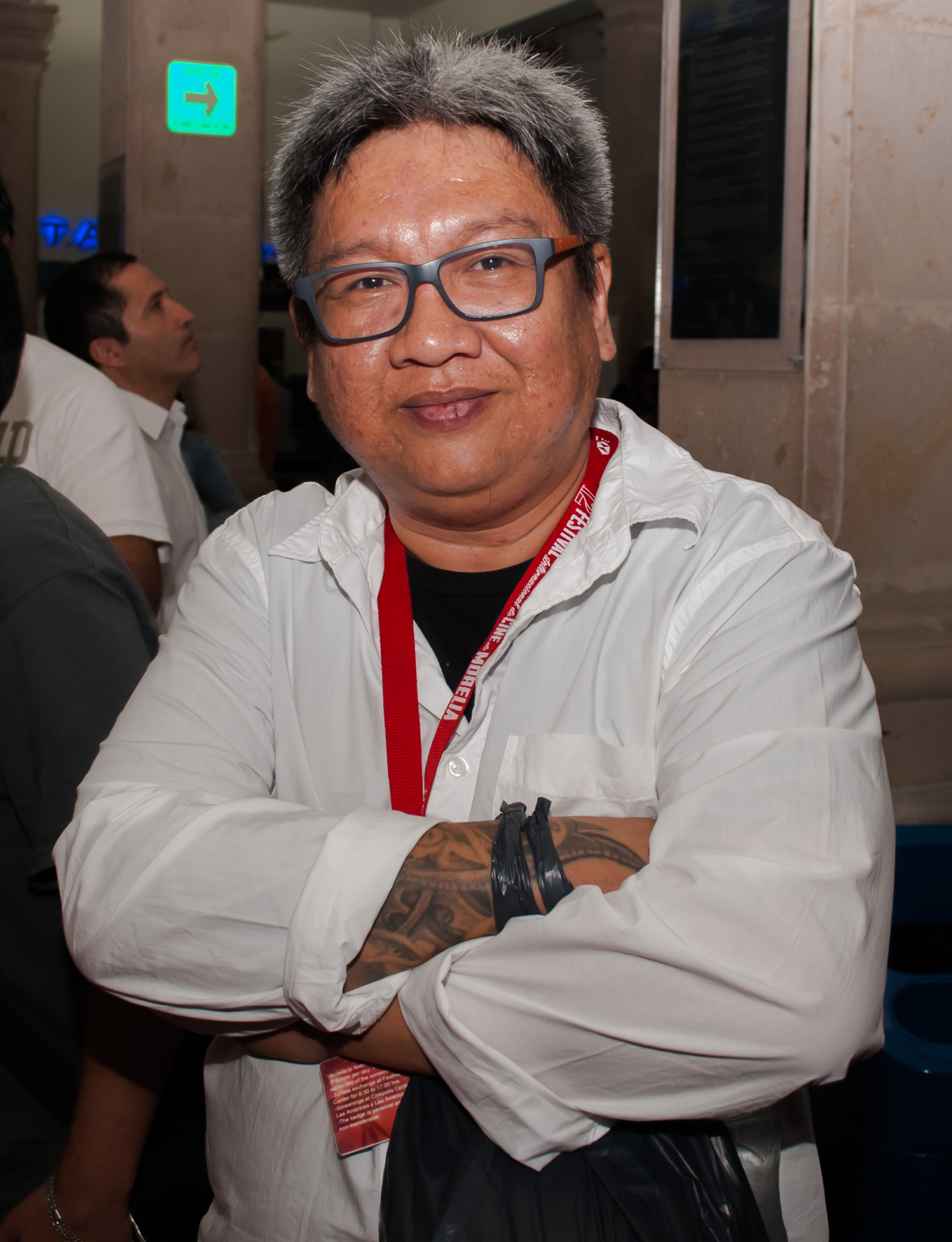
- Matti in 2014
- Born: December 21, 1970 (age 55); Bacolod, Negros Occidental, Philippines
- Education: Colegio San Agustin-Bacolod
- Alma mater: University of St. La Salle (withdrew)
- Occupation: Filmmaker
- Years active: 1995–present
- Spouse: Michiko Yamamoto
- Children: 2

Erik Matti (born December 21, 1970) is a Filipino filmmaker. He is known for directing On the Job (2013), Honor Thy Father (2015), Seklusyon (2016), BuyBust (2018), and On the Job: The Missing 8 (2021).

Matti co-founded the production company Reality Entertainment with Dondon Monteverde, son of film producer Lily Monteverde. Matti and Monteverde also co-founded the streaming service Upstream.

== Early life and education ==
Matti hails from Bacolod, the sixth and youngest child of Enrique, a customs agent, and Julieta, a government employee. Matti has credited his father, a frequent moviegoer whose preferences span a variety of genres, with sparking his interest in film.

Matti graduated from elementary and high school at Colegio San Agustin-Bacolod. He studied college at the University of St. La Salle for six years, during which he changed his major three times and spent his extracurricular activity in the school's theater company; he did not graduate. Matti taught private acting classes before deciding to become a filmmaker.

== Career ==
Erik Matti's career in the film industry began when he was hired to supervise the script continuity for the 1994 superhero film Mars Ravelo's Darna! Ang Pagbabalik.

A later project, the TV series The Squatter, won the development prize at 2024 Series Mania Seriesmakers section. The show was produced by Ronald Monteverde.

== Personal life ==
Matti is married to screenwriter Michiko Yamamoto, with whom he has two daughters. Politically he is an outspoken critic of Rodrigo Duterte, in part due to the Filipino president's proclamation of martial law during the Marawi crisis. As such, Matti sparked criticism for cursing at Duterte's supporters in social media.

== Filmography ==
=== Film ===
Year	Title	Director	Producer	Writer	Notes	Ref.
1994	Mars Ravelo's Darna! Ang Pagbabalik	No	No	No	As script continuity supervisor	
1996	Magic Temple	No	No	Yes		
1997	Magic Kingdom: Ang Alamat ng Damortis	No	No	Story		
1998	Gangland	No	Line	Yes	Also cameo appearance	
1999	Peque Gallaga's Scorpio Nights 2	Yes	No	Yes	Also actor	
1999	Ekis	Yes	No	Yes		
2000	Pedro Penduko: Episode II – The Return of the Comeback	Yes	No	No		
2001	Balahibong Pusa	No	Yes	Story		
2001	Sa Huling Paghihintay	Yes	Yes	Yes		
2001	Banyo Queen	No	Yes	No		
2001	Dos Ekis	Yes	Yes	Story	Also cameo appearance	
2002	Prosti	Yes	No	No		
2003	Mano Po 2: My Home	Yes	No	No		
2004	Gagamboy	Yes	No	Story	Also cameo appearance	
2004	Pa-siyam	Yes	Executive	Story		
2005	Exodus: Tales from the Enchanted Kingdom	Yes	No	No	Also voice actor	
2006	Binibining K	No	No	Story		
2008	Yanggaw	No	No	No	As actor, creative consultant	
2009	The Arrival	Yes	No	Yes		
2011	Rakenrol	No	Yes	No		
2012	Tiktik: The Aswang Chronicles	Yes	Yes	Yes		
2012	Rigodon	Yes	Yes	Story		
2013	On the Job	Yes	No	Yes		
2013	Kabisera	No	Yes	No		
2014	Kubot: The Aswang Chronicles 2	Yes	Yes	Story	Also an actor played as a Ketchup Man	
2014	ABCs of Death 2	Yes	No	Yes	Segment: "I Is for Invincible"	
2015	Honor Thy Father	Yes	Yes	Story		
2015	Resureksyon	No	Yes	Story		
2016	Seklusyon	Yes	Executive	No		
2017	Ang Pagsanib kay Leah dela Cruz	No	Yes	Story		
2018	BuyBust	Yes	Yes	Yes		
2019	Kuwaresma	Yes	Executive	Story		
2019	Watch List	No	Yes	No		
2021	A Girl and a Guy	Yes	Executive	Story		
2021	On the Job: The Missing 8	Yes	Yes	No		
2021	Rabid	Yes	Executive	No		
2026	On the Job: Maghari †	Yes				
2027	May Pagasa: The Battles of Andres Bonifacio †	Yes				

=== Television ===
Year	Title	Director	Producer	Writer	Note
2021	On the Job	Yes	Yes	Yes	
2026	BuyBust: The Undesirables †	Yes			

== Awards ==
Year	Award	Category	Work	Result	Ref.
1996	22nd Metro Manila Film Festival	Best Original Story	Magic Temple (with Peque Gallaga and Lore Reyes)	Won	
1996	22nd Metro Manila Film Festival	Best Screenplay	Magic Temple (with Peque Gallaga and Lore Reyes)	Won	
2014	30th PMPC Star Awards for Movies	Movie Cinematographer of the Year	On the Job	Won	
2014	30th PMPC Star Awards for Movies	Movie Director of the Year	On the Job	Won	
2015	41st Metro Manila Film Festival	Best Director	Honor Thy Father	Won	
2015	41st Metro Manila Film Festival	Best Original Story (with Michiko Yamamoto)	Honor Thy Father	Nominated	
2016	42nd Metro Manila Film Festival	Best Director	Seklusyon	Won	
2020	ContentAsia Awards	Best Director	Food Lore (episode: 'Island of Dreams')	Won	
2022	50th International Emmy Awards	Best TV Movie or Miniseries	On the Job	Nominated	
