= Reality MM Studios =

Philippine film production company

- 2018–2020 logo with the former name
- Type: Private
- Industry: Motion picture
- Founded: December 25, 2005; 20 years ago
- Headquarters: Makati, Philippines
- Key people: Erik Matti; Dondon Monteverde
- Website: reality.com.ph/

Reality MM Studios (formerly known as Reality Entertainment) is a Philippine film production company based in Makati. It was founded on December 25, 2005, and managed by the Filipino filmmaker Erik Matti and his producing partner Dondon Monteverde (son of the film producer Lily Monteverde).

== History ==
Reality Entertainment Inc. started in 2005 by Erik Matti. The last movie to use the Reality Entertainment name was the movie A Girl and a Guy which released in 2021. At the end of 2021, Reality Entertainment changed its name to Reality MM Studios with the first movie to use this name being On the Job: The Missing 8.

In 2025, in partnership with mm2 Entertainment, Reality MM Studios currently holds Philippine theatrical distribution rights to the Studio Ghibli catalogue.

== Filmography ==
Year	Title	Genre	Cast(s)	Director	Co-production
2005	Exodus: Tales from the Enchanted Kingdom	Fantasy	Ramon 'Bong' Revilla Jr.	Erik Matti	Imus Productions, Ignite Media and Enchanted Kingdom
2005	Shake, Rattle & Roll 2k5	Horror	Ai-Ai delas Alas, Gloria Romero, Yasmien Kurdi, Rainier Castillo, Marco Alcaraz, Ara Mina, Ogie Alcasid, Faisal Daquigan, Wilma Doesnt, Mark Anthony Fernandez, Tanya Garcia, Elizabeth Oropesa, Nonie Buencamino, Ronnie Lazaro	Uro dela Cruz, Rico Maria Ilarde, Richard Somes	Regal Entertainment and Ignite Media
2012	Rigodon	Romance, Thriller	Yam Concepcion, and John James Uy	Erik Matti	Viva Films
2012	Tiktik: The Aswang Chronicles	Horror, Fantasy, Adventure	Dingdong Dantes, Lovi Poe, Joey Marquez, Janice de Belen and Roi Vinzon	Erik Matti	AgostoDos Pictures, Mothership Inc., PostManila and GMA Films
2012	Corazon: Ang Unang Aswang	Horror, Thriller	Erich Gonzales, Derek Ramsay	Richard Somes	Skylight Films, Strawdogs Studio, and Star Cinema
2013	Kung Fu Divas	Action, Comedy	Ai Ai delas Alas and Marian Rivera	Onat Diaz	The O&Co. Picture Factory, Inc. and Star Cinema
2013	On the Job	Action, Thriller	Piolo Pascual and Gerald Anderson	Erik Matti	Star Cinema
2014	Kubot: The Aswang Chronicles 2	Horror, Fantasy, Adventure	Dingdong Dantes and Isabelle Daza	Erik Matti	AgostoDos Pictures and GMA Films
2015	Honor Thy Father	Action, Drama	John Lloyd Cruz, Meryll Soriano	Erik Matti	
2015	Resureksyon	Horror	Paulo Avelino, Isabelle Daza	Alfonso Torre III	Regal Entertainment
2016	Seklusyon	Horror, Thriller	Ronnie Alonte, Neil Ryan Sese, Rhed Bustamante, Dominic Roque	Erik Matti	
2018	BuyBust	Action, Thriller	Anne Curtis, Brandon Vera	Erik Matti	Viva Films
2019	Tol	Comedy	Arjo Atayde, Ketchup Eusebio, Joross Gamboa	Miko Livelo	
2019	Second Coming	Horror	Jodi Sta. Maria, Marvin Agustin	Jet Leyco	
2019	Kuwaresma	Horror	Sharon Cuneta, John Arcilla, Kent Gonzales, and Pam Gonzales	Erik Matti	Globe Studios
2019	And Ai, Thank You	Comedy	Ai-Ai delas Alas, Dennis Padilla, and Rufa Mae Quinto	Joven Tan	Horseshoe Studios
2019	Santigwar	Horror, Fantasy, Supernatural	Alexa Ilacad, Marlo Mortel, Paulo Angeles, Keann Johnson	Joven Tan	Horseshoe Studios
2021	A Girl and a Guy	Romantic comedy	Alexa Miro, Rob Gomez	Erik Matti	Regal Entertainment
2021	On the Job: The Missing 8	Action, Thriller	Dennis Trillo and John Arcilla	Erik Matti	Globe Studios
2021	Happy Times	Romantic comedy	Ricci Rivero, Sharlene San Pedro, and Heaven Peralejo	Ice Idanan	
2024	Strange Frequencies: Taiwan Killer Hospital	Horror	Enrique Gil, Jane de Leon, Alexa Miro, Rob Gomez, MJ Lastimosa Raf Pineda, and Ryan Azurin	Kerwin Go	Creative Leaders Group 8
2025	Rekonek	Family drama	Gerald Anderson, Bela Padilla, Andrea Brillantes, Charlie Dizon, Zoren Legaspi, Carmina Villarroel, Cassy Legaspi, Mavy Legaspi, and Gloria Diaz	Jade Castro	The Th3rd Floor Studios
2026	On the Job: Maghari	Action, Thriller	Coco Martin	Erik Matti	
2027	May Pagasa: The Battles of Andres Bonifacio	Historical drama	Coco Martin	Erik Matti	
