= Michiko Yamamoto (screenwriter) =

Filipina screenwriter

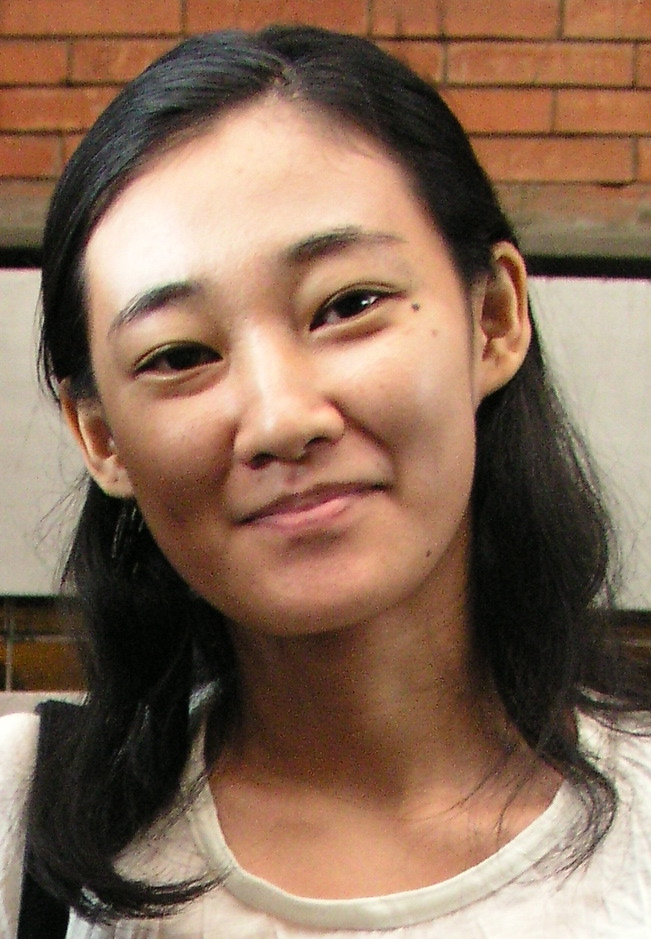
- Yamamoto in 2005
- Born: April 2, 1979 (age 47); Bulacan, Philippines
- Education: University of Santo Tomas (B.S.)
- Occupation: Screenwriter
- Notable work: Magnifico (2003); The Blossoming of Maximo Oliveros (2006); Remington and the Curse of the Zombadings (2013); On the Job (2013)
- Spouse: Erik Matti
- Children: 2

Michiko Yamamoto (山本 美智子, Yamamoto Michiko; born April 2, 1979) is a Filipino screenwriter. Her screenwriting credits include Magnifico (2003), The Blossoming of Maximo Oliveros (2006), Remington and the Curse of the Zombadings (2013), On the Job (2013), and Honor Thy Father (2015).

== Background ==
Yamamoto was born in 1979 in Bulacan, Philippines. Her father is a native of Japan who had separated from her Filipina mother. They had together Yamamoto and her two sisters, Mariko and Noriko. She has a half-sister from her mother's second marriage, Stephanie Jane.

Yamamoto attended Catholic schools and graduated from the University of Santo Tomas (UST) with a Bachelor of Science in math and computer studies.

She is married to director Erik Matti, with whom she has two daughters.

== Career ==
Before starting out as a screenwriter, Yamamoto worked for two years in Viva Entertainment doing post-production-related work, and in ABS-CBN. She attended the Film Development Council of the Philippines' screenwriting workshop in 1999.

Yamamoto's first screenwriting credit was for 2003's Magnifico, which reportedly won first place in a screenwriting contest. She said the Magnifico script was inspired by a personal experience she had with her late grandmother. In 2006, she wrote the screenplay for the gay-themed drama film The Blossoming of Maximo Oliveros, which was directed by Auraeus Solito in his feature film directorial debut. The film won the Jury Prize at the 2005 Cinemalaya Film Festival, and was the first to be produced by her own film outfit, UFO Pictures, Inc. In 2013, Yamamoto co-wrote Remington and the Curse of the Zombadings with Raymond Lee and Jade Castro, and On the Job with Erik Matti. She collaborated with Matti for 2014's Kubot: The Aswang Chronicles 2, and 2015's Honor Thy Father.

== Filmography ==
On Metacritic, a review aggregator, Yamamoto has an average career score of 62.

- Magnifico (2003)
- Santa Santita (2005)
- The Blossoming of Maximo Oliveros (2006)
- My Big Love (2008)
- Endo (2009)
- Remington and the Curse of the Zombadings (2013)
- On the Job (2013)
- Kubot: The Aswang Chronicles 2 (2014)
- Honor Thy Father (2015)
- On the Job 2: The Missing 8 (2021)

== Awards and nominations ==
Film	Award	Date of Ceremony	Category	Outcome	Note	Ref.
Endo	Young Critics Circle	August 11, 2008	Best Screenplay	Won	Shared with Jade Castro and Raymond Lee	
Endo	Gawad Urian	October 1, 2008	Best Screenplay	Won	Shared with Jade Castro and Raymond Lee	
