= Isabelle de Leon =

Filipino actress, singer-songwriter and beauty queen

- Born: Isabella Daza de Leon; July 30, 1994 (age 32); Manila, Philippines
- Height: 1.65 m (5 ft 5 in)
- Beauty pageant titleholder
- Title: Miss Multinational Philippines 2019
- Agency: Miss World Philippines Organization; GMA Network; GMA Artist Center (2000–2007; 2015–2020); ABS-CBN Entertainment; TV5
- Hair color: Dark Brown
- Eye color: Black
- Major competitions: Miss World Philippines 2019 (Winner - Miss Multinational Philippines 2019); Miss Multinational 2019 (No Pageant Held)

Isabella Daza de Leon (born July 30, 1994), also known as Isabelle de Leon, is a Filipino actress, singer-songwriter and beauty queen. She was a former child actress, known to many as Duday in GMA-7's sitcom Daddy Di Do Du (2001). She garnered a FAMAS Best Child Actress award for her role in Magnifico (2003). Isabelle was crowned as Miss Multinational Philippines at Miss World Philippines 2019. She was supposed to represent Philippines at the Miss Multinational pageant but it was postponed from 2020 to 2021 due to the pandemic.

== Career ==
Isabelle De Leon was featured in the title role of the GMA drama series Munting Anghel in 2000. She played Vic Sotto's daughter in the 2001-2007 sitcom Daddy Di Do Du. De Leon also appeared in a string of TV shows including Love to Love, Mulawin, Fantastikids, Mga Mata ni Anghelita and as Chrissy Altamira in Nasaan Ka, Elisa?. She also played the role of Digna in Maria Mercedes.

She also appeared in movies such as Magnifico, Bahay ni Lola, Super-B, Sanib, Padre de Pamilya, Litsonero and Soliloquy.

In 2013, she made her debut as a recording artist under PolyEast Records. She released her debut album, LoveZone, which consisted of original songs, all written by her. On September 13, 2014, she starred in the TV5 TV series Trenderas alongside Lara Maigue and A.K.A. Jam member Katrina Velarde. De Leon starred recently in a Wattpad entitled Diary ng Hindi Malandi, Slight Lang by Owwsic where she played the lead character Pilar Payoson a.k.a. Pipay. She also starred in another Wattpad series entitled Mistakenly Meant for You as the lead character Irina Sobel Samonte a.k.a. ICE.

In 2019, she has played as young Maricar de Mesa's character from Dragon Lady to opposite Bea Binene which portrays as young Diana Zubiri after her first antagonist in Magkaibang Mundo to opposite Louise delos Reyes.

In 2020, she went freelance and returned to ABS-CBN and is currently portraying the role of Marielle Lascano in the longest-running teleserye, Ang Probinsyano. De Leon will also co-bill a new drama show on TV5 titled Ate ng Ate Ko, along with Kris Bernal, Jake Cuenca, and Joem Bascon. Her role is Mayumi Gonzales.

== Filmography ==
=== Film ===
Year	Title	Role
2001	Ano Bang Meron Ka?	Paloma
2001	Bahay ni Lola	Aurora
2002	Super B	Wennie
2003	Magnifico	Helen
2003	Sanib	Magdalene "Magda" Santiago
2004	Kilig... Pintig... Yanig...	
2004	Santa Santita	Young church
2004	Lastikman: Unang Banat	Victim
2007	Bahay Kubo: A Pinoy Mano Po!	Jasmine
2009	Padre de Pamilya	Patricia Mirasol
2009	Litsonero	Shelia
2009	Soliloquy	
2014	My Big Bossing	
2018	Unli Life	Bella
2021	On the Job: The Missing 8	Joni Salas

=== Television series ===
Year	Title	Role
2000	Munting Anghel	Angelina
2001–2002	Ikaw Lang ang Mamahalin	Ninay San Pedro
2001–2007	Daddy Di Do Du	Donna "Duday" Vallejo
2004–2005	Mulawin	Mayi
2006	Fantastikids	Diana
2006	Ano Bang Hanap Mo?	Host
2007	Dalawang Tisoy	
2011–2012	Nasaan Ka, Elisa?	Christina "Chrissy" Altamira
2013–2014	Maria Mercedes	Digna Sancuevas
2014	Trenderas	Isabelle Raymundo
2015	Vampire ang Daddy Ko	
2016	Magkaibang Mundo	Sophia "Sofie" Sandoval Perez
2017	Meant to Be	PO1 Yumi Mercado
2017–2018	Super Ma'am	Rafa
2018	My Guitar Princess	Taylor Garcia
2019	Pepito Manaloto	Rochelle
2019	Dragon Lady	young Vera Lim
2019–2020	Madrasta	Judy Villas
2020	FPJ's Ang Probinsyano	PLt. (PInsp.) Marielle Lascano
2020–2021	Ate ng Ate Ko	Mayumi "Yumi" Gonzales

=== Drama Anthologies ===
Year	Title	Role
2003	Love to Love: Rich in Love	
2006	Magpakailanman: Larawan ng Katapatan sa Mata ng Isang Musmos	Cristina "Tinay" Bugayong
2012	Maynila: Faith in Love	Faith
2014	Wattpad Presents: Diary ng Hindi Malandi (Slight Lang!)	Pilar "Pipay" Payoson
2015	Wattpad Presents: Mistakenly Meant for You	Irina Sobel "Ice" Samonte
2015	Ipaglaban Mo: Sumpa ng Pagnanasa	Roberta
2015	Wattpad Presents: My Chinito	Lyra Sohano
2015	Maynila: Flowers 4 U	Carol
2016	Maynila: Beki Moves	Prima
2017	Karelasyon: Maid It	Charlotte
2017	Tadhana: Pinay For Sale	Jayme
2017	Magpakailanman: Mga Sikreto Ng Aking Pamilya	April
2018	Tadhana: Pinalayas si Inay	Sarah
2019	Tadhana: Amain	Nicole
2019	Maynila: The Bachelorette	Vera
2019	Wagas: Bakit Mahal Mo Kahit 'Di Kayo?	
2019	Tadhana: Macau Hero	Marife
2019	Dear Uge: Isko-lie ng Bayan!	Danica

== Discography ==
=== Album ===
- LoveZone (2013)
  - "1 Week to Move On"
  - "Feelingero"
  - "Friend Zone"
  - "Sa Yakap Mo"
  - "Alice Wonders"
  - "Pag-ibig Ko'y Sa'yo"

== Awards and nominations ==
- 2003 Best Child actress Pasado Award
- 2004 Best Child Actress FAMAS Award
- 2004 Best Child actress Gawad Tanglaw
- 2004 Most Popular Child Actress Guillermo mendoza memorial scholarship foundation
- 2004 Best supporting actress PMPC Star awards for Movies

All awards are won, and it's from the movie “MAGNIFICO”
