= Anima (film company) =

Philippine entertainment production company

ANIMA
- Formerly: Globe Studios (2016–2022)
- Company type: Division
- Industry: Film, podcast and television production
- Founded: 2016; 10 years ago
- Headquarters: Bonifacio Global City, Taguig, Metro Manila, Philippines
- Key people: Quark Henares
- Parent: Kroma Entertainment (Globe Telecom Group Retirement Fund)
- Website: anima.ph

Anima (stylized in uppercase), formerly known as Globe Studios, is a Filipino entertainment production company. It focuses on co-producing film, television and online series content.

Anima is owned by Kroma Entertainment (formerly Sphere Entertainment), a new entertainment company backed by Globe Telecom through its Retirement Fund agency.

== Filmography ==
Globe Studios (2016-2022).

=== Film ===
Title	Released date	Production company(ies)	Ref.
All of You	December 25, 2017	Quantum Films; MJM Productions; Planet A Media Productions	
Birdshot	August 16, 2017	PelikulaRED; Tuko Film Productions; CJ Entertainment	
Ang Panahon ng Halimaw	May 30, 2018	Sine Olivia Pilipinas; Epicmedia Productions	
Goyo: Ang Batang Heneral	September 5, 2018	TBA Studios; Artikulo Uno Productions	
Hintayan ng Langit	October 21, 2018	QCinema	
Kwaresma	May 15, 2019	Reality Entertainment	
LSS (Last Song Syndrome)	September 13, 2019	Dokimos Media Studios; Ben&Ben	
Dead Kids	December 1, 2019	Pelikula Red; Netflix	
Sunod	December 25, 2019	Ten17P	
Motel Acacia	March 11, 2020	Black Sheep Productions; Epic Media	
Fan Girl	December 25, 2020	Black Sheep Productions; Project 8 Corner San Joaquin Projects; Epic Media; Crossword Productions	
Midnight in a Perfect World	January 29, 2021	Epic Media	
Whether The Weather Is Fine	August 9, 2021; December 25, 2021	Black Sheep Productions; Quantum Films; Cinematografica; Plan C; iWant TFC; Dreamscape Entertainment	
Leonor Will Never Die	August 5, 2022	Arkeofilms; Cinemalaya	
Where Is the Lie? (Marupok AF)	January 22, 2023	Firstcutlab; Cinemalaya	
Sunshine	July 23, 2025	Project 8 Projects; Cloudy Duck Pictures; Happy Infinite Productions	

=== Television and online ===
Title	Date	Production company(ies)	Network	Ref.
Gaya sa Pelikula (Like in the Movies)	September 25, 2020	self-produced	YouTube (ANIMA Studios official channel)	
On the Job	September 12, 2021	HBO Asia; Reality Entertainment	HBO GO	
ERO	August 29, 2022	self-produced	YouTube (ANIMA Studios official channel)	
Simula sa Gitna	November 2, 2023	Project 8	Prime Video	
Marahuyo Project	June 24, 2024	self-produced	YouTube (ANIMA Studios official channel)	
How to Cheat Death	April 2, 2025	self-produced	Netflix (Southeast Asia)	

=== Music videos ===
Title	Performer	Date	Production company(ies)	Ref.
Araw-Araw	Ben&Ben	September 25, 2019	self-produced	
Black & White	IV of Spades	September 16, 2022	self-produced	

== Podcast shows ==
Title	Genre	Host(s)
All Things K	Talk, Korean pop culture	Kring Kim, Jimmy Kim
Ang Walang Kwentang Podcast	Talk	Antoinette Jadaone, JP Habac
Buhay Basket	Sports	—N/a
Clockwork	Talk, Business	Edu Manzano
Dramabuds	Talk	Francine Putong
Endslate	Talk, Pop culture	Ramon de Veyra, Quark Henares, Mel Lozano-Alcaraz
Ganito Kasi 'Yan!	Society, culture	Jacob Maquiling, Lance Arevada
Huwag 'Tong Makakalabas	Talk	Juan Miguel Severo
The Karen Davila Podcast	Talk	Karen Davila
Kwentong Callroom	Personal stories, Talk	JB Besa, Ella Masamayor
Kwentong Creatives	Talk	Gio Puyat
Lecheng Pag-ibig To!	Relationships	Sam YG, DJ Chacha
The Linya-Linya Show	Talk	Ali Sangalang
May Prescription Ba Sa Life? (Note: In partnership with UNILAB.)	Society and culture	Justin Quirino, Dr. Sharae Chua
Nandito Sila	Horror	—N/a
Paano Ba 'To?	Talk, Society and culture	Bianca Gonzalez
Soulful Feasts	Health, Fitness	Stephanie Zubiri
Tawa, Let's!	Comedy, Talk	Aryn Cristobal
Toast/Roast	Music, talk	Francis Brew Reyes, Kim Marvilla
Wonder After Dark	Society and culture, Sex and relationships	—N/a
