= Isabelle Daza =

Filipino actress, model and host (born 1988)

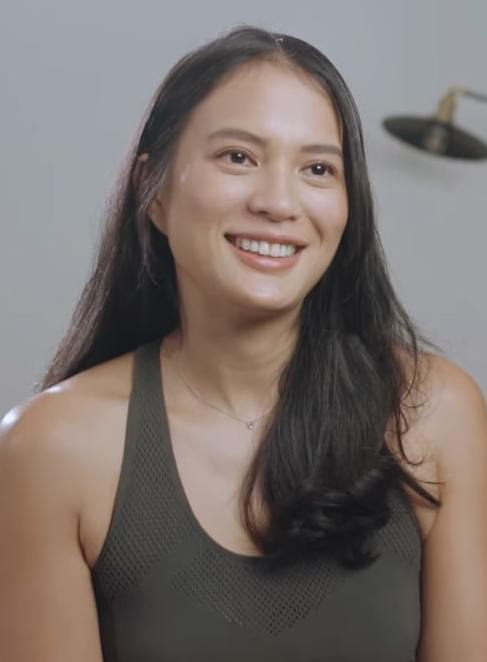
- Daza in 2019
- Born: Isabelle Diaz Daza; March 6, 1988 (age 38); Manila, Philippines
- Education: De La Salle University (BS)
- Occupations: Actress, TV host, model, Entrepreneur
- Years active: 2005–present
- Agents: GMA Artist Center (2011–2014) APT Entertainment (2011–2014) Star Magic (2014–2020); Brightlight Productions (2020–present)
- Spouse: Adrien Semblat (m. 2016)
- Children: 3
- Mother: Gloria Diaz
- Relatives: Nora Daza (grandmother); Rio Diaz (aunt); Jaime Cojuangco (cousin); Georgina Wilson (maternal cousin); Mikael Daez (cousin)

Isabelle Diaz Daza-Semblat (Tagalog: [ɪsaˈbɛl ˈdɪas ˈdasa sɛmˈblɐ]; born March 6, 1988) is a Filipino actress, television host and model. She is the daughter of Miss Universe 1969 titleholder, Gloria Diaz. She was a member of GMA Network's roster of young talents and was introduced to the mass media entertainment audiences during a dance number on the noontime show Party Pilipinas on April 17, 2011. On November 24, 2014, Daza transferred to ABS-CBN and signed a two-year exclusive contract. She gained recognition for her role in the drama series Tubig at Langis.

== Early life and education ==
Isabelle Daza is the daughter of Gloria Diaz, the Miss Universe 1969 titleholder, and Gabriel "Bong" Daza III, a restaurateur and former Makati city councilor. Her grandmother is chef Nora Daza. She has an older brother and a younger sister, Ava. Her parents separated when she was seven years old; however, they remained good friends.

In 2010, she earned her bachelor's degree in early childhood education from De La Salle University.

== Career ==
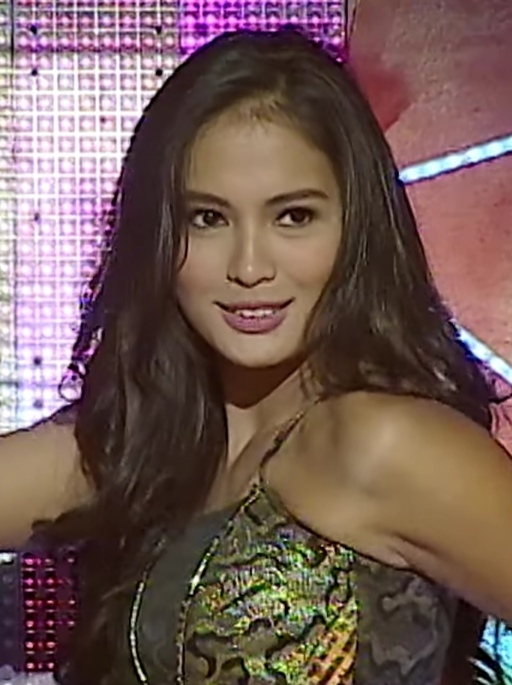
Daza on Eat Bulaga! in 2019

Daza started her career in 2005 as a print and ramp model. After graduating from De La Salle University, she worked as a preschool teacher. She signed a contract with Sparkle GMA Artist Center with her manager, Leo Domingez, and made her debut on Party Pilipinas. In an interview with The Philippine Star, Daza admits that she is still trying to "figure out" her career in acting and she is continuously taking workshops, but her main interest is in hosting. Her first attempt in TV hosting was on a game show with boxing champion Manny Pacquiao, entitled Show Me Da Manny (later renamed Manny Many Prizes.) On August 2, 2011, Daza was launched as the New Face of Sophie Paris Philippines. In late December 2011, Daza joined the longest-running noontime show Eat Bulaga! where she later became a regular co-host.

In 2014, Daza signed a two-year exclusive contract with ABS-CBN. She appeared in the 2015 fantasy drama series Nathaniel starring Marco Masa. She eventually became popular for her major role as Clara in the 2016 melodrama series Tubig at Langis with Cristine Reyes and Zanjoe Marudo. Later on, Daza continues to collaborate with Marudo in the 2018 romantic comedy series Playhouse (with Angelica Panganiban and JJ Quilantang) and for an episode in the drama anthology Maalaala Mo Kaya. After the pandemic, she appeared in guest stints for the ABS-CBN-backed series 2 Good 2 Be True, Can't Buy Me Love, and The Alibi

== Personal life ==
Her paternal great-great-grandfather Olimpio Guanzon, was a Governor of Pampanga from 1922 to 1925.

In February 2016, Daza confirmed her engagement with French businessman Adrien Semblat, her boyfriend of seven years. The couple married on September 10, 2016, at the San Francesco Church in Tuscany, Italy. The wedding was officiated by Daza's uncle, Fr. Fidel Orendain. Accordingly, it was her godfather, former senator (later president) Bongbong Marcos, who walked her down the aisle on her wedding day. Marcos was the best friend of her father, Gabriel "Bong" Daza III, who had died on July 14 that year.

On April 1, 2018, Daza gave birth to her first child. In December 2020, Daza announced that she and Semblat were expecting their second child. Their second child was born on April 9, 2021. Their third child was born on March 23, 2023.

As of 2020, Daza and her family live in Hong Kong, having moved there due to her husband's job as managing director of Puma's Hong Kong and Macau operations.

== Filmography ==
=== Film ===
Year	Title	Role
2013	It Takes a Man and a Woman	Belle Montenegro
2013	Lihis	Ada
2014	Basement	Rebecca Sanchez
2014	Somebody to Love	Valeria
2014	Kubot: The Aswang Chronicles	Lex
2015	Resureksyon	Mara

=== Television ===
Year	Title	Role	Ref.
2011	Miss World Philippines 2011	Herself	Host
2011–2014; 2020	Eat Bulaga!	Herself	Host
2011	Manny Many Prizes	Herself	Host
2011	Futbolilits	Claudette	Recurring role
2011	Spooky Nights	Mary Anne	Episode: "The Mommy Returns"
2011–2013	Party Pilipinas	Herself	Performer
2012	iBilib	Herself	Guest host
2012	Spooky Nights	Mabel	Episode: "Korona"
2012	Faithfully	Misha Villar	
2012	Taste Buddies	Herself	Host
2013	Indio	Magwayen	
2013	Genesis	Helen	
2014	Magpakailanman	Clemen	Episode: "Ang Aking Kakaibang Pag-Ibig"
2014	Niño	Claire	Special participation
2014	ASAP	Herself	
2015	Maalaala Mo Kaya	Myra	Episode: "Manika"
2015	Nathaniel	Atty. Martha Amanthe	
2016	Tubig at Langis	Clara Samaniego	
2017	Ipaglaban Mo!	Jessica	Episode: "Mental"
2017	Maalaala Mo Kaya	Rosalyn	Episode: "Upuan"
2018–2019	Playhouse	Lea Samonte	
2019	Maalaala Mo Kaya	Acel Asenio	Episode: "Balsa"
2020	Ipaglaban Mo!	Marge	Episode: "Himlayan"
2020–2022	Lunch Out Loud	Herself	
2025–2026	The Alibi	Dra. Ramona Castro	
2026–2027	Sigabo	Elena Campilan	

== Awards and nominations ==
Year	Award	Category	Nominated work	Result
2011	FHM Philippines	Top 10 Sexiest Women	None	Rank # 69
2012	26th PMPC Star Awards for TV	Best New Female TV Personality	Eat Bulaga!	Nominated
2013	27th PMPC Star Awards for TV	Best Game Show Host	Manny Many Prizes	Nominated
2014	30th PMPC Star Awards for Movies	New Movie Actress of the Year	It Takes a Man and a Woman	Nominated
2014	Dabarkads Awards	Best Actress	Kulungan Kanlugan	Won
2014	28th PMPC Star Awards for TV	Best Lifestyle Show Host	Taste Buddies	Nominated
2014	11th Golden Screen Awards	Breakthrough Performance by an Actress	Lihis	Nominated
