= Joey Marquez =

Filipino actor and politician

The Honorable Joey Marquez

Mayor of Parañaque
- In office June 30, 1995 – June 30, 2004
- Vice Mayor: Tomas Banaga Jr. (1995–1998); Florencio Bernabe Jr. (1998–2004)
- Preceded by: Pablo Olivarez
- Succeeded by: Florencio Bernabe Jr.

Vice Mayor of Parañaque
- In office June 30, 1992 – June 30, 1995
- Mayor: Pablo Olivarez
- Succeeded by: Tomas Banaga Jr.

Personal details
- Born: Artemio Perez Marquez Jr. October 7, 1957 (age 69) Mabalacat, Pampanga, Philippines
- Party: Independent (2010–present)
- Other political affiliations: Lakas (until 2010)
- Spouse: Alma Moreno (m. 1989; ann. 2004)
- Children: 16 (including Winwyn and Zia)
- Relatives: Melanie Marquez (sister); Michelle Dee (niece)
- Occupation: Actor, TV director, host, politician, former basketball player
- Basketball career

Personal information
- Listed height: 6 ft 2 in (1.88 m)

Career information
- High school: Arellano (Manila)
- College: AUF
- Playing career: 1981–1987
- Position: Small forward
- Number: 66, 33, 6

Career history
- 1981–1983: Presto Fun Drinks / Great Taste Coffee Makers
- 1984–1986: Gilbey's Gin Tonics / Ginebra San Miguel
- 1987: Hills Bros. Coffee Kings

Career highlights
- PBA champion (1986 Open)

Joselito "Joey" Perez Marquez (Tagalog pronunciation: [maɾˈkɛs]; born Artemio Perez Marquez Jr.; October 7, 1957) is a Filipino actor, comedian, politician, and former professional basketball player in the Philippine Basketball Association (PBA).

He was born to the late film director Artemio Marquez Sr. and Teresita Esguera Perez. His siblings include Via Marquez Hoffman and Melanie Marquez. He served as mayor of Parañaque from 1995 to 2004. He ran again as mayor of Parañaque in 2010, but lost to the incumbent, Florencio Bernabe Jr. He also unsuccessfully ran for representative of Parañaque's 2nd district in 2004 and in 2013. He has retired from politics to focus on his acting career. He is a contract artist of ABS-CBN and GMA Network. Before embarking on a career as an actor-comedian, Marquez played for Presto Fun Drinks, later known as the Great Taste Coffee Makers, from 1981 to 1983 before moving to Gilbey's Gin Tonics, which would later be popularly known as Barangay Ginebra San Miguel, under player-coach Robert Jaworski beginning the 1984 season. He played briefly for Hills Bros. Coffee Kings in 1987 before leaving the game for good to become a full-time actor.

== TV career ==
Marquez was one of the 1987 cast of seven in Palibhasa Lalake, the sitcom on Philippine television spanning 12 years, with Richard Gomez, Gloria Romero, Cynthia Patag, Amy Perez, Carmina Villarroel, and Apa Ongpin. Marquez was included in the S-Files roster of hosts after he successfully pinch-hit for Paolo Bediones when Paolo went to the US to interview some famous Hollywood celebrities to be featured on the show.

== Filmography ==
=== Film ===
- Tagos ng Dugo (1987)
- Susuko Na Ba Ako, Inay? (1987)
- Kumander Gringa (1987)
- Bobo Cop (1988) - Renato Dalmacio
- Stomach In, Chest Out (1988) - Sarhento
- Eastwood & Bronson: Palibhasa Detektib (1989)
- Tamis ng Unang Halik (1989)
- Isang Araw Walang Diyos (1989)
- Bikining Itim (Viva Films, 1990)
- Shake, Rattle & Roll II (1990)
- Darna (Viva Films, 1991)
- Banana Split (Basta Driver Sweet Lover) (1991)
- Shake, Rattle & Roll III (segment "Nanay", 1991) – Ojay
- Mahal.... Saan Ka Natulog Kagabi (1992)
- Ging Gang Gooly Giddiyap: I Love You Daddy (1994) – Don Arnaldo/King Arthur
- Hari ng Yabang (Golden Tower Films, 1997) – Tolome/Himself (as Mayor of Paranaque)
- Hey Babe! (1999)
- Asboobs: Asal Bobo (2003)
- Utang ng Ama (2003)
- I Wanna Be Happy (2006)
- Catch Me, I'm in Love (2011)
- Tiktik: The Aswang Chronicles (2012) – Nestor
- Raketeros (2013)
- On the Job (2013)
- Girl, Boy, Bakla, Tomboy (2013)
- Da Possessed (2014) – Demetrio "Don Demetrio" Demetrio
- So It's You (2014) – Dado
- Kubot: The Aswang Chronicles 2 (2014)
- Barcelona: A Love Untold (2016) – Caloy Antonio
- My Ex and Whys (2017) – Lincoln "Master Pops" Martinez
- Finally Found Someone (2017) – Pondong Esguerra
- Woke Up Like This (2017) – Tsong/Tatay
- Last Night (2017) – Ricardo "Mang Rick" Reyes
- Haunted Forest (2017) – Nardo
- Sid & Aya: Not a Love Story (Viva Films, 2018)
- Unli Life (2018)
- Sol Searching (2018)
- Papa Pogi (2019)
- Boy Tokwa: Lodi ng Gapo (2019)
- S.O.N.S: Sons of Nanay Sabel (2019)
- 3pol Trobol: Huli Ka Balbon! (2019) – Joseph Pahak
- Boyette: Not a Girl Yet (2020)
- On The Job 2: The Missing 8 (2021)
- Day Zero (2022) – Oscar
- 2 Valid IDs (2026) - Ramon

=== Television ===
==== As actor ====
Year	Title	Role
1987	Palibhasa Lalake	Joselito / Joey
1999	Kool Ka Lang	Mags
2003–07	Lagot Ka... Isusumbong Kita!	Tsong
2003–07	S-Files	Himself (host)
2006	Love to Love: Jass Got Lucky	Coach Gabby
2007	Mga Kuwento ni Lola Basyang: Ang Parusa ng Duwende	Mang Dencio
2007	Fantastic Man	Prof. Manalo
2007	Who's Your Daddy Now?	Peter Gomez
2007–08	Kung Ako Ikaw	Himself (host)
2009	Adik Sa'Yo	Luigi Maglipot
2010	Kaya ng Powers	Robert Powers
2010	Love Bug Presents: Say I Do	Ulysses
2010	Talentadong Pinoy	Guest judge
2011	Hap-ier Together	
2011	Sugo Mga Kapatid	Paeng
2011	Showtime	Himself (guest judge)
2012	Showbiz Inside Report	Himself (host)
2012	Maalaala Mo Kaya: Belen	Persie
2012	Toda Max	Daniel
2013	Maalaala Mo Kaya: Make-up	Romy
2013	Maalaala Mo Kaya: Cake	Tony
2014	Paraiso Ko'y Ikaw	Artemio Enriquez
2014	Maalaala Mo Kaya: Bus	Ernesto
2014	Maalaala Mo Kaya: Saklay	Juan
2014	Forevermore	Buboy "Papang / Mang Bubs" Calay
2015	Tunay na Buhay	Himself
2015	Maalaala Mo Kaya: Sinigang	Renato
2015	FPJ's Ang Probinsyano	Nanding Corpuz
2015	Celebrity Playtime	KomedyanTeam
2016–17	It's Showtime	Himself / co-host
2016	Maalaala Mo Kaya: Kadena	Bernard
2017	My Dear Heart	Tope Estanislao
2017	La Luna Sangre	Rodolfo Mallari
2018	Since I Found You	Gregorio "Mang Gerry" Punzalan
2018	Daddy's Gurl	Jun
2019	Maalaala Mo Kaya: Balsa	Ramon
2019	Pamilya Ko	Fernando Potenciano "Fernan" Mabunga
2021	Gen Z	Ernie Castro
2021	Init sa Magdamag	Miguel Salcedo
2021	Maalaala Mo Kaya: Taho	Gimmy
2021	Niña Niño	Daniel
2022	Bolera	Freddie Roldan
2022	Oh My Korona!	Louie
2023	The Iron Heart	Lt. Gen. David Manzano
2023–25	FPJ's Batang Quiapo	SPO1 Edilberto "Berting" Oliva
2026	The Master Cutter	Delfin
2026–present	Sigabo	Rudy Magtibay

==== As director only ====
Year	Title	Notes
1994–1995	Tondominium	

=== Video games ===
- Barangay Basketball (Synergy 88 Studios, 2016)

== Acting awards ==
- Winner, Movie Supporting Actor of the Year for On the Job - 2014 PMPC Star Awards for Movies
- Winner, Best Supporting Actor for Kubot: The Aswang Chronicles 2 - 2014 Metro Manila Film Festival
- Nominated, Best Supporting Actor for I'mperfect - 2025 Metro Manila Film Festival

== Political positions ==
- Municipal Vice Mayor of Parañaque, 1992 to 1995
- Municipal/City Mayor of Parañaque, 1995 to 2004

== Educational background ==
- College – Angeles University, BSC – Bachelor of Science in commerce, major in Accounting
