= List of awards and nominations received by Alessandra de Rossi =

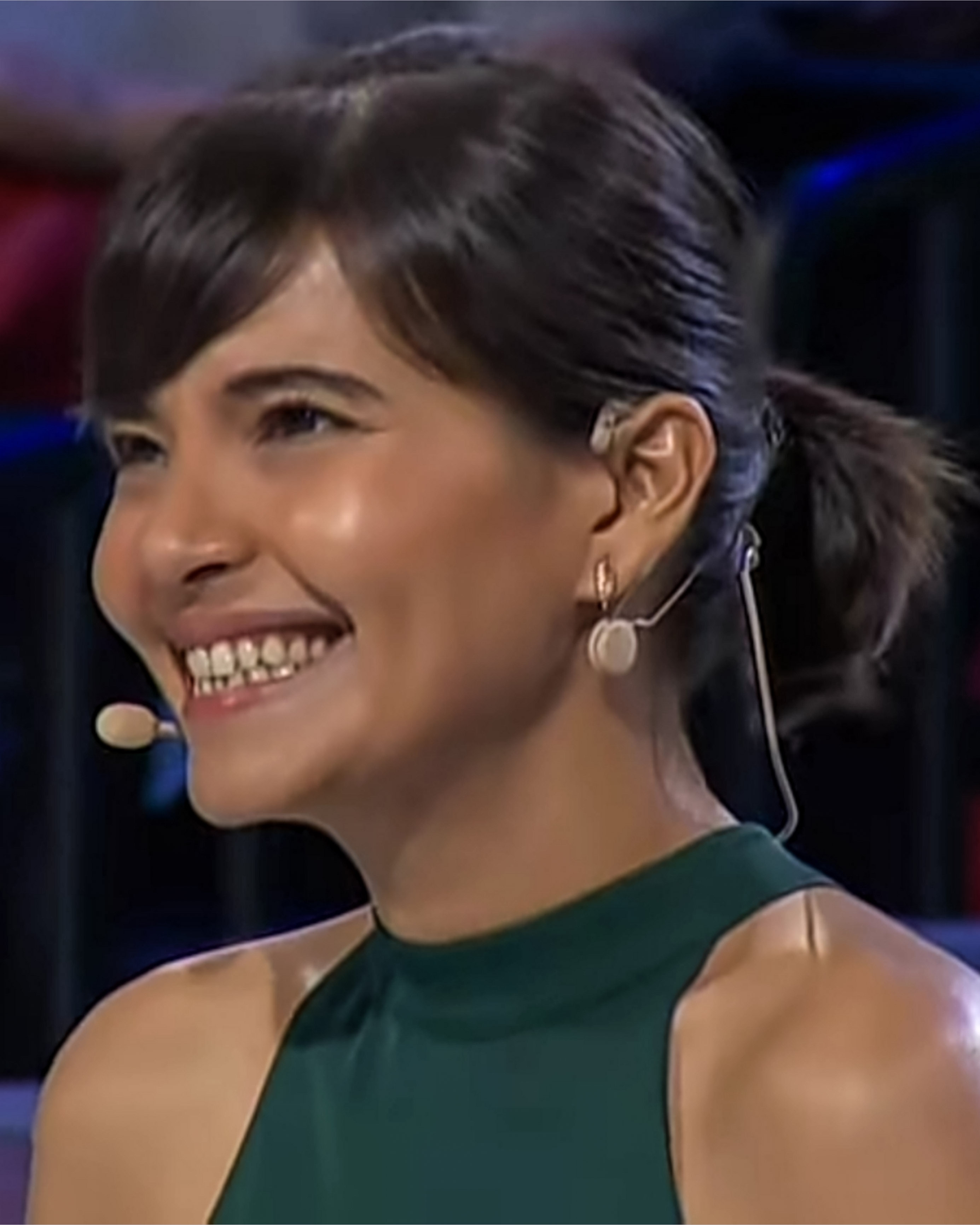
De Rossi in 2020

Alessandra De Rossi is a Filipino actress and writer who has received various accolades for her work in film and television which span 20 years. Often described by critics as one of the best actresses of her generation, she was named "Actress of the Decade" alongside Nora Aunor and Angeli Bayani at the 44th Gawad Urian Awards. At age 18, she became the youngest artist to be nominated in the best actress category at the 2003 PMPC Star Awards for Movies.

De Rossi's performances in Azucena (2000), Mga Munting Tining (2002) and Watch List (2019) have earned her major nominations in both the FAMAS and Gawad Urian Awards. In 2000, she was nominated for Best Actress at the Valladolid International Film Festival in Spain for her portrayal in the film Azucena, which is the first Filipino film to compete in the film festival. In 2014, she was honored with the Ani ng Dangal for Cinema by the National Commission for Culture and the Arts. In 2018, she was named one of the "Most Influential Film Actresses of the Year" by the EdukCircle Awards for the blockbuster film Kita Kita opposite Empoy Marquez, which is the highest grossing Filipino independent film of all time. Her portrayal as Lea earned her Best Actress nominations at the Gawad Urian, Luna and Star Awards for Movies. In television, her roles in Darna (2005), Tayong Dalawa (2009), Legacy (2012) and Ang Dalawang Mrs. Real (2014) have also earned her various accolades from local award-giving bodies.

Among her other acclaimed performances in films include Ka Oryang (2011), The Palawan Script (2013), Bambanti (2015), Lucid (2019) and Watch List (2019) for which she was nominated for Best Actress for the first four and won for the latter, as well as Wretched Lives (2001), Sta. Niña (2012), Mater Dolorosa (2012) and Mauban: Ang Resiko (2014) for which she was nominated for Best Supporting Actress at the Gawad Urian Awards. Moreover, her other films such as The Cory Quirino Kidnap: NBI Files (2003) and Kutob (2005) have also earned her nominations for Best Supporting Actress at the FAMAS Awards. Her roles in Hubog (2001), Kid Kulafu (2015), Through Night and Day (2018) and My Amanda (2021) have also earned her major nominations at the Star Awards for Movies and Luna Awards.

== Awards and nominations ==
Awards and nominations received by Alessandra de Rossi
Award (Note: Awards, festivals, honors and other miscellaneous organizations are listed in alphabetical order.)	Year (Note: Indicates the year of ceremony. Each year is linked to the article about the awards held that year, wherever possible.)	Category	Nominated work	Result	Ref.
Ani ng Dangal Awards	2014	Harvest of Honors for Cinema	Herself	Won	
Associazione Internazionale Pugliesi nel Mondo	2011	Pugliesi nel Mondo	Herself	Won	
ASEAN International Film Festival and Awards	2013	Best Actress	Sta. Niña	Won	
Box Office Entertainment Awards	2001	Most Promising Actress	Azucena	Won	
Box Office Entertainment Awards	2018	Breakthrough Love Team of Movies and TV	Kita Kita	Won	
Box Office Entertainment Awards	2024	Movie Supporting Actress of the Year	Firefly	Won	
CineFilipino Film Festival	2016	Best Actress	Sakaling Hindi Makarating	Nominated	
Cinema One Originals Digital Film Festival	2013	Best Actress	Woman of the Ruins	Nominated	
Cinema One Originals Digital Film Festival	2019	Best Actress	Lucid	Won	
EdukCircle Awards	2018	Most Influential Film Actress of the Year	Kita Kita	Won	
Entertainment Editors' Choice Awards	2018	Best Actress	Kita Kita	Nominated	
Entertainment Editors' Choice Awards	2018	Best Original Theme Song	12	Nominated	
Entertainment Editors' Choice Awards	2019	Best Original Theme Song	Sid & Aya: Not a Love Story	Nominated	
Entertainment Editors' Choice Awards	2022	Best Actress	My Amanda	Nominated	
FAMAS Awards	2001	Best Supporting Actress	Azucena	Won	
FAMAS Awards	2003	German Moreno Youth Achievement Award	Herself	Won	
FAMAS Awards	2003	Best Actress	Mga Munting Tinig	Nominated	
FAMAS Awards	2004	Best Supporting Actress	The Cory Quirino Kidnap: NBI Files	Nominated	
FAMAS Awards	2006	Best Supporting Actress	Kutob	Nominated	
FAMAS Awards	2019	Best Original Song	Heartbeats (From Sid & Aya: Not a Love Story) with Chris Valera	Nominated	
FAMAS Awards	2021	Best Actress	Watch List	Won	
FAMAS Awards	2024	Best Supporting Actress	Firefly	Nominated	
FAMAS Awards	2025	Best Supporting Actress	Green Bones	Nominated	
Gawad Lasallianeta Awards	2022	Most Outstanding Performance by an Actress in a film	My Amanda	Won	
Gawad Urian Awards	2001	Best Actress	Azucena	Nominated	
Gawad Urian Awards	2002	Best Supporting Actress	Wretched Lives	Nominated	
Gawad Urian Awards	2003	Best Actress	Mga Munting Tinig	Nominated	
Gawad Urian Awards	2012	Best Actress	Ka Oryang	Nominated	
Gawad Urian Awards	2013	Best Actress	The Palawan Script	Nominated	
Gawad Urian Awards	2013	Best Supporting Actress	Sta. Niña	Won	
Gawad Urian Awards	2013	Best Supporting Actress	Mater Dolorosa	Nominated	
Gawad Urian Awards	2015	Best Supporting Actress	Mauban: Ang Resiko	Nominated	
Gawad Urian Awards	2016	Best Music	Watermelon	Nominated	
Gawad Urian Awards	2016	Best Actress	Bambanti	Nominated	
Gawad Urian Awards	2018	Best Actress	Kita Kita	Nominated	
Gawad Urian Awards	2020	Best Actress	Lucid	Nominated	
Gawad Urian Awards	2021	Best Actress	Watch List	Won	
Gawad Urian Awards	2021	Best Actress of the Decade	Herself	Won	
Gawad Urian Awards	2024	Best Supporting Actress	Firefly	Nominated	
Gawad Tanglaw Awards	2010	Best Ensemble Performance in a Television Drama	Tayong Dalawa	Won	
GEMS Hiyas ng Sining Awards	2022	Best Actress	My Amanda	Nominated	
Golden Screen TV Awards	2005	Outstanding Supporting Actress in a Drama series	Darna	Nominated	
Golden Screen TV Awards	2013	Outstanding Performance by an Actress in a Drama Series	Legacy	Nominated	
Golden Screen TV Awards	2015	Outstanding Supporting Actress in a Drama Program	Ang Dalawang Mrs. Real	Won	
Kagitingan Awards for Television	2016	Pinakamagiting na Personalidad sa Programang Dulang Antolohiya (Drama Anthology)	Wagas: Michael & Imelda Story	Won	
Luna Awards	2002	Best Supporting Actress	Hubog	Nominated	
Luna Awards	2016	Best Supporting Actress	Kid Kulafu	Nominated	
Luna Awards	2018	Best Actress	Kita Kita	Nominated	
Manila International Film Festival	2024	Best Supporting Actress	Firefly	Won	
Metro Manila Film Festival	2004	Best Actress	Homecoming	Nominated	
Metro Manila Film Festival	2010	Best Supporting Actress	Dalaw	Nominated	
Metro Manila Film Festival	2023	Best Supporting Actress	Firefly	Nominated	
PMPC Star Awards for Movies	2003	Best Actress	Munting Tinig	Nominated	
PMPC Star Awards for Movies	2013	Movie Supporting Actress of the Year	Mater Dolorosa	Nominated	
PMPC Star Awards for Movies	2016	Indie Movie Original Theme Song of the Year	Tulog Na (From Bambanti) with Zig Madamba Dulay and Gian Gianan	Won	
PMPC Star Awards for Movies	2016	Movie Supporting Actress of the Year	Kid Kulafu	Won	
PMPC Star Awards for Movies	2017	Indie Movie Original Theme Song of the Year	Saan Man (From Sakaling Hindi Makarating) with Giancarlo Abrahan and Mon Espia	Nominated	
PMPC Star Awards for Movies	2018	Movie Original Theme Song of the Year	Twelve (From 12) with Marc Abaya	Nominated	
PMPC Star Awards for Movies	2018	Movie Actress of the Year	Kita Kita	Nominated	
PMPC Star Awards for Movies	2019	Movie Actress of the Year	Through Night and Day	Nominated	
PMPC Star Awards for Movies	2019	Movie Screenwriter of the Year	Through Night and Day	Nominated	
PMPC Star Awards for Movies	2022	Movie Actress of the Year (tied with Sylvia Sanchez)	Watch List	Won	
PMPC Star Awards for Movies	2023	Movie Actress of the Year	My Amanda	Nominated	
PMPC Star Awards for Movies	2023	Movie Director of the Year	My Amanda	Nominated	
PMPC Star Awards for Movies	2023	Movie Screenwriter of the Year	My Amanda	Nominated	
PMPC Star Awards for Movies	2024	Movie Actress of the Year	What If	Nominated	
PMPC Star Awards for Movies	2024	Movie Supporting Actress of the Year	Firefly	Nominated	
PMPC Star Awards for Television	2005	Female Star of the Night	Herself	Won	
PMPC Star Awards for Television	2006	Best Single Performance by an Actress	Pag-ahon sa Lusak	Nominated	
PMPC Star Awards for Television	2009	Best Single Performance by an Actress	Pedicab	Nominated	
PMPC Star Awards for Television	2011	Best Single Performance by an Actress	Pera	Nominated	
PMPC Star Awards for Television	2015	Best Single Performance by an Actress	Sabit-sabit, Kabit-kabit, Mga Pusong Malupit	Nominated	
PMPC Star Awards for Television	2021	Best Single Performance by an Actress	Sisters at War	Nominated	
QCinema International Film Festival	2014	Best Actress	Mauban: Ang Resiko	Won	
Sinag Maynila Film Festival	2015	Best Actress (tied with Ces Quesada)	Bambanti	Won	
Singkuwento International Film Festival	2016	Best Actress	Ang Mga Alingawngaw Sa Panahon ng Pagpasya	Won	
Society of Filipino Film Reviewers	2021	Best Ensemble Performance	Watch List	Nominated	
Society of Filipino Film Reviewers	2022	Best First Feature	My Amanda	Nominated	
Valladolid Film Festival	2000	Best Actress	Azucena	Nominated	
VP Choice Awards	2021	Movie Actress of the Year	My Amanda	Nominated	
VP Choice Awards	2021	Movie Director of the Year	My Amanda	Nominated	
Young Critics Circle	2001	Best Performance by Male or Female, Adult or Child, Individual or Ensemble in Leading or Supporting Role	Azucena	Nominated	
Young Critics Circle	2016	Best Performance by Male or Female, Adult or Child, Individual or Ensemble in Leading or Supporting Role	Bambanti	Nominated	
