= Boy Yñiguez =

Filipino cinematographer

Roberto "Boy" Yñiguez is a Filipino cinematographer and photographer. He won the Gawad Urian Award for Best Cinematography in 2007 for the film The Bet Collector, as well as the Luna Award for Best Cinematography in 2018 for Ang Larawan.

== Education ==
Yñiguez graduated from the Development Academy of the Philippines.

== Career ==
In 1978, Yñiguez and writer Alfred A. Yuson designed the "Handumanan" yearbook of the University of St. La Salle in Bacolod at the invitation of future filmmaker Peque Gallaga.

By the early 1980s, Yñiguez served as a creative collaborator of filmmaker Kidlat Tahimik for documentary projects commissioned by West German television, among which was the 1981 short film Olympic Gold (later re-edited by Tahimik into the feature-length film Turumba in 1983).

As an artist, Yñiguez is based in Baguio.

== Filmography ==
=== Film ===
Year	Title	Director	Note(s)	Ref(s).
1972	Growth of a Village	Boy Yñiguez	Animated student short film	
1981	Olympic Gold	Kidlat Tahimik	45-minute installment of Vater Unser	
1981	I Am Blushing	Vilgot Sjöman	as first assistant cameraman	
1982	Shaman Wars	Alfred "Kip" Yuson; Boy Yñiguez; Reuben Domingo	Short film	
1983	Turumba	Kidlat Tahimik	Re-edited from Olympic Gold	
1991	Takedera Mon Amour: Diary of a Bamboo Connection	Kidlat Tahimik	as "additional kamera"	
1993	Gaano Kita Kamahal	Butch Perez		
1994	Why Is Yellow the Middle of the Rainbow?	Kidlat Tahimik	as "additional camera" Original title: Bakit Dilaw ang Gitna ng Bahaghari?	
2001	The Last Parian	Peter Chua	Short film	
2001	Tuhog	Jeffrey Jeturian	with Shayne Clemente and Sherman So	
2003	1st Time	Lyle Nemenzo Sacris	with Neil Daza and Robert Quebral	
2006	The Bet Collector	Jeffrey Jeturian	Original title: Kubrador	
2010	Ang Balikbayan: Memories of Overdevelopment 1980–2010	Kidlat Tahimik	Short film Shot from 1978 to 2010	
2010	I Do	Veronica B. Velasco		
2011	Bisperas	Jeffrey Jeturian		
2013	Puti	Miguel "Mike" Alcazaren		
2015	Tragic Theater	Tikoy Aguiluz		
2015	BalikBayan #1: Memories of Overdevelopment, Redux III	Kidlat Tahimik	Shot from 1978 to 2015	
2015	Invisible	Lawrence Fajardo	Original title: Imbisibol	
2017	I'm Drunk, I Love You	JP Habac		
2017	Kita Kita	Sigrid Andrea Bernardo		
2017	Last Night	Joyce Bernal		
2017	Ang Larawan	Loy Arcenas		
2018	Mr. & Mrs. Cruz	Sigrid Andrea Bernardo		
2019	Maledicto	Mark Meily		
2019	UnTrue	Sigrid Andrea Bernardo		
2020	Kintsugi	Lawrence Fajardo		
2021	My Amanda	Alessandra De Rossi		
2023	BalikBayan #1: Memories of Overdevelopment, Redux VII	Kidlat Tahimik	Shot from 1978 to 2023	
2024	Under Parallel Skies	Sigrid Andrea Bernardo		
2024	The Hearing	Lawrence Fajardo		
2025	I'mPerfect	Sigrid Andrea Bernardo		

=== Commercials ===
Year	Title	Client	Creative director	Director	Note(s)	Ref(s).
1988	"Pu-Yi"	Knorr Chinese Soup	Joy Cortez	Boldy Tapales		
1989	"Boom"	San Miguel Beer	Erwin Castillo			
1999	"Parachute"	Johnson's Floor Wax	Irwin Castillo	Jun Reyes		
2004	"Reinforcement"	Sony Television				
2016	"Finding Pia"	BDO	Joel Eudela	Carlo Directo		
