= List of films with the longest production time =

This is a list of films shot or animated over three or more years. This list does not include projects composed of series of films shot over an extended period, except where individual films within those projects meet this criterion.

== List ==
| Film | Release year | Number of years | Notes |
|---|---|---|---|
| 12 | 2003 | 10 | Shooting began in 1993 and was finalized in 2003. The long process of filming was intentional to show the natural aging of the actors. |
| 5-25-77 | 2022 | 18 | Shooting began in summer 2004. Numerous versions of the film have been screened over the years, including a rough cut at Star Wars Celebration IV. It officially premiered in 2017 followed by a limited theatrical release. The film with its final cut was released on November 22, 2022. |
| Aalambana | TBD | 6 | In November 2019, Vaibhav was cast to play the lead role in the film produced by KJR Studios and directed by newcomer Pari K Vijay, who had earlier worked as an assistant in films like Mundasupatti (2014) and Indru Netru Naalai (2015). Munishkanth was chosen to play the role of a genie, and the film was said to be in the fantasy comedy genre. Parvati Nair was cast as the female lead opposite to Vaibhav. Principal photography began with a pooja ceremony on 14 December 2019 in MGR Film City. The film was shot in Mysore Palace, Chennai and Pondicherry, and the shooting was completed in January 2021. |
| The Act of Killing | 2012 | 6 | A documentary about perpetrators of the Indonesian mass killings of 1965–66 which was shot between 2005 and 2011. |
| Aghathiyaa | 2025 | 4 | The project was announced on 2020, but eventually shelved by the production house due to multiple issues, later on 2023, the project was officially taken over by Vels Film International. After 4 years delays, Aghathiyaa was released in theatres on 28 February 2025. |
| Savira Mettilu | 2006 | 38 | The film began production in 1968 by Puttanna Kanagal but was shelved after shooting some scenes and was never completed. Years later, the film was revived by Basava Gowda and it was completed by KSL Swamy interspersing the old scenes with present portions. The film was released in 2006. |
| Amra Ekta Cinema Banabo | 2019 | 9 | Principal photography began in January 2009. Filming was completed in 176 days in over 9 years. Also notable for being the longest non-experimental film ever made. |
| Apocalypse Now | 1979 | 3 | Inspired by Joseph Conrad's novella Heart of Darkness and originally pitched from screenwriter John Milius as a war comedy, the film was made in pre-production in 1975 and then filmed in 1976, completed with an overbudget of $25 million. The film was originally scheduled for an April 7, 1977, release (on director Francis Ford Coppola's birthday), the film was released two years later in 1979 as a work in progress at the Cannes Film Festival, albeit with mixed reception. The film was released in theaters months later, on August 15, 1979. |
| Atlantis: The Lost Empire | 2001 | 5 | The development and beginning of work started in October 1996 when the idea was conceived, finished in January 2001. |
| Avatar: The Way of Water | 2022 | 13 | This film was announced in 2010 after the release of Avatar with writing and visual effects prep work happening simultaneously for seven years. Filming began in 2017 and concluded in 2020. It was one of the films affected by COVID-19. By the time of its December 2022 release, it had been nearly 13 years since production began. |
| Avatar: Fire and Ash | 2025 | 16 | This film was announced in 2010 and was worked on simultaneously with Avatar: The Way of Water. By the time of its December 2025 release, it had been nearly 16 years since production began. |
| Avatar 4 | 2029 | 12 | Filming began during the simultaneous productions of Avatar: The Way of Water and Avatar: Fire and Ash in 2017. In 2019, with about a third of the filming completed, production went on hiatus and is expected to resume sometime in 2026. The film is scheduled to be released in 2029, roughly 12 years after filming began. |
| Ayalaan | 2024 | 5 | Officially announced in 2016, and filming began in June 2018. The film was affected due to financial constraints with the production house and due to the COVID-19 pandemic, before concluding in January 2021, and additional photography took place in November 2022. |
| Bad Taste | 1987 | 4 | Shot primarily on weekends over the course of four years. |
| BalikBayan #1: Memories of Overdevelopment, Redux VII | 2023 | 45 | Philippine National Artist Kidlat Tahimik began shooting in 1978, with the film being released unfinished in 2010, 2015 (Redux III) and 2017 (Redux VI); the final version of the film, subtitled Redux VII, was completed in April 2023. |
| Blood Tea and Red String | 2006 | 13 | A stop-motion film. Director Christiane Cegavske worked primarily alone. |
| The Boy and the Heron | 2023 | 7 | Hayao Miyazaki started working on the film in 2016 whilst working on the CG animated short film Boro the Caterpillar, and planned to have it released by 2019 in time for the Olympics. Due to a slow production, with Miyazaki's age being a factor, the film was pushed back. Despite the setbacks from the COVID-19 pandemic, the film's production allowed more work to be done at a consistent rate. It was released on July 14, 2023. |
| Boyhood | 2014 | 12 | The long production schedule was intentional to show the natural aging of the actors in a story taking place over 12 years. Filming took place once or twice a year, starting in summer 2002 and ending in October 2013. The cast and crew gathered to film scenes for three or four days annually. |
| Brahmāstra: Part One – Shiva | 2022 | 7 | Its pre-production was started in 2014, filming started in February 2018 and ended in March 2022. The film was released in September 2022. |
| Chatô, o Rei do Brasil | 2015 | 20 | Filming began in 1995 for a 1997 release, production was paused and then resumed in 1999 but was later cancelled again. Production completed in 2015. |
| Closer to Home | 1995 | 5 | In the 1990s, this was one of the first American independent feature films to be shot outside the country, both in New York City and abroad (the Philippines). After pre-production in the Philippines began in 1990, shooting was completed in 1992, with reshoots in 1993. 18 months would pass while additional financing was raised to complete filming in New York City. The film was released in August 1995. |
| Coffee and Cigarettes | 2003 | 18 | The first segment was filmed in 1986, while the final six were completed in 2003. |
| Dangerous Men | 2005 | 21 | The film was in production from 1984 to 2005, despite screening of a finished cut in 1985. |
| Dead Souls | 2018 | 13 | Filming began in 2005, with interviews being shot in a continuous period until 2008. Further filming was then suspended due to both Wang Bing becoming ill and then due to becoming committed to other projects. Production restarted in 2014 and continued until 2017. It is also one of the longest films ever made. |
| Dhruva Natchathiram | TBA | 9 | Filming began in January 2017 and went into production hell as the director Gautham Vasudev Menon suffered financial constraints, before completing the film in February 2023. |
| Dhumketu | 2025 | 9 | The filming of the film was completed in 2017, while its production lasted for 9 years due to the producer Rana Sarkar's conflicts with Eastern India Motion Pictures Association. |
| Dimension | 2010 | 7 | Filming took place in three-minute segments from 1991 to 1997. The original plan was to film once a year, from 1991 until 2024, but director Lars von Trier abandoned the project in the late 1990s. The finished footage was released on DVD in 2010. |
| Eraserhead | 1977 | 5 | Due to the minimal length of the script, director David Lynch struggled to finance his debut film. It ultimately took five years to complete filming. |
| Everyday | 2012 | 5 | Filming took place twice a year, once in summer and once in winter. The cast and crew gathered for a few weeks each time, whenever they had gaps in their schedules. |
| The Evil Within | 2017 | 15 | Originally titled The Storyteller, filming began in 2002, with director Andrew Getty constantly starting and stopping the film's production. Getty died in 2015, two years before the film's release with only editing and color correction remaining, leaving editor Michael Luceri to finish the film on his own. |
| Evolution of a Filipino Family | 2004 | 11 | The pre-production was started in December 1993 in Jersey City, and began photography on 8 March 1994 in New Jersey. The Philippine shoot started in early 1997 in Gerona, Tarlac. The shooting ended in April 2003. But more scenes were added October–November 2004, and finally stopped 31 January 2005. It is also one of the longest films ever made. |
| The Fall | 2006 | 4 | Shot in 24 countries. |
| Game Changer | 2025 | 3 | The film was announced in February 2021 with Ram Charan in the lead and S.Shankar as the director in his debut Telugu directorial. Principal photography commenced in October 2021 with a proposed completion in December 2022. However, production was stalled due to Shankar resuming his other long pending project Indian 2 and working simultaneously on both films. The principal photography was eventually completed with the final schedule in July 2024. |
| The Goat Life | 2024 | 16 | Based on the 2008 novel Aadujeevitham by Benyamin, the project was started by director Blessy in 2008 who also produced the film. Prithviraj Sukumaran was cast in the lead role. However, production was stalled due to financial constraints and the film languished in development hell until 2015 when co-producers came on board. Shooting resumed in 2018 and concluded in 2022 over six schedules being disrupted by the COVID-19 pandemic. The film eventually released on 28 March 2024. |
| The Grand Bizarre | 2018 | 5 | Footage was collected in fifteen countries, including Turkey, Greece, Israel, Morocco and Indonesia. |
| Hard to Be a God | 2013 | 6 | Filming took place on and off for a period of six years, beginning in the autumn of 2000 and was followed by an additional six years of post-production. |
| Hari Hara Veera Mallu | 2025 | 5 | The film was officially announced in January 2020 with principal photography commencing in September 2020. The film was predominantly shot in Hyderabad in several legs. The film experienced several delays due to the pandemic and Pawan Kalyan's political commitments. |
| Hell's Angels | 1930 | 3 | A Howard Hughes' World War 1 film, referenced in The Aviator. A long shooting schedule, made longer when Hughes decided to add sound at the advent of "talkies". |
| Hoop Dreams | 1994 | 5 | Filming included over 250 hours of footage. Originally planned to be a 30-minute piece for PBS, Hoop Dreams developed into a 170-minute documentary that took three years to edit. |
| Hum Tumhare Hain Sanam | 2002 | 6 | It took six years to make, with long sabbaticals between shoots due to production problems. |
| Indian 2 | 2024 | 5 | A sequel to director S. Shankar's 1996 film Indian, the story was conceived in 2015 and the project was announced in September 2017. Principal photography commenced in January 2019 but was affected by various factors including an accident on the sets, the COVID-19 pandemic and the filming of Shankar's Game Changer and lead actor Kamal Haasan's Vikram. Filming eventually resumed in August 2022 and concluded in January 2024. The film eventually released on 12 July 2024. |
| Inland Empire | 2006 | 3 | It was completed over three years and shot primarily in Los Angeles and Łódź without a finished screenplay. |
| Inside Out | 2015 | 3 | Development lasted for five and a half years, with three of its duration for the production. |
| It Happened Here | 1964 | 7 | Filmed by Kevin Brownlow and Andrew Mollo, who began work on the film as teenagers, with a cast that mostly consisted of amateur actors. |
| Junk Head | 2017 | 7 | This Japanese stop motion film, which started life as a short, spent seven years in production. It was directed by Takahide Hori, who also sculpted the models, designed the sets, composed the score, wrote the screenplay and provided voice work. The completed film debuted at the Fantasia International Film Festival in Canada on July 23, 2017. After a few film festival tours, Hori re-cut the film and it was given a wide release on March 26, 2021, in Japan. |
| Khrustalyov, My Car! | 1998 | 7 | Production lasted for seven years due to difficulties in financial backing. |
| Kill It and Leave This Town | 2020 | 14 | The film took fourteen years to animate. Wilczyński had originally intended Kill It and Leave This Town to be a short film, however eventually ended up deciding to make it his feature debut. |
| The King and the Mockingbird (Le Roi et l'Oiseau) | 1980 | 33 | Regarded today as a masterpiece of French animation, Le Roi et l'Oiseau begun production in 1948 as La Bergère et le Ramoneur. However, the film suddenly stopped production and was released unfinished by its producer in 1952 without the approval of director Paul Grimault or screenwriter Jacques Prévert. In 1967, Grimault obtained the rights to the film and spent the next decade raising financing to complete the film as originally intended, finally releasing it in 1980. |
| Koyaanisqatsi | 1982 | 7 | The first part in the Qatsi trilogy directed by Godfrey Reggio. Production began in 1975 and ended in 1982. |
| Legend of Destruction | 2021 | 8 | An Israeli animated film where three and a half years were spent with concept development, initial sketches and storyboarding, followed by four and a half years of producing the illustrations. |
| Letters Home | 2023 | 25 | Newly arrived with his family in a small Midwestern town, a smart but hopelessly awkward boy despairs that he will never truly fit in. Yet as the years pass, he realizes that his adopted hometown has become more a part of his identity than he ever dreamed possible. |
| Mad God | 2021 | 30 | A stop-motion animated film by Phil Tippett, production was shelved for 20 years before resuming in 2013. |
| Marketa Lazarová | 1967 | 3 | Works started in 1960 and finished in 1967, with filming taking place over 548 days from 1964 to 1966. |
| Marwencol | 2010 | 4 | A documentary film initially planned to be shot over a single weekend, the director ultimately took four years to complete it. |
| Merrily We Roll Along | TBD | 20 | Having previously directed Boyhood, Richard Linklater decided to shoot this film on again off again for a span of 20 years. Filming began in 2019 and is expected to be finished around 2039. |
| Meru | 2015 | 3 | The first portion took place in 2008, while the final portion was shot in 2011. |
| Microcosmos | 1996 | 3 | Nature documentary that took 15 years of research, 2 years of equipment design and 3 years of shooting. |
| Movie 43 | 2013 | 4 | Filming spanned four years in order to work around the ensemble cast members' schedules. |
| Naam | 2024 | 20 | Filming of Naam, starring Ajay Devgn started in 2004 and was ready to be released in 2005, however, the film faced numerous delays, one if them being the film producer's death, thus was in development hell. In 2024, the film gained new producer Anil Roongta and got released in November 2024. |
| Niu Lai | 2026 | 5 | Production on the film, handled by a mother and son, took over five years began in 2021 and concluded in 2026. |
| No Other Land | 2024 | 4 | The documentary was filmed over four years between 2019 and 2023. |
| On the Silver Globe | 1988 | 12 | After production was shut down by the Polish cultural authorities in 1977, the film's director, Andrzej Żuławski, returned to Poland in 1988 and smuggled out the remnants of the film to the Cannes Film Festival where it was screened for the first time. The missing segments of the film were filled in with shots of modern-day Warsaw while Zulawski's voice-over explained which segments were missing. |
| On-Gaku: Our Sound | 2019 | 7 | Directed and mostly animated by Kenji Iwaisawa, who worked on the film for over seven years. |
| Othello | 1951 | 3 | An adaptation of the Shakespeare play directed by Orson Welles. The total production time stretched from 1948 to 1952. Welles also produced Filming Othello, a documentary about the making from 1974 to 1978. |
| The Other Side of the Wind | 2018 | 48 | Principal photography began in 1970 and concluded in 1976. After four decades of difficulties that interfered with the editorial and post-production processes, the film was finally finished in early 2018 and was released in November of that same year. |
| The Overcoat | TBD | 45 | An adaptation of the short story written by Nikolai Gogol, directed by Yuri Norstein. Began production in 1981. Still in production as of 2026. |
| Pakeezah | 1972 | 16 | Filming began in 1956 and continued until 1964 when lead actress Meena Kumari separated from the director, Kamal Amrohi, her husband. The film was put on hold for five years until fellow actors Nargis and Sunil Dutt convinced Kumari to finish it in 1969. |
| The Primevals | 2023 | 29 | Filmed in 1994, production restarted in 2018. |
| Roar | 1981 | 5 | Directed by Noel Marshall, the film's production was constantly delayed after numerous accidents arose, such as a flood from a dam that burst three years into filming, which destroyed equipment and the ranch built for the film. Principal photography took place over five years. |
| Radhe Shyam | 2022 | 4 | Filming commenced in September 2018 but faced several delays due to the COVID-19 pandemic. Filming was eventually completed in July 2021 and the film released on 11 March 2022. |
| Redline | 2009 | 7 | Animated over seven years using 100,000 hand-made drawings. |
| RRR | 2022 | 4 | Directed by SS Rajamouli, Its pre-production was started in 2018 by announcing cast, it was released in 2022 |
| Samsara | 2011 | 4 | Filmed on location in 25 countries. |
| Shoah | 1985 | 11 | The first six years were devoted to recording interviews conducted in 14 countries. |
| Sleeping Beauty | 1959 | 7 | Disney animated film; production spanned from 1952 when the full storyboard was complete to 1958 when the animation was finished. |
| The Slow Business of Going | 2000 | 5 | Shot one scene at a time over a period of five years in hotel rooms and other locations in various countries. The script was constantly evolving and there was just one consistent cast member, with various other actors appearing in each scene. |
| Songs from the Second Floor | 2000 | 4 | Shot over four years in Sweden. |
| Steamboy | 2004 | 10 | Directed by Katsuhiro Otomo, the film was in production for ten years and utilized more than 180,000 drawings and 440 CG cuts. |
| Tiefland | 1954 | 4 | Script work began in 1934, shooting lasted from 1940 to 1944, and the film was finally shown in 1954. |
| The Tale of the Princess Kaguya | 2013 | 5 | It was announced that Isao Takahata had begun work on the film in 2008 and completed in 2013. This was Takahata's final film, having died in 2018. |
| The Thief and the Cobbler | 1993 | 29 | Work began in 1964. The film was released in an unfinished state in 1993. |
| To the Moon | TBA | 7 | An animated film adaptation of an indie game To the Moon was announced and began development in 2018, with the film being partially scripted and supervised by Kan Gao with Japanese animation companies leading production and Chinese company Ultron Event Horizon funding the film as a collaborative project. As of 2025, no further updates about the film's development, although Gao appears the development going well. |
| The Tragedy of Man | 2011 | 23 | The film went into production in 1988 but encountered difficulties as the production model for Hungarian cinema changed. |
| Train Station | 2017 | 5 | Filmed in 25 countries, 40 filmmakers collaboratively wrote and shot over a period of five years. |
| Tumbbad | 2018 | 6 | The director, Rahi Anil Barve, began writing the script based on a story a friend had told him about in 1993, by the Marathi writer Narayan Dharap. He wrote the first draft in 1997, when he was 18 years old. From 2009 to 2010, he created a 700-page storyboard for the film. It was optioned by seven production companies who backed out and went on the floors (went into production) three times. It was first shot in 2012 but after editing, Barve and Shah were not satisfied. The film was then re-written and re-shot with filming completed in May 2015. Pankaj Kumar served as the director of photography while Sanyukta Kaza was its editor. Jesper Kyd composed the original score while Ajay–Atul composed one song. |
| Udhaya | 2004 | 5 | Filming began in November 1998 and was completed only in January 2004, with many prolonged delays, which lead the lead actor, Vijay appear in many looks and getups throughout the movie. The film was eventually released on 26 March 2004, a month before Vijay's release of another blockbuster Ghilli. |
| Upin & Ipin: The Lone Gibbon Kris | 2019 | 5 | Production started in 2013, Set Completed in 2019. |
| Vishwaroopam II | 2018 | 5 | The sequel to the 2013 film Vishwaroopam, shooting commenced in June 2013 and was stuck in production hell due to the financial problems of producer Venu Ravichandran. Principal photography resumed in October 2016 after lead actor Kamal Haasan took over the production and eventually completed in November 2017. The film released on 10 August 2018. |
| Voyage of Time | 2016 | 13 | Although the actual production for this documentary began in 2003, Terrence Malick has been filming footage since the 1970s and the film features scenes that were filmed in the 1970s, such as the scene featuring Aboriginal Australians. |
| The Way of the Wind | TBA | 7 | |
| Where the Dead Go to Die | 2011 | 3 | Director, animator, writer and composer Jimmy ScreamerClauz would stop animating the adult animated horror film for months at a time, before starting again. |
| Why Has Bodhi-Dharma Left for the East? | 1989 | 7 | Bae Yong-kyun, a professor at Dongguk University in Seoul, spent seven years making this film with one camera and editing it by hand. |
| Why Is Yellow the Middle of the Rainbow? | 1994 | 13 | Kidlat Tahimik began filming in 1981. |
| Wildwood | 2026 | 14 | Development began in September 2011, weeks after the release of the novel, when Laika announced plans to adapt Wildwood as a stop-motion animated feature film, although it continued working on several films and the film was yet to be confirmed until a decade later when the production was officially confirmed. |
| Winged Migration | 2001 | 3 | The documentary was shot over the course of three years focusing on hundreds of bird species. |
| Youth (Spring) | 2023 | 5 | Wang Bing shot the film between 2014 and 2019, followed by a four-year post-production process. |
| Zack Snyder's Justice League | 2021 | 5 | The principal photography for the movie began in October 2016. After director Zack Snyder faced a family tragedy and creative differences between him and the studio, he left the project. Following his departure, some of the footage, albeit heavily modified in post-production, had been used alongside newly shot scenes from a drastically different script in the 2017 movie Justice League. Following a multi-year fan campaign for the release of the original film, the movie was completed according to original plans and released to the public in March 2021. |
| Zsazsa Zaturnnah vs. the Amazonistas of Planet X | 2026 | 7 | The film was announced in June 2019 with Zaturnnah's creator, Carlo Vergara, himself penned the screenplay after he wrote a spec script to fit the story in an animated feature. In 2024, the film worked for almost 4 years of development to finish but need to raise additional $40,000 (₱2.3 million) to finish the film within two years through Kickstarter campaign. |

== See also ==
- Development hell
- National Film Registry
- List of longest films
