= Cegavske =

Cegavske is a surname. Notable people with the surname include:

- Barbara Cegavske (born 1951), American businesswoman and politician
- Christiane Cegavske (born 1971), American artist and stop motion animator
