= Blood Tea and Red String =

- DVD cover
- Directed by: Christiane Cegavske
- Written by: Christiane Cegavske
- Produced by: Christiane Cegavske
- Starring: Christiane Cegavske
- Music by: Mark Growden
- Production company: Christiane Cegavske Productions
- Distributed by: Cinema Epoch
- Release date: February 2, 2006
- Running time: 71 minutes
- Country: United States
- Language: English

Blood Tea and Red String is a 2006 American stop-motion-animated fantasy film, written, directed, and animated by Christiane Cegavske, who described it as a "fairy tale for adults". It was released on February 2, 2006, after a production time of 13 years, having been filmed in various places in the West Coast and in two studios. The musical score was composed and performed by Mark Growden.

== Plot ==
The tale centers on the struggle between the aristocratic White Mice and the rustic Creatures Who Dwell Under the Oak, which resemble bats with beaks and chirp like birds, over the doll of their heart's desire. The Mice commission the Oak Dwellers to create a beautiful doll for them. When she is complete, the Creatures fall in love with her and refuse to give her up. The Creatures find an egg floating down the stream which they place within the doll, which they idolize by hanging above the door of their home. Resorting to thievery, the Mice abscond with her in the middle of the night. The Creatures Who Dwell Under the Oak journey through the mystical land to reclaim their love.

Arriving home with the doll, the mice descend into debauchery as they become drunk on blood tea. However, the egg within the doll hatches, destroying its torso. A creature with a head and face resembling the doll with the body of a blue bird emerges and escapes. After being caught in a spider's web and presumably dying, the bird is reclaimed by The Creatures Who Dwell Under the Oak, who place the bird's body within a pouch made of two leaves.

One of the mice absconds with the doll, tying the bird's blue feathers to the doll with red string. The mouse returns the doll to its place above the Oak. The other mice arrive and a fight ensues between the mice and the Creatures. The doll is tugged from all directions and destroyed. The Creatures give the doll's parts to the mouse, then release the body of the bird down the stream.

== Cast ==
- Christiane Cegavske as Human (credited as Little Miss Crow)
- Linda Hagood as Flower Voices

== Reception ==
=== Critical response ===
On review aggregator website Rotten Tomatoes the film has an approval rating of 92% based on 12 critics, with an average rating of 7.8/10. Metacritic assigned the film a weighted average score of 73 out of 100, based on 6 critics, indicating "generally favourable reviews". ScreenRant reported Blood Tea and Red String to be one of the highest ranking stop-motion films on Letterboxd, and TheCinemaholic listed it as one of the best stop-motion films of all time. Taste of Cinema and Collider also ranked it, respectively, among the best surrealist or silent films of the 21st century.

Brett D. Rogers of Frames Per Second magazine praised the film, calling it "exquisitely realized ... an antidote to modern digital precision and diluted creativity" and highlighting Mark Growden's score as suiting the film perfectly, "[w]rapping Blood Tea's intricate scenery and its characters' wordless dialect in a lingering, haunting layer of spectral sound." Harvard's Deirdre Barrett reviewed the film positively, saying that "'Each man kills the thing he loves' seems to be message of the film," she wrote, "Mice, rats and spider compete for a doll and her exotic child with tragic consequences... The whole film had a dream or storybook feel. But it is the childhood nightmare or the fairy tales of the Brothers Grimm. Its magic serves sudden, violent death as often as love or beauty. Its a tale with childhood’s imagery but not a tale for children.”

R. Emmet Sweeney of The Village Voice called the film "a genuine piece of outsider art". Dennis Harvey of Variety called it an "enigmatic, dialogue-free fairy tale" and "a David Lynchean fever dream on Beatrix Potter terrain," but cautioned that "few will think [it is] suitable for children".

== Release ==
On November 7, 2006, Blood Tea and Red String was released on DVD by Koch Vision, a division of Entertainment One.

== Bibliography ==
- Gonzalez, Ed (September 18, 2006). "Review: Blood Tea and Red String". Slant Magazine.
- Lee, Nathan (October 6, 2006). "A Dark Tale of White Mice, Sylvan Creatures and a Stolen Goddess". The New York Times.

== See also ==
- List of animated feature-length films
- List of stop-motion films
- Adult animation
- List of films shot over three or more years
- Arthouse animation
