= Perfumed Nightmare =

1977 film by Kidlat Tahimik

- Mababangong Bangungot
- Directed by: Kidlat Tahimik
- Written by: Kidlat Tahimik
- Produced by: Kidlat Tahimik
- Starring: Kidlat Tahimik
- Cinematography: Hartmut Lerch; Kidlat Tahimik
- Edited by: Kidlat Tahimik
- Music by: Hanns Christian Müller
- Production company: Kidlat Kulog Productions
- Distributed by: Zoetrope Studios (US)
- Release date: 1977
- Running time: 94 minutes
- Country: Philippines
- Languages: English; Filipino; French; German

Perfumed Nightmare (Tagalog: Mababangong Bangungot), a 1977 Filipino comedy-drama, is the story of a young Filipino jeepney driver from Barangay Balian, Laguna infatuated with the ideas of space travel and the West, who gradually becomes disillusioned after living in Paris. Kidlat Tahimik produced, wrote, directed, edited, co-shot, and acted in it.

== Plot ==
Kidlat, a jeepney driver in a village in the Philippines, dreams of becoming an astronaut and making it big in the United States. His dreams take him as far as Europe and to a series of events that will show him that his idealisation of what Western and European culture has to offer is far from real.

== Reception ==
Perfumed Nightmare was well-received by critics upon release, earning the International Critics Award (FIPRESCI) at the Berlin Film Festival.

It is also the Filipino film that received the most votes in the British Film Institute's 2022 Sight and Sound Greatest Films of All Time poll (joint critics and directors' list), with Kidlat Tahimik being the second most voted Filipino director. With that, it is now also considered the greatest Filipino comedy film.

In NASA / TREK: Popular Science and Sex in America (1997), Constance Penley cites the hero's efforts to energize "the kids in his destitute Philippine village by getting them to band together in a Wernher von Braun fan club (with all irony about the kids’ adulation for a Nazi turned NASA scientist intended).

== Cast ==
- Kidlat Tahimik as Kidlat
