= I Do (2010 film) =

- Theatrical movie poster
- Directed by: Veronica B. Velasco
- Written by: Veronica B. Velasco; Jinky Laurel
- Produced by: Elma S. Medua
- Starring: Erich Gonzales; Enchong Dee
- Cinematography: Boy Yñiguez
- Edited by: Vanessa Ubas de Leon
- Music by: Jessie Lasaten
- Production company: Star Cinema
- Distributed by: Star Cinema
- Release date: September 29, 2010 (Philippines)
- Country: Philippines
- Languages: Filipino; Mandarin Chinese
- Box office: ₱44 million

I Do is a 2010 Filipino romantic comedy film co-written and directed by Veronica Velasco. The film stars Enchong Dee and Erich Gonzales.

Produced and distributed by ABS-CBN Film Productions, the film was released in the Philippines on September 29, 2010.

== Plot ==
Mayumi (Erich Gonzales) is a girl with a happy disposition in life who dreams of meeting her "the one" someday. She has been dreaming of meeting her "the one" and having the perfect wedding ever since she was a little girl. When she meets Lance (Enchong Dee), a Chinese descendant, in a wedding, she immediately knows that he is "the one" she is waiting for, her faith and destiny. The two of them become lovers despite the unwillingness of their families to their relationship.

The unsupportiveness of Lance's family was shown during a birthday party, where Mayumi wore a blue dress while everyone else in the party wore red. (During celebrations, it is customary for the Chinese to wear red attires.) Lance's family talked about how she was very different in front of her in Chinese. They also tell Lance about how inappropriate his companion is.

One day, Mayumi tells her friends about her current condition, about how she recently seems to be very choosy of what to eat and also how she always feels like urinating. Her friends immediately accompany her to the drugstore, thinking of the possibility that she might be pregnant. Turns out, Mayumi is pregnant. Her family, especially her father, is very disappointed of her and tells her to move out. Mayumi temporarily lives in Lance's house. She is forced to marry Lance. Although Mayumi loves the idea of becoming Lance's bride, Lance on the other hand has doubts on Mayumi becoming his wife. He doesn't have enough money for the extravagant wedding that Mayumi wants, since his family is not very supportive on the idea of him marrying a Filipino and also because the baby is not a boy. Being Chinese, Lance is obliged to marry also a girl of Chinese descent to keep the Chinese blood tradition. Mayumi's family on the other hand felt they were betrayed because Lance promised to marry Mayumi because of their love child. Is marrying someone because of a baby worthy of saying "I do"?

== Cast ==
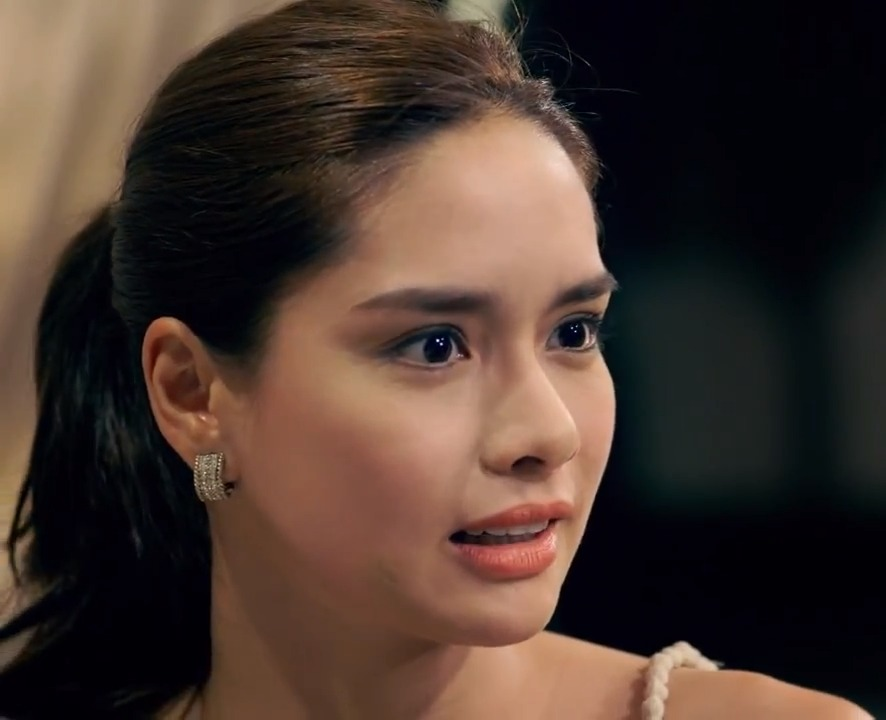
Erich Gonzales portrays Mayumi "Yumi" Punongbayan-Tan.

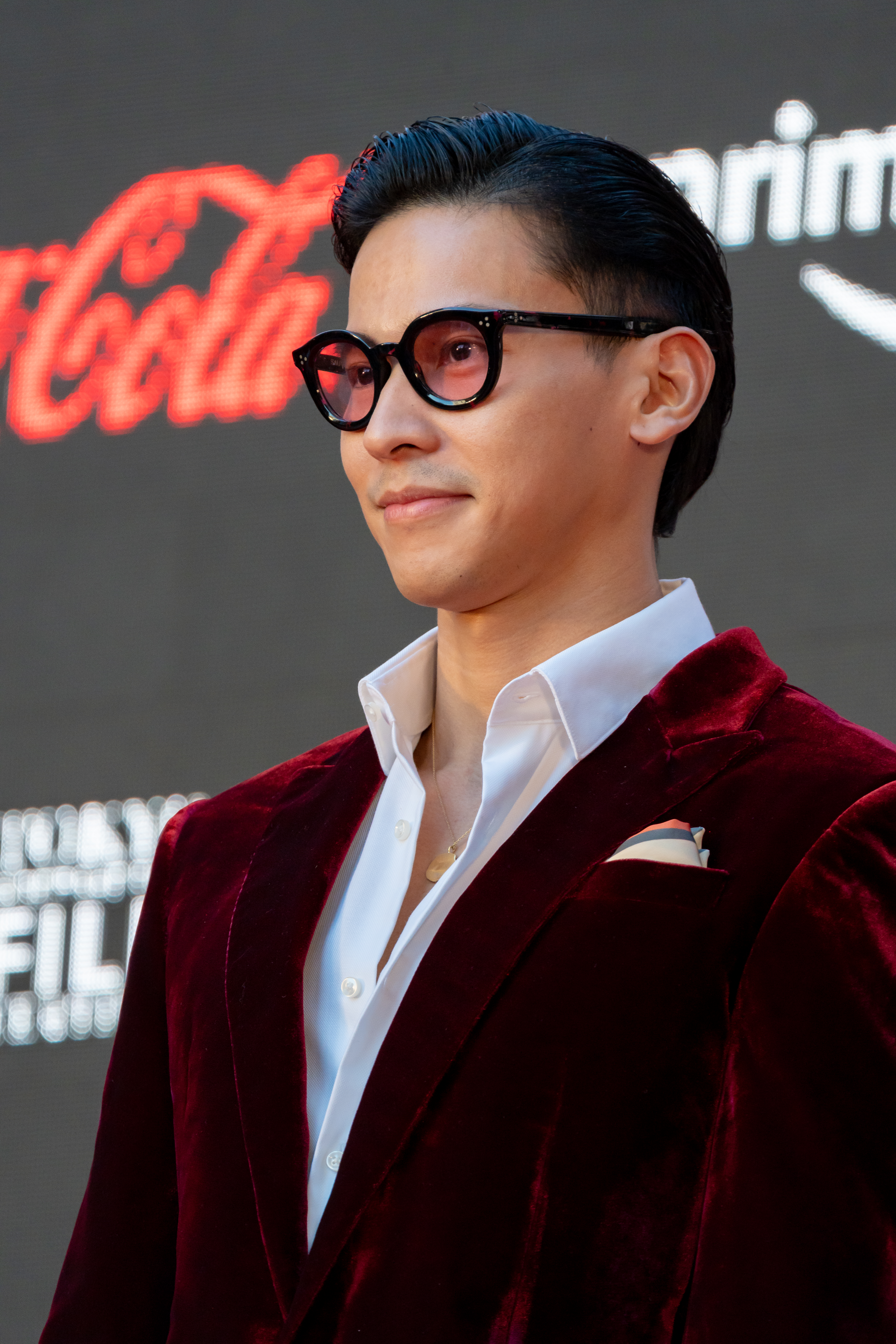
Enchong Dee portrays Lance Anderson "Lance" Tan.

- Erich Gonzales as Mayumi "Yumi" Punongbayan-Tan
- Enchong Dee as Lance Anderson "Lance" Tan
  - John Manalo as young Lance Anderson "Lance Tan
- Dennis Padilla as Caloy Punongbayan
- Janus Del Prado as Bernard
- Nash Aguas as Dakila Punongbayan
- Pokwang as Nenita Punongbayan
- Melai Cantiveros as Marian
- Jun Urbano as Angkong
- Ricardo Cepeda as Edison Tan
  - Joem Bascon as young Edison Tan
- Isay Alvarez as Vivian Tan
  - Katya Santos as young Vivian Tan
- Eliza Pineda as Sharleen Tan
  - Barbie Sabino as young Sharleen Tan
- Alwyn Uytingco as Alemberg
- Jane Oineza as Awit
- Allyzon Lualhati as April
- Che Ramos as Mildred Tan
- Joyce So as Shiela
- Empoy Marquez as counselor
- Ruby Ruiz as Tita Baby
- Carmelita Sanchez as Tita Luding
- Nick Olanka as Tito Joey
- Temi Abad as Tito Mel
- Annabelle Serraon as Tita Tita
- Erlito Reyes as Tito Jhun
- Olympia Velasco as Tita Tersing
- Menggie Cobarrubias as Tony Boy
- Roden Araneta as Mang Bob
- Joey Paras as clerk
- Jerico Antonio as Olan
- Micaela Tuazon as Sofia

== Production ==
Under director Veronica Velasco, RC Delos Reyes served as a production associate.

== Reception ==
=== International screenings ===
The film had international screenings on October 1, 2010, in select cities in the United States such as Las Vegas, Nevada, San Francisco, Los Angeles, San Diego, Milpitas (all in California), Seattle, Washington, Bergenfield, New Jersey and Chicago, Illinois. It will also have screenings in Guam.

=== Soundtrack ===
The official theme song is titled "Kahit Habang Buhay", which is sung by Yeng Constantino and Sam Milby. Another song that was played during the film is titled "Kasama", which is sung by Aiza Seguerra.
