= Turumba =

1983 film by Kidlat Tahimik

- Official movie poster
- Directed by: Kidlat Tahimik
- Written by: Kidlat Tahimik
- Produced by: Kidlat Tahimik
- Starring: Homer Abiad; Iñigo Vito; Maria Pehipol; Patricio Abari; Bernarda Pacheco
- Cinematography: Roberto Yniguez
- Edited by: K.H. Fugunt
- Music by: Mandy Afuang
- Production companies: Kidlat-Kulog Productions; Tellux Film
- Distributed by: Flower Films
- Release date: 1983
- Running time: 87 minutes
- Countries: Philippines; West Germany
- Language: Filipino

Turumba is a 1983 Filipino independent film written, produced, and directed by Kidlat Tahimik. The film was originally made as a 45-minute short film titled Olympic Gold, commissioned by West German broadcaster ZDF for the 1981 television series Vater Unser.

== Synopsis ==
Set in a tiny village, the story follows a family who makes papier-mache animals which they sell during the Turumba festival. One day, a German visitor decides to buy all their wooden sculptures and orders a whole stock in celebration of the German Oktoberfest. Soon enough, the family and their entire village have turned into a year-round cycle of profit-driven labour, resulting in the dissolution of their old tradition.

== Cast ==
- Homer Abiad as Kadu
- Iñigo Vito as Romy
- Maria Pehipol as Lola
- Patricio Abari as Mang Pati
- Bernarda Pacheco as Bernarda
- Katrin de Guia as Katrin Luise
- Claudia Aderes as Mother
- Johnny Ching as Son

== Release ==
Turumba was given a limited release in the United States by documentarian Les Blank's Flower Films on April 11, 1984.
