= My Amanda =

2021 film by Alessandra de Rossi

- Promotional poster
- Directed by: Alessandra de Rossi
- Written by: Alessandra de Rossi
- Produced by: Joyce Bernal; Piolo Pascual; Erickson Raymundo; E del Mundo; Alessandra de Rossi; Assunta de Rossi; Jules Ledesma
- Starring: Alessandra de Rossi; Piolo Pascual
- Cinematography: Boy Yñiguez
- Music by: Kettle Mata
- Production companies: Spring Films; AWOO
- Distributed by: Netflix
- Release date: July 15, 2021
- Running time: 89 minutes
- Country: Philippines
- Language: Filipino

My Amanda is a 2021 Philippine romantic drama film directed and written by Alessandra de Rossi in her directorial debut produced under Spring Films and AWOO. It stars de Rossi and Piolo Pascual.

== Plot ==
The film revolves around TJ "Fuffy" and Amanda "Fream" who are unusually close friends who are often mistaken as a couple.

== Cast ==
- Alessandra de Rossi as Amanda "Fream"

De Rossi played the role of Amanda. She also had to simultaneously fulfill the role of director and writer which she remarked as "draining".

- Piolo Pascual as TJ "Fuffy"

The character was based on a composite of De Rossi's male friends in real life. De Rossi herself cast Piolo Pascual as TJ, due to the actor's sense of humor. De Rossi, in jest, added that Pascual funnier than her Kita Kita co-star Empoy Marquez. Pascual remarked that his character is the same as him in real life. He had to grow his hair long and wear piercing for the role. Since TJ is largely based on De Rossi's friend in real life, TJ was brought in for the film so that Pascual could mimic the mannerisms of de Rossi's friends.

The cast of My Amanda also includes Luz Valdez, KC Montero, and Helga Krapf. Piolo Pascual remarked that his character is the same as him in real life, save for his character's long hair and piercings.

== Production ==
My Amanda marks as the directorial and writing debut for lead actress Alessandra de Rossi. The film was produced under Spring Films, a production film of cast member Piolo Pascual, and AWOOO (A World of Our Own). The film which took three years to complete, also had Joyce Bernal as its creative producer and Boy Yñiguez as its cinematographer. Other members of the production team include Marilen Magsaysay (colorist), Kettle Mata (composer), and Hector Calma (assistant director). Principal photography for My Amanda lasted 10 to 11 days.

De Rossi in coming up for the concept for the film, intended to share a "share a different kind of love story" – she wanted My Amanda to portray a friendship that is "intimate and not superficial, rare and sincere". Chaka Khan's "Through the Fire" was used as the film's theme song.

== Release ==
My Amanda was first released globally through the online streaming platform Netflix on July 15, 2021.

== Reception ==
The film became the top 2 trending film in Netflix Philippines, two days from its initial release.
