= The Bet Collector =

2006 drama film by Jeffrey Jeturian

- Promotional poster
- Directed by: Jeffrey Jeturian
- Written by: Ralston Jover
- Produced by: Atty. Josabeth V. Alonso
- Starring: Gina Pareño
- Cinematography: Roberto Yñiguez
- Edited by: Jay Halili
- Music by: Jerrold Tarog
- Production company: MLR Films
- Distributed by: Global Film Initiative
- Release dates: September 8, 2006 (TIFF); November 3, 2006 (Philippines)
- Running time: 98 minutes
- Country: Philippines
- Language: Filipino

The Bet Collector (Filipino: Kubrador, stylized KUBRADOЯ) is a 2006 Filipino drama film directed by Jeffrey Jeturian and written by Ralston Jover, with Armando Lao as screenplay supervisor. Starring Gina Pareño, the story follows an aging bet collector whose mundane existence is suddenly transformed by an unforeseen series of events and jueteng, the game of numbers dating back to the country's Spanish colonial period.

Produced by MLR Films, the film premiered in Canada on September 8, 2006, as part of the 31st Toronto International Film Festival. It received a Philippine release on November 3.

== Plot ==
An ordinary, meaningless existence can suddenly be challenged by the perplexing game of life, luck, and death.

Amelita, nicknamed Amy, is an aging jueteng kubrador (bet collector). Despite the regular crackdown on the illegal numbers game, she clings to the job she has known for more than 20 years. She walks around the poverty-stricken squatter's neighborhood collecting bets from her regular patrons every day. Her husband Eli, who is equally aging, can only manage to help by manning their small sari-sari (variety store). Amy's grown-up children have all left home. Her eldest daughter, Mona, works as a domestic helper abroad. Her second daughter, Juvy, who is always pregnant, lives with her in-laws. Amy's youngest son, Eric, a young soldier, recently died on combat duty in Mindanao.

While collecting bets three days before All Saints' Day, Amy is apprehended by a police officer. She joins the other kubradors in the police station until their kabo (handler) bails them out.

The following morning, Amy returns to the streets and continues her clandestine activity. She meets the parish priest, who informs her of a young neighbor's sudden death from an accident. The priest asks her to collect abuloy (donations) from neighbors and friends.

When Amy remits her afternoon jueteng collection to her kabo, she finds him sick at home. He then asks her to attend the next jueteng draw on his behalf, Amy being a trusted ally of the jueteng network for a long time.

Amy and the other kabos await the arrival of the table manager (supervisor) of the draw in a secluded location. But when the table manager arrives, he announces that the draw is cancelled and informs everyone of the winning numbers from the jueteng financier.

When Amy goes home that night, her husband Eli tells her the bad news. He failed to hand over a bet from a neighbor whose numbers, to Amy's surprise, won the rigged draw. Pissed off, she has no choice but to go to her kabo and borrow money to pay the neighbor. That night, the neighbors had lit candles in front of their houses to welcome the feast of All Saints' Day the next morning.

A mammoth crowd greets Amy and her family as they approach the cemetery. At Eric's grave, they saw Glenda, Eric's girlfriend, offering flowers and prayers for her dead boyfriend. Still pissed off with Eli, Amy leaves and wanders around the cemetery to cool off. Suddenly, she hears a commotion. Two vehicles were involved in a collision. The two drivers engage in a heated argument until one of them pulls out a gun and fires a shot. The bullet goes past Amy and hits a teenage boy behind her. Amy shouts for help. Police arrive and arrest the suspect. Other bystanders help load the bloodied body of the boy into a vehicle. Still in a state of shock, Amy follows the gaze as the vehicle speeds away from the crime scene.

== Cast ==
- Gina Pareño as Amy
- Fonz Deza as Eli
- Nanding Josef as Father Buboy
- Teresa Jamias as Juvy
- Ran Del Rosario as Eric
- Soliman Cruz as the Chief of Police
- Johnny Manahan as Mang Poldo
- Domingo Landicho as Tatay Nick
- Nico Antonio as Baste

== Accolades ==
- Cinemanila International Film Festival
  - LINO BROCKA AWARD (Grand Prize)
- 28th Moscow International Film Festival 2006
  - FIPRESCI (International Critic's Award)
- Brisbane International Film Festival 2007
  - NETPAC Award
- Osian's Cinefan Festival of Asian and Arab Cinema
  - FIPRESCI (International Critic's Award)
  - Best Actress for Gina Pareño
  - Best Film
- 2007 Bangkok International Film Festival
  - Nominee - Best ASEAN film
- 2007 Gawad Urian
  - Best Film
  - Best Director - Jeffrey Jeturian
  - Best Actress - Gina Pareño
  - Best Cinematography - Roberto Yñiguez
  - Best Production Design - Leo Abaya
- 2010 Gawad Urian
  - Best Filipino Film of the Decade
