= Through Night and Day =

2018 film by Veronica Velasco

- Isabela
- Directed by: Veronica Velasco
- Written by: Isabela
- Screenplay by: Alessandra de Rossi; Noreen Capili
- Story by: Alessandra de Rossi; Noreen Capili
- Produced by: Vincent del Rosario III; Valerie del Rosario; Veronique del Rosario-Corpus
- Starring: Alessandra de Rossi; Paolo Contis
- Cinematography: Noel Teehankee
- Edited by: Noah Tonga
- Music by: Jessie Lasaten
- Production companies: Viva Films; OctoArts Films; Mischief Productions; Mavx Productions
- Distributed by: Viva Films
- Release date: November 14, 2018
- Running time: 100 minutes
- Country: Philippines
- Language: Filipino

Through Night and Day is a 2018 Philippine romantic comedy-drama film directed by Veronica Velasco starring Alessandra de Rossi and Paolo Contis. The film revolves around an engaged couple whose relationship is tested while on a prenup trip to Iceland.

== Cast ==
- Alessandra de Rossi as Jen; When de Rossi was conceptualizing the story for Through Night and Day, she envisioned a character for Jen that is similar to her own personality. However, when de Rossi gave the scriptwriter role to Noreen Capili, the story remained essentially the same except for Jen's character whose personality shifted to match that of Capili more.
- Paolo Contis as Ben; Contis' role as Ben is his first ever lead role in a film. He also worked with another film released within the same year as Through Night and Day, Ang Pangarap Kong Holdap Contis was not the first choice actor for the role with De Rossi intended her Kita Kita co-star Empoy Marquez to play the role which influenced the decision to make Ben and Jen as childhood friends. De Rossi conceded that Contis portrayal ended as "perfect".

Ben and Jen have known each other for 20 years and have been in a romantic relationship for 13 years prior to becoming engaged.

== Production ==
Through Night and Day was directed by Veronica Velasco and written by Noreen Capili. Lead actress de Rossi was supposed to direct and write the script for the film. De Rossi had a "complete story" for the film but due to pressures on fulfilling the lead actress role for the film, she entrusted Noreen Capili to complete the script and decided to direct the film instead. The final script was said by de Rossi to be "100 times better" than what she could have done. De Rossi personally went to Iceland in June 2018 to develop the story for the film and it was snowing heavily during her stay in the country. Her acting commitment with Since I Found You also held her back from working on the film's story and only managed to create ten sequences before handing over the writing role to Capili.

De Rossi dropped plans on being the film's director. If the plan pushed through Through Night and Day would have marked de Rossi's directoral debut. Veronica Velasco selected to direct the film. Velasco gave the leads, Alessandra de Rossi and Contis creative freedom in delivering their lines and did not oblige them to strictly follow the script.

A significant part of Through Night and Day was filmed in Iceland with principal photography done in the country within a span of nine days. In an accident scene, the temperature went down at around −10 °C (14 °F) in the filming location. An entire day was also wasted due to unforeseen heavy rainfall. Seven days were spent by the crew touring around country through the Ring Road. Iceland is also de Rossi's "dream destination" which is also associated with pop singer and her idol Björk.

The title for the film, Through Night and Day was derived from the lyrics of Eric Clapton's "Tears in Heaven".

== Music ==
Eric Clapton's "Tears in Heaven" was supposed to be the theme song for Through Night and Day. The record label for the song allowed the work to be used for the film but Clapton himself did not give consent due to the song being "very personal" for him. Due to inability to secure rights for "Tears in Heaven", the Stephen Curtis Chapman song "I Will Be Here" was used instead. Ben's proposal song to Jen was composed by Joey Marquez.

== Release ==
Through Night and Day premiered in cinemas in the Philippines on November 14, 2018. The film had a poor opening day reportedly grossing ₱600 thousand. The film received an 'A' rating from the Cinema Evaluation Board.

The film was also released on Netflix on July 9, 2020 where it had relative success, peaking at the number 1 spot as the most viewed film in the Philippines.
