= FPS Magazine =

Canadian magazine specializing in animation

- Categories: Animation, film, television
- Founder: Emru Townsend
- Founded: 1991
- Final issue: 2010
- Country: Canada
- Based in: Montreal
- Language: English
- Website: fpsmagazine.com

FPS Magazine or fps magazine or Frames Per Second Magazine was a magazine specializing in animation, with reviews of animated films and other articles of interest to animation fans.

== History and profile ==
fps was founded as a print magazine in 1991 by Montreal-based animation and technology writer Emru Townsend. The last print issue was released in December 1999. fps became a web-based publication on 22 February 2003, turing a blog, podcasts and PDF issues of the magazine. fps ceased active publication in 2010 following the death of Emru Townsend from leukemia.

fps featured a distinguished group of contributors, including filmmakers J.Walt Adamczyk, Charlie Bonifacio, Armen Boudjikanian, Mike Caputo, and Marc Elias; Michael A. Ventrella, founder of Animato! magazine, writers Brett D. Rogers and Fred Patten, author Carl Gustav Horn, academic Marc Hairston, and Tamu Townsend, writer and sister of publisher Emru Townsend.

== Reception ==
- Animation Insider praised the regular writing cast. They state that "the magazine is packed to the gills with interesting feature articles and product reviews that appeal to your average, or not so average, animation fan."
