= Why Is Yellow the Middle of the Rainbow? =

1994 Filipino film by Kidlat Tahimik

- Japanese-language release poster
- Directed by: Kidlat Tahimik
- Written by: Kidlat Tahimik; Kidlat Gottlieb Kalayaan; Kawayan Thor Kalayaan; Kabunian Cedric Enrique
- Cinematography: Kidlat Tahimik
- Edited by: Kidlat Tahimik; Maureen Gosling (First Assembly)
- Production company: Third World Projector
- Release date: 1994
- Running time: 175 minutes
- Country: Philippines
- Languages: English; Filipino

Why Is Yellow the Middle of the Rainbow? (Filipino: Bakit Dilaw ang Gitna ng Bahaghari?, also known as I Am Furious... Yellow) is a 1994 Filipino collage film edited, shot, co-written, and directed by Kidlat Tahimik.

== Summary ==
It follows the filmmaker and his young son during major events in the Philippines from 1980 to 1994.

== Production ==
It took ten years to make the film.

== See also ==
- List of films with longest production time
- Cinema of the Philippines
- List of Filipino films
