= Azucena (film) =

2000 drama film by Carlos Siguion-Reyna

- Directed by: Carlos Siguion-Reyna
- Written by: Enrique Ramos
- Produced by: Carlos Siguion-Reyna
- Starring: Ricky Davao; Glydel Mercado; Dante Rivero; Alessandra de Rossi
- Cinematography: Romulo Araojo
- Edited by: Manet Dayrit
- Music by: Ryan Cayabyab
- Production company: Reyna Films
- Distributed by: Millennium Cinema
- Release date: May 31, 2000
- Running time: 118 minutes
- Country: Philippines
- Languages: Filipino; English

Azucena is a 2000 Filipino drama film directed by Carlos Siguion-Reyna. The film stars Ricky Davao, Glydel Mercado, Dante Rivero and Alessandra de Rossi on her theatrical debut. This also marks Anjanette Abayari's final theatrical appearance, albeit on a special participation role.

== Plot ==
Lily (Alessandra) lives with her father Tomas (Ricky) and stepmother (Glydel). Her parents sell Lily's aging dog, whom she calls her best friend, to Teban (Dante) for dog meat and asocena. Lily, however, convinces Teban to return her dog and then begins a friendship with him. This causes the ire of her friends and family. Teban becomes her surrogate father, who supports her for her needs.

== Cast ==
- Ricky Davao as Tomas
- Glydel Mercado as Sonia
- Dante Rivero as Teban
- Alessandra de Rossi as Lily
- Anjanette Abayari as Lily's mother
- Tony Mabesa as Tomas' boss
- Romy Romulo as Mario
- Mon Confiado as Policeman
- Allen Dizon as Policeman
- Richard Joson as Policeman
- Crispin Pineda as Policeman
- Dennis Marasigan as Bar Manager
- Idda Yaneza as Panciteria Owner
- Richard Arellano as Panciteria Owner's son
- Sherry Lara as School Principal
- Minnie Aguilar as Mrs. Duran
- Carlo Cannu as Nico
- Anna Cathrina Lalin as Lea
- Noreen Agua as Shirley
- Gigi Locsin as Sonia's friend
- Olga Natividad as Sonia's friend
- Madeleine Nicolas as Lily's godmother
- Danny Labra as Dodong
- Jojit Lorenzo as Boy
- Bernard Palanca as Dog Seller
- Debbie Ignacio as Lily Lookalike
- Christian Apilado as Timothy
- Amily Cesista as Jeepney Passenger
- Louie Domingo as Jeepney Passenger
- Rose Gacula as Bather

== Awards ==
Year	Awards	Category	Recipient	Result	Ref.
2001	49th FAMAS Awards	Best Supporting Actress	Alessandra de Rossi	Won	
2001	19th FAP Awards	Best Cinematography	Romulo Araojo	Won	
2001	2nd San Diego Asian Film Festival	Narrative Feature	Azucena	Won	
