= Sakaling Hindi Makarating =

2016 road drama film by Ice Idanan

- Theatrical film poster
- Directed by: Ice Idanan
- Written by: Ice Idanan; Petersen Vargas
- Produced by: Patrick Ostrea; Lyle Sacris
- Starring: Alessandra de Rossi; Teri Malvar; JC Santos; Pepe Herrera
- Cinematography: Ice Idanan
- Edited by: Ilsa Malsi; Hannah Espia
- Music by: Mon Espia
- Production company: Media East Productions
- Release dates: 19 June 2016 (CineFilipino Film Festival); 1 February 2017 (Philippines)
- Running time: 90 minutes
- Country: Philippines
- Language: Filipino
- Budget: ₱4.5 million; €87,359.00

Sakaling Hindi Makarating (English: In Case They Don't Arrive) is a 2016 Philippine independent road drama film co-written, shot, co-produced, and directed by Ice Idanan in her directorial debut. The film stars Alessandra de Rossi, Teri Malvar, JC Santos, and Pepe Herrera. It is an official entry to the 2nd CineFilipino Film Festival, where it won seven awards including Best Picture and Best Director.

The film had its theatrical release in the Philippines on February 1, 2017.

== Plot ==
Cielo, a 27-year-old workaholic, is laid off with a large severance check. She is then forced to move into a smaller place, an apartment that she bought with her ex-fiancé. With nothing to do but nurse a broken heart, she feels like her life is beginning to take a turn for the worse.

One day, an anonymous postcard arrives. These postcards arrive from different places, and attached to them are different artworks, made and written by the same hand. She grows fond of these letters and feels a sense of intimacy with the author.

With the help of the anonymous postcards and her new neighbor, Paul (Pepe Herrera), she finally decides to go on a trip using the postcards as a guide, rediscovering not only her country but also herself. Lessons are learned, and friendships are made as the story of Cielo and the anonymous writer unfolds.

== Cast ==
- Alessandra de Rossi as Cielo
- Pepe Herrera as Paul
- Hiraya Plata as Aisha
- JC Santos as Manuel
- Karen delos Reyes as Gina, Manuel's sister
- Marius Talampas as Norms
- Gabriela Sebastian as Sarah
- Jay Gonzaga as Mark
- Therese Malvar as Sol
- Elijah Canlas as Benjie
- Lesley Lina as Camila
- Irma Adlawan as Cielo's mother

== Reception ==
=== Critical response ===
Oggs Cruz from Rappler states in his review that "Given that the film teases about the identity of a certain person who would have completed Cielo's thirst for the perfect romance, its ending, which keeps things within the universe of uncertainty, is delightfully bittersweet." He also praised Idanan's photography calling it "evidently beautiful".

=== Accolades ===
Year	Organization	Category	Nominated work	Result
2016	CineFilipino Film Festival	Best Director	Ice Idanan	Won
2016	CineFilipino Film Festival	Best Actor	Pepe Herrera	Won
2016	CineFilipino Film Festival	Best Cinematography	Ice Idanan tied with Tey Clamor for Ned's Project	Won
2016	CineFilipino Film Festival	Best Musical Score	Mon Espia	Won
2016	CineFilipino Film Festival	Best Sound	Raffy Magsaysay	Won
2016	CineFilipino Film Festival	Best Editing	Hannah Espia	Won
2016	CineFilipino Film Festival	Best Picture	Sakaling Hindi Makarating	Won (2nd Place)
