= Alessandra de Rossi =

Filipino actress (born 1984)

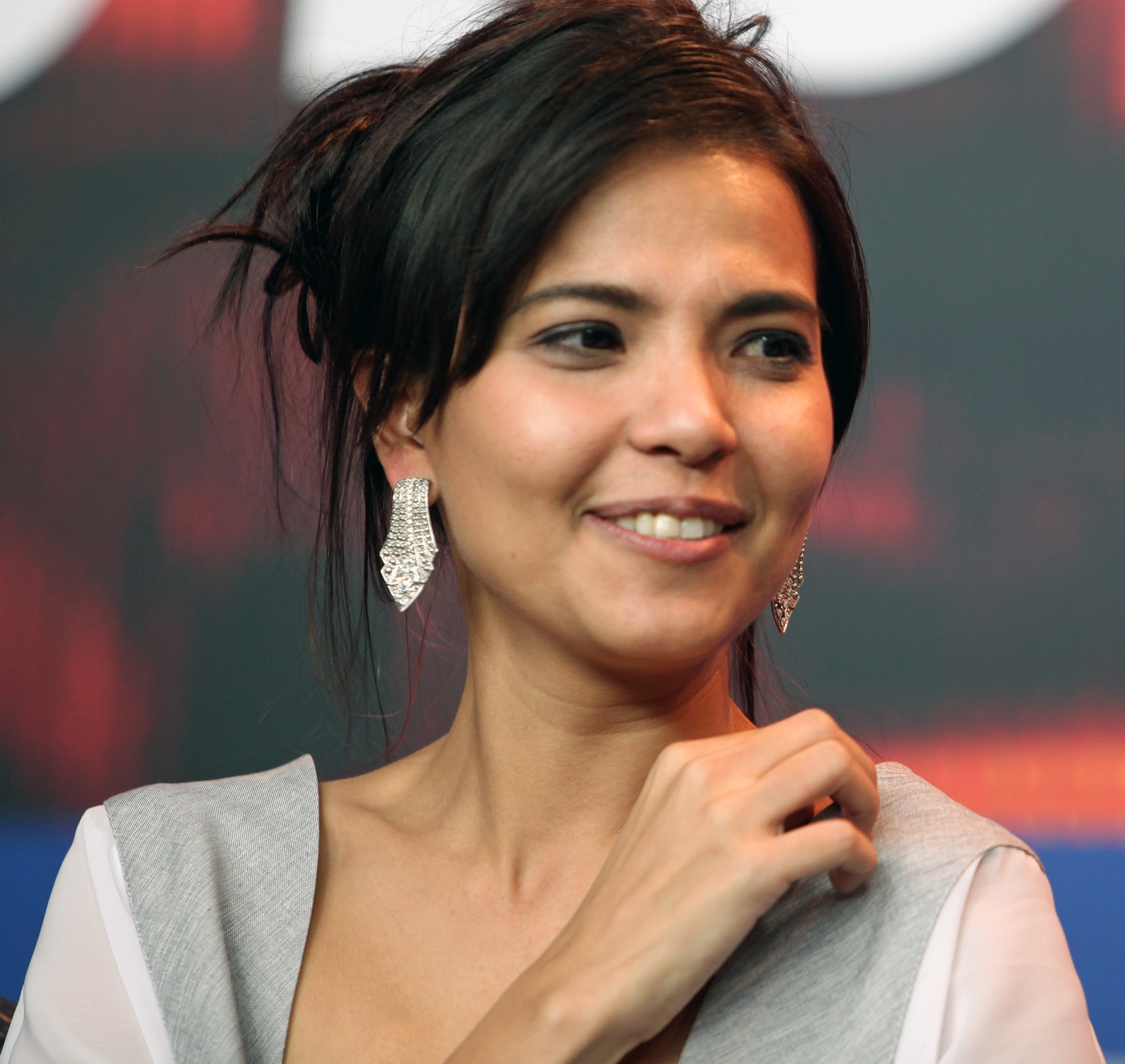
- De Rossi at the Berlin International Film Festival in 2016
- Born: Alessandra Tiotangco Schiavone; July 19, 1984 (age 42); London, England
- Citizenship: Philippines; Italy
- Occupations: Actress; director; screenwriter; businesswoman
- Years active: 1997–present
- Relatives: Assunta de Rossi (sister)
- Awards: Full list

Alessandra de Rossi (born Alessandra Tiotangco Schiavone; July 19, 1984) is a Filipino actress and director. Known for her dramatic and comedic performances in independent film and television, she made her screen debut in the comedy series !Oka Tokat (1997–1998). Her breakthrough came when she played Valentina in the series Darna (2005), which led to her landing various supporting and antagonist roles in television. For her work, de Rossi has received accolades from various award-giving bodies, including an ASEAN International Film Festival and Awards, three FAMAS Awards, three Gawad Urian Awards, three PMPC Star Awards for Movies and a QCinema International Film Festival Award.

== Early life ==
Alessandra de Rossi was born Alessandra Tiotangco Schiavone on July 19, 1984, in London, England. Her father, Luigi Schiavone, is Italian from Martano, and her mother, Nenita Schiavone, is Filipina. She has an older sister, Assunta, and a younger sister, Margarita. Her family moved back to Italy when she was young, and she grew up in Italy with her parents. Both Alessandra and Assunta appeared together on Philippine television during their childhood, as their mother brought them into television shows while they were growing up.

== Career ==
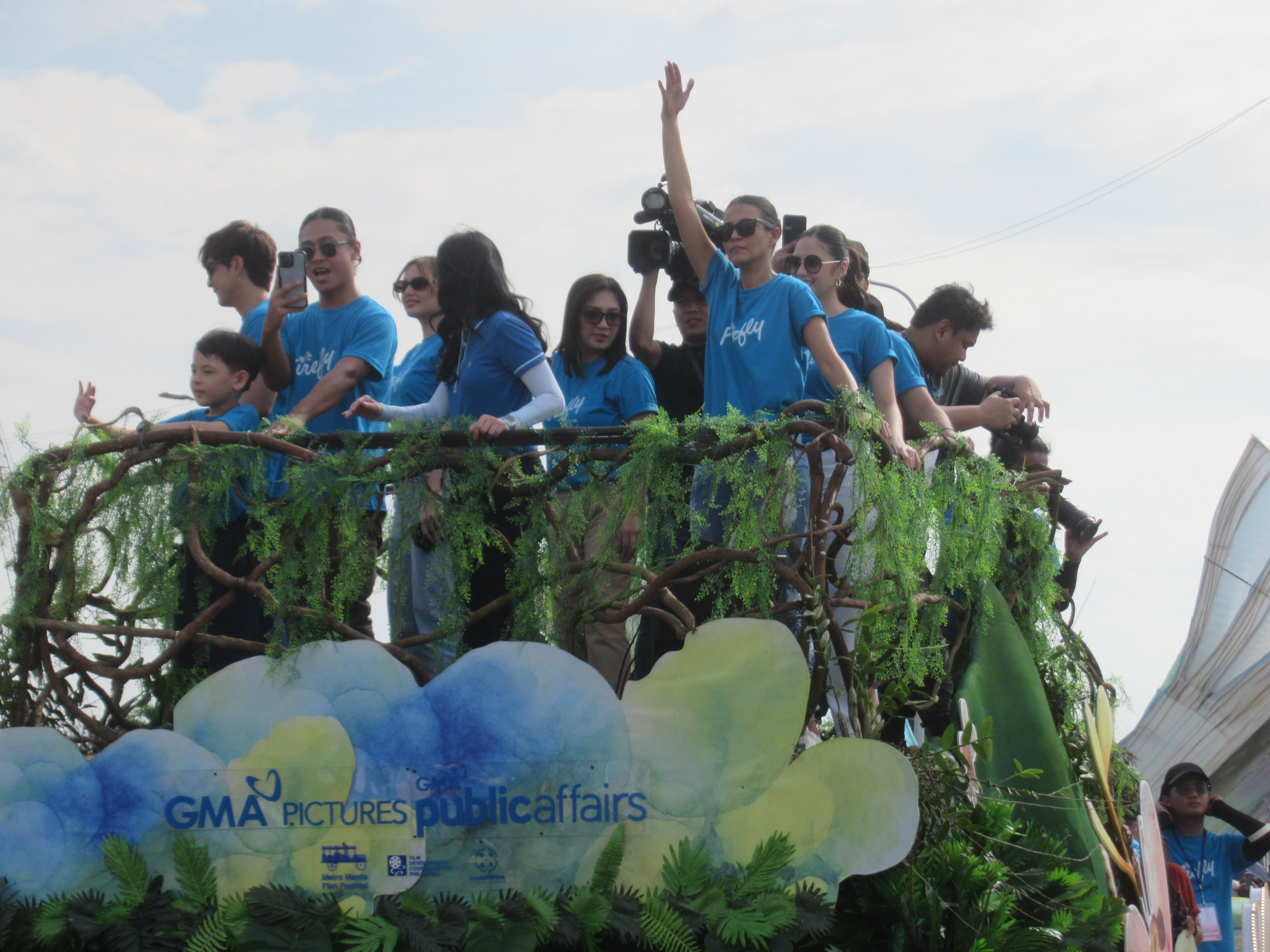
De Rossi promoting Firefly at the 2023 Metro Manila Film Festival parade of stars

In 2017, De Rossi co-starred in the romantic comedy film Kita Kita, starring alongside comedian Empoy Marquez. The film eventually became the highest-grossing Filipino independent film of all time, earning ₱300 million (approximately US$5.88 million) within three weeks of its release. Due to the movie's popularity, Philippine entertainment media sources dubbed their pairing as "AlEmpoy".

After her successful portrayal in Kita Kita, De Rossi pledged not to accept antagonist roles anymore in either television and feature films. De Rossi returned to Viva when she signed exclusive contract with Viva Artists Agency and made her film production business co-ventured by Viva Films named AWOO, acronym of "A World of Our Own"; her first movie Magic Kingdom was produced & released by Viva Films in 1997.

She and Marquez returned as a love team in the 2023 film, Walang KaParis, produced by Viva Films.

== Other ventures ==
=== Director ===
De Rossi directed, co-produced, and starred her first feature film, My Amanda, a romantic drama co-starring Piolo Pascual which was released in 2021. The film was released in Netflix.

She directed her second film, Everyone knows, Every Juan, a family film which was released in October 2025.

=== Business ===
De Rossi founded her own company, A World of Our Own (AWOO Production), and she is the CEO since 2021 AWOO Production has a film outfit production and a music record label, AWOO Music Records, which is a sub-label of Lilly Star Records. Hya and Alfa were the first two artists to join AWOO Records in 2021.

== Filmography ==
=== Film ===
Year	Title	Role	Notes	Sources
1997	Magic Kingdom			
1998	Mystrio (Uno...Dos...Tres Pilyos!)	Juliet		
2001	Hubog	Nikka		
2001	Azucena	Lily		
2002	Small Voices	Melinda		
2002	Pakisabi na lang...Mahal ko siya	Icee		
2003	Mano Po 2: My Home	Ingrid		
2003	Homecoming	Abigael Edades		
2003	The Cory Quirino Kidnap: NBI Files	Helen		
2003	Message Sent			
2004	Astigmatism	Rio		
2004	Spirit of the Glass	Myra		
2005	The Maid	Rosa Dimaano		
2005	Kutob	Mayen		
2006	Barcelona	Clarissa		
2007	Hide & Seek	Dolor Buntag		
2008	One Night Only	Angela		
2009	Independencia	Stranger		
2009	Manila	Aleria		
2009	Pinoy Sunday	Celia		
2010	Romeo at Juliet	Angel		
2010	Presa			
2010	Dalaw	Trina		
2011	Busong			
2011	Ka Oryang	Oryang		
2012	Sta. Niña	Madel		
2012	Mater Dolorosa	Fatima		
2012	Baybayin	Alba		
2013	Alfredo S. Lim (The Untold Story)	Amalia		
2013	Liars	Eloisa		
2013	The Mango Tree	Maria		
2013	Woman of the Ruins			
2014	Relaks, It's Just Pag-Ibig	Mace		
2014	Mauban: Ang Resiko	Lota		
2015	Bambanti	Belyn		
2015	Kid Kulafu	Dionisia Pacquiao		
2015	Water Lemon			
2016	A Lullaby to the Sorrowful Mystery	Caesaria Belarmino		
2016	Sakaling Hindi Makarating	Cielo		
2016	Echorsis	Girl Vatuh		
2017	Kita Kita	Lea		
2017	12	Erika		
2018	Through Night and Day	Jen		
2019	Lucid	Ann		
2019	Unforgettable			
2020	Watch List	Maria		
2021	My Amanda	Amanda (Fream)	Directorial debut, also writer	
2023	Walang KaParis	Marie		
2023	What If	Billie		
2023	Firefly	Elay		
2024	Green Bones	Betty		
2025	Republika ng Pipolipinas	Herself		
2025	Everyone Knows Every Juan	Raquel Sevilla		
2026	Status: Rejected	Anna		

=== Television/digital series ===
Year	Title	Role	Notes	Source
1997–1998	!Oka Tokat	Teresa		
1997–2001; 2008–2011; 2016–2019	ASAP	Herself / Co-host / Performer		
1997	Maalaala Mo Kaya	Girlfriend	Episode: "Tula"	
1998–1999	Cyberkada	Herself — Host		
2000–2003	Click	Ian Rufino		
2000	Kakabakaba (Episode: The Feast)			
2001–2002	Biglang Sibol, Bayang Impasibol			
2001	Sayang Pinagpala, Isa Pang Awit ni Bernadette	Michelle		
2002–2003	Kung Mawawala Ka	Paloma Montemayor		
2003	Kool Ka Lang	Maji Magdangal		
2004	Maalaala Mo Kaya	Nancy Navalta	Episode: "Ribbon"	
2004	24 Oras	Herself	Chika Minute Anchor	
2004	Hanggang Kailan	Jennifer Villarama		
2005	Darna	Valentina		
2005	Etheria: Ang Ikalimang Kaharian ng Encantadia	Hera Andora		
2006	Encantadia: Pag-ibig Hanggang Wakas	Hera Andora		
2006	Now and Forever: Linlang	Brenda Villarreal		
2006	MMS: My Music Station / MMS: Music Mo Sikat	Herself – Host		
2007	Magpakailanman	Liza Dela Cruz	Episode: "The Liza Dela Cruz Story"	
2007	Super Twins	Nickelina Paredes		
2007	Maalaala Mo Kaya		Episode: "CD Player"	
2007–2008	Sine Novela: Pasan Ko Ang Daigdig	Luming		
2008	E.S.P.	Madel / Maybel	Episode: "The New Friend"	
2008	Kamandag	Eleanor		
2008	Maalaala Mo Kaya	April	Episode: "Pedicab"	
2008	Maalaala Mo Kaya	Eloisa	Episode: "Sanggol"	
2008	I Love Betty La Fea	Cristina Larson	Special Guest	
2008–2009	Komiks: Dragonna	Alice		
2009	Your Song	Flora	Episode: "Babalik Kang Muli"	
2009	Maalaala Mo Kaya	Nellie	Episode: "Pedicab"	
2009	Tayong Dalawa	Greta Romano		
2010	Your Song	Katrina	Episode: "My Last Romance"	
2010	Wansapanataym	Cara, Kanan and Kaliwa	Episodes: "Cara Part 1 / 2"	
2010	Agua Bendita	Divina Caguiat Montenegro		
2010	Maalaala Mo Kaya	Nena	Episode: "Pera"	
2010	Agimat: Ang Mga Alamat ni Ramon Revilla: Tonyong Bayawak	Mary Ann "Maring" Dela Cruz		
2010	Magkaribal	Young Vera Cruz-Abella	Special Participation	
2011	Green Rose	Geena Rallos / Sonia Francisco		
2011	Maalaala Mo Kaya	Emily Nepomuceno	Episode: "Bracelet"	
2011	Sinner or Saint	Corrine Quisumbing-Marcelo		
2011	Busong	Punay		
2012	Legacy	Bernadette Leviste	Main Cast / Primary Anti-Hero / Protagonist	
2012	Tweets for My Sweet	London		
2012–2013	Pahiram ng Sandali	Baby Umali-Reyes		
2013	Magpakailanman	Russel Contemplacion	Episode: "The Life, and Death of Flor Contemplacion"	
2013	Home Sweet Home	Icy Queen	Special Guest	
2013	Sunday All Stars	Herself – Performer		
2013–2014	Magkano Ba ang Pag-ibig?	Geraldine "Gigi" Ramos-Buenaventura		
2014	Magpakailanman	Joy	Episode: "My Psychotic Husband"	
2014	Wagas	Narcisa	Episode: "Comfort Woman Love Story"	
2014–2015	Basta Every Day, Happy!	Herself / Co-Host		
2014	Ang Dalawang Mrs. Real	Alessandra "Sandy" Alegre-Real		
2015	Yagit	Marilou "Lulu" Prado-Villaroman / Anastacia "Ana" Santos		
2016	Wish I May	Loretta Atienza-Vergara / Villafuerte		
2016	Wagas	Laura	Episode: "The One That Got Away"	
2016	Wagas	Imelda	Episode: "Hindi Na Ako Kilala ng Asawa Ko"	
2016	Ipaglaban Mo!	Joan	Episode "Misyonaryo"	
2016–2017	Langit Lupa	Daisylyn "Dey" Marasigan-Garcia	Special Participation	
2016–2017	FPJ's Ang Probinsyano	Rowena Macaraeg		
2017	Ipaglaban Mo!	Marie	Episode: "Suspetsa"	
2018	Since I Found You	Janice Punzalan		
2019	Ipaglaban Mo!	Josie Manalili	Episode: "Damay"	
2019	Tadhana	Kalima	Episode: "Libya"	
2019	Tadhana	Dang	Episode: "Sister, at War Part 1 / 2"	
2019	Maalaala Mo Kaya	Emma	Episode: "Palay"	
2023	Replacing Chef Chico	Ella		
2024	Ang Himala ni Niño	Marie		
2024	Running Man Philippines	Herself/ Guest	Episode 3	
2024–2025	May 4 Ever	May		
