= Kidlat Tahimik =

Filipino film director and actor

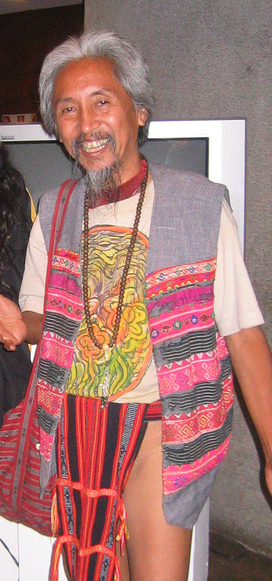
- Kidlat Tahimik in 2006
- Born: Eric Oteyza de Guia; October 3, 1942 (age 83); Baguio, Benguet, Commonwealth of the Philippines
- Education: University of the Philippines Diliman (BA); Wharton School, University of Pennsylvania (MBA)
- Occupations: Filmmaker; Installation artist
- Known for: Mababangong Bangungot (Perfumed Nightmare); Why Is Yellow the Middle of the Rainbow? Turumba
- Spouse: Katrin de Guia
- Children: 3
- Mother: Virginia de Guia
- Awards: Order of National Artists of the Philippines

Eric Oteyza de Guia (born October 3, 1942), better known as Kidlat Tahimik ("Silent Lightning"), is a film director, writer and actor whose films are commonly associated with the Third Cinema movement through their critiques of neocolonialism. For his contributions to the development of Philippine independent cinema, he was recognized in 2018 as a National Artist of the Philippines for Film - a conferment which represents the Philippine state's highest recognition for artists.

One of the most prominent names in the Filipino film industry, he has garnered various accolades locally and internationally, including a Plaridel honorarium for independent cinema. He is dubbed by fellow filmmakers and critics as the "Father of Philippine Independent Cinema".

In recent years, Tahimik has become a noted installation artist with his works exhibited in various public spaces in the Philippines.

== Early life and education ==
Tahimik was born in Baguio, Philippines, a summer report community established in the presence of several American military bases. Coming from a well-to-do family, he attended the University of the Philippines Diliman, where he was elected President of the UP Student Council, then known as the University Student Union, from 1962 to 1963. While attending the university he became a member of the Upsilon Sigma Phi fraternity. Later on Tahimik studied at the University of Pennsylvania's Wharton School, earning a Master in Business Administration and worked as a researcher for the Organisation for Economic Co-operation and Development (OECD) in Paris from 1968 to 1972.. The experience profoundly disenchanted him with global development models that evaluate progress only through economic and technological lenses, like those linked to the World Bank and International Monetary Fund. Following a summer spent working on a Norwegian farm, Tahimik tore up his diploma, resigned from his job, and committed himself to storytelling, starting with playwriting.

Upon his return, he founded AIESEC in the Philippines.

== Influences and works ==
Tahimik’s early films focus on the cultural effects of colonialism and imperialism, most notably the semi-autobiographical Perfumed Nightmare (1977) and Turumba (1983). Perfumed Nightmare was created on a limited budget and is considered to be a classic of Third Cinema, winning the Independent Award category of 27th Berlin International Film Festival.

The latter of these two films provides some insight into the circumstances that brought him to Europe and into the presence of filmmaker Werner Herzog, who along with director Francis Ford Coppola and his American Zoetrope studio, was instrumental in helping to release Perfumed Nightmare in the United States.

== Personal life ==
Kidlat is the son of former Baguio Mayor Virginia de Guia. Kidlat's wife is German artist and writer Katrin De Guia. They had three children: Kidlat de Guia (or Kidlat Gottlieb Kalayaan); Kawayan Thor Kalayaan; and Kabunian De Guia (or Kabunian Cedric Enrique).

In February 2004, a fire was reported to have spread in their 4-story home in Benguet, Philippines. The family was able to escape safely, but the director's film stock and collection of art and artifacts were destroyed.

Tahimik owns the vegetarian cafe Oh My Gulay located at the top of the La Azotea building in Baguio, Philippines. He also owns and maintains the Ili-Likha Artist's Village in Baguio.

== Filmography ==
=== Director ===
==== Feature films ====
- Perfumed Nightmare (1977)
- Who Invented the Yoyo? Who Invented the Moon Buggy? (1979)
- Turumba (1983)
- Takedera Mon Amour: Diary of a Bamboo Connection (1991)
- Why Is Yellow the Middle of the Rainbow? (with Kidlat Gottlieb Kalayaan; also known as I Am Furious... Yellow, 1989 and 1994)
- BalikBayan #1: Memories of Overdevelopment (Redux III, 2015; Redux VI, 2017; Redux VII, 2023)
- Lakbayan (segment: "Kabayan’s Journey to Liwanang", 2018)

==== Short films ====
The films listed here are less than 50 minutes in length:

- Yan Ki Made in Hong Kong (1980)
- Orbit 50: Letters to My 3 Sons (1992)
- Celebrating the Year 2021, Today (1995)
- Japanese Summers of a Filipino Fundoshi (1996)
- Banal Kahoy (Holy Wood) (2000)
- Aqua Planet (2003)
- Some More Rice (2005)
- Our Film – Grimage to Guimaras (2006)
- BUBONG! Roofs of the World! Unite! (2006)
- Ang Balikbayan: Memories of Overdevelopment 1980–2010 (2010)

==== Television film ====
- Olympisches Gold (from Vater Unser, 1981)

=== Writer ===
- Perfumed Nightmare (1977)
- Turumba (1983)
- Why Is Yellow the Middle of the Rainbow? (1994)
- BalikBayan #1: Memories of Overdevelopment (2015; 2017)

=== Producer ===
- Perfumed Nightmare (1977)
- Turumba (1983)
- Abong: Small Home (2003)

=== Actor ===
- The Enigma of Kaspar Hauser (1974) – Hombrecito
- Perfumed Nightmare (1977) – Kidlat
- Jag rodnar (I Am Blushing, 1981)
- Smaragd (1987)
- José Rizal (1998) – La Liga Filipina guest
- Abong: Small Home (2003)
- BalikBayan #1: Memories of Overdevelopment (2015; 2017; 2023) – Enrique of Malacca
- 1941: Cordillera Iti Ima ti Gubat (2022)

== Awards and honors ==
=== Awards ===
- 27th Berlin International Film Festival International Critics Award: Perfumed Nightmare (1977)
- Mannheim Film Festival Top Cash Award: Turumba (1981)
- Fukuoka Asian Culture Prize Laureate, Arts and Culture Prize (2012)
- Berlin Film Festival Caligari Award: Balikbayan #1 Memories of Overdevelopment Redux III (2015)
- Prince Claus Laureate (2018)

=== National honors ===
- Gawad Plaridel (by the University of Philippines) (2009)
- National Artist of the Philippines (Film and Broadcast Arts) (2018)

==== Honorary degree ====
- University of the Cordilleras – Doctor of Humanities (August 24, 2018)
