= Christiane Cegavske =

American artist and stop motion animator

- Occupation(s): Artist, animator
- Website: christianecegavske.com

Christiane Cegavske is an American artist and stop motion animator.

She is primarily known for her animated film Blood Tea and Red String and for having done the animated segments to the film The Heart Is Deceitful Above All Things. She has also made a short film Blood and Sunflowers and has done animation for the TV series X-Chromosome. Her second animated feature, Seed in the Sand, is currently in production as of 2023.

== See also ==
- Jan Švankmajer
- Ladislas Starevich
- Ray Harryhausen
- Jiří Barta
- Brothers Quay
