= Kita Kita =

- Theatrical release poster
- English: I See You
- Directed by: Sigrid Andrea Bernardo
- Written by: Sigrid Andrea Bernardo
- Produced by: Piolo Jose Pascual; Joyce Bernal; Erick Raymundo; Sky Gonda; Erwin Blanco
- Starring: Alessandra De Rossi; Empoy Marquez
- Narrated by: Piolo Pascual
- Cinematography: Boy Yñiguez
- Edited by: Marya Ignacio
- Music by: Arlene Flerida Calvo
- Production company: Viva Films Spring Films Sharo Entertainment Productions
- Distributed by: Viva Films
- Release dates: March 10, 2017 (Osaka Asian Film Festival); July 19, 2017 (Philippines)
- Running time: 95 minutes
- Country: Philippines
- Language: Filipino
- Budget: ₱10 million
- Box office: ₱320 million

Kita Kita (I See You; Japanese: キタ キタ) is a 2017 Philippine romantic comedy film written and directed by Sigrid Andrea P. Bernardo, and starring Alessandra de Rossi and Empoy Marquez. Set in Sapporo, Japan, the film follows Lea (De Rossi), a Filipino tour guide living in Japan who goes blind after having witnessed her Japanese fiancé's infidelity. After a while, fellow Filipino and charmer Tonyo (Marquez) makes a sudden appearance and befriends the visually impaired Lea in the best possible ways; eventually, they fall for one another. The film is produced by Joyce Bernal and Piolo Pascual's Spring Films and distributed by Viva Films.

Kita Kita had its world premiere in Japan at the 12th Osaka Asian Film Festival in March 2017, before a general release in the Philippines on July 19, 2017. The film received generally favorable reviews and has been deemed a sleeper hit, grossing ₱100 million on its first week and ₱240 million the following week, on a modest budget of ₱10 million. Kita Kita ended its theatrical run with a worldwide gross of ₱320 million, making it the highest-grossing Philippine independent film. Post-release, CNN Philippines considered Kita Kita to be one of the best romantic comedy films of the last 25 years.

== Plot ==
Lea is a Filipina tour guide living in Sapporo, Japan who is engaged to Nobu, a young Japanese man. One night, after receiving a note to meet up at a beer house, she discovers her fiancé flirting with her friend. Before venting out her anger, she counts slowly from one to ten, and recalls all the happy memories she shared with Nobu with each count. As she walks out, a stress-induced blindness occurs and she collapses.

Lea struggles to adjust to a life with temporary blindness. Sometime later, Tonyo, Lea's next-door neighbor who is also a Filipino introduces himself to her and makes an effort to cook for her and cheer her up despite being rebuffed several times. Tonyo eventually gains Lea's acquaintance and persuades her to tour with him in and around the city. The two spend most of their time traveling around tourist spots in Sapporo, with Tonyo serving as Lea's eyes through all of their moments. They eventually fall in love and make a promise to re-visit all the places they went to as soon as Lea regains her eyesight. They later celebrate a pseudo-wedding where Tonyo gives Lea a Daruma doll—a Japanese doll which is believed to fulfill wishes of the person who fills out its eyes—and wishes her recovery from blindness.

During one of their dates, Tonyo leaves Lea by the road to fetch a stuffed toy he intended to give Lea. At this point, Lea begins to regain her sight and, for the first time sees Tonyo waving at her from the other side of the road. Tonyo, surprised and filled with joy, dashes to Lea but is hit by a vehicle and dies.

After Tonyo's death, Lea visits his home, and discovers a letter he left for her. She learns that Tonyo moved from Tokyo to Sapporo, having suffered a broken heart when he was cheated on. It is then revealed that Lea had in fact met him early on. He was a drunken man who slept on the street in front of Lea's home. Lea had been consistently taking care of him, providing him with stir-fried cabbage for food and a blanket. Touched by her kindness, he vowed to better himself, and moved to a house right across from Lea's. One night, a heartbroken Lea—wearing a giant heart suit—spends time instead with a banana mascot who, unbeknownst to her, is also Tonyo. He was the one who sent her a note to meet up at a beer house after discovering her fiancé's infidelity and carried her home after she collapsed the night she lost her sight. The letter also reveals that Tonyo was suffering from a heart problem. His heart had been enlarged since he was nine years old; he was told that it could burst anytime and he would die, thus his wanting to do everything for Lea before it happened

Overcome with grief, Lea reminisces about their moments and fulfills her promise by re-visiting all the places they had been, putting on a blindfold in every place.

== Cast ==
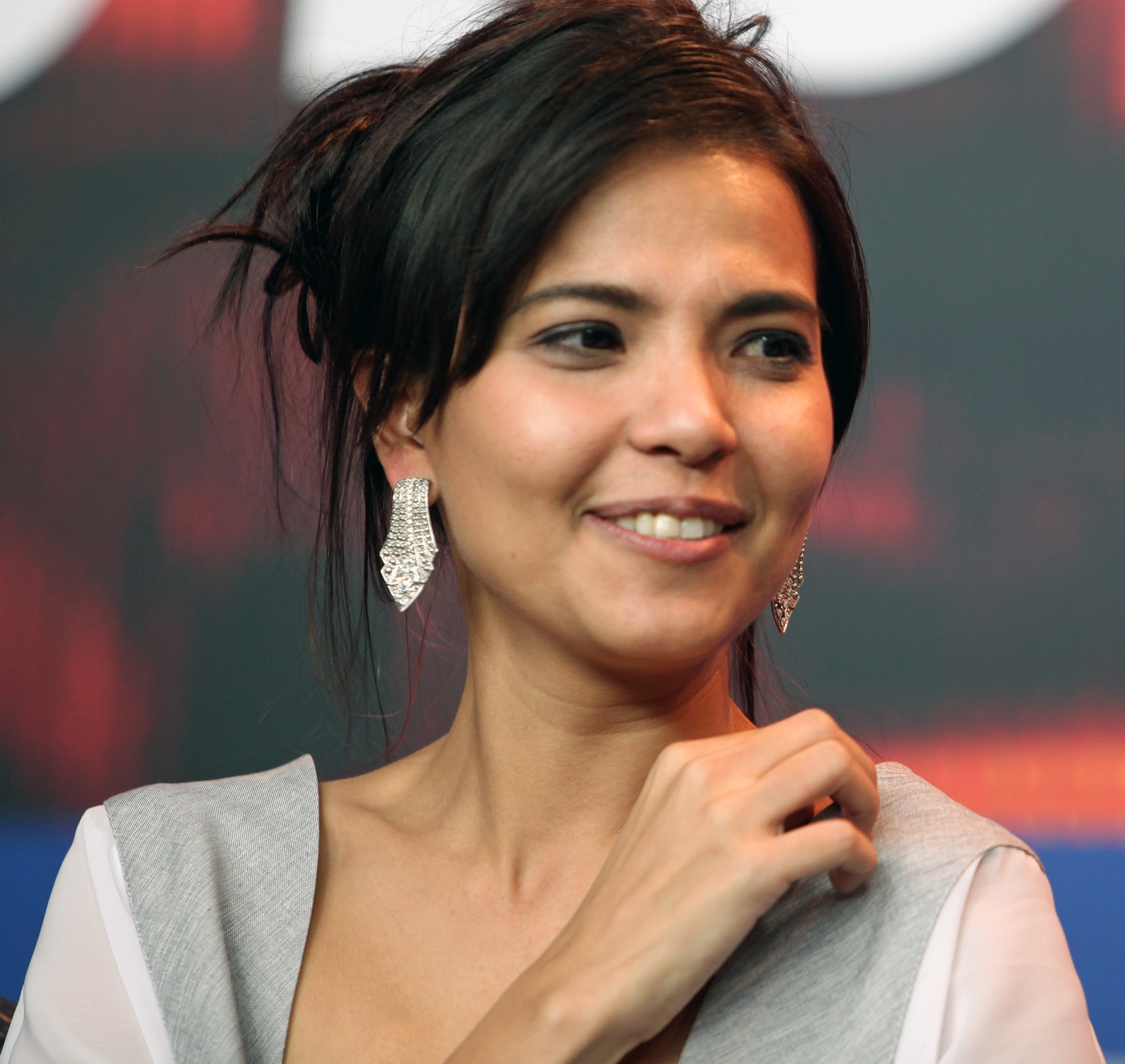
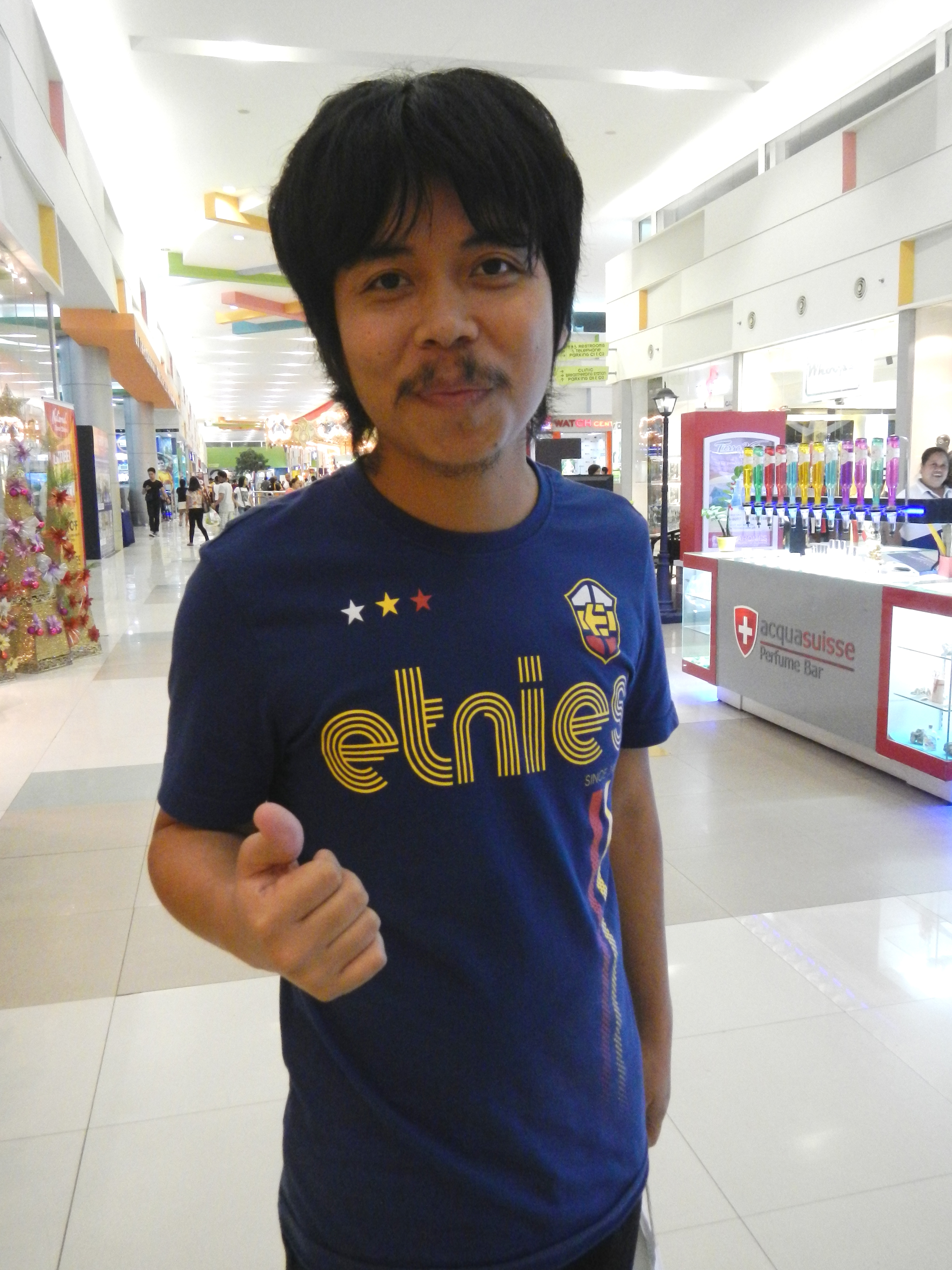
Alessandra de Rossi (left) and Empoy Marquez (right) played the film's leads.
- Alessandra de Rossi as Lea, a Filipino tour guide in Sapporo. She was left heartbroken after catching her Japanese boyfriend cheating with a Filipino-Japanese woman, and went blind.
- Empoy Marquez as Tonyo, a fellow Filipino who lives across the street from Lea. Marquez portrayed the character which, according to co-producer Piolo Pascual, was specifically written for Marquez. Pascual had expressed his desire to do the role but later relinquished it to Marquez.
- Junpei Yamamoto as Nobu
- Carolle Urbano as Aiko
- Hiroshi Ito and Yukiyo Ichikawa as Old couple
- Yukiko Ohashi and Tricia Okada as Lesbian couple
- Hanano Koma as Girl
- Yuki Ishikawa as Bartender
- Mai Niizuma, Koharu Niizuma, Chie Narita, Riko Narita as Beer garden guests
- Hannah Espia as Tonyo's ex-girlfriend
- Director Sigrid Andrea Bernardo as Lea's sister (voice cameo only)
- Director JP Habac as Banana man

== Production ==
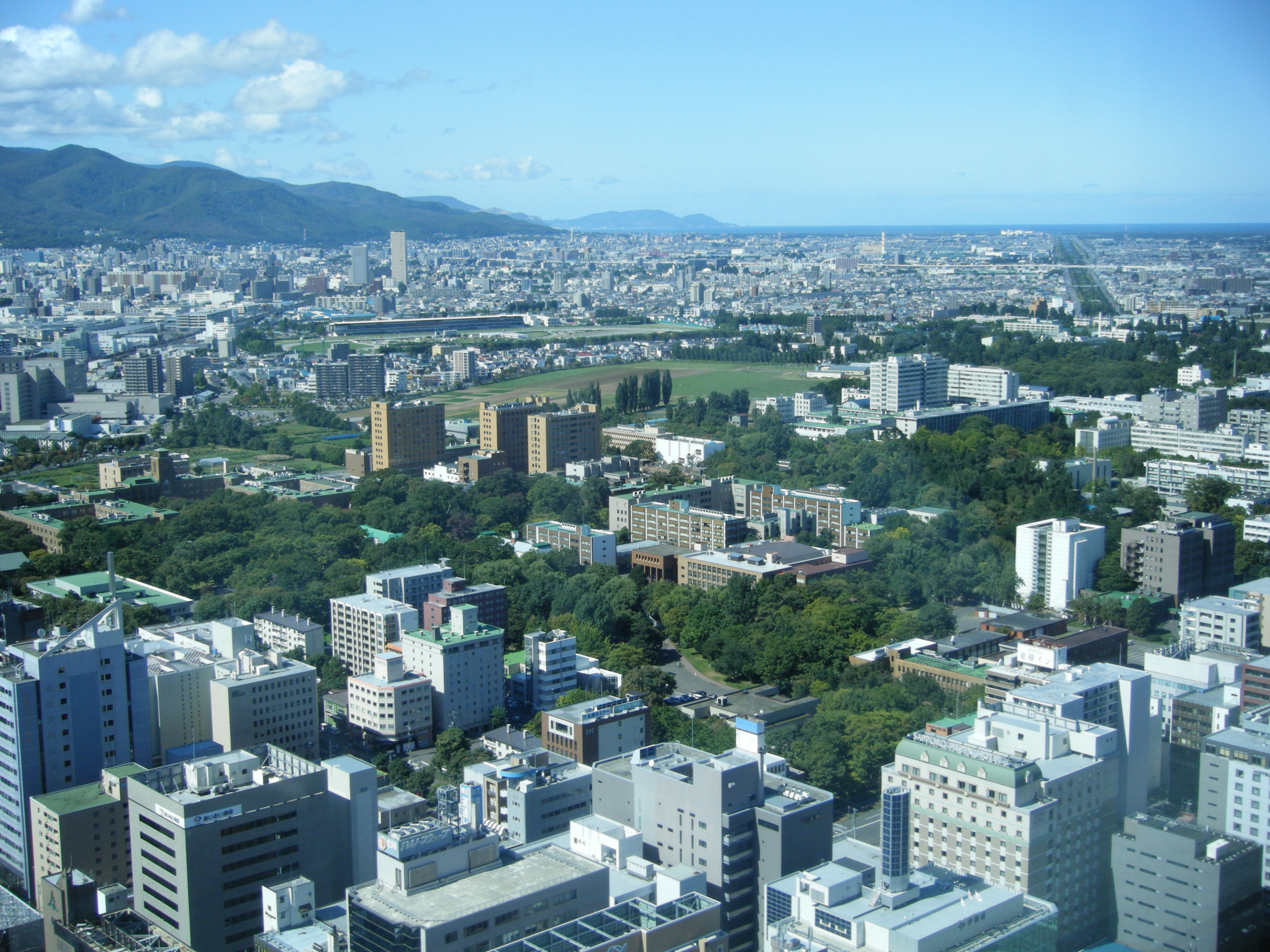
Sapporo, the primary setting of the film.

=== Development ===
Lucky Blanco, one of the film's producers, was responsible for initiating the concept for Kita Kita. It was originally intended to be a romance story involving three people characterized as unattractive. Blanco forwarded a script to director Sigrid Andrea Bernardo, who then decided to give focus to only two characters that would be later portrayed by Empoy Marquez and Alessandra de Rossi. The concept was revised to a romantic-comedy story involving a "not so good-looking" man in a film which will be shot "in a beautiful place". Kita Kita was green-lit for production after the script's second draft was reviewed.

Bernardo said that she wanted Kita Kita to focus on the concept of "falling in love even if you don’t see the person" and added that its story also focuses on the life of Overseas Filipino Workers, particularly on their experiences of entering into romantic relationships during their stay outside the Philippines.

Spring Films, an independent film production outfit founded by actor Piolo Pascual and director Joyce Bernal, made Kita Kita with a budget of ₱10 million (approximately US$211,000). It was co-produced by Viva Films.

=== Casting ===
De Rossi chose to do the role because she wanted to portray a character being courted instead of her previous roles of someone who would steal the boyfriend of another character. She describes the film in relation to her role as her "lightest film" and remarks that she was used to roles which involved heavy drama which she did not like due to restrictions she experienced.

Director Sigrid Andrea Bernardo described Marquez as "a discovery" for his portrayal as Tonyo remarking that the actor is not only good in doing comedies but also "has a heart for acting". She says that Marquez's portrayal of his character will make the audience see beyond his physical attributes. Bernardo also wanted the audience to see Marquez, who has a reputation as a comedian, to see his "serious side", saying that she wanted to show a balance of Marquez's serious and comedic sides through the film.

The characters of de Rossi and Marquez was characterized by Bernardo as two lonely Filipinos in Japan who were brought together due to their shared isolation. According to the director, the story of the film would not have worked well had it been set in the Philippines.

Pascual did a voice role as the narrator.

=== Filming ===
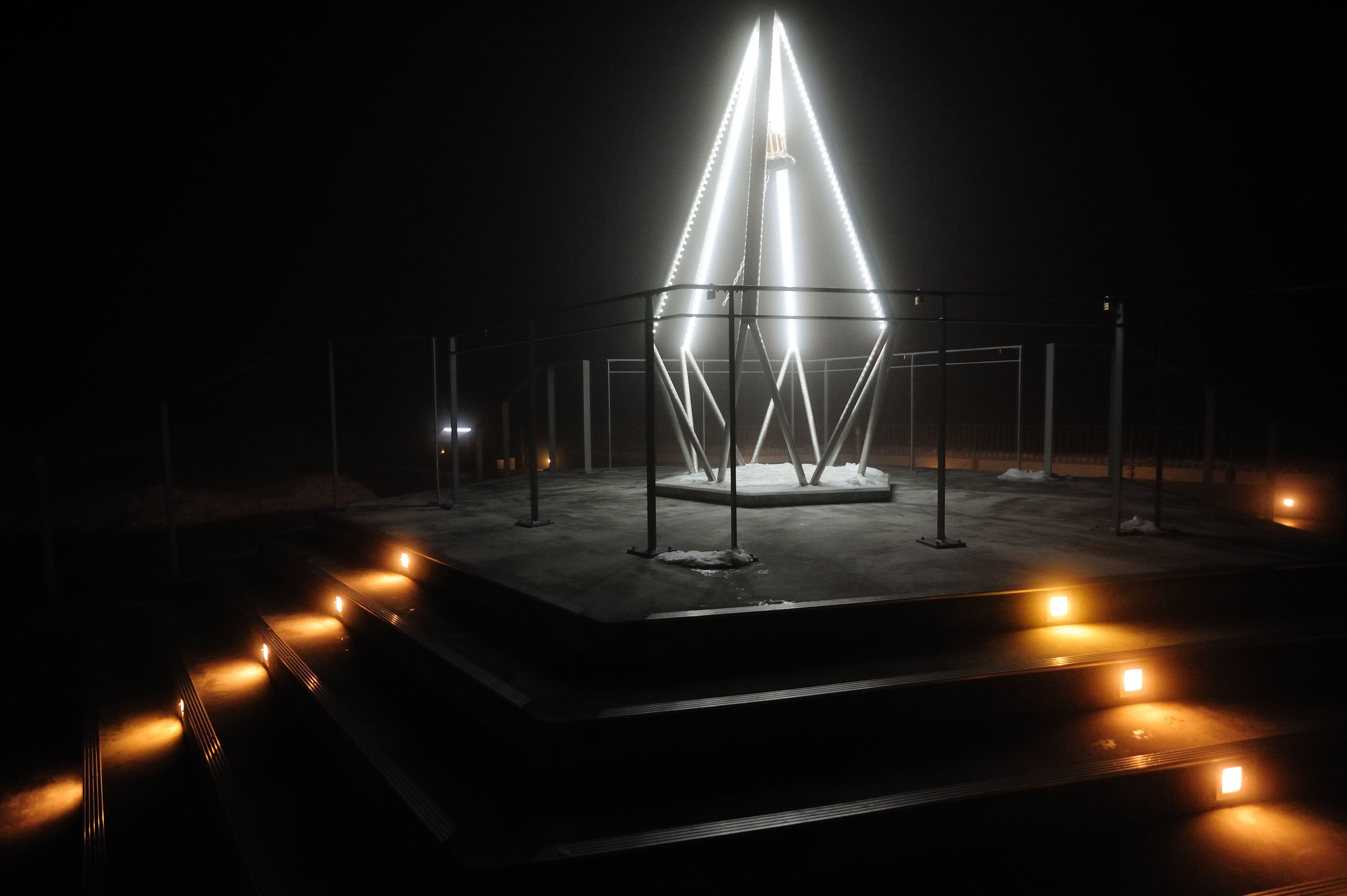
The Fortune Bell in Mount Moiwa.

Boy Yñiguez was the cinematographer of Kita Kita. Principal photography was done in Hokkaido, Japan in 2016, almost a year before its release. Among the shooting locations in Sapporo are Odori Park, the Sapporo TV Tower, Susukino, the Sapporo Clock Tower, the Historical Village of Hokkaido, Fushimi Inari Shrine, Mount Moiwa, and Moerenuma Park. In Otaru, scenes were filmed at the Otaru Music Box Museum and the Otaru Canal. Scenes were also shot in the Shikisai Hill flower park of Biei town in Kamikawa Subprefecture and on Mount Asahi in Higashikawa.

=== Post-production ===
The film was intended to be submitted as an entry to the 2016 Metro Manila Film Festival. It was pulled out from the film festival because of a rule that all entry films are to be picture lock or barred from further editing once they are submitted to the film festival organizers. Spring Films saw the need for re-editing. One of their decisions was to trim the 85-minute runtime for its theatrical run.

== Release ==
=== Marketing ===
In March 2017, a promotional teaser video showing a scene between the characters of Empoy Marquez and Alessandra de Rossi having a romantic conversation while eating ramen was released.

An advance screening of Kita Kita was held at the University of the Philippines Cine Adarna on March 12, 2017 which led to the promotion of the film through word-of-mouth marketing in social media. The actors and producers made use of the radio and television platforms as well as made mall appearances to promote the film.

The full trailer of Kita Kita was released on May 16, 2017. On July 4, 2017, the trailer recorded 6.4 million views in Facebook.

=== Osaka Asian Film Festival ===
Kita Kita premiered at the 12th Osaka Asian Film Festival which ran from March 3–12, 2017 and vied for the Grand Prix and Most Promising Talent awards. It was one of the three Philippine films competed for the honors aforementioned alongside Jerrold Tarog's Bliss and Borgy Torre's Tisay. The screening schedule of the film in the film festival was on March 10 and 11, 2017.

=== Theatrical run ===
Kita Kita was submitted to the 2016 Metro Manila Film Festival as a candidate bidding to be selected as one of the eight films to be shown during the run of the film festival but Spring Films decided to pull out from the film festival before the official eight entries were announced.

The film premiered in the Philippines on July 19, 2017 and had a special screening attended by Filipino celebrities and filmmakers four days prior. It was also highly anticipated in social media by the viewers.

Director Bernardo expected that the film will be pulled out from theaters the day after its premiere and the producers only hoped for the gross receipt would break even with the ₱10 million budget. Defying expectations, the film opened to ₱90 million in its first week across 120 locations. On July 27, 2017, it has already screened in 150 locations. In August 2017, the gross receipt went to ₱230 million and ₱240 million later on. Three weeks later, it reached ₱320 million, surpassing Heneral Luna's ₱257 million as the highest-grossing Philippine independent film.

=== Critical reception ===
Kita Kita was given an "A" grade by the Cinema Evaluation Board and was met with positive reviews from critics. Oggs Cruz of Rappler praised the film's lovable characters and the plot which did not rely heavily in romantic-comedy tropes; he said: "Kita Kita pursued its novelty of molding captivating characters out of unexpected leads while creating around them a droll and exotic world where both hard heartaches and fast hope collide. It is buoyant, without being too eager." Wanggo Gallaga of Interaksyon offered similar commentary on the plot and characters, arguing that it is "a charming film that gives us a fresh look into the rom-com genre. It doesn't rely on prefabricated chemistry or overly complicated plots". Ro Manalo of Cosmopolitan Philippines gave praise to its visuals and cinematography, and found the plot and characters endearing. Fred Hawson of ABS-CBN News scored it 8/10 and commended the on-screen relationship between Marquez and De Rossi, saying: "It was this unlikely pairing of De Rossi and Marquez that made Kita Kita work so well to engage its viewers to laugh and cry."

Writing for Esquire Philippines, Angelica Gutierrez opined that while she found the film essentially favorable, she argued that it is a "stalker's fantasy", citing Empoy Marquez's character to be downright sinister for "tak[ing] advantage" of De Rossi's character's blindness throughout. She said:

Why do we encourage persistence? Why isn't it enough when a woman says 'no' the first time? (And no, it's no different whether the guy in question is handsome or not). If Tonyo had really just happened to live across the street, approached Lea with no ulterior motives, and fallen in love with her, then it could have made for a beautiful film.

=== Unauthorized release ===
The film's complete version had been leaked on Facebook by the first week of August 2017. One of the site's registered users reportedly posted it on August 4, garnering almost 2,000 views and was subsequently shared 70 times at 3:40 p.m.; it got taken down the following day at exactly 5 a.m.. Production outfits Spring Films and Viva Films denounced the leak in a joint warning, while co-producer Piolo Pascual and director Sigrid Andrea Bernardo through Instagram and Facebook.

== Adaptation ==
Indonesia will have its own adaptation of the film and will be entitled as Cinta Itu Buta (transl. Love is Blind) with the film set in Busan, South Korea instead of in Japan. It premiered in Indonesian cinemas on October 10, 2019.

== Soundtrack ==
KZ Tandingan recorded a version of "Two Less Lonely People in the World", originally by Australian soft rock duo Air Supply from their 1982 album Now And Forever, which served as the theme song of the film. It was As of August 21, 2017, the cover has peaked at #2 spot of Billboard Philippines Hot 100 chart.
