= Darna (disambiguation) =

Darna is a fictional character created by Filipino comics writer Mars Ravelo.

Darna may also refer to:

- Darna (1951 film), a film starring Rosa del Rosario
- Darna (1991 film), a film starring Nanette Medved
- Darna (2022 TV series), a TV series starring Jane De Leon, and an upcoming film
- Darna (2005 TV series), a TV series starring Angel Locsin
- Darna (2009 TV series), a TV series starring Marian Rivera
  - Darna (album) (2001)
- Darna (moth), a moth genus of the family Limacodidae
- Darna, the belief in harmony and order in the Baltic neopaganism, corresponding roughly to dharma in Indic religions
- Darna, Nepal

== See also ==
- Derna, Libya
