= Valentina (Philippine comics) =

Supervillain in Filipino comics

Publication information
- Publisher: Ace Publications
- First appearance: Pilipino Komiks #78 (1950)
- Created by: Mars Ravelo (writer); Nestor Redondo (artist)

In-story information
- Species: Transformed human / Serpent-like race meld
- Place of origin: Philippines
- Team affiliations: Kobra (1950); Serpent Queens of Tiamat (2003)
- Partnerships: Kobra
- Notable aliases: The Serpent Queen; Goddess of Snakes
- Abilities: Gorgon physiology; Snake physiology; Snake manipulation; Enhanced thermal senses; Enhanced night vision; Fear inducement; Enhanced flexibility and agility; Enhanced stealth; Invulnerability; Enhanced strength; Limited telepathy

Valentina is a supervillain appearing in Philippine comic books, created by Mars Ravelo and Nestor Redondo. Based upon the eponymous Greek mythological figure, she first appeared in Pilipino Komiks (issue #78, 1950) and was the first adversary of the superhero Darna. Referred to as the "Goddess of Snakes", she has command over all kinds of serpents and has venomous snakes in her head instead of hair. She has been featured significantly as Darna's archenemy in many adaptations of her stories in other media.

Born in a rural scene, Valentina's origin story relates that she is the daughter of mortals Miguel and Doray. She was feared and hated by the town folks and the only man she ever loved, Edwardo, for her appearance. With the influence of the serpent creature Kobra, this drove her to become evil, murdered her parents and soon planned to destroy humankind by turning the world into a haven of reptiles. The character has changed in depiction over the decades. In Mango Comics' 2003 three-part issue, she was depicted as an extraterrestrial from the planet Tiamat disguised as her mortal alter-ego Amor. A pop culture icon, Valentina is often described as the most recognizable female supervillain in the Philippines.

== Publication history ==
=== Early years ===
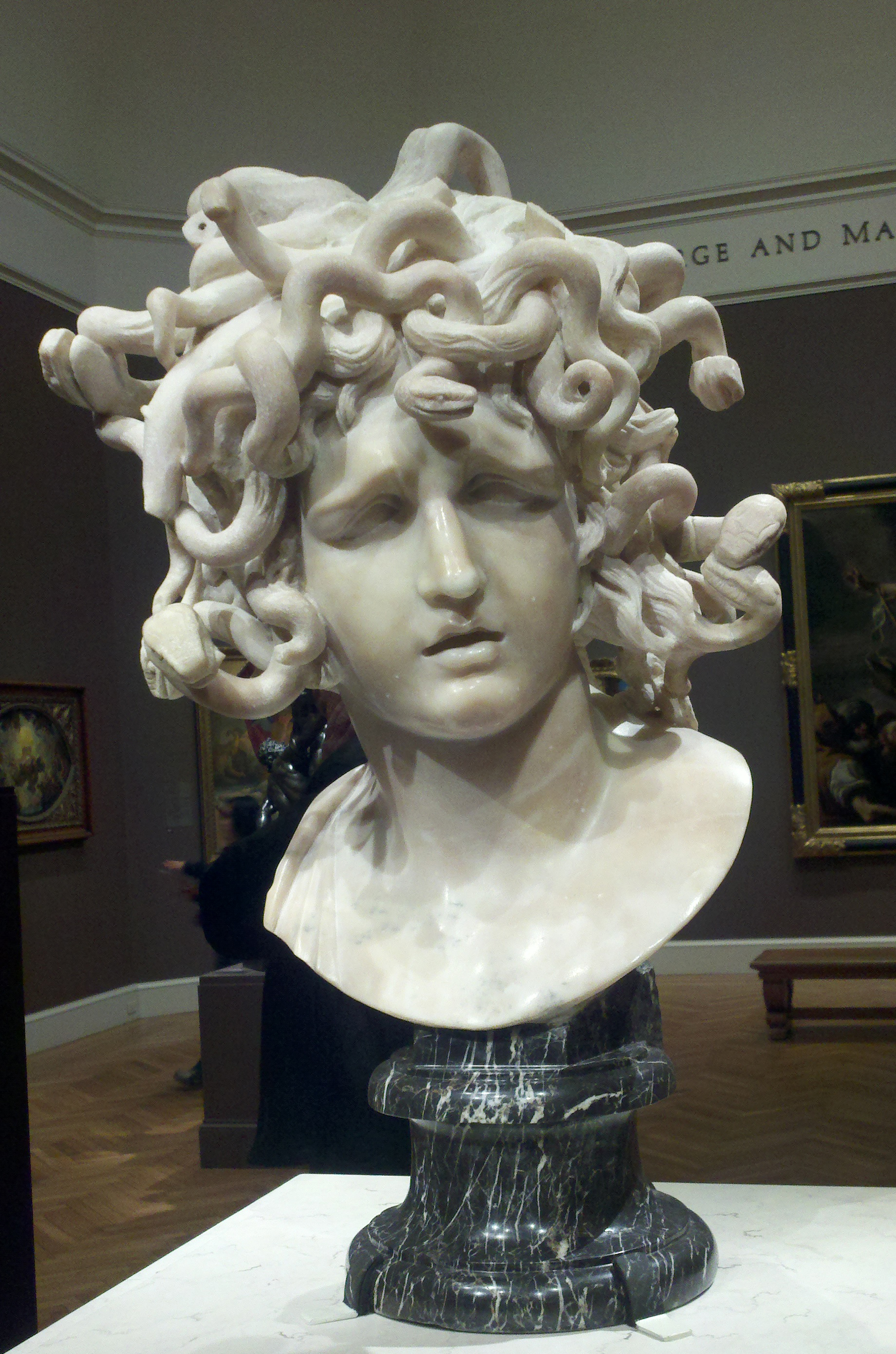
Medusa, a Gorgon in the Greek mythology, is an inspiration in creating the villainess character Valentina.

Valentina's debut in Philippine comics is in Pilipino Komiks #78 (1950), which is the second episode of the comics serial Darna by Mars Ravelo and Nestor Redondo that ran 28 episodes. She eventually became the archenemy of Darna. In creating Valentina, Ravelo drew inspiration from Medusa, a Gorgon in Greek mythology with living venomous snakes in place of hair. Valentina has venomous snakes in her hair, but she does not turn people into stone upon looking into her eyes unlike Medusa.

In her first appearance, Valentina was born from human parents named Miguel and Doray. Too many restrictions from her parents led Valentina to kill them with the help of her pet snake Vibora, beginning her journey onto the pathway of evil. Kobra, a creature with a python's body and hag's head, became Valentina's master. Valentina learns to control snakes to do her bidding, making her "goddess of the snakes". After Darna foiled her plan to turn the Earth into a world dominated by reptiles, Valentina commits suicide by jumping into a cliff where the bodies of her parents can be found.

=== Later years ===
In the late 1960s, Pablo S. Gomez created a comic novel entitled Valentina in Universal Komiks that was published by PSG Publication. The main character of the novel, Valentina, is associated with snakes and inspired by Ravelo's Valentina. Due to this comic novel, Valentina became a household name.

=== The Mango Comics miniseries ===
In the early 2000s, Mango Comics acquired the rights of Darna. With inputs from the family of Ravelo, in 2003, Mango Comics released a miniseries featuring Darna with Valentina as the main villainess. In this comics series that was written by Boboy Yonzon and illustrated by Ryan Orosco and Gilbert Monsanto, both Darna and Valentina came from the planet called Tiamat. Darna comes from a warrior race named Adarna that uses artificial wings and the comics clearly link the race's origin from the Adarna bird from early Filipino literature while Valentina comes from a rival race that resembles the Nāgas and Gorgons. In this version, Darna's alter-ego, Narda, is depicted as an ordinary college student. On other hand, Valentina is initially presented as a pop singer named Amor comparing her singing prowess to Britney Spears.

== Character background ==
Valentina's debut (Pilipino Komiks #81, July 1950). Art by Nestor Redondo.

Valentina is a serpent queen with a same likeness to the Gorgon Medusa of the Greek mythology, and with this, she has the ability to control all types of snake as well as communicate with them. One of her defining feature is her venomous snakes on her head that she uses to attack enemies and their bite is lethal just like a viper. As a snake goddess, she has an army of snakes that she uses to execute her plan to destroy humankind. She can also change in different forms.

Valentina usually has a pet snake and a mentor who teaches him to control snakes. She is normally depicted as a bitter woman who always seeks revenge. In other depictions, she is jealous with Narda's (Darna's alter ego) love interest and attempts to steal the man that Narda (or Darna) loves.

== In other media ==
=== Films ===
==== 1950s to 1970s ====
Cristina Aragon played the first Valentina role in the film Darna (1951), the very first film adaptation of Darna comics series. Twenty-two years later, in 1973, Valentina appeared as a doctoral degree graduate in herpetology from University of New Delhi in the film Lipad, Darna, Lipad!. Valentina's full name in this film is Dr. Valentina Vrandakapoor, Ph.D. and she wears a turban to hide the snakes on her head. Celia Rodriguez portrayed Valentina in this film and her depiction of the character, particularly the sequence where twelve real snakes cover her body while in bed, made her one of top actress to play Valentina as well as one of the top villain performers in the Philippines. The snakes on the head of Rodriguez were actually eels (Rodriguez referred to it as water snakes).

==== 1980s to 1990s ====
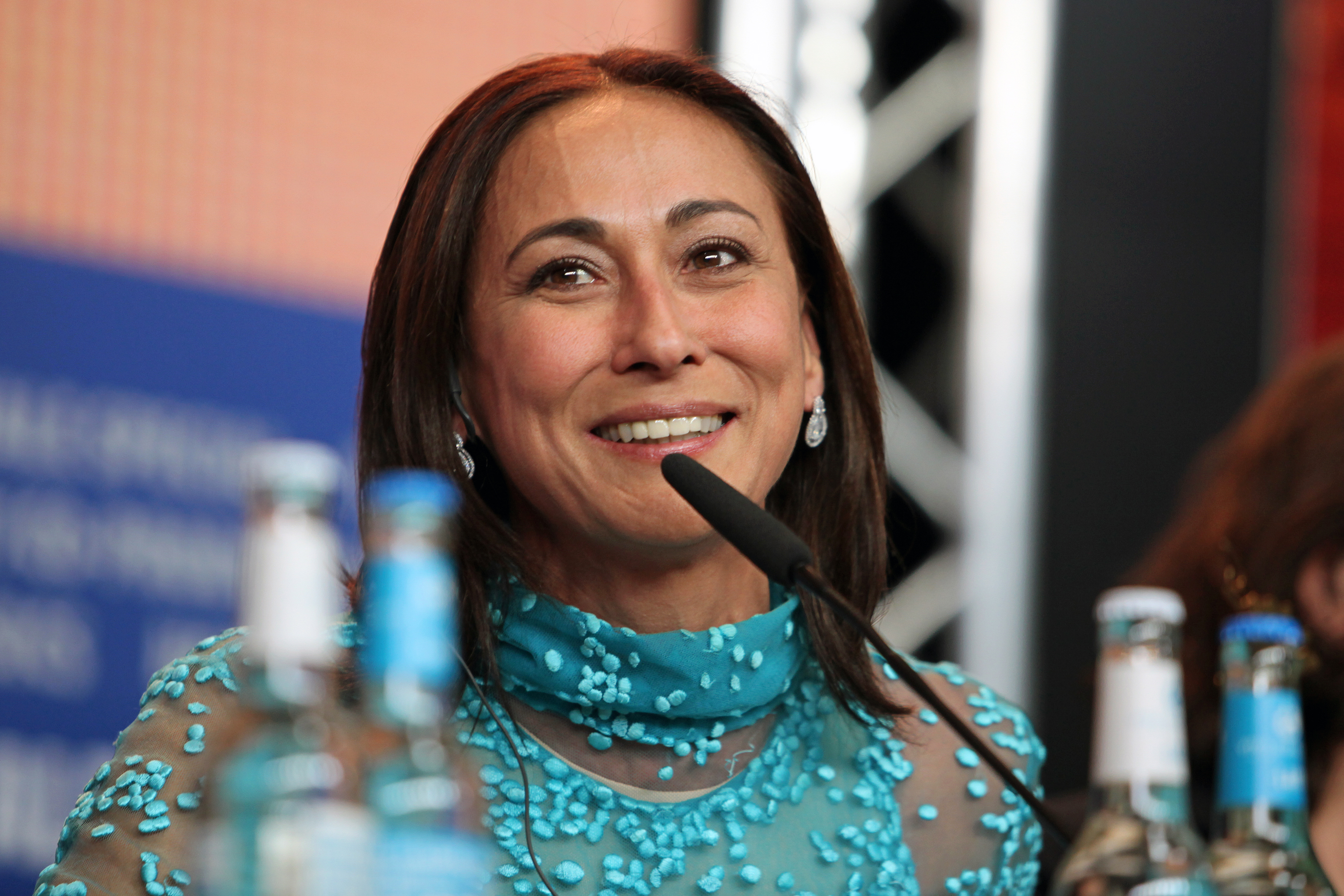
Cherie Gil was mistakenly cited in various sources as one of the actress who portrayed Valentina but actually played Valentina's daughter, Valentine, in the 1994 film Mars Ravelo's Darna! Ang Pagbabalik.

In 1989, a film was released by Lea Productions entitled Valentina, where Melissa Perez Rubio played the title role. In this film where Darna did not appear, Valentina is portrayed as a good person who was cursed with snakes on her head and has powers to turn people into stones at will unlike Medusa who makes people into stones through looking at her eyes. Rey "PJ" Abellana played Ariel, the love interest of Valentina, which was originally intended for Eric Quizon.

In the film 1991 film Darna, Pilar Pilapil portrayed Valentina. The film was criticized as campy and Valentina's look was negatively compared to Jacobim Mugatu of Zoolander while her pet snake Vibora was censured as a downgraded muppet with bright red lips. In another Darna film in the 1990s, Mars Ravelo's Darna! Ang Pagbabalik (1994), Pilita Corrales played Valentina where she has a daughter named Valentine (portrayed by Cherie Gil) who also has snakes on her head.

==== Future ====
After ABS-CBN got the film rights for Ravelo's characters in 2013, development of another Darna film has been in the works since 2014 by ABS-CBN's film production company, Star Cinema, with Angel Locsin reprising her role as Darna, although, full cast was not revealed including the actress who would portray Valentina. Erik Matti was the director of the film whose production company Reality Entertainment was co-producing the film. In 2015, Angel Locsin left the project for health reasons. Matti continued working on the project without revealing any details about the cast. Liza Soberano was announced to play Darna in 2017 and no other cast information was given. There were rumors circulating that Anne Curtis would portray Valentina in Soberano-led Darna film but she neither confirm or deny it. Other prospects of actresses who would be Valentina emerged including Venus Raj, Iza Calzado and Jessy Mendiola. In August 2018, Matti said that he already had actors for Ding and Valentina but he did not reveal who were them. In the same month he said this, Soberano had a fractured finger and in April 2019 she announced that she is quitting the project because of the injury.

ABS-CBN announced in October 2018 that Matti withdrew as director for the Darna film because of creative differences. A day after the announcement, it was revealed that Jerrold Tarog replaced Matti as the new director for the Darna film. With the departure of Soberano, Jane De Leon was unanimously picked as Darna among the 300 actresses who auditioned for the role. On the other hand, the coveted Valentina role has yet to be disclosed and several actresses expressed their desire to fulfill the role, most notably Denise Laurel. In addition to the other actresses who were rumored to be Valentina, it was speculated that the following actresses would be Valentina: Sarah Lahbati, Dimples Romana and Maricar Reyes.

=== Television shows ===
==== Darna (2005 TV series) ====
The very first appearance of Valentina in television is in the 2005 television series Darna by GMA Network where Alessandra de Rossi played Valentina while Angel Locsin portrayed Darna, which was first offered to Iza Calzado. About more than a decade later, Calzado was also considered to play Valentina in another Darna film. On the other hand, de Rossi had qualms in accepting the Valentina due to her fear of snakes but she was persuaded by the production team to take the role. She initially does not have snakes on her head but eventually had them on her final form. The series pilot which was aired on April 11, 2005, posted a 47.1% rating according to AGB Nielsen and the pilot episode was one of the highest rated in Philippine television.

Most of the plot and story elements of the 2005 Darna television series were lifted from the 2003 Darna comics miniseries published by Mango Comics since GMA Network inked a licensing deal with Mango Comics to adapt their comics version into television. In this adaptation, Narda and Valentina are cousins, but in the latter, they found out that they are twins. Efren (played by Dennis Trillo) is both the love interest of Valentina and Narda; Valentina will do anything to get him. Valentina changed to Ava (played by Nadine Samonte) in order for her to get Efren. Valentina was the Anomalkan who will kill the Queen of Anomalka, Braguda, according to the prophecy.

==== Darna (2009 TV series) ====
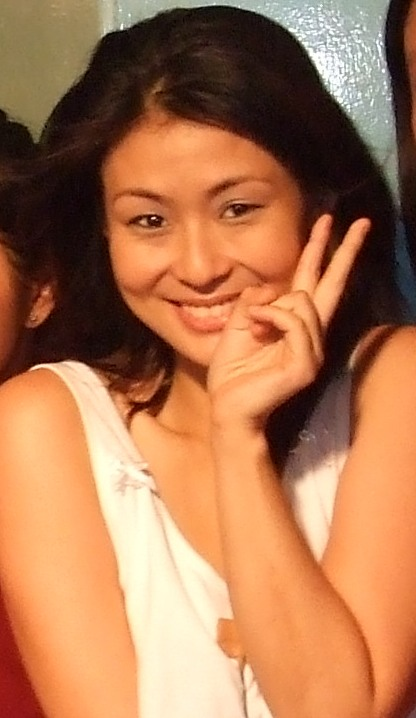
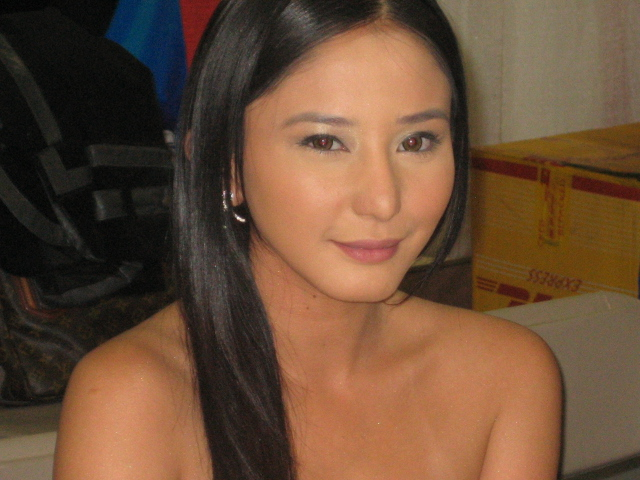
Iwa Moto (left) & Katrina Halili (right). Both played the role of Valentina/Serpina on Darna (2009 TV series).

GMA Network rebooted the Darna series once again in 2009 with Marian Rivera as Darna/Narda and Iwa Moto as Valentina. Moto was initially set to play the villain Babaeng Linta but it was changed and she got the role of Valentina. Katrina Halili was considered to play Valentina but she ended up with another villain, Serpina, the half-sister of Valentina. Although, it turned out that Serpina is actually Valentina. Halili also played a villain in the first Darna TV series in 2005 as the Black Darna. Moto's Valentina used to be the childhood friend of Narda and Eduardo (the love interest of Narda played by Mark Anthony Fernandez) until she becomes evil and the enemy of Darna; because of the serpents on her hair, she grew up as an outcast longing for love from her mother as well as Eduardo.

Valentina's powers in the 2009 Darna TV series played by Moto are superhuman strength, stamina, reflexes and the usual power in the comics, which is the control of snakes through a psychic bond. In addition, she has the ability to heal herself and can heal people who are sick as well as get rid of poisons or toxins from any person. Although, when her heart is injured, she cannot heal it. Valentina can also telepathically link herself to her half-sister, Serpina. Her superhuman strength can uproot trees and can match Darna's strength. In this series, Kobra (played by Paolo Contis) who is originally a female character in the comics is Valentina's father while her mother is an ordinary human named Consuelo (played by Janice de Belen).

==== Darna (2022 TV series) ====
Janella Salvador starred as Regina Vanguardia/Valentina in ABS-CBN's take on Mars Ravelo's Darna. Regina is depicted as a prolific lawyer and influencer with a soft spot for the underprivileged and the downtrodden but a monster hidden behind her strong façade. Her superpowers as the Serpent Queen, given to her by a green, crystal-like extra-terrestrial mineral called "Chrysalis", includes: enhanced regenerative healing factor (enabling her to recuperate, even from harm inflicted by Darna, rapidly overnight), flexibility and night vision. She also has five specific snakes among others that grows and extends to great sizes, which she uses for multiple purposes ranging from snaring her prey to reaching or traveling across fair distances. They are named Varda, Corra, Berlie, Mhokie and Shontong. This depiction is also a capable martial artist, and very limber that she is able to easily restrain her targets using body-to-body grappling moves and has even, on more than one occasion, subjected Darna herself into submission moves that the latter could not quickly escape from.

==== Other television shows ====
Jodi Sta. Maria starred as Valentina in an episode of ABS-CBN's Komiks television series in 2006 entitled "Komiks Presents: Valentina." The episode is an origin story and Valentina is presented as a good person like in the 1989 film Valentina. Another ABS-CBN television series, Wansapanataym, features Valentina again in one of its episode in 2010. Melissa Ricks got the role to play Valentina in this Wansapanataym episode and the story is also similar to the Komiks episode and the Valentina film where Valentina is presented as a cursed individual but with a good heart.

=== Theater ===
==== Pilipino Komiks ====
Before the Darna comics characters were adapted into the television medium, they had already appeared first in theater in 1993 where ballerina Lisa Macuja played Darna and Melanie Motus played Valentina in the musical stage play entitled Pilipino Komiks. This ballet stage production was presented by Philippine Ballet Theatre and featured characters made by Mars Ravelo in a comedic way. Almost a quarter a century later in 2017, this play that was first choreographed by Gener Caringal was re-staged again by Philippine Ballet Theatre and co-presented by Filipino Heritage Festival, National Commission for Culture and the Arts, AB Leisure and Philippine Amusement and Gaming Corporation. In this re-staging of Pilipino Komiks, Regine Magbitang played Darna while Loby Pimentel played Valentina. Both plays were performed in the Cultural Center of the Philippines; the second play additionally performed in Negros, Philippines.

==== Other stage plays ====
Another ballet stage play was produced in August 2003 by Ballet Philippines and presented at the Cultural Center of the Philippines. In this theater version, entitled Darna, Christine Crame and Kris-Belle Paclibar alternately danced and played the part of Darna while Valentina who sings was portrayed by Chin-Chin Gutierrez and Tex Ordoñez alternating between the schedule of the stage plays. This production is equally focused on both Darna and Valentina. With choreographic influences from American films such The Matrix and Crouching Tiger, Hidden Dragon, the theater play was directed by Chris Millado and choreographed by Denisa Reyes and Alden Lugnasin.

In May 2018, Ding, Ang Bato! that was presented by the Arts and Culture Cluster and the Dance Program of the School of Design and Arts of the De La Salle–College of Saint Benilde was a dance musical theatre that once more featured Darna and Valentina. Staged at School of Design and Arts Theater at De La Salle College of St. Benilde and directed also by Chris Millardo, the story is presented at the point-of-view of Ding (played alternately by Carlos Serrano, Juner Quiambao and John Peñaranda), the younger brother of Narda, who is born deaf in this version. Christine Crame reprised her role as Darna while role of Valentina went to Natasha Cabrera. In this version, Valentina is a sympathetic character and has an alter-ego named Tina that was played by Lea Roque.

== Powers and abilities ==
- Snake Control — She can talk to and command different kinds of snakes.
- Snake-like Flexibility — She can bend and twist her body at will, far beyond the natural limits of a human being.
- Night Vision — She can see well in the dark, similar to many species of snakes that are nocturnal predators.
- Superhuman Strength — She can lift massive debris, land vehicles and boulders, allowing her to overpower opponents with physical strength. She can become stronger over time, landing blows that could stagger Darna, who struggled to keep Valentina pinned down.
- Invulnerability — She is nearly immune to all man-made weapons.

In the 2005 version, Valentina could also shapeshift, copying the physical attributes of anyone, or transform from her human form to that of Valentina, or vice-versa. She uses this ability to trick her enemy.

The 2022 version also introduces new abilities:

- Enhanced Regeneration — Her rapid healing allows her to survive explosions and physical attacks from her enemies.
- Life-force Absorption — She can absorb health and vitality from her victims, leaving them either weakened or dead.
- Snake Tentacles — She has large snakes attached to her body. These can smother her victims to death or swallow them whole. She also uses them to scale walls and move from one place to another.

== Actresses who played Valentina ==
The following table lists all the actresses who portrayed Valentina as the main character as well as her alter-ego. It does not include actresses who portrayed Valentina as a result of possession or reincarnation. That information is available in the "Notes" section.

Valentina actresses
Year	Medium	Work title	Actress	Notes
1951	film	Darna	Cristina Aragon	The very first actress to play Valentina.
1973	film	Lipad, Darna, Lipad!	Celia Rodriguez	For the first time, the character got a full name (Dr. Valentina Vrandakapoor). Rodriguez's performance was regarded as the best depiction of Valentina.
1989	film	Valentina	Melissa Perez Rubio	Valentina is presented as a protagonist.
1991	film	Darna	Pilar Pilapil	Valentina's look on this film was criticized.
1993	theater	Pilipino Komiks	Melanie Motus	The very first musical dance theater adaptation of the character presented in a comedic way.
1994	film	Mars Ravelo's Darna! Ang Pagbabalik	Pilita Corrales	
2003	theater	Darna	Chin-Chin Gutierrez and Tex Ordoñez	Valentina's character sings in the ballet theater presentation where she and Darna were equally focused in the story.
2005	television	Darna	Alessandra de Rossi	The very first television adaptation of the character. Nadine Samonte played Ava in this series but her character was possessed by Valentina.
2006	television	Komiks Presents: Valentina	Jodi Sta. Maria	Valentina is featured in this Komiks episode as a good person as in the 1989 Valentina film.
2009	television	Darna	Iwa Moto	In this Darna reboot, Katrina Halili portrays Serpina, the half-sister of Valentina, but it turned out she is Valentina herself.
2010	television	Wansapanataym	Melissa Ricks	Similar to the Valentina film and the Komiks episode, Valentina is presented as a cursed person with snakes on her head but with a good heart.
2017	theater	Pilipino Komiks	Loby Pimentel	The play is a remake of the 1993 musical dance theater with the same name.
2018	theater	Ding, ang Bato!	Natasha Cabrera and Lea Roque	Cabrera played a sympathetic Valentina while Roque played Tina, the alter-ego of Valentina.
2022	television	Darna	Janella Salvador	In this 2022 version of Darna, Regina is Valentina's mortal alter-ego who is a lawyer and vlogger

== Collected editions ==
Title	Volume	Issue	Date
Darna	Pilipino Komiks	#2-16, #18-28	
Darna	Pilipino Komiks	#81	July 8, 1950
Darna	Pilipino Komiks	#87	September 30, 1950
Darna vs. Zumarna	Darna Komiks	#1217	August 17, 1992
Darna	Mango Comics miniseries	#1	February 28, 2003
Darna	Mango Comics miniseries	#2	May 7, 2003
Darna	Mango Comics miniseries	#3	December 13, 2003

== See also ==
- Regina Vanguardia
