= Hero City Kids Force =

2021 superhero animated short

- Genre: Superhero
- Written by: Nono Pardalis
- Directed by: Patrick Soriano
- Voices of: Rona Aguilar; Daryll Patco; Marick Dacanay
- Theme music composer: Ken Aoki; Kim Lopez
- Country of origin: Philippines
- Original language: Filipino
- No. of episodes: 13

Production
- Executive producers: Jojo Medalla; Chryssa Lipardo; Camille Regis
- Running time: 4 minutes
- Production companies: Monaural Studio; Tres Puntos Studio

Original release
- Network: iWantTFC
- Release: November 6, 2021 – January 29, 2022

Hero City Kids Force is a Philippine animated television series of shorts produced by ABS-CBN, Monaural Studio and Tres Puntos Studio. It aired on iWantTFC from November 6, 2021 to January 29, 2022. The series follows the adventures of the three superheroes: Darna, Captain Barbell, and Lastikman - as they band together with their playmates Maya, Andres, and Nono, also known as "The McCoolits".

== Premise ==
The superheroes and their friends go on missions to battle supervillain Dr. Sternberg, the evil genius responsible for creating monsters that wreak havoc in Hero City, and his sidekick Cyborgana.

== Cast and characters ==
Main cast

- Rona Aguilar as Darna
- Daryll Patco as Captain Barbell
- Marick Dacanay as Lastikman

Supporting cast

- Jefferson Utanes as Dr. Steinberg
- Romi Jallorina as Tita Joyce
- Jillian Ita-as Cyborgana
- Jewel Yu as Maya
- Santino Santiago as Andres
- Michelle Cornejo as Nono

== Release ==
=== Broadcast ===
From October 10, 2022 to June 3, 2023, the series had its Philippine TV premiere on A2Z, Kapamilya Channel, and Kapamilya Online Live (with next-day morning replays at 9:00 am) from Monday to Sunday before TV Patrol.

== Merchandise ==
Hero City Kids Force released official licensed merchandise including t-shirts and various toys for children available on Toy Kingdom and other online shopping stores.

== Awards and nominations ==
Year	Awards ceremony	Category	Winner(s)	Result	Ref.
2023	Asian Academy Creative Awards	Best Children’s Programme (One Off/Series)	Hero City Kids Force	Won	
2023	Anak TV Awards	Anak TV Seal (Television and Online Category)	Hero City Kids Force	Won	
