= Mars Ravelo's Darna! Ang Pagbabalik =

1994 superhero film by Peque Gallaga and Lore Reyes

- Restored movie poster
- Directed by: Peque Gallaga; Lore Reyes
- Written by: Floy Quintos
- Based on: Darna by: Mars Ravelo; Nestor Redondo
- Produced by: William C. Leary
- Starring: Anjanette Abayari; Edu Manzano; Rustom Padilla; Pilita Corrales; Bong Alvarez; Cherie Gil
- Cinematography: Marissa Floirendo
- Edited by: Danny Gloria
- Music by: Archie Castillo
- Production company: Viva Family Entertainment
- Distributed by: Viva Films
- Release date: June 9, 1994
- Running time: 104 minutes
- Country: Philippines
- Language: Filipino

Mars Ravelo's Darna! Ang Pagbabalik (lit. 'Mars Ravelo's Darna! The Return'), or simply Darna! Ang Pagbabalik, is a 1994 Filipino superhero film based on the Pilipino Komiks character Darna. Directed by Peque Gallaga and Lore Reyes from a screenplay by playwright Floy Quintos, it stars Anjanette Abayari as Narda / Darna, alongside Edu Manzano, BB Gandanghari (credited as Rustom Padilla), Bong Alvarez, Pilita Corrales, Cherie Gil and Lester Llansang. Produced by Viva Family Entertainment, the film was released on June 9, 1994.

As of 2023, it is the last Darna film to be released in theaters, with studios opting instead to produce television shows for the character of Darna in later years.

== Plot ==
After defeating a group of criminals who cause a lahar flow in her Darna persona, Narda returns home only to be knocked unconscious by a woman who steals the white stone that transforms her into Darna. She is rescued from rising lahar by Ding and her grandmother, but loses her sanity as she and her fellow villagers flee to Manila. Arriving at a slum community, Narda's family settles in with former villager Pol, who teaches them how to make a living and defends Narda from a group of thugs led by syndicate leader Magnum.

While accompanying Ding in selling goods, Darna is hit by a car carrying Dr. Valentine, the charismatic leader of a doomsday cult warning of an upcoming flood. Ding tries to intervene but is pinned down by Valentine's chauffeur to the car window, where he sees the White Stone inside. Deducing that Valentine has the stone, Ding, Narda and a neighbor, Pia, sneak into Valentine's lair during a prayer rally and discovers the stone powering Valentine's mother, Valentina. When Ding takes the stone, Valentina awakens and deteriorates while holding Ding hostage, prompting the latter to throw the stone to Narda and tell her to transform to Darna, helping recover her sanity. Darna escapes with Ding, while Valentine agonizes as her mother deteriorates into a hideous creature.

Fully recovered, Narda thwarts Magnum during a bank heist and saves Max, a police officer who falls in love with Narda from a bomb explosion, unaware that he is Magnum's alter-ego. Meanwhile, Narda's grandmother falls for Valentine's sermons and joins her cult, unaware that Valentine and Valentina is plotting to use the flood to take over the city. During a frenzied prayer rally led by Narda's grandmother, Max deduces that Narda is Darna and abducts her.

On the scheduled day of the flood, Valentine uses her powers to generate a storm that inundates Manila. Pol and Ding infiltrate Valentine's lair and discover Narda imprisoned, along with Valentine and Magnum worshipping Valentina, who uses the White Stone to recover her strength. After a prolonged fight, Ding shoots the White Stone into Valentina, who explodes after inadvertently swallowing it. Narda then takes the stone and transforms into Darna, throwing Magnum, who assumes the form of a python, into a fire. Valentine flees but is discovered in her true monstrous form by her followers, leading them to abandon her. At the rooftop, Darna engages Valentine in a fistfight before lifting her up into the air and throwing her into the floodwaters. Darna then uses her powers to drain the floods away, saving the city.

== Cast ==
- Anjanette Abayari as Narda/Darna
- Edu Manzano as Max
- Rustom Padilla as Pol
- Bong Alvarez as Magnum
- Pilita Corrales as Valentina
- Cherie Gil as Valentine/ Dra. Adan, daughter of Valentina
- Lester Llansang as Ding
- Ai-Ai delas Alas as hostage
- Eva Ramos as L300 noisy mother
- Pen Medina as barangay captain
- Jemanine Campanilla as Pia
- Romy Romulo as Valentine's driver
- Jun Achaval as a pilot
- Dwight Gaston as a pilot
- Jinky Laurel as bank teller
- Chiqui Xeres Burgos as governor
- Bong Regala as army lieutenant

== Production ==
Anjanette Abayari was cast for the role of Darna after she appeared in an automobile commercial dressed as the character alongside Alma Concepcion and Daisy Romualdez. The film is director Erik Matti's first production in the local film industry, serving as the continuity supervisor.

== Home media ==
Darna! Ang Pagbabalik was released on DVD in Hong Kong by My Way Film Co. on September 27, 2002. The film is currently made available for streaming by Viva Communications on Vivamax.
