= Darna vs. the Planet Women =

- Directed by: Armando Garces
- Written by: Armando Garces
- Based on: Darna by: Mars Ravelo; Nestor Redondo
- Starring: Vilma Santos; Rosanna Ortiz; Eva Linda; Lita Vasquez; Lieza Zobel; Diana Villa; Zandro Zamora; Bentot Jr.
- Cinematography: Amado "Botong" de Guzman
- Edited by: Efren Jarlego
- Music by: Carding Cruz
- Production company: Tagalog Ilang-Ilang Production
- Release date: December 25, 1975
- Running time: 102 minutes
- Country: Philippines
- Language: Filipino

Darna vs. the Planet Women is a 1975 Filipino superhero film based on the Pilipino Komiks character Darna. Written and directed by Armando Garces, it is the third Darna film to star Vilma Santos in the title role, and the ninth Darna film overall. The film also stars Rosanna Ortiz as the villain Elektra, alongside Zandro Zamora, Bentot Jr., Eva Linda, Lita Vasquez, Lieza Zobel and Diana Villa. The plot concerns Darna's quest to stop the alien Elektra of the planet Arko from leading an invasion of Earth with her female army. Produced by Tagalog Ilang-Ilang Production, Darna vs. the Planet Women was released on December 25, 1975.

Critic Justino Dormiendo of Sagisag panned the film for its patchwork quality comparable to a school play and "laughable" special effects. The Darna series continued with Bira! Darna, Bira! in 1979, with Rio Locsin taking over the lead role, while Santos returned for a final time in 1980's Darna and Ding.

== Cast ==
- Vilma Santos as Narda / Darna
- Rosanna Ortiz as Elektra
- Zandro Zamora as Ramon
- Bentot Jr. as Ding
- Eva Linda as Orang
- Lita Vasquez as Kara
- Lieza Zobel
- Diana Villa as Noche
- Joe Sison
- Virginia Montes
- Veronica Palileo as Narda's grandmother
- Paquito Salcedo
- Pons de Guzman
- Steve Alcarado
- Leon Pajaron
- Nestor Rueda
- Max Rojo
- Kristy Kintanar
- Romy Luartes
- Joseph Jardinazo
- Jimmy Dela Fuente
- Luciano Prieto
- The Tanay Boys

Television personality Ronnie Henares has an uncredited cameo appearance in the film.

== Release ==
Darna vs. the Planet Women was released in theaters on December 25, 1975.

=== Home media ===
Manila Trigon Video released the film on home video in 1987.

== Critical response ==
Justino Dormiendo, writing for Sagisag, gave the film an extremely negative review, unfavorably comparing the film's stitched-together quality to a grade school play and stated that "it should not be called a film but instead a bad dream." He further criticized the film's "laughable" ("katawa-tawa") special effects such as Darna's flying scenes and a flying saucer that "looks like a large piece of wood painted white", as well as the supposedly poor family of Narda looking too healthy.

== See also ==
- Sino ang Maysala?
