= Magdusa Ka =

2008 Philippine television drama series

- Title card
- Also known as: Misery
- Genre: Drama
- Based on: Magdusa Ka (1986) by Pablo S. Gomez
- Written by: Aloy Adlawan
- Directed by: Maryo J. de los Reyes
- Starring: Katrina Halili; Dennis Trillo; Iwa Moto
- Theme music composer: Tata Betita
- Opening theme: "Kahit Magdusa" by Luke Mejares
- Country of origin: Philippines
- Original language: Tagalog
- No. of episodes: 80

Production
- Executive producer: Camille Gomba-Montaño
- Camera setup: Multiple-camera setup
- Running time: 25–35 minutes
- Production company: GMA Entertainment TV

Original release
- Network: GMA Network
- Release: May 12 – August 29, 2008

Magdusa Ka (transl. you suffer / international title: Misery) is a 2008 Philippine television drama series broadcast by GMA Network. Based on a 1986 Philippine film of the same title, the series is the eighth instalment of Sine Novela. Directed by Maryo J. de los Reyes, it stars Katrina Halili, Dennis Trillo and Iwa Moto. It premiered on May 12, 2008 on the network's Dramarama sa Hapon line up. The series concluded on August 29, 2008, with a total of 80 episodes.

== Cast and characters ==
Cast

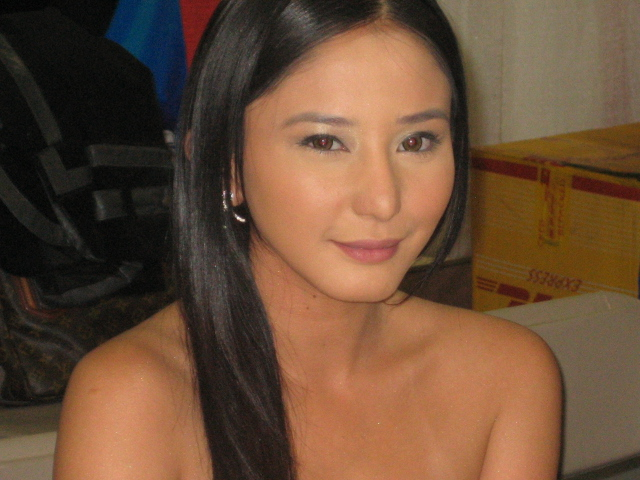
Katrina Halili

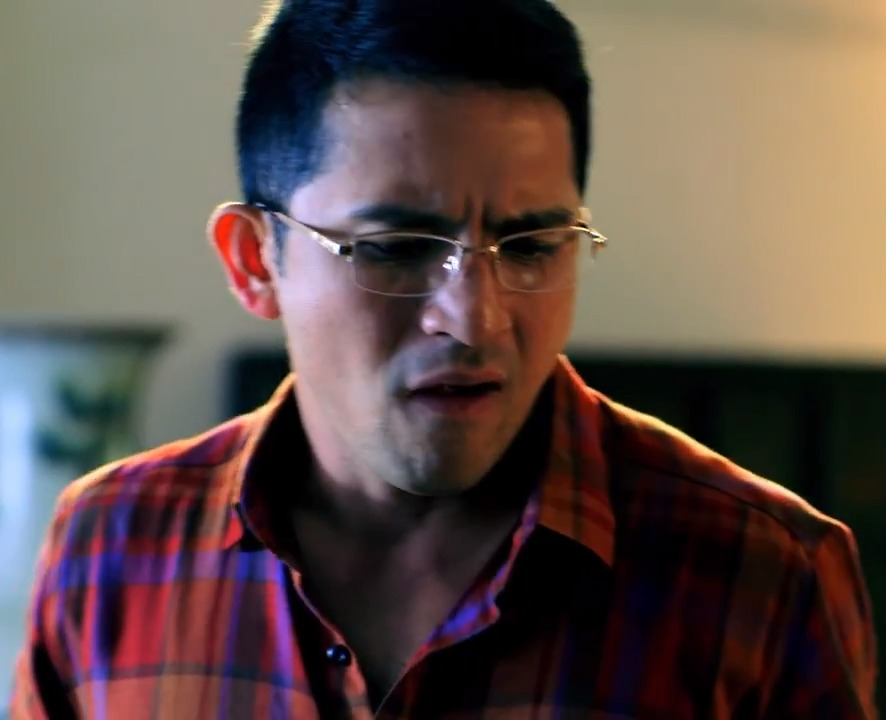
Dennis Trillo

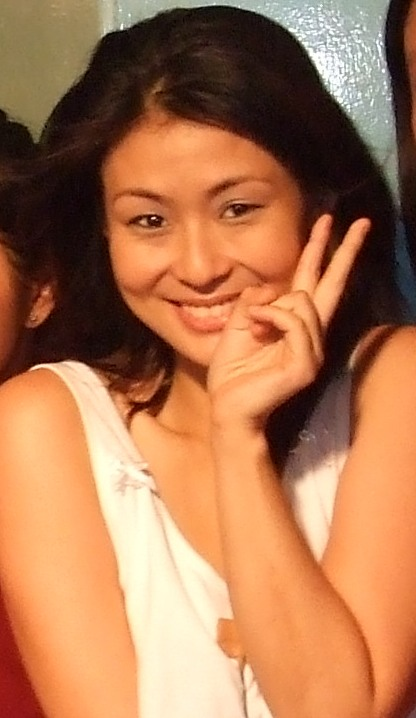
Iwa Moto

Lead cast

- Katrina Halili as Christine Salvador Doliente-Henson
- Dennis Trillo as Rodolfo "Rod" Henson
- Iwa Moto as Millet Calpito

Supporting cast

- Rita Avila as Victoria "Toyang" Salvador
- Gardo Versoza as Bernardo Doliente
- Liza Lorena as Perla Doliente
- Jackie Lou Blanco as Olivia Doliente
- Ana Capri as Hedy
- Emilio Garcia as Gerry Henson
- Gabby Eigenmann as Roland Henson
- Rich Asuncion as Violy
- Prince Stefan as Sonny
- Luz Valdez as Bebang

Guest cast

- Deborah Sun as Amanda
- Anton Bernardo as Victor
- Karla Estrada as Metring
- Blue Mark Roces as James
- Shirley Dalton as Lani

== Ratings ==
According to AGB Nielsen Philippines' Mega Manila household television ratings, the pilot episode of Magdusa Ka earned a 24.3% rating. The final episode scored a 24% rating.

== Accolades ==
Accolades received by Magdusa Ka
Year	Award	Category	Recipient	Result	Ref.
2009	37th International Emmy Awards	Best Telenovela	Magdusa Ka	Nominated	
