= Darna (1951 film) =

- Theatrical release poster
- Directed by: Fernando Poe
- Story by: Mars Ravelo
- Based on: Darna by Mars Ravelo and Nestor Redondo
- Produced by: Fernando Poe
- Starring: Rosa del Rosario; Mila Nimfa; Cristina Aragon
- Music by: Constancio de Guzman
- Production company: Royal Productions
- Release date: May 31, 1951
- Running time: 90 minutes
- Country: Philippines
- Language: Filipino

Darna is the first film featuring the Pilipino Komiks character Darna. The film was released on May 31, 1951, by Royal Films. It was directed by Fernando Poe Sr. and written by Mars Ravelo, the creator of Darna. Long thought to be entirely lost, Howie Severino and his crew from i-Witness discovered in 2005 an incomplete copy of the film in Thailand lasting 40 minutes, with audio removed, and only featuring scenes of the villain Valentina.

== Cast ==
- Rosa del Rosario as Darna
- Mila Nimfa as Narda
- Cristina Aragon as Valentina
- Manuel Ubaldo as Ding
- Elena Mayo
- Ben Perez
- Leonora Ruiz
