= Darna (2009 TV series) =

Philippine television drama series

- Title card
- Genre: Action drama; Fantasy
- Based on: Darna by Mars Ravelo and Nestor Redondo
- Developed by: Jun Lana
- Written by: Denoy Navarro-Punio; R.J. Nuevas; Renato Custodio
- Directed by: Dominic Zapata; Don Michael Perez
- Creative director: Jun Lana
- Starring: Marian Rivera
- Theme music composer: Jay Contreras
- Opening theme: "Narda" by Kamikazee
- Country of origin: Philippines
- Original language: Tagalog
- No. of episodes: 140

Production
- Executive producer: Edlyn Tallada-Abuel
- Production locations: Manila, Philippines
- Cinematography: Roman Theodossis; Rhino Vidanes
- Camera setup: Multiple-camera setup
- Running time: 30–45 minutes
- Production company: GMA Entertainment TV

Original release
- Network: GMA Network
- Release: August 10, 2009 – February 19, 2010

Related
- Darna (2005); Darna (2022)

Darna is a Philippine television drama action fantasy series broadcast by GMA Network. The series is based from Mars Ravelo's Philippine superheroine of the same title. Directed by Dominic Zapata and Don Michael Perez, it stars Marian Rivera in the title role. It premiered on August 10, 2009, on the network's Telebabad line up. The series concluded on February 19, 2010, with a total of 140 episodes.

== Cast and characters ==
Cast

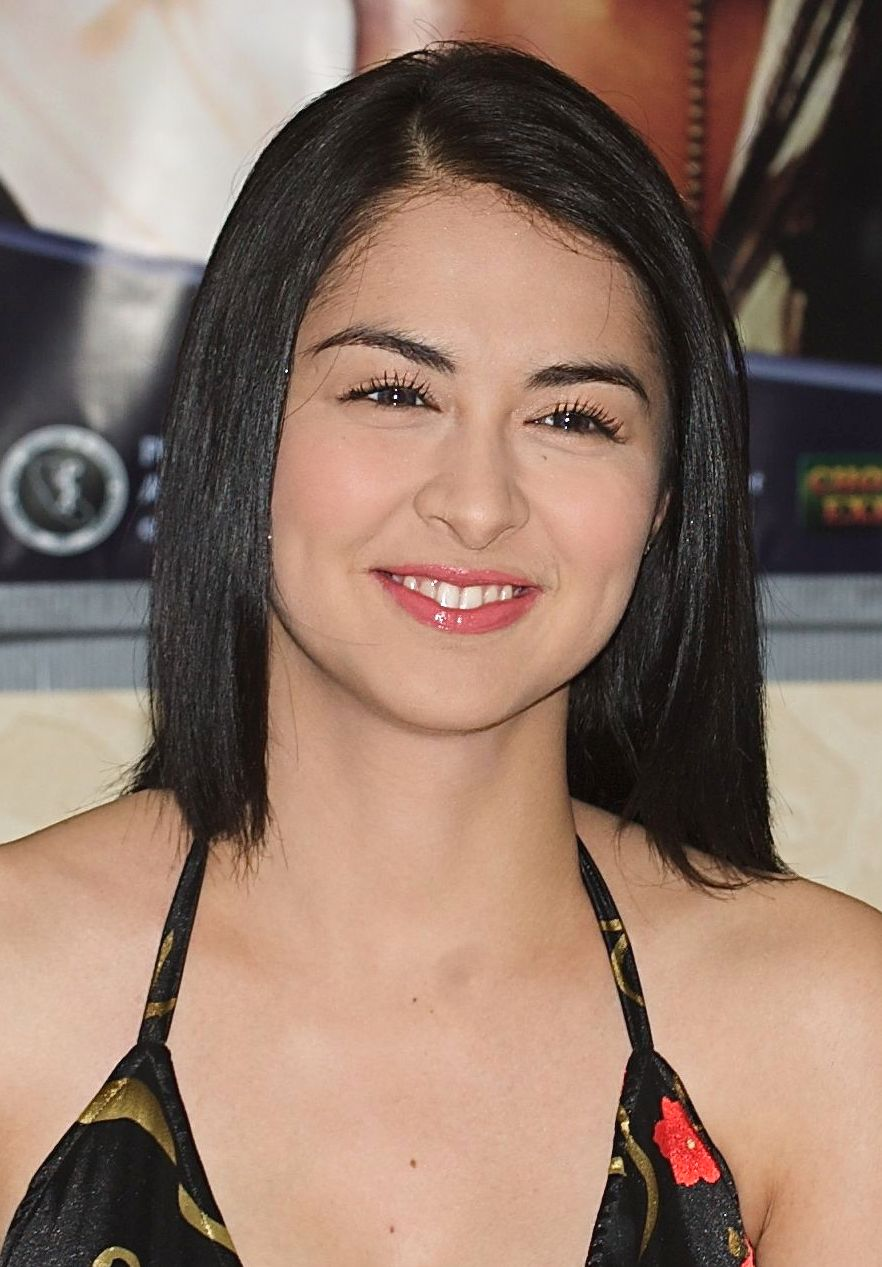
Marian Rivera

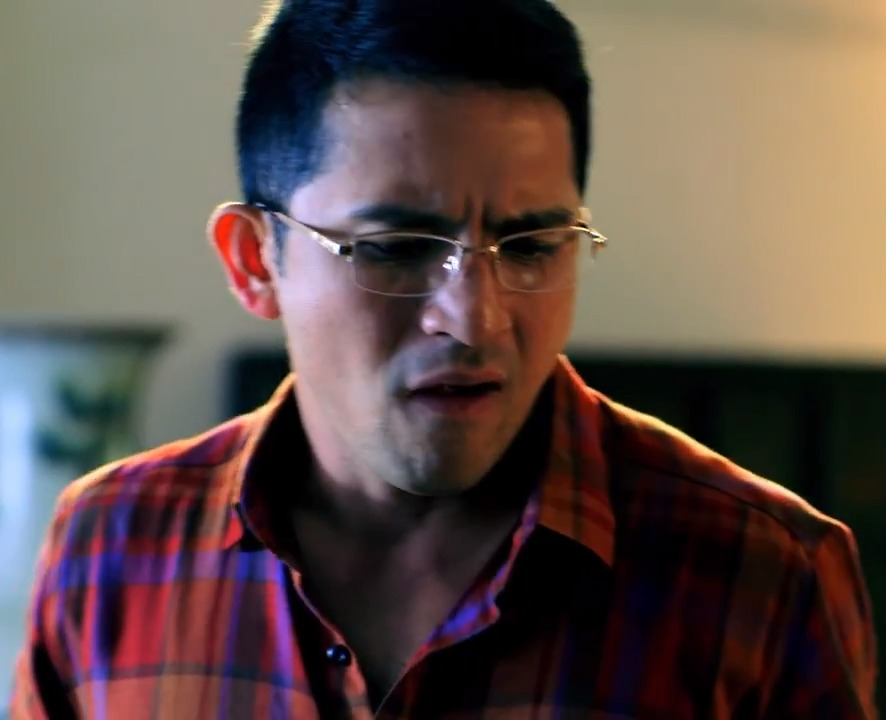
Dennis Trillo

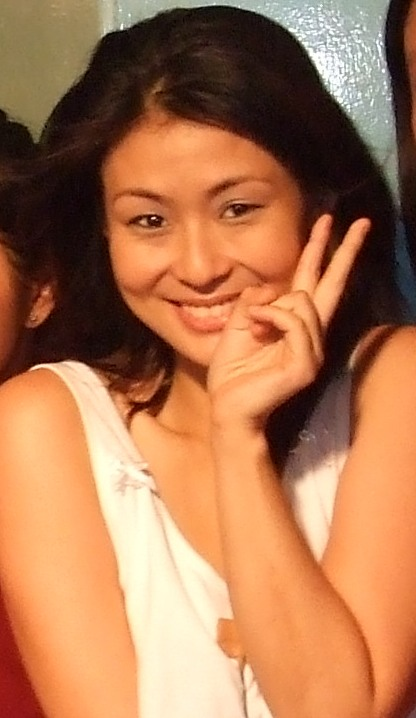
Iwa Moto

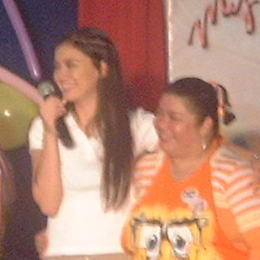
Nadine Samonte (left)

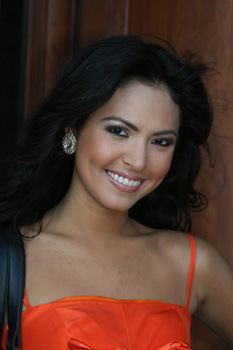
Maggie Wilson

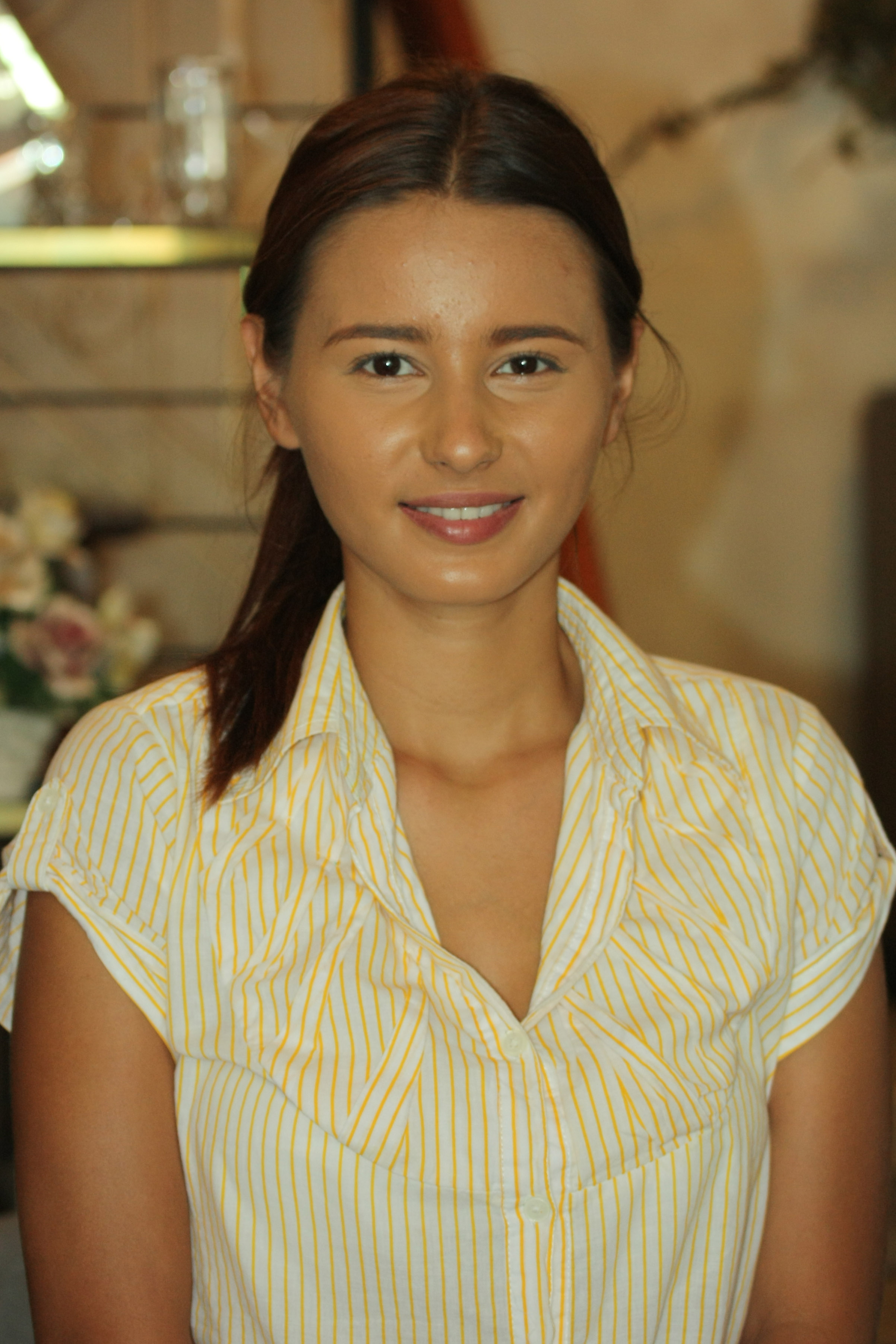
Jackie Rice

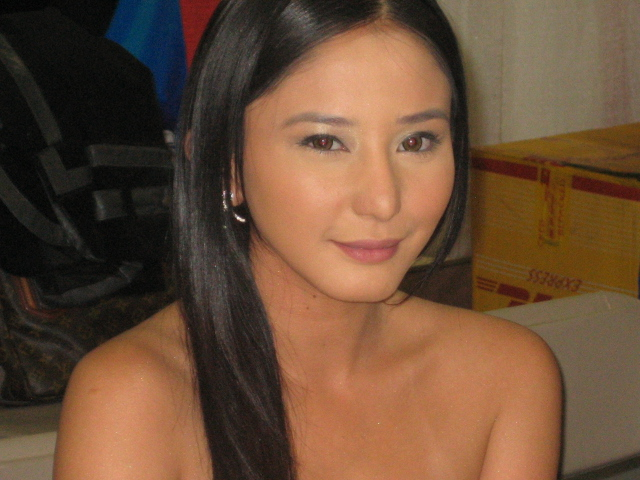
Katrina Halili

Lead cast

- Marian Rivera as Narda / Darna / Evil Darna / Ex-O / Phoenix

Supporting cast

- Mark Anthony Fernandez as Eduardo / Black Rider
- Dennis Trillo as Pancho
- Iwa Moto as Valentina
- Nadine Samonte as Roma / Babaeng Impakta
- Ehra Madrigal as Armida / Babaeng Lawin
- Francine Prieto as Lucifera / Babaeng Tuod
- Maggie Wilson as Octavia Moran / Lutgarda Morales / Babaeng Linta
- Rochelle Pangilinan as Deborah Santos
- Jackie Rice as Helena / Helga
- Roxanne Barcelo as Aleli
- Buboy Villar as Carding "Ding" Santos
- Rufa Mae Quinto as Francesca
- Raymart Santiago as Crisanto
- Alfred Vargas as Gabriel
- Krista Kleiner as Liberty
- Polo Ravales as Shiro

Guest cast

- Akihiro Sato as Vladimir
- Maureen Larrazabal as Dina Arcilla
- Katrina Halili as Serpina / Valentina
- Paolo Contis as Kobra
- Regine Velasquez as Elektra
- Angel Aquino as Darna
- Caridad Sanchez as Loleng
- Celia Rodriguez as Perfecta
- Mike "Pekto" Nacua as Jerry
- John Feir as Tomas
- Eddie Garcia as Mateo
- Ricky Davao as Morgan
- Gabby Eigenmann as Apollo
- Bearwin Meily as Watson
- Renz Valerio as younger Eduardo
- Jestoni Alarcon as Simon
- Rita Avila as Alicia
- Angeli Nicole Sanoy as younger Narda
- John Apacible as Nestor
- Janice de Belen as Consuelo
- Sweet Ramos as younger Valentina
- Allan "Mura" Padua as Impy
- Sabrina Man as younger Serpina
- Hayden Kho as Danny
- Ella Guevara as Narda

== Production ==
Rivera trained in martial arts in preparation for her role. Principal photography commenced on July 10, 2009.

== Reception ==
=== Ratings ===
According to AGB Nielsen Philippines' Mega Manila household television ratings, the pilot episode of Darna earned a 44.1% rating. The final episode scored a 32.9% rating.

=== Critical response ===
Writer Nestor Torre of Philippine Daily Inquirer said the pilot episode is "loud and livid". Torre also stated "two performances stand out because they're 'different'. The first is Janice de Belen's portrayal of Consuelo, the mother of Valentina. De Belen's characterization is outstanding, because it's deeply felt, while not being over-the-top..." and "the other interesting performance thus far is turned in by Iwa Moto as Valentina. With some help from creative scripting, her character is more tragic and conflicted than past versions of the story had it".
