= Katrina Halili =

Filipino actress and model (born 1986)

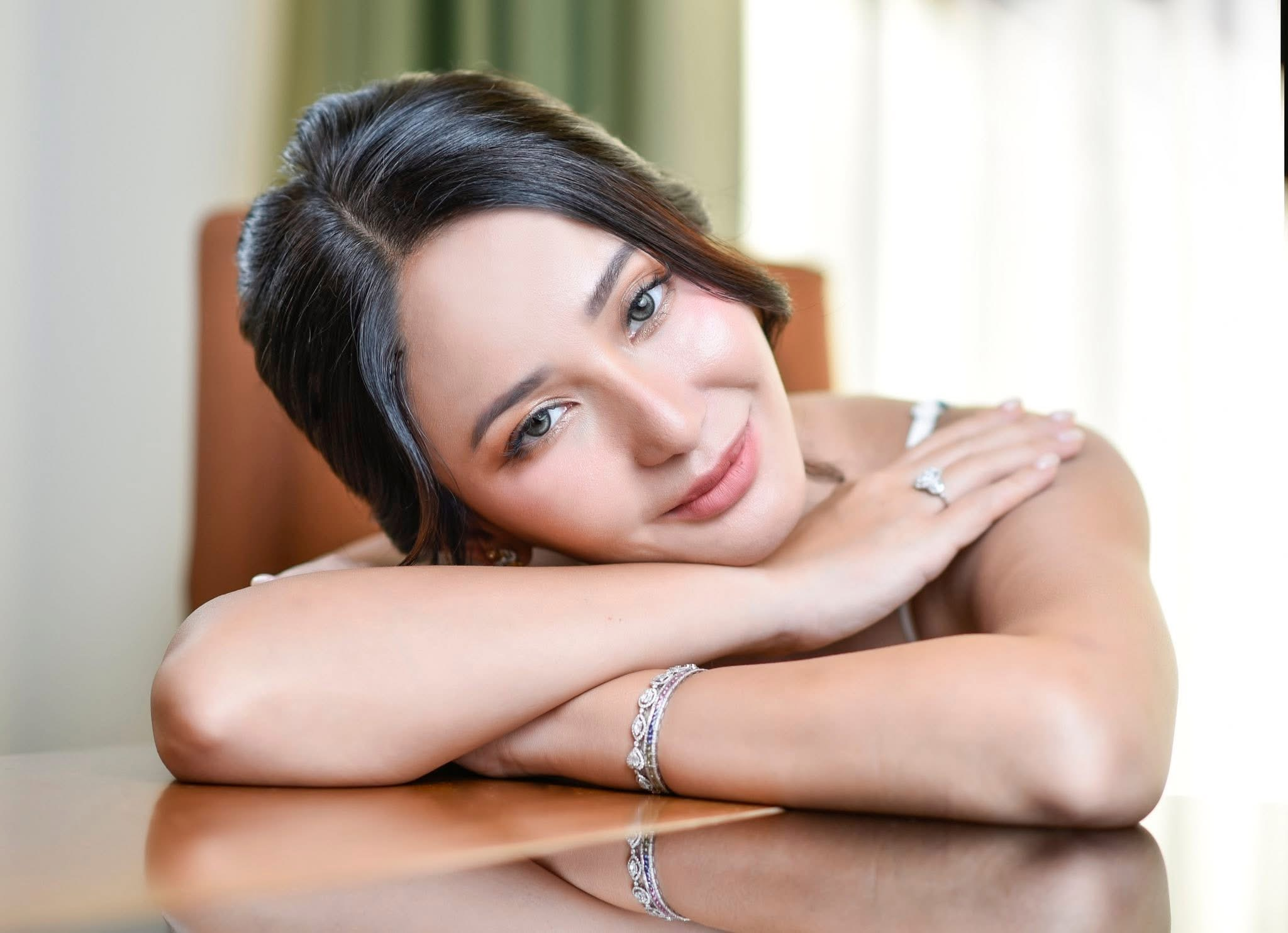
- Halili in 2026
- Born: Maria Katrina Irene Grace Morales-Halili; January 4, 1986 (age 40); Quezon City, Metro Manila, Philippines
- Occupation: Actress
- Years active: 2003–present
- Agent: Sparkle
- Children: 1

Maria Katrina Irene Grace Morales-Halili (born January 4, 1986) is a Filipino actress. She began her career after finishing as a finalist on the reality talent search StarStruck (2003). She was the first Filipina to be named by FHM Philippines as the world's sexiest woman twice, in 2006 and 2008. Her performances in Darna (2005 & 2009), Majika (2006), Marimar (2007), the International Emmy nominated Magdusa Ka (2008), Destiny Rose (2015), Sa Piling ni Nanay (2016), The Stepdaughters (2018), Prima Donnas (2019), Unica Hija (2022), and Mommy Dearest (2025) established her as one of the leading actresses in soap operas, mostly portraying antagonist roles. In 2024, Halili won Best Supporting Actress at the Emirates Film Festival for her role in AbeNida (2023).

== Early life and background ==
Katrina Halili was born and raised in El Nido, Palawan, the hometown of her mother. Her father is from Cabanatuan, Nueva Ecija.

Katrina Halili is an alumna of the StarStruck talent search and the cover girl of magazines such as FHM and Maxim Philippines. She was voted as FHM Philippines' sexiest woman for the year 2006 and in 2007. She is the first StarStruck contestant to top the FHM Philippines' 100 Sexiest list and the first Filipina celebrity to have won the title twice in a row. She is a four-time FHM covergirl (2005, 2006, 2008 and 2015). With 123,000 votes, she placed 2nd in 2008.

She gave birth to her daughter named Katrence Lawrence Halili Cadevid by Kris Lawrence on September 18, 2012.

She is co-parenting Lawrence's second child Lyric Lawrence (with a non-showbiz girlfriend) born on October 4, 2019. Halili's non-showbiz partner Jeremy G. Guiab, former vice mayor of Wao, Lanao del Sur succumbed to a heart attack at age 53 on January 29, 2024.

== Career ==
=== 2003–2008: Career beginnings ===
Halili started her first soap drama way back 2004 (Forever in My Heart) where she played Janelle Bernabe, the antagonist to the character of Jennylyn Mercado. Since then she played supervillain roles in two famous GMA fantaserye, Darna and Majika. In April 2007, she was one of the main cast in Lupin, where she played a good character, Ashley Calibre. However the same year she was pulled out from the show to play the famous villainous role of Senyora Angelika Santibañez in the remake of Marimar, but the character was changed into a young who will compete with Marimar for Sergio's love and extremely ruthless character, this is also her first pure evil role as she killed many people in the series compared to her past roles as she only committed attempted murder. This made Katrina more famous as she was given her first lead role after Marimar this was the 2008 Magdusa Ka, she portrayed Christine, a headstrong waitress and prostitute who turns out to be a rich lass but was opposed by the evil Millet (played by Iwa Moto). Katrina said she was challenge for her new role because she always played heartless characters in the past.

In the same year, she was given another lead role in Gagambino. But in May 2009, she was involved in a controversy surrounding a leaked video of her then partner, forcing her to temporarily go on hiatus from the showbiz industry. In June 2009, she returns to acting to play the villain role of Fedra Perez in Rosalinda.

=== 2009–2010: Darna, Langit sa Piling Mo, Beauty Queen ===
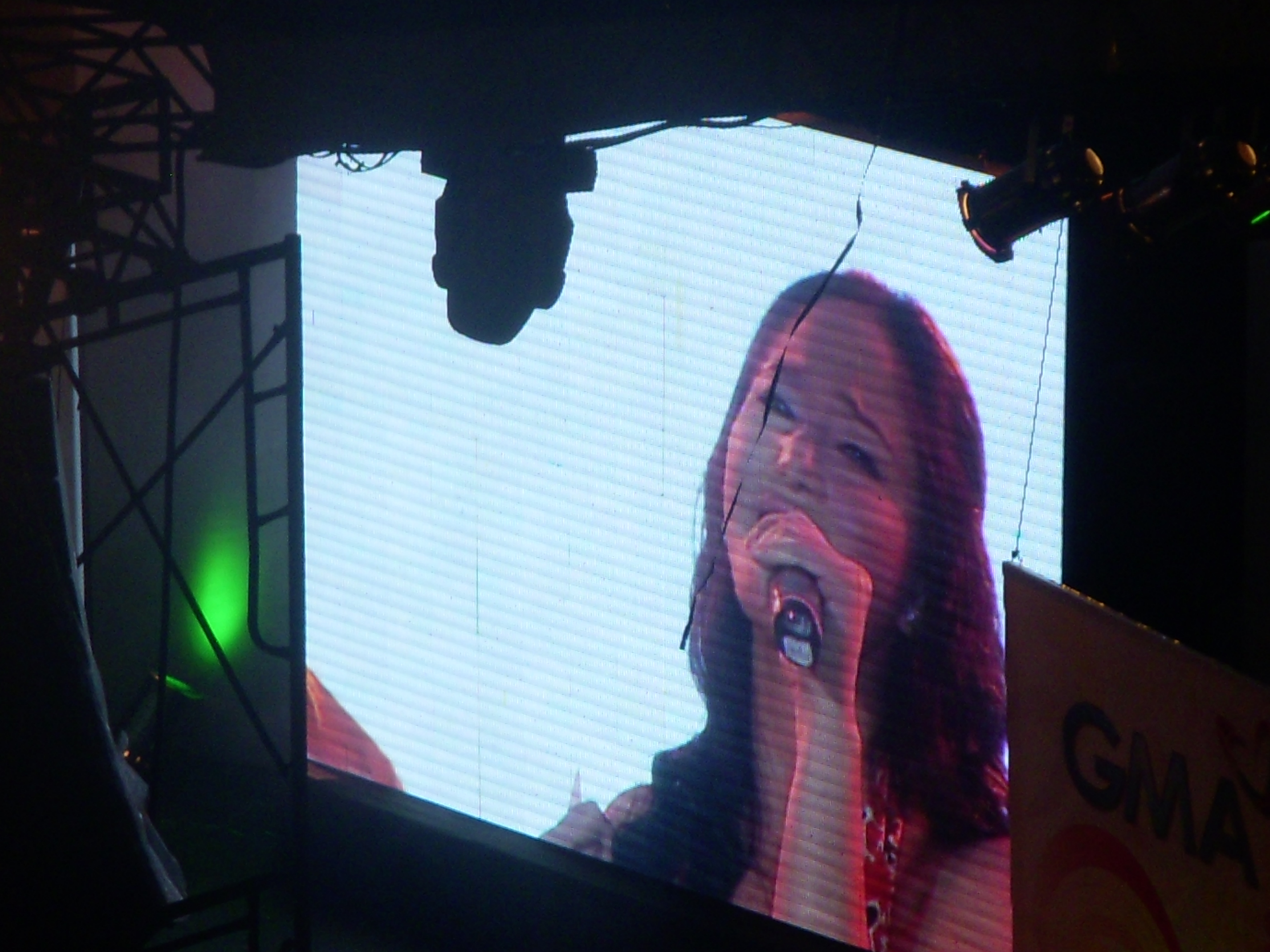
Halili performing at the Panagbenga Festival in 2009

In 2009, Halili was given another antagonist role in Darna, she played Serpina, a snake woman and one of the primary rival of Darna. Next is Langit sa Piling Mo, she played another main antagonist role as the scheming and manipulative Aurora. She later played an antagonist role in Beauty Queen. In Kaya ng Powers, she played an ex-syndicate member.

=== 2011–2012: Continued success ===
In 2011, she rose to fame again as she played the role of Lynette in Munting Heredera, again she is the main antagonist of the series but later was killed. In 2012, she once again played a villain role as Emmie in My Beloved. She reunited with Marimar (2007) lead casts, Marian Rivera and Dingdong Dantes. Halili's character in this series is similar to her obsessed and murderous Angelika character in 2007 Marimar. However Halili and Rivera has another feud when Katrina started tweeting, she wanted to kill Emmie's character because someone is insecure and hateful to her. She said that this person also hated her five years ago.

=== 2013–present: Villainous and protagonist roles ===
In 2013, Halili played two main antagonist roles in two TV series, in Indio, she played the goddess of greed who wanted to kill the protagonist of the series. Another series is Magkano Ba ang Pag-ibig?, she played Margot, the scheming and hard-hearted sister of Lualhati who killed her mother out of anger, she also hated Eloisa.

In 2014, she played a protagonist role, a good character role in Niño as Hannah. In 2015, she played a villain role in The Rich Man's Daughter. Later Katrina Halili played the main villain role as Jasmine in Destiny Rose, Jasmine is the evil cousin of Joey who made his life miserable as hell. In the finale episode Jasmine tried to kill Joey/Destiny Rose by burning him but failed.

Later in 2016, Halili played another main antagonist role in Sa Piling ni Nanay as Scarlet, the socialite evil mother of Katherine who tried to kill Ysabel and even her daughter as a revenge. Scarlet is the one who killed Matilda and many characters. She is also the source of Ysabel's misfortune. She is a wicked mother as she uses her daughter to usurp the Mercado family's wealth and never loved Katherine.

In 2017, Halili played another main antagonist role in D' Originals as Yvette, the social climber sexy-tary-turned-mistress of Lando who tried to kill Lando and Josie because of her vengeance. Although Yvette is the one who started the fight as she uses Lando to usurp his wealth and brutally confront the legal wife, Josie. Jaclyn Jose played protagonist Josie who also played the antagonist role of Senyõra Angelica Santibañez in the 2015 Marimar, which was originally played by Halili in 2007.

In February 2018, Halili played the main villain role of Isabelle in The Stepdaughters, Isabelle hates Mayumi from the start and does many evil things to her including her loved ones. Isabelle also killed her unborn half-sister and tried to kill her own father and orchestrated kidnappings and serial murders in the series. In the end she kidnaps Mayumi and tries to kill her by burning her face but failed.

In November 2018, Halili joined the series Pamilya Roces, she played Maisa, the villainous daughter of Virgil, a seductive and ruthless serial killer who wants revenge for her mother's death.

In 2019, she played her first anti-hero role in TODA One I Love where she played Georgina, a mysterious rich character who hates the evil Mayora Dyna and plotted to kill her husband. Georgina firstly appeared as a cold-hearted and seductive woman but in reality she is kind and was a victim of the latter's cruelty as Dyna and the Generoso's killed her father. Now she helps Gelay to stop Mayora's evil things and expose her secrets. She later played another protagonist role in Prima Donnas as Lillian Madreal, the surrogate mother of the triplets, Mayi, Ella, and Lenlen. Late 2022, she portrayed Diane Sebastian, the doting mother of Bianca and Hope Sebastian, in the series Unica Hija.

In February 2025, Halili played as Emma Joseco the good-hearted mother of Mookie Caparas, in the series Mommy Dearest.

== Filmography ==
=== Film ===
Year	Title	Role
2004	Kilig... Pintig... Yanig	
2005	Sablay Ka na Pasaway Ka Pa	Raven
2006	Gigil	Chynna
2006	Super Noypi	Annys
2007	Shake Rattle and Roll 9	Engkanto
2008	Romantic Island(Korean Movie)	cameo
2008	One Night Only	Jasmine
2009	Sundo	Kristina
2009	Dalaw	Daisy
2011	My Neighbor's Wife	Cameo
2015	Child Haus	Rose
2016	Higanti	Dolly
2018	Mga Anak ng Kamote	Iyong
2019	KontrAdiksyon	Yvonne Acosta
2023	AbeNida	Nida/Cecile

=== Television ===
Year	Title	Role
2003	StarStruck	Herself / Hopeful
2004–2009	Bitoy's Funniest Videos	Herself / J4K Host
2004–2005	Joyride	Vicki
2004–2005	Forever in My Heart	Janelle Bernabe
2005	Mars Ravelo's Darna	Carol / Black Darna
2005	Now and Forever: Ganti	Alexa
2006	Majika	Juno
2006–2007	Atlantika	Princesa Ruana / Helena
2007	Mga Kuwento ni Lola Basyang: Ang Prinsipeng Unggoy	Princess Ameris
2007	Lupin	Veronica Arkanghel a.k.a. Ashley Calibre
2007	Magpakailanman	Elaine
2007–2008	Marimar	Senyora Angelika Santibañez / Angelika Aldama
2008	MariMar: Rewind (Filipino Version)	Angélica de Santibañez (voice only)
2008	Sine Novela: Pablo S. Gomez' Magdusa Ka	Christine Salvador Doliente-Henson
2008	Obra: Katrina Halili	Various roles
2008–2009	Carlo J. Caparas' Gagambino	Lucy Gutierrez / Lady Mantisa
2009	Dear Friend: Magkaribal	Kim
2009	Rosalinda	Fedra Perez
2009–2010	Mars Ravelo's Darna	Serpina / Babaeng Anakonda / Valentina
2010	Carlo J. Caparas' Panday Kids	Amazona Wenoa
2010	Langit sa Piling Mo	Aurora Ty
2010	Kaya ng Powers	Carlotta
2010—2011	Beauty Queen	Dorcas Rivas
2010—2012	Party Pilipinas	Herself / Co-host / Performer
2011	Spooky Nights: Ang Manananggala: Battle of the Half-Sisters	Stella
2011	Munting Heredera	Lynette Sarmiento-Montereal
2011	Spooky Nights: KaLAbit	Iya
2012	Spooky Valentine: Masahista	Noemi / Melissa
2012	My Beloved	Emilia "Emmie" Montecastro
2013	Indio	Burigadang Pada Sinaklang Bulawan
2013	One Day Isang Araw	Yaya Maxima
2013	Sunday All Stars	Herself / Performer
2013–2014	Magkano Ba ang Pag-ibig?	Margarita "Margot" Cruz
2014	Niño	Hannah Sagrado-Ibarra
2015	Maynila: Totoy's True Lab	Leslie
2015	The Rich Man's Daughter	Maria Louella "Wila" Mateo
2015–2016	Destiny Rose	Jasmine Flores
2016–2017	Sa Piling ni Nanay	Scarlet Morato-Mercado
2017	Wagas: Ang Babaeng May Kambal Ahas	Conchita
2017	D' Originals	Yvette Benitez
2017	Road Trip	Herself / Guest
2017	Wagas: Drug Runner	Tintin
2017	Tadhana: Third Wife	Laisa
2017	Wagas: One Life to Give	Imelda Papin
2017	Dear Uge: Mr. + Mrs. + Ex	Mayette
2017	Kambal, Karibal	Nida Generoso
2018	The Stepdaughters	Isabelle Salvador
2018	Imbestigador	Margie
2018	Inday Will Always Love You	Herself
2018	Dear Uge: Basta Dubber, Sweet Lover	Gloria
2018	Imbestigador: Teacher Mhai	Mylene "Teacher Mhai" Durante
2018	Pamilya Roces	Maria Eloisa "Maisa" Renacia Quirante / Maisa Sampaguita
2019	TODA One I Love	Georgina Ferreira / Gregoria "Oriang"
2019	Magpakailanman: Mahal Ko ang Asawa ng Ama Ko	Mikaela
2019	Wagas: Ang Lihim ni Isadora	Maya
2019	Tadhana: Akin ang Anak Ko	Susan
2019–2022	Prima Donnas	Lilian Madreal-Claveria
2020	Magpakailanman: Husband for Sale	Rochelle
2021	Dear Uge: GangstaSistah	Red Pepper
2021	Magpakailanman: Asawa at Kabit sa Isang Bubong	Leah
2022	Tadhana: Hanggang Kailan	Victoria Terra-Dorata
2022–2023	Unica Hija	Diane Sebastian
2023	Wish Ko Lang: Paluwagan	Sara
2023	Magpakailanman: The Power of Love	Baby
2023–2024	Black Rider	Rona Marie Ana "Romana" Nadela-Tolentino
2023	Magpakailanman: Save my Children	Quirly Galache
2024	Recipes of Love: Tortang Talong with Tuna	Gemmalyn
2024	Lilet Matias: Attorney-at-Law	Lydia Soriano
2025	Mommy Dearest	Emma Espiritu-Joseco
2025	It's Showtime	Herself
2025–2026	Sanggang-Dikit FR	Lt. Charlie Samson
2025	Magpakailanman: Karibal noon, Beshie ngayon	Marie
2026	Magpakailanman: Amo ko, mahal ko!	Juliet
2026	Kamao	Nadia Panganiban-Batumbakal
2026	Tadhana: Akin Ang Lahat	Raquel
2026	Tadhana: Ang Manugang	Grace
2026	Magpakailanman: Mag-ama, Reunited sa Bus	Janeth

== Awards and nominations ==
Awards and nominations received by Katrina Halili
Award (Note: Awards, festivals, honors and other miscellaneous organizations are listed in alphabetical order.)	Year (Note: Indicates the year of ceremony. Each year is linked to the article about the awards held that year, wherever possible.)	Nominated work	Category	Result	Ref.
Emirates Film Festival	2024	AbeNida	Best Supporting Actress	Won	
Emirates Film Festival	2024	AbeNida	Best Ensemble (Note: (with Allen Dizon, Gina Pareño, Joel Lamangan, Leandro Baldemor, Vince Rillon, Kate Brios, Ina Alegre, Mimi Juareza, Nella Marie Dizon and Anna Jardin Cabrega))	Nominated	
Star Awards for Television	2018	The Stepdaughters	Best Drama Actress	Nominated	
ToFarm Film Festival	2018	Mga Anak ng Kamote	Best Actress	Nominated	

=== Listicles ===
Name of publisher, name of listicle, year(s) listed, and placement result
Publisher	Listicle	Year(s)	Result	Ref.
FHM	100 Sexiest Women in the World	2004	No. 8	
FHM	100 Sexiest Women in the World	2005	No. 14	
FHM	100 Sexiest Women in the World	2006	No. 1	
FHM	100 Sexiest Women in the World	2007	No. 1	
FHM	100 Sexiest Women in the World	2008	No. 2	
FHM	100 Sexiest Women in the World	2009	No. 5	
FHM	100 Sexiest Women in the World	2010	No. 6	
FHM	100 Sexiest Women in the World	2011	No. 6	
FHM	100 Sexiest Women in the World	2012	No. 16	
FHM	100 Sexiest Women in the World	2013	No. 27	
FHM	100 Sexiest Women in the World	2014	No. 31	
FHM	100 Sexiest Women in the World	2015	No. 15	
FHM	Top 25 Sexiest Women of the Decade	2000-2009	Placed	
Yes! Magazine	100 Most Beautiful Stars	2010	Placed	
