= Darna (2005 TV series) =

2005 Philippine television drama series

- Title card
- Genre: Action drama; Fantasy
- Based on: Darna by Mars Ravelo and Nestor Redondo
- Written by: Dode Cruz; Andrew Paredes; Ari Lam; Renato Custodio
- Directed by: Dominic Zapata; Eric Quizon
- Starring: Angel Locsin
- Theme music composer: Jay Durias; Sharon Inductivo
- Opening theme: "Di na Nag-Iisa" by Regine Velasquez
- Country of origin: Philippines
- Original language: Tagalog
- No. of episodes: 170

Production
- Executive producers: Angie Castrence; Edlyn Tallada
- Editors: Ver Custodio; Raul Santos; Duds dela Merced; Adrian Monserrate; Kiko Reyes
- Camera setup: Multiple-camera setup
- Running time: 30–40 minutes
- Production company: GMA Entertainment TV

Original release
- Network: GMA Network
- Release: April 4 – November 25, 2005

Related
- Darna (2009); Darna (2022)

Darna is a 2005 Philippine television drama fantasy action series broadcast by GMA Network. The series is based on Mars Ravelo's Philippine fictional character of the same name and its 2003's comic book miniseries published by Mango Comics. Directed by Dominic Zapata and Eric Quizon, it stars Angel Locsin in the title role. It premiered on April 4, 2005 on the network's Telebabad line up. The series concluded on November 25, 2005, with a total of 170 episodes.

== Cast and characters ==
Cast

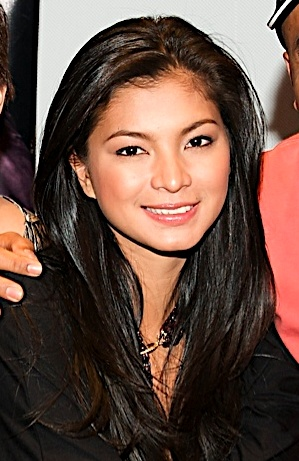
Angel Locsin

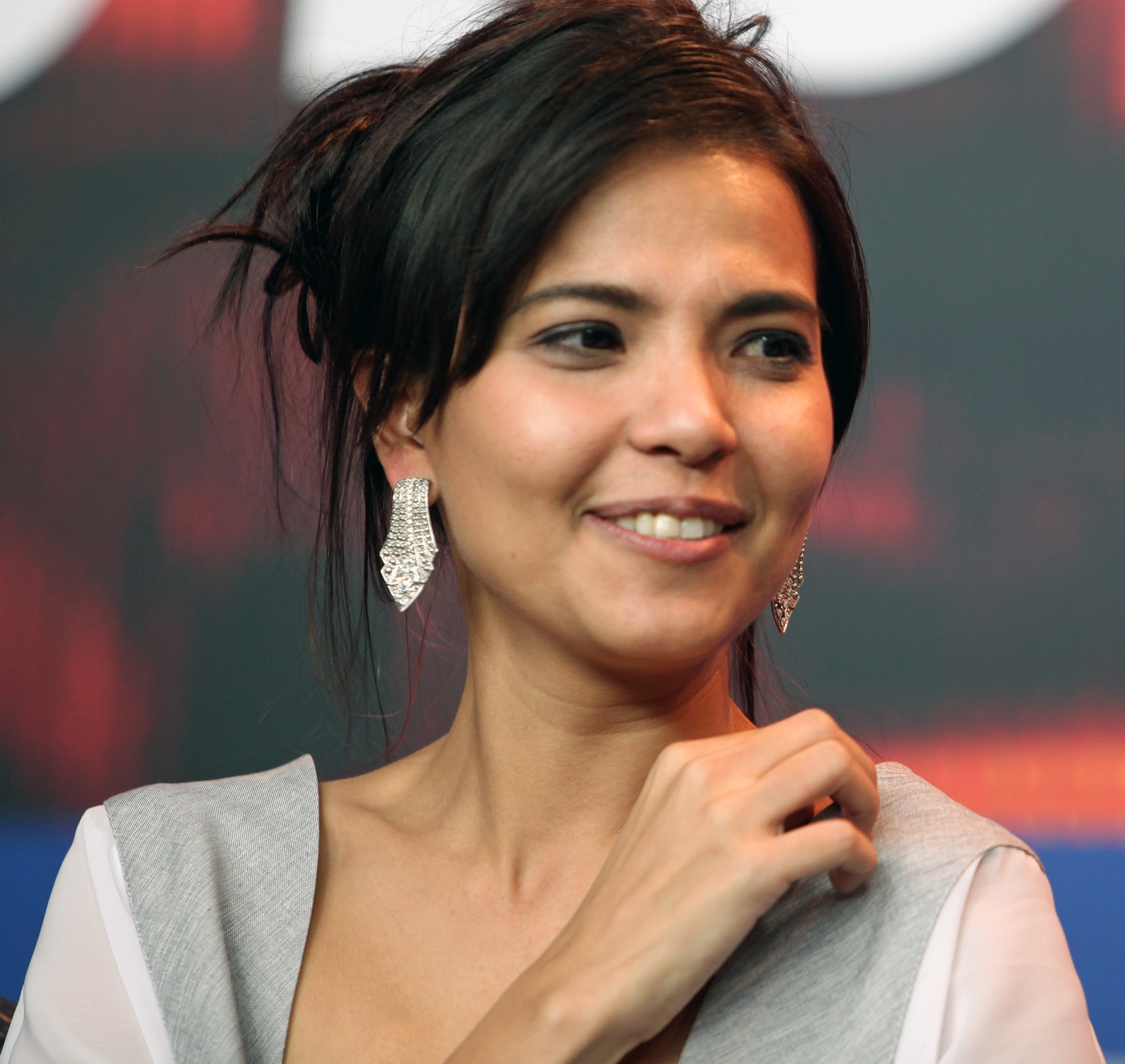
Alessandra De Rossi

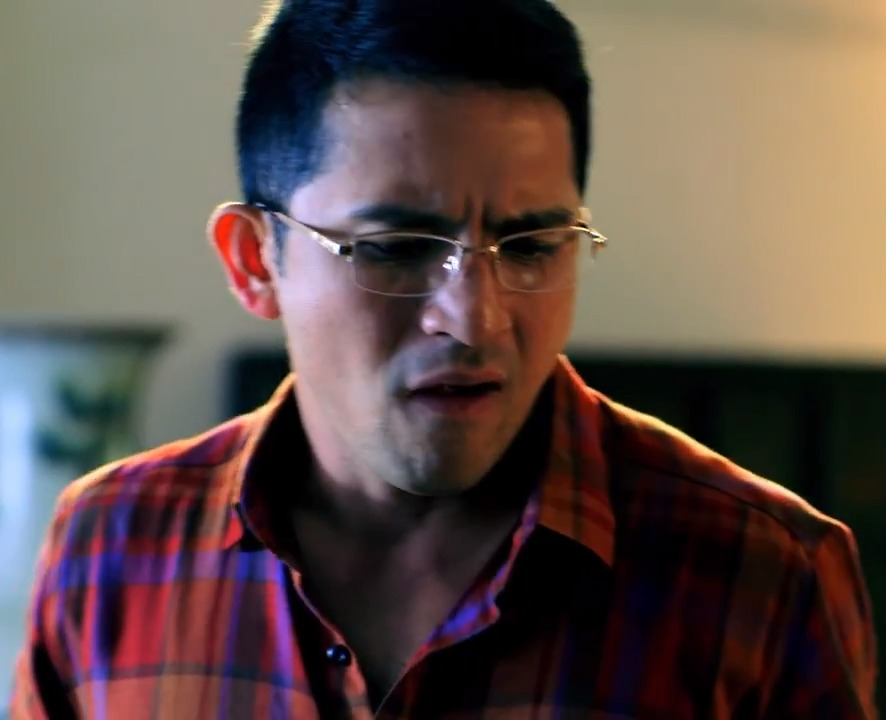
Dennis Trillo

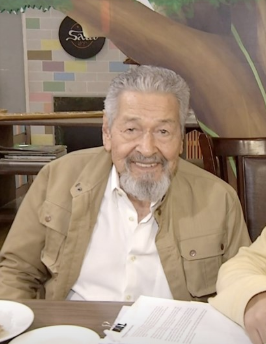
Eddie Garcia

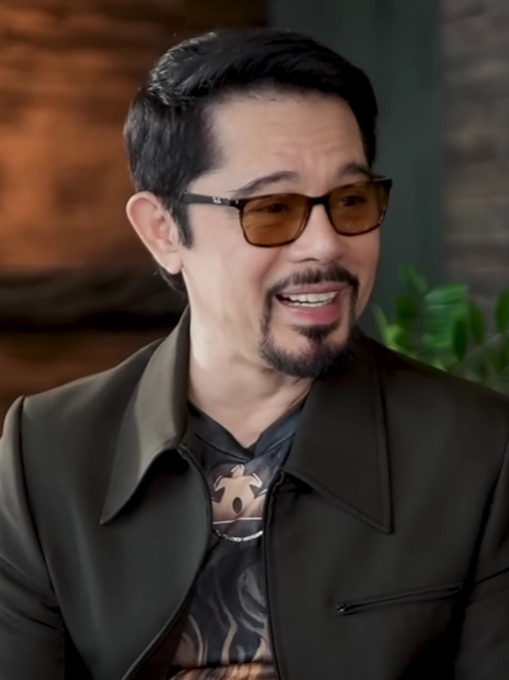
Christopher de Leon

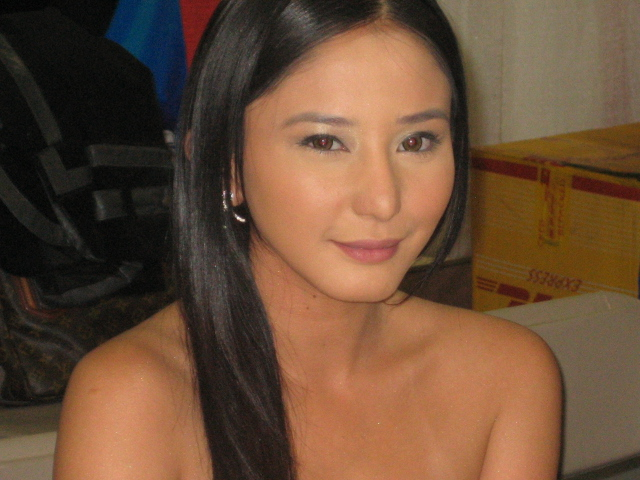
Katrina Halili

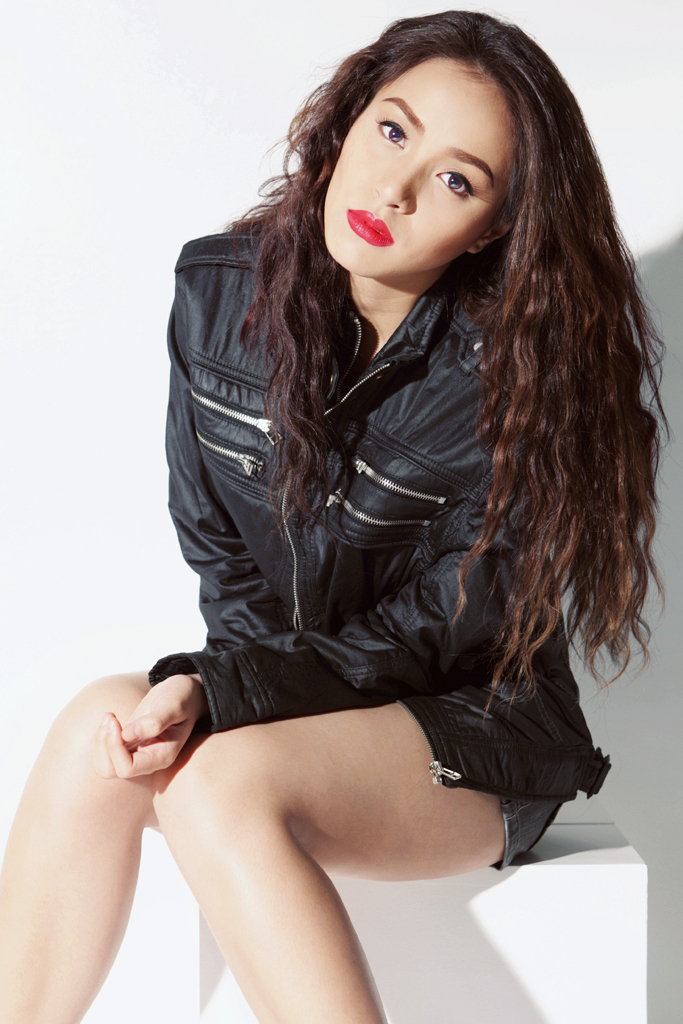
Cristine Reyes

Lead cast

- Angel Locsin as Darna / Narda

Supporting cast

- Alessandra De Rossi as Valentina
- Wendell Ramos as Jeric Frias
- Dennis Trillo as Efren / a snake man
- Jeremy Marquez as Jun
- Eddie Garcia as Oscar / Mambabarang
- Christopher de Leon as Ted / Dr. Zombie
- Celia Rodriguez as Braguda
- Gina Pareño as Milagros
- Sandy Andolong as Prospera
- Caridad Sanchez as Aio
- Carmina Villarroel as Sabrina / Sulfura
- Tonton Gutierrez as Mulong / Nosferamus
- Maureen Larrazabal as Aio
- Karen delos Reyes as Alice / Babaeng Tuod / Babaeng Impakta / Babaeng Lobo
- Katrina Halili as Carol / Black Darna
- Cristine Reyes as Molecula
- Ella Guevara as Lenlen
- Ryza Cenon as Louella / Divas Impaktitas
- C. J. Muere as Ding
- Francis Magundayao as Iking
- Nadine Samonte as Ava

Guest cast

- Lorna Tolentino as Queen Adran
- Lani Mercado as Ising
- Cogie Domingo as Daniel
- Ara Mina as Dyesebel
- Alice Dixson as Dyangga
- Rochelle Pangilinan as Corella
- K Brosas as Divina Demonica
- Bearwin Meily as Toy Master
- Maggie Wilson as Manananggal

== Casting ==
Philippine actress Iza Calzado was first approached for the role of Darna. Due to the requirement for Calzado to lose weight to wear the costume, the role eventually went to actress Angel Locsin.

== Ratings ==
According to AGB Nielsen Philippines' Mega Manila household television ratings, the pilot episode of Darna earned a 47.1% rating, the highest rating for a pilot episode in Philippine television. The series had its highest rating on April 7, 2005 with a 52.1% rating.

== Accolades ==
Accolades received by Darna
Year	Award	Category	Recipient	Result	Ref.
2005	PMPC Star Awards for Television	Best Primetime Drama Series	Darna	Nominated	
2005	PMPC Star Awards for Television	Best Drama Actress	Angel Locsin	Nominated	
2005	Golden Screen TV Awards	Outstanding Supporting Actress in a Drama Series	Alessandra de Rossi	Nominated	
2005	Golden Screen TV Awards	Outstanding Lead Actor in a Drama Series	Dennis Trillo	Nominated	
2005	Golden Screen TV Awards	Outstanding Director for a Drama Series	Eric Quizon Dominic Zapata	Nominated	
