= Darna =

Comic book superhero

- Textless cover of Darna #1 (February 2003); Art by Ryan Orosco

Publication information
- Publisher: Ace Publications
- First appearance: Pilipino Komiks, #77 (May 13, 1950)
- Created by: Mars Ravelo; Nestor Redondo

In-story information
- Alter ego: Narda
- Species: Transformed human / Marte-an (extra-terrestrial) meld
- Place of origin: Narda: Earth (Philippines); Darna: Marte (Planet)
- Team affiliations: Captain Barbell; Lastikman; Dyesebel
- Notable aliases: The Protector
- Abilities: Superhuman; strength, stamina, speed, reflexes, senses, agility, and endurance; Master martial artist and hand-to-hand combatant; High Level Intelligence; Flight; Immortality; Limited Telepathy; Memory Manipulation; Aerokinesis; Whirlwind Creation; Wind breath; Resistance to any forms of magic; Accelerated Healing Factor; Extrasensory Perception

Darna (Tagalog pronunciation: [ˈdaɾnɐ]) is a superheroine appearing in Filipino comic books created by writer Mars Ravelo and artist Nestor Redondo. The character was introduced during the Golden Age of Comic Books, debuting in Pilipino Komiks #77 on May 13, 1950. Darna is a retooling of Ravelo's earlier character, Varga, who first appeared in 1947. With her continued presence in literature and art, Darna has been described as a Filipino cultural icon. Throughout the years, she has been adapted to a number of media platforms, such as film, television, plays and video games.

Darna's origin story from the Golden Age relates that she was an extraterrestrial warrior from the planet Marte sent to Earth to fight against common criminals and greater forces of darkness, most famously her archenemy, Valentina. She is manifested by her human alter-ego Narda through the magical stone and is often accompanied by her younger brother, Ding. Darna possesses the allure of Venus, the glory of Apollo, and strength of Samson. She usually wears a red bikini or shorts with a gold star in each brassiere cap; a red helmet with encrusted gold winged medallion; gold bracelets; a golden medallion belt with a loincloth in the middle; and gold-rimmed red boots.

Darna is described as "the female avenger archetype, strong but compassionate." Inspired by the qualities of Ravelo's mother who raised him single-handedly and created as the Philippine female counterpart of Superman, she served as a symbol of hope and inspiration to the Filipino people following the aftermath of World War II.

== Publication history ==
Cover of Darna Pilipino Komiks #78 (May 1950). Art by Nestor Redondo.

=== Early years ===
Mars Ravelo created the first images of Darna before World War II, as the character's predecessor Varga. Ravelo's inspiration for Darna's heroic qualities came from a fascination with Jerry Siegel and Joe Shuster's Superman. The winged medallion on Darna's helmet was inspired by the emblem of the Philippine airforce as Ravelo also dreamed of the opportunity to fly. The magic white stone concept is cultural iconography as Philippine folklore has many stories of brave young mortals whose courage and heart enable them to be worthy of magic amulets - the only thing in these stories that could even the odds against evil, supernatural forces. The character was also based on and influenced by Wonder Woman.

After the war, Ravelo realized that the Filipinos were in need of a superhero so he again shopped his superheroine concept to publishers until one of them, Bulaklak Komiks agreed to publish Ravelo's heroine that he now called "Varga" in 1947 (inspired by the Varga girls series of illustrations) and the strip took off. Varga made her debut in Bulaklak Magazine, Vol. 4, #17 on July 23, 1947, which Ravelo wrote and drew. In an interview, Ravelo revealed that he offered his creation first to Liwayway Magazine and other publications but was rejected. Had Liwayway Magazine not rejected the offer, Varga would have been the Philippines' first komiks superhero.

Contrary to popular belief, Darna was not named after the magical Ibong Adarna (Adarna bird), which appears in a Philippine epic of the same name. In Bulaklak Magazine, Narda was already established as Varga's mortal identity. "Darna" was simply an anagram of "Narda". The concept and image of the character was based on the illustrations of Superman appearing on comic books brought by soldiers from the United States to the Philippines. It was the story of a mortal girl named Narda (named after one of Ravelo's childhood playmates), her brother Ding and their grandmother, Lola Asay, who lived in the town of Masambong when a falling star revealed itself to be a magic amulet that turns Narda into the superheroine Varga.

The name Varga was under ownership of Bulaklak Komiks. Darna's first adventure was first serialized in the pages of Pilipino Komiks (Ace Publications, Inc.) #77 on May 13, 1950, where she was pitted against the sultry snake goddess, Valentina. Here, Narda, a young girl, swallows a stone, which has the word "Darna" on it, and transforms into Darna by shouting out the latter's name. Likewise, Darna turns back into Narda by shouting Narda's name. The stone, which was from the planet Marte, stays in her body. Her secret is known to her grandmother and her brother, Ding, who becomes her sidekick. Darna quickly gained popularity among Filipino comic book readers. The original Darna comics series, written by Ravelo and illustrated by Redondo, ran for 28 issues.

=== Later years ===
On May 31, 1951, Darna made a crossover from comics to cinema even before the comic book serial was finished. Royal Publications under Fernando Poe Sr. produced the first Darna film starring Rosa Del Rosario as Narda/Darna. It was the last film directed by Fernando Poe Sr. Since then, a number of actresses and actors have portrayed the superheroine on both cinema and television. Some made from 1973 onwards starred the future multi-awarded dramatic actress and politician Vilma Santos. In this incarnation, Darna's origin was changed. Narda herself became Darna, unlike the original in which she just "channeled" her. The stone came out of Narda's mouth every time she changes back and she had to swallow it every time she wanted to transform (a revision that became the standard for the following incarnations). Darna is not specified as coming from Marte and is mentioned simply as a "Warrior of Light". In this version, Narda was aged up from a child to her early teens, and only Ding was aware of her secret. This version of Darna became most people's idea of the character for about 3 decades. A catchphrase popularized by the films and said by Narda runs, "Ding, ang bato!" ("Ding, [give me] the stone!"). In 1977, the first Darna TV series was produced by Kitchie Benedicto and aired on RPN (KBS-9). Darna! The TV Series starred Lorna Tolentino as Darna/Narda. Darna also had her own cartoon series in 1986 aired on GMA Network.

=== The Mango Comics miniseries ===
In 2003, a National Book Award-winning Darna limited miniseries was published by Mango Comics, with major input from Ravelo's family. Darna is a three-part 50th Anniversary Issue (36 pages per issue, full-color, in English). The first part of the series was released on February 28, 2003, the second part on May 7, 2003, and the last part on December 13, 2003. The storyline was written by Bobby Yonzon with each issue drawn by different artist.

== Fictional character biography ==
The story of Darna begins with a village girl named Narda who lives in the provincial town of Masambong with her brother Ding. The siblings were orphaned and consequently adopted by their grandmother Asay. Narda loves to sing while her younger brother, Ding, plays the harmonica very well. Sometimes, Narda and Ding go from house to house and sing for money to help their grandmother support their daily needs. While playing a game of "Hide and Seek" one night, Narda saw a shooting star in the night sky. The celestial object crashed into the woods. Impressed by its beauty, she picked it up and decided to keep it. When her playmates started looking for her, she immediately hid the white stone in her mouth to prevent her playmates from taking it from her.

The white stone came alive and went down her throat into her stomach. She began to experience psychic flashes that flooded her mind with alien images of worlds far away which caused her to fall unconscious. She was found by her grandma, who took her home and put her to bed. When Narda woke up, she was back at home with her grandmother and her brother, Ding. They asked her what happened and she related her bizarre experience. When her grandmother asked her what the inscription was on the white stone she swallowed, Narda yelled ... "DARNA!" Her grandmother and brother were both startled by a flash of light and smoke that filled the room. Where Narda once stood, there now was a tall, beautiful warrior woman. She explained to them that she was "Darna of the Planet Marte" and that she was sent to Earth to face the forces of darkness and hatred that afflicted the world. Narda was channeling the alien woman. After she assured them that she meant no harm, Darna changed back to Narda by saying the latter's name.

=== Alter egos ===
==== Narda ====
Regardless of its many incarnations, the story of Darna begins with a village girl named Narda who finds a small white stone, a tiny meteorite from outer space. Narda swallows the stone, and when she shouts "Darna," she becomes a mighty warrior ready to defend Earth from evil forces.

==== Daria ====
Mars Ravelo created a second alter-ego named Daria in "Si Darna at Planetman" serialized in Holiday Komiks in 1969. For the first time, Darna transformed into Daria in the third issue of Si Darna at ang Planetman. Daria is a grown up version of Narda. In the 1969 film Darna at ang Planetman, Gina Pareño played Darna and Daria; she was the only actress to portray Darna's alter-ego Daria.

== Characterization ==
=== Powers, abilities, and equipment ===
The White Stone is Darna's main source of power. While normally having no special powers in her human alter ego as Narda, once she shouts the word "Darna!", she transforms into the extraterrestrial warrior in peak physical condition with multiple godlike superpowers. This include superhuman strength, nigh-invulnerability, speed, senses, flight and longevity which enhances her fighting prowess. From the beginning, she is depicted as a highly skilled warrior that excels in all forms of battle combat. She has since developed other powers through the years such as limited telepathy, aerokinesis, enhanced agility and reflexes, and memory manipulation among others.

=== Costume ===
Art by Ryan Orosco

Darna's costume has varied over time, although almost all of her costume incarnations have retained some form of red bikini with a gold star on each brassiere cup, red headdress/helmet with a ruby set on a gold-winged ornament, gold bracelets, gold medallion belt with a loincloth, and near knee-high red boots.

Darna is a character that fused together the concept of a superhero with the traditions of Philippine folklore. The yellow/gold stars come from the Philippine flag, the loincloth (bahag) is a visual inspiration from native clothing, and the agimat come from Filipino folklore and superstition. Filipino folklore has a tradition of presenting humble, pure hearted mortals that are awarded amulets that allow them to (in a way) transform their virtues into superpowers that allow them to battle supernatural evil.

In Darna vs. the Planet Women (1975), Santos wore a dark blue bikini top with red stars, dark blue boyshorts, gold belt, and red loincloth, boots, bracelets and choker almost similar to Darna's costume in Pilipino Komiks Darna #99 (March 17, 1951), Pilipino Komiks Darna at ang Babaing Lawin #120 (January 5, 1952), Darna Komiks Darna at ang Taong Ibon #964 (October 12, 1967) and Darna Komiks Darna vs. Zumarna #1275 (September 27, 1993) except for the gold headpiece which is similar to her headpiece in Pilipino Komiks Darna #87 (September 30, 1950).

In Darna: The Ballet (2003), Kristine Crame and Kris Belle Paclibar who alternately played Darna wore the costume. There were two versions of the costume: (1) the traditional red bikini with gold stars, red helmet with gold winged medallion, red bracelet adorned with gold medallions, gold belt and loincloth, and red ballerina shoes adorned with gold medallions (the ballerina shoes looked like boots); and (2) red bra with gold dots surrounding the gold stars, yellow shorts, red helmet adorned with a seemingly large gold bird, red bracelets and belt both with gold embellishments, and red loincloth and boots.

== In other media ==
=== Film ===
Title	Year	Darna	Director	Screenwriter	Story	Notes
Darna	1951	Rosa del Rosario	Fernando Poe Sr.		Mars Ravelo	
Darna at ang Babaing Lawin	1952	Rosa del Rosario	Carlos Vander Tolosa		Mars Ravelo	
Si Darna at ang Impakta	1963	Liza Moreno	Danilo H. Santiago	Ruben Rustia		
Isputnik vs. Darna	1963	Liza Moreno	Natoy B. Catindig			
Darna at ang Babaing Tuod	1965	Eva Montes	Cirio H. Santiago	Ruben Rustia		
Si Darna at ang Planetman	1969	Gina Pareño	Marcelino D. Navarro			
Lipad, Darna, Lipad!	1973	Vilma Santos	Emmanuel H. Borlaza; Elwood Perez; Joey Gosiengfiao	Joey Gosiengfiao		
Darna and the Giants	1973	Vilma Santos	Emmanuel H. Borlaza; Leody M. Diaz (guest)	Emmanuel H. Borlaza		
Darna vs. the Planet Women	1975	Vilma Santos	Armando Garces			
Bira! Darna, Bira!	1979	Rio Locsin	Tito Sanchez	Johnny Pangilinan	ACM	
Darna and Ding	1980	Vilma Santos	J. Erastheo Navoa; Cloyd Robinson			
Captain Barbell	1986	Sharon Cuneta	Leroy Salvador	Jose Javier Reyes	Mars Ravelo	Cameo appearance
Darna	1991	Nanette Medved	Joel Lamangan	Frank G. Rivera	Eddie Rodriguez; Bey Vito	
Mars Ravelo's Darna! Ang Pagbabalik	1994	Anjanette Abayari	Peque Gallaga; Lore Reyes	Floy Quintos		
Mars Ravelo's Captain Barbell	2003	Regine Velasquez	Mac C. Alejandre	RJ Nuevas		Cameo appearance

=== Television ===
Title	Year	Darna
Darna	1977	Lorna Tolentino
Mars Ravelo's Darna	2005	Angel Locsin
Mars Ravelo's Darna	2009	Marian Rivera
Mars Ravelo's Darna	2022–2023	Jane De Leon

Other appearances

- Chiquito in Terribol Dobol (1974) as a male Darna
- Dolphy in Darna, Kuno...? (1979) as a male Darna
- Brenda del Rio in Darna, Kuno...? (1979)
- Lotis Key in Darna, Kuno...? (1979)
- Niño Muhlach in Darna and Ding (1980) as Narda's brother Ding who temporarily became a male Darna
- Katrina Halili in Mars Ravelo's Darna (2005 TV series) as Black Darna
- Angel Aquino in Mars Ravelo's Darna (2009 TV series) as the original Darna and keeper of the white stone
- Tetchie Agbayani and Kim Molina in Hindi Ako Si Darna (2017 theatre play)
- Iza Calzado in Mars Ravelo's Darna (2022 TV series) as First Darna and keeper of the white stone
- Janella Salvador in Mars Ravelo's Darna (2022 TV series) as Green Darna

=== Animation ===
- Darna appears in Hero City Kids Force, voiced by Rona Aguilar. Depicted as a young superhero, she is joined by other Ravelo comic characters Captain Barbell and Lastikman.

=== Video Games ===
- Darna appears as a claimable special skin in Rules of Survival, alongside Captain Barbell and Lastikman.

=== Theater ===
==== Pilipino Komiks (1993) ====
On April 22–25, 1993, prima ballerina Lisa Macuja-Elizalde played Darna and Melanie Motus played Valentina in the musical stage play entitled Pilipino Komiks with Maritoni Tordesillas as Dyesebel and Noreen Austria as Bangenge; Katrina Santos; Osias Barroso as Dario; Raoul Banzon as Gorio; Cathy Lee as Rita; and Robert Policarpio as Ipe. This ballet stage production was presented by Philippine Ballet Theatre and featured comic book characters made by Mars Ravelo, including Darna, Valentina, Dyesebel, Rita Rich, Ipe and Bangenge, in a comedic way. Chino Toledo's music, Gener Caringal's choreography, Arturo' set and costume designs, and lighting by Eric Cruz brought comics to life on the stage.

After 24 years, this dance story of the battle between good and evil that was first choreographed by former PBT director Gener Caringal was re-staged again on May 14, 2017, by Philippine Ballet Theatre and co-presented by Filipino Heritage Festival, National Commission for Culture and the Arts, AB Leisure and Philippine Amusement and Gaming Corporation (PAGCOR) in celebration of Heritage Month. In this re-staging of Pilipino Komiks, Regine Magbitang played Narda/Darna while Loby Pimentel played Valentina; Peter San Juan as Narda's boyfriend, Dario; Veronica Atienza as Dyesebel; Kim Abrogena as Bangenge; Mark Pineda as Gorio; Marika Desembrana as Rita; and Matthew Davo as Ipe. Both plays were performed in the Cultural Center of the Philippines (CCP) Main Theater; the second play was additionally performed in Negros, Philippines.

==== Comics: The Ballet (1997) and Darna: The Ballet (2003) ====
In 1997, Lisa Macuja-Elizalde danced the part of Darna in Comics: The Ballet in celebration of Darna's golden anniversary. Another ballet stage play was produced on August 1–17, 2003 by Ballet Philippines and presented at the Cultural Center of the Philippines. In this theater version, entitled Darna: The Ballet, Christine Crame and Kris-Belle Paclibar alternately danced the part of Darna while Valentina did the singing. The dance-musical production equally focused on both Darna and Valentina.

==== Ding, Ang Bato! (2018) ====
On May 14 to 21, 2018, Ding, Ang Bato! that was presented by the Arts and Culture Cluster and the Dance Program of the School of Design and Arts of the De La Salle–College of Saint Benilde was a dance musical theatre that once more featured Darna and Valentina. Staged at School of Design and Arts (SDA) Theater at De La Salle College of St. Benilde on Pablo Ocampo St. and directed also by Chris Millardo, the story is told from the point-of-view of Ding (played alternately by Carlos Serrano, Juner Quiambao and John Peñaranda), the younger brother of Narda, who is born deaf in this version and accompanies Darna in the journey of empowerment.

The production reunited the team with Benilde's Dance Chair Christine Crame who deftly reprised the role of Darna from the production that first saw 'flight' at the Cultural Center of the Philippines Main Theater in 2003 and is now devised for contemporary audiences. Stage and TV actor Natasha Cabrera inhabits the role of Valentina. Olivia Bugayong alternates with Crame for Darna while Dani Idea alternates for Valentina. In this version, Valentina is a sympathetic character and has an alter-ego named Tina that was played by Lea Roque.

In this dance musical redux of "Darna", the Filipina super heroine grapples with the irascible serpent queen Valentina who used to be her childhood friend. Darna's encounter with Valentina flung the two friends, now arch-enemies, into realms of urban dystopia that make them confront their true selves. Choreography by Denisa Reyes and Ernest Mandap featured Filipino Sign Language.

=== Art and literature ===
Darna Komiks is a comic book series first published by Pilipino Komiks, Inc. and continued by Atlas Publishing Co., Inc. Its maiden issue appeared on February 3, 1968, with Ruben R. Marcelino as editor. In children's literature, Edgar Samar wrote a story entitled "Uuwi na ang Nanay kong si Darna" which won the PBBY-Salanga Writer's Prize in 2002 and was illustrated by Russell Molina, who won the PBBY Illustrator's Prize. In 2012, Anvil Publishing, Inc. published Darna & Other Idols by Marra P. L. Lanot with Marian Rivera as Darna on the cover. The book features former Darna actresses Marian Rivera and Vilma Santos, and Gina Alajar who played Narda in Si Darna at ang Planetman (1969).

=== Advertisements ===
The character of Darna was used in a series of Toyota Tamaraw FX commercials, with Anjanette Abayari, Alma Concepcion, and Daisy Reyes portraying Darna in 1997.

Angel Locsin also appeared as Darna in a 2006 Robitussin LiquiGel TV advertisement wearing her Darna costume from the 2005 TV series. It was directed by Avid Liongoren. The story started with a giant monster attacking a village. Narda was about to transform into Darna but was interrupted by her cough so she shouted only half of the name (Dar...). She was then seen holding a LiquiGel capsule which she swallowed to transform into Darna. She rescued some bystander first before defeating the giant monster to death.

=== Darna Lives! webcomic ===
In 2011, comic book creators Gerry Alanguilan and Arnold Arre partnered to write a 9-page concept webcomic called Darna Lives! which reimagined the life of Darna. Alanguilan wrote the story and Arre provided the art for the piece, which portrayed Darna's alter-ego Narda having forgotten her superhero identity and moved on to a life of obscurity and poverty, until fate intervenes to bring Darna back. Although short, the fan-fiction was notable for its significantly different portrayal of the character, since it was the first time the Narda alter-ego was portrayed as anything but a demure young woman.; Narda is married and has three children.

Commenting on the work in a Philippine Daily Inquirer interview, Alanguilan explained his motivations for coming out with the story:

"I think Arnold and I were able to show that Darna, as a character, can stand to be interpreted differently to allow her to remain appealing and relevant to a new audience. I hope Darna Lives! can push for this kind of change. I think Filipinos, as we have seen, are open too it, and comics creators and filmmakers do not need to keep relying on old tricks and gimmicks that have worked before. I hope it can push our storytellers in other media, especially TV and movies to be bolder. 'Di mage-gets ng masa yan' ('The masses won't understand that') is a stupid, cowardly statement that ensures nothing but stagnancy."

=== Music ===
==== Song in a story depiction ====
- "Kahit Man Lang Sa Pangarap" (1991)
  - Performed by: Vina Morales (1991 Movie OST)
- "Hindi Ako si Darna" (1998)
  - Filipino version of "Superwoman" popularized by Karyn White
  - Performed by: Jenine Desiderio
- "Narda" (2005)
  - Composed and Performed by: Kamikazee (2009 TV series OST)
- "Mamaw" (2005)
  - Performed by Michael V. (2009 TV series OST)
- "Time In" (2007)
  - Performed by: Yeng Constantino
- "Di Na Nag-iisa" (2005)
  - Performed by Regine Velasquez - Love theme from the 2005 Darna television series. This song was officially released by Universal Records in Regine Velasquez' Motion Picture Soundtrack, "Till I Met You". A 2nd version of "Di Na Nag-Iisa"(Acoustic version) appears on this same album.
  - Jona Viray also covered the song for her debut studio album, On My Own under the title 'Di Na Mag-iisa'.
- "Di Na Magigisa" (2005)
  - Performed by Michael V.
- "Darna, Ikaw Na" (2020)
  - Performed by Daryl Ong
- "Patuloy Lang Ang Lipad" (2022)
  - Performed by BGYO (2022 TV Series OST)
- "'Di Maghihiwalay" (2022)
  - Performed by LA Santos (2022 TV Series OST)
- "Lipad" (2022)
  - Performed by Young JV (2022 TV Series OST)

== Supporting characters ==
Darna faces a variety of foes ranging from common criminals to outlandish supervillains, often having tragic origin stories that lead them to a life of crime and evil. Valentina is the most iconic Filipino super-villain created by Mars Ravelo. If you have Darna, Valentina will eventually strike. Darna's other long-time recurring foes include Babaeng Lawin, Babaeng Impakta, Babaeng Tuod, and Babaeng Linta, among others.

=== Enemies ===
==== Golden Age ====
===== Valentina =====
Valentina (goddess of the snakes/serpents) is the most popular enemy of Darna in the comics, films and television. She envies Narda and never appreciates what is her own; she torments her and becomes the cause of most of her misfortunes. She can control all kinds of snakes being from the same race as the Serpent Queens of Tiamat. In most incarnations, she has snakes on her head which she hides under a wig like the Gorgon Medusa.

Cristina Aragon was the first to play Valentina on the big screen opposite the first Darna, Rosa del Rosario in Darna (1951). Celia Rodriguez played Babaing Ahas in Lipad, Darna, Lipad! (1973). Pilar Pilapil played the role in Darna (1991). Pilita Corrales played Valentina in Mars Ravelo's Darna! Ang Pagbabalik (lit. 'Mars Ravelo's Darna! The Return') (1994).

As Darna flew to the small screen so did Valentina. In Darna (2005), Alessandra De Rossi played the first TV Valentina followed by Iwa Moto in Darna (2009).

In Darna (2022 TV series), she is portrayed by Janella Salvador.

===== Babaeng Lawin =====
Babaeng Lawin appeared in Pilipino Komiks' Darna at ang Babaing Lawin (1951). She was born with superhuman strength and agility in the comics.

Elvira Reyes played the first Babaing Lawin/Armida on the big screen in Darna at ang Babaing Lawin (1952). Liza Lorena played the role in Lipad, Darna, Lipad! (1973) then Veronica Jones in Darna at Ding (1980).

But in the 2009 TV series, Babaeng Lawin (Armida the Robotic Hawk Woman), played by Ehra Madrigal, has enhanced strength, endurance, durability, speed and healing after being experimented on.

===== Babaeng Impakta =====
Babaeng Impakta is another classic Darna villainess that was updated in the 2009 TV series. She appeared in Kenkoy Komiks' Darna at ang Impakta (1962). Babaeng Impakta is actually a pair of conjoined twins—Roma and her impish twin. Roma was first played by Gina Alonzo and Paquito Salcedo played the demonic conjoined twin on the big screen in Si Darna at ang Impakta (1963). Gloria Romero played Babaeng Impakta in Lipad, Darna, Lipad! (1973). Impakta was played by Bing Loyzaga in Darna (1991). Nadine Samonte was Roma and Mura was her twin Impy in the 2009 TV series.

Roma who was born to a prominent family appears like a normal human with an angelic face and a sweet demeanor but her back is grotesquely humped.

===== Isputnik =====
Nida Blanca played Darna's rival superheroine, Isputnik, in Isputnik vs. Darna (1963).

===== Babaeng Tuod =====
Babaeng Tuod appeared in Liwayway Magazine's Darna at ang Babaing Tuod (1964). Babaeng Tuod/Lucy was first played on the big screen by Gina Alonzo in Darna at ang Babaing Tuod (1965). Alonzo previously played Roma ang Babaeng Impakta in Si Darna at ang Impakta (1963). Francine Prieto, who played the young Narda in Darna (1991) but was uncredited, played Babaeng Tuod/Lucifera in the 2009 TV series.

Babaeng Tuod (Lucifera the Wood Witch; Lucifera, the Tree Monster) is the embodiment of nature as she is a living tree.

===== Planetman =====
Planetman appeared in Holiday Komiks-Magasin's Darna at ang Planetman (1968). Vic Vargas played the Planetman in Si Darna at ang Planetman (1969).

===== Babaeng Linta =====
Babaeng Linta first appeared in Darna Komiks-Magasin's Darna at ang Babaing Linta #1 (February 3, 1968).

Babaeng Linta (Leech Woman) has two alter egos: Octavia Moran, a 1940s actress and Lutgarda Morales, an actress and model in 2009. Babaeng Linta got her powers from a lake infested with leeches. Octavia used her newfound abilities to wreak vengeance upon the men that molested her, one of which was Adolfo Sandejas, Pancho's (played by Dennis Trillo) grandfather.

Binibining Pilipinas World 2007 Maggie Wilson played the role in the 2009 TV series.

===== Giants =====
In Darna and the Giants (1973), the giants were played by Divina Valencia, Ike Lozada, Pepito Rodriguez, Cesar Ramirez, Zandro Zamora and Max Alvarado. In Darna at Ding (1980), Max Alvarado also played the Giant.

===== X-3-X =====
Helen Gamboa played the alien warrior queen X-3-X in Darna and the Giants (1973).

===== Elektra =====
Rosanna Ortiz played Elektra in Darna vs. the Planet Women (1975).

Regine Velasquez, who previously had a cameo as Darna in the 2003 film Captain Barbell, played Elektra (Reyna ng mga Amasona) in the 2009 TV series.

===== The Planet Women =====
In Darna and the Giants (1973), the Planet Women were played by Lorelei, Elizabeth Vaughn, Karina Zawalski, Anita Lincoln, Cristy Soriano and Lorna Locsin. There were also Planet Men in the film who were played by Ricky Valencia, Karlo Vero, Dave Esguerra, Robert Miller, and Greg Lozano (uncredited).

In Darna vs. the Planet Women (1975), Lita Vasquez played Kara, the Planet woman, while the other Planet women were played by Diana Villa and Lieza Zobel.

===== Lei Ming =====
Celia Rodriguez, who previously played Babaeng Ahas in Lipad, Darna, Lipad! (1973), played an evil witch named Lei Ming in Darna at Ding (1980).

===== Dr. Vontesberg =====
Marissa Delgado played Dr. Vontesberg in Darna at Ding (1980).

===== Satanina Dayabolika =====
Satanina Dayabolika appeared in Kampeon Komiks' Darna Versus Santanina Dayabolika (1977).

===== Black Widow =====
Black Widow appeared in Ravelo Magazine's Darna at ang Black Widow (February 14, 1980).

===== Dyangga =====
Dyangga appeared in Darna Komiks' Darna vs. Dyangga (January 21, 1985). Alice Dixson had a cameo as Dyangga in the 2005 TV series. Dixson played another Ravelo creation, Dyesebel in the 1990 film of the same name. But in the series, it was Ara Mina who portrayed Dyesebel for a cameo.

===== Taong Diablo =====
Taong Diablo appeared in Darna at ang Taong Diablo (November 11, 1985).

==== Modern Age (1986-present) ====
===== Taong Ibon =====
Taong Ibon appeared in Darna Komiks Magasin's Darna at ang Taong Ibon (October 12, 1987).

===== The Warlock =====
The Warlock appeared in Darna Komiks' Darna vs. the Warlock (June 25, 1990).

===== Valentine =====
Valentine Adan is Valentina's daughter. Cherie Gil played Valentine in Mars Ravelo's Darna! Ang Pagbabalik (lit. 'Mars Ravelo's Darna! The Return') (1994). She is often confused as Valentina who was played by Pilita Corrales. Like Valentina and Medusa, she has snakes on her head.

===== Dominico Lipolico =====
Edu Manzano played Dominico Lipolico in Darna 1991 and Mars Ravelo's Darna! Ang Pagbabalik (1994).

===== Magnum =====
Bong Alvarez played Magnum in Mars Ravelo's Darna! Ang Pagbabalik (1994)

===== Zumarna =====
Zumarna appeared in Darna Komiks' Darna vs. Zumarna (1992).

===== Black Mercury =====
Black Mercury appeared in Darna Komiks' Darna vs. the Black Mercury (1994).

===== Araknido =====
Araknido appeared in Darna Komiks Magazine's Darna vs. Araknido (August 12, 1996).

===== Toxic Monster =====
Toxic Monster appeared in Super Action Komiks' Darna at ang Toxic Monster (1999).

===== Mirca =====
Mirca first appeared in Super Action Vol. 2 #12 Paano Kung May Tatlong Darna? (1999), a retelling of Darna's origin; it turns out that the magic stone Narda saw fall from the sky was only one of three. Carmi is an orphan who founds the second stone landing somewhere in Europe and with the stone's power, she becomes the heroine Mirca who sells her services to the highest bidder.

===== Ion =====
Ion is a strange reptile-like alien creature who first appeared in Super Action Vol. 2 #12 Paano Kung May Tatlong Darna? (1999). He holds the third stone and assumes a human disguise as Oni Basilisk, the head of the weapons manufacturing firm Kran Industries.

===== China =====
She rarely assumes her full serpentine form compared to Ebony and prefers to utilize her humanoid reptilian form complete with legs.

===== Mambabarang =====
Mambabarang (Lord of Insects and Pests) wreaks havoc in society with his insects and pests. Eddie Garcia played Mambabarang/Oscar in the 2005 TV series.

===== Dr. Zombie =====
Dr. Zombie (Mad Scientist/Re-Animator of corpses) invented a concoction to cure his wife (played by Rio Locsin) from end-stage cancer but was too late to cure her. His life took a twisted turn after the death of his beloved wife. His concoction had the power to reanimate the dead-into zombies. He also wields an assortment of weaponry unique only to himself. Christopher de Leon played Dr. Zombie/Ted in the 2005 TV series.

===== Braguda =====
Braguda, the Queen of Darkness and ruler of the Anomalkas (Planet Marte's evil underground dwelling race), is the main villain of the 2005 TV series. She is the powerful queen of the Anomalkan race of the Planet Marte who dreams of the whole galaxy bowing down to her but for that to happen, she must obtain Darna's white stone and merge it with her black stone so that she may transform the Planet Earth into a new version of the Planet Marte. Celia Rodriguez, who previously played two different Darna villains: Babaing Ahas in Lipad, Darna, Lipad! (1973) and Lei Ming in Darna at Ding (1980), played Braguda in the 2005 TV series; she went on to play Ms. Perfecta in the 2009 TV series.

===== Sulfura =====
In 2005 TV Series, Sabrina/Sulfura is the rival model of Valentina in fashion industry. When Valentina is noticed that Sabrina gained more support from the public than her, she throw an acid to Sabrina's face to make her ugly. Because of that, Sulfrura bring to life with the power to fly, spew fire, rocks and acid to melt her enemies. Carmina Villarroel played Sulfura/Sabrina.

===== Nosferamus =====
Nosferamus, a super being like the Grim Reaper, is the right-hand man of Braguda. He is the transformed form of Narda's father who she thought is dead. His powers include being able to dissolve into a black mist, summon blasts of dark-red energy, and conjure a lump of molten metal which he flung at Darna's eyes, blinding the superheroine. He died when he sacrificed his life for his daughter. Tonton Gutierrez played Nosferamus/Mulong in the 2005 TV series.

===== Babaeng Lobo =====
Babaeng Lobo was played by Karen delos Reyes who also played as Alice, Babaeng Tuod and Babaeng Impakta in the 2005 TV series.

===== Black Darna =====
Black Darna/Carol first appeared in Darna (2005) and was played by Katrina Halili. She was the result of Darna's cooped up emotions; Darna's essence turned into a supervillain of equal strength and ability. Black Darna is one of the most formidable adversaries of Darna as she's also noticeably faster than her. Like Darna, her only weakness is that she draws her powers from the white stone.

===== Molecula =====
Molecula (Toxic Woman) is a shapeshifter who can break herself apart to a molecular level, splitting herself to countless, minute molecular parts to gain more mobility and versatility; she could also fling these particles at targets and trigger a dissolving effect, similar to corrosive acid, or coagulate them instantly. Cristine Reyes played Molecula in the 2005 TV series.

===== Divas Impaktitas =====
The Divas Impaktitas are the three right hand she-vampires of Valentina. They were created by the black stone, granting them immunity to the sun as well as crosses and crucifixes, though they could still be slain if something sharp like a stake is driven through their hearts. Ryza Cenon played Louella/Divas Impaktita in the 2005 TV series.

===== Divina Demonica =====
Divina Demonica has the power to scream supersonic screams that could give severe trauma to those within her vicinity. She also suck the voice of her targets to bring her back to her famous times as a singer. She also demonstrates the ability to manipulate bats. K Brosas played Divina Demonica in the 2005 TV series.

===== Toy Master =====
Toy Master is a clown who has the power to control toys as well as other abilities that border on the realm of magic, allowing him to defy the fabric of reality by summoning corporeal objects out of nothing or generating an irritating sound by beating his drum, powerful enough to disorient even Darna. He stole his magical powers from a gnome. Bearwin Meily played Toy Master in the 2005 TV series.

===== Manananggal =====
Manananggal is a female body separated and grows a giant bat wings on back and teeth grown a fang and pregnant women will eat the fetus' heart.

The first one is portrayed by Gloria Romero, In 1991 film she was portrayed by Bing Loyzaga, In 2005 she was portrayed by Maggie Wilson later in 2009 she was Portrayed by SexBomb Girl Rochelle Pangilinan. Ivana Alawi was supposed to be a Manananggal in 2022 Darna however due to scariest character only removed.

===== Trolka =====
Trolka is an Anomalkan warrior in the 2005 TV series.

===== Kobra =====
Paolo Contis played Kobra/Xandro ang "Hari ng Lipi ng mga Ahas" (lit. 'Lord of Serpents') in the 2009 TV series. In the original comics version (1950), Kobra was a female. This form seems to give him the benefit of his snake form while giving him the ability to hold things with his clawed hands. He can also squish his opponents with his deadly coils. He was secretly Valentina's real father. He impregnated Roma ang Babaeng Impakta to bear him more of his serpentine race after seeing her in his cave and for the purpose of having an heir that will be more faithful to him than his other daughter, Valentina. He may be invulnerable to bullets but not from sharp objects.

===== Serpina =====
Serpina (Babaeng Anakonda), the princess of the snakes and Valentina's half-sister, was played by Katrina Halili in the 2009 TV series. Halili previously played Black Darna in 2005. Serpina is Kobra's daughter with Roma (Babaeng Impakta). She also uses a powerful staff as her weapon. She even has a psychic rapport with Valentina that allows them to communicate telepathically.

===== Vibora =====
Vibora is Valentina's loyal serpent.

===== Bazooka Gang =====
Shiro, played by Polo Ravales, is a local crime lord and the leader of the Bazooka Gang. Shiro abducted Armida/Babaeng Lawin and brought her to Dr. Danilo Morgan (Dr. Montgomery's grandson) to reattach her wings. Liberty, played by Krista Kleiner, is Shiro's lieutenant and possible girlfriend.

===== Babaeng Gagamba =====
Babaeng Gagamba (Secretary Rizza Miranda at the Hospicio residence)

===== Babaeng Demonyita =====
Jackie Rice played Helga Demonyita, a powerful witch who preys on innocent children, in the 2009 TV series. She was possessed by the devil and like it she is closed red, has horns on her forehead and a long tail which she uses as a whip. She has a hatred over humanity. She uses voodoo dolls and can also control fire. She is invulnerable to bullets. She can also vanish into fire.

===== Vladimir =====
Vladimir is a vampire who was played by Akihiro Sato in the 2009 TV series. He appears to be a tall, dark and handsome man as described by Francesca. Like any vampire, he cannot stand the sun.

===== General Borgo =====
An extraterrestrial invader from Planet Ludo. He was played by actor Richard Quan in 2022 TV Series. He wants to take the white stone away from the protector to reshape the world for himself and turn humans into his soldiers. He also wants to control the spread of extras through his devoted lieutenant, Xandra/Ishna. He killed Regina's father Rex Vanguardia and copied his appearance in order to watch his most powerful weapon, Valentina. He poses as other identities as well such as the powerful old lady, Madam Victoria Villacerran. He also poses as Darna to ruin her reputation to the public.

===== Hergis/Master Klaudio =====
In 2022 TV Series, Hergis/Master Klaudio is the former ally of General Borgo. He is responsible for the death of Narda & Ding's mother, Leonor. He tried to fight with Darna but later on he formed an alliance with her driven by his personal vendetta against General Borgo after he discovered that the latter is the one who killed his child. He has the ability to regenerate his cells at will, enabling him to recover fast from injuries. He also possesses super strength and combat skills. Hergis/Master Klaudio is portrayed by Joko Diaz.

===== Strength Man =====
Jerald Napoles portrayed the role of Strength Man/Fredo Mitron in 2022 TV Series. He is a doting father/miner. He was trapped in the quarry after Mayor Zaldy gave the go signal to blast the quarry site where the Martean Sentient was buried. He was struck by the airborne crystal shards that gave him superhuman strength and can sustain any physical attacks and use it to destroy anything at will.

===== Lindol Man =====
Dominic Ochoa played the role of Lindol Man/Engr. Javier Toledo in 2022 TV Series. He is a former engineer who wants to reveal the corruption behind the building of a facility using substandard materials. But powerful officials conspired to stopped him by burying him alive while unconscious. His powers include the ability to control and manifest earthquakes at will. He also has telekinesis that he used once to attack the goons to save his wife.

===== Killer Ghost =====
Award-winning actor Christian Bables played the role of Killer Ghost/Dr. Alex dela Torre in 2022 TV Series. His anger starts when his father was bullied because a patient died while under his care. He is a former doctor who kills his targets using poisonous drugs. He also has the power to pass on walls and became invisible if he wants to.

===== Levitator =====
Actor-host Enchong Dee portrayed the role of Levitator/Elijah "Eli" Torres in 2022 TV Series. He is a journalist who was bullied because of being a son of a killer. He became an "extra" after he was being struck by a crystal fragment from Marte. His main source of power is telekinesis.

===== Clone Man =====
Neil Coleta is the Clone Man/Vincent "Vince" Eugenio in 2022 TV Series. He is a part of a group called "El Diablo". Because of Annie, he wants to leave the group for good. But Ishna turned him into an "extra" by telling him that there's someone who wants to kill him once he left the group. His powers are kinetic replication and limited teleportation which he can use to make multiple clones of himself if he decides to fight or escape.

===== Silent Shocker =====
Boom Labrusca played the role of Silent Shocker/Angelo Villacorta in 2022 TV Series. His source of power is electrokinesis where he can disrupt and control anything using electricity. He can also form a shield using electricity to protect himself from human attacks (like bullets). His wife and child was killed in an ambush, making him to prefer Valentina's killing spree to eradicate the evil beings in Nueva Esperanza and opposing Darna's way of giving justice by orchestrating accidents that ruin the latter's reputation.

===== Human Urchin =====
Loren Burgos played the role of Human Urchin/Prof. Luisa Espiritu in 2022 TV Series. She is a professor stabbed to death by two thugs and whose body was penetrated by the green crystal fragments transforming her into an "extra" with killer spikes that resemble the components of human bones.

===== Dragon Mouth =====
Karl Gabriel portrayed the role of Dragon Mouth/Inno Camarin in 2022 TV Series. He is part of X-Triad (combination of extra and triad). He spits acid fluid and melts anything where it lands into.

===== Seductress =====
Jef Gaitan portrayed the role of Seductress/Kiara Balisi in 2022 TV Series. The red-haired extra who also part of X-Triad. She can hypnotize her targets to manipulate their perceptions. And anyone under the thrall of her powers will not be able to resist her commands.

===== Boy Chop-Chop =====
The youngest member of X-Triad, Boy Chop-Chop/Miguel Lagdameo is also part of the group. He can detach his hands from his body. Henz Villaraiz portrayed this character in 2022 TV Series.

===== Dr. Florentino Ibarra =====
He is the scientist-in-charge for the facility established to house the extras. He was killed after fighting with Darna. He was portrayed by Lito Pimentel.

===== General Borgo's "Super Soldiers"(2022 TV Series) =====
- Joshua Garcia as Dark Brian

Brian's doppelganger, he was brought to life when shards of chrysalis merged to a mirror where Brian was looking at. He can use various weapons like gun and arrows. He kidnapped the real Brian to fulfill his evil desires.

- Paolo Gumabao as Noah Vallesteros

Son of Mayor Zaldy Vallesteros who has feelings for Narda. His father despised him because he was blamed for his wife's (which is Noah's mother) death. He turned into an "extra" after his father injected him a serum he got from a facility for extras. His source of power is Pyrokinesis where he can create and control fire whenever he wants.

- Eric Fructuoso as PEMS Arthur Pineda

A corrupt policeman who despised the Robleses. He is responsible for the death of Brian's father. Borgo turned him into an "extra". As an "extra", he has the power to control waste & trash.

- Mark Manicad as Ali Corpuz

Regina's bodyguard who has a secret feelings for her. Aside from Borgo, He knows the secret that Regina is Valentina. He became an "extra" to get revenge on Darna because he thinks she is the one who killed Regina. As an "extra", he gained heat vision for his powers.

- Joshua Colet as Siegfried Cruz

A journalist, who became an "extra" because of General Borgo.He has a power to summon a force field around him and others.

- Dawn Chang as Maisha Rodriguez

Mayor Zaldy's secretary. She acts as eyes and ears of Madam Victoria (General Borgo's alter ego). Her power is hypnotism where she can hypnotize her targets allowing them to copy her every move.

- Young JV as Andre Abesamis

Narda and Brian's fellow EMT at Vanguardia Rescue. He was kidnapped by Dr. Ibarra's men to turn him into an "extra". As an "extra", he can increase the energy of an object, allowing it to explode.

- Simon Ibarra as Mayor Zaldy Vallesteros/Mr.X

He is the councilor turned mayor of Nueva Esperanza after he planned the death of incumbent mayor and vice mayor to secure the mayoralty position. He turned himself into an "extra" by injecting himself a serum he got from the facility. As an "extra" he has the power to grow into a giant with astounding muscular strength.

- Kim Rodriguez as Ishna/Xandra

She is the devoted General Borgo's lieutenant. She do all the work for him by recruiting, manipulating "extras" and patrolling Nueva Esperanza to get the white stone from its protector. She possesses superhuman strength, shows impressive combat skills and shapeshifting abilities.

== Merchandising ==
=== Funko Pop! ===
The Darna x Funko Pop! vinyl figurine was first announced on the second day of ToyCon 2019 on June 29, 2019, at the SMX Convention Center in Pasay in a panel celebrating Darna's 70th anniversary. On July 25, 2019, ABS-CBN, the media company producing the new Darna movie, announced that the figurine by US-based toy manufacturer Funko will be exclusively available in the Philippines during Fun Con 2019 through Big Boys Toy Store from August 2 to 4, 2019.

Darna was the first Filipino superhero to have this most sought-after licensed pop culture collectible. Funko replicated Darna's trademark look created by artist Nestor Redondo, complete with a red helmet that has a gold winged medallion to match her iconic two-piece red bikini that has gold stars on each brassiere cap; gold cuff bracelets; a gold medallion belt with a white loincloth in the middle; and red knee-high boots with golden lining. The Funko Darna launch comes nearly a month after Jane De Leon was announced as the lead for Star Cinema's movie on the superhero. ABS-CBN even had the new Darna, Jane De Leon, do a Funko Pop! unboxing video of the superhero. Darna Funko Pop!—under the heading, Ravelo Komiks Universe, listed as No. 23 in Funko Pop Comics— was released alongside a glow-in-the-dark edition of the barong-wearing Jollibee Funko Pop! in time for the Philippine Independence Day celebration in June.

Aside from the Darna Funko Pop! toy, other Darna collectibles are also available such as the Darna Card Game, statuettes, shirts, and other novelty items.

== Collected editions ==
Title	Volume	Issue	Date
Varga
Varga	Bulaklak Magazine Vol. 4	#1	1947-1948
Varga	Bulaklak Magazine	#17	July 23, 1947
Varga	Bulaklak Magazine p. 54	#43	May 12, 1948
Darna
Golden Age
Darna	Pilipino Komiks	#1-28	
Darna	Pilipino Komiks	#77	May 13, 1950
Darna	Pilipino Komiks	#78	May 27, 1950
Darna	Pilipino Komiks	#81	July 8, 1950
Darna	Pilipino Komiks	#87	September 30, 1950
Darna	Pilipino Komiks	#99	March 17, 1951
Darna	Pilipino Komiks	#112	September 15, 1951
Darna at ang Babaing Lawin	Pilipino Komiks	#109	August 1951
Darna at ang Babaing Lawin	Pilipino Komiks	#120	January 5, 1952
Darna at ang Babaing Lawin	Pilipino Komiks	#132	June 21, 1952
Darna at ang Impakta	Kenkoy Komiks		September 12, 1962 – 1963
Darna at ang Babaing Tuod	Liwayway Magazine		May 25, 1964 – 1965
Darna at ang Babaing Linta	Darna Komiks-Magasin	#1	February 3, 1968
Darna at ang Babaing Linta	Darna Komiks-Magasin	#3	March 3, 1968 – 1969
Darna	Darna Komiks-Magasin	#27	February 3, 1969
Darna at ang Planetman	Holiday Komiks-Magasin		October 1968 – 1969
Darna and the Time Machine	Kampeon Komiks		1975
Darna Versus Santanina Dayabolika	Kampeon Komiks		1977-1978
Darna and the Genie	Darna Komiks		January 8, 1980
Darna at ang Black Widow	Ravelo Magazine		February 14, 1980 – 1981
Darna vs. Dyangga	Darna Komiks		January 21, 1985
Darna at ang Taong Diablo			November 11, 1985
Modern Age (1986–present)
Darna at ang Hiwaga ng Nawawalang Hukay	Darna Komiks		June 1986
Darna at ang Taong Ibon	Darna Komiks	#964	October 12, 1987
Darna vs. the Warlock	Darna Komiks		June 25, 1990
Darna sa Gitna ng Pag-ibig at Panganib	Darna Komiks		August 3, 1991
Darna vs. Zumarna	Darna Komiks	#1217	August 17, 1992
Darna vs. Zumarna	Darna Komiks	#1275	September 27, 1993
Darna vs. the Black Mercury	Darna Komiks		February 14, 1994
Darna: Ang Pagbabalik	Darna Komiks		April–December 4, 1995
Darna vs. Araknido	Darna Komiks Magazine		August 12, 1996
Darna is back with a vengeance	Super Action	#1	
Darna at ang Toxic Monster	Super Action Komiks	#7	1999
Darna sa Bingit ng Panganib	Super Action Komiks		1999
Mars Ravelo's Darna (Extra Special Issue); Paano Kung May Tatlong Darna?	Super Action Vol. 2	#12	1999
Mars Ravelo's Darna at ang Mahiwagang Singsing	Super Action	#14	
	Super Action	#15	
Nag-Santa Claus Si Darna	Super Action Vol.2	#16	December 1999
Darna	Mango Comics miniseries	#1	February 28, 2003
Darna	Mango Comics miniseries	#2	May 7, 2003
Darna	Mango Comics miniseries	#3	December 13, 2003
Miscellaneous
Pilipino Komiks	Pilipino Komiks	#119	December 22, 1951

== See also ==
- List of Filipino superheroes
- Valentina
- Lastikman
- Varga
- Captain Barbell
