= Darna, Nepal =

Darna, Nepal दर्ना
- Rural municipality = Bannigadhi jayagadh Ward number = 06
- Location in Nepal
- Coordinates: 29.19°N 81.34°E
- Country: Nepal
- Zone: Seti Zone
- District: Achham District

Population (2001)
  - Total: 4,246
  - Religions: Hindu
- Time zone: UTC+5:45 (Nepal Time)

Darna is a small town in Achham District in the Seti Zone of western Nepal. At the time of the 1991 Nepal census, the village had a population of 4049 living in 715 houses. At the time of the 2001 Nepal census, the population was 4246, of which 36% was literate.
