= Polo Ravales =

Filipino actor and model

- Born: Paul Patrick Rodil Gruenberg; June 27, 1982 (age 44); Manila, Philippines
- Occupations: Actor, model
- Years active: 1996–present
- Spouse: Paulyn Quiza (m. 2026)
- Children: 1

Paul Patrick Rodil Gruenberg (born June 27, 1982), simply known as Polo Ravales, is a Filipino actor and model. Engaged to Paulyn Quiza, the couple had a son, Yatrick Paul (born September 5, 2021). He is a fitness coach and Managing Director of their International Manpower family business.

== Career ==
Ravales' first TV appearance came in 1996 as one of second batch members in the teen show T.G.I.S. He is a former VIVA contract star along with fellow GMA stars Sunshine Dizon, Dingdong Dantes and among others. A year later, he landed a small role in the drama series Anna Karenina as Vincent. Then followed by several soap series, Click, Ang Iibigin ay Ikaw, and Hanggang Kailan.

In 2005, he landed his first big role in the hit telefantasya series Encantadia as Hitano, which followed by Majika. He starred in a number of successful movies in the Philippines, including Blue Moon and Super Noypi. In 2008, he was Patrick Garcia's replacement for the role of Andy Abrigo in Sine Novela: Maging Akin Ka Lamang opposite Nadine Samonte. The role he reprised was originally played by Christopher de Leon and was his biggest break in TV. After this, he joins the cast of Gagambino. In 2009, Ravales played Shiro in Darna. Polo was part of the GMA Dramedy show, Adik Sa'Yo.

In 2010, Ravales appeared in Panday Kids. He was also seen in other GMA shows like Sine Novela: Basahang Ginto which he plays Anton, he guested in Claudine Presents: Love Thy Neighbor which he plays a rich driver with his co-stars Claudine Barreto, and former love team and now long-time friend Sunshine Dizon, and also recently seen on Grazilda, in which appears as Matthew Dominguez. In 2011, he joined a former Drama series Sinner or Saint. He began a new show on GMA, Hiram na Puso, which began airing on March 5, 2012. In 2014, he went back to acting in film for cinema playing the role of Franco, a violent husband in Of Sinners and Saints, directed by Fil-Italian director Ruben Maria Soriquez.

In 2015, Ravales was seen in Ipaglaban Mo! and FPJ's Ang Probinsyano which airs on ABS-CBN followed by the fourth season of Doble Kara.

In 2018, Ravales joined La Luna Sangre on ABS-CBN. Presently, November 2019, he reverted back to his home station GMA Network for the show Magkaagaw.

=== Business career ===
In 2025, Ravales entered into an industrial co-partnership with Vijay Gurung and Indian businesspersons, owners of Royal Indian Curry House with a branch in Eastwood City.

== Personal life ==
On May 24, 2026 Ravales married Paulyn Quiza, his long time girlfriend in a private wedding ceremony. The couple welcomed their son, Yatrick Paul in 2021.

== Filmography ==
=== Film ===
- Moises Arcangel: Sa Guhit ng Bala (1996)
- Honey, My Love, So Sweet (1999)
- Kiss Mo 'Ko (1999)
- Susmaryosep! Four Fathers (2001)
- Let the Love Begin (2005)
- Room Boy (2005)
- Blue Moon (2006)
- Manay Po (2006)
- Pacquiao: The Movie (2006)
- Super Noypi (2006)
- Silip (2007)
- Manay Po 2: Overload (2008)
- Loving You (2008)
- Walang Kawala (2008)
- Wapakman (2009)
- Of Sinners and Saints (2014)
- Angela Markado (2015)
- Balatkayo (2017)
- Amnesia Love (2018)
- Bato: The General Ronald dela Rosa Story (2019)
- Mamay: A Journey to Greatness (2024)
- Crosspoint (2024)

=== Television ===
Year	Title	Role	Notes
1995–1997	T.G.I.S.		Second Batch (June 1997 / November 1999)
1996–2002	Anna Karenina	Vincent	
1997	Jamming	Host	
1998	Ibang Klase	Various	
1998–1999	Halik sa Apoy	Ricky	
2000	GMA Love Stories	Various	
2000	Super Klenk	Various	
2000	Kakabakaba	Various	
2001	GMA Telecine Specials	Various	
2002	Click		
2002–2003	Ang Iibigin ay Ikaw	Tristan Villadolid	
2002	Maynila	Various	
2003	Ang Iibigin ay Ikaw Pa Rin	Tristan Villadolid	
2004	Hanggang Kailan	Monch	
2005	Encantadia	Hitano	
2005–2006	Now and Forever: Agos	Pablo	
2006	Majika	Ebrio	
2006	Now and Forever: Linlang	Paolo	
2006	Now and Forever: Dangal	Miguel	
2006	Baywalk	Various	
2007	Mga Kuwento ni Lola Basyang	Various	
2007	Lupin	Josh Apacer	
2007–2008	Sine Novela: Pasan Ko ang Daigdig	Tony	
2007–2008	La Vendetta	Gabby Trajano	
2008	Sine Novela: Maging Akin Ka Lamang	Andy Abrigo	
2008	Obra		
2008–2009	Carlo J. Caparas' Gagambino	Harold Santiago	
2008	Dear Friend		Episode Guest: "Igorota"
2009	Adik Sa'Yo	Himself	
2009	Dear Friend	Michael	Episode Guest: "Kay Tagal Kitang Hinintay"
2009–2010	Mars Ravelo's Darna	Shiro	
2010	Carlo J. Caparas' Panday Kids	Cicero	
2010	Diz Iz It	Himself / Guest Celebrity Judge	
2010	Sine Novela: Basahang Ginto	Anton	
2010	Claudine	Various	Episode Guest: "Love Your Neighbor"
2010–2011	Grazilda	Matthew Dominguez	
2010–2013	Party Pilipinas	Himself / Performer	
2011	Pablo S. Gomez's Machete	Zander	
2011	Magic Palayok	Richard "Kardo" Cruz	
2011	Sinner or Saint	Alvin	
2012	Bubble Gang	Himself	
2012	Hiram na Puso	Dennis	
2013	Unforgettable	Arnold Regalado	
2013	Pyra: Babaeng Apoy	Tito	
2013	Sunday All Stars	Himself	
2014	Kambal Sirena	Ataba	
2014	Ilustrado	Venchito Monteverde	
2015	Ipaglaban Mo	Dario	Episode Guest: "Sa Mata Ng Bata"
2015	Ipaglaban Mo	Edwin	Episode Guest: "Pagmamahalang Hinadlangan"
2015	FPJ's Ang Probinsyano	Brad	
2016	Magpakailanman	Ricky	Episode Guest: "Tiyahin Ko, Karibal Ko"
2016	ASAP	Himself	Co-host / Performer
2016	Doble Kara	Julio Hernandez	
2017	Wansapanataym	Edgar	Episode Guest: "My Hair Lady"
2017–2018	La Luna Sangre	Erin	
2017–2019	Taddy Taddy Po	Marcus	
2018	Pepito Manaloto	Kiko Manuel	
2019	Ipaglaban Mo	Ian Morales	Episode Guest: "Kubli"
2019	Tadhana	Steve	Episode Guest: "Marital Rape"
2019–2021	Magkaagaw	Oliver De Villa / Aldo	
2021	First Yaya	Secretary Ordoñez	
2021	Stories from the Heart: Loving Miss Bridgette	Tristan Enriquez	
2023–2024	Lovers & Liars	Ronnie San Diego	
2024	Black Rider	Anselmo De Vera-Libanan	
2024	All-Out Sundays	Himself	
2024	Pamilya Sagrado	Eric Marquez	
2025	Incognito	Emilio "Emil" Manalastas	
2025	Rainbow Rumble	Himself	Contestant
2026	Paskong Pinoy		Episode: "The Last New Year in Boracay"
2026	The Master Cutter	Paldo	Supporting cast
