= Ruben Maria Soriquez =

Filipino-Italian actor, director and producer

- Born: August 2, 1971 (age 55); Bologna, Italy
- Occupations: Actor; Director; Producer
- Years active: 2007–present
- Spouse: Lanie Martin Gumarang
- Children: Filippo Leonard Soriquez; Kim Soriquez

Ruben Maria Soriquez (born August 2, 1971) is a Filipino-Italian film actor, director and producer.

== Early life and education ==
Soriquez was born on August 2, 1971. His father is Filipino and his mother is Italian. He graduated from the University of Bologna with a degree in Human Resources. In 2007, he took a filmmaking course organized by the New York Film Academy in Florence and studied script-writing and editing in New York. He obtained a diploma in acting at Colli Theatre School in 2008.

== Film and TV career ==
=== 2011–2013: Debut in Italy ===
After making his directorial debut with the documentary Montovolo: History, Nature and Legend in 2011, Soriquez directed Sexocracy: The Man of Bunga Bunga , a documentary feature film based on an interview with Lele Mora, which was released in May 2012. It received a nomination for Best Documentary at the 2012 New York City International Film Festival.

In 2013, He directed The Broken Crown, a co-production between Italy, Germany, and the Philippines, with a cast including Andrea Roncato , Tony Sperandeo , Horst Janson, Massimo Bonetti , Manuela Morabito, and Ron Williams.

=== 2013–2019: Acting and Directing in the Philippines ===
Ruben moved to the Philippines in late 2013, where he founded See Thru Pictures, Inc., a film production and distribution company. With See Thru Pictures, Soriquez produced the movie Of Sinners and Saints in 2015. Acting alongside him were Raymond Bagatsing, Polo Ravales, Richard Quan, and Althea Vega. For his lead role in the movie, Soriquez won Best Actor in the 2015 World Premieres Film Festival He got his first television drama role in Dolce Amore in 2016, playing Roberto Marchesa, the adoptive father of Liza Soberano's character, Serena. In 2017, he appeared in two Star Cinema films: Can't Help Falling in Love starring Kathryn Bernardo and Daniel Padilla and Unexpectedly Yours starring Robin Padilla and Sharon Cuneta. In 2019, Ruben Maria Soriquez appeared in the action TV series The General's Daughter, playing the role of weapons smuggler David Pascal .

=== 2007–2021: as Producer ===
Since 2007, Soriquez has produced several feature films and TV movies , (including the horror films: Arachnicide and Dead Gamers both directed by Italian director Paolo Bertola). He is one of the few contemporary filmmakers to produce and direct silent films (A Perfect Family and The Silent Killer the latter scored by Italian composer Franco Eco) to be premiered at the International Silent Film Festival Manila. On May 7, 2021, TubiTV released his controversial documentary film Pandemiocracy

=== International Film and TV scene ===
In 2018, Soriquez joined the cast of the TV series General Commander, starring Steven Seagal, with the role of the mafioso Santino Amato. In the following year, four films in which he stars (Of Sinners and Saints, The Spiders' Man , The Lease and Entrapped) were released in the US. In 2025 Soriquez as Signor Rossi, is in the cast of the Hollywood film The Last Resort directed by Donald Petrie, starring Daisy Ridley, Alden Ehrenreich and Sam Neill.

=== Representing Italy through Films ===
Between 2015 and 2018 Ruben Maria Soriquez was a board member of the ICCPI Italian Chamber of Commerce in The Philippines Inc., promoting the Culture of Italy in South East Asia especially in The Philippines. In 2017, with the ICCPI, the Dante Alighieri Society of Manila and the Embassy of Italy in Manila, he founded The Venice Film Festival in Manila, an Italian Film Festival that screened in Manila a selection of Italian Films of the Venice Film Festival 2016. The festival changed its name to "Italian Cinema: from Venice to Manila" for the 2018 edition where Italian films from the Venice Film Festival 2017 were screened. In 2016 his film Of Sinners and Saints represented Italy together with the film My Friends (film) of Mario Monicelli at the 19th Cine Europa in Manila. In 2017 his contemporary Silent film A Perfect Family represented Italy at the 11th International Silent Film Festival Manila and his 2020 silent film The Silent Killer was one of the two Italian entries to the 14th International Silent Film Festival Manila

=== EPIFF European Philippine International Film Festival ===
Ruben Maria Soriquez founded the European Philippine International Film Festival EPIFF in 2017 with Maurizio Baldini e Lorenzo Galanti. The first two editions of EPIFF took place in Florence, Italy in March 2018 and May 2019, while the 2020 and 2021 editions took place online due to the COVID-19 pandemic. The 4th edition (2021) has been partnered by See Thru Pictures, Film Philippines Incentives, FDCP, NCCA, Sentro Rizal. Among the films showcased was Milan produced by Philippines' largest network ABS-CBN.

== Personal life ==
In 2013, Soriquez settled in the Philippines with his wife, Lanie Martin Gumarang, and their children.

== Filmography ==
=== Films ===
Year	Title	Role	Studio	Notes	Ref.
2011	Sexocracy: The man of Bunga Bunga	narrator	—N/a	as Director, Associate Producer and Film Editor	
2013	The Broken Crown	—N/a	—N/a	as Director, Writer, Executive Producer, Film Editor, Cinematographer, and Camera Operator	
2015	Of Sinners and Saints	Father Leonardo	See Thru Pictures	as Actor, Director, Writer, Executive Producer and Film Editor	
2017	Can't Help Falling in Love	Cristofano	Star Cinema	as Actor	
2017	A Perfect Family	Father	See Thru Pictures	as Actor, Director	
2017	Unexpectedly Yours	Ricardo Alvarez	Star Cinema	as Actor	
2018	The Lease	Romano Gonzales	Utmost Creative	as Actor	
2018	The Spiders' Man	Alberto Medina	See Thru Pictures	as Actor, Director	
2019	Entrapped: a day of terror	Nar	See Thru Pictures	as Actor, Co_Producer	
2020	The Silent Killer	Father Ruben	See Thru Pictures, iWatchMore Originals	as Actor, Director, Producer	
2021	Pandemiocracy	Father	Leomark Studios	as Actor, Director, Producer	
2025	The Immortal Hunters: The Renegade	Vladimir	See Thru Pictures	as Actor	
2026	The Marianas Web				
2027	The Last Resort	Signor Rossi	Asia Pacific Films	Post-production	

=== Television ===
Year	Title	Role	Network	Notes	Ref.
2015	Kano Luvs Pinay	Italian husband	TV5		
2016	Dolce Amore	Roberto Marchesa	ABS-CBN		
2017	Tadhana: Millionaire Maid	Antonio De Luca	GMA Network		
2018	General Commander	Santino Amato	Saradan Media		
2019	The General's Daughter	David Pascal	ABS-CBN		
2021	Pandemiocracy	Father Ruben	TubiTv		
2023	The Rain in España	Jake	Viva Communications Inc.		
2023	The Iron Heart	Marcus	Kapamilya Channel; A2Z; TV5		
2026	A Secret in Prague	Viktor Valtrovi	TV5; Kapamilya Channel; A2Z; ALLTV2		

== Accolades ==
Year	Award-giving Body	Category	Notable Works	Result	Ref.
2015	World Premieres Film Festival, PH	Best Performance by an Actor (Filipino New Cinema Award)	Of Sinners and Saints	Won	
2015	World Film Awards, INDONESIA	Achievement in Specific Category (Actor)	Of Sinners and Saints	Won	
2015	Accolade Competition, US	Leading Actor	Of Sinners and Saints	Won	
2015	Terra di Siena Film Festival, ITA	Best Film	Of Sinners and Saints	Nominated	
2016	International Independent Film Awards, US	Best Actor in a Leading Role (Joint winner with Emerson Smith)	Of Sinners and Saints	Won	
2016	Honolulu Film Awards, US	Best Film	Of Sinners and Saints	Won	
2017	Indian World Film Festival, INDIA	Best Actor	Of Sinners and Saints	Won	
2017	Los Angeles Independent Film Festival Awards	Best Actor	Of Sinners and Saints	Won	
2017	Los Angeles Independent Film Festival Awards	Best Feature	Of Sinners and Saints	Won	
2019	Olympus Film Festival, US	Best Dark Comedy Feature	The Spiders' Man	Won	
2019	Olympus Film Festival, US	Best Ensemble Cast	The Spiders' Man	Won	
2019	Madrid International Film Festival, ES	Best Editing in a Foreign Language Film	The Spiders' Man	Nominated	
2019	International Independent Film Awards, US	Directing	The Spiders' Man	Won	
2019	International Independent Film Awards, US	Best Narrative Feature	The Spiders' Man	Won	
2020	Asia Pacific International Filmmaker Festival & Awards	Best Director	The Spiders' Man	Won	
2020	Accolade Competition, US	Best Supporting Actor	The Spiders' Man	Won	
2021	Los Angeles Independent Film Festival Awards	Best Documentary Feature	Pandemiocracy	Won	
2022	Global India International Film Festival	Best Direction Award	Of Sinners and Saints	Won	
