= Isabel Oli =

Filipino actor and model (born 1981)

- Born: Maria Olivia Daytia; October 20, 1981 (age 44); Cebu City, Philippines
- Other names: Olive Oli, Liv Oli
- Education: University of San Jose–Recoletos
- Occupations: Actress, model
- Years active: 2004–present
- Agents: Sparkle GMA Artist Center (2005–2014) Star Magic; (2004–2005; 2014–present)
- Spouse: John Prats (m. 2015)
- Children: 3
- Relatives: Camille Prats (sister-in-law)

Chinese name
- Traditional Chinese: 蘇心心
- Simplified Chinese: 苏心心
Transcriptions
Standard Mandarin
- Hanyu Pinyin: Sū Xīn Xīn
- Bopomofo: ㄙㄨㄒㄧㄣㄒㄧㄣ
- Wade–Giles: Su^{1} Xin^{1} Xin^{1}
Southern Min
- Hokkien POJ: So͘ Sim-sim

Maria Olivia Daytia-Prats (born October 20, 1981), better known by the screen name Isabel Oli, is a Filipina model and actress.

== Background ==
Oli is the youngest of seven children to a Filipino father of Chinese descent and a Filipina mother of Spanish descent. She finished her secondary education at Cebu Eastern College and her tertiary education at the University of San Jose-Recoletos (Cebu) with a degree in Information Technology. She gained media attention in 2004 when she landed a role in a Max's Restaurant commercial.

In 2004, she started her acting career in ABS-CBN via It Might Be You and Maalaala Mo Kaya episode with Baron Geisler and her soon-to-be spouse John Prats, before moving to GMA Network in 2005.

It was her similarly named role of Isabel, the leading lady to matinee idol, Richard Gutierrez in Sugo, that launched her to full stardom. Her exposure on Sugo also landed her a role on the GMA Films' summer 2006 offering Moments of Love. Her face currently graces the covers of glossy magazines, billboards and print ads, and appears regularly on GMA Network shows. The latter portrayed the antagonistic Rosita, originally played by award-winning actress Lorna Tolentino, in Sine Novela: Maging Akin Ka Lamang. She then appeared in Gagambino, opposite Dennis Trillo.

In 2009, she played Iza Calzado's antagonist in her second Sine Novela, Kaya Kong Abutin Ang Langit. Oli also played the much-coveted role of Elaine in the Philippine Version of the Korean 2004 television series, Full House. Isabel Oli is part of the cast for the movie Rosario, an MMFF 2010 entry to be shown on December 25, 2010. In 2014, Oli returned to ABS-CBN to appear in the special finale participation as Chef Bernadette Cruz in Annaliza.

== Personal life ==
On September 24, 2014, her long-time boyfriend, actor John Prats, organized a flash mob and proposed to her in Eastwood City.

On May 16, 2015, Prats and Oli married in Batangas. They welcomed their first child, a daughter, on April 18, 2016.

On June 26, 2018 they announced the gender of their second baby on their Youtube channel (Pratty TV) and it is revealed to be a boy. He was born on November 25, 2018.

== Filmography ==
=== Film ===
Year	Title	Role
2006	Moments of Love	Ava
2010	You to Me Are Everything	Megan
2010	Rosario	Carmen
2014	English Only, Please	Megan Montañer
2015	Beauty and the Bestie	Wila
2025	Only We Know	Dana

=== Television ===
Year	Title	Role
2004	It Might Be You	Aretha (credited as Olivia Daytia)
2004	Maalaala Mo Kaya: Trolley	Imelda
2005–2006	Sugo	Isabel
2005–2006	Love to Love Season 9	Arlene
2006	I Luv NY	Wendy
2006	Love to Love Season 11	Cristy / Tintin
2006	Atlantika	Alona
2007	Mga Mata ni Anghelita	Teresa
2007	Mga Kuwento ni Lola Basyang	Selinda
2008	Sine Novela: Maging Akin Ka Lamang	Rosita Monteverde
2008–2009	Carlo J. Caparas' Gagambino	Bernadette Albuento / Alakdanessa
2009	Suddenly Its Magic!	Tesa
2009	Dear Friend: Bakasyonista	Gina
2009	Rosalinda	Austerica Carvajal
2009	Sine Novela: Kaya Kong Abutin Ang Langit	Therese Gardamonte
2009–2010	Full House	Elaine Villavicencio
2009–2010	SOP Rules	Herself
2010	Party Pilipinas	Herself
2011	Captain Barbell: Ang Pagbabalik	Melanie Ocampo
2011	Daldalita	May
2012	Faithfully	Megan Briones
2012	Sports Pilipinas	
2012	Day Off	
2013	Forever	Monica "Monique" Del Prado
2013	Magkano Ba ang Pag-ibig?	Atty. Richelle Mangahas
2014	Annaliza	Chef Bernadette Cruz
2014	Ipaglaban Mo: Ako Ang Nauna	Rosa
2014	ASAP	Herself / Guest
2014	It's Showtime	Herself / Guest Hurado
2014	The Singing Bee	Herself / Guest Player
2014	Banana Split	Herself
2014	It's Showtime Holy Week Special	
2014	Wansapanataym Presents: My App Boyfie	Young Stella Tuason
2015	Maalaala Mo Kaya: Takure	Maricar
2015	Pablo S. Gomez's Inday Bote	young & adult Lita Vargas
2015	Ipaglaban Mo: Dahil Mahal Mo Siya	Rebecca
2015	Bridges of Love	Atty. Malaya Cabrera
2016	Maalaala Mo Kaya: Anino	Marites
2018	Ipaglaban Mo: Ate	Lisa
2018	Since I Found You	Alliya "Iya" Capistrano-Samontina
2024	Lilet Matias: Attorney-at-Law	young Meredith "Mer" Magbanua- Simmons
2024	Ang Himala ni Niño: Unang Libro ng Niña Niño	Hershey

== Awards ==
Year	Award giving body	Category	Nominated work	Results
2009	1st MTRCB TV Awards	Female Star of the Night	—N/a	Won
