= Karen delos Reyes =

Filipino actress

Karen Delos Reyes
- Born: Glomirose Delos Reyes; September 29, 1984 (age 41); Las Piñas, Philippines
- Other names: Karen, Karen Delos Reyes
- Occupations: Actress, comedian
- Years active: 2001–2016; 2022–present
- Agent: GMA Artist Center (2002–2016; 2022–present)

Karen De los Reyes (born Glomirose Delos Reyes on September 29, 1984) is a Filipino actress and comedian. Karen became famous because of a McDonald's ad. She started her acting career when she joined the cast of Click on GMA Network. She was known as Savanna in the hit fantasy series Mulawin.

== Filmography ==
=== Television ===
Year	Title	Role	Type of role
2002–2004	Click	Rowena "Weng" / "Weena" Abergas	Main Cast
2002–2003	Ang Iibigin ay Ikaw	Elmina Sandoval	Main Cast / Protagonist
2003	Ang Iibigin ay Ikaw Pa Rin	Elmina Sandoval	Main Cast / Protagonist / Antagonist
2003–2004	Narito ang Puso Ko	Fake Antonina / Luzviminda Bautista	Main Cast / Antagonist
2004–2005	Mulawin	Savannah Montenegro	Supporting role / Antagonist
2004	Love to Love: Kissing Beauty	Ynez	Episode role / Antagonist
2005	Mars Ravelo's Darna	Alice / Babaeng Tuod / Babaeng Impakta / Babaeng Lobo	Supporting role / Protagonist / Antagonist
2007	Sine Novela: Pati Ba Pintig ng Puso	Sosima	Supporting role / Protagonist
2007	Mga Kwento ni Lola Basyang: Anting Anting		Episode role
2007–2008	Sine Novela: Pasan Ko ang Daigdig	Sosima	Supporting role / Protagonist
2007–2008	Zaido: Pulis Pangkalawakan	Ederlyn	Extended role / Antagonist
2007	La Vendetta	Andrea	Guest role
2008	Codename: Asero	Cleo Marasigan	Extended role / Antagonist
2009	Adik Sa'Yo	Young Fatima	Special Participation
2009	Stairway to Heaven	Bernadette "Badet" Mallari	Supporting role / Protagonist
2010	The Last Prince	Minnie	Supporting role / Protagonist
2010	Survivor Philippines	Herself / Castaway	
2011	Pablo S. Gomez's Machete	Bugana	Supporting role / Antagonist
2012	Luna Blanca	young Tetchie	Recurring role / Antagonist
2012	Extra Challenge	Celebrity Challenger	
2013	Magpakailanman	Candy	Episode role
2015	Karelasyon: Instant Baby	Rowena	Episode role
2015	Karelasyon: Gayuma	Clarissa	Main role
2016	Karelasyon: Bisita	Katie	Episode role
2016	Dear Uge: Faking Girls	Ashley Cruz	Episode role / Antagonist
2022	Wish Ko Lang: Christmas Wish	Dorothy	Episode role / Antagonist
2023	Wish Ko Lang: Abusada	Melanie	Episode role / Antagonist
2024	Maka	Pilar Salonga	Guest role / Antagonist
2024	Wish Ko Lang: Pinalo ng Kapitbahay	Meldy	Main role / Antagonist
2025	Tadhana: Old Maid	Kristel	Main role / Protagonist
2025	Lolong: Pangil ng Maynila	Jaya	Guest Cast / Antagonist

=== Film ===
Year	Title	Role
2006	I Will Always Love You	Theresa/Tessa (Cecille's friend)
2011	Six Degrees of Separation from Lilia Cuntapay	Special Appearance
2016	Sakaling Hindi Makarating	Gina
2016	Die Beautiful	TV Studio Host
