= Maging Akin Ka Lamang (TV series) =

2008 Philippine television drama series

- Title card
- Also known as: Till You are Mine
- Genre: Romantic drama
- Based on: Maging Akin Ka Lamang (1987) by Lino Brocka
- Written by: Luningning Interino-Ribay; Kit Villanueva-Langit
- Directed by: Gil Tejada Jr.
- Starring: Nadine Samonte; Polo Ravales
- Theme music composer: Tata Betita
- Opening theme: "Maging Akin Ka Lamang" by Jonalyn Viray
- Country of origin: Philippines
- Original language: Tagalog
- No. of episodes: 78

Production
- Executive producer: Camille Gomba-Montaño
- Camera setup: Multiple-camera setup
- Running time: 25–35 minutes
- Production company: GMA Entertainment TV

Original release
- Network: GMA Network
- Release: January 21 – May 9, 2008

Maging Akin Ka Lamang (transl. just become mine / international title: Till You are Mine) is a 2008 Philippine television drama romance series broadcast by GMA Network. Based on a 1987 Philippine film of the same title, the series is the sixth instalment of Sine Novela. Directed by Gil Tejada Jr., it stars Nadine Samonte and Polo Ravales. It premiered on January 21, 2008 on the network's Dramarama sa Hapon line up. The series concluded on May 9, 2008, with a total of 78 episodes.

== Cast and characters ==
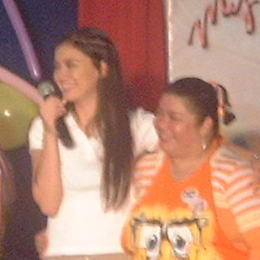
Nadine Samonte (left) portrays Elsa Paruel.

Lead cast

- Nadine Samonte as Elsa Paruel-Abrigo
- Polo Ravales as Andy Abrigo

Supporting cast

- Isabel Oli as Rosita Monteverde
- Carlo Aquino as Ernie Balboa
- Mike Tan as Rick Rivera
- Jacob Rica as Adrian Monteverde
- Alicia Alonzo as Leticia Paruel
- Pinky Amador as Carmen Paruel
- Dexter Doria as Aida Abrigo
- Arci Muñoz as Olivia "Olive" Paruel
- Juan Rodrigo as Augusto Monteverde

== Production ==
Principal photography commenced on January 5, 2008.

== Ratings ==
According to AGB Nielsen Philippines' Mega Manila household television ratings, the pilot episode of Maging Akin Ka Lamang earned a 21.5% rating. The final episode scored a 23.4% rating.

== Accolades ==
Accolades received by Maging Akin Ka Lamang
Year	Award	Category	Recipient	Result	Ref.
2008	22nd PMPC Star Awards for Television	Best Daytime Drama Series	Maging Akin Ka Lamang	Nominated	
