= The Master Cutter =

2026 Philippine television drama series

- Season 2 title card
- Also known as: The Master Cutter: Anak ng Sinulid
- Genre: Action; Drama
- Directed by: Dominic Zapata
- Creative director: Aloy Adlawan
- Starring: Dingdong Dantes
- Theme music composer: Dominic Zapata
- Country of origin: Philippines
- Original language: Tagalog
- No. of seasons: 2
- No. of episodes: 140 (list of episodes)

Production
- Executive producer: Nieva Magpayo
- Production locations: Baclaran; Bataan; Palawan
- Camera setup: Multiple-camera setup
- Production company: GMA Entertainment Group

Original release
- Network: Netflix
- Release: May 8, 2026 – present
- Network: GMA Network
- Release: May 11, 2026 – present

The Master Cutter is a 2026 Philippine television drama action series streaming on Netflix and broadcast by GMA Network. Directed by Dominic Zapata, it stars Dingdong Dantes in the title role. The series first premiered on Netflix on May 8, 2026. The television broadcast premiered on May 11, 2026 on GMA Network's Prime line up.

The series is streaming online on YouTube.

== Premise ==
Anthony is a former scout ranger who has turned into a tailor by daytime operating in Baclaran, and a secret bounty hunter by night as double life. When he takes in a girl, only to realize she is his daughter connected to a crime syndicate.

== Cast and characters ==
Cast

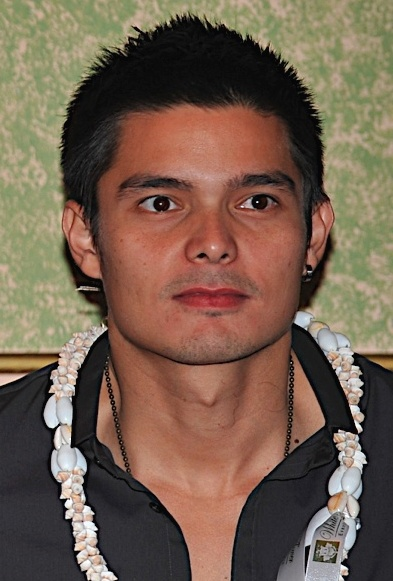
Dingdong Dantes

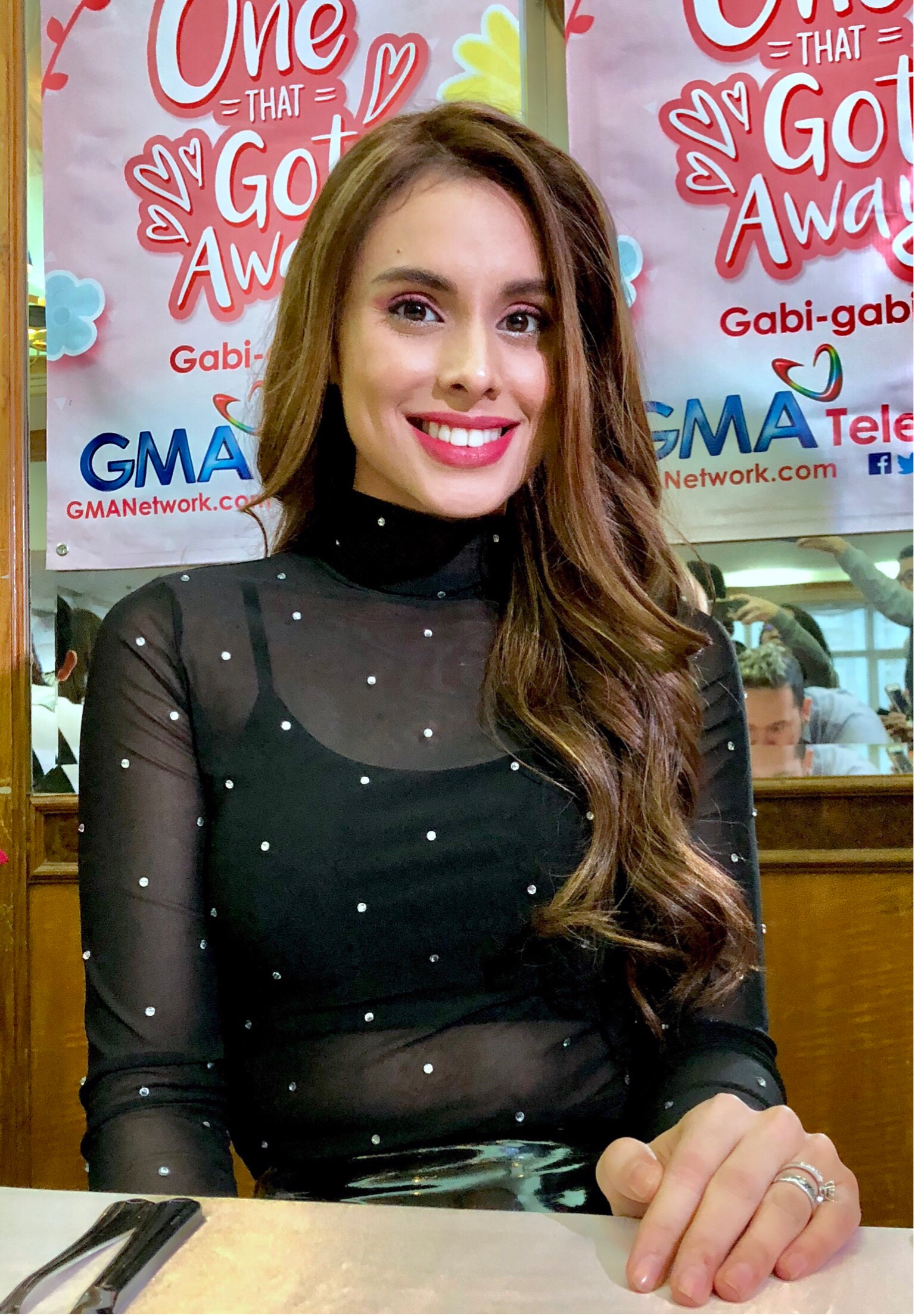
Max Collins

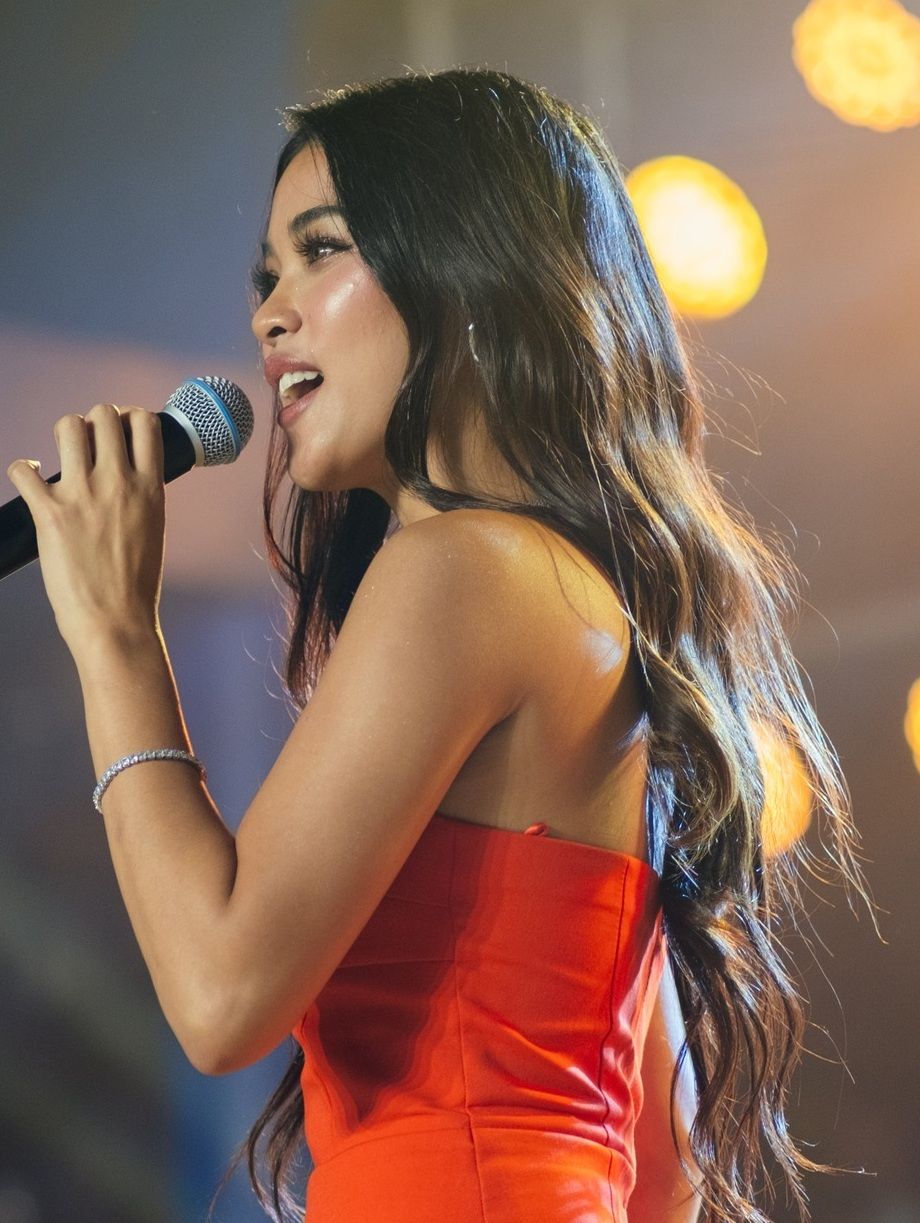
Shuvee Etrata

Lead cast

- Dingdong Dantes as Anthony "Atoy" Padua

Supporting cast

- Max Collins as Elaine / Audrey
- Shuvee Etrata as Tonet
- Jo Berry as Ame
- Sienna Stevens as Ibyang
- Tonton Gutierrez as Dmitri Regalia
- Rio Locsin as Cita
- Joey Marquez as Delfin
- Paolo Contis as Red Regalia
- Ketchup Eusebio as Emerson
- Polo Ravales as Paldo
- Max Eigenmann as Martina Regalia
- Charlie Fleming
- Prince Carlos
- Anthony Constantino
- Ericca Laude as Janine

Guest cast

- Michael Roy Jornales
- Jennylyn Mercado as Olga
- Herlene Budol
- Ahtisa Manalo
- Tom Rodriguez as Oscar "Oca" Asuncion
- Benjie Paras
- Andre Paras

== Seasons ==
Season	Episodes	Originally released	
Season	Episodes	First released	Last released
1	112	May 8, 2026 (Note: Season 1 premiered on GMA Network on May 11, 2026.)	October 13, 2026
2	8	October 11, 2026 (Note: Season 2 premiered on GMA Network on October 14, 2026.)	TBA

== Production ==
The series and its cast members were announced in August 2025. Principal photography commenced on August 27, 2025. Filming took place in Baclaran, Parañaque, Palawan and Bataan.

== Release ==
The Master Cutter was originally set to premiere on Netflix on April 17, 2026. In April 2026, it was delayed to May 8, 2026. The television broadcast of GMA Network started on May 11, 2026. The second season premiered on Netflix on October 11, 2026, with the television broadcast on GMA Network on October 14, 2026.

== Ratings ==
According to AGB Nielsen Philippines' Nationwide Urban Television Audience Measurement People in television homes, the pilot episode of The Master Cutter earned a 10.5% rating.
