= Ang Iibigin ay Ikaw =

Philippine television drama series

- Title card
- Also known as: My One and Only Love
- Genre: Romantic drama
- Created by: Jimmy Duavit
- Developed by: Gina Marissa Tagasa-Gil
- Written by: Gina Marissa Tagasa-Gil
- Directed by: Joyce Bernal; Lore Reyes
- Starring: Christopher de Leon; Alice Dixson; Richard Gomez
- Theme music composer: Jimmy Borja
- Opening theme: "Ang Iibigin ay Ikaw" by Lani Misalucha
- Country of origin: Philippines
- Original language: Tagalog
- No. of episodes: 200

Production
- Executive producer: Marjorie La Chica
- Cinematography: Joe Tutanes
- Camera setup: Multiple-camera setup
- Running time: 30 minutes
- Production company: GMA Entertainment TV

Original release
- Network: GMA Network
- Release: July 15, 2002 – April 11, 2003

Related
- Ang Iibigin ay Ikaw Pa Rin

Ang Iibigin ay Ikaw (transl. the beloved is you / international title: My One and Only Love) is a Philippine television drama romance series broadcast by GMA Network. Directed by Joyce Bernal and Lore Reyes, it stars Christopher de Leon, Alice Dixson and Richard Gomez. It premiered on July 15, 2002. The series concluded on April 11, 2003, with a total of 200 episodes.

== Cast and characters ==
Cast

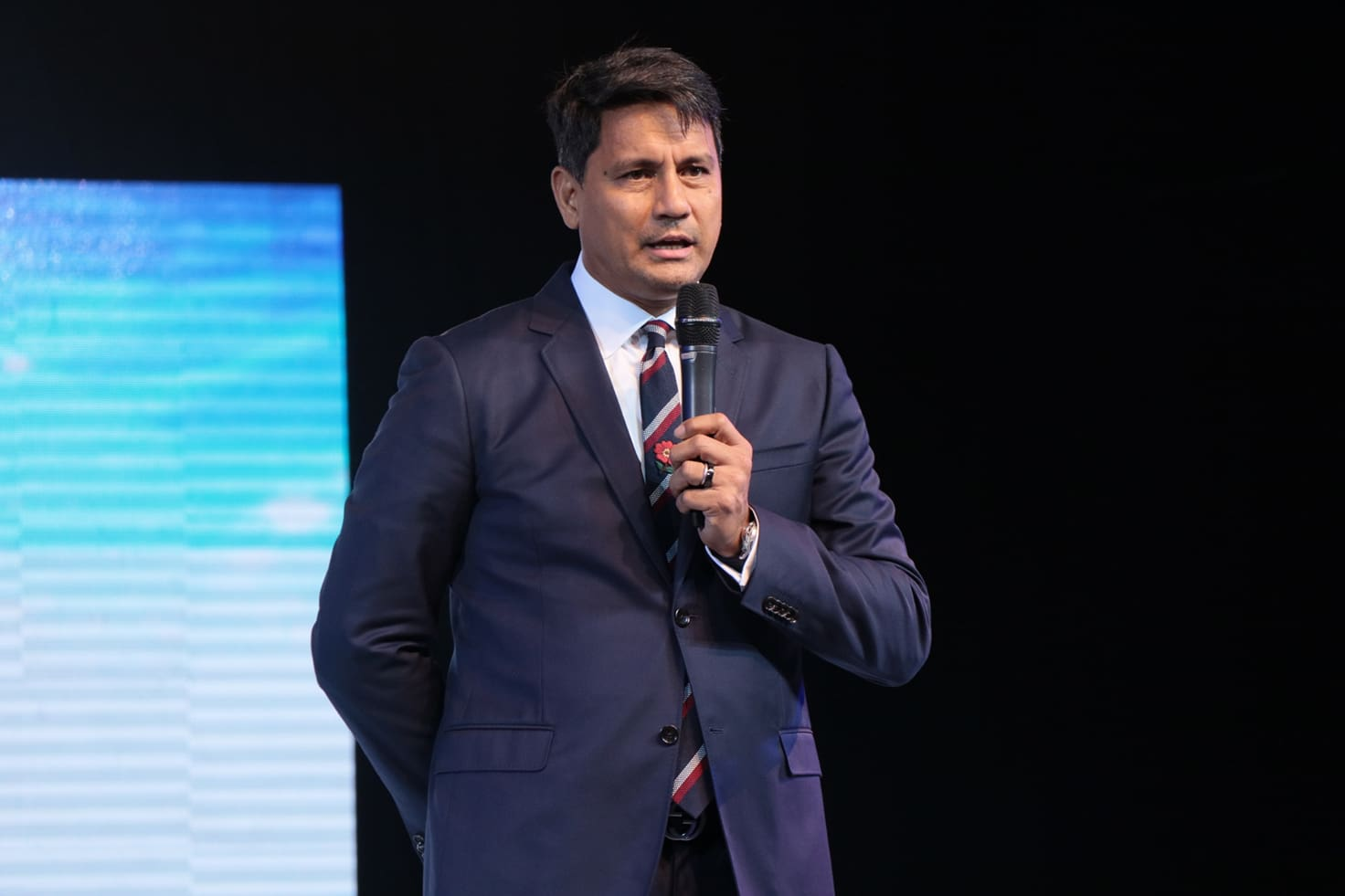
Richard Gomez

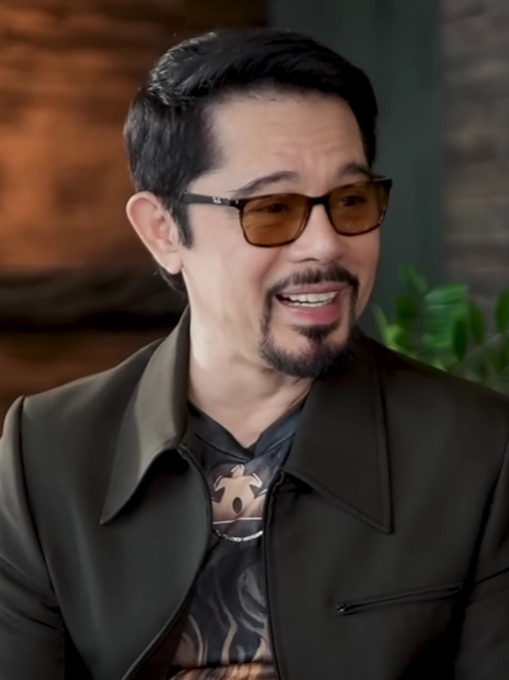
Christopher de Leon

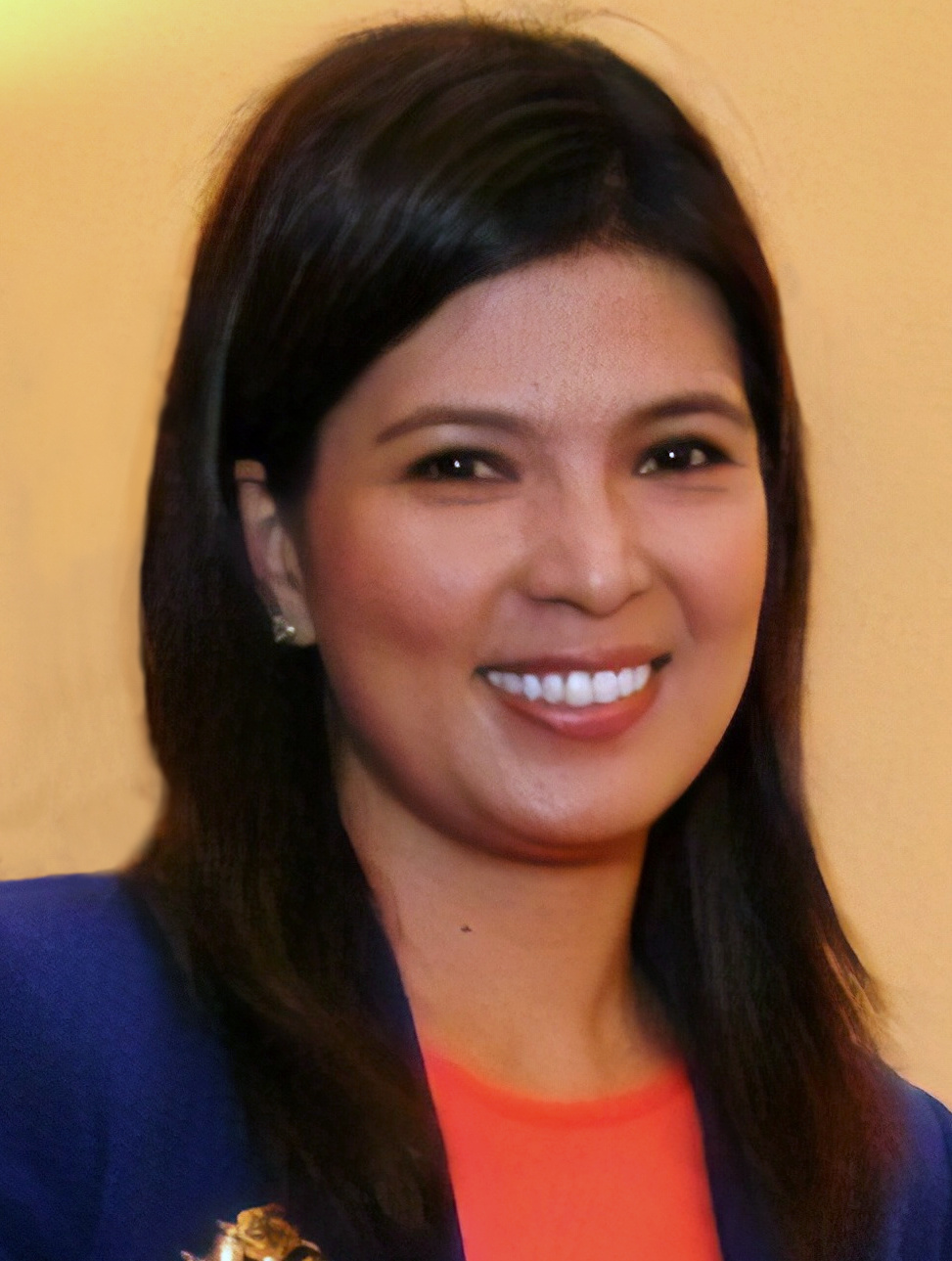
Lani Mercado

Lead cast

- Richard Gomez as Waldo Sandoval
- Alice Dixson as Mia Sandoval
- Christopher de Leon as Lemuel Verder

Supporting cast

- Lani Mercado as Madonna Verder
- Barbara Perez as Salud Verder
- Boots Anson-Roa as Feliza
- Jackie Lou Blanco as Sabrina Villadolid
- Rio Locsin as Cita Almendraz
- Mark Gil as Enrico Villadolid
- Rosa Rosal as Lucing
- Bembol Roco as Oscar
- Rufa Mae Quinto as Liberty "Libay"
- Karen delos Reyes as Elmina Sandoval
- Chubi del Rosario as Anthony Verder
- Polo Ravales as Tristan Villadolid
- Krista Ranillo as Scarlet

Guest cast

- Anne Curtis as Rosanna Luarca
- Angel Locsin as Mariella Sandoval
- Johnny Revilla as Rodolfo Luarca
- AJ Eigenmann as Marcel Almendras
- Rey Emmanuel de Guzman as Daniel
- Valerie Concepcion as Lilian Almendras
- Mely Tagasa as Miling
- Lady Lee as Anna
- Ross Berenguel as Ivan
- Tommy Abuel as Atty. Cruz
- Anthony Roquel as Papu
- Armando Goyena as Donato Verder
- Cris Daluz as Roberto
- Empress Schuck as younger Elmina
- Brian Homecillo as younger Marcel
- Louise delos Reyes as younger Stella
- Vangie Labalan as Yolanda Lujan
- Champagne Morales as Stella
- Aiza Marquez as Yasmin
