= Tinik sa Dibdib =

Philippine television drama series

- Title card
- Also known as: Damage
- Genre: Drama
- Based on: Tinik sa Dibdib (1985) by Leroy Salvador
- Directed by: Gil Tejada Jr.
- Starring: Sunshine Dizon; Nadine Samonte; Marvin Agustin
- Theme music composer: Arnenio Mendaros
- Opening theme: "Kasalanan Nga Ba?" by Gretchen Espina
- Country of origin: Philippines
- Original language: Tagalog
- No. of episodes: 85

Production
- Executive producer: Camille Gomba-Montaño
- Camera setup: Multiple-camera setup
- Running time: 30–45 minutes
- Production company: GMA Entertainment TV

Original release
- Network: GMA Network
- Release: September 28, 2009 – January 22, 2010

Tinik sa Dibdib (transl. thorn in the chest / international title: Damage) is a Philippine television drama series broadcast by GMA Network. Based on a 1985 Philippine film of the same title, the series is the seventeenth installment of Sine Novela. Directed by Gil Tejada Jr., it stars Sunshine Dizon, Nadine Samonte and Marvin Agustin. It premiered on September 28, 2009, on the network's Dramarama sa Hapon line up. The series concluded on January 22, 2010, with a total of 85 episodes.

== Cast and characters ==
Cast

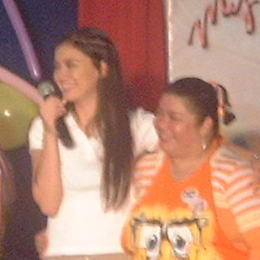
Nadine Samonte (left)

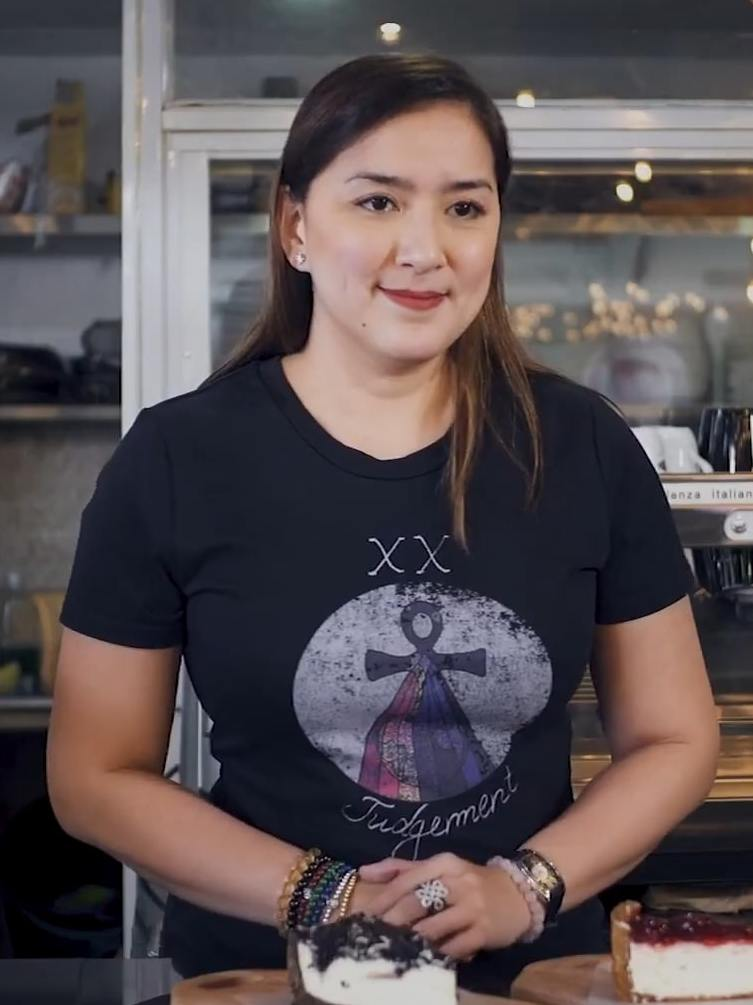
Ara Mina

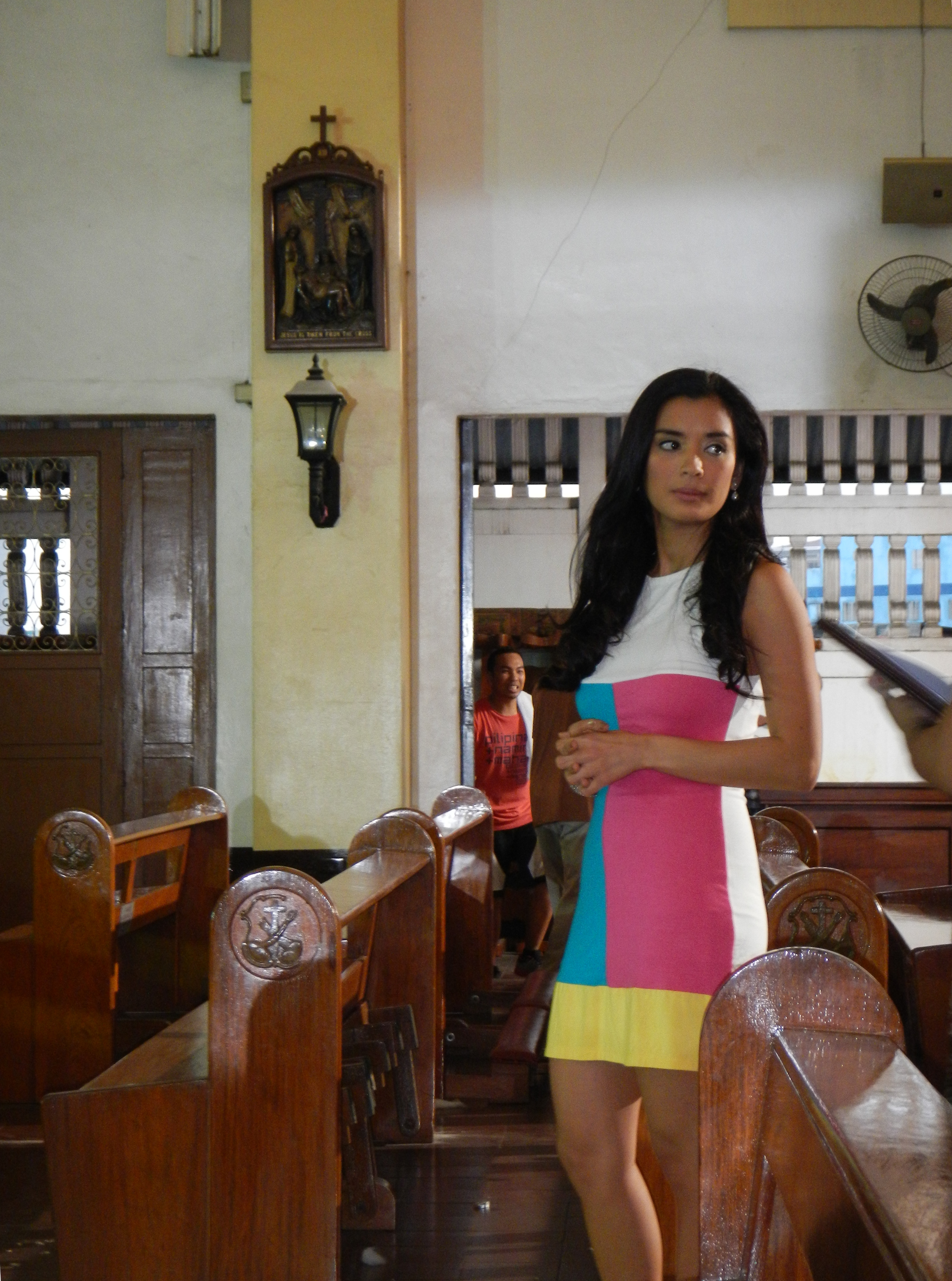
Michelle Madrigal

Lead cast

- Sunshine Dizon and Nadine Samonte as Lorna Yadao-Domingo / Danica
- Marvin Agustin as Rolando "Lando" Domingo

Supporting cast

- Sheryl Cruz as Rita Domingo
- Ara Mina as Trixie Domingo
- Michelle Madrigal as Moret Yadao / Corazon Domingo
- Bembol Roco as Tiburcio "Tibo" Yadao
- Daria Ramirez as Candida "Diday" Yadao
- Andrea del Rosario as Divine
- Carlo Aquino as Ruden
- Jenny Miller as Nini Reyes
- Tiya Pusit as Manda
- Marco Alcaraz as Paolo Ramirez
- Maybelyn dela Cruz as Choleng
- Jen Rosendahl as Lucy
- Miguel Tanfelix as Boyito Domingo

Guest cast

- Anita Linda as Luisa
- Rico Barrera as Victor
- Deborah Sun as Emily Tupaz
- Sandy Reyes as young Angelita Domingo

== Casting ==
In October 2009, actress Nadine Samonte replaced Sunshine Dizon in the series.

== Ratings ==
According to AGB Nielsen Philippines' Mega Manila household television ratings, the pilot episode of Tinik sa Dibdib earned a 7.4% rating. The final episode scored a 17.5% rating.
