= List of The Master Cutter episodes =

The Master Cutter is a Philippine action drama television series airing on GMA Network. It aired on the network's Prime line up.

== Series overview ==
Season	Episodes	Originally released	
Season	Episodes	First released	Last released
1	112	May 8, 2026 (Note: Season 1 premiered on GMA Network on May 11, 2026)	October 13, 2026
2	63	October 11, 2026 (Note: Season 2 premiered on GMA Network on October 14, 2026)	January 8, 2027

== Episode table ==
=== Season 1 ===
No. overall	No. in season	Title	Original air date (Note: Netflix shows three episodes in advance.)
1	1	"Pilot"	May 11, 2026
Atoy recovers a nuclear device from arms dealer Merelli and presses on with his assignment on a distant island, while a shadowy instructor follows close behind.
2	2	"Target Locked"	May 12, 2026
Merelli reappears on Cogon Island, leaving Atoy to adapt on the fly without his usual strike team. At the same time, Elaine begins probing into the life of the man next door.
3	3	"Back in Town"	May 13, 2026
Atoy arrives at Elaine’s empty home and finds only his necklace remaining. Returning to Baclaran, he stands up for his godsister Karla before confronting his father, Delfin.
4	4	"Missing Saint"	May 14, 2026
Flooded by memories, Atoy revisits the family tailoring shop and attempts to rebuild ties with his father. Elsewhere, a holy statue vanishes.
5	5	"Master Tracker"	May 15, 2026
Wrongly blamed for the theft of a sacred statue, Atoy opens his own inquiry to identify the true thief and clear his name.
6	6	"Special Delivery"	May 18, 2026
Atoy’s probe into the missing San Antonio de Padua statue lands him in a dangerous trucking compound.
7	7	"Retrieval"	May 19, 2026
Atoy risks everything in a bid to reclaim the statue and restore it to the church, only to receive crushing news about his father afterward.
8	8	"Hit and Run"	May 20, 2026
Atoy and his father finally repair their relationship at the tailoring shop, but the trucking-compound syndicate soon arrives seeking payback.
9	9	"Partners in Crime"	May 21, 2026
Eight years later, Atoy has become the neighborhood’s skilled master cutter, continuing the family trade—yet unfinished matters still await him.
10	10	"To the Rescue"	May 22, 2026
After saving a young pickpocket from drowning, Atoy softens and promises to help her locate a friend who has vanished without explanation.
11	11	"Ang Probinsya"	May 25, 2026
While hunting for Ibyang’s missing friend, Atoy encounters Tonet, an attractive newcomer who arrives at the tailoring shop seeking a room to rent.
12	12	"Underground Fight"	May 26, 2026
The hunt for Ame brings Atoy to Endless Nights karaoke bar, where he confronts a longtime enemy linked to his father’s killing.
13	13	"New Hire"	May 27, 2026
Atoy barely slips away from his enemy at the karaoke bar. Back at the shop, Cita hires Tonet as a sewing assistant.
14	14	"Sneak"	May 28, 2026
Atoy succeeds in slipping into the karaoke bar to look for Ame, but Ibyang’s parallel search for her friend almost exposes him.
15	15	"Only Way Out"	May 29, 2026
Working undercover inside Endless Nights, Atoy uncovers key details that edge him closer to locating Ame.
16	16	"Riot"	June 1, 2026
Atoy finally reaches the VIP area of Endless Nights. Meanwhile, Red’s enforcer hunts the streets to settle a score on his boss’s orders.
17	17	"Secret Room"	June 2, 2026
Atoy asks Ibyang to keep a concealed room in the tailoring shop confidential. At the same time, one of Red’s VIP clients sets his sights on Ame with plans to take her to Japan.
18	18	"The VIP"	June 3, 2026
Disguised, Atoy penetrates the VIP section of Endless Nights, where Ame is being held.
19	19	"Fight to the Death"	June 4, 2026
Still undercover, Atoy makes contact with Ame inside the VIP area, but one of Red’s clients endangers the rescue.
20	20	"Car Chase"	June 5, 2026
As Ibyang readies herself to leave, Atoy finds it hard to release the fatherly attachment he has formed with the young girl.
21	21	"New Housemates"	June 8, 2026
Lonely Atoy receives a pleasant surprise when two familiar faces turn up at the tailoring shop. Later, an old flame makes an unexpected return.
22	22	"Rooster Case"	June 9, 2026
After reuniting Ame with Ibyang, Atoy shifts focus to his covert assignment of locating a valuable fighting rooster called Draco. Ame soon demonstrates her value.
23	23	"The Magicians"	June 10, 2026
Having reunited Ame and Ibyang, Atoy returns to the secret task of recovering the prized fighting rooster Draco, with Ame quickly showing her usefulness.
24	24	"Getaway"	June 11, 2026
Atoy recovers the valuable rooster and hands it back to its owner, Dmitri—a man with whom he shares an unexpected long-standing link.
25	25	"Tracking Atoy"	June 12, 2026
Ignoring her father’s objections, Elaine travels back to Isla Cogon in search of Atoy. Once there, she encounters an old acquaintance as memories resurface.
26	26	"Missing"	June 15, 2026
Father Peping asks Atoy to locate Queenie, a local girl who has suddenly disappeared. Meanwhile, Elaine’s search finally yields results.
27	27	"Big Secret"	June 16, 2026
Atoy steps up his efforts to find the missing girls from the barangay. At the same time, Elaine visits a Baclaran church and nearly crosses paths with him.
28	28	"My Big Brother"	June 17, 2026
Tonet confides in Emerson about their shared history. Meanwhile, Atoy digs into a dating app that the missing women used before vanishing.
29	29	"Ibyang's Past"	June 18, 2026
Atoy’s suspect in the missing-girls case manages to escape. Later, he learns Ibyang cannot read and promises to teach her once the investigation ends.
30	30	"Rock and Roll"	June 19, 2026
Elaine reaches out to Mr. Mercado, Atoy’s superior in the tracking work. Meanwhile, Atoy confronts his suspect at a rock concert.
31	31	"No Escape"	June 22, 2026
Atoy exposes the person responsible for a series of disappearances that targeted the devoted fans of a rock star.
32	32	"Team Up"	June 23, 2026
Atoy saves Tonet and one of her friends while relentlessly chasing the serial kidnapper preying on local women.
33	33	"The Meetup"	June 24, 2026
Eight years after their intense romance on Isla Cogon, Atoy and Elaine meet again, rekindling emotions neither has fully left behind.
34	34	"Truth is Out"	June 25, 2026
Heartbroken, Atoy and Elaine part ways—yet a shattering revelation tied to her eight-year-old coma alters everything.
35	35	"School Girl"	June 26, 2026
Dmitri orders Red and Martina to locate Audrey’s child. Meanwhile, Atoy enrolls Ibyang in school so she can learn to read.
36	36	"First Day of School"	June 29, 2026
Audrey erupts in fury upon discovering her child is missing. At the same time, Atoy tracks down the former head of the orphanage that once took Ibyang in.
37	37	"The Nun"	June 30, 2026
Atoy disguises himself as a nun to gain an audience with Sister Norma, while Red and Martina attempt a similar approach.
38	38	"Chance Encounter"	July 1, 2026
Atoy slips into the convent and wins Sister Norma’s trust after helping extinguish a fire. Elsewhere, Ibyang and Audrey unexpectedly meet.
39	39	"Bell Tower"	July 2, 2026
Atoy and Ruel clash with candelabras in a violent struggle to reach Sister Norma, a fight that carries lasting consequences.
40	40	"Finding Ibyang"	July 3, 2026
Atoy comes home bearing distressing news for Ibyang. Elsewhere, Martina tries to purchase information about Audrey’s child.
41	41	"Got You"	July 6, 2026
Martina arranges a shady deal with an orphan’s adoptive mother. Meanwhile, Atoy shields Ibyang from a cruel bully.
42	42	"New Home"	July 7, 2026
Audrey at last comes face-to-face with her missing daughter. At the same time, Atoy accepts a job protecting a girl from her own father.
43	43	"Horror House"	July 8, 2026
While completing his assignment, Atoy comes to understand that a devoted father will go to any length—even killing—to safeguard his daughter.
44	44	"Lover's Quarrel"	July 9, 2026
After breaking up a fight between Janine and Ibyang, Atoy begins to sense the secret Audrey is keeping from him.
45	45	"Dressmaker"	July 10, 2026
Quiet tension builds between Audrey and Tonet, while Atoy finally finds time to sew Ibyang a gown for a beauty pageant.
46	46	"Little Beauty Queen"	July 13, 2026
A bully sabotages Ibyang’s beauty-pageant performance. Meanwhile, Audrey and Tonet keep quarreling over lipstick.
47	47	"Dance with My Tatoy"	July 14, 2026
Atoy swiftly intervenes to spare Ibyang from humiliation. Back home, he starts treating her more like a father.
48	48	"Mother's Instinct"	July 15, 2026
Janine’s behavior irritates Audrey, stirring feelings she cannot explain. Meanwhile, Atoy reaches a pivotal decision regarding Ibyang.
49	49	"Street Vendor"	July 16, 2026
While looking for Janine, Audrey runs into Atoy as he tracks a car thief and confides a secret to him.
50	50	"Saving Janine"	July 17, 2026
After rescuing Janine, Atoy prepares to disclose the truth, but Audrey stops him, worried about how the girl will react.
51	51	"Surprise Visitor"	July 20, 2026
Atoy goes to the Regalia house expecting to talk with Audrey about Janine’s future, only to come face-to-face with Red.
52	52	"Debate for Custody"	July 21, 2026
Dmitri takes an unexpected position after overhearing a dispute over Janine’s custody. Meanwhile, Red grows uneasy about Atoy’s ties to the Regalia family.
53	53	"Ibyang's Poem"	July 22, 2026
Ibyang tries to conceal her jealousy over Atoy’s bond with Janine, but he reassures her that his love for her remains constant and absolute.
54	54	"Sleep Over"	July 23, 2026
Mario takes firm steps to resolve his troubles. Chiara returns and confers with Ruiz, formulating a plan to counter La Morte Bianca’s next action.
55	55	"Blood Donation"	July 24, 2026
Ibyang and Janine compete to brew the perfect cup of coffee for Atoy, and a prank only deepens the strain between them.
56	56	"Piko"	July 27, 2026
Atoy and Ibyang reconcile, and she agrees to befriend Janine once more. Meanwhile, Tonet consults a specialist about a puzzling blood-type discrepancy.
57	57	"Valuable Information"	July 28, 2026
Tonet arrives at the Regalia mansion seeking Audrey, but Martina and Red promptly throw her out. Elsewhere, Emerson narrowly escapes a serious accident.
58	58	"Cornered"	July 29, 2026
With a murderous Red pursuing her, Tonet frantically searches the mall for Atoy and begs for his protection.
59	59	"Tonet"	July 30, 2026
While Atoy catches the thieves who stole Emerson’s wallet, Tonet and Martina engage in a bloody confrontation inside an empty store.
60	60	"Missing Stud"	July 31, 2026
As Karla, Ame, and Ibyang mourn their loss, a grieving Atoy examines the crime scene and uncovers a vital clue that could lead him to the killer.
61	61	"Dress for Tonet"	August 3, 2026
At the wake, Atoy shares his discoveries with Emerson. Meanwhile, Red and Martina quarrel over their next steps and how to hide their involvement.
62	62	"Hard Truth"	August 4, 2026
Audrey informs Atoy of her conclusion that Martina is innocent. Elsewhere, Emerson leaves a meeting with Atoy and a lawyer feeling disappointed.
63	63	"The Getaway"	August 5, 2026
Atoy surprises Audrey and Janine by bringing an unexpected guest to their island holiday. Later, a rescue operation turns into a moment of reconciliation.
64	64	"The Kiss"	August 6, 2026
Ibyang and Janine play matchmaker. Later, Audrey confronts Leon, and Atoy intervenes at a critical moment.
65	65	"Muling Ibalik"	August 7, 2026
Ibyang takes the opportunity to offer Atoy romantic advice, which he later puts into practice with Audrey that same night.
66	66	"Snake Bite"	August 10, 2026
Audrey and Atoy discover Janine unconscious from a snake bite. Meanwhile, Cita’s husband Noel confides a long-kept secret to Karla.
67	67	"Atoy's Decision"	August 11, 2026
Audrey presses Atoy to make an impossible choice between Janine and Ibyang. At the same time, Cita begs Karla to protect their secret.
68	68	"Family Dinner"	August 12, 2026
Dmitri urges Audrey to invite Atoy to dinner. Meanwhile, a local resident discovers Atoy’s hidden line of work.
69	69	"Foreign Duo"	August 13, 2026
Dmitri cautions Red to prepare for the day the truth about Delfin’s death emerges. Later, Atoy devises a plan to infiltrate the Zahran Embassy.
70	70	"Infiltration"	August 14, 2026
Audrey cannot understand why Atoy has not contacted her since the family dinner, while he and Kuya Kurt struggle to escape the embassy.
71	71	"Embassy"	August 17, 2026
Audrey apologizes to Ibyang. Meanwhile, Atoy enlists Emerson’s help for another attempt to infiltrate the Zahran Embassy.
72	72	"Master Cleaner"	August 18, 2026
Atoy and Emerson put their lives on the line in a high-stakes mission to recover a laptop holding critical national-security data.
73	73	"Accomplice"	August 19, 2026
Audrey intervenes to help Atoy escape the embassy. Meanwhile, Paldo deserts Red’s group, placing himself in personal danger.
74	74	"True Killer"	August 20, 2026
When Paldo confesses, Atoy at last learns the real circumstances of his father’s death. Later, Ibyang is involved in an accident.
75	75	"Atoy vs Red"	August 21, 2026
Atoy sets out to avenge his father by pursuing Red, but the plan collapses when he accidentally harms the wrong man.
76	76	"Audrey's Decision"	August 24, 2026
Audrey confronts Atoy about Dmitri’s accusation. He denies it and urges her to run away with him, but she refuses. His family gathers as his life unravels.
77	77	"Fabric of Truth"	August 25, 2026
Gavin confronts Karla about what happened to Red, and the two exchange bitter words. Meanwhile, a scarf in Cita’s bag sparks Atoy’s memory of betrayal.
78	78	"Almost a Kiss"	August 26, 2026
Karla discloses a shattering family secret that forces Atoy into drastic measures. Elsewhere, an unwelcome visitor interrupts Ame and Sister Norma’s meeting.
79	79	"Meet Olga"	August 27, 2026
Martina and Red hire impostors to pose as Ibyang’s mother and Sister Norma’s niece; the deception uncovers an unexpected link to Atoy’s past.
80	80	"Nanay-nanayarn"	August 28, 2026
Olga earnestly tries to persuade Ibyang to live with her, and DNA-test results appear to support her claim.
81	81	"Tatoy Ko"	August 31, 2026
After a painful goodbye, a grieving Atoy and Emerson resolve to move forward—until an agent arrives with the embassy laptop.
82	82	"New Tracker"	September 1, 2026
Ibyang notices a sharp change in Olga’s behavior toward her. Emerson and Cita encounter two clients who require the Master Cutter’s specialized skills.
83	83	TBA	September 2, 2026
Emerson, Karla, Kuya Kurt, and Ame plot to recover luggage stuffed with stolen cash at an auction, but Atoy objects to one particularly risky element of the plan.
84	84	TBA	September 3, 2026
Emerson disregards Atoy’s warnings and brings Karla along on the auction mission. Meanwhile, a series of mishaps hits Olga’s workplace.
85	85	TBA	September 4, 2026
The team reaches the hotel, and a surprised Emerson adds Gavin to the operation. Ibyang feels guilty as Olga’s acting ambitions fall apart.
86	86	TBA	September 7, 2026
87	87	TBA	September 8, 2026
88	88	TBA	September 9, 2026
89	89	TBA	September 10, 2026
90	90	TBA	September 11, 2026
91	91	TBA	September 14, 2026
92	92	TBA	September 15, 2026
93	93	TBA	September 16, 2026
94	94	TBA	September 17, 2026
95	95	TBA	September 18, 2026
96	96	TBA	September 21, 2026
97	97	TBA	September 22, 2026
98	98	TBA	September 23, 2026
99	99	TBA	September 24, 2026
100	100	TBA	September 25, 2026
101	101	TBA	September 28, 2026
102	102	TBA	September 29, 2026
103	103	TBA	September 30, 2026
104	104	TBA	October 1, 2026
105	105	TBA	October 2, 2026
106	106	TBA	October 5, 2026
107	107	TBA	October 6, 2026
108	108	TBA	October 7, 2026
109	109	TBA	October 8, 2026
110	110	TBA	October 9, 2026
111	111	TBA	October 12, 2026
112	112	TBA	October 13, 2026

=== Season 2 ===
No. overall	No. in season	Title	Original air date (Note: Netflix shows three episodes in advance.)
113	1	TBA	October 14, 2026
114	2	TBA	October 15, 2026
115	3	TBA	October 16, 2026
116	4	TBA	October 19, 2026
117	5	TBA	October 20, 2026
118	6	TBA	October 21, 2026
119	7	TBA	October 22, 2026
120	8	TBA	October 23, 2026
121	9	TBA	October 26, 2026
122	10	TBA	October 27, 2026
123	11	TBA	October 28, 2026
124	12	TBA	October 29, 2026
125	13	TBA	October 30, 2026
126	14	TBA	November 2, 2026
127	15	TBA	November 3, 2026
128	16	TBA	November 4, 2026
129	17	TBA	November 5, 2026
130	18	TBA	November 6, 2026
131	19	TBA	November 9, 2026
132	20	TBA	November 10, 2026
133	21	TBA	November 11, 2026
134	22	TBA	November 12, 2026
135	23	TBA	November 13, 2026
136	24	TBA	November 16, 2026
137	25	TBA	November 17, 2026
138	26	TBA	November 18, 2026
139	27	TBA	November 19, 2026
