= Super Noypi =

- Directed by: Quark Henares
- Screenplay by: Fairlane Raymundo; Enzo Valdez; Blood Masaya
- Story by: Roselle Monteverde-Teo; Fairlane Raymundo; Enzo Valdez; Edzon Rapisora
- Produced by: Lily Y. Monteverde
- Starring: John Prats; Sandara Park; Polo Ravales; Katrina Halili; Jennylyn Mercado; Mark Herras
- Cinematography: Jessie Pastor; Lyle Sacris
- Edited by: John Wong
- Music by: Malek Lopez; Erwin Romulo
- Production companies: Regal Multimedia Inc. GMA Films
- Distributed by: Regal Films
- Release date: December 25, 2006
- Running time: 111 minutes
- Country: Philippines
- Language: Filipino
- Box office: ₱19 million

Super Noypi is a 2006 Filipino action superhero fantasy film released on December 25, 2006, directed by Quark Henares and produced by Regal Films. It was an official entry to the 32nd Metro Manila Film Festival. This was the last movie appearance of Sandara Park throughout her showbiz career in the Philippines.

== Plot ==
Six normal childhood friends bound together by friendship find themselves faced with a shocking revelation – their parents are the legendary Super Noypi, the most powerful superheroes in the land! But now they are in danger, taken hostage by the wicked super-villain Diego (Monsour del Rosario). One by one, the six friends discover their super powers: the ability to move objects with their mind, becoming invisible at will, having superhuman strength and speed, transforming into any shape imaginable, casting spells and controlling fire and ice.

With the help of a strong and spirited stranger from the future named Lia (Jennylyn Mercado), who claims that the world as we know it will cease to exist if they don’t stop Diego now, Lorenzo Valdez (Mark Herras), Annys Valdez (Katrina Halili), Yñigo Raymundo (John Prats), Euen Rapisora (Polo Ravales), Michie Rapisora (Sandara Park), and Tonton Valdez (Andrew Muhlach) stick together, taking a stand against evil in order to save the world and the people they love the most.

== Cast ==
- John Prats as Yñigo Raymundo: Yñigo is the son of legendary aswangs. He has superhuman strength and speed and transforms into his aswang form whenever there is a threat of danger. He is funny, witty and happy-go-lucky. He breaks up with Annys after he finds out her true identity.
- Polo Ravales as Euen Rapisora: Euen is the eldest son of the strongest wizards and witches. A rocker at heart, he is always locking horns with his younger sister who loves all things pink. Upon discovery of their superhero lineage, Euen also inherits a spell book, which enables him to cast magic spells.
- Sandara Park as Michie Rapisora: Michie is the younger sister of Euen who is almost always at odds with her brother. She is perky, a bit vain but also absolutely lovable. She inherits a magical staff that enables her to control and create fire and ice.
- Katrina Halili as Annys Valdez / Cassandra Azaren: Annys is the younger sister of Lorenzo and the girlfriend of Yñigo. She can become invisible at will and also has the power of premonition, When the truth that she is the actual daughter of Diego was revealed, she stole Euen's spell book to throw up in the sky so her father would blast the spell book off.
- Mark Herras as Lorenzo Valdez: Lorenzo is the eldest son of the most powerful superheroes. When their father left years ago, he stood as the head of the family and helped his mother take care of his two younger siblings. He has telekinetic powers and is the leader and the strongest among the new breed of Super Noypi.
- Jennylyn Mercado as Lia: Lia is a master of martial arts and a rebel from the year 2075 who travels back through time to find a way to defeat the dictator and super-villain Diego. She tries to change the course of history by looking for the descendants of the greatest superheroes the country has ever known.
- Andrew Muhlach as Tonton Valdez: Tonton is the youngest brother of Lorenzo and Annys, and also the baby of the group. A typical kid, he is playful and sometimes mischievous. As his older siblings and their friends begin to discover their new powers, he finds himself not having any and feels kind of left out. But in the end, he finds out that he has one of the mightiest and most overwhelming powers of all.
- Monsour del Rosario as Diego Azaren: Diego is a technology genius who rose from the ranks and became the most evil and powerful dictator the country has known. He has made it his personal mission to wipe out the Super Noypi and their descendants.

=== Other cast ===
- Aubrey Miles as Laurana X / Diane Azaren
- Dino Imperial as Harvey / Arclight Man
- Jao Mapa as Henry Valdez
- Jennifer Sevilla as Nannette Valdez
- Mon Confiado as Sammy Raymundo
- Karla Estrada as Thelma Raymundo
- Richard Quan as Richard Rapisora
- Kookoo Gonzales as Kathryn Rapisora
- Allan Paule as Lia's Father
- Bing Pimentel as Lia's Mother

== See also ==
- List of Filipino superheroes
