= The Last Resort (2027 film) =

Upcoming Philippine romantic comedy film directed by Donald Petrie

- Directed by: Donald Petrie
- Written by: Karen McCullah
- Produced by: Ernesto Sta. Maria Jr.; Raja Collins
- Starring: Daisy Ridley; Alden Ehrenreich; Jo Koy; Beck Bennett; Tia Carrere; Sam Neill
- Cinematography: Russell Carpenter
- Edited by: Patrick J. Don Vito
- Music by: Josh Atchley; Denise Santos
- Production company: Asia Pacific Films (MVP Group)
- Distributed by: Voltage Pictures; Vertical
- Release date: 2027
- Country: Philippines
- Language: English
- Budget: $30 million

The Last Resort is an upcoming Philippine romantic comedy film directed by Donald Petrie and written by Karen McCullah. It stars Daisy Ridley and Alden Ehrenreich.

== Premise ==
A hotel executive named Brooke was sent to the Philippines for a resort location scouting. There she meets a charming charter pilot, Ben. She has to decide whether to return home or stay with Ben.

== Cast ==
- Daisy Ridley as Brooke
- Alden Ehrenreich as Ben
- Tia Carrere as Reyna
- Sam Neill as Gerard, Brooke's father
- Mylene Dizon
- Tetchie Agbayani as Jasmin
- Tonton Gutierrez
- Dylan Menor
- Ryrie Sophia
- Ricci Chan
- Jo Koy
- Beck Bennett as Nate
- Vondie Curtis-Hall as Sam
- Ruben Maria Soriquez as Signor Rossi

== Production ==
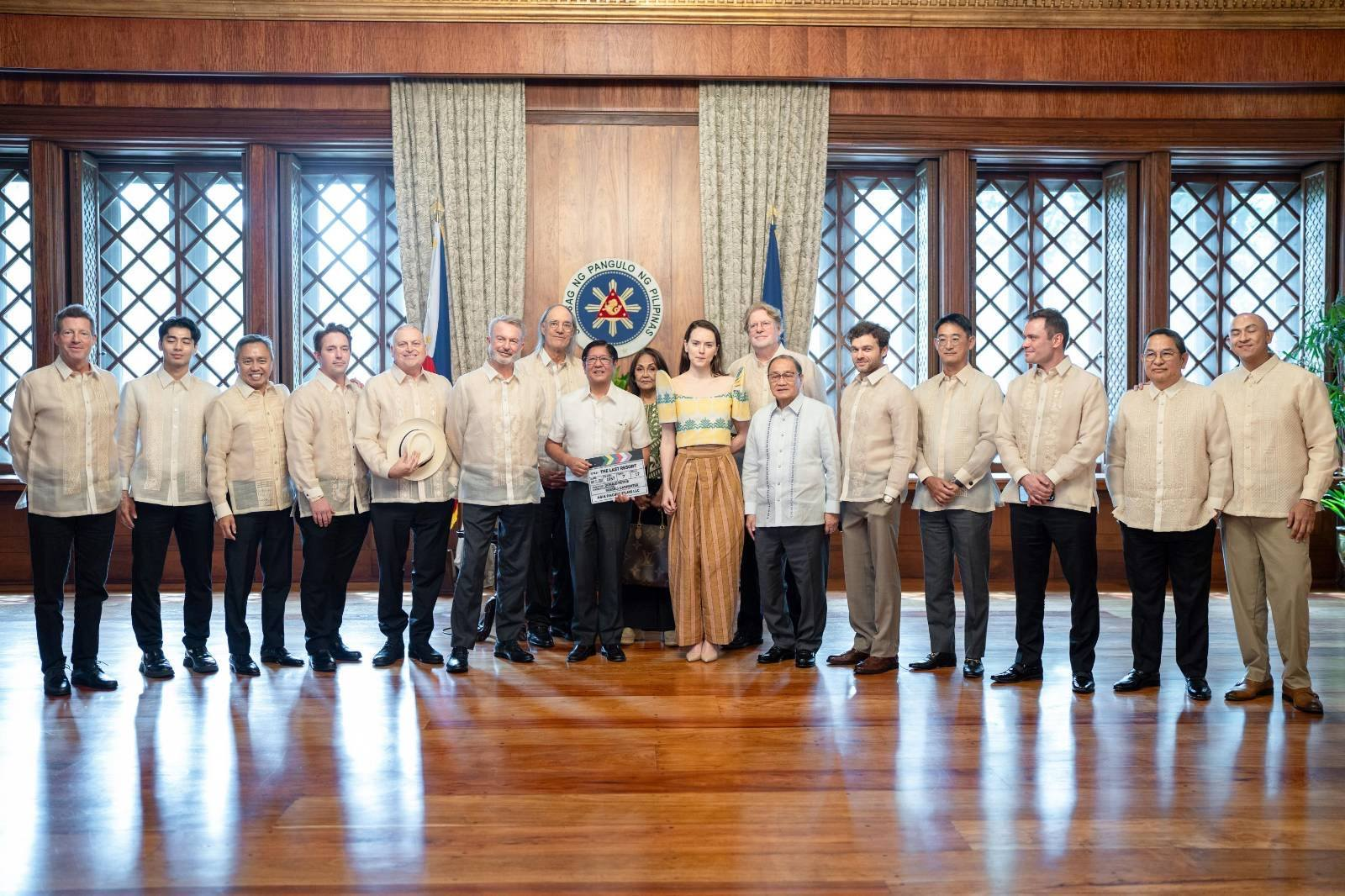
Philippine President Bongbong Marcos greets the cast and crew of The Last Resort at Malacañang Palace on May 21, 2025.

In January 2025, it was reported that a romantic comedy film directed by Donald Petrie and written by Karen McCullah was in development and will be shot in the Philippines. In March, Daisy Ridley and Alden Ehrenreich were cast in the lead roles as Brooke and Ben. Principal photography started in April 2025 in El Nido, Palawan. Filipino casts have been announced to play in the film. In April, Tia Carrere has been cast as Reyna in the film. In the same month, Jo Koy has been cast in the film. Filming locations included Cebu, Oslob, Las Casas Filipinas de Acuzar in Bagac, and Bonifacio Global City in Metro Manila.

Later that month, New Zealand actor Sam Neill was reported to join the cast while filming in the Philippines. He plays Brooke’s father, a powerful business tycoon who owns a chain of resorts. “He’s a powerful business guy. He probably owns a lot of resorts… and I loved working with this cast,” Neill explained. Through his Instagram post, new cast member Beck Bennett was also confirmed. Filming wrapped on May 28, 2025 when the cast celebrated in a wrap party in Pasig on May 27, 2025.

== Release ==
In May 2026, Voltage Pictures and Vertical acquired the worldwide distribution rights to the film, with the film scheduled to be released in 2027.
