= Of Sinners and Saints =

- Film poster
- Directed by: Ruben Maria Soriquez
- Written by: Alejandro Mirasol Ramos; Ruben Maria Soriquez
- Starring: Raymond Bagatsing; Ruben Maria Soriquez; Polo Ravales; Chanel LaTorre; Althea Vega; Richard Quan; Sue Prado
- Cinematography: Apollo Anao
- Music by: Franco Eco
- Production company: Eco.Logica.Mente
- Distributed by: See Thru Pictures, Inc.
- Release dates: June 27, 2015 (WPFF); April 28, 2017 (Cine Lokal)
- Country: Philippines

Of Sinners and Saints is a 2015 Philippine thriller film co-written and directed by Filipino Italian filmmaker Ruben Maria Soriquez on his directorial debut. The film stars Soriquez, Raymond Bagatsing, Polo Ravales, and Sue Prado.

== Cast ==
- Ruben Maria Soriquez as Leonardo Rossellini: Italian missionary doing his mission work in the Philippines
- Chanel Latorre as Merlinda: wife of Franco and former lover of Leonardo
- Polo Ravales as Franco: violent husband of Merlinda
- Raymond Bagatsing as Father Carlos: head of the Parish where Leonardo does his mission
- Althea Vega as Aling Celia: a battered woman who takes shelter in the Parish

== Soundtrack ==
The film score was composed by Franco Eco, an Italian musician.

== Release ==
The film was originally released on June 27, 2015 as an entry at the 2015 World Premieres Film Festival. It has been released commercially from April 28 to May 4, 2017 under Cine Lokal, a joint project of SM Cinemas and Cine Lokal of FDCP, meant to give more exposure to independent Philippine films that won awards abroad.

=== Festivals ===
The film (which is technically an Italy-Philippine co-production) was the Italian entry to the 19th Cine Europa, the biggest European Film Festival outside Europe
