= Ang Iibigin ay Ikaw Pa Rin =

2003 Philippine television drama series

- Title card
- Also known as: My One and Only Love 2
- Genre: Romantic drama
- Written by: Gina Marissa Tagasa-Gil
- Directed by: Joyce E. Bernal; Lore Reyes
- Starring: Christopher de Leon; Richard Gomez; Alice Dixson; Lani Mercado
- Country of origin: Philippines
- Original language: Tagalog
- No. of episodes: 93

Production
- Executive producer: Marjorie La Chica
- Producer: Jimmy Duavit
- Camera setup: Multiple-camera setup
- Running time: 30 minutes
- Production company: GMA Entertainment TV

Original release
- Network: GMA Network
- Release: April 14 – August 22, 2003

Related
- Ang Iibigin ay Ikaw

Ang Iibigin ay Ikaw Pa Rin (transl. the beloved is still you / international title: My One and Only Love 2) is a 2003 Philippine television drama romance series broadcast by GMA Network. The series served as a sequel to the Philippine television series Ang Iibigin ay Ikaw. Directed by Joyce E. Bernal and Lore Reyes, it stars Christopher de Leon, Richard Gomez, Alice Dixson and Lani Mercado. It premiered on April 14, 2003 on the network's Telebabad line up. The series concluded on August 22, 2003, with a total of 93 episodes.

== Cast and characters ==
Cast

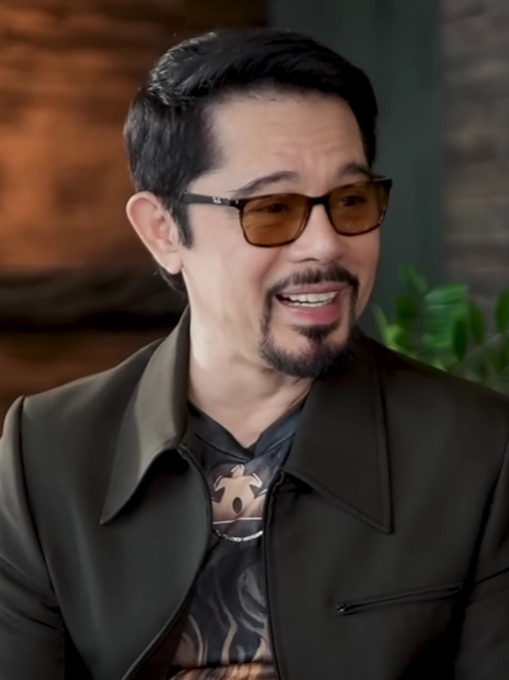
Christopher de Leon

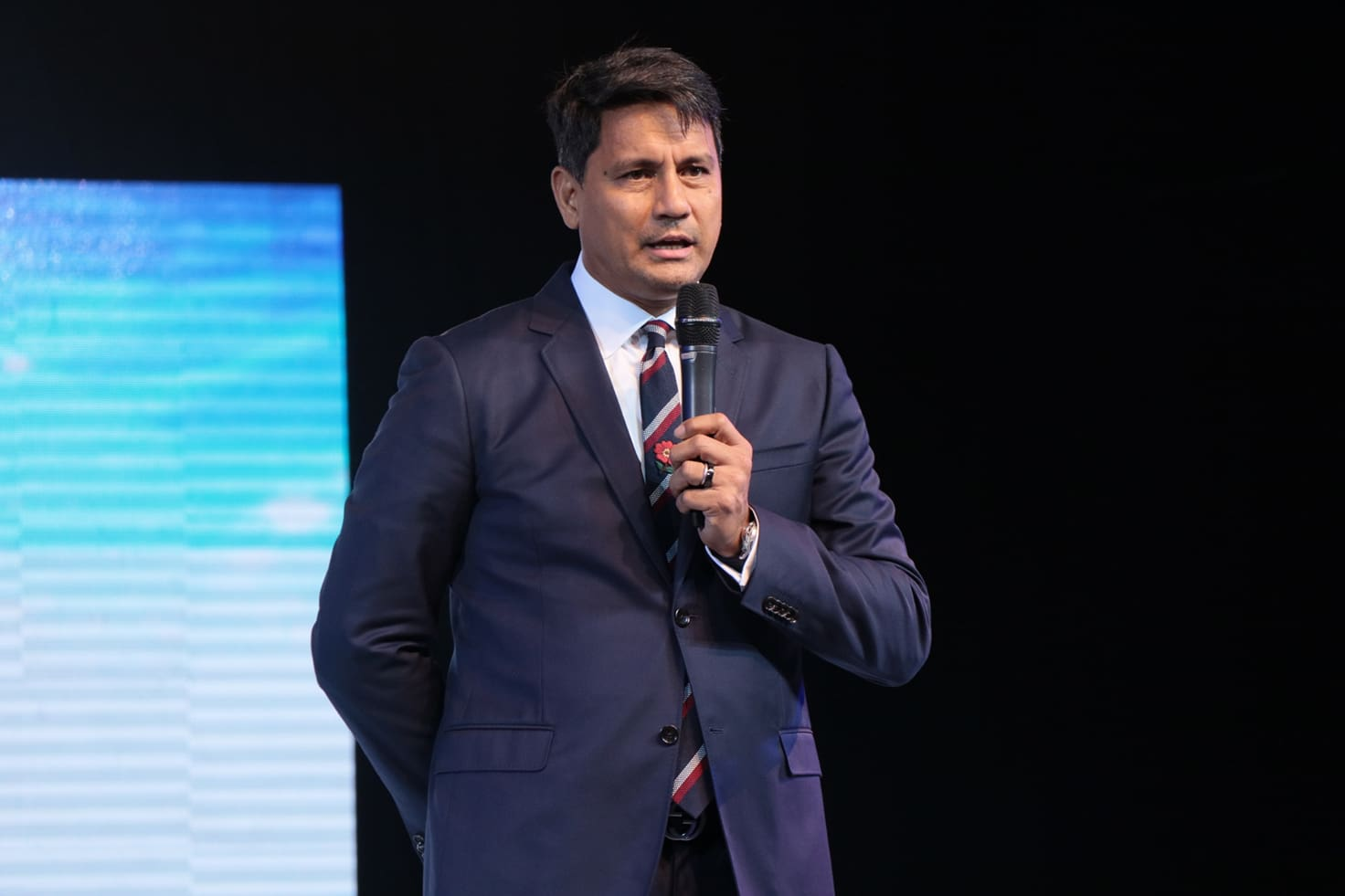
Richard Gomez

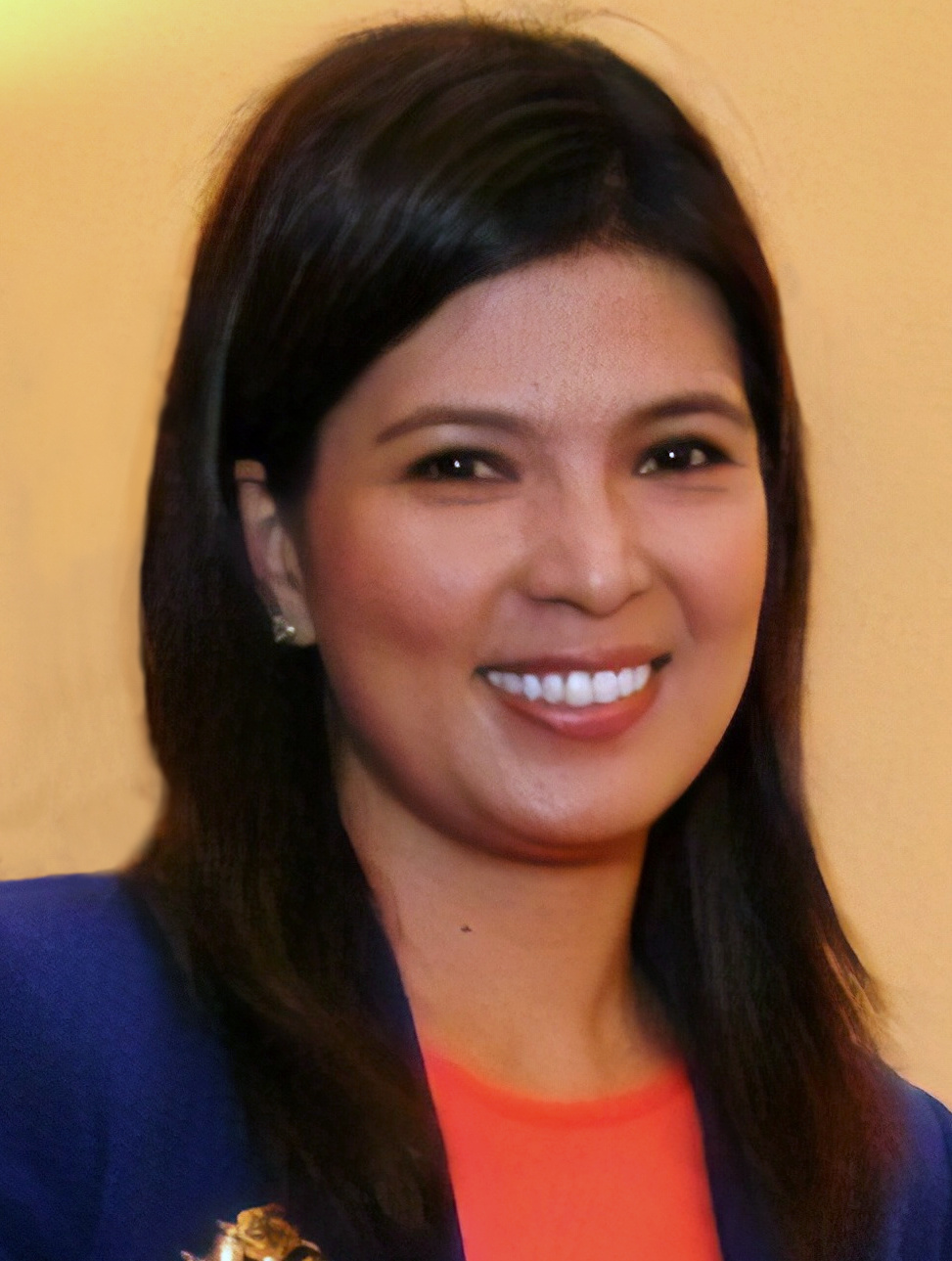
Lani Mercado

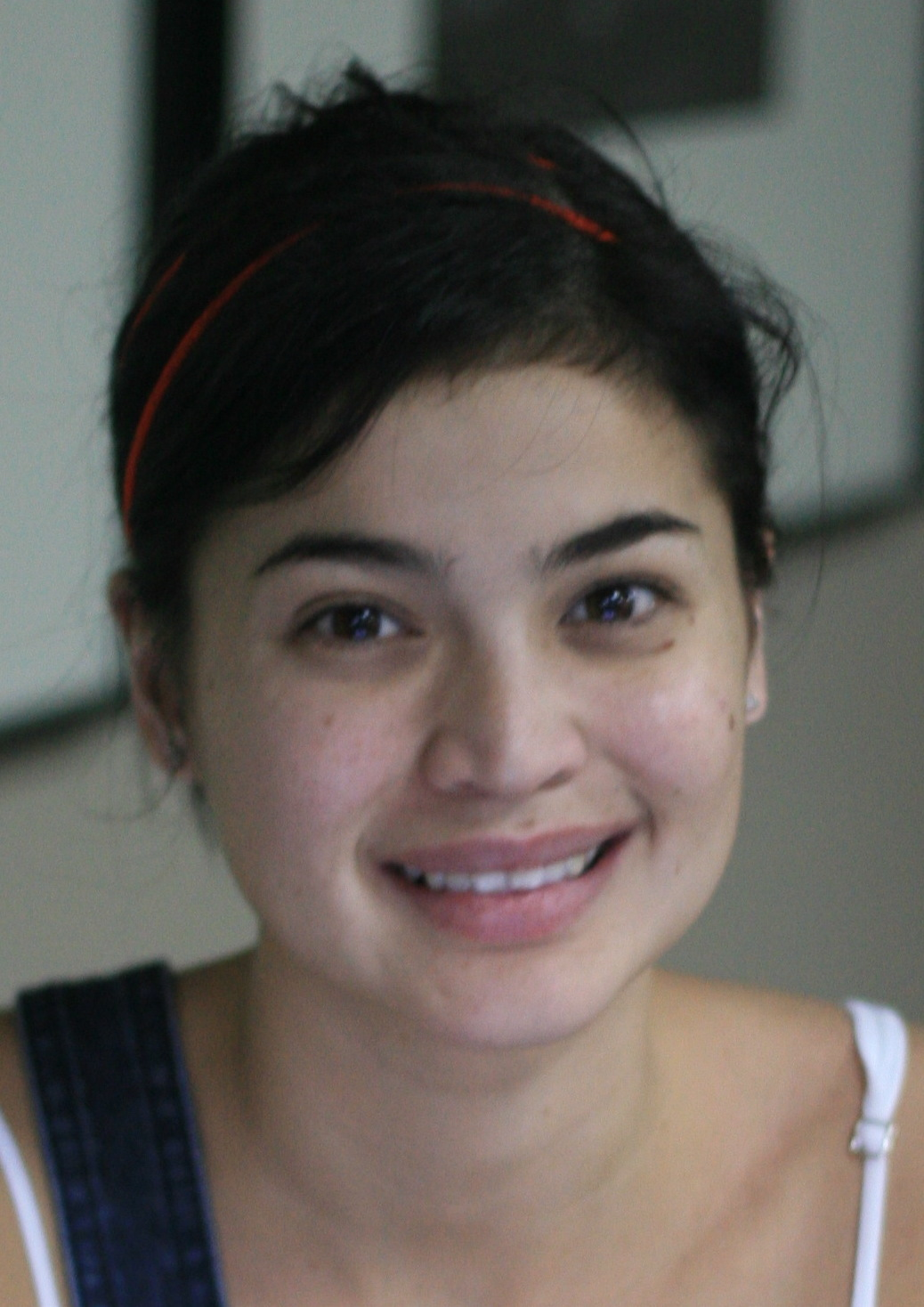
Anne Curtis

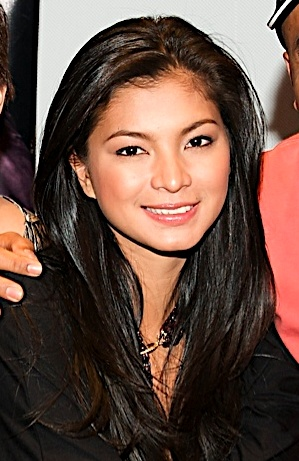
Angel Locsin

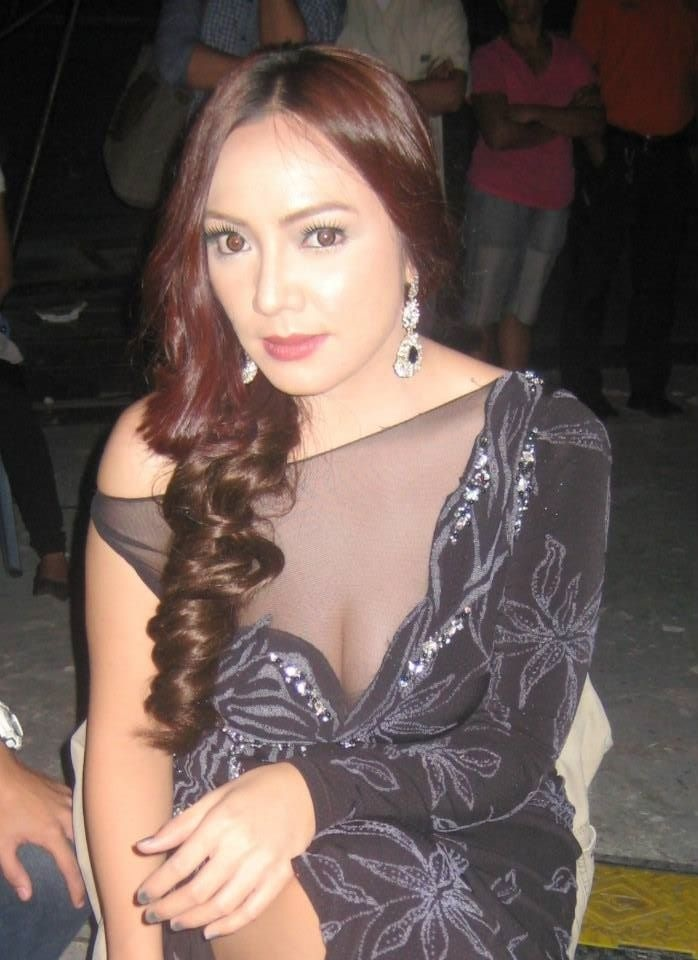
Shermaine Santiago

Lead cast

- Christopher de Leon as Lemuel Verder
- Alice Dixson as Mia Sandoval
- Richard Gomez as Waldo Sandoval
- Lani Mercado as Madonna Verder

Supporting cast

- Barbara Perez as Salud Verder
- Boots Anson-Roa as Felisa Verder
- Mark Gil as Enrico Villadolid
- Jackie Lou Blanco as Sabrina Villadolid
- Cris Daluz as Antonio
- Rufa Mae Quinto as Liberty aka "Libay"
- Anne Curtis as Rosanna
- Angel Locsin as Mariella Sandoval
- Karen delos Reyes as Elmina
- AJ Eigenmann
- Chubi del Rosario as Anthony
- Polo Ravales as Tristan
- Mely Tagasa as Miling
- Shermaine Santiago as Mayumi
- Tess Dumpit as Virginia
- Kathleen Valenzuela as Kathleen
- Raquel Montesa as younger Salud
- Charina Scott as Jing jing
- Joy Viado as Anacleta
- Ama Quiambao as Lourdes

Guest cast

- Imee Marcos as Donato Verder's lawyer
