= The Marianas Web =

2025 Marco Calvise film

- Theatrical release poster
- Directed by: Marco Calvise
- Written by: Marco Calvise; Andrea Cavaletto; Ruben Maria Soriquez
- Produced by: Soong Willy; Marco Calvise; Ruben Maria Soriquez
- Starring: Sahara Bernales; Alexa Ocampo; Ruben Maria Soriquez
- Cinematography: Paolo Bertola; Eugenio Cinti Luciani
- Edited by: Paolo Bertola; John Tan
- Music by: Gianfranco Marongiu; Enrico Sabena
- Production company: Singularities Film Production
- Distributed by: Crystalsky Multimedia
- Release date: October 15, 2025
- Countries: Philippines; Italy
- Language: English
- Budget: $2 million

The Marianas Web is a 2025 science fiction horror film directed by Marco Calvise and co-written by Calvise, Andrea Cavaletto and Ruben Maria Soriquez. It stars Sahara Bernales, Alexa Ocampo and Ruben Maria Soriquez.

== Cast ==
- Sahara Bernales
- Alexa Ocampo
- John Rey Malto
- Ruben Maria Soriquez
- Asia Galeotti

== Release ==
The film released in Philippines on October 15, 2025, under Crystalsky Entertainment and scheduled to release in Italy, India, and other territories.

== Reception ==
Alwin Ignacio of Daily Tribune gave the film a positive feedback and wrote; The Marianas Web is a slow burn kind of motion picture and what makes it an engaging viewing experience is the acting of Sobriquez and Ocampo.
