= Kung Mahawi Man ang Ulap =

2007 Philippine television drama series

- Title card
- Also known as: Through It All
- Genre: Romantic drama
- Created by: Gilda Olvidado
- Based on: Kung Mahawi Man ang Ulap (1984) by Laurice Guillen
- Written by: Anna Aleta-Nadela; Gina Marisa Tagasa-Gil; Des Garbes-Severino
- Directed by: Mac Alejandre
- Starring: Nadine Samonte; Dennis Trillo; Iwa Moto
- Theme music composer: Willy Cruz
- Opening theme: "Mahawi Man ang Ulap" by Jonalyn Viray
- Country of origin: Philippines
- Original language: Tagalog
- No. of episodes: 75

Production
- Executive producer: Camille Gomba-Montaño
- Camera setup: Multiple-camera setup
- Running time: 25–35 minutes
- Production company: GMA Entertainment TV

Original release
- Network: GMA Network
- Release: July 30 – November 9, 2007

Kung Mahawi Man ang Ulap (transl. If the cloud dissipates / international title: Through It All) is a 2007 Philippine television drama romance series broadcast by GMA Network. Based on a 1984 Philippine film of the same title, the series is the third instalment of Sine Novela. Directed by Mac Alejandre, it stars Nadine Samonte, Dennis Trillo and Iwa Moto. It premiered on July 30, 2007 on the network's Dramarama sa Hapon line up. The series concluded on November 9, 2007, with a total of 75 episodes.

== Cast and characters ==
Cast

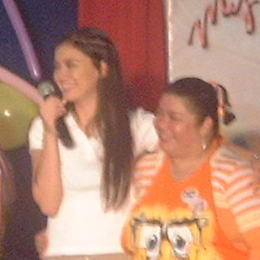
Nadine Samonte (left)

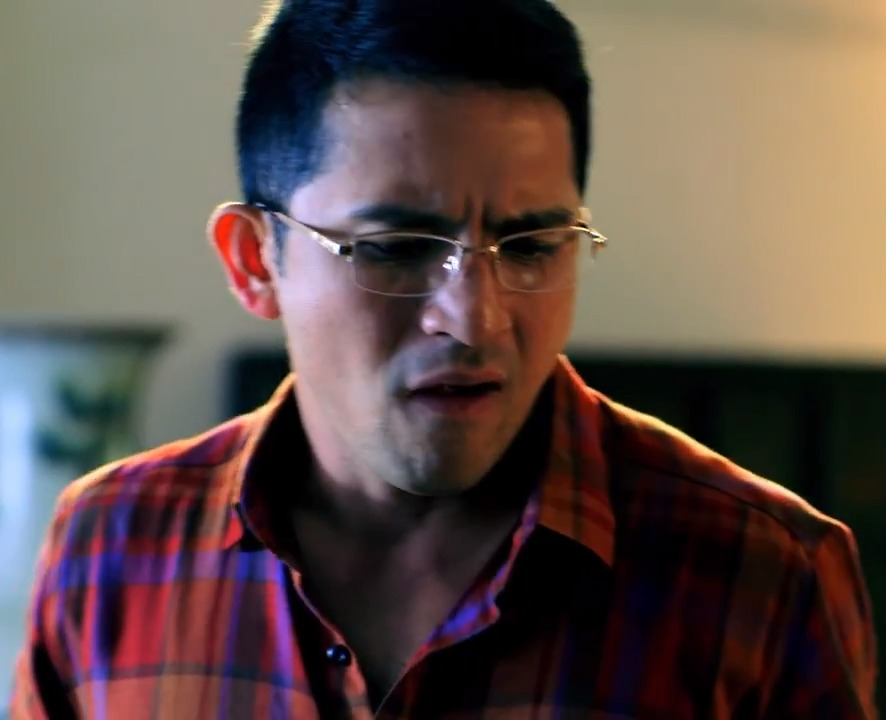
Dennis Trillo

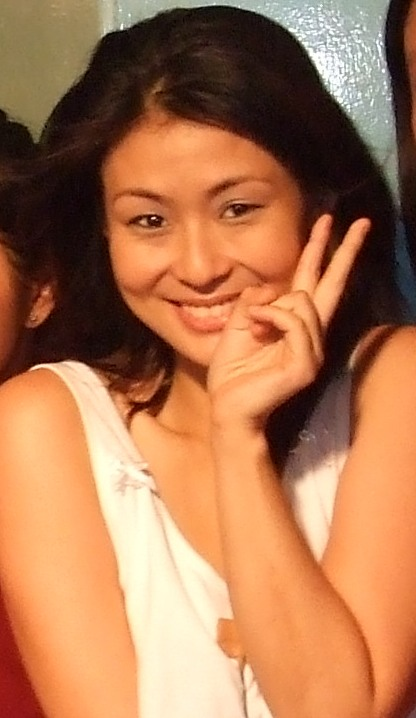
Iwa Moto

Lead cast

- Nadine Samonte as Catherine Clemente
- Dennis Trillo as Rustan "Stan" Ilustre
- Iwa Moto as Rita Acuesta

Supporting cast

- Gardo Versoza as Pablo Acuesta
- Hazel Ann Mendoza as Chona Acuesta
- Jeremy Marquez as Jojo Acuesta
- Glydel Mercado as Minda Clemente
- Aiza Marquez as Liza
- Vangie Labalan as Rosa
- Ces Quesada as Chayong
- Tyron Perez as Anastacio

Guest cast

- Tommy Abuel as Rogelio
- Kevin Santos as Tencho
- Wendell Ramos as Michael
- Ama Quiambao as Amelia R. Santos
- Chuck Allie as Vincent
- Sheena Halili as Monique

== Production ==
Principal photography commenced on July 7, 2007.

== Ratings ==
According to AGB Nielsen Philippines' Mega Manila household television ratings, the final episode scored a 27.8% rating.
