= Gagambino =

Philippine television drama series

- Title card
- Genre: Fantasy drama
- Based on: Gagambino by Carlo J. Caparas
- Developed by: Suzette Doctolero
- Directed by: Topel Lee; Don Michael Perez
- Starring: Dennis Trillo
- Theme music composer: Janno Gibbs; Tats Faustino
- Opening theme: "Gagambino!" by Dennis Trillo
- Country of origin: Philippines
- Original language: Tagalog
- No. of episodes: 90

Production
- Executive producer: Winnie Hollis-Reyes
- Production locations: Metro Manila, Philippines
- Camera setup: Multiple-camera setup
- Running time: 30–45 minutes
- Production company: GMA Entertainment TV

Original release
- Network: GMA Network
- Release: October 20, 2008 – February 20, 2009

Gagambino is a Philippine television drama fantasy series broadcast by GMA Network. The series is based from Carlo J. Caparas' graphic novel of the same title. Directed by Topel Lee and Don Michael Perez, it stars Dennis Trillo in the title role. It premiered on October 20, 2008, on the network's Telebabad line up. The series concluded on February 20, 2009, with a total of 90 episodes.

== Cast and characters ==
Cast

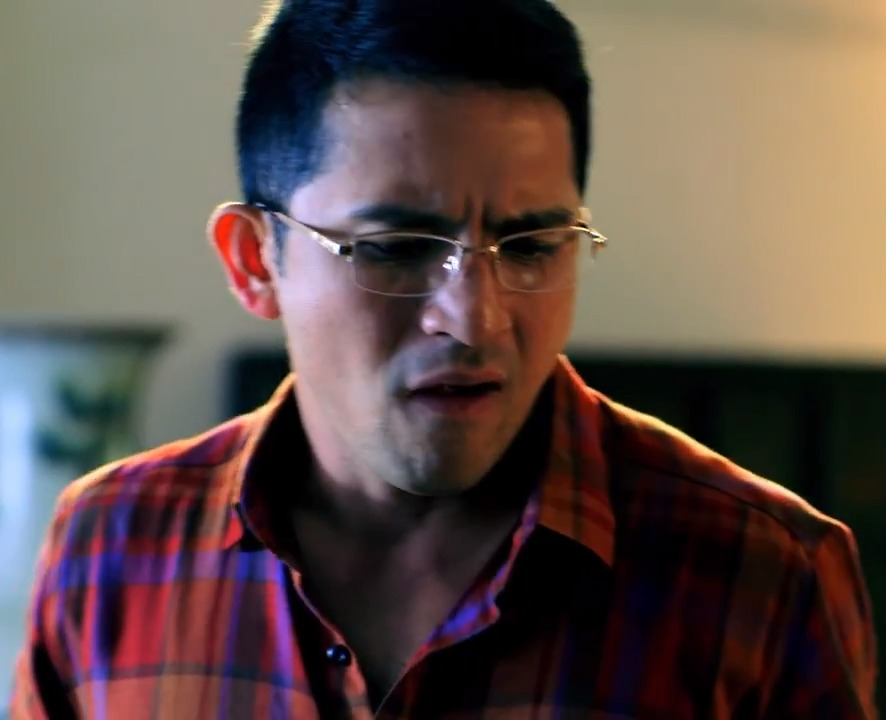
Dennis Trillo

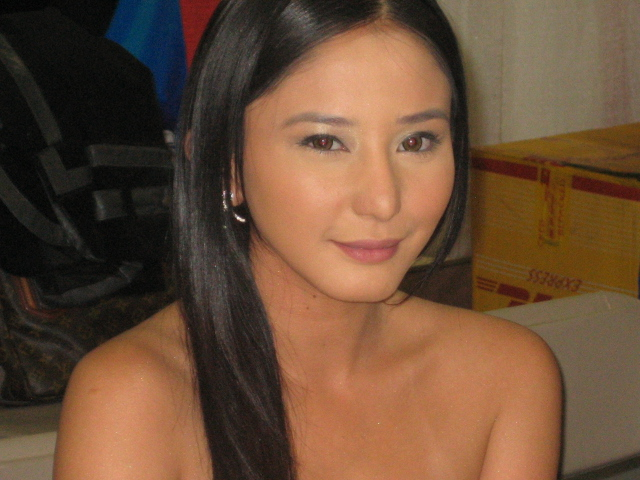
Katrina Halili

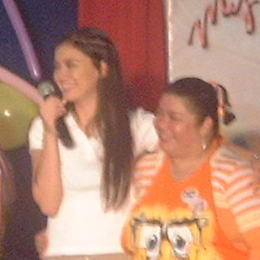
Nadine Samonte (left)

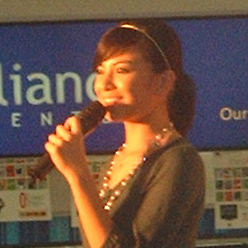
Glaiza de Castro

Lead cast

- Dennis Trillo as Gambino "Bino" Bayani

Supporting cast

- Raymart Santiago as Dindo Gutierrez
- Polo Ravales as Harold Santiago
- Katrina Halili as Lucy Gutierrez / Lady Mantisa
- Nadine Samonte as Celine Lopez
- Isabel Oli as Bernadette Albuento / Alakdanessa
- Glaiza de Castro as Leah Albuento / Super Bee
- Jennica Garcia as Gelay L. Bayani
- Jean Garcia as Abresia / Divina M. Lopez-Gutierrez
- Mart Escudero as Noel Albuento
- Glydel Mercado as Rebecca Bayani-Santiago
- Jan Manual as Eldon
- Benjie Paras as Stalin
- Krista Kleiner as Krissa

Guest cast

- Zoren Legaspi as Armand Santiago
- Bernadette Allyson as Elena Bayani
- John Arcilla as Alejandro Bayani

== Development ==
In February 2007, GMA Network bought the rights to Carlo J. Caparas' graphic novel, with actor Richard Gutierrez attached to star. The series was shelved until 2008 and Gutierrez opted to work on the television series Codename: Asero. GMA Network decided that they could not longer delay the series and gave the lead role to actor Dennis Trillo, over casting contender: JC de Vera. Director Topel Lee required Trillo to learn wing chun, judo and kendo in preparation for the role.

== Production ==
Principal photography commenced in September 2008.

== Ratings ==
According to AGB Nielsen Philippines' Mega Manila household television ratings, the pilot episode of Gagambino earned a 34.5% rating. The final episode scored a 34.7% rating.
