= Nadine Samonte =

Filipino actress

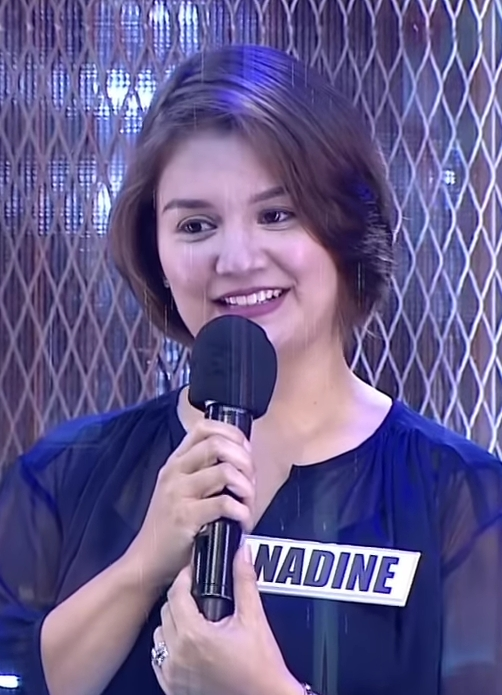
- Samonte guesting in Eat Bulaga!'s Bawal Judgemental on March 6, 2021
- Born: Nadine Burgos Eidloth; 2 March 1988 (age 38); Rosenheim, Bavaria, West Germany
- Occupation: Actress
- Years active: 2001–2018; 2022–present
- Agents: Star Magic (2001–2003) GMA Artist Center (2003–2011) TV5 (2011–2014); Viva Artists Agency (2016–2022) Sparkle (2023–present)
- Known for: Lorraine in Bakekang; Super T in Super Twins; Shirley in Endless Love; Roma / Babaeng Impakta in Darna
- Spouse: Richard Chua (m. 2013)
- Children: 3

Nadine Burgos Eidloth-Chua (born March 2, 1988), known professionally as Nadine Samonte, is a Filipino actress. She participated as an Avenger of the first season of StarStruck.

== Career ==
She received the "Most Promising Actress" award from the Guillermo Mendoza Memorial Scholarship Foundation.

She was included in the second installment of GMA's seasonal afternoon soap, Now and Forever with their plot entitled Ganti (Revenge). Then, she made another film teen-romance flick, Say That You Love Me. She was also included in the comedy film, Hari ng Sablay.

She then acted in the television series Etheria and the movie Isusumbong Kita sa Kuya Ko, which was an official entry to the Metro Manila Film Festival. She starred in Bakekang as Lorraine. Samonte which was followed by a role in Super Twins. Then, she was then chosen to reprise the role of Hilda Koronel in the TV remake of Kung Mahawi Man ang Ulap. She starred in the TV remake of Maging Akin Ka Lamang where she reprised the role of Dina Bonnevie.

In Ako si Kim Samsoon, a Koreanovela remake based on My Lovely Sam Soon, she plays Hannah. She followed with roles in Carlo J. Caparas' Gagambino, SRO Cinemaserye: Suspetsa and Darna (2009 version). Samonte also appears in the Sine Novela, Tinik Sa Dibdib where she played the new Lorna Yadao-Domingo or Danica.

In 2010, she became part of the cast of the Koreanovela remake Endless Love (based on Autumn in My Heart) as Shirley originally by South Korean actress Han Chae-young the main antagonist to lead stars Dingdong Dantes, Marian Rivera and Dennis Trillo. She also followed up in special participation roles in Bantatay and Koreana.

In 2011, she starred in the suspense-drama series My Lover, My Wife where she played the main antagonist but later the show did not renewed into second season. On 13th of July 2011, TV5 announced that she will be joining on their upcoming television pilot playing the lead role. In October 2014, she declared that she is open to any network since she's now a freelance artist.

After a long hiatus in showbiz, she officially came back to her home network GMA Network by signing as a Sparkle artist last September 22, 2023.

== Personal life ==
Nadine Samonte graduated from high school through the Alternative Learning System of the Department of Education.

Samonte has been married to businessman Richard Chua since October 30, 2013; they kept their marriage private until their first wedding anniversary. In June 2016, it was announced that the couple were expecting their first child. Their daughter was born in August 2016.

She has German ancestry from her father.

== Filmography ==
=== Film ===
Year	Title	Role
2004	Kiling... Pintig... Yanig...	Tina
2004	Forever My Love	Pammy
2004	Enteng Kabisote: OK Ka Fairy Ko... The Legend	Tanya
2005	Say That You Love Me	Sarah
2005	Happily Ever After	Abby
2005	Hari Ng Sablay	Mindy
2006	Isusumbong Kita sa Kuya Ko	Susan
2006	Pitong Dalagita	KC
2011	Yesterday, Today, Tomorrow	TV Soap Actress
2023	Layas	

=== Television ===
Year	Title	Role	Source
2003–2004	StarStruck	Herself	
2003–2004	Stage 1: Starstruck Playhouse	Herself	
2003–2004	Stage 1: Live!	Herself	
2004	SOP Gigsters	Herself	
2004	Love to Love	Natalia / Mutya	
2004	Ikaw sa Puso Ko	Sofia	
2004–2005	Leya, ang Pinakamagandang Babae sa Ilalim ng Lupa	Leya	
2005	Mars Ravelo's Darna	Ava / The Other Body of Valentina	
2005	Now and Forever: Ganti	Marianne	
2005–2006	Etheria: Ang Ikalimang Kaharian ng Encantadia	Hera Mine-a	
2005–2006	My Guardian Abby	Pink Angel Abby	
2006–2007	Carlo J. Caparas' Bakekang	Lorraine Arevalo	
2007	Super Twins	Super T	
2007	Magic Kamison	Ava Mutain	
2007	Sine Novela: Kung Mahawi Man ang Ulap	Catherine Clemente	
2007–2008	MariMar	Innocencia Arcega-Del Castillo	
2008	Sine Novela: Maging Akin Ka Lamang	Elsa Paruel-Abrigo	
2008	Ako si Kim Samsoon	Hannah Villanueva	
2008	Dear Friend	Jasmine	
2008–2009	Carlo J. Caparas' Gagambino	Celine Lopez	
2009	Suddenly It's Magic	Alani	
2009	SRO Cinemaserye	Abigail Luna	
2009–2010	Mars Ravelo's Darna	Roma / Babeng Impakta / Babaeng Lawin	
2009–2010	Sine Novela: Tinik sa Dibdib	New Lorna Yadao-Domingo / Danica Mangahas	
2009	SRO Cinemaserye	Sharon	
2010	Claudine	Yayang Aswang	
2010	Endless Love	Shirley Cruz/Dizon	
2010	Bantatay	Angel Rodriguez	
2011	My Lover, My Wife	April Romero-Salvador	
2011	Rod Santiago's The Sisters	Bella Santiago / Christina Santiago	
2011	Sa Ngalan ng Ina	Mayor Andrea Deogracias	
2012	Valiente	Maila Delos Reyes-Braganza / Maila Regalado Ilagan-Valiente	
2012	Game 'N Go	Herself	
2012	Enchanted Garden	Maring	
2013	Kidlat	Lara Martinez	
2014	Imbestigador	Ashela "Ash" Antipuesta	
2014	Hawak Kamay	Grace Dela Rama	
2014	Maalaala Mo Kaya	Rachel	
2014	Give on Love Christmas: The Gift Giver	Mariz Lopez-Aguinaldo	
2014	Ipaglaban Mo!	Naty	
2015	FPJ's Ang Probinsyano	Rose Dalisay	
2015–2016	Princess in the Palace	Judy Cruz	
2015	Imbestigador	Grace	
2022	Wish Ko Lang	Maria	
2023	Wish Ko Lang	Rowena	
2023	The Missing Husband	Winona "Nona" Villafuerte vda. de Lazaro	
2024	Tadhana	Apple	
2024–2025	Forever Young	Judy Ann "Juday" Agapito	

== Awards ==
- Guillermo Mendoza Memorial Scholarship Foundation Awardee (2004) – Most Promising Female Artist
