= Donald Petrie =

American film director

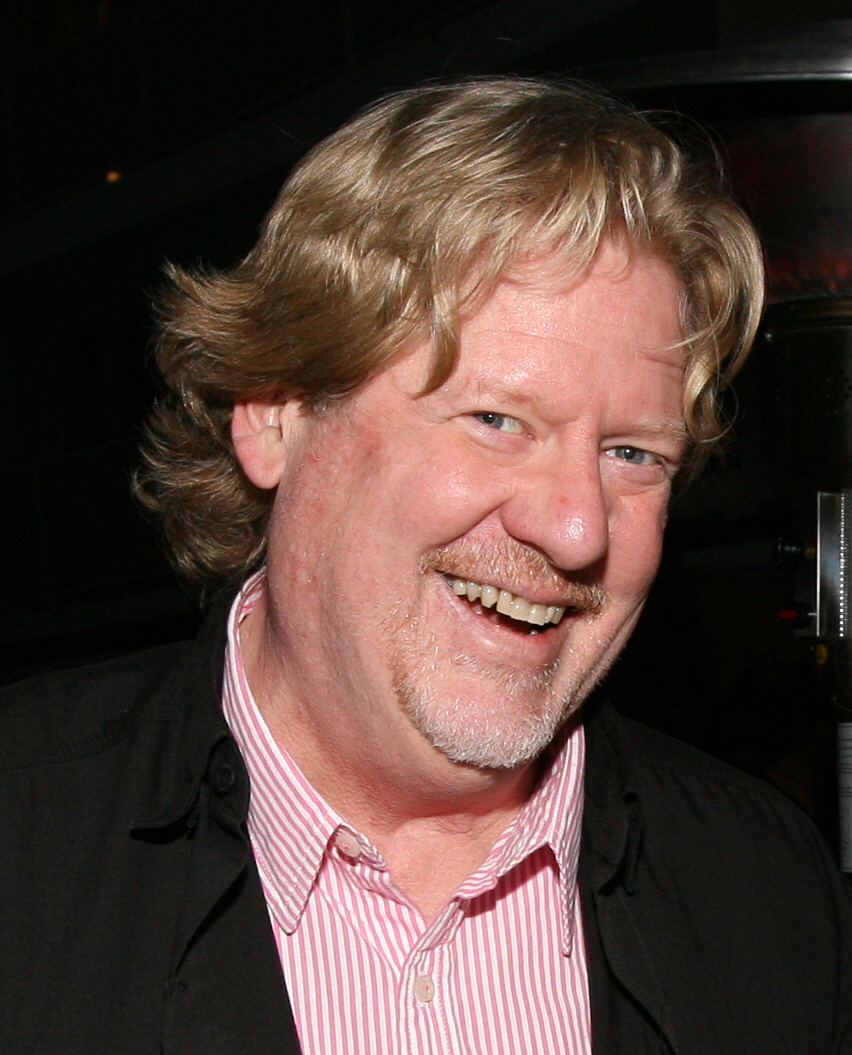
- Petrie in 2012
- Born: New York City, U.S.
- Occupations: Film director, actor
- Years active: 1976–present

Donald Petrie is an American film director and actor.

== Life and career ==
Petrie was born in New York City, the son of Dorothea (née Grundy), a television producer, actor, and novelist, and Daniel Petrie, a director. He is the brother of writer Daniel Petrie Jr.

Petrie began his entertainment career as an actor, having trained and graduated from California State Northridge as a theatre major. Petrie soon was appearing in many television episodes. In 1980, Petrie decided to shift his focus to directing when he was accepted as a Fellow at the American Film Institute.

Petrie has acted and guest-starred on television programs since 1976.

== Filmography ==
Film

- Mystic Pizza (1988)
- Opportunity Knocks (1990)
- Grumpy Old Men (1993)
- The Favor (1994)
- Richie Rich (1994)
- The Associate (1996)
- My Favorite Martian (1999)
- Miss Congeniality (2000)
- How to Lose a Guy in 10 Days (2003)
- Welcome to Mooseport (2004)
- Just My Luck (2006) (also producer)
- My Life in Ruins (2009)
- Atlantic Gold (2013)
- Little Italy (2018)
- The Last Resort (2027)

TV movies

- Why on Earth? (1988)
- Turner & Hooch (1990)
- Country Estates (1993)

TV series

Year	Title	Episode(s)
1985	MacGyver	"Trumbo's World"
1985	Amazing Stories	"Mr. Magic"
1985–1988	The Equalizer	"Desperately"
1985–1988	The Equalizer	"Dead Drop"
1985–1988	The Equalizer	"Shades of Darkness"
1985–1988	The Equalizer	"Tip on a Sure Thing"
1985–1988	The Equalizer	"Riding the Elephant"
1986	CBS Schoolbreak Special	"Have You Tried Talking to Patty?"
1986	Downtown	"Pilot"
1986–1987	L.A. Law	"The Venus Butterfly"
1986–1987	L.A. Law	"The Douglas Fur Ball"
1987	Private Eye	"Nicky the Rose"
1987	The Oldest Rookie	"At the End of the Long Arm Is the Glad Hand"
1987	The Oldest Rookie	"Blue Flu"
1987	The Oldest Rookie	"Expert Witness"
1992	The Heights	"Talk to an Angel"
1992	The Heights	"On the Nickel"
1992	Picket Fences	"Remembering Rosemary"
1995	Chicago Hope	"Rise from the Dead"
1997	Players	"Con Job"
1999	Snoops	"Blood Lines"
2000	Opposite Sex	"Pilot"
2015	Chicago Med	"Mistaken"
2015	Chicago Med	"Reunion"
2015	Chicago Med	"Hearts"
2015	Chicago Med	"On Shaky Ground"
2015	Chicago Med	"What You Don't Know"
2017	Chicago Justice	"Fake"
2017	Chicago Justice	"Double Helix"
2017	Chicago Justice	"Lily's Law"
2018	The Kominsky Method	"Chapter 3. A Prostate Enlarges"
2018	The Kominsky Method	"Chapter 7. A String Is Attached"
2019	Chicago P.D.	"Good Men"
