= Maging Akin Ka Lamang =

1987 melodrama film by Lino Brocka

- Directed by: Lino Brocka
- Written by: Jose "Butch" Dalisay Jr.; Rene O. Villanueva
- Produced by: Ramon R. Salvador
- Starring: Christopher de Leon; Dina Bonnevie; Lorna Tolentino; Jay Ilagan
- Cinematography: Rody Lacap
- Edited by: Ike Jarlego Jr.
- Music by: Willy Cruz
- Production company: Viva Films
- Distributed by: Viva Films
- Release date: 6 May 1987
- Running time: 125 minutes
- Country: Philippines
- Language: Filipino

Maging Akin Ka Lamang (English: If Only You Could Be Mine) is a 1987 Philippine melodrama film directed by Lino Brocka from a screenplay written by Jose "Butch" Dalisay Jr. and Rene O. Villanueva for additional writing. Based on a comics serial by Ric S. Aquino that was serialized via Weekly Movie Specials, the story follows Rosita Monteverde, an affluent woman who tries to win the heart of Andy Abrigo, the man she wanted to marry. However, when her plans failed, she decided to kidnap his and Elsa's newborn son. The film stars Christopher de Leon, Dina Bonnevie, Lorna Tolentino, and Jay Ilagan.

Produced and distributed by Viva Films, the film was theatrically released on 6 May 1987. In 2008, GMA Network remade the film into a television drama series of the same name, as a sixth installment of Sine Novela.

== Plot ==
In 1979, architect Andy Abrigo returned to the Philippines from his trip to the United States, although he did not inform anyone of his departure, including Elsa. The reason for his absence was that he contemplated his life while involved in an affair with Rosita Monteverde. At a party in Rosita's mansion, Andy renews his feelings with Elsa, who was disappointed for not being informed about his absence. On the following day, Andy received a job offer as head of the design services division at Green Mountain, Rosita's company.

Rosita Monteverde bribed Dr. Mendez with a million pesos and a position as hospital director to get the child after Elsa gave birth. On the day of birth, Elsa was given anesthesia. When she regained consciousness, Dr. Mendez informed the Abrigo couple that their child had died, much to Elsa's devastation. The following day, Andy went to Rosita's office, only to be informed by Ernie that Rosita had left for Los Angeles. Ernie was designated chief executive officer in her absence, and to Andy's disappointment, abolished the design services division.

After six years of living in the United States, Rosita, who brought a boy named Adrian, returned to the Philippines. Meanwhile, the Abrigos currently own a furniture business.

At a company meeting, much to Ernie's anger, Rosita informed everyone that once Andy became the director, he would be the president of Green Mountain. While Andy has no interest in being president of Green Mountain, he warned her that it would hurt her relationships with the people who managed it. Rosita told him that she still obsessively loves Andy, who begged her to stop her insanity. Moments later, Ernie returns with a gun and wants to kill Rosita. Much to everyone's horror, including Rosita, Andy was shot instead and later sent to the hospital.

Because of this, Rosita realized that her obsession with Andy led to dangerous consequences, and by the time Andy was recovering, she forgave Andy and Elsa for her actions. Before going back to the United States and never returning to the country, Rosita gave a folder to the Abrigos, which revealed that she transferred everything she owned, including her company, to Adrian.

== Cast ==
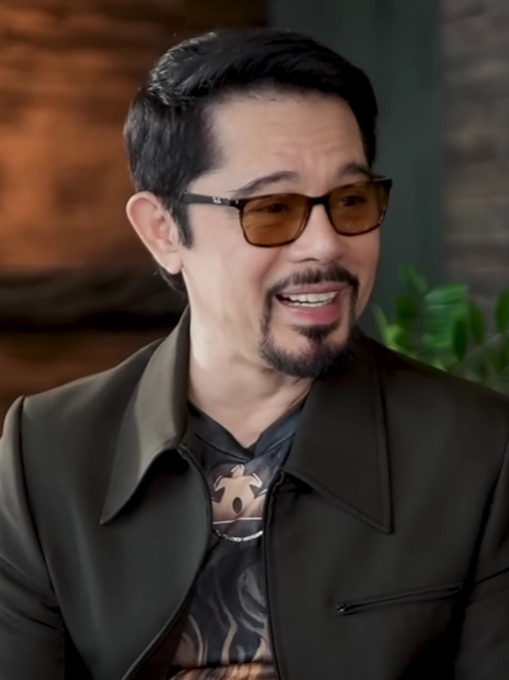
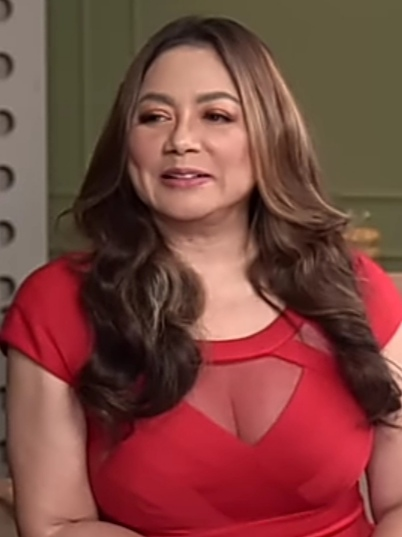
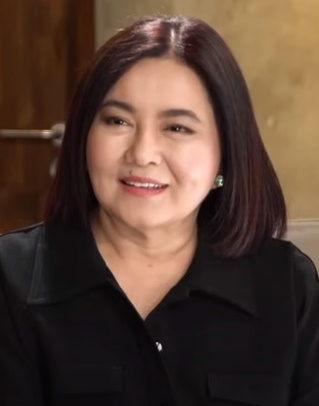
Three of the film's main cast: Christopher de Leon, Dina Bonnevie, and Lorna Tolentino.
- Christopher de Leon as Andy Abrigo: An architect. He worked as the head of the design services division at Rosita's company before he resigned.
- Dina Bonnevie as Elsa Paruel-Abrigo: Andy's girlfriend-later-wife who works at a travel agency as an agent.
- Lorna Tolentino as Rosita Monteverde: An affluent woman who has a love obsession with Andy.
- Jay Ilagan as Ernie Asurin: Rosita's lover who later became the CEO of the company.
- Toby Alejar as Rick Rivera: Andy's friend.
- Jaime Fabregas as Dr. Mendez: The physician who was bribed by Rosita.
- Subas Herrero as Atty. Rivas: The Monteverde family lawyer.
- Bong Suarez as Adrian Monteverde: Andy and Elsa's six-year-old son, who was kidnapped after his birth by Rosita after she bribed Dr. Mendez

== Production ==
In the documentary Signed: Lino Brocka by Christian Blackwood, which also featured the behind-the-scenes of the film, director Lino Brocka said Maging Akin Ka Lamang was his commitment to Viva Films, whose producer paid the bail bond for his (who was part of the negotiating panel) and others' release from detention due to their involvement in a transport strike in January 1985.

== Themes and analysis ==
According to the book Notes on Philippine Cinema by Emmanuel A. Reyes, Maging Akin Ka Lamang is a notable example of comic serial-adapted films with a central conflict driven by male characters, in which both opposing parties are members of the wealthy upper class. Elsa and Rosita, the respective characters of Dina Bonnevie and Lorna Tolentino, are characterized as affluent people who are bored and turn to romantic and sexual activities for thrills and excitement.

== Release ==
The film was first released on 6 May 1987 in 36 movie theaters in the whole Metro Manila region and its neighboring provinces of Rizal and Bulacan. It received a terrestrial television premiere on 28 April 1988, as ABS-CBN's feature presentation for Viva Blockbusters.

== Reception ==
=== Accolades ===
Accolades received by Maging Akin Ka Lamang
Year	Award	Category	Recipient(s)	Result	Ref.
1988	FAMAS Awards	Best Actor	Christopher de Leon	Nominated	
1988	FAMAS Awards	Best Supporting Actor	Jay Ilagan	Won	
1988	FAMAS Awards	Best Supporting Actress	Dina Bonnevie	Nominated	
1988	FAMAS Awards	Best Story	Ric S. Rodrigo	Nominated	
1988	FAMAS Awards	Best Screenplay	Jose F. Dalisay	Nominated	
1988	FAMAS Awards	Best Song	Willy Cruz	Nominated	
1988	FAP Awards	Best Picture	Maging Akin Ka Lamang	Nominated	
1988	FAP Awards	Best Director	Lino Brocka	Nominated	
1988	FAP Awards	Best Actor	Christopher de Leon	Nominated	
1988	FAP Awards	Best Actress	Lorna Tolentino	Won	
1988	FAP Awards	Best Supporting Actor	Jay Ilagan	Won	
1988	FAP Awards	Best Adaptation	Butch Dalisay	Nominated	
1988	FAP Awards	Best Production Design	Edgar Martin Littaua	Nominated	
1988	FAP Awards	Best Editor	Ike Jarlego Jr.	Nominated	
1988	FAP Awards	Best Musical Score	Willy Cruz	Nominated	
1988	Star Awards	Best Picture	Maging Akin Ka Lamang	Nominated	
1988	Star Awards	Best Director	Lino Brocka	Nominated	
1988	Star Awards	Best Actress	Lorna Tolentino	Won	
1988	Star Awards	Best Supporting Actor	Jay Ilagan	Nominated	
1988	Star Awards	Best Supporting Actress	Dina Bonnevie	Nominated	
1988	Star Awards	Best Adapted Screenplay	Maging Akin Ka Lamang, adapted by Jose Y. Dalisay	Nominated	
1988	Star Awards	Best Editor	Ike Jarlego Jr.	Nominated	
