= List of Darna (2022 TV series) characters =

2022 Philippine superhero series characters

Mars Ravelo's Darna (or simply Darna) is a 2022 Philippine superhero series based on Mars Ravelo's fictional character creation of the same name, under the production of JRB Creative Production and ABS-CBN Entertainment. It stars Jane de Leon in the titular role, her archenemy Janella Salvador, together with the ensemble casts Joshua Garcia, Zaijan Jaranilla, Rio Locsin and Paolo Gumabao. The series revolves around two story arcs (Season 1 and Season 2), a total of 130 episodes throughout its run.

== Protagonist ==
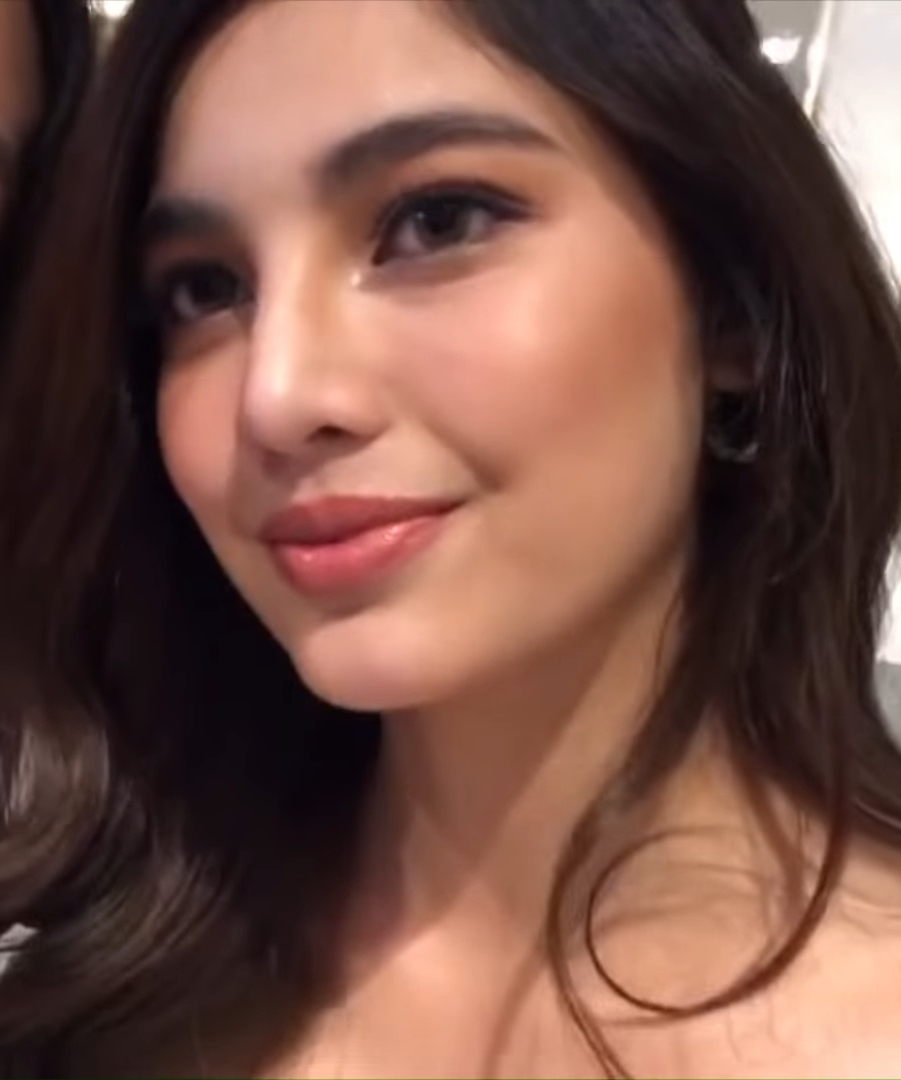
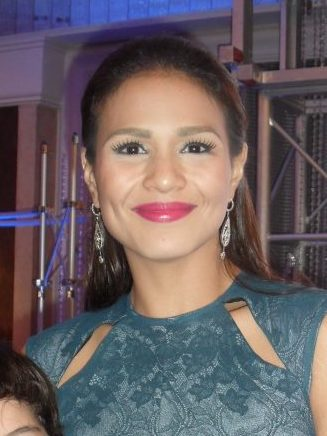
Jane de Leon (left) as Darna/Narda and Iza Calzado (right) as the Prime Darna/Zora/Leonor Custodio

=== Titular role ===
| Cast | Character | Character description | Powers and abilities |
|---|---|---|---|
| Jane de Leon | Darna/Narda Custodio | The protector of the mythical stone. A young emergency medical technician who took Leonor/Zora's place as the keeper of the mythical stone. She was trained at a young age by her mother to prepare her to be her successor. She is also an expert in Kali Martial Arts. | Main powers: Superhuman; Strength, Stamina, Endurance, Speed, Agility, Reflexes, Hearing; Enhanced Combat Mastery; Flight; Invincibility; Accelerated Rotation; Concussive Force; In Hiraya form (full potential): Cosmic Energy Channeling, Absolute Invulnerability, Aerokinesis; Weaponry: Gold-red cuffs, Earpiece |

=== Special participation ===
| Cast | Character | Summary | Powers and abilities |
|---|---|---|---|
| Iza Calzado | The Prime Darna/Leonor Custodio/Zora | The Prime Darna. She is the championed warrior from Planet Marte and the mother of Narda and Ding. | Superhuman; Strength, endurance, flexibility, stamina; Olympic-level combat skills; Flight; Invincibility |

== Archenemy ==
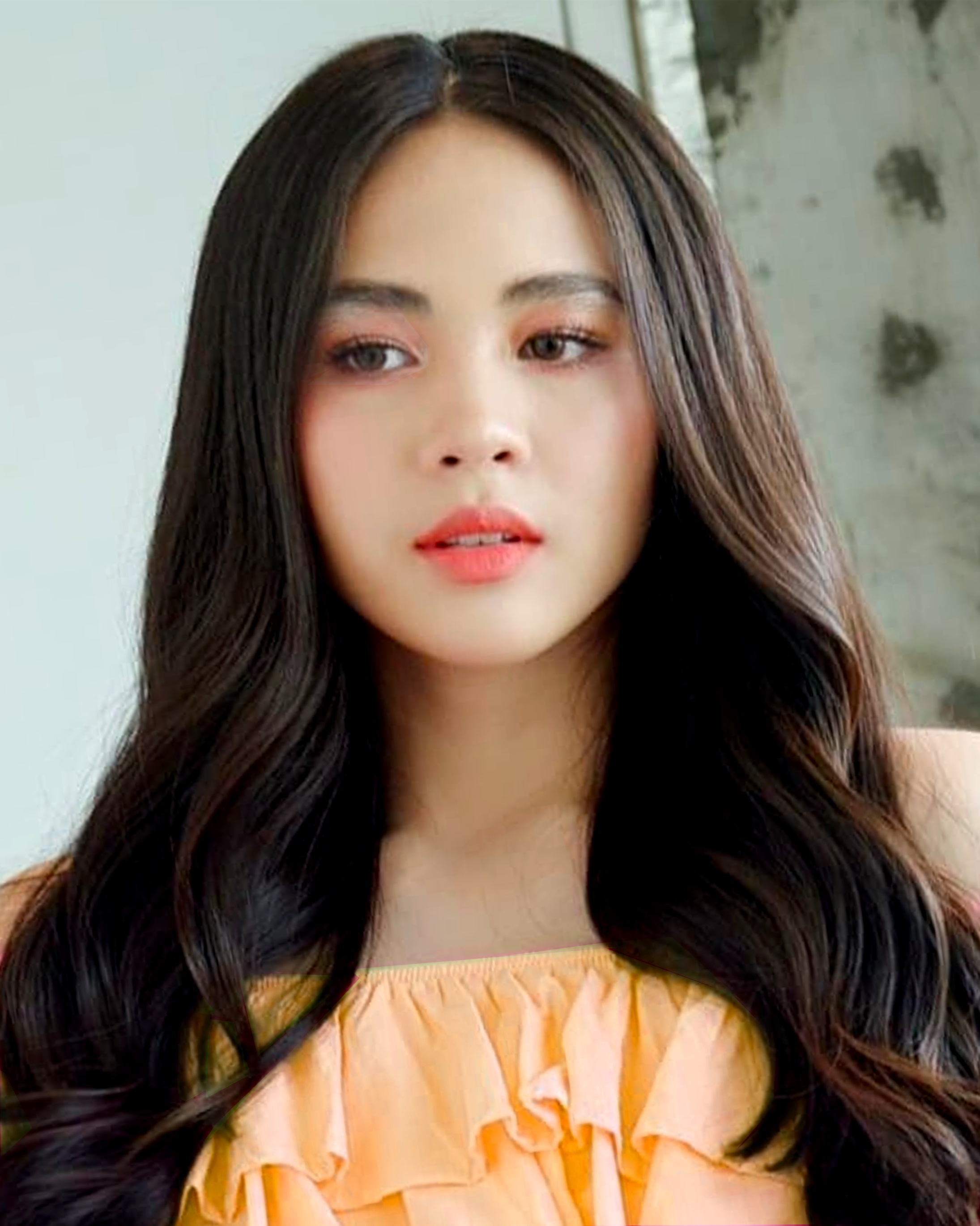
Janella Salvador as the Serpent Queen, Valentina

| Cast | Character | Character description | Powers and abilities |
|---|---|---|---|
| Janella Salvador | Valentina/Atty. Regina Vanguardia | As Regina Vanguardia, she is a social media influencer and lawyer. As her alter-ego The Serpent Queen, Valentina, she is cursed with having live, poisonous snakes for hair. She is Darna's archenemy and has romantic feelings for Brian. | Main powers: Snake Tendrils, Enhanced Flexibility, Weapon Immunity, Life-force Absorption, Snake Manipulation, Gorgon Physiology; Special abilities: Regenerative Healing Factor, Enhanced Night Vision, Enhanced Stealth, Visual Linking (using snakes); Post-death (strongest) form: Superhuman Strength and Durability, Retrocognition, Enhanced Stamina and durability, Advanced Physical Strength, Deadly Venom Secretion |

== Central-villain antagonist ==
| Cast | Character | Character description | Powers and abilities |
|---|---|---|---|
| Richard Quan | General Borgo / Atty. Rex Vanguardia | an alien from the planet Ludo who has plans of terminating human life and take control of the entire galaxy. He is Regina's severe and authoritarian father in the human form of Rex Vanguardia. | Main powers: Superhuman Strength, Endurance, Agility, Reflexes; Enhanced inventing, Master Combatant, Flight, Enhanced Durability, Enhanced Awareness, Shapeshifting Abilities, Tactical Genius; Powered armor suit granting: Laser beam emission, invisibility; Finale form (Serum injected): Pyrokinesis, laser vision, Shield manipulation |

== Supporting casts ==
| Cast | Character | Character description |
|---|---|---|
| Rio Locsin | Roberta Ferrer-Custodio | The grandmother of Narda and Ding. She is seen as an inspiration for both of her grandchildren and gives advice to them. |
| Jerfrey Santos | PEMS Ernie Antiporda | a police officer from Sierra Grande. He reassigns himself back to Nueva Esperanza to take care and guide Brian, following the death of his father. |
| Joj Agpangan | Mara Carbonell | A resident of Nueva Esperanza, online seller and Narda's funny bestfriend. |
| Viveika Ravanes | Maritess Carbonell | a resident of Nueva Esperanza and a neighbor of the Custodios and Mara's sister. She owns a small business in the city. |
| Zeppi Borromeo | Oleg Mendoza | a barangay watchman in Nueva Esperanza and a neighbor of the Custodios. |
| Marvin Yap | Gardo Laracruz | a resident tricycle driver of Nueva Esperanza. He used to be a thief with Vince as a kid, until Leonor, inspired him to change his lifestyle. |
| Gerard Acao | Pancho Paras | a tricycle driver in Nueva Esperanza. |
| Yogo | Jiro Romero | A resident of Nueva Esperanza and Ding's bestfriend. He goes to the same school as Ding. |
| Kiara Takahashi | Jerma T. Chan | Work as EMT at Vanguardia Rescue, headed by Attt. Regina Vanguardia. |
| Nicole Chan | Danielle Hocson | Work as EMT at Vanguardia Rescue, headed by Attt. Regina Vanguardia. |
| Argel Saycon | | Work as EMT at Vanguardia Rescue, headed by Attt. Regina Vanguardia. |
| Abi Kaseem | Laurie Quintos | Work as EMT at Vanguardia Rescue, headed by Attt. Regina Vanguardia. |

=== Cameo appearances ===
| Cast | Character | Character description |
|---|---|---|
| Joem Bascon | Danilo Custodio | the father of Narda and Ding and the husband of Leonor. He died before to the series' events. To explain to his children the history of Darna (Zora), he produced a comic book and left it to them. |
| Jeric Raval | PEMS Jaime Mercado Robles | Brian's father, a respectable police officer from Nueva Esperanza. He saw the battle between the Cyborg and the Prime Darna. |
| Celeste Cortesi | Queen Kevnar | She is the reigning Queen of Marte. |

=== Other supporting casts ===
- Hannah Ledesma as Annie: Tricia and Ding's professor.
- Alireza Libre as Roger Veluz: The man who brought a bomb inside the mall.
- Giovanni Baldiserri as Dr. Armando Feliciano
- Jenny Jamora as Sally Toledo: Javier Toledo's wife.
- Lloyd Zaragoza as Arnold Bautista: a notorious carnapper of Nueva Esperanza. He was killed by Valentina.
- Dwin Araza as Juanito: a TV talk show host of Juan On Juan along with Juancho.
- Mike Liwag as Juancho: a TV talk show host of Juan On Juan along with Juanito.
- Anne Feo as Dra. Ava Bartolome: The doctor who supported the suspension of Alex's father after his patient death went viral in social media.
- Lui Manansala as Trining Lagdameo: Miguel's grandmother
- Carla Martinez as Victoria Villacerran: Another form of General Borgo's disguise in human form. She is a wealthy businesswoman who invests heavily in Nueva Esperanza.
- Mike Lloren as Vice Mayor Felizardo "Feli" Gizmundo: The vice mayor of Nueva Esperanza.
- Bing Davao as General Diaz: Tricia's grandfather and a general who serves as acting mayor of Nueva Esperanza after the death of Mayor Felizardo.
- Malou Crisologo as Lourdes Antiporda: The older sister of PEMS Antiporda.
- Nico Antonio as Vorian: Ishna's older brother and former soldier of General Borgo. He was a protégé of Hergis and was eventually killed by Borgo, which prompted Ishna to turn her back on the latter.
- Pepe Herrera
- Ketchup Eusebio
- Hasna Cabral as a TV reporter
- Luciana Andres
- Jonic Magno
- Quincy Villanueva
- Rhett Romero as Colonel Malabanan
- Alireza Libre as Roger
- Lovely Rivero
- Jun Nayra

== Protagonists' allies ==
| Cast | Character | Character description | Powers and abilities |
|---|---|---|---|
| Zaijan Jaranilla | Ding Custodio | Narda's younger brother and sidekick, Ding is skillful with technology and computer games. | Enhanced Super Vision |
| Joko Diaz | Hergis / Klaudio | one of General Borgo's former allies from Ludo. He is the one who killed Leonor. In the end, all his memories are erased. | Master Combatant; Shapeshifting abilities; Enhanced Vision |
| Joshua Garcia | Brian Robles | a young police officer and EMT. He was once taken advantage of by his own clone "Dark Brian". As his evil doppelganger, He is a reckless, dishonest, and jovial police officer. He is the love interest for Narda. He was killed by one of Valnetina's snakes. | Hand-to-hand combat mastery; Weaponry: Gun |
| Kira Balinger | Luna | a trained warrior from the planet Marte. She was once inligned as the succeesor of the mythical stone. She arrived on Earth to seek informations about the Prime Darna and later became one of Darna's trusted allies. | Main powers: Enhanced strength, speed l, agility, durability and reflexes; Flight; Combat Specialism; Powered armor suit granting: Laser beam emission; Invisibility; Boomerang; Omnilingualism |
| Levi Ignacio | Dr. Rolando Villalobos | a scientist who dedicayed his life studying about alien's presence on Earth. He poses as a street food vendor and later replaced Dr. Ibarra as the head of the facility for extras. | Skilled Scientist |
| Mutya Orquia | Patricia "Tricia" Romero | The granddaughter of Gen. Diaz.She is one of Ding's classmate who has interest about extras. | Teleportation |
| L.A Santos | Richard | A resident of Nueva Esperanza and works as an EMT at Vanguardia Rescue. He was one of the few people who discovered Narda's identity as Darna. | N/A |

== The Extras ==
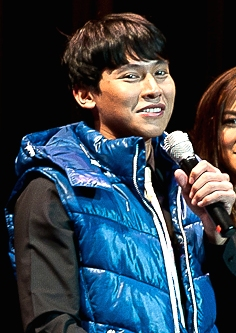
Enchong Dee as the Levitator

The Extras are "notorious for wreaking havoc and spreading terror across Nueva Esperanza". Their powers were drawn from the Martean Cyborg filled with green chrysalis (crystals) that exploded.

| Cast | Character | Character description |
|---|---|---|
| Jerald Napoles | Fredo Mitron/Strength Man | A former miner who possesses superhuman strength and can sustain any physical attacks and uses it to destroy anything at will. |
| Dominic Ochoa | Engr. Javier Toledo/Lindol Man | He seeks to expose the fraud that led to the construction of a facility utilizing subpar materials. However, the mayor's goons stopped him by burying him alive and poured solid cement on him while he was unconscious. He has the capacity to summon and control earthquakes at will. He also possesses geokinesis and telekinesis, which he previously employed to raise heavy stones in an effort to attack the goons. |
| Christian Bables | Dr. Alex dela Torre/Killer Ghost | A doctor by profession, he uses toxic poisons to kill his victims, and he has the ability to become invisible and pass through walls whenever he pleases. His frustration stems from the cyberbullying his father endured after one of his patients died while in his care. Brian put him to death. |
| Enchong Dee | Elijah "Eli" Torres/Levitator | A journalist who experiences ongoing harassment because he is the killer's son. As a result, he made an effort to kill himself, but Luisa prevented him. Telekinesis is his primary source of power. |
| Neil Coleta | Vincent Eugenio/Clone Man | an El Diablo member. But it was Annie who served as his incentive to change, and as a result he made the decision to permanently leave the company. However, Ishna tricked him by claiming that he was the target of a hit when he left the group. His abilities were limited teleportation and kinetic reproduction, which he employed to create many copies of himself for either fighting or eluding capture. He was Gardo's best pal from boyhood. It was Valentina who killed him. |
| Lito Pimentel | Dr. Florentino Ibarra | He was the scientist in-charge of the facility for the extras. Because of his evil ambitions, he was killed after fighting against Darna |
| Boom Labrusca | Pablo Guzman/Silent Shocker | An extra with the ability to control and disrupt anything powered by electricity. He also has electrokinesis as one of his many powers. Additionally, he has the electrical ability to create an energy barrier to protect himself from projectiles like gunshots. His support for Valentina's method of delivering justice by killing criminals stems from the attack that claimed the lives of his wife and child. |
| Loren Burgos | Prof. Luisa Espritu/Human Urchin | She is a teacher who was robbed and sexually assaulted by two guys, who subsequently stabbed her to death. After her death, she was revived as an extra with the ability to call forth spikes of various sizes that are black and resemble human bones. |
| Karl Gabriel | Inno Camarin/Dragon Mouth | A member of the X-Triad group. |
| Jef Gaitan | Klara Balisi/Seductress | A member of the X-Triad with the ability to hypnotize, especially on men to render them psychologically unable and subject them to her will. |
| Henz Villaraiz | Miguel Lagdameo/Boy Chop-Chop | a member of the X-Triad with the ability to separate his hands from his body. To steal siopao from a shop, he once employed this skill. Furthermore, he is the kidnapped grandson of Lola Trining. |

== The Super Soldiers ==
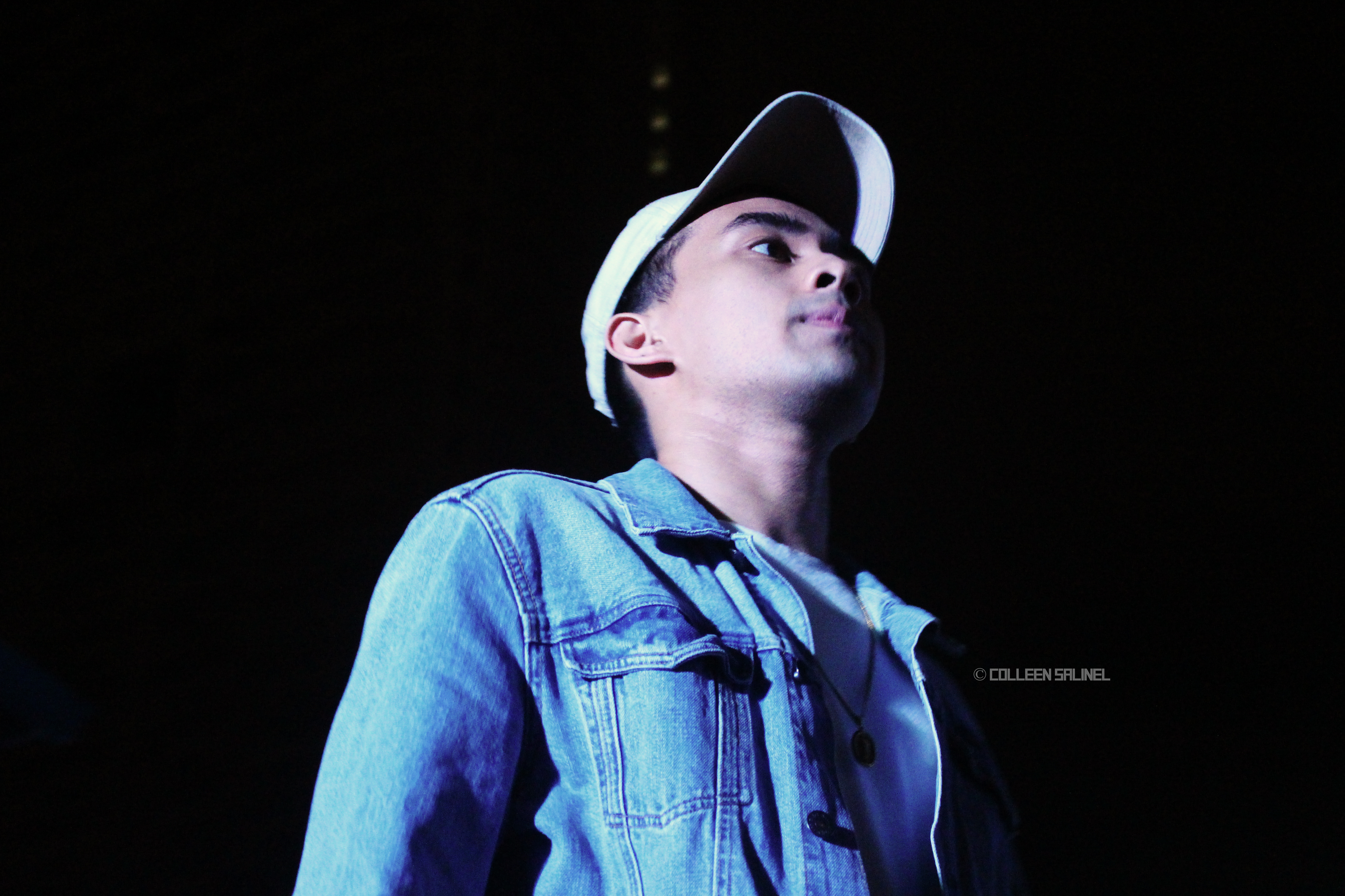
Gumabao (left) and Young JV (right) as members of Borgo's Super Soldiers

Under the command of General Borgo, The Super Soldiers is "a gang of villains who banded together" in Nueva Esperanza and vows to help him with his plans of conquering the galaxy and defeating Darna. Each of them were given separate superpowers.

| Cast | Character | Character description | Powers and abilities |
|---|---|---|---|
| Kim Rodriguez | Xandra / Ishna | The right hand of General Borgo. She roams around Nueva Esperanza to manipulate the people and accomplish missions ordered by Borgo. | Hand-to-hand combat mastery; Enhanced flexibility; Shapeshifting |
| Paolo Gumabao | Noah Vallesteros | the bully that tormented Brian when they were teenagers and Mayor Zaldy Vallesteros's only son. He became an extra after his father gave him an injection of a serum he obtained from a facility for extras. As an extra, he has Pyrokinesis as a source of power, enabling him to summon and direct fire whenever he pleases. Andre killed him unintentionally. | Pyrokinesis |
| Eric Fructuoso | PEMS Arthur Pineda | a Roblese-hating unscrupulous police officer in Nueva Esperanza. He was the one who killed Brian's dad. Later, Borgo makes him an extra, giving him the power to manage rubbish and waste. | Pollution manipulation; Garbage manipulation; Garbage emission |
| Dawn Chang | Maisha Rodriguez | She started off as Mayor Zaldy's secretary before eventually becoming Madam Victoria's and General Borgo's eyes and ears within city hall. She enlists as one of Borgo's super army extras, giving her the ability to hypnotize others and have them mimic every action she does. | Mind control/hypnotism; Mental manipulation; Replication |
| Simon Ibarra | Mayor Zaldy Vallesteros / Mr. X | the former Nueva Esperanza councilor who engineered the deaths of the current mayor and vice mayor in order to become mayor. He hates his son Noah and holds him responsible for the passing of his wife, Noah's mother. He transformed into an extra with the capacity to grow enormously. | Enhanced strength; Giant physiology |
| Mark Manicad | Ali Corpuz | Bodyguard for Regina who harbors illicit feelings towards her. He is the only individual who is aware that Regina and Valentina are the same person, other from General Borgo/Rex Vanguardia. Later, in order to get revenge on Darna, whom he believes killed Valentina, he works as an extra. | Laser heat vision |
| Young JV | Andre | An EMT at Vanguardia Rescue who works with Narda and Brian. He was abducted and used as an extra by Dr. Ibarra's men. He has the additional ability to make something more explosive by boosting its energy. | Bomb generation/manifestation |
| Joshua Colet | Sigfried Cruz | the renowned local television newscaster in Nueva Esperanza. Later, when he was an extra, he gained the ability to create a force field around himself and other people. | Energy shield construction |

== See also ==
- Darna
- Cultural impact of Darna
