= List of awards and nominations received by Jane de Leon =

Jane de Leon awards and nominations
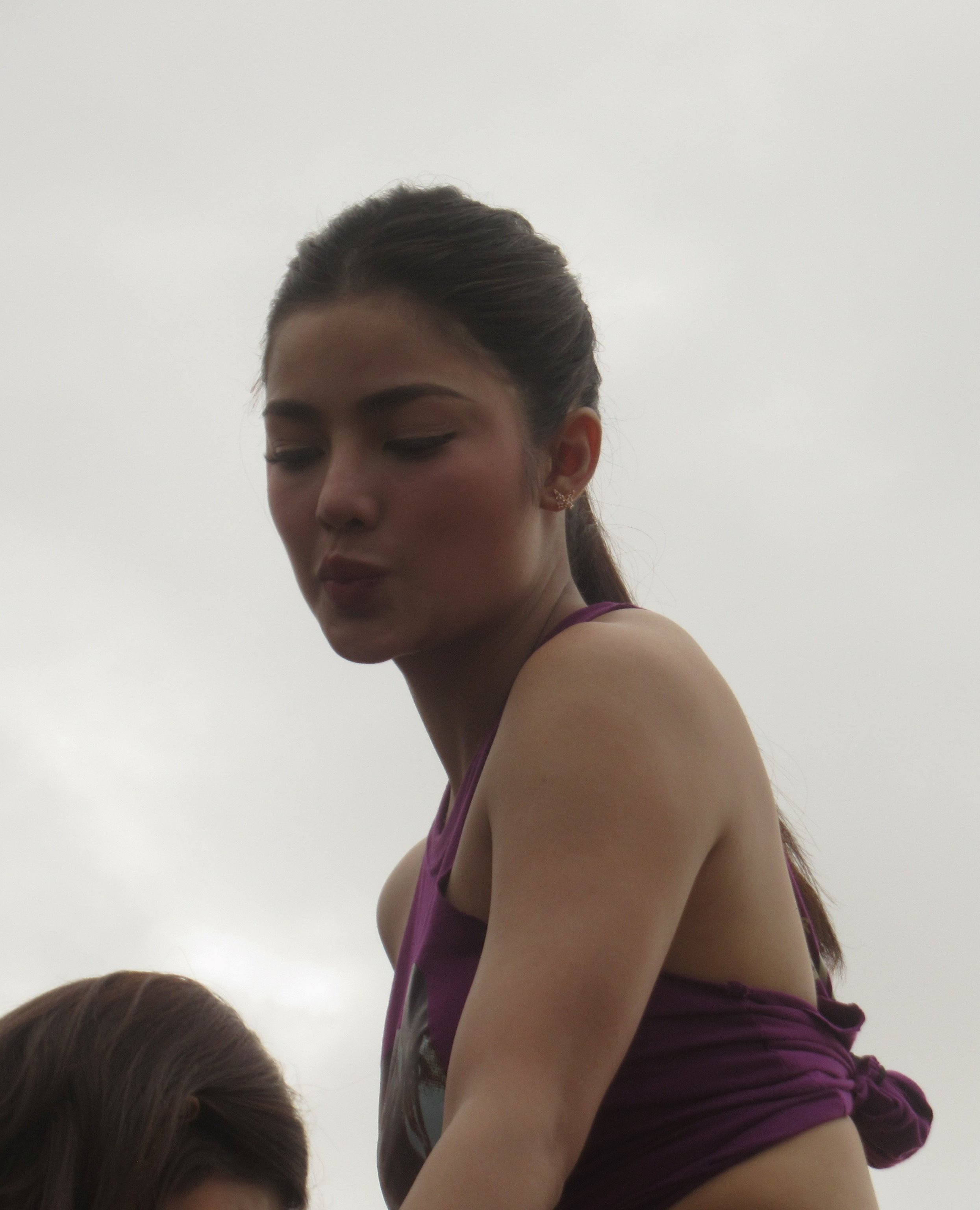
- De Leon in 2024
Awards and nominations
Award	Wins	Nominations
Ima Wa Ima Asian Film Festival	1	1
Metro Manila Film Festival	0	1
PMPC Star Awards for Television	0	2

Jane de Leon is a Filipino actress who has received various awards and nominations for her work in film and television. She began playing minor film roles in 2015 after signing with Star Magic and later landed supporting roles in La Luna Sangre (2017) and Halik (2018). She has been nominated twice for a Star Award for Best Single Performance by an Actress for her roles in the drama anthology Maalaala Mo Kaya in 2020. Her breakthrough came with a titular role in the superhero series Darna (2022) and has since expanded into leading roles, including Shake, Rattle & Roll Extreme (2023), for which she won the Ima Wa Ima Asian Film Festival Award for Best Actress in Japan and Strange Frequencies: Taiwan Killer Hospital (2024), for which she was nominated for the Metro Manila Film Festival Award for Best Actress.

== Awards and nominations ==
Awards and nominations received by Jane de Leon
Award (Note: Awards, festivals, honors and other miscellaneous organizations are listed in alphabetical order.)	Year (Note: Indicates the year of ceremony. Each year is linked to the article about the awards held that year, wherever possible.)	Category	Nominated work	Result	Ref.
Ima Wa Ima Asian Film Festival	2024	Best Actress	Shake, Rattle and Roll Extreme	Won	
Metro Manila Film Festival	2024	Best Actress	Strange Frequencies: Taiwan Killer Hospital	Nominated	
PMPC Star Awards for Television	2021	Best Single Performance by an Actress	Maalaala Mo Kaya (Episode: "Medal")	Nominated	
PMPC Star Awards for Television	2023	Best Single Performance by an Actress	Maalaala Mo Kaya (Episode: "Doctor Hero")	Nominated	

== Other accolades ==
=== Minor associations ===
Awards and nominations received by Jane de Leon
Award	Year	Category	Nominated work	Result	Ref.
ABS-CBN Ball	2019	Belo Beauty Special Award	Jane de Leon	Won	
Asia's Pinnacle Awards	2022	Most Outstanding Female Actress of the Year	Mars Ravelo's Darna	Won	
Asia's World Class Filipino Awards	2022	Best Actress and Primetime Queen of the Year	Mars Ravelo's Darna	Won	
Excellence Laguna Awards	2021	Most Empowered Entertainment Personality of the Year	Jane de Leon	Won	
Gawad Dangal Filipino Awards	2022	Outstanding Fantaserye Queen of the Year	Mars Ravelo's Darna	Won	
Gawad Lasallianeta Awards	2022	Most Outstanding Actress in a Drama Series	Mars Ravelo's Darna	Nominated	
Inding-Indie Excellence Awards	2022	Huwarang Artista ng Mga Kabataan	Jane de Leon	Won	
Netizens Best Choice Awards	2019	Modern Day Renaissance Woman Award	Jane de Leon	Won	
Nylon Manila Awards	2023	Gen Z-Approved Celebrity	Jane de Leon	Won	
Nylon Manila Awards	2023	Favorite Ship (Note: with Janella Salvador)	Mars Ravelo's Darna	Won	
OFW Gawad Parangal Awards	2024	Best Action Heroine of the New Generation	Mars Ravelo's Darna	Won	
Outstanding Men and Women of the Philippines Awards	2022	Honoree	Jane de Leon	Won	
PUSH Awards	2023	Favorite Onscreen Performance of 2022 (Note: with Janella Salvador)	Mars Ravelo's Darna	Nominated	
Rawr Awards	2022	Favorite Bida	Mars Ravelo's Darna	Nominated	
Tag Awards Chicago	2022	Best Actress	Mars Ravelo's Darna	Nominated	
TV Series Craze Awards	2023	Most Promising Actress of the Year	Mars Ravelo's Darna	Won	
VP Choice Awards	2023	Promising Female Star of the Year	Mars Ravelo's Darna	Nominated	
VP Choice Awards	2025	Lifestyle Influencer of the Year	Jane de Leon	Pending	

=== Listicles ===
Organization	Award	Result
ABS-CBN News	Top 10 Breakout Stars of 2022	Included

=== Endorsements ===
Year	Product	Ref.
2019	Belo Medical Group	
2019	H&M	
2020	Ponds	
2020	Nutriboost	
2020	Spotlight Cosmetics	
2021	Yamaha	
2022	Smart Telecom	
2023	Kopiko Blanca	
2023	Freshies	
2023	Mang Inasal	
2023	Pantene	
