= Cultural impact of Darna =

Impact of Darna in culture

Darna is a character created for comic books in 1950. As an empowering figure in Filipino popular culture, she has since transcended comics and has appeared in a variety of media platforms, including film, television, theater, and ballet. Notably, she originally appeared when the Philippines was striving to recover from World War II, and she came to represent the nation's desire to return to the simpler days.

For over 70 years, Darna has been cemented as a Filipino cultural icon with its continued presence in literature and art. Her mythology has been adapted in 14 films and 4 TV shows. CNN Philippines called her the "Philippines' most iconic fiction hero" for her "sheer ubiquity and popularity" compared to other popular local komiks figures like Lastikman, Captain Barbel, and Dyesebel. Tatler Asia hailed Darna as "one of the most powerful fictional characters ever introduced in comic books". She has also been featured in the renowned comics-related site on the web, Comic Book Resources.

== In media ==
=== In film ===
As filmmakers reinterpreted and recalibrated Darna's image to better suit the times, her appeal increased. From 1951 until 1994, a total of 14 films with Darna in the lead were produced. There were four live-action programs broadcast on television in 1977, 2005, 2009, and 2022, in addition to a 1986 short-lived animated series. Darna was also featured in a number of television commercials for items ranging from autos to medicine.

Era	Title	Starring	Directed by	Produced by	Date released
1950s	Darna	• Rosa del Rosario	Fernando Poe, Sr.	Royal Films	May 31, 1951
1950s	Darna at ang Babaing Lawin	• Rosa del Rosario	Carlos Vander Toloso	Royal Films	August 15, 1952
1960s	Si Darna at ang Impakta	• Liza Moreno as Darna	Danilo Santiago	Peoples Pictures, Inc.	June 27, 1963
1960s	Isputnik vs. Darna	• Liza Moreno as Darna	Natoy Catindíg	Tagalog Ilang-Ilang Productions	August 12, 1963
1960s	Darna at ang Babaing Tuod	• Eva Montes as Darna	Cirio H. Santiago	Cirio H. Santaiago Presentation; People's Pictures	April 14, 1965
1960s	Si Darna at ang Planetman	• Gina Pareño as Darna (also played Daria); Gina Alajar as Narda	Marcelino Navarro	Vera Perez Productions	January 18, 1969
1970s	Lipad, Darna, Lipad!	• Vilma Santos as Darna/Narda	Emmanuel Borlaza; Joey Gosiengfiao; Elwood Perez	THP Films; Sine Pilipino	March 23, 1973
1970s	Darna and the Giants	• Vilma Santos as Darna/Narda	Maning Borlaza	Tagalog Ilang-Ilang Productions	December 22, 1973
1970s	Darna vs the Planet Women	• Vilma Santos as Darna/Narda	Aramando Garces	Tagalog Ilang-Ilang Productions	December 25, 1975
1970s	Darna, Kuno?	• Dolphy, Lotis Key and Brenda Del Rio as Darna	Luciano B. Carlos	Regal Films	March 30, 1979
1970s	Bira, Darna, Bira!	• Rio Locsin as Darna/Narda	Tito Sanchez	MBM Productions	June 15, 1979
1980s	Darna at Ding	• Vilma Santos as Darna/Narda	J. Erastheo Navoa; Cloyd Robinson	D'Wonder Films	February 8, 1980
1990s	Darna	• Nanette Medved as Darna/Narda; Francine Prieto as young Narda	Joel Lamangan	Viva Films	December 25, 1991
1990s	Mars Ravelo's Darna! Ang Pagbabalik	• Anjanette Abayari as Darna/Narda	Peque Gallaga; Lore Reyes	Viva Films	June 9, 1994

=== In television ===
Two television series were produced by GMA, in 2005 with Angel Locsin and in 2009, starring Marian Rivera. The fourth episode of the 2005 series, in which she donned the costume for the first time, set ratings records by receiving a 52.1% rating, the highest of any GMA-7 program at the time. Locsin continues to be referred to as a "real-life Darna" for her generosity and relief activities during times of crisis, including the COVID-19 pandemic and the 2009 typhoon Ondoy calamity. A plot point from Vilma Santos' 1975 adaptation was adopted in the 2009 version, who made Narda physically handicapped, walking with a crutch. That Darna deviates from story traditions by initially rejecting the magical stone and portraying a reluctant hero, something the character had never done before in its history.

In 2022, Darna made its comeback in the small screen, around 13 years since the last adaptation premiered. Jane de Leon played the titular role and her performance was met with praises from critics and viewers alike, putting her in the league of the best actresses to ever play the iconic superheroine. Liza Soberano and Anne Curtis also praised De Leon's portrayal of the role.

Era	Title	Starring	Directed by	Produced by	Date released
1970s	Darna! The TV Series	Lorna Tolentino	Kitchie Benedicto		1977
2000s	Mars Ravelo's Darna	Angel Locsin	Dominic Zapata & Eric Quizon	GMA Entertainment TV	April 4, 2005
2000s	Mars Ravelo's Darna	Marian Rivera	Dominic Zapata & Don Michael Perez	GMA Entertainment TV	August 10,
2020s	Mars Ravelo's Darna	Jane de Leon	Chito S. Roño, Avel E. Sunpongco, Benedict Mique & Darnel Joy Villaflor	JRB Creative Production & Mars Ravelo Komiks Characters Inc.	August 15, 2022

=== In theatre ===
Darna was used in ballet shows as well. A ballet adaptation of "Pilipino Komiks" starring well-known Mars Ravelo comic book characters debuted in 1997. Darna was portrayed in an ensemble by prima ballerina Lisa Macuja-Elizalde. Both ballet productions would later be restaged in 2017 and 2018, with Christine Crame resuming her role in the latter and Regine Magbitang playing in the former, and Crame becoming a well-known figure after starring in the 2003 smash "Darna: The Ballet."

=== Other stage plays ===
==== Ding, Ang Bato! ====
On May 14 to 21, 2018, Ding, Ang Bato! that was presented by the Arts and Culture Cluster and the Dance Program of the School of Design and Arts of the De La Salle–College of Saint Benilde was a dance musical theatre that once more featured Darna (played by Christine Crame) and Valentina (Natasha Cabrera). Staged at School of Design and Arts (SDA) Theater at De La Salle College of St. Benilde on Pablo Ocampo St. and directed also by Chris Millardo, the story is told from the point-of-view of Ding (played alternately by Carlos Serrano, Juner Quiambao and John Peñaranda), the younger brother of Narda, who is born deaf in this version and accompanies Darna in the journey of empowerment. In this version, Valentina is a sympathetic character and has an alter-ego named Tina (played by Lea Roque). The choreography by Denisa Reyes and Ernest Mandap incorporates Filipino Sign Language so that both hearing and deaf audiences could experience the narrative.

== In academics ==
A study by Cherish Aileen Brillon from Ateneo de Manila University revealed that "Darna remains one of the most popular sites of analysis in the academe due to her longevity and far-reaching effects on local culture."

=== Scholarships ===
- Academics Ravanes, Flores and Dingal from the Cebu Normal University published a research paper titled "Darna and Valentina: Republic Era's Strong Women in Comics."
- Academic Estrella T. Arroyo from the University of Saint Anthony began a study entitled "The Heroine Concept in a Filipino Graphic Narrative." The study investigated the concept of Heroine and "delved into a deeper meaning of heroine beyond its lexical meaning".
- A study conducted by Academic Cherish Aileen A. Brill on titled "Ding ang Bato! The Rise of Super Hero(ines) and Violence on Local Television" discusses the ortanceons femalemen superheroes that use violence to achieve justice as an end.

== In popular culture ==
- In August 2022, Darna's return to primetime (starring Jane de Leon) generated positive reactions from the viewers, making its first official tag #Darna the No. 1 trending topic on Twitter nationwide and worldwide. It also drew around 300,000 peak concurrent live viewers on YouTube.
- In the first ever season of Drag Race Philippines, the contestants dressed as Darna in the first mini challenge.
- The superheroine was mentioned in SB19's Gento.
- Miss Universe Philippines 2022 Celeste Cortesi wore a Darna-inspired attire for the national costume segment of the pageant during its preliminary competition. She later made a special appearance in the finale of Darna (2022 TV series) as Kevnar, the Queen of Marte.

== Postage stamps ==
Darna has also been the subject of a series of national postage stamps released by PhilPost on November 15, 2004. The Darna issue 3 cover that Gilbert Monsanto did for Mango Comics and Nestor Redondo's Darna were among those featured along with Francisco Reyes' Kulafu, Francisco V. Coching's Lapu-Lapu, and Federico Javinal and Coching's El Vibora.

== See also ==
- Narda Custodio
