= Gumabao =

Gumabao is a surname. Notable people with the surname include:

- The Gumabao family:
  - Marco Gumabao (born 1994), Filipino actor, athlete, and entrepreneur
  - Michele Gumabao (born 1992), Filipina athlete and model
  - Mitchell Yap Gumabao Sr. (born 1956), Filipino actor, athlete, and politician better known as Dennis Roldan
  - Paolo Gumabao (born 1998), Filipino actor
