= The Debutantes (film) =

- Theatrical release poster
- Directed by: Prime Cruz
- Screenplay by: Renato Custodio Jr.; Elmer Gatchalian; Jenilee Chuanasu
- Produced by: Lily Y. Monteverde; Roselle Y. Monteverde
- Starring: Sue Ramirez; Miles Ocampo; Michelle Vito; Jane De Leon; Chanel Morales
- Cinematography: Mackie Galvez
- Edited by: Galileo Te
- Music by: Alyana Cabral
- Production companies: Regal Entertainment; The IdeaFirst Company
- Distributed by: Regal Entertainment
- Release date: October 4, 2017
- Running time: 88 minutes
- Country: Philippines
- Language: Filipino

The Debutantes is a 2017 Filipino supernatural slasher film directed by Prime Cruz, and produced by Regal Entertainment. The film stars Sue Ramirez, Miles Ocampo, Michelle Vito, Jane De Leon and Chanel Morales. Its first trailer was released on September 8, 2017, and the film debuted nationwide on October 4, 2017, under Regal Films. The film is Ramirez's second horror film after Ang Manananggal sa Unit 23B.

== Plot ==
Kate (Sue Ramirez) is a strange and weird girl who wants to be friends with the popular girls in school - Lara (Miles Ocampo), Jenny (Jane De Leon), Candice (Michelle Vito) and Shayne (Chanel Morales). However the group prefers to bully her instead. After helping the girls with their homework, Lara invites Kate to Jenny's 18th birthday. However, the group played a prank on her during the birthday.

Kate had a nightmare about a curse and tried to warn the others but they continued bullying her aside from Lara. Soon, there was a supernatural entity that is killing the debutantes as they turn 18.

== Cast ==
Main

- Sue Ramirez as Kate
- Miles Ocampo as Lara
- Michelle Vito as Candice
- Jane De Leon as Jenny
- Chanel Morales as Shane

Supporting

- Paolo Gumabao as Albert
- Faye Alhambra as Wena
- Almira Muhlach as Jenny's Mother
- Iwa Moto as Kate's Aunt
- Kim Qquendo as Young Kate
- Juan Carlos Tamayo as Kate's Cousin
- Che Ramos as Lara's Mother
- PJ Anzano as Monster

Guest/Cameo's

- Nicole Mari Beatrice Sales as Jenny's Party Guest
- Alyssa Alyanna Bunyi as Jenny's Party Guest
- Lee Ngan Vargas as Jenny's Party Guest
- Jamaica Grace Morco as Jenny's Party Guest
- Benjie Manansala as Jenny's Party Guest
- Phamela Lucena as Jenny's Party Guest
- Michael Balicas as Jenny's Party Guest
- Arvie Cerbolles as Jenny's Party Guest
- Raph Tuvillo as Jenny's Party Guest
- Rachelle Lorica as Jenny's Party Guest

== Reception ==
The Debutantes earned ₱3.5 million at the box office during its first day on theaters nationwide.

== See also ==
- List of ghost films
- Pagpag: Siyam na Buhay
- Haunted Mansion (2015 film)
- Bloody Crayons
- The Ghost Bride
- Shake, Rattle & Roll (film series)
