= List of Mars Ravelo's Darna (2022 TV series) episodes =

Mars Ravelo's Darna is a Philippine superhero television series that aired on Kapamilya Channel. It was aired on the network's Primetime Bida evening block, A2Z, TV5's TodoMax Primetime Singko and worldwide via The Filipino Channel from August 15, 2022, to February 10, 2023, replacing FPJ's Ang Probinsyano and was replaced by FPJ's Batang Quiapo.

Aside from its limited television telecast, the series is also available for streaming on YouTube.

== Series overview ==
Season	Episodes	Originally released	
Season	Episodes	First released	Last released
1	65	August 15, 2022	November 11, 2022
2	65	November 14, 2022	February 10, 2023

- This program partially airs nationally on a cable channel/pay TV which normally has a relatively smaller audience compared to free-to-air TV/public broadcasters (GMA and PTV among others).
- The series is also broadcast on Cine Mo! and TFC, and through a block-time agreement with TV5 and A2Z. It is also available on-demand via iWantTFC.

== Episodes ==
=== Season 1 ===
No. overall	No. in season	Title	Social Media hashtag	Original release date	AGB Nielsen Ratings (NUTAM People)
1	1	"The Protector (Note: The titles displayed for each episodes are taken from the streaming service iWantTFC and are therefore official.)"	#Darna (Note: These hashtags are taken from the ones posted by the official account of JRB Creative Productions (the one who produced the series) and are therefore official.)	August 15, 2022	10.5%
2	2	"The Invasion"	#FirstDarna	August 16, 2022	10.6%
3	3	"The Strongman"	#BayanNiDarna	August 17, 2022	10.9%
4	4	"The Crossroad"	#DarnaAtExtras	August 18, 2022	10.8%
5	5	"The Stone"	#LipadDarna	August 19, 2022	11.1%
6	6	"Narda's Destiny"	#DarnaIsHere	August 22, 2022	10.5%
7	7	"The Master"	#DarnaStalker	August 23, 2022	9.7%
8	8	"The Aftershock"	#DarnaAftermath	August 24, 2022	9.4%
9	9	"The Apparition"	#DarnaVision	August 25, 2022	9.0%
10	10	"A Mother's Return"	#DarnaReturns	August 26, 2022	8.6%
11	11	"The Shapeshifter"	#DarnaAndDing	August 29, 2022	8.3%
12	12	"The Evil that Lurks"	#DarnaGoodAndBad	August 30, 2022	9.8%
13	13	"An Explosive Return"	#DarnaSavesTheDay	August 31, 2022	9.1%
14	14	"The Snake Woman"	#DarnaValentina	September 1, 2022	9.4%
15	15	"The City's Monsters"	#DarnaCityBeasts	September 2, 2022	9.0%
16	16	"Out of the Den"	#DarnaToTheRescue	September 5, 2022	9.1%
17	17	"Extras Anonymous"	#DarnaExtraChallenge	September 6, 2022	8.6%
18	18	"The Voices"	#DarnaVoices	September 7, 2022	8.8%
19	19	"Task Force Extra"	#DarnaExtraTask	September 8, 2022	8.2%
20	20	"The Smokescreen"	#DarnaCoverUp	September 9, 2022	8.3%
21	21	"Ghost Hunt"	#DarnaGhostHunt	September 12, 2022	9.0%
22	22	"Ghost Fight"	#DarnaVsGhost	September 13, 2022	7.5%
23	23	"Heroes"	#AkoSiDarna	September 14, 2022	8.2%
24	24	"Memento"	#DarnaRelics	September 15, 2022	8.1%
25	25	"Inner Turmoil"	#DarnaAndDemons	September 16, 2022	7.6%
26	26	"Sisterhood"	#DarnaGirlPower	September 19, 2022	7.8%
27	27	"Zero in on the Heroine"	#DarnaHotspot	September 20, 2022	7.5%
28	28	"The Clone Man"	#DarnaCloneMan	September 21, 2022	7.3%
29	29	"A Change of Heart"	#DarnaWheelOfFate	September 22, 2022	7.8%
30	30	"One at a Time"	#DarnaEncounter	September 23, 2022	7.2%
31	31	"Hero to Zero"	#DarnaBoycott	September 26, 2022	7.1%
32	32	"Venomous Vigilante"	#DarnaFalseHero	September 27, 2022	6.8%
33	33	"Guns Up"	#DarnaShootToKill	September 28, 2022	6.7%
34	34	"Darna's Vulnerability"	#DarnaFaceOff	September 29, 2022	6.7%
35	35	"Ding's Vengeance"	#DarnaAvenge	September 30, 2022	6.5%
36	36	"Darna's Bashers"	#DarnaNoHero	October 3, 2022	7.1%
37	37	"Face to Face"	#DarnaTrueColors	October 4, 2022	6.4%
38	38	"The Set Up"	#DarnaFrameUp	October 5, 2022	7.5%
39	39	"Deja Vu"	#DarnaIamValentina	October 6, 2022	7.2%
40	40	"Darna vs. Silent Shocker"	#DarnaSilentShocker	October 7, 2022	7.7 %
41	41	"The General's Right Hand"	#DarnaSuperHuman	October 10, 2022	7.0%
42	42	"Four's a Crowd"	#DarnaRevelations	October 11, 2022	7.1%
43	43	"Abduction"	#DarnaHuntDown	October 12, 2022	7.2%
44	44	"The Dark Side"	#DarnaDarkSide	October 13, 2022	6.3%
45	45	"Stosium"	#DarnaAlliance	October 14, 2022	7.0%
46	46	"Mission Accomplished"	#DarnaFriendsAndFoes	October 17, 2022	7.6%
47	47	"Human Urchin"	#DarnaHumanUrchin	October 18, 2022	7.0%
48	48	"Reflection"	#DarnaBlackMirror	October 19, 2022	7.4%
49	49	"The Facility"	#DarnaMasterPlan	October 20, 2022	6.8%
50	50	"Close Encounter"	#DarnaCloseCombat	October 21, 2022	7.1%
51	51	"Face to Face"	#DarnaVsBorgo	October 24, 2022	6.5%
52	52	"X-Triad"	#DarnaXTriad	October 25, 2022	7.5%
53	53	"Face Off"	#DarnaVsValentina	October 26, 2022	7.0%
54	54	"The Peculiar Pair"	#DarnaVersus	October 27, 2022	-
55	55	"The Search"	#DarnaTrackDown	October 28, 2022	7.8%
56	56	"Rescuing Robles"	#DarnaRescueMe	October 31, 2022	6.9%
57	57	"Darna vs. Dark Brian"	#DarnaEndofDarkness	November 1, 2022	7.0%
58	58	"Feelings and Priorities"	#DarnaKissAndTell	November 2, 2022	6.9%
59	59	"Disarming the General"	#DarnaAlterEgo	November 3, 2022	6.7%
60	60	"Levitator"	#DarnaNewExtra	November 4, 2022	8.1%
61	61	"Exposed"	#DarnaLevitator	November 7, 2022	7.4%
62	62	"The Chase"	#DarnaEvilForce	November 8, 2022	7.0%
63	63	"Jeopardy"	#DarnaInvasion	November 9, 2022	8.1%
64	64	"To Carry On"	#DarnaLethalWeapon	November 10, 2022	6.9%
65	65	"The Agryx"	#DarnaTKO	November 11, 2022	8.2%

=== Season 2 ===
No. overall	No. in season	Title	Social Media hashtag	Original release date	AGB Nielsen Ratings (NUTAM People)
66	1	"A New Leaf"	#DarnaNewWarrior	November 14, 2022	8.0%
67	2	"Luna"	#DarnaLuna	November 15, 2022	8.0%
68	3	"The Hunt"	#DarnaTrackAndFear	November 16, 2022	8.1%
69	4	"Gut-wrenching Gut Feeling"	#DarnaGutFeels	November 17, 2022	7.3%
70	5	"Cat and Mouse"	#DarnaPredaTorn	November 18, 2022	8.3%
71	6	"Green-eyed Monster"	#DarnaFighter	November 21, 2022	7.8%
72	7	"Hiraya"	#DarnaPowerUp	November 22, 2022	7.5%
73	8	"Happy Fiesta"	#DarnaHappyFiesta	November 23, 2022	7.5%
74	9	"Armada"	#DarnaAllOut	November 24, 2022	7.3%
75	10	"Shipwreck"	#DarnaShipwreck	November 25, 2022	7.9%
76	11	"Fake Darna"	#DarnaVsDarna	November 28, 2022	7.2%
77	12	"Goddess of Death"	#DarnaThePurge	November 29, 2022	7.6%
78	13	"Friendship"	#DarnaMissedFriendship	November 30, 2022	7.7%
79	14	"Declaration of War"	#DarnaSnakesOnWar	December 1, 2022	7.4%
80	15	"Test Subjects"	#DarnaMadDoctor	December 2, 2022	7.5%
81	16	"After Effects (recap episode)"	#DarnaAfterEffects	December 5, 2022	6.6%
82	17	"Round Up (recap episode)"	#DarnaRoundUp	December 6, 2022	6.4%
83	18	"The Sacrifice"	#DarnaSacrificialLove	December 7, 2022	7.0%
84	19	"Flame On"	#DarnaNoOnesArc	December 8, 2022	6.5%
85	20	"Love and Duty"	#DarnaLoveBurst	December 9, 2022	7.0%
86	21	"Ticking Time Bomb"	#DarnaTopSecret	December 12, 2022	6.7%
87	22	"Safe City"	#DarnaSafeInTheCity	December 13, 2022	6.7%
88	23	"A Charitable Cause"	#DarnaCharityBall	December 14, 2022	7.1%
89	24	"Unmasked"	#DarnaVDay	December 15, 2022	6.9%
90	25	"Friend or Foe"	#DarnaFrenemy	December 16, 2022	-
91	26	"Fallout"	#DarnaFallout	December 19, 2022	-
92	27	"The Warning"	#DarnaThisIsWar	December 20, 2022	-
93	28	"Death Threat"	#DarnaTrickOrThreat	December 21, 2022	7.0%
94	29	"Hunter and Prey"	#DarnaPreyForUs	December 22, 2022	-
95	30	"First Mission"	#DarnaMerryXtra	December 23, 2022	-
96	31	"Arsenal"	#DarnaXtraSeason	December 26, 2022	-
97	32	"Full Circle"	#DarnaFullCircle	December 27, 2022	-
98	33	"The Ring"	#DarnaCityOfChaos	December 28, 2022	-
99	34	"The Invicto"	#DarnaCrimeAfterCrime	December 29, 2022	-
100	35	"Hopeful Holidays"	#DarnaXtraNewYear	December 30, 2022	-
101	36	"Chasing Criminals"	#DarnaBraveHeart	January 2, 2023	-
102	37	"The Fallen Empire"	#DarnaPartnersVsCrime	January 3, 2023	7.5%
103	38	"Larger Than Life"	#DarnaPowerfulMatters	January 4, 2023	-
104	39	"Pandemonium"	#DarnaDeletedCity	January 5, 2023	7.1%
105	40	"Dark Forces"	#DarnaBorgoWithAnArmy	January 6, 2023	7.0%
106	41	"Bloodshed"	#DarnaSuperSoldiers	January 9, 2023	-
107	42	"Dancing Queen"	#DarnaDancingQueen	January 10, 2023	-
108	43	"Greed and Rage"	#DarnaSuperPowers	January 11, 2023	-
109	44	"Anarchy"	#DarnaThriller	January 12, 2023	-
110	45	"Game of Tag"	#DarnaWeCantStop	January 13, 2023	-
111	46	"Conquer"	#DarnaKnightFall	January 16, 2023	-
112	47	"Purple Mas"	#DarnaCatchingFire	January 17, 2023	7.0%
113	48	"Race Again"	#DarnaDontLookUp	January 18, 2023	-
114	49	"Baggages"	#DarnaDobleTrouble	January 19, 2023	-
115	50	"Entrapment"	#DarnaSkyFall	January 20, 2023	7.0%
116	51	"Vengeance"	#DarnaMindGames	January 23, 2023	-
117	52	"Defense"	#DarnaDefenseMode	January 24, 2023	7.1%
118	53	"All for One"	#DarnaStandAsOne	January 25, 2023	7.1%
119	54	"Retribution"	#DarnaStrongAsEver	January 26, 2023	-
120	55	"Restoration"	#DarnaGoneGirl	January 27, 2023	7.8%
121	56	"This is War"	#DarnaSuperExtra	January 30, 2023	-
122	57	"Inside Job"	#DarnaSuperLeague	January 31, 2023	-
123	58	"Retaliation"	#DarnaSuperRevenge	February 1, 2023	7.2%
124	59	"Reborn"	#DarnaSuperComeback	February 2, 2023	-
125	60	"War Lord"	#DarnaSuperValentina	February 3, 2023	7.4%
126	61	"Venomous Comeback"	#DarnaSuperBloody	February 6, 2023	7.8%
127	62	"A World Without Darna"	#DarnaSuperNoHero	February 7, 2023	7.8%
128	63	"Rescue Mission"	#DarnaSuperSavior	February 8, 2023	8.7%
129	64	"Reclaiming the City"	#DarnaSuperEndGame	February 9, 2023	8.6%
130	65	"Hiraya"	#DarnaSuperFinale	February 10, 2023	9.0%
