= Narda Custodio =

Fictional character in Mars Ravelo's Darna

Narda Custodio (Narda)
- Ravelo Komiks Universe character
- Jane de Leon's character "Narda" transforming as Darna in the television series Mars Ravelo's Darna
- First appearance: Darna (2022 TV series)
- Based on: Darna by: Mars Ravelo; Nestor Redondo
- Portrayed by: Jane de Leon

In-universe information
- Aliases: Babaeng Lumilipad (Note: Before she formally introduced herself to the people of Nueva Ezperanza, she was nicknamed as "Babaeng Lumilipad."); The Protector
- Title: Narda Custodio (Note: Her surname changes in each adaptation, but her first name stays the same.)
- Occupation: Emergency Medical Technician, Cashier, Part-time online seller, Vigilante
- Weapon: Gold Cuffs, Earpiece
- Family: Danilo Custodio (father); Leonor "Zora" Custodio (mother); Roberta Ferrer-Custodio (grandmother); Ricardo "Ding" Custodio (brother)
- Origin: Philippines, Marte
- Nationality: Filipino/Martean
- Abilities: Superhuman; Strength, Stamina, Endurance, Speed, Agility, Reflexes, Hearing; Enhanced Combat Mastery; Flight; Invincibility; Accelerated Rotation; Concussive Force; In Hiraya form (full potential): Cosmic Energy Channeling, Absolute Invulnerability, Aerokinesis

Narda Custodio, commonly known as "Narda" (also known as her alter-ego "Darna"), is a fictional character primarily portrayed by Jane de Leon in ABS-CBN's modern take of Darna, a concept created by Mars Ravelo. The character "Narda" first appeared on Pilipino Komiks (Ace Publications, Inc.) No. 77 on May 13, 1950. Narda is depicted as a beautiful and stronger Filipina who is being prepared to be the successor of the Prime Darna, her mother Leonor Custodio/Zora played by Iza Calzado, as the next defender of the white mythical stone.

Narda was born and raised in Nueva Esperanza by Leonor/Zora and Lola Berta (portrayed by Rio Locsin), together with her younger brother Ding (portrayed by Zaijian Jaranilla). She was physically trained by her mother at a young age to prepare her against the extraterrestrial threats whose after the magical stone to seize power and rule over the entire galaxy. Narda is a master of Kali Martial Arts, possessing cat-like reflexes and speed due to her Martean blood.

== Fictional character biography ==
=== Childhood and origin ===
Narda is the first born of Leonor (Zora), a prime warrior from Planet Marte and Danilo Custodio. At a young age, she was already trained by Leonor to become her successor. Despite doubts of her responsibility, she eventually accepted her fate as the protector of the mythical stone, four years after her mother's death. (Note: The complete episodes of the series are available on iWantTFC for free within the Philippine territory.)

=== Breadwinner of the family, missions ===
After getting fired as a clerk at a convenience store, Narda had a hard time finding a job to support her family. Eventually, she landed a job as an Emergency Medical Technician (EMT) owned by Regina Vanguardia. At the same time, she fulfills her role as Darna, facing threats from extraterrestrial beings and taking accountability of the people affected by the green fragments from the Cyborg that her mother once fought. These people with special abilities are called "Extras".

== Concept and creation ==
Darna has consistently served as a standard-bearer for bravery. After numerous film and television adaptations, commercials, theater shows, and television runs, The Mighty Warrior from Planet Marte has won the hearts of Filipinos for more than seventy years. Darna made a comeback on television over 12 years after the last adaptation aired, with Jane de Leon taking over the role this time.

=== Brief history ===
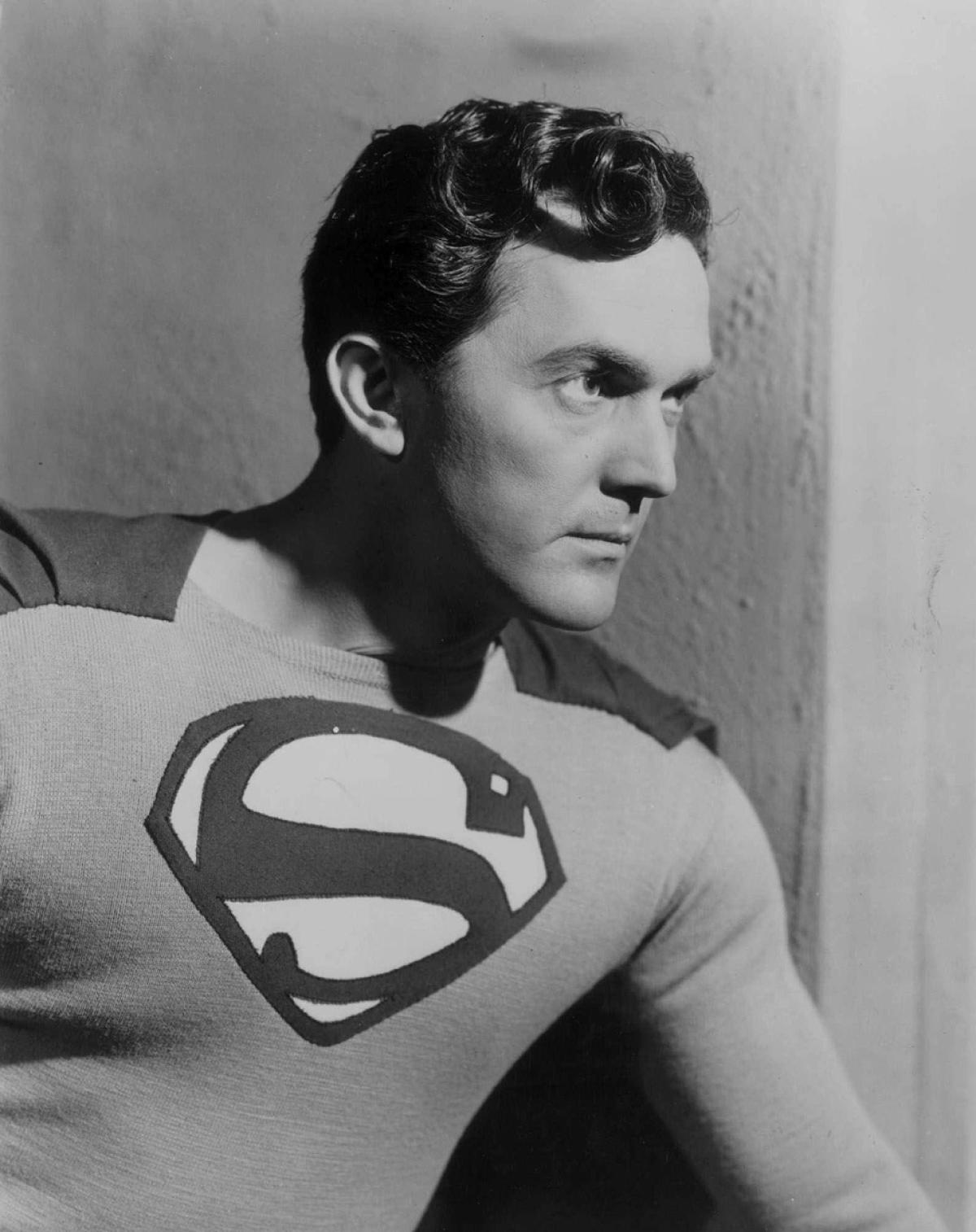
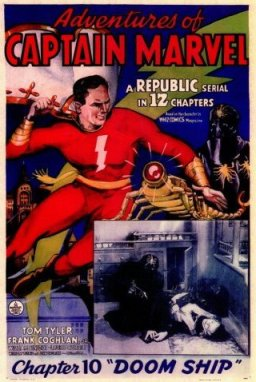
Superman and Captain Marvel (Shazam) are among Mars Ravelo's inspiration in creating Darna.

On May 13, 1950, Mars Ravelo and Nestor Redondo released Darna for the first time (who would later illustrate for DC and Marvel Comics). Darna's debut appeared in "Pilipino Komiks" No. 77, a key installment of the top-selling comic book publication published by Ace Publications at the time. Ravelo was repeatedly rejected by publishing companies from the Philippines and the United States throughout the '40s due to the belief that female superheroes don't sell, even though in reality, Ravelo already had the idea for Darna before World War II; the original name for the heroine was "Varga."

Superman served as the initial inspiration for Varga. Ravelo was inspired to develop Superman's female opposite for a historically feminized nation by his adoration of Jerry Siegel and Joe Shuster's Superman from Action Comics. For the original approach that Narda cries out a magical word and transforms into an adult hero, Ravelo also looked to Captain Marvel for inspiration.

=== Casting ===
Jane de Leon revealed that she almost declined to audition for the iconic role, and that her manager had to convince her to do it. There were several callbacks, each separated by months. She was so frustrated with the waiting that she almost gave up. They were then immediately given a three-page script. She was compelled to go to a formal showbiz event that was attended by prominent celebs. She was seated at a table with the ABS-CBN executives, which made her surprise. She was invited to a meeting with the Kapamilya executives led by ABS-CBN managing director Olivia Lamasan and the network's CEO and president Carlo Katigbak, a few days later and confirmed that she was chosen to revive the titular role.

It was revealed that Jane de Leon stood out among the other 200 actresses that auditioned for the role. A list of potential ladies suited for the role was shortened to 7, according to director Jerrold Tarog. Some of the confirmed actresses who auditioned for the role includes: Maris Racal, Julia Barretto, Ana Luna and reportedly Bianca Umali.

== Characterization ==
Darna's story, which is based on core values such as bravery, family values, and love, will be carried over from Mars Ravelo's original work. This modern version of Darna also honors everyday Filipino heroes like frontline healthcare workers. In keeping with this, the event debuted a mural painting called "Ikaw, Ako, Tayong Lahat si Darna" that featured Darna in her well-known outfit with regular Filipinos including a police officer, soldier, teacher, and jeepney driver. Darna is originally described to have "the charm of Venus, the Roman goddess of beauty and love; the fortitude of Apollo, the Greek god of eloquence and of the Sun; and the strength of Samson, the Biblical hero of great strength."

=== Costume and appearance ===
Filipino comics artist and illustrator Nestor Redondo originally conceptualised a distinct appearance for the superheroine: red bandeau with a gold star on each cap, red helmet with ruby encrusted gold winged accent, gold arm bracred shorts with elets, golden medallion belt with a loincloth at the center and red boots.

In ABS-CBN's reimagined take on the iconic costume, three common elements remains the same: the winged headpiece, the stars on the bra and the loincloth on the middle. However, changes were also made including the addition of a red platform in each side of her hips. According to the costume designer Regi Cruz, he considered Jane de Leon's body frame and made sure she's comfortable in moving when doing stunts. Make-up artist Joel Atienza said that a "fresh and young" look would fit her.

In an exclusive interview with Preview, Christian Mark Rodil revealed that it took around 8 months for the iconic costume to be finished. Its defining materials includes: durable and light materials like EVA rubber sheets, fiber glass resin, and leather. Mark also said he created five different prototypes to choose the final look.

== Powers and abilities ==
External videos
- Darna showcasing her enhanced strength, reflexes and speed.
- Darna faces Master Klaudio
- Darna and Lunas's face off
- Darna faces the El Diablo gang

Every time Narda Custodio swallows the mythical stone, she transforms into the mighty warrior Darna, which possesses supernatural abilities including enhanced strength, speed, flight, and agility and is immune to all kinds of man-made weapons.

- Superhuman Strength: Darna is capable of lifting massive debris with one hand, throw enemies several miles away, effortlessly overpower her adversaries and crush man-made weapons like guns in seconds. However, few powerful enough beings were seen to be able to contend against her in this regard.
- Enhanced Reflexes: Darna can swiftly dodge and maneuver around complex attacks. She was able to use this skill to dodge attacks from Master Klaudio/Hergis during their first encounter.
- Superhuman Speed: Darna also has a wide range of speed levels. She can move from one place to another in a matter of seconds and thus could outpace or pursue all living beings, be so on foot or in flight. This is one of her most used abilities which she mainly uses to either chase or attack her opponents.
- Invincibility: Darna is immune to all forms of physical attacks and has a high level of survivability. She is immune to grenade explosions and bullet attacks. Weapons like daggers cannot penetrate her skin. However, she can still feel and sustain damage from harm of non-mundane sources – such as those of extra-terrestrial origins.
- Enhanced Combat Mastery: Darna is skilled in combat, beating the toughest of opponents and dozens of aggressors at once. She has shown mastery in Kali Martial Arts and was notably trained by the experienced warriors from Planet Marte (Zora and Luna). Darna has also shown mastery in hand-to-hand combat, commonly used for both offense and defense.
- Flight: Darna is also blessed with the ability to fly at great heights.
- Sound Detection/Enhanced Hearing: Darna also has a heightened sense of hearing. She can detect sound waves wherever the source comes from, even if it's invisible, to home in on the sound's source, in a somewhat similar principle to sonar.
- Accelerated Rotation: Darna has the ability to create a strong wind force by spinning really fast to manipulate the air and wind. She first used this to extinguish the fire at the Charity Ball.
- Concussive Force: Darna also has the power to release a strong energy force, knocking her opponents and can cause fatal damage. She first used this to take down an infected Noah who possesses pyrokinesis.
- Indomitable Will: Darna has an unbreakable willpower. No matter how heavy the cards are stacked against her, she will not give up despite suffering severe bodily agony and psychological trauma.

=== Weaponry and equipment ===
- Gold Cuffs (Bracelets) – Darna has two bracelets in each of her wrist. She uses these mostly for defense, to deflect bullets and to protect herself from any physical or magical attack against her opponents.
- Earpiece – a device made by Ding for them to have efficient communication when she goes on missions.

=== Darna's Hiraya form ===
In the last two episodes of the series, Darna unleashed "Hiraya" which is said to be her reaching the full potential of her powers. Hiraya consists of performing seven combat stances of Marte in a particular order. These stances are courage, integrity, self-confidence, hardwork and determination, discipline, patience, and kindness.

- Absolute Invulnerability: While in her Hiraya form, Darna becomes immune to all kinds of damage, be it physical, spiritual or psychic. This was evident when Darna was contained and even survived an explosion that has enough force to destroy Earth.
- Cosmic Energy Channeling: As her whole body glows after successfully performing the seven stances of Marte, Darna summons energy from the cosmos and enhances the powers of the mythical stone to its full potential.
- Aerokinesis: At the peak of her full potential, Darna showcases control over wind and air. She can generate tornadoes and control her opponents with it.

== Reception ==
Despite receiving criticisms initially after being announced as this generation's Darna, Jane de Leon's performance as the titular role was met with praises from both critics and viewers. The pilot episode became the number-one trending topic worldwide on Twitter. Ryan Oquiza from Rappler called her portrayal as "sincere and genuine". Chito S. Roño (the one who directed the first two weeks of the series) said that he was heavily impressed by Jane de Leon's performance saying "she has done very well."

=== Accolades and recognition ===
This section documents all awards, nominations and recognition given to Jane de Leon for her portrayal as Darna.

Year	Awards ceremony	Title	Result	Ref.
2022	Inding-Indie Excellence Awards	Huwarang Artista ng Mga Kabataan	Won	
2022	Asia's Pinnacle Awards	Most Outstanding Female Actress of the Year	Won	
2022	6th Outstanding Men and Women of the Philippines	Special Award	Won	
2022	TC Candler	100 Most Beautiful Faces in the World of 2022	Nominated	
2022	3rd Annual Tag Awards Chicago	Best Actress	Pending	
2022	Rawr Awards 2022	Favorite Bida	Nominated	

== Adversaries ==
As the ultimate hero of Nueva Esperanza and the protector of the mythical stone, Darna has fought against many powerful entities:

=== Main antagonista ===
- Valentina: "The Serpent Queen" and Darna's archenemy. She is Borgo's most powerful weapon against Darna and also has extraordinary powers including Life-force Absorption, Extending Snake Tendrils, Superhuman Strength, Invulnerability, Enhanced Leap, Regenerative Healing Factor, Enhanced Flexibility/Agility, Snake Manipulation, Visual Linking, Enhanced Stealth, Night Vision and Gorgon Physiology.
- Heneral Borgo: An extraterrestrial being who has plans of taking control of the entire galaxy using the mythical stone in Darna's possession. He has shapeshifting abilities, a smart strategist and disguises as Regina Vanguardia's father as an accomplished businessman.
- Xandra/Ishna: Borgo's right hand. As a skilled combatant, she moves around the town of Nueva Esperanza to manipulate humans. She has shapeshifting abilities and has advanced weaponry.

==== The extras ====
- Strength Man (Fredo): possesses superhuman strength used to destroy ams smash anything in sight.
- Lindol Man (Javier): can generate earthquakes to cause commotion and has limited geokinesis abilities.
- Killer Ghost: Can pass through walls by being invisible.
- Clone Man (Vince): he can generate multiple clones of himself which he uses to escape and manipulate his opponents.
- Silent Shocker: The most powerful extra, he can create electrical blasts using electrokinesis, as well as deflect bullets using an energy shield created from electricity.
- Human Urchin: The first female extra that has killer spikes that resemble the components of human bone.
- Dragon Mouth (Inno): A member of the x-triad, that has the ability to spew acid fluid that melts anything it touches.
- The Seductress (Klara): A member of the x-triad, which possesses hypnotic powers.
- Boy Chop-Chop (Miguel): a member of the x-triad that can detach both of his arms from his body.
- Dark Brian: a wicked clone of Brian which came from the reflection of the mirror through the chrysalis.
- Levitator (Eli): Possesses telekinesis to attack his opponents.

==== Season 2 villains ====
- Dr. Florentino Ibarra (Mad Doctor): A scientist in charge of the facility for the Extras. He later on became an extra with powers including: Telekinesis, Limited Pyrokinesis and Power Blasts.
- Noah Vallesteros: One of Borgo's Super Soldiers. He possesses the power of Pyrokinesis.
- Arthur Pineda: A corrupt police officer and one of Borgo's Super Soldiers. He has psychokinesis-like control over junks and garbages.
- Andrei Abesamis: A former EMT and Noahs friend. As one of Borgo's Super Soldiers, everything he touches immediately turns into bombs.
- Sigfried Cruz: A local journalist and one of Borgo's Super Soldiers. His powers includes summoning shield both for defense and offense.
- Mayor Zaldy Vallesteros: Former mayor and one of Borgo's Super Soldiers. He can grow really big like a giant.
- Maisha Rodriguez: Zaldy's assistant and one of Borgo's Super Soldiers. She has the ability to make multiple clones of herself and has the power of Mass Manipulation.
- Anna Villacorta (Manananggal): A beauty pageant contender who won in her competition but in a night her body separated and grows a giant bat wings on back and teeth grown a fang and pregnant women will eat the fetus' heart. She worn a Filipiniana Terno decked with Swarovski Crystals and Pearls.

== See also ==
- Darna (2022 TV series)
- Cultural impact of Darna
- List of Darna (2022 TV series) characters
