= Walong Libong Piso =

2025 film by Dante Balboa

- Theatrical release poster
- Directed by: Dante Balboa
- Written by: Dante Balboa
- Based on: Walong Libong Piso by Dante Balboa
- Produced by: Benjamin Austria
- Starring: Paolo Gumabao
- Music by: Gilbert Obispo
- Production company: Bentria Production
- Release date: October 22, 2025
- Running time: 95 minutes
- Country: Philippines
- Language: Filipino

Walong Libong Piso (stylized as WALON8 LIBOnG PISO) (lit. 'Eight Thousand Pesos') is a 2025 Philippine psychological drama film written and directed by Dante Balboa. The film is a film version of the theater play with the same title, writer, director and lead actor.

== Synopsis ==
The film tackles the hypersexuality disorder and mental health issues amongst the protagonist and antagonist of the story.

== Cast ==
- Paolo Gumabao as Dante
- Jhon Mark Marcia
- Drei Arias
- Juan Paulo Calma

== Production ==
After completing his master's degree Dante Balboa returned to show business to write and direct films. He proposed a project to Benjamin Austria. Director Dante Balboa starts directing and he starts with the film Graduation Day, followed by a live theater play titled Walong Libong Piso. All of the projects are under BenTria Productions. The film version of the production reflects the real time aspect by being shot in a single take, only moving around through zooms and pans.

=== Music ===
The film official theme song titled "Init ng Katawan" was written by Dante Balboa, arranged by Elmer Bancaflor, produced by BenTria Productions and interpreted by Aris Conception.

== Release ==
The film director Dante Balboa first announced on his social media the release date of the re-run of Walong Libong Piso play on November and December 2025 and posted the release date of the film version of it on October 22, 2025, under Bentria Production.

== Reception ==
Accolades received by Jeongbu
Award	Date of ceremony	Category	Recipient(s)	Result	Ref.
Philippine Glitter Awards 2025	November 30, 2025	Best Director of the Year	Dante Balboa	Won	
Philippine Glitter Awards 2025	November 30, 2025	Film Producer of the Year	Benjamin Austria	Won	
Philippine Glitter Awards 2025	November 30, 2025	Best Actor of the Year	Paolo Gumabao	Won	
