= Paolo Gumabao =

Filipino actor and model (born 1998)

- Born: Paul Chen; July 25, 1998 (age 28); Taiwan
- Occupations: Actor and model
- Years active: 2014–present
- Agents: Star Magic (2021–2025); Sparkle (2017–2019; 2026–present); Regal Entertainment (2014–present)
- Known for: Mars Ravelo's Darna; Mamasapano: Now It Can Be Told; Shake, Rattle & Roll Extreme
- Height: 5.8 ft (177 cm)
- Parent(s): Dennis Roldan; Sheryl Sorreta; Pao Chen (adoptive father)
- Relatives: Michele Gumabao; (half-sister); Marco Gumabao; (half-brother); Ryen Chen; (half-brother); Isabel Rivas; (aunt)

Paul Chen, known professionally as Paolo Gumabao (Tagalog pronunciation: [guˈmɐbaʊ]; July 25, 1998) is a Filipino actor and model. He playing the main antagonist in Mars Ravelo's Darna as Noah Vallesteros (2022).

== Early life and background ==
Gumabao was born in Taiwan. His biological father is actor Dennis Roldan. Through his father, he is a half-sibling to Marco Gumabao and Michele Gumabao. Actress Isabel Rivas is his aunt.

== Career ==
Gumabao is known for his dramatic roles, winning Best Actor for the film Lockdown (2021). He gained prominence through projects like Mars Ravelo's Darna (2022) , Sisid (2022), and Shake, Rattle & Roll Extreme (2023). Recently, he has expanded into international film with Spring in Prague (2026) and won Best Theater Acting Debut for Walong Libong Piso.

In 2026, Gumabao is part of the supporting cast for the upcoming ABS-CBN Studios and Star Cinema romantic drama Always Yours, Never Mine (2026). This movie marks his on-screen reunion with Joshua Garcia, four years after they both starred in the hit series Mars Ravelo's Darna (2022)

== Filmography ==
=== Film ===
Year	Title	Role	Ref.
2014	The Firefighters: The Unsung Heroes	Jigs	
2014	Shake, Rattle & Roll XV	Model	
2015	Haunted Mansion	Steve	
2015	My Bebe Love: KiligPaMore	Orwell	
2016	I Love You to Death	Brent	
2016	That Thing Called Tanga Na	Bryan	
2017	The Debutantes	Albert	
2021	Lockdown	Danny	
2022	Silip sa Apoy	Alfred	
2022	Sisid	Jason	
2022	Mamasapano: Now It Can Be Told	Raymond Trian	
2023	Shake, Rattle & Roll Extreme	Moze	
2025	Walong Libong Piso	Dante	
2025	Unconditional	Mark	
2025	Beyond the Call of Duty	Daniel Bartolome	
2026	Spring in Prague	Alfonso "Alfie" Mucho	
2026	A Special Memory	Roy	
2026	Always Yours, Never Mine		
TBA	The Flying Red Balloon †		

=== Television series ===
Year	Title	Role	Ref.
2015	Oh My G!	Ferdinand "Ferdie" Javier	
2015	Maalaala Mo Kaya: Itak	Ryan	
2017	Tsuperhero: Zombie	Zombie	
2017	Encantadia	Amir	
2017	Legally Blind	Oliver Aguirre	
2017	Mulawin vs. Ravena	Ryan	
2017	Haplos	doctor	
2017–2018	My Korean Jagiya	Marcus	
2018	Hindi Ko Kayang Iwan Ka	Raffy	
2018	Ang Forever Ko'y Ikaw	Xander	
2018	Magpakailanman: Ang Munti Kong Pangrap:The Kyline Alcantara Story	Kent	
2018	Contessa	Jigo	
2018–2019	Ika-5 Utos	Frat Boy	
2019	Mga Batang Poz	Enzo	
2021	Horrorscope	Jonas	
2021	Huwag Kang Mangamba	Maximo delos Santos	
2021	Click, Like, Share: Altered	Boyet	
2022	Maalaala Mo Kaya: Bisikleta	James	
2022–2023	Mars Ravelo's Darna	Noah Vallesteros	
2023–2024	FPJ's Batang Quiapo	Lawrence Oliverio	
2025	Incognito	Ramon Destura	
2026	Taskforce Firewall	Medwyn	
2026	Pepito Manaloto: Tuloy Ang Kwento	Raffy	

=== Microdrama ===
Year	Title	Role	Ref.
2025	Naked Truth	Billy	
2025	My Husband Killed Me Three Times	Bruce	

=== Variety, talk, reality and game shows ===
Year	Title	Role	Ref.
2019–2022	Magandang Buhay	Guest	
2022	ABS-CBN Christmas Special 2022: Tayo ang Ligaya ng Isa't Isa	Guest	
2023	I Can See Your Voice (season 5)	Guest	
2023	Fast Talk with Boy Abunda	Guest	
2023–2025	ASAP	Co-host / performer	
2024	Wow Mali: Doble Tama	Prankstar	
2025	TiktoClock	Guest	
2026	Eat Bulaga!	Guest	

== Accolades ==
Year	Award	Category	Nominated Work	Result	Ref.
2021	Lockdown	Filipino International Cine Festival	Best Actor (Gold) (Note: Tied with Jerald Napoles.)	Won	
