= Jane de Leon =

Filipino actress (born 1998)

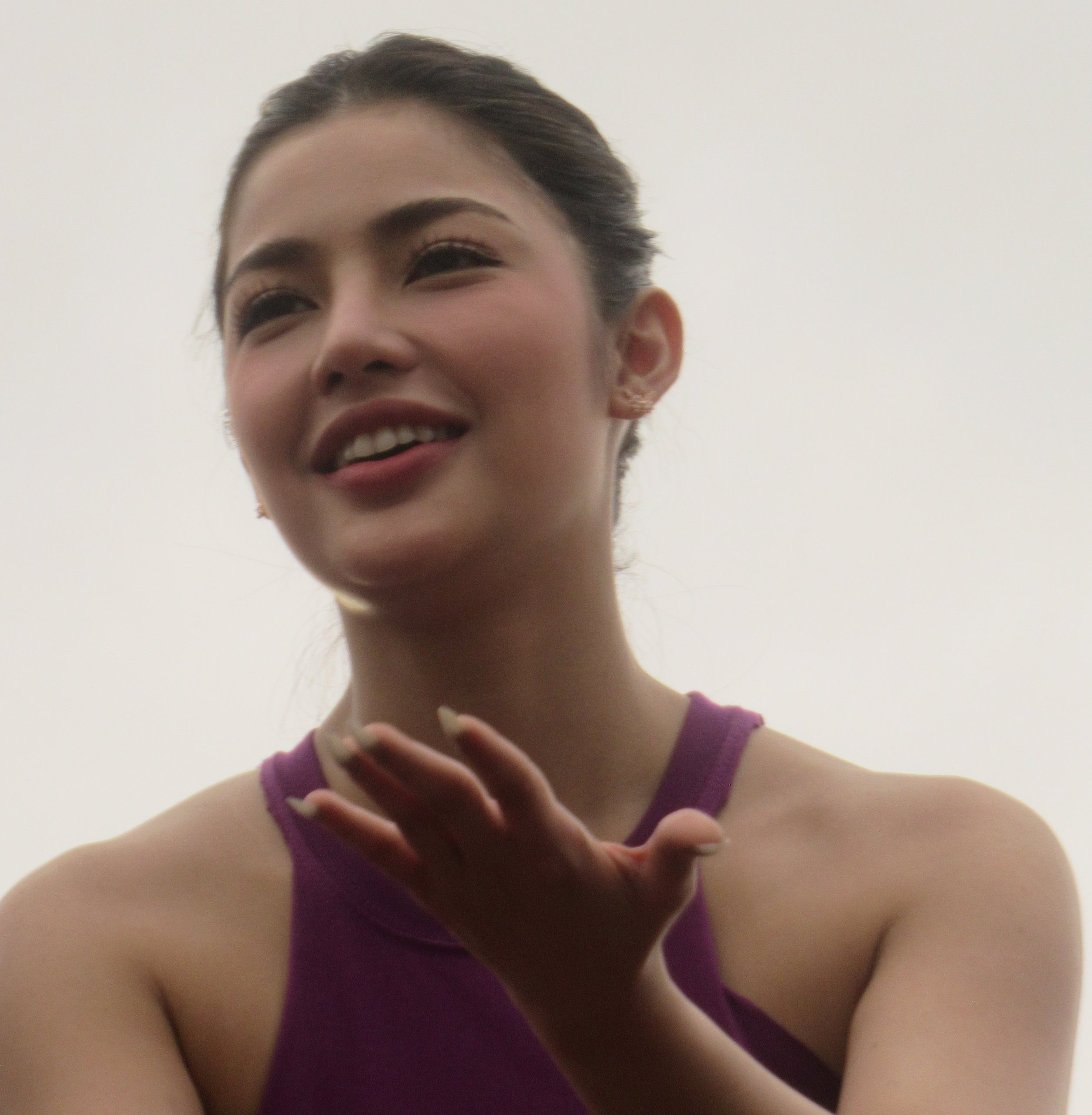
- De Leon in 2024
- Born: Jane Florence Benitez de Leon; November 22, 1998 (age 27); San Pedro, Laguna, Philippines
- Occupations: Actress; singer; model; dancer
- Years active: 2013–present
- Agent: Star Magic (2015–present)
- Known for: Darna
- Awards: Full list

Jane Florence Benitez de Leon (born November 22, 1998) is a Filipino actress. She began her acting career after signing up with Star Magic in 2015. She initially played minor roles in films, made several appearances in drama anthologies and eventually landed supporting roles in Halik (2018) and Ang Probinsyano (2021). Her breakthrough came following her portrayal of the titular role in the series Mars Ravelo's Darna (2022). She has received an Ima Wa Ima Asian Film Festival Award, including nominations for a Metro Manila Film Festival Award and two PMPC Star Awards for Television.

== Early life ==
Jane Florence Benitez de Leon was born on November 22, 1998, in San Pedro, Laguna, Philippines, to Maricor Benitez-De Leon, a housewife, and Ruel Florencio de Leon, a businessman. She is the youngest in the family, with an older brother named Francis. While her family initially lived comfortably, they faced hardship when her father lost his job. This led De Leon to audition for various modeling and acting opportunities to support her family. She revealed in a one-on-one interview with columnist Ogie Diaz on his YouTube channel that she often snuck out at night with her mother to travel to Metro Manila for auditions, as her father strongly opposed her pursuing acting. Prior to becoming a commercial model and actress, De Leon's mother encouraged her to participate in beauty pageants.

De Leon's father had four other children from previous relationships: Ned, Kirox, Carol, and Karen. She attended Sampaguita Village Elementary School and San Roque Elementary School in San Pedro for her primary education, and Sampaguita Village National High School for her secondary education. In 2016, her father died from lung cancer, after which she decided to fully pursue a career in show business.

== Career ==
=== 2013–2017: Early works ===
De Leon began her career by joining pageants and modeling competitions. She joined Teen Supermodel Philippines in 2013 and finished as a semi-finalist. The following year, De Leon signed with Glamoure Talent Agency Inc. and landed her first TV commercial for the brand Quake Overload. She was discovered by talent manager Tyrone Escalante, who convinced her to venture acting, and started doing acting workshops with Star Magic right after. In 2015, she began playing minor roles in films. Her first film appearance was an uncredited character in the romantic comedy Just The Way You Are. Later in 2015, she played a supporting role in the romantic drama Ex with Benefits. De Leon also auditioned to be part of the noontime show Eat Bulaga! and Simon Fuller's group Now United but lost to Maine Mendoza and Bailey May.

In 2016, she was launched as one of the members of the noontime show It's Showtime's girl group GirlTrends alongside Loisa Andalio, Maris Racal, and Barbie Imperial. The same year, she made her TV debut in a Wansapanataym episode "Tikboyong", where she played the love interest of McCoy de Leon' s character. She also began appearing occasionally in the drama anthologies Maalaala Mo Kaya and Ipaglaban Mo!. In 2017, De Leon was cast in the action fantasy series La Luna Sangre as Lauren Catapang. The same year, she appeared in two film productions. She played major roles in the slasher film The Debutantes and the advocacy film Jose Bartolome: Guro.

=== 2018–2022: Breakthrough ===
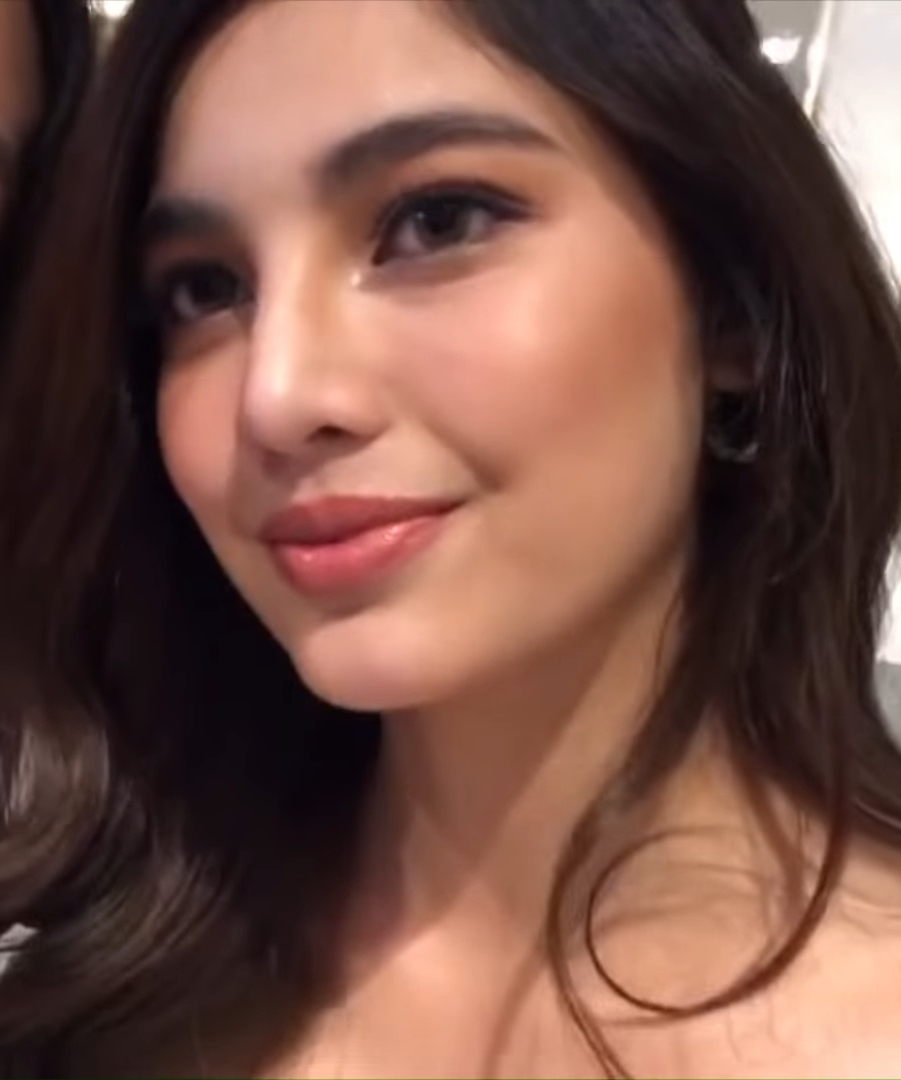
De Leon during a 2020 interview

In 2018, De Leon played the feisty sister of Jericho Rosales' character in the drama series Halik. She also played a supporting role in Jose Javier Reyes' film Walwal. In 2019, she played a cameo role in the film The Heiress. After Liza Soberano backed out due to finger injury, De Leon was announced as the actress to play the title character in the film Darna in July 2019. Director Olivia Lamasan explained that De Leon earned the unanimous vote of ABS-CBN executives and Darna director Jerold Tarog. It was even Tarog who presented De Leon's audition tapes to the executives and according to him, De Leon impressed him for being an "instinctive actress." However, in August 2020, it was announced that the film project would be postponed indefinitely due to the COVID-19 pandemic and a Darna TV series, also starring De Leon, would be developed in its place.

While the project was indefinitely postponed, De Leon joined the cast of Ang Probinsyano in 2021 where she played the agent Natalia Mante. After seven months on the show, she made her exit and started preparing for her role as Darna. She started vigorous trainings and worked out to prepare for her fight scenes required for the role. She also had to practice modulating her voice for her character's signature yell. In August 2022, Darna finally premiered on television. Her performance was met with praises from critics and viewers. Ryan Oquiza of Rappler called her portrayal as "sincere and genuine". Chito S. Roño stated that he was impressed by De Leon's performance saying: "she has done very well."

=== 2023–present: Recent projects ===
De Leon starred in the comeback film of the longest-running horror franchise, Shake, Rattle & Roll Extreme (2023) with Iza Calzado and Jane Oineza. It was released at an earlier date after not making it to the Metro Manila Film Festival. While the film received mixed reviews from the critics, her performance was praised. Writing for The Philippine Star, Januar Junior Aguja described De Leon as the highlight of the "Rage" episode, saying her character had "the most interesting character development". She is set to reunite with Janella Salvador in the upcoming film How to Be a Good Wife.

== Other ventures ==
=== Philanthropy ===
In September 2019, De Leon was announced as the winner for the Belo Beauty Special Award at the annual ABS-CBN Ball. During the interview with ABS-CBN, she revealed that instead of taking the proceeds from the award, she decided to give it all to the beneficiary of the said Ball - the social welfare programme, Bantay Bata 163. This foundation aims to protect disadvantaged and at-risk children through a nationwide network of social services. De Leon said that it is better to be an example to help these children, who may have their own ideas on what they want for the future lives. In the same year, De Leon also attended the Red Charity Gala, to raise funds for the Philippine Red Cross, a non-profit humanitarian organization and a member of the International Red Cross and Red Crescent Movement.

== Filmography ==
=== Film ===
Key
†	Denotes films that have not yet been released

Year	Title	Role	Ref.
2015	Just the Way You Are	Bit role	
2015	Ex With Benefits	Arki's sister	
2017	The Debutantes	Jenny	
2017	Jose Bartolome: Guro	Salve	
2018	Walwal	Carla	
2019	The Heiress	Young Luna	
2023	Shake, Rattle & Roll Extreme	Trina	
2024	Strange Frequencies: Taiwan Killer Hospital	Jane	
TBA	How to Be a Good Wife†	TBA	
TBA	Battle Ready†	TBA	

=== Television ===
Key
†	Denotes shows that have not yet been aired

Jane de Leon's television credits with year of release, title(s) and role
Year	Title	Role	Ref.
2016	Wansapanataym: Tikboyong	Sassy	
2016	Maalaala Mo Kaya: Gitara	Apple	
2016	Maalaala Mo Kaya: Pantalan	Sally	
2016	Maalaala Mo Kaya: Karnabal	Vilma	
2016–2018; 2023–present	It's Showtime	GirlTrends member / Co-host / Guest / Performer	
2017	Maalaala Mo Kaya: Tahanan	Angelique	
2017	Maalaala Mo Kaya: Tubuhan	Doreen	
2017	Maalaala Mo Kaya: Diploma	Young Marlene	
2017	La Luna Sangre	Lauren Catapang	
2018	Maalaala Mo Kaya: Portrait	Cesar's Daughter	
2018	Ipaglaban Mo: Bayad	Kate Dollente	
2018–2019	Halik	Margarita "Maggie" Bartolome	
2019	Ipaglaban Mo: Dignity	Tere	
2020	Maalaala Mo Kaya: Medal	Nesthy Petecio	
2020	Maalaala Mo Kaya: Stethoscope	Dr. Lerma Bhelle Iglesia	
2020	Maalaala Mo Kaya: Bracelet	Dr. Lerma Bhelle Iglesia	
2021	FPJ's Ang Probinsyano	P/Cpt. Natalia "Lia" Mante	
2022–2023	Mars Ravelo's Darna	Narda Custodio / Darna	
2025	Incognito	Sylvia Escalera-Jayin / Heart	
2025	Pinoy Big Brother: Celebrity Collab Edition	Houseguest	
TBA	Bride to Be †		

=== Music video appearances ===
Year	Title	Artist	Ref.
2016	"Mahal Mo Pa Rin Ako"	Ace	
2023	"Day and Night"	Alamat	
2024	"Hey You"	Janella Salvador	

== Accolades ==
Since starting her acting career in the mid-2010s, De Leon has received recognition from various award-giving bodies in the Philippines. She won the Ima Wa Ima Asian Film Festival for Best Actress for her performance in the horror film Shake, Rattle & Roll Extreme in Japan. She received two nominations for Star Award for Best Single Performance by an Actress for her roles in the drama anthology Maalaala Mo Kaya in the episodes Medal and Doctor Hero (both in 2020). For her performance in the found footage horror film Strange Frequencies: Taiwan Killer Hospital, she was nominated for the Metro Manila Film Festival for Best Actress.

== See also ==
- List of Filipino actresses
- Cinema of the Philippines
- Television in the Philippines
