= Darna (2022 TV series) =

Philippine superhero television series

- Promotional poster
- Also known as: Mars Ravelo's Darna; Darna: The TV Series
- Genre: Superhero; Science fiction; Action (Note: These are based on the genres displayed on the streaming app iWantTFC.); Drama; Fantasy
- Based on: Darna by Mars Ravelo
- Written by: Ma. Carmela Abaygar; Hannah Rhocellhynnia H. Cruz; Jasper Emmanuel A. Paras; Jann Kayla C. Mendoza
- Directed by: Chito S. Roño; Avel E. Sunpongco; Benedict Mique; Darnel Joy R. Villaflor
- Starring: Jane de Leon
- Music by: Francis S. Concio
- Opening theme: "Patuloy Lang Ang Lipad" by BGYO
- Country of origin: Philippines
- Original language: Filipino
- No. of seasons: 2
- No. of episodes: 130 (list of episodes)

Production
- Executive producers: Carlo L. Katigbak; Cory V. Vidanes; Laurenti M. Dyogi
- Producers: Maya Aralar; Marissa Kalaw
- Production locations: San Jose del Monte, Bulacan; Jalajala, Rizal; Metro Manila
- Cinematography: Neil Daza
- Camera setup: Single-camera
- Running time: 22–35 mimutes
- Production companies: JRB Creative Production; Mars Ravelo Komiks Characters Inc.

Original release
- Network: Kapamilya Channel (Note: The series was also aired on Cine Mo!, A2Z, TV5 and internationally via TFC, and on-demand via iWantTFC.)
- Release: August 15, 2022 – February 10, 2023

Related
- Darna (2005); Darna (2009)

Mars Ravelo's Darna is a Philippine superhero television series that aired on Kapamilya Channel. The series is based from Mars Ravelo's fictional Philippine superheroine of the same name. Directed by Chito S. Roño, Avel E. Sunpongco, Benedict Mique and Darnel Joy R. Villaflor, it stars Jane de Leon in the title role. It premiered on August 15, 2022, on the network's Primetime Bida line up. The series concluded on February 10, 2023, with a total of two seasons and 130 episodes.

== Plot ==
The story revolves around a maiden named Narda who is destined to become the new protector of a magical stone from Planet Marte. After her mother, the first guardian of the stone, dies while they were invaded by beings from another galaxy, she must embrace her fate to become the savior of the oppressed and a warrior of goodness.

== Cast and characters ==
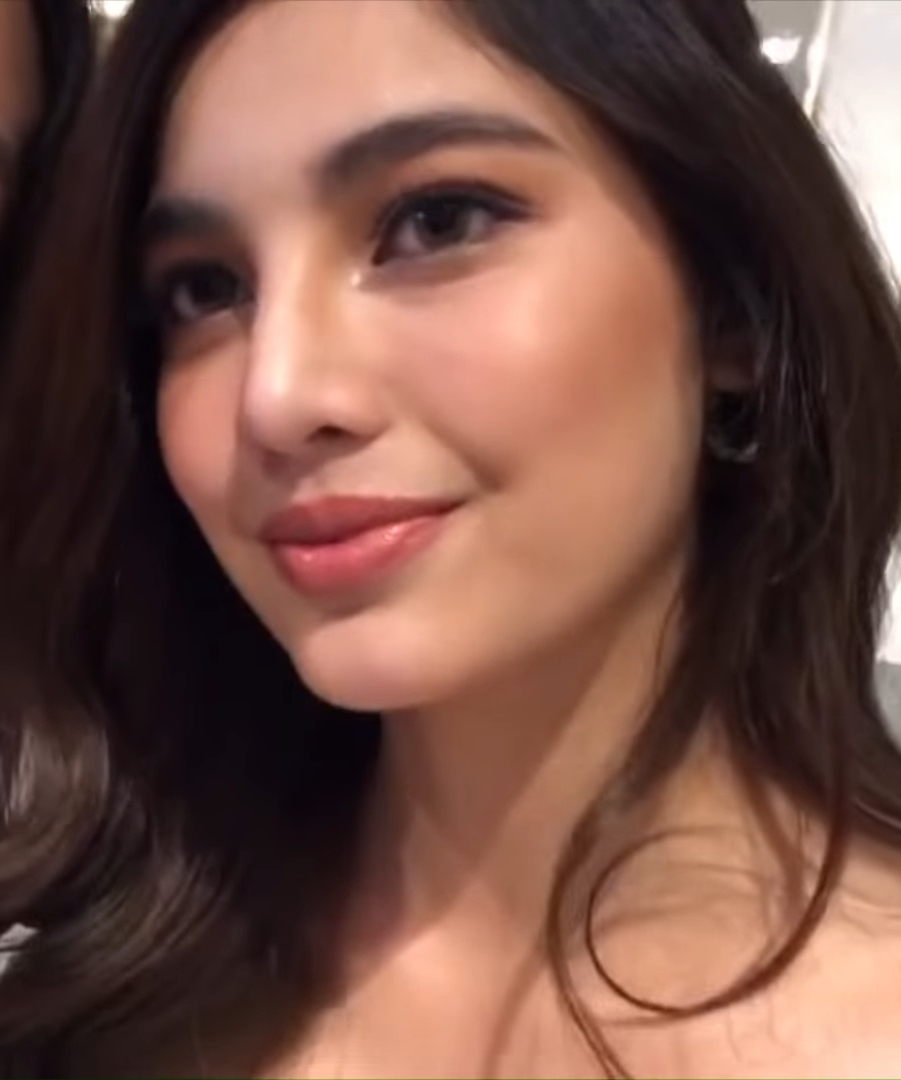
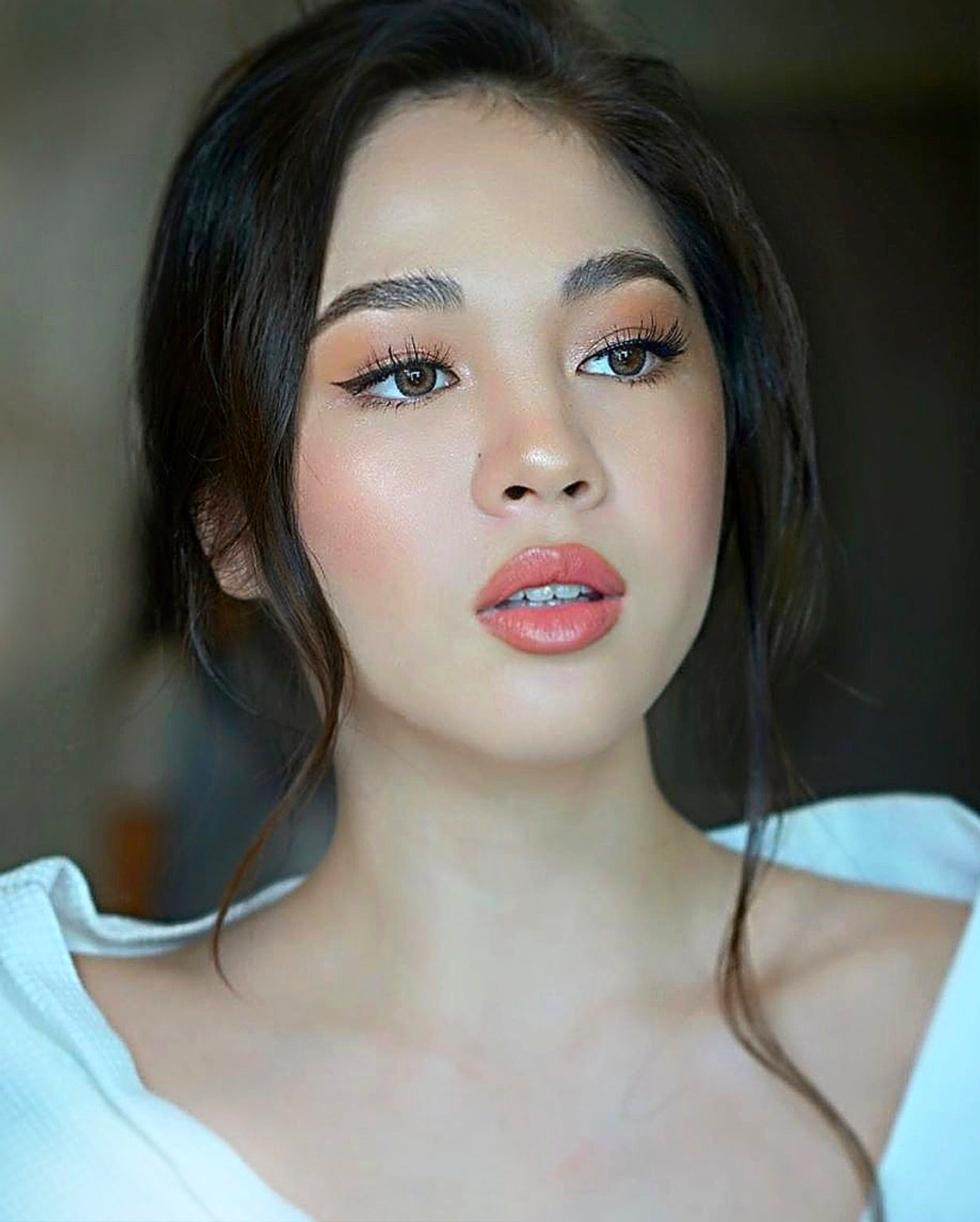
Jane De Leon as Darna/Narda (left), Joshua Garcia as Brian (middle) and Janella Salvador as Valentina/Regina (right).

=== Lead cast ===
Cast	Character	Summary
Jane de Leon	Darna/Narda Custodio	a young emergency medical technician, and the successor of Leonor/Zora as the protector of the mythical stone. She is also a master of Kali Martial Arts.
Janella Salvador	Valentina/Regina Vanguardia	a lawyer and social media personality whose alter ego, Valentina, is cursed with living, venomous snakes for her hair. Valentina is Darna's archenemy. Regina has romantic feelings for Brian.
Joshua Garcia	Brian Robles	a young police officer and EMT. He falls into the hands of his own doppelganger, named "Dark Brian.". As Dark Brian, he is an irresponsible, corrupt, and happy-go-lucky policeman. He is Narda's love interest. He died after one of Valentina's snakes bit him.
Zaijan Jaranilla	Ricardo "Ding" Custodio	Narda's younger brother and sidekick, Ding, is skilled with technology and computer games. He is also gifted with supervision.
Paolo Gumabao	Noah Vallesteros	the son of Mayor Zaldy Vallesteros, who bullied Brian when they were younger. He later develops romantic feelings for Narda. He turned into an extra after his father injected him with a serum, which he got at the facility for extras. As an extra, his source of power is Pyrokinesis, making him able to create and control fire whenever he wants. He died after André accidentally killed him.

=== Supporting cast ===
Cast	Character	Summary
Rio Locsin	Roberta Ferrer-Custodio	Narda and Ding's grandmother; Danilo's mother; and Leonor's mother-in-law.
Richard Quan	General Borgo / Atty. Rex Vanguardia	An extraterrestrial invader from the planet Ludo. As Rex Vanguardia, he is Regina's strict and controlling father. He killed the real Rex Vanguardia in order to watch over his most powerful weapon, Valentina.
Simon Ibarra	Mayor Zaldy Vallesteros / Mr. X	the former councilor of Nueva Esperanza who set up the deaths of the incumbent mayor and vice mayor in order to seize the mayoralty position. He despises his son Noah, blaming him for the death of his wife, Noah's mother. He became an extra with the power to grow into a giant.
Levi Ignacio	Dr. Rolando Villalobos	a scientist who studies alien presence on Earth. He poses as a street food vendor and is close to Narda and her family. He later replaced Dr. Ibarra as the head of the facility for extras after Dr. Ibarra was killed by Darna.
Joko Diaz	Hergis / Klaudio	one of General Borgo's former allies from Ludo. He possesses shapeshifting abilities, enhanced vision and has shown mastery in hand-to-hand combat. He is the one who killed Leonor. In the end, all his memories are erased.
Jerfrey Santos	PEMS Ernie Antiporda	a police officer from Sierra Grande who reassigns himself back to Nueva Esperanza to guide his godson, Brian.
Eric Fructuoso	PEMS Arthur Pineda	a corrupt police officer in Nueva Esperanza, who despise the Robleses. He is responsible for killing Brian's father. He later becomes an extra by Borgo enabling him to control waste and trash.
Kim Rodriguez	Xandra / Ishna	General Borgo's aide. She possesses superhuman strength, shows mastery in hand-to-hand combat and has shape-shifting abilities.
Mark Manicad	Ali Corpuz	Regina's bodyguard who has secret feelings on her. Aside from General Borgo/Rex Vanguardia, he is the only one to know that Regina and Valentina are the same person. He later becomes an extra to get revenge on Darna who he believes killed Valentina. As an extra, he gained heat vision.
Kira Balinger	Luna	a skilled warrior from the planet Marte. She was heavily trained for battle by Zora and had ambitions of succeeding her mentor as the protector of the mythical stone. Some of her powers and abilities includes enhanced strength, agility & reflexes, flight, mastery in all forms of combat and enhanced speed. She is Richard's love interest and Narda and Ding's adoptive sister.
Joj Agpangan	Mara Carbonell	Narda's bestfriend.
Dawn Chang	Maisha Rodriguez	Mayor Zaldy's secretary. She also serves as the eyes and ears of Madam Victoria/General Borgo in the city hall. She becomes one of Borgo's super soldier extras giving her the power to hypnotize people allowing them to copy her every move.
Joshua Colet	Sigfried Cruz	the popular TV news reporter of Nueva Esperanza. He later becomes an extra giving him the power to summon a force field around him and others.
LA Santos	Richard	Narda and Andre's fellow EMT at Vanguardia Rescue. He discovered Narda's identity as Darna after witnessing her transformation.
Mutya Orquia	Patricia "Tricia" Romero	Ding's classmate who has interest about extras. She later becomes one giving her the power of teleportation. She is the granddaughter of Gen. Diaz.
Viveika Ravanes	Maritess Carbonell	a neighbor of the Custodios and Mara's sister.
Zeppi Borromeo	Oleg Mendoza	a barangay watchman and a neighbor of the Custodios.
Young JV	Andre Abesamis	Narda and Brian's fellow EMT at Vanguardia Rescue. Dr. Ibarra's men kidnapped him and turned him into an extra. As an extra he can increase the energy of an object allowing it to explode.
Marvin Yap	Gardo Laracruz	a tricycle driver and a neighbor of the Custodios. He used to be a thief with Vince as a kid, until Narda's mother, Leonor, gave him the opportunity to change his own life for the better.
Gerard Acao	Pancho Paras	a tricycle driver and a neighbor of the Custodios.
Yogo	Jiro Romero	Ding's bestfriend and classmate.
Kiara Takahashi	Jerma T. Chan	EMT at Vanguardia Rescue
Nicole Chan	Danielle Hocson	EMT at Vanguardia Rescue
Argel Saycon		EMT at Vanguardia Rescue
Abi Kaseem	Laurie Quintos	EMT at Vanguardia Rescue

=== Special participation ===
Cast	Character	Summary
Iza Calzado	The Prime Darna/Leonor Custodio/Zora	a “prime warrior” from planet Marte. On Earth, she becomes the mother of Narda and Ding. She was the original Darna who would pass on the magical stone to her daughter Narda before she was killed.

=== Cameo appearances ===
Cast	Character	Summary
Joem Bascon	Danilo Custodio	the husband of Leonor and the father of Narda and Ding. He died before the events of the series took place. He created a comic book, which he left to his family as a way of telling his children Darna's (Zora's) origins.
Jeric Raval	PEMS Jaime Mercado Robles	a dignified police officer of Nueva Esperanza, and Brian's father.
Celeste Cortesi	Queen Kevnar	She is the reigning Queen of Marte.

=== Other supporting cast ===
- Jerald Napoles as Fredo Mitron/Strength Man: A former miner who possesses superhuman strength and can sustain any physical attacks and uses it to destroy anything at will.
- Dominic Ochoa as Engr. Javier Toledo/Lindol Man: Another extra who is an engineer. He wants to reveal the truth about the corruption behind the building of a facility using substandard materials. But the mayor's men stopped him by burying him alive by filling concrete cement on him while unconscious. His powers includes the ability to control and manifest earthquakes at will. He also has telekinesis/geokinesis that he once used to lift big stones to attack the goons.
- Christian Bables as Dr. Alex dela Torre/Killer Ghost: An extra who is a former doctor. He kills his target using poisonous drugs and he has the power to be invisible and pass through walls anytime he wants. His anger starts when his father was bullied in social media because his patient died under his care. He was killed by Brian.
- Enchong Dee as Elijah "Eli" Torres/Levitator: A journalist who is constantly bullied because of being a son of a killer. Because of this, he attempted to kill himself but Luisa stopped him. His main source of power is telekinesis.
- Neil Coleta as Vincent Eugenio/Clone Man: A member of El Diablo. But because of Annie, who became his inspiration to change, he decided to leave the organization for good. Ishna however, turned him into an extra by telling him that there is someone who wants to kill him when he left the organization. His powers included kinetic replication and limited teleportation which he used to produce multiple clones of himself to fight or escape. He was Gardo's childhood bestfriend. He was killed by Valentina.
- Bart Guingona as Mayor Emilio Baron: The mayor of Nueva Esperanza who, along with his vice mayor, died in a plane crash sabotaged by councilor Zaldy Vallesteros in order to seize power.
- Lito Pimentel as Dr. Florentino Ibarra: He was the scientist in-charge of the facility for the extras. He was killed after fighting with Darna.
- Boom Labrusca as Pablo Guzman/Silent Shocker: An extra whose powers include electrokinesis which he uses to disrupt and control anything that uses electricity. He can also form an energy shield using electricity to defend himself for attacks like bullets. His wife and child were killed in an ambush that makes him to support Valentina's way of giving justice by killing criminals.
- Loren Burgos as Prof. Luisa Espritu/Human Urchin: She is a teacher who was stabbed to death by the two men who robbed and molested her, then she resurrected as an extra with the power of summoning black spikes of sizes which have the same components to human bones.
- Karl Gabriel as Inno Camarin/Dragon Mouth: He is a member of the X-Triad (play on extra and triad). He spits acid fluid and melts anything it lands into.
- Jef Gaitan as Klara Balisi/Seductress: A member of the X-Triad, who has the power of hypnotism that she uses to disable her target mentally (specifically men) and command them to do as she pleases.
- Henz Villaraiz as Miguel Lagdameo/Boy Chop-Chop: An "Extra". A member of the X-Triad who can detach his hands from his body. He once used this to ability to steal siopao from a store. He is also Lola Trining's missing grandson.
- Hannah Ledesma as Annie: Tricia and Ding's teacher. She was Vince's inspiration to change for good. She was then kidnapped by Dr. Ibarra's men to use her as his test subject.
- Alireza Libre as Roger Veluz: The man who brought a bomb inside the mall with himself because he wants to talk to the mall owner. He did that to give justice to the death of his entire family.
- Giovanni Baldiserri as Dr. Armando Feliciano: the head of Vanguardia Rescue. He is responsible for the death of Alex's father.
- Jenny Jamora as Sally Toledo: Javier's pregnant wife who is looking for him after he mysteriously vanished, she gave birth with the help of Narda.
- Lloyd Zaragoza as Arnold Bautista: a notorious carnapper of Nueva Esperanza. He asked money to Ali in exchange of his silence but he was killed by Regina/Valentina.
- Dwin Araza as Juanito: a TV talk show host of Juan On Juan along with Juancho.
- Mike Liwag as Juancho: a TV talk show host of Juan On Juan along with Juanito.
- Anne Feo as Dra. Ava Bartolome: The doctor who supported the suspension of Alex's father when his patient died under his care became viral in social media. Because of this, she was killed by Alex by injecting her poisonous drug.
- Lui Manansala as Trining Lagdameo: Miguel's grandmother who Narda aided when she pass out in the street.
- Carla Martinez as Victoria Villacerran: a rich woman who invests heavily in Nueva Esperanza. She is actually General Borgo in disguise.
- Jun Nayra
- Mike Lloren as Vice Mayor Felizardo "Feli" Gizmundo: The vice mayor of Nueva Esperanza. He became the mayor after the revelation of Zaldy's crimes and the fact that he is now already an extra.
- Bing Davao as General Diaz: The general who serves as acting mayor of Nueva Esperanza after the death of Mayor Felizardo. He is Tricia's grandfather.
- Malou Crisologo as Lourdes Antiporda: She is the older sister of PEMS Antiporda.
- Nico Antonio as Vorian: Ishna's older brother and aide of General Borgo. He was a protégé of Hergis. He is killed by Borgo, prompting Ishna to turn her back on the latter.
- Pepe Herrera
- Ketchup Eusebio
- Hasna Cabral as a TV reporter
- Luciana Andres
- Jonic Magno
- Quincy Villanueva
- Rhett Romero as Colonel Malabanan
- Alireza Libre as Roger
- Lovely Rivero as Mrs. Vallesteros: Noah's mother and Zaldy's wife who died in the car accident.

== Production ==
=== Development ===
Erik Matti signed to direct a new Darna film in 2014, with Star Cinema and Matti's Reality Entertainment co-producing the project. Matti stated that the film is aimed "to revive not just the people who knows [sic] Darna but also with the people who will know Darna for the first time." Producing a unique storyline posed a challenge to the director, as he did not want to be accused of copying from other big superhero movies such as those produced by Marvel Studios. Matti envisioned the film, to be titled Darna, as a coming-of-age story that is serious in tone (similar to that of The Dark Knight Trilogy) but with gore aplenty. Angel Locsin, who played Darna in the 2005 TV series, agreed to reprise her role when approached by Matti. Locsin was forced out of the project following a back injury in October 2015, however, much to the consternation of Matti.

A teaser trailer for Darna was shown during the 2015 Metro Manila Film Festival, whose visual effects were provided by Mothership VFX, the same company that worked on some of Matti's earlier films. According to Matti, the teaser was released ahead of the then-upcoming 2016 election as a ruse to make audiences think that Matti's next film was "politics-related". In addition, Matti uploaded a teaser photo in January 2016 of a hooded woman to Instagram. Around this time, the lead actress for the role of Darna had yet to be revealed.

Sources reported that Matti had begun principal photography on the film in March 2018, starting with the "simpler scenes". On October 4, 2018, however, ABS-CBN released a press statement announcing that Matti had parted ways with the network as well as Star Cinema "due to creative differences", and that the studio was closing in on a new director. On October 5, 2018, Jerrold Tarog came on board to replace Matti. In December 2018, Tarog revealed that he had begun working on a new script and costume for the film, the latter he said would be "more practical".

Tarog has said he would retain Matti's vision of making the film a coming-of-age story while also creating a more nuanced origin story that deviates from the previous Darna films and their source comic, which he felt "rushes Darna's origins". He also added that his version will eschew the "campy" portrayal of most Filipino superheroes in favor of telling a nuanced and introspective story where the actions of the superhero have consequences in the real world.

With the postponed production of the film, ABS-CBN announced on December 4, 2020, that it will develop a television series titled Mars Ravelo's Darna slated to air in 2022 and starring Jane de Leon. It is said that the film will push through once the series is finished.

=== Casting ===
While Darna was still in development as a film, several actresses had auditioned to replace Locsin when she backed out in 2015, including Liza Soberano, KC Concepcion, Jessy Mendiola, Nadine Lustre, Sarah Lahbati, and Sarah Geronimo. Soberano replaced Locsin by May 2017. In April 2019, however, ABS-CBN released a press statement announcing that Soberano had left the project due to a finger bone injury she acquired during production for the network's 2018 TV series Bagani, and that the studio had begun casting on a new actress. On July 17, 2019, Jane De Leon was unanimously chosen from a pool of over 300 actresses who auditioned.

On February 6, 2020, Leo Dominguez, Paulo Avelino's manager, confirmed that Avelino has been cast in the film. Tarog later confirmed Avelino's casting during a fundraiser.

Even as the film was reconceived as a television series, De Leon was kept on board to portray the title character for the series. On August 12, 2021, Iza Calzado was cast to portray the first Darna and Narda's mother. On October 5, 2021, Kiko Estrada, Richard Quan, Simon Ibarra, Levi Ignacio, Joj Agpangan, Mark Manicad, Young JV, LA Santos, Yogo Singh, Zeppi Borromeo, Marvin Yap, Tart Carlos, and Gerald Acao were announced as cast additions including Joshua Garcia as the male lead and Zaijian Jaranilla as Ding. On November 19, 2021, Janella Salvador was formally introduced as the one who will play the titular heroine's nemesis, Valentina. On February 17, 2022, behind the scenes photos revealed Paolo Gumabao has joined the cast of Darna. On March 1, 2022, Gumabao was confirmed to have taken over Kiko Estrada's role as Noah Vallesteros. On March 3, 2022, Dawn Chang was cast in an undisclosed role. Christian Bables is the latest addition to the series.

=== Filming ===
Principal photography for the film began on January 19, 2020, shot at ABS-CBN Soundstage in San Jose del Monte, Bulacan. However, on August 21, 2020, ABS-CBN officially postponed production on the film due to the COVID-19 pandemic, a week after the network announced that it had "scrapped" the project "because of the film's big budget (₱140 million) and the coronavirus pandemic."

On December 4, 2020, during the contract signing of Star Magic artists, it was announced that the Darna film project will become a TV series in 2021. On December 21, 2020, during the teaser for Darna in the "Together as One in 2021" video, De Leon said that filming will start in January 2021, but due to De Leon guesting on the series FPJ's Ang Probinsyano, filming for the series was postponed. On February 5, 2021, during a press conference, De Leon stated that the new Darna project will be very modern and her Darna character will be very "millennial".

On July 28, 2021, ABS-CBN announced that the series will start filming in early September 2021 but the schedule was changed to November to give more training time for De Leon, meanwhile De Leon is filming her remaining episodes on her guest role in Ang Probinsyano. On October 4, 2021, ABS-CBN announced that Chito S. Roño will direct the first two weeks of the series. Avel Sunpongco will act as co-director and Keiko Aquino as head writer. Roño envisions the series to be less soapy and more gritty and real. Principal photography for the series officially commenced on November 15, 2021, at the ABS-CBN Soundstage.

=== Marketing ===
On December 21, 2020, a teaser was shown in the "Together as One in 2021" video. On December 19, 2021, a 45-second teaser was shown on the ABS-CBN Christmas Special 2021 together with their other upcoming projects for 2022. On May 16, 2022, a new 45-second teaser which has the same clips plus additional scenes that were not in the last teaser was released on social media. On July 7, 2022, the official trailer has been released.

On June 13, 2022, a tease image went viral after ABS-CBN's social media pages temporarily changed their profile and cover photos to a different logo which resembles Darna's headdress which indicates that it is nearing its premiere. The tease image asks "Nasaan si Darna?" ("Where is Darna?") which made it viral. It gathered a lot of reaction as well as people commenting their excitement for the show, some having witty responses, while others doing photos with their Darna costumes.

On June 16, 2022, a Darna mural was unveiled to showcase empowerment, heroism, and hope dedicated to the frontliners and everyday heroes. The mural also represents a hero on every person bringing hope and positivity to uncertainties and realities.

On July 6, 2022, an official teaser poster was released.

=== Music ===
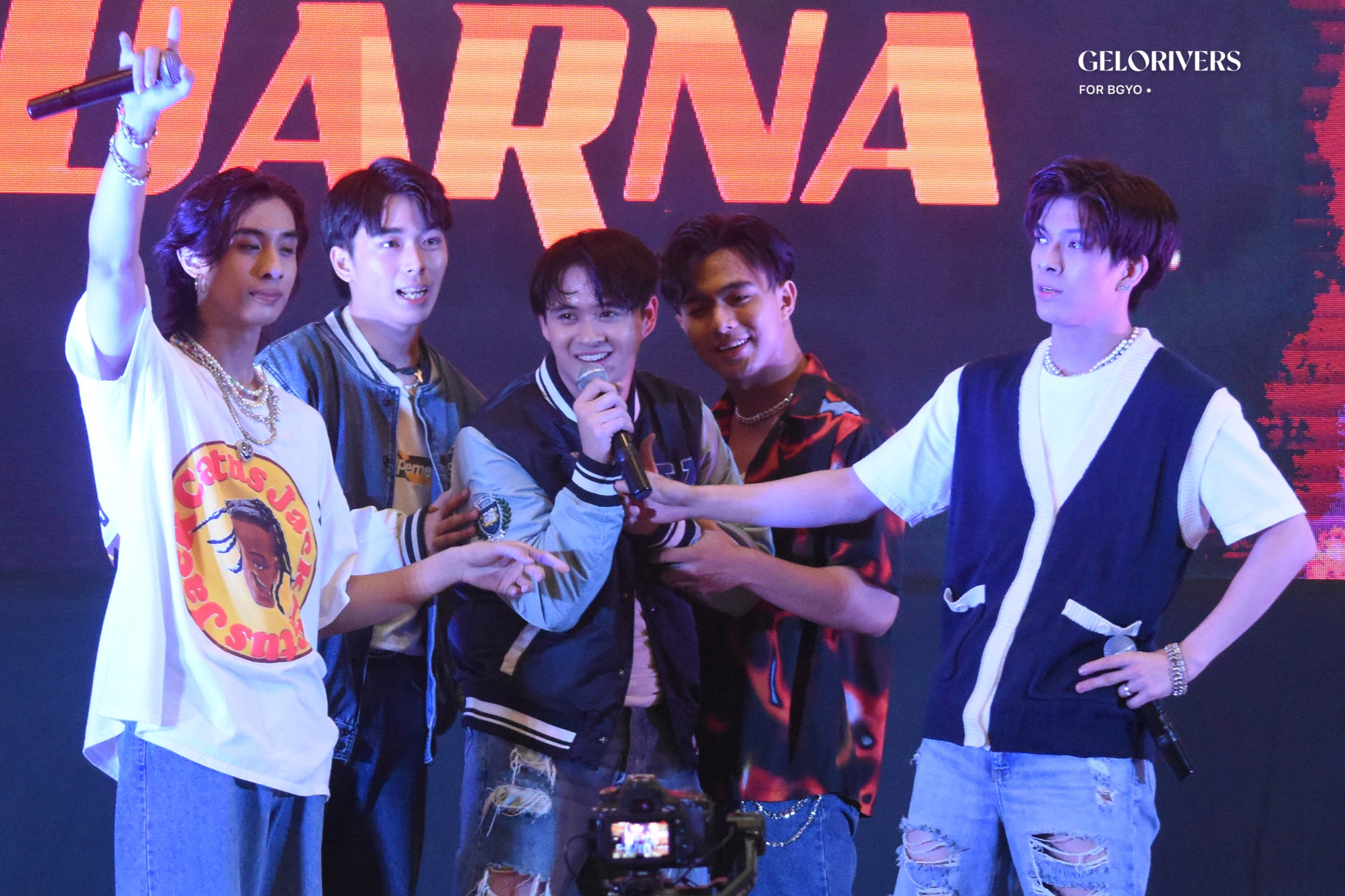
BGYO during the Darna Caravan in 2023.

On July 28, 2022, BGYO were announced to sing the original soundtrack of the series, entitled "Patuloy Lang Ang Lipad". It was officially released on August 14, 2022.

On September 6, 2022, producer Julie Anne R. Benitez confirmed that there are three more songs to be released for the soundtrack.

== International broadcast ==
=== Singapore, Indonesia and Africa ===
Following the success of the series in the Philippines, Darna was featured at the Asia TV Forum & Market (ATF) in Singapore for the second annual TV Asia Screenings Festival. Darna was bought by the ANTV channel in Indonesia and was aired on January 10, 2023. Kiki Zulkarnain, chief program and communications officer for ANTV, noted how Darna's narrative serves as the ideal role model for younger Indonesian audiences, adding: "Darna certainly makes our programming more diverse, and we hope it will not only entertain but instill values in the youth through her acts of kindness and bravery."

The series was temporarily cancelled on January 23, 2023, because Indonesia recently stopped analog TV broadcasting and shifted to digital TV broadcasting. According to ABS-CBN International Sales Division, once the transition to digital TV transmission is complete, new airing information is supposed to be made public.

Darna was also bought by StarTimes in Africa and began airing in July 2024 in English dub in the Novela E Plus lineup.

== Reception ==
Darna was among the most watched television program and drew high viewership in digital platforms throughout its run. The pilot week has accumulated more than 41 million combined views on YouTube and has consistently averaged around 230,000 live concurrent viewers per episode (compared to its rival Lolong with 14,000) on YouTube. Darna was also the most watched program on iWantTFC throughout its run. According to Comscore, Darna placed at No. 3 among the Top 50 most watched shows in the competitive multicultural networks ranking in United States.

Additionally, Darna was also the most searched show on Google, taking around 80% of all web searches in its first week, maintaining a huge lead against the four other local primetime dramas. By the end of 2022, #Darna generated over 2.3 billion views on TikTok. As of January 2023, Darna received a total of 400 million views on YouTube since its premiere.

=== Critical response ===
Ryan Oquiza of Rappler gave a positive review for the premiere of the series calling it "a gritty, modern retelling" that has the potential to even soar higher. Furthermore, he stated that the Darna series also presents an intriguing story of maturation that rewards injustice and penalizes heroism. Oquiza also praised the performances of Iza Calzado, Janella Salvador and Jane De Leon. He described Calzado as the one who stole the show stating that her portrayal as the "First Darna" possesses the gravitas of Angel Locsin and the bravado of Anjanette Abayari. Oquiza also credited the Darna series as one of the shows that will help usher a new golden age in Philippine television, saying: "There has never been a greater variety and vitality for local television since the pandemic started."

Mike Diez from The Philippine Star also praised the series and gave compliments to the pacing of the story, how its origin was introduced and the performances of Iza Calzado, Jane de Leon and Joshua Garcia. He emphasized that Calzado gives the character weight and “exudes an aura of authority.” The Ravelo family said that ABS-CBN is the best platform for Darna, emphasizing the quality of their works and of all the options that they had, the network remains to be the best choice for the comic superheroine and the rights to 13 other comic characters created by Mars Ravelo.

Manila Bulletin included two scenes from Mars Ravelo's Darna on their list of "'Trending stories in PH showbiz that made headlines in 2022' which includes 'Joshua Garcia and Janella Salvador’s kissing scene' that garnered more than 600,000 views on YouTube in less than 24 hours and 'Jane de Leon's transformation as Darna, calling it a "momentous scene", as well as praising her "performance, costume, and visual effects." The series also made rounds outside the country. A recent review by a viewer from Indonesia praised the show, emphasizing the acting prowess of the cast and the show's quality and said that he liked this version better (including Darna's warrior costume) than the last two TV adaptations from the rival network. Spiel Times ranked de Leon fourth on their list of 'Top 5 Best Darna Actresses of all time'.

The Biodiversity Conservation Society of the Philippines applauded ABS-CBN's take on the snake-haired supervillainess, Valentina. It has said to have showcased different kinds of “snake morphospecies”, in which two of Valentina's snakes resembles the Philippine Pit Viper and the Samar Cobra. Further adding: “While we don’t entirely approve of the common association between snakes and villainy in stories, this new Valentina’s snake-do nicely mirrors the rich diversity of snakes (about 140 species) that we have in the country.”

=== Ratings ===
Despite limited reach on free TV, Kantar Media Philippines reported that the pilot episode of the series ruled its timeslot, attaining a reported 19.4% in Mega Manila and 23% in Metro Manila. The series also rated 21.9% in Total Visayas and 22.2% in Rural Visayas.

AGB Neilsen Philippines also reported that the series received its highest rating of 11.1% (fifth episode) on August 19, 2022, placing it in the 4th spot of the rating board. According to AGB Neilsen Philippines, Darna was the eighth highest rated pilot episodes of 2022 and the highest entry for any series by ABS-CBN.

=== Pre-release ===
External videos
- The official full trailer for Darna was released on July 7, 2022
- Darna Official Trailer

The official trailer for Darna has garnered over 5 million views in less than 24 hours across all leading social media platforms, gaining one million views on Facebook in just 4 hours. Meanwhile, the official hashtag #DarnaTrailer immediately shot to the top of Twitter Philippines' trending list and remained there the next day.

=== Weekend debut ===
The pilot episode was well received by audiences. Upon its first airing on both television and digital platforms, the Twitter hashtag #Darna became the No. 1 trending topic on Twitter Philippines and worldwide. On YouTube, the series also drew 296,334 concurrent live viewers throughout its entire run of the first episode.

The second episode maintained consistent numbers, amassing over 250,000 concurrent live viewers on YouTube, and became a trending topic on Twitter Philippines, with the tag #FirstDarna occupying the second spot. The series maintained its viewership in the following days up until Narda's transformation in a later episode, which became the No. 1 trending topic nationwide and second worldwide on Twitter.

=== Finale reception ===
Mars Ravelo's Darna concluded its 26-week run on February 10, 2023. It became the No. 2 trending topic on Twitter Philippines with over 30,000 tweets. The series' finale episode also peaked at a combined 245,059 live concurrent viewership on Kapamilya Online Live, becoming the most watched series of its timeslot online. As a tribute, the fans of Jane de Leon and Janella Salvador initiated their third effort for a digital billboard displayed at Times Square in New York City.

== Awards and nominations ==
Accolades received by Mars Ravelo's Darna
Award	Year	Category	Recipient	Result	Ref.
Inding-Indie Excellence Awards	2022	Huwarang Artista ng mga Kabataan	Jane de Leon	Won	
Asia's Pinnacle Awards	2022	Most Outstanding Female Actress of the Year	Jane de Leon	Won	
Gawad Dangal Filipino Awards	2022	Outstanding Fantaserye Queen of the Year	Jane de Leon	Won	
Gawad Dangal Filipino Awards	2022	Best Actor in a Teleserye	Joshua Garcia	Won	
Outstanding Men and Women of the Philippines	2022	Special Award	Jane de Leon	Won	
Asia's World Class Filipino Awards	2022	Best Actress and Primetime Queen of the Year	Jane de Leon	Won	
Gawad Pilipino 2022 Icon Awards	2022	Outstanding Performance by an Actor	Joshua Garcia	Won	
Aliw Awards	2022	Best Male Pop Artist	LA Santos	Won	
Gawad Lasallianeta Awards	2022	Most Outstanding Teleserye	Mars Ravelo's Darna	Nominated	
Gawad Lasallianeta Awards	2022	Most Outstanding Actress in a Drama Series	Jane de Leon	Nominated	
Gawad Lasallianeta Awards	2022	Most Outstanding Actor in a Drama Series	Joshua Garcia	Nominated	
Tag Awards Chicago	2022	Best Actress	Jane de Leon	Nominated	
Tag Awards Chicago	2022	Best Supporting Actress	Janella Salvador	Won	
Tag Awards Chicago	2022	Best Actor	Joshua Garcia	Nominated	
Rawr Awards	2022	Favorite Bida	Jane de Leon	Nominated	
Rawr Awards	2022	Favorite Kontrabida	Janella Salvador	Won	
Rawr Awards	2022	Loveteam of the Year	Jane de Leon and Joshua Garcia	Nominated	
Rawr Awards	2022	Beshie ng Taon	LA Santos	Nominated	
GEMS Hiyas ng Sining Awards	2023	Best Performance by an actress in a Supporting Role	Janella Salvador	Nominated	
VP Choice Awards	2023	TV series of the year	Mars Ravelo's Darna	Nominated	
VP Choice Awards	2023	Promising Female Star of the Year	Jane de Leon	Nominated	
VP Choice Awards	2023	TV Supporting Actress of the Year	Janella Salvador	Nominated	
VP Choice Awards	2023	TV Supporting Actor of the Year	Zaijan Jaranilla	Nominated	
VP Choice Awards	2023	TV Actor of the Year	Joshua Garcia	Nominated	
TV Series Craze Awards	2023	Best Fantasy Series	Mars Ravelo's Darna	Won	
TV Series Craze Awards	2023	Most Promising Actress of the Year	Jane de Leon	Won	
TV Series Craze Awards	2023	Kontrabida of the Year	Janella Salvador	Won	
TV Series Craze Awards	2023	Most Popular Celebrity TikToker	Joshua Garcia	Won	
Nylon Manila (Big, Bold, Brave) Awards	2023	Favorite Ship	Jane de Leon & Janella Salvador	Won	
Nylon Manila (Big, Bold, Brave) Awards	2023	Gen Z-Approved Celebrity	Jane de Leon	Won	
Southeast Asian Achievement Awards	2023	Best Supporting Actor	Richard Quan	Won	
Southeast Asian Achievement Awards	2023	Best Supporting Actress	Janella Salvador	Won	
PUSH Awards	2023	Favorite Onscreen Performance of 2022	Jane de Leon	Nominated	
PUSH Awards	2023	Favorite Onscreen Performance of 2022	Janella Salvador	Nominated	
Saludo Excellence Awards	2023	Best Kontrabida for Television	Janella Salvador	Won	
Golden Laurel: LPU Batangas Media Awards	2023	Best Drama Actor	Joshua Garcia	Won	
Golden Laurel: LPU Batangas Media Awards	2023	Best Drama Series	Mars Ravelo's Darna	Nominated	
Golden Laurel: LPU Batangas Media Awards	2023	Best Drama Actress	Jane de Leon	Nominated	

== Re-runs ==
On January 19, 2024, ABS-CBN announced that Mars Ravelo's Darna will re-air on Kapamilya Channel's Kapamilya Gold afternoon block, Kapamilya Online Live and A2Z's Zuper Hapon block from January 29 to July 26, 2024, replacing Nag-aapoy na Damdamin and was replaced by the re-run of The Killer Bride.

== See also ==
- List of Kapamilya Channel original programming
- List of A2Z (TV channel) original programming
- List of Mars Ravelo's Darna (2022 TV series) episodes
- Narda Custodio
