= List of films produced and released by Viva Films =

This is a list of feature-length theatrical films produced and released by the Filipino motion picture company Viva Films since its foundation in 1981.

All films listed are theatrical releases and/or Filipino-based films unless specified.

- Films labeled with a ‡ symbol signify a direct-to-video or streaming release exclusively through Vivamax or Viva Prime
- A † symbol signifies a premium video on demand release through Vivamax or Viva One
- A * symbol signifies third party releases

== 1980s ==
- P.S. I Love You (1981)
- Sinasamba Kita (1982)
- My Only Love (1982)
- Forgive and Forget (1982)
- Cross My Heart (1982)
- Gaano Kadalas ang Minsan? (1982)
- Friends in Love (1983)
- Palabra de Honor (1983)
- Sana Bukas pa ang Kahapon (1983)
- Paano Ba ang Mangarap? (1983)
- To Love Again (1983)
- Saan Darating ang Umaga (1983)
- Init sa Magdamag (1983)
- Minsan Pa Nating Hagkan ang Nakaraan (1983)
- Dugong Buhay (1983)
- Laruan (1983)
- Bago Kumalat ang Kamandag (1983)
- Kung Mahawi Man ang Ulap (1984)
- Bagets (1984)
- Dapat Ka Bang Mahalin? (1984)
- Working Girls (1984)
- Bukas Luluhod ang Mga Tala (1984)
- Somewhere (1984)
- Hotshots (1984)
- Mga Batang Yagit (1984)
- Baby Tsina (1984)
- May Daga sa Labas ng Lungga (1984)
- Bagets 2 (1984)
- Sa Hirap at Ginhawa (1984)
- Kapag Puso'y Sinugatan (1985)
- Working Boys (1985)
- Bituing Walang Ningning (1985)
- Sa Totoo Lang! (1985)
- Isla (1985)
- Ma'am May We Go Out? (1985)
- Muling Buksan ang Puso (1985)
- Beloved (1985)
- Pati Ba Pintig ng Puso? (1985)
- Like Father, Like Son (1985)
- Tinik sa Dibdib (1985)
- Doctor Doctor We Are Sick (1985)
- Kailan Sasabihing Mahal Kita (1985)
- Binhi (1985)
- Bala Ko ang Hahatol (1985)
- Kailan Ba Tama ang Mali? (1986)
- Kamagong (1986)
- Send in the Clowns (1986)
- Palimos ng Pag-Ibig (1986)
- Ninja Kids and the Samurai Sword (1986)
- Bukas, Uulan ang Bala (1986)
- Sana'y Wala Nang Wakas (1986)
- Magdusa Ka (1986)
- Nakagapos na Puso (1986)
- Gabi Na, Kumander (1986)
- Captain Barbell (1986)

=== 1987 ===
Film	Release	Notes
Kung Aagawin Mo ang Lahat sa Akin	February 19	
Anak ng Lupa	March 11	
Alabok ang Ulap	March 26	
Maging Akin Ka Lamang	May 7	
Jack & Jill	June 10	
Balweg	July 8	
Working Girls 2	July 22	
Saan Nagtatago ang Pag-Ibig?	September 7	
Pasan Ko ang Daigdig	September 30	
Puto	November 4	
Oscar Ramos: Hitman	November 11	
Walang Karugtong ang Nakaraan	November 26	

=== 1988 ===
Film	Release	Notes
Huwag Mong Itanong Kung Bakit	January 4	
The Untouchable Family	January 13	Released through Falcon Films
Misis Mo, Misis Ko	February 10	
Afuang: Bounty Hunter	February 25	
Hati Tayo sa Magdamag	March 9	
Akyat Bahay Gang	April 20	Released through Falcon Films
Boy Negro	June 2	
Buy One, Take One	June 18	
Sheman: Mistress of the Universe	September 7	
Kumander Bawang: Kalaban ng Mga Aswang	September 29	
Paano Tatakasan ang Bukas?	October 6	
I Love You 3x a Day	November 9	
Smith & Wesson	November 16	
Jack and Jill sa Amerika	November 30	
Pik Pak Boom	December 25	

=== 1989 ===
Film	Release	Notes
Ang Lahat ng Ito Pati Na ang Langit	January 11	
Macho Dancer	January 18	
Mars Ravelo's Bondying: The Little Big Boy	January 25	
3 Mukha ng Pag-ibig	February 7	
Bakit Iisa Lamang ang Puso	March 8	
Eagle Squad	April 5	
M&M: The Incredible Twins	May 16	
Kahit Wala Ka Na	May 31	
Ang Pumatay nang Dahil sa 'yo!	June 9	
Kung Kasalanan Man	June 21	
Aso't Pusa	July 6	
Abot Hanggang Sukdalan	July 9	
Hindi Pahuhuli ng Buhay	August 9	
Estudyante Blues	August 30	
Dear Diary	September 6	
Babangon Ako't Dudurugin Kita	September 13	
Ang Babaeng Nawawala sa Sarili	October 4	
Wooly Booly: Ang Classmate Kong Alien	October 19	
Isang Bala, Isang Buhay	November 9	
Oras-Oras, Araw-Araw	November 22	
Imortal	December 25	

== 1990s ==
- Tootsie Wootsie: Ang Bandang Walang Altrasan (1990)
- Pangarap na Ginto (1990)
- Kahit Konting Pagtingin (1990)
- Sa Diyos Lang Ako Susuko (1990)
- Kapag Wala Nang Batas (1990)
- Hulihin Si... Boy Amores (1990)
- Kakampi Ko ang Diyos (1990)
- Gumapang Ka Sa Lusak (1990)
- Paikot-Ikot (1990)
- Sgt. Miguel Carpio: Multiple Murder (1990)
- Jabidah Massacre (1990)
- Titser's Enemi No. 1 (1990)
- Kasalanan Bang Sambahin Ka? (1990)
- Bikining Itim (1990)
- Kolehiyala (1990)
- Rocky n Rolly: Suntok Sabay Takbo (1990)
- Walang Awa Kung Pumatay (1990)
- Hulihin Si... Nardong Toothpick (1990)
- Lumaban Ka, Sagot Kita (1990)
- Bad Boy (1990)
- Bakit Kay Tagal ng Sandali? (1990)
- Anak ni Baby Ama (1990)
- Bakit Ikaw Pa Rin? (1990)
- Love at First Sight (1990)
- Wooly Booly II: Ang Titser Kong Alien (1990)
- Biktima (1990)
- Ang Utol Kong Hoodlum (1991)
- Maging Sino Ka Man (1991)
- Humanap Ka ng Panget (1991)
- Sa Kabila ng Lahat (1991)
- Hinakay Ko Na ang Libigan Mo (1991)
- Boyong Mañalac: Hoodlum Terminator (1991)
- Andrew Ford Medina: Wag Kang Gamol (1991)
- Noel Juico: Batang Kriminal (1991)
- Ipagpatawad Mo (1991)
- Robin Good: Sugod ng Sugod (1991)
- Huwag Mong Salingin ang Sugat Ko (1991)
- Kaputol ng Isang Awit (1991)
- Kumukulong Dugo (1991)
- Angelito San Miguel: Ang Batang City Jail (1991)
- Darna (1991)
- Moro (1991)
- Una Kang Naging Akin (1991)
- Pitong Gamol (1991)
- Miss na Miss Kita: Ang Utol Kong Hoodlum II (1992)
- Pat Omar Abdullah: Pulis Probinsya (1992; distribution only, produced by Moviestars Productions)
- Akin ang Pangarap Mo (1992)
- Pangako sa 'Yo (1992)
- Magnong Rehas (1992)
- Alabang Girls (1992)
- Mandurugas (1992)
- Tayong Dalawa (1992)
- Hiram na Mukha (1992)
- Tag-Araw, Tag-Ulan (1992)
- Mahirap Maging Pogi (1992)
- Jesus Dela Cruz at ang Mga Batang Riles (1992)
- Andres Manambit: Angkan ng Matatapang (1992)
- Narito ang Puso Ko (1992)
- Grease Gun Gang (1992)
- Apoy sa Puso (1992)
- Ngayon at Kailanman (1992)
- Bad Boy II (1992)
- Pacifico Guevara: Dillinger ng Dose Pares (1992)
- Ang Boyfriend Kong Gamol (1993)
- Pretty Boy (1993)
- Sana'y Ikaw Na Nga (1993)
- Makuha Ka sa Tingin (1993)
- Pita: Terror ng Caloocan (1993)
- Kapag Iginuhit ang Hatol ng Puso (1993)
- Gagay: Prinsesa ng Brownout (1993)
- Hanggang Saan Hanggang Kailan (1993)
- Kung Kailangan Mo Ako (1993)
- Anak ng Pasig (1993)
- Markadong Hudas (1993)
- Kahit Ako'y Busabos (1993)
- Row 4: Baliktorians (1993)
- Ikaw (1993)
- Sala sa Init, Sala sa Lamig (1993)
- Paranaque Bank Robbery: The Joselito Joseco Story (1993)
- Dodong Armado (1993)
- Astig (1993)
- Manchichiritchit: Aanga-Anga sa Maynila (1993)
- Di na Natuto (Sorry Na, Puede Ba?) (1993)
- Sa Isang Sulok ng Mga Pangarap (1993)
- Pusoy Dos (1993)
- Mistah (1994)
- Hindi Pa Tapos ang Laban (1994)
- Kapantay Ay Langit (1994)
- Pinagbiyak ng Bunga: Lookalayk (1994)
- Ultimatum (1994)
- Baby Paterno (Dugong Pulis) (1994)
- The Cecilla Masagca Story: Antipolo Massacre (Jesus Save Us!) (1994)
- Kadenang Bulaklak (1994)
- Pangako ng Kahapon (1994)
- Da Young Asyong Aksaya (1994)
- Ikaw ang Miss Universe ng Buhay Ko (1994)
- Bratpack: Pambayad Atraso (1994)
- Mars Ravelo's Darna! Ang Pagbabalik (1994)
- The Untold Story: Vizconde Massacre II - May the Lord Be with Us! (1994)
- Ober Da Bakod: The Movie (1994), co-produced with GMA Pictures
- The Maggie dela Riva Story: God... Why Me? (1994)
- Kalabog en Bosyo (1994)
- Cuadro de Jack (1994)
- Sana Dalawa ang Puso Ko (1994) co-produced with GMA Pictures
- Megamol (1994)
- Pintsik (1994)
- Oo Na, Sige Na (1994)
- Col. Billy Bibit, RAM (1994)
- Forever (1994) co-produced with GMA Pictures
- Marami Ka Pang Kakaining Bigas (1994)
- Lipa 'Arandia' Massacre: Lord, Deliver Us from Evil (1994)
- Talahib at Rosas (1994)
- Anghel Na Walang Langit (1994)
- Epimaco Velasco: NBI (co-production with FLT Films & FPJ Productions, 1994)
- Ang Pagbabalik ni Pedro Penduko (1994)
- Lucas Abelardo (1994; co-production with Levin Films)
- Anabelle Huggins Story: Ruben Ablaza Tragedy - Mea Culpa (1995)
- Campus Girls (1995)
- The Lilian Velez Story: Till Death Do Us Part (1995)
- Ang Tipo Kong Lalake (1995)
- P're Hanggang Sa Huli (1995)
- Love Notes (1995)
- Bikini Watch (1995)
- Silakbo (1995)
- Epifanio ang Bilas Ko (1995)
- Iligpit si Bobby Ortega, Markang Bungo 2 (1995)
- Batangueno Kabitenyo (1995)
- I Love You Sabado (1995)
- Minsan May Pangarap (1995)
- Bangers (1995)
- The Flor Contemplacion Story (1995)
- Jessica Alfaro Story (1995)
- The Grepor Butch Belgica Story (1995)
- Urban Rangers (1995)
- Dobol Trobol (1995; released under the Falcon Films label)
- Okey si Ma'am (1995)
- Rodolfo 'Boy' Fuentes: Libingan ng Mga Buhay (1995)
- Batas Ko ang Katapat Mo (1995)
- Judge Max Asuncion: Hukom Bitay (1995)
- Minsan Pa: Kahit Konting Pagtingin Part 2 (1995)
- Indecent Professor (1995; released under the Falcon Films label)
- Manalo, Matalo, Mahal Kita (1995; released under the Neo Films label)
- Huwag Mong Isuko Ang Laban (1995; distribution only, produced by Rockets Productions)
- Sabado Nights (1995; released under the Neo Films label)
- Muling Umawit ang Puso (1995)
- Dyesebel (1996)
- Ober Da Bakod 2: Da Treasure Adbentyur (1996 released under the Neo Films label), co-produced with GMA Pictures
- Sa Kamay ng Batas (1996)
- Tong-its (1996; released under the Neo Films label)
- Ang Pinakamagandang Hayop sa Balat ng Lupa (1996)
- Hindi Lahat ng Ahas ay Nasa Gubat (1996)
- Madaling Mamatay, Mahirap Mabuhay (1996; released under the Neo Films label)
- Habang May Buhay (1996)
- Tong-Its (1996; released under the Neo Films label)
- April Boys: Sana'y Mahalin Mo Rin Ako (1996)
- Cara Y Cruz: Walang Sinasanto (1996)
- SPO4 Santiago: Sharpshooter (1996)
- Takot Ka Ba sa Dilim (1996) co-produced with GMA Pictures
- Bilang Na ang Araw Mo (1996; released under the Neo Films label)
- Hindi Ako Ander (1996; released under the Neo Films label)
- SPO1 Don Juan (Da Dancing Policeman) (1996; released under the Neo Films label)
- Mahal Kita, Alam Mo Ba? (1996; released under the Neo Films label)
- Do Re Mi (1996; released under the Neo Films label)
- Papunta Ka Pa Lang, Pabalik Na Ako (1996)
- Where 'D' Girls 'R' (1996)
- Mumbaki (1996; released under the Neo Films label)
- Ikaw Naman ang Iiyak (1996)
- Segurista (1996; released under the Neo Films label)
- Bakit May Kahapon Pa? (1996)
- Paracale Gang (1996; released under the Falcon Films label)
- Ober Da Bakod 2 (1996; released under the Neo Films label), co-produced with GMA Pictures
- Neber 2-Geder (1996)
- Ang Misis Kong Hoodlum (1996; released under the Neo Films label)
- Maruja (1996)
- Wanted: Perfect Mother (1996; released under the Neo Films label)
- Ang Probinsyano (1996; co-production with FPJ Productions)
- Nag-iisang Ikaw (1996; released under the Neo Films label)
- Papunta Ka Pa Lang, Pabalik Na Ako (1996)
- TGIS: The Movie (1997) co-produced with GMA Pictures
- Bridesmaids (1997)
- Dahil Tanging Ikaw (1997)
- Magkapalad (1997; released under the Falcon Films label)
- Nang Iniwan Mo Ako (1997)
- Trabaho Lang Dear, Walang Personalan (1997; released under the Neo Films label)
- Lihim ni Madonna (1997)
- Anak ni Boy Negro (1997; released under the Neo Films label)
- Laging Naroon Ka (1997)
- Habang Nasasaktan, Lalong Tumatapang (1997)
- The Onyok Velasco Story (1997)
- Hanggang Ngayon Ika'y Minamahal (1997; released under the Neo Films label)
- Boy Buluran (1997; released under the Neo Films label)
- Mauna Ka, Susunod Ako (1997)
- Strict ang Parents Ko (1997; released under the Neo Films label)
- Hanggang Dito Na Lang (1997)
- Takot Ako sa Darling Ko (1997; released under the Neo Films label)
- Gloria, Gloria Labandera (1997)
- Matinik na Bading, Mga Syokeng Buking (1997; released under the Neo Films label)
- Pablik Enemi 1 n 2: Aksidental Heroes (1997)
- Eseng ng Tondo (1997; co-production with FPJ Productions)
- Isinakdal Ko ang Aking Ina (1997)
- Hawak Ko Buhay Mo (1997; released under the Neo Films label)
- Duplikado (1997)
- Kool Ka Lang (1997; released under the Falcon Films label)
- Wala Nang Iibigin Pang Iba (1997; released under the Neo Films label)
- Roberta (1997)
- Pipti-pipti: 1 Por U, 2 Por Me (1997; released under the Neo Films label)
- Si Mokong, si Astig, at si Gamol (1997)
- Isang Tanong, Isang Sagot (1997; released under the Neo Films label)
- Pag-Ibig Ko Sa Iyo'y Totoo (1997)
- The Sarah Balabagan Story (1997)
- Wala Na Bang Pag-ibig (1997)
- Honey, Nasa Langit na Ba Ako? (1997; released under the Neo Films label)
- Takot Ako sa Darling Ko (1997; released under the Neo Films label)
- Buhay Mo'y Buhay Ko Rin (1997; released under the Neo Films label)
- Matinik Na Bading, Mga Syukang Buking (1997; released under the Neo Films label)
- Extranghero (1997)
- Magic Kingdom: Ang Alamat ng Damortis (1997; released under the Neo Films label)
- Ikaw na Sana (1998; released under the Neo Films label)
- Pagbabalik ng Probinsyano (1998; co-production with FPJ Productions)
- Strebel: Gestapo ng Maynila (1998)
- Silaw (1998)
- Sabong (1998; released under the Falcon Films label)
- Ben Delubyo (1998; released under the Neo Films label)
- Ama Namin (1998; distribution only, produced by Premiere Productions)
- It's Cool Bulol (1998; released under the Neo Films label)
- Pusong Mamon (1998; released under the Neo Films label)
- Balasubas (1998; released under the Neo Films label)
- Wangbu (1998; released under the Neo Films label)
- Dahil Ba sa Kanya (1998)
- Dr. X on the Air (1998; released under the Falcon Films label)
- Tatsulok (1998)
- Kasangga Kahit Kailan (1998; released under the Neo Films label)
- Ang Lahat ng Ito'y Para Sa'yo (1998)
- Squala (1998; released under the Neo Films label)
- Cariño Brutal (1998)
- Dama de Noche (1998; released under the Neo Films label)
- I'm Sorry, My Love (1998)
- Gangland (1998; released under the Neo Films label)
- Tulak ng Bibig, Kabig ng Dibdib (1998; co-production with FLT Films International)
- Pagnanasa (1998; released under the Neo Films label)
- Ginto't Pilak (1998)
- Warfreak (1998; released under the Neo Films label)
- Ang Erpat Kong Astig (1998)
- Sumigaw Ka Hanggang Gusto Mo (1999)
- Bayad Puri (1999)
- Scorpio Nights 2 (1999; released under the Neo Films label)
- My Pledge of Love (1999)
- Katawan (1999; released under the Neo Films label)
- Honey, My Love, So Sweet (1999)
- Ang Kabit ni Mrs. Montero (1999)
- Ms. Kristina Moran: Babaeng Palaban (1999)
- Dahil May Isang Ikaw (1999)
- Basta Ikaw... Nanginginig Pa! (1999; co-production with M-ZET Productions)
- Warat (1999)
- Bullet (1999)
- Ekis: Walang Tatakas (1999)
- Ikaw Lamang (1999)
- Bilib Ako Sa 'Yo (1999)
- Unfaithful Wife 2: Sana'y Huwag Akong Maligaw (1999; co-production with Serafim Productions)
- Asin at Paminta (1999)
- Kiss Mo Ko (1999)
- Dito sa Puso Ko (1999)
- Linlang (1999)
- Bulaklak ng Maynila (1999)

== 2000s ==
- Matalino Man ang Matsing, Naiisahan Din (2000)
- Pag Oras Mo, Oras Mo Na (2000)
- Mana Mana, Tiba Tiba (2000)
- Pedro Penduko: Episode II – Return of the Comeback (2000)
- Bukas Na Lang Kita Mamahalin (2000)
- Ika-13 Kapitulo (2000)
- Kailangan Ko'y Ikaw (2000)
- Biyaheng Langit (2000)
- Gusto Ko Nang Lumigaya (2000)
- Abandonada (2000)
- Juan & Ted: Wanted (2000)
- Sugo ng Tondo (2000)
- Balahibong Pusa (2001)
- Booba (2001)
- Tusong Twosome (2001)
- Sa Huling Paghihintay (2001)
- Abakada... Ina (2001)
- Baliktaran: Si Ace at si Daisy (2001)
- Alas Dose (2001)
- Buhay Kamao (2001)
- Pangako, Ikaw Lang (2001)
- Radyo (2001)
- Banyo Queen (2001)
- Sanggano't Sanggago (2001)
- Dos Ekis (2001)
- Weyt a Minit Kapeng Mainit (2001)
- Pagdating ng Panahon (2001)
- Tatarin (2001)
- Mahal Kita, Final Answer (2002)
- Ikaw Lamang, Hanggang Ngayon (2002)
- Hari ng Selda: Anak ni Baby Ama 2 (2002)
- S2Pid Luv (2002)
- Akala Mo (2002)
- Magkapatid (2002)
- Super B (2002; released under the Neo Films label)
- D' Uragons (2002)
- Gamitan (2002)
- Jeannie, Bakit Ngayon Ka Lang? (2002)
- Hibla (2002)
- Shark Attack 3 (2003); released by Nu Image Films & Star Cinema
- Sukdulan (2003)
- A.B. Normal College (2003)
- Lupe: A Seaman's Wife (2003)
- Sex Drive (2003)
- Walang Kapalit (2003)
- Ang Huling Birhen sa Lupa (2003; released under the Neo Films label)
- Pangarap Ko ang Ibigin Ka (2003)
- Masamang Ugat (2003)
- Keka (2003)
- First Time (2003)
- Bugbog Sarado (2003)
- Captain Barbell (2003; co-production with Premiere Entertainment Productions)
- Filipinas (2003)
- Annie B.: Bida ng Ukay-Ukay, Bongga s'ya Day! (2004)
- Masikip sa Dibdib: The Boobita Rose Story (2004)
- Kulimlim (2004)
- Lastikman: Unang Banat (2004)
- Boso (2005; co-production with Pelipula, released under the Viva Digital label)
- Tuli (2005; released under the Viva Digital label)
- Ilusyon (2005; co-production with Pelipula, released under the Viva Digital label)
- Kaleldo (2006; distribution only, produced by Centerstage Productions)
- Co-Ed Scandal (2006; released under the Viva Digital label)
- Till I Met You (2006; co-production with GMA Pictures)
- Wag Kang Lilingon (2006; co-production with Star Cinema & ABS-CBN Films)
- Reyna: Ang Makulay na Pakikipagsapalaran ng Mga Achucherva, Achuchuva, Achechenes... (2006)
- Siquijor: Mystic Island (2007; distribution only, produced by Centerstage Productions)
- Ang Cute Ng Ina Mo (2007; co-production with Star Cinema & ABS-CBN Films)
- Paano Kita Iibigin (2007; co-production with Star Cinema & ABS-CBN Films)
- Ouija (2007; co-production with GMA Pictures)
- Apat Dapat, Dapat Apat: Friends 4 Lyf and Death (2007)
- When Love Begins (co-production With Star Cinema & ABS-CBN Films, 2008)
- Ikaw Pa Rin, Bongga Ka Boy! (2008)
- A Very Special Love (2008; co-production with Star Cinema & ABS-CBN Films)
- Torotot (2008; co-production with Production 56)
- Baler (2008; co-production with BIDA); distributed by GMA Pictures
- Status: Single (2009)
- You Changed My Life (2009; co-production with Star Cinema & ABS-CBN Films)
- Little Boy Big Boy (2009; co-production with Beyond the Box)
- Patient X (2009; co-production with GMA Pictures)

== 2010s ==
=== 2010 ===
Film	Release	Genre	Notes
Babe, I Love You	April 3	Romantic comedy	co-production with Star Cinema
Working Girls	April 21	Comedy	co-production with GMA Pictures and Unitel Pictures
Emir	June 9	Drama, musical	distribution only
Hating Kapatid	July 21	Comedy drama	
In Your Eyes	August 18	Romance, drama	co-production with GMA Pictures
Petrang Kabayo	October 13	Comedy, fantasy	remake of Petrang Kabayo at Ang Pilyang Kuting (1988)

=== 2011 ===
Film	Release	Genre	Notes
Who's That Girl?	March 2	Romantic comedy	
Catch Me, I'm in Love	March 23	Romantic comedy	co-production with Star Cinema
Tumbok	May 4	Horror, thriller	
No Other Woman	September 28	Drama, Romance, thriller	co-production with Star Cinema
Praybeyt Benjamin	October 26	Comedy, Action	co-production with Star Cinema
Won't Last A Day Without You	November 30	Romantic comedy	co-production with Star Cinema
Manila Kingpin: The Asiong Salonga Story	December 25	Crime, biopic	distribution only; produced by Scenema Concept International official entry to the 37th Metro Manila Film Festival

=== 2012 ===
Film	Release	Genre	Notes
Hitman	February 22	Action	co-production with CM Films; Distributed by GMA Pictures
Moron 5 and the Crying Lady	April 7	Comedy	co-production with MVP Productions
Of All the Things	September 26	Romance, drama	co-production with GMA Pictures
This Guy's in Love with U Mare!	October 10	Comedy, Romance	co-production with Star Cinema
A Secret Affair	October 24	Romance, drama	
Rigodon	November 21	Drama, erotic	co-production with Reality Entertainment; Distributed by GMA Pictures
El Presidente	December 25	Biopic	distribution only; produced by Scenema Concept International official entry to the 38th Metro Manila Film Festival
Sisterakas	December 25	Comedy, parody film, drama	co-production with Star Cinema official entry to the 38th Metro Manila Film Festival

=== 2013 ===
Film	Release	Genre	Notes
Menor de Edad	January 23	Drama	
The Fighting Chefs	March 6	Action, romantic comedy	co-production with Rocketts Productions and MVP Productions
It Takes a Man and a Woman	March 30	Romantic comedy	co-production with Star Cinema
Coming Soon	April 17	Comedy	distribution only, produced by Fearless Productions
Ang Huling Henya	August 21	Action, sci-fi	co-production with MVP Productions
Momzillas	September 18	Comedy	co-production with Star Cinema
Bekikang: Ang Nanay Kong Beki	October 23	Comedy	co-production with MVP Productions
When the Love Is Gone	November 27	Romance, drama	co-production with MVP Productions
Boy Golden: Shoot to Kill	December 25	Action	co-production with Scenema Concept International official entry to the 39th Metro Manila Film Festival
Girl, Boy, Bakla, Tomboy	December 25	Comedy, drama	co-production with Star Cinema an official entry to the 39th Metro Manila Film Festival
10,000 Hours	December 25	Action, thriller	co-production with N² an official entry to the 39th Metro Manila Film Festival

=== 2014 ===
Film	Release	Genre	Notes
ABNKKBSNPLAko: The Movie	February 19	Comedy	co-production with MVP Productions
Diary ng Panget	April 2	Teen romance	
Maybe This Time	May 28	Romantic comedy	co-production with Star Cinema
Trophy Wife	July 30	Drama, romance, thriller	
Talk Back and You're Dead	August 20	Romantic comedy	co-production with Skylight Films
The Gifted	September 3	Romantic comedy	co-production with MVP Productions
Moron 5.2: The Transformation	November 5	Comedy, action	
Muslim Magnum .357: To Serve and Protect	December 25	Action	co-production with Scenema Concept International official entry to the 40th Metro Manila Film Festival
The Amazing Praybeyt Benjamin	December 25	Comedy, action	co-production with Star Cinema an official entry to the 40th Metro Manila Film Festival

=== 2015 ===
Film	Release	Genre	Notes
Tragic Theater	January 8	Horror, thriller	
Your Place or Mine?	April 29		
Para sa Hopeless Romantic	May 13	Romance, comedy	co-production with Star Cinema
Binhi: The Seed	May 20		co-production with Haunted Tower Pictures
Waves	June 24		co-production with Waverly Pictures
The Breakup Playlist	July 1	Romance	co-production with Star Cinema
Chain Mail	July 22	Mystery, horror film	
Ex with Benefits	September 2	Romance, drama	co-production with Star Cinema and Skylight Films
Felix Manalo	October 7	Biography, Historical, drama	
Maria Labo	November 11		co-production with KIB Productions and Star Builders Talent Agency & Film Production
Wang Fam	November 18	Horror, comedy	
Angela Markado	December 2		co-production with Oro de Siete Productions
Manila's Finest	December 9	Action	co-production with Prince Armor Productions
Beauty and the Bestie	December 25	Comedy, action	co-production with Star Cinema an official entry to the 41st Metro Manila Film Festival highest-grossing film of the year with an estimated amount of ₱526 million
Nilalang	December 25	Horror, action	co-production with Haunted Tower Pictures, WeLovePost and Parallax Studios an official entry to the 41st Metro Manila Film Festival

=== 2016 ===
Film	Release	Genre	Notes
Lumayo Ka Nga Sa Akin	January 13	Satire, comedy film, parody, action, horror, romance, drama	co-production with Heaven's Best Entertainment
Girlfriend for Hire	February 10		
Elemento	April 6		co-production with Thriverion Media Production
This Time	May 4	Romance, comedy-romance film	
Teniente Gimo	June 1		co-production with KIB Productions and RMS Productions
Pare Mahal Mo Raw Ako	June 8		co-production with Scenema Concept International
Camp Sawi	August 24	Comedy	co-production with N²
Bakit Lahat ng Gwapo may Boyfriend?	October 19	Comedy, comedy-drama	co-production with The IdeaFirst Company
Working Beks	November 23	Comedy, drama	

=== 2017 ===
Film	Release	Genre	Notes
Mang Kepweng Returns	January 4	fantasy comedy horror film, action	co-production with Cineko Productions
Darkroom	January 18		co-production with Blackops Studios Asia and Psyops Asia
Swipe	February 1		co-production with Aliud Entertainment and Ledge Films
Luck at First Sight	May 3		co-production with N²
Ang Pagsanib kay Leah Dela Cruz	June 28		co-production with Reality Entertainment
Kita Kita	July 19	Romance, comedy, drama	co-production with Spring Films
Finally Found Someone	July 26		co-production with Star Cinema
Double Barrel	August 9		
100 Tula Para Kay Stella	August 16		an official entry to the Pista ng Pelikulang Pilipino
FanGirl FanBoy	September 6	Romance, Teen	co-production with N²
Amalanhig: The Vampire Chronicle	September 20		co-production with Vic Val Blue Sapphire Productions
The Barker	October 25		co-production with Blank Pages Productions
#12	November 8		
Kamandag ng Droga	December 6		
Ang Panday	December 25	Action, Superhero, fantasy, adventure	co-production with CCM Film Productions and Star Cinema an official entry to the 43rd Metro Manila Film Festival
Gandarrapiddo: The Revenger Squad	December 25	Comedy, Superhero, action	co-production with Star Cinema an official entry to the 43rd Metro Manila Film Festival highest-grossing film of the year with an estimated amount of ₱571 million

=== 2018 ===
Film	Release	Notes
Mr. And Mrs. Cruz	January 24	co-production with The IdeaFirst Company
Meet Me in St. Gallen	February 7	co-production with Spring Films
Amnesia Love	February 28	
Ang Pambansang Third Wheel	March 7	co-production with The IdeaFirst Company
Never Not Love You	March 31	co-production with Project 8 Corner San Joaquin Projects
Squad Goals #FBois	May 9	
Sid & Aya: Not a Love Story	May 30	co-production with N²
Cry No Fear	June 20	
The Write Moment	June 27	distribution only, produced by The IdeaFirst Company and QCinema
The Maid in London	July 4	
Jacqueline Comes Home: The Chiong Story	July 18	
BuyBust	August 1	co-production with Reality Entertainment
The Day After Valentine's	August 15	an official entry to the Pista ng Pelikulang Pilipino
Miss Granny	August 22	co-production with CJ Entertainment and N² Productions remake of the 2014 movie of the same title
Wander Bra	September 12	co-production with Bluerock Entertainment
Abay Babes	September 19	
The Trigonal	September 26	co-production with Cinefenio Films, RSVP Film Studios, and Piaya Network co-distribution with Cinefenio Film Studios and Axinite Digicinema
Para sa Broken Hearted	October 3	co-production with Sari Sari
First Love	October 17	co-production with Ten17P and Star Cinema co-distribution with Star Cinema
All Souls Night	October 31	co-production with Aliud Entertainment and ImaginePerSecond
Through Night and Day	November 14	co-production with OctoArts Films and Misschief Production
Kahit Ayaw Mo Na	December 5	co-production with BluArt
Aurora	December 25	co-production with Aliud Entertainment an official entry to the 44th Metro Manila Film Festival
Fantastica	December 25	co-production with Star Cinema an official entry to the 44th Metro Manila Film Festival

=== 2019 ===
Film	Release	Notes
Hanggang Kailan?	February 6	co-production with BluArt Productions
Exit Point	February 20	co-production with Rockets Productions
Ulan	March 13	co-production with N²
Maria	March 27	co-production with BlackOps Studios Asia and Psyops8
S.O.N.S.: Sons of Nanay Sabel	May 8	
Indak	August 7	
Just a Stranger	August 21	
Sanggano, Sanggago't Sanggwapo	September 4	
Watch Me Kill	September 13	distribution only; produced by CineBandits Entertainment and Greenlight
Jowable	September 25	co-production with VinCentiments
Edward	October 2	distribution only, produced by Outpost Visual Frontier an official entry to the 15th Cinemalaya Independent Film Festival
Pandanggo sa Hukay	October 9	distribution only, produced by Grand Larain Productions, Monoxide Works, Outpost, and Purple Pig an official entry to the 15th Cinemalaya Independent Film Festival
Unforgettable	October 23	co-production with The IdeaFirst Company
Nuuk	November 6	co-production with OctoArts Films and Mavx Productions
Two Love You	November 13	distribution only, produced by OgieD Productions Inc., Lonewolf Films, and CMB Film Services
Adan	November 20	co-production with Alliud Entertainment
Mañanita	December 4	co-production with Ten17P
My Bakit List	December 11	co-production with BluArt Productions
The Mall, The Merrier	December 25	co-production with Star Cinema an official entry to the 45th Metro Manila Film Festival
Miracle in Cell No.7	December 25	an official entry to the 45th Metro Manila Film Festival remake of the 2013 movie of the same title

== 2020s ==
=== 2020 ===
Film	Release	Notes
MIA	January 15	co-production with Insight 360 Films
Nightshift	January 22	co-production with Alliud Entertainment
On Vodka, Beers, and Regrets	February 5	
UnTrue	February 19	co-production with The IdeaFirst Company
Hindi Tayo Pwede	March 4	
Love the Way U Lie	August 20	released as a Netflix film
Alter Me	November 15	co-production with TEN17P and released as a Netflix film
Pakboys: Takusa	December 25	an official entry to the 46th Metro Manila Film Festival
Suarez: The Healing Priest	December 25	distribution only, produced by Saranggola Media Productions official entry to the 46th Metro Manila Film Festival

=== 2021 ===
Film	Release	Genre	Notes
Steal	January 22		co-production with BluArt Productions
Paglaki Ko, Gusto Kong Maging Pornstar	January 29		co-production with VinCentiments
Sana All	February 5		co-production with BluArt Productions
Tililing	March 5		
Death of a Girlfriend	April 30		
Kaka	May 28	Erotic, comedy film	
Ang Babaeng Walang Pakiramdam	June 11	Comedy	co-production with VinCentiments
Gluta	July 2		co-production with VinCentiments
Silab	July 9		
The Other Wife	July 16		
Nerisa	July 30		
Revirginized	August 6		co-production with VinCentiments
Ikaw, Ako at ang Ending	August 13		
Taya	August 27		
69+1	September 3		
The Housemaid	September 10		
Bekis on the Run	September 17		
Paraluman	September 24		
Ang Manananggal na Nahahati ang Puso	October 1		
Shoot! Shoot! Di Ko Siya Titigilan	October 8		
Sarap Mong Patayin	October 15		co-production with VinCentiments
House Tour	October 22		
Sa Haba Ng Gabi	October 29		
Barumbadings	November 5		
Mahjong Nights	November 12		
Mang Jose	November 24		
More than Blue	November 19		Remake of the 2009 movie of the same title
My Husband, My Lover	November 26		
Pornstar 2: Pangalawang Putok	December 3		co-production with VinCentiments
Dulo	December 10		
Palitan	December 10		
Crush Kong Curly	December 17		
Eva	December 24		
A Hard Day	December 25		official entry to the 47th Metro Manila Film Festival remake of the 2014 movie of the same title
The Exorsis	December 25		co-production with TINCAN official entry to the 2021 Metro Manila Film Festival
Sanggano, Sanggago't Sanggwapo: Aussie! Aussie (O Sige)	December 31	Comedy	

=== 2022 ===
Film	Release	Notes
Siklo	January 7	
Hugas (Wash)	January 14	
Sisid (Dive)	January 19	
Reroute	January 21	
Yorme: The Isko Domagoso Story	January 21	distribution only, produced by Saranggola Media Productions
Deception	January 28	
Eyes on Fire	January 28	Original title: Silip sa Apoy
Kinsenas Katapusan	February 4	
The Wife	February 11	
Boy Bastos (Rude Boy)	February 18	
Bahay na Pula (Red House)	February 25	
The Last Five Years	March 4	
Adarna Gang	March 11	
Moonlight Butterfly	March 18	
X-Deal 2	March 25	
Island of Desire	April 1	
Greed	April 8	
366	April 15	
Habangbuhay (For a Lifetime)	April 22	
Rooftop	April 27	
Kaliwaan (Left)	April 29	
Doblado (Doubled)	May 6	
Putahe (Dish)	May 13	
Ikaw Lang ang Mahal (It's Only You That I Love)	May 20	
Pusoy	May 27	
Breathe Again	June 3	
Pa-Thirsty	June 3	
Secrets	June 10	
How to Love Mr. Heartless	June 17	
Virgin Forest	June 24	
Biyak	July 1	
Kitty K7	July 8	
Ang Babaeng Nawawala sa Sarili (The Woman Who Lost Herself)	July 15	remake of the 1989 film of the same title
Tahan	July 22	
Scorpio Nights 3	July 29	
Maid in Malacañang	August 3	co-production with VinCentiments
Purificacion	August 5	
The Influencer	August 12	
Lampas Langit	August 19	
Sitio Diablo (Devil City)	August 26	
Bula	September 2	
#DoYouThinkIAmSEXY?	September 9	
Expensive Candy	September 14	
5 in 1	September 23	
Always	September 28	remake of the 2011 movie of the same title
Girl Friday	September 30	
Pabuya	October 7	
Relyebo	October 14	
Tubero	October 21	
Selena's Bold	October 28	
Kara Krus	November 4	
Showroom	November 11	
Mahal Kita, Beksman	November 16	co-production with The IdeaFirst Company and Powerhouse MC
Alapaap	November 18	
Us x Her	November 25	
Bata Pa Si Sabel (Sabel Is Still Young)	December 2	remake of the 1981 film of the same title
Pamasahe	December 9	
Laruan	December 16	
An Affair to Forget	December 23	
Deleter	December 25	official entry to the 48th Metro Manila Film Festival
Partners in Crime	December 25	co-production with Star Cinema official entry to the 48th Metro Manila Film Festival
Mamasapano: Now It Can Be Told	December 25	distribution only; produced by Boraccho Film Productions; official entry to the 48th Metro Manila Film Festival

=== 2023 ===
Film	Release	Notes
Panibugho	January 6	
Nightbird	January 13	
Girlfriend na Pwede na	January 18	co-production with Lonewolf Films
Tag-init	January 20	
Hello, Universe	January 25	
SpellBound	February 1	co-production with CJ ENM remake of the 2011 movie of the same title
Bakit Hindi Mo Ako Sasabihin?	February 22	distribution only, produced by Firestarters Studios an official entry to the 18th Cinemalaya Independent Film Festival
Martyr or Murderer	March 1	co-production with VinCentiments
Kunwari Mahal na Mahal na Mahal Kita	March 15	co-production with Next Scene
Baby Boy, Baby Girl	March 22	co- production with Ninuno Media
Walang KaParis	March 23	distributed through Amazon Prime Video, co-production with Spring Films
Working Boys 2: Choose Your Papa	March 29	
Yung Libro sa Napanood Ko	April 8	official entry to the 1st Summer Metro Manila Film Festival
Adik Sa Yo	April 19	co-production with VinCentiments Entertainment
Sa Muli	April 26	co-production with The Fifth Studio
Beks Days of Our Lives	May 17	
Will You Be My Ex?	June 21	
Tayuan	June 23	
Home Service	July 14	co-production with 3:16 Media Network; distributed through VivaMax
Mary Cherry Chua	July 19	co-production with Studio Viva
The Ship Show	August 9	
Wish You Were the One	August 23	co-production with Clever Minds Inc. and Manila Envelope
Kidnap for Romance	September 6	
What If	September 7	distributed by Netflix
Video City: Be Kind, Please Rewind	September 20	co-production with GMA Pictures and Studio Viva
Instant Daddy	October 11, 2023	co-production with Globalgate Entertainment
Marita	November 22, 2023	co-production with Studio Viva
In His Mother's Eyes	November 29, 2023	distribution only; co-production with 7K Entertainment
Ikaw at Ako	December 6, 2023	co-production with Mavx Productions inc.
Para Kang Papa Mo	December 13, 2023	co-production with VinCentiments Entertainment
Penduko	December 25, 2023	co-production with Sari-Sari Films and Studio Viva; Official entry of 49th Metro Manila Film Festival

=== 2024 ===
Film	Release	Notes
My Zombabe	January 10, 2024	co-production with VinCentiments and Studio Viva
Road Trip	January 17, 2024	
Itutumba Ka ng Tatay Ko	January 24, 2024	
My Sassy Girl	January 31, 2024	co-production with TinCan and Fifth Studio
Ikaw Pa Rin ang Pipiliin ko	February 7, 2024	
A Glimpse of Forever	March 6, 2024	
3 Days 2 Nights in Poblacion	March 13, 2024	
Pagpag 24/7	March 20, 2024	
Dearly Beloved	March 30, 2024	
Sunny	April 10, 2024	co-production with Studio Viva
Elevator	April 24, 2024	co-production with Studio Viva, CineKo Productions, and Rein Entertainment
Men Are From QC, Women Are From Alabang	May 1, 2024	co-production with MQuest Ventures, Epik Studios and Studio Viva
Isang Gabi	May 15, 2024	
Seoulmeyt	May 29, 2024	co-production with VinCentiments and Film Line
1521	June 5, 2024	distribution only; produced by Inspire Studios
Playtime	June 12, 2024	co-production with GMA Pictures
Karma	June 19, 2024	co-production with Happy Infinite Productions and Mobius Films
Kuman Thong	July 3, 2024	co-production with Studio Viva
How to Slay a Nepo Baby	July 31, 2024	
Unang Tikim	August 7, 2024	Under Vivamax Originals; co-production with Pelikula Independent
Un/Happy for You	August 14, 2024	co-production with Star Cinema and ABS-CBN Studios
Real Life Fiction	August 28, 2024	co-production with Spring Films; distributed by Black Cap Pictures
40	September 4, 2024	co-production with Happy Infinite
Nanay Tatay	October 9, 2024	co-production with Studio Viva and Happy Infinite
Nokturno	October 31, 2024	distribution only with Amazon MGM Studios via Amazon Prime Video label, Produced by Evolve Studios and Studio Viva
Hold Me Close	December 25, 2024	

=== 2025 ===
Film	Release	Notes
Sampung Utos Kay Josh	January 29, 2025	
Mananambal	February 19, 2025	distribution only; produced by BC Entertainment Production
In Thy Name	March 5, 2025	distribution only; produced by GreatCzar Media Production
Lilim	March 12, 2025	co-production with Studio Viva and Evolve Studios
Un-Ex You	April 9, 2025	distribution only; produced by Studio Viva
Isolated	April 30, 2025	
In Between	May 7, 2025	
Wild Boys	August 13, 2025	distribution only; produced by Bright Ideas
Ang Aking Mga Anak	September 3, 2025	distribution only; produced by DreamGo Productions
Minamahal	September 24, 2025	co-production with Studio Viva
Out of Order	October 2, 2025	co-production with Studio Viva and Myriad Entertainment
Call Me Mother	December 25, 2025	co-production with Star Cinema, ABS-CBN Studios and The IdeaFirst Company official entry to the 51st Metro Manila Film Festival
Manila’s Finest	December 25, 2025	distribution only; produced by Cignal TV, MQuest Ventures, and Spring Films official entry to the 51st Metro Manila Film Festival

=== 2026 ===
Film	Release	Notes
A Werewolf Boy	January 14, 2026	co-production with Studio Viva and CJ ENM
The Loved One	February 11, 2026	co-production with Cornerstone Studios
A Special Memory	March 11, 2026	
Pater Noster	March 25, 2026	distribution only; produced by LGK Films
Wonderful Nightmare	April 4, 2026	
Rosario	August 5, 2026	co-production with Studio Viva
Ang Pinakamasarap na Pares sa Balat ng Lupa	August 26, 2026	
The Guardian	September 2, 2026	co-production with GV Labs, Will, Studios, Parallax Studio, Robosheep Studios, and Ovation Productions
Life After You	September 9, 2026	
Pee Mak	October 14, 2026	co-production with Studio Viva
VHS (Viva Horror Stories)	October 28, 2026	co-production with VinCentiments

== Upcoming films ==
Color key

- – a foreign film distributed by Viva International Pictures
- – Film(s) that are not colored/white colored are regular release in the cinemas and is not an entry to any film festival inside or outside the country.

Film	Cast	Release	Notes
Osyana	Kylie Verzosa	TBA	distribution only; produced by Epik Studios

== Distribution ==
Film	Release in the Philippines	Country	Notes	Ref.
Rush Hour	November 18, 1998	(United States)	distribution only; produced by New Line Cinema	
Dr. Dolittle	November 25, 1998	(United States)	distribution only; produced by 20th Century Studios	
The Corruptor	August 4, 1999	(United States)	distribution only; produced by New Line Cinema	
Pushing Tin	August 19, 1999	(United States)	distribution only; produced by 20th Century Studios	
Gladiator	June 7, 2000	(United States)	distribution only; produced by DreamWorks Pictures and Universal Pictures	
X-Men	August 30, 2000	(United States)	distribution only; produced by 20th Century Studios	
Nutty Professor II: The Klumps	October 25, 2000	(United States)	distribution only; produced by Universal Pictures	
Meet the Parents	January 4, 2001	(United States)	distribution only; produced by DreamWorks Pictures	
Save the Last Dance	March 19, 2001	(United States)	distribution only; produced by Paramount Pictures	
The Mummy Returns	May 27, 2001	(United States)	distribution only; produced by Universal Pictures	
Bridget Jones's Diary	August 8, 2001	(United States)	distribution only; produced by Universal Pictures	
Shrek	August 22, 2001	(United States)	distribution only; produced by DreamWorks Pictures	
Enemy at the Gates	September 12, 2001	(United States)	distribution only; produced by Paramount Pictures	
Zoolander	January 23, 2002	(United States)	distribution only; produced by Paramount Pictures	
A Beautiful Mind (film)	March 14, 2002	(United States)	distribution only; produced by Universal Pictures	
Jimmy Neutron: Boy Genius	March 21, 2002	(United States)	distribution only; produced by Paramount Pictures	
D-Tox	March 28, 2002	(United States)	distribution only; produced by Universal Pictures	
The Scorpion King	April 17, 2002	(United States)	distribution only; produced by Universal Pictures	
Big Fat Liar	July 3, 2002	(United States)	distribution only; produced by Universal Pictures	
About a Boy (film)	July 24, 2002	(United States)	distribution only; produced by Universal Pictures	
K-19: The Widowmaker	September 17, 2002	(United States)	distribution only; produced by Paramount Pictures	
The Tuxedo	October 2, 2002	(United States)	distribution only; produced by DreamWorks Pictures	
Changing Lanes	November 10, 2002	(United States)	distribution only; produced by Paramount Pictures	
Blue Crush	December 1, 2002	(United States)	distribution only; produced by Universal Pictures	
The Ring (2002 film)	January 9, 2003	(United States)	distribution only; produced by DreamWorks Pictures	
8 Mile (film)	January 22, 2003	(United States)	distribution only; produced by Universal Pictures	
Hulk (film)	June 16, 2003	(United States)	distribution only; produced by Universal Pictures	
Jackass: The Movie	July 17, 2003	(United States)	distribution only; produced by Paramount Pictures	
Lara Croft: Tomb Raider – The Cradle of Life	July 24, 2003	(United States)	distribution only; produced by Paramount Pictures	
The Italian Job	August 20, 2003	(United States)	distribution only; produced by Paramount Pictures	
Sinbad: Legend of the Seven Seas	September 3, 2003	(United States)	distribution only; produced by DreamWorks Pictures	
2 Fast 2 Furious	october 6, 2003	(United States)	distribution only; produced by Universal Pictures	
The Fighting Temptations	December 10, 2003	(United States)	distribution only; produced by Paramount Pictures	
School of Rock	April 28, 2004	(United States)	distribution only; produced by Paramount Pictures	
Open Water	September 10, 2004	(United States)	distribution only; produced by Lions Gate Films	
Doll Master	October 13, 2004	(South Korea)	distribution only; produced by Cineclick asia	
Saw	November 24, 2004	(United States)	distribution only; produced by Lionsgate	
Wicker Park	November 10, 2004	(United States)	distribution only; produced by Metro-Goldwyn-Mayer	
White Noise	January 19' 2005	(United States)	distribution only; produced by Entertainment Film Distributors and Universal Pictures	
Out for a Kill	January' 2005	(United States)	distribution only; produced by Millennium Films	
Infection	February 23' 2005	(Japan)	distribution only; produced by Entertainment Film Distributors, TBS Holdings, TV Tokyo and Lionsgate	
Belly of the Beast	February' 2005	(United States)	distribution only; produced by Millennium Films	
The Final Cut	March 9, 2005	(United States)	distribution only; produced by Lionsgate	
The Wedding Date	April 13' 2005	(United States)	distribution only; produced by Gold Circle Films and Senator International	
Shattered Glass	May 2' 2005	(United States)	distribution only; produced by Lions Gate Films	
New Police Story	July 13' 2005	(Hong Kong)	distribution only; produced by Entertainment Film Distributors and JCE Movies Limited	
The Assassination of Richard Nixon	July 27' 2005	(United States)	distribution only; produced by ThinkFilm	
Arahan	August 3' 2005	(South Korea)	distribution only; produced by Cinema Service	
The Long Weekend	September 3' 2005	(Canada)	distribution only; produced by Gold Circle Films	
The Crow: Wicked Prayer	September 10, 2005	(United States)	distribution only; produced by Dimension Films	
Lord of War	October 5, 2005	(United States)	distribution only; produced by Ascendant Pictures Entertainment Manufacturing Company VIP Medienfonds and Saturn Films	
Undiscovered	October 12, 2005	(United States)	distribution only; produced by Cinejota	
Invisible Child (film)	October, 2005	(United States)	distribution only; produced by Gross-Weston Productions	
Waiting... (film)	November 2, 2005	(United States)	distribution only; produced by Element Films and Lionsgate Films	
The Myth	November 23, 2005	(Hong Kong)	distribution only; produced by JCE Movies Limited and Emperor Films	
Beautiful Boxer	January 8, 2006	(Thailand)	distribution only; produced by GMM Pictures and Archlight releasing	
Half Light (film)	January 25, 2006	(United States)	distribution only; produced by Lakeshore Entertainment and Samuels Media	
Saw II	February 1, 2006	(United States)	distribution only; produced by Twisted Pictures and Lionsgate	
The Prince & Me 2: The Royal Wedding	February, 2006	(United States)	distribution only; produced by First Look Studios and released thru Lionsgate	
A Chinese Tall Story	February 15, 2006	(Hong Kong)	distribution only; produced by Emperor Group	
House of Fury	March 8, 2006	(Hong Kong)	distribution only; produced by Emperor Entertainment Group|	
Slither (2006 film)	April 26, 2006	(United States)	distribution only; produced by Gold Circle Films	
The Cooler	May 2, 2006	(United States)	distribution only; produced by Lions Gate Films	
First Descent	Summer, 2006	(United States)	distribution only; produced by Gold Circle Films and Universal Pictures	
See No Evil (film)	July 5, 2006	(United States)	distribution only; produced by Lionsgate	
Fierce People (film)	August 9, 2006	(United States)	distribution only; produced by Lionsgate and Industry Entertainment	
The Lost City	September 13, 2006	(United States)	distribution only; produced by CineSon and Magnolia Pictures	
Crank (film)	September 13, 2006	(United States)	distribution only; produced by Lakeshore Entertainment	
The Breed (2006 film)	September 20, 2006	(United States)	distribution only; produced by Film Afrika Worldwide ApolloProMovie & Co. 1. Filmproduktion	
Green Street (film)	October 11, 2006	(United States)	distribution only; produced by Freestyle Releasing	
The Grudge 2	October 18, 2006	(United States)	distribution only; produced by Ghost House Pictures and Columbia Pictures	
Rob-B-Hood	January 6, 2007	(Hong Kong)	distribution only; produced by JCE Movies Limited Huayi Brothers and Emperor Motion Pictures	
Voces inocentes as Innocent Voices	January 16, 2007	(Spain)	distribution only; produced by Lionsgate and 20th Century Fox	
Neverwas	January 30, 2007	(Canada)	distribution only; produced by Sidney Kimmel Entertainment	
The Messengers	February 7, 2007	(United States)	distribution only; produced by Columbia Pictures Screen Gems and Ghost House Pictures	
It's a Boy Girl Thing	February 28, 2007	(United States)	distribution only; produced by Icon Entertainment International	
Because I Said So	March 14, 2007	(United States)	distribution only; produced by Gold Circle Films	
The Groomsmen	March 28, 2007	(United States)	distribution only; produced by Bauer Martinez Productions	
Miss Potter	April 7, 2007	(United States)	distribution only; produced by Phoenix Pictures UK Film Council BBC Films Grosvenor Park Media Isle of Man Film	
Gray Matters (2006 film)	April 25, 2007	(United States)	distribution only; produced by Freestyle Releasing[2]	
Whisper	May 16, 2007	(United States)	distribution only; produced by Gold Circle Films	
Seraphim Falls	June, 2007	(United States)	distribution only; produced by Samuel Goldwyn Films and Icon Films	
White Noise: The Light as White Noise 2	July 18, 2007	(United States)	distribution only; produced by Gold Circle Films Rogue Pictures and Brightlight pictures	
Zombie Nation (film)	August, 2007	(United States)	distribution only; produced by Zombie Nation (film) Heidenheim Films	
Rise: Blood Hunter	August 15, 2007	(United States)	distribution only; produced by Destination Films and Mandate Pictures	
1408 (film)	August 29, 2007	(United States)	distribution only; produced by The Weinstein Company and Metro-Goldwyn-Mayer	
War (2007 film) knownn as Rogue Assassin	September 12, 2007	(United States)	distribution only; produced by Lionsgate	
Harsh Times	October 3, 2007	(United States)	distribution only; produced by Bauer Martinez Entertainment	
Retribution (2006 film) as 叫, Sakebi	October 10, 2007	(Japan)	distribution only; produced by Avex Entertainment Xanadeux Company	
Butterfly on a Wheel	October 24, 2007	(United Kingdom) (Canada)	distribution only; produced by Icon Entertainment	
Halloween (2007 film)	October 31, 2007	(United States)	distribution only; produced by Dimension Films	
We Own the Night (film)	November 7, 2007	(United States)	distribution only; produced by 2929 Productions Columbia Pictures	
The Nanny Diaries (film)	November 14, 2007	(United States)	distribution only; produced by The Weinstein Company	
Ripley Under Ground (film)	Autumn, 2007	(United States)	distribution only; produced by Lionsgate	
Catacombs (2007 film)	December 12, 2007	(United States)	distribution only; produced by Twisted Pictures	
I Could Never Be Your Woman	January 8, 2008	(United States)	distribution only; produced by Bauer Martinez Studios	
Saw IV	January 30, 2008	(United States)	distribution only; produced by Lionsgate	
The Eye (2008 film)	February 6, 2008	(United States)	distribution only; produced by Lionsgate and Cruise/Wagner Productions	
3:10 to Yuma	February 27, 2008	(United States)	distribution only; produced by Lionsgate	
Juno	February 13, 2008	(United States)	distribution only; produced by Searchlight Pictures	
Sleuth (2007 film)	March 5, 2008	(United States)	distribution only; produced by Castle Rock Entertainment	
Solstice (film)	March 22, 2008	(United States)	distribution only; produced by Endgame Entertainment Solstice Productions	
The Air I Breathe	April 2, 2008	(United States)	distribution only; produced by Inferno Distribution	
Why Did I Get Married?	April 9, 2008	(United States)	distribution only; produced by Lionsgate	
The Forbidden Kingdom	April 18, 2008	(United States)	distribution only; produced by Lionsgate, Casey Silver Productions Huayi Brothers Relativity Media	
Mega Snake	May 14, 2008	(United States)	distribution only; produced by Nu image	
The Warlords	July 9, 2008	(Hong Kong)	distribution only; produced by Media Asia Films	
The Bank Job	July 23, 2008	(United States)	distribution only; produced by Relativity Media	
Smother (film)	August 27, 2008	(United States)	distribution only; produced by Variance Films	
Righteous Kill	September 10, 2008	(United States)	distribution only; produced by Overture Films	
Right at Your Door	September 17, 2008	(United States)	distribution only; produced by Roadside Attractions	
Imagine Me & You	September 17, 2008	(United Kingdom)	distribution only; produced by BBC Films	
My Best Friend's Girl	September 24, 2008	(United States)	distribution only; produced by Lionsgate	
Three Kingdoms: Resurrection of the Dragon	October 8, 2008	(Hong Kong)	distribution only; produced by China Film Group	
Igor	October 8, 2008	(United States)	distribution only; produced by Exodus Film Group	
The Women (2008 film)	November 12, 2008	(United States)	distribution only; produced by Picturehouse, New line cinema and Inferno distribution	
Fanboys (film)	November, 2008	(United States)	distribution only; produced by The Weinstein Company	
Boy A (film)	November, 2008	(United States)	distribution only; produced by Film 4	
Burn After Reading	November 19, 2008	(United States)	distribution only; produced by Focus Features	
Twilight	November 26, 2008	(United States)	distribution only; produced by Summit Entertainment	
The Spirit (2008 film)	January 8, 2009	(United States)	distribution only; produced by Summit Entertainment Lionsgate	
Saw V	January 28, 2009	(United States)	distribution only; produced by Summit Entertainment, Lionsgate and Twisted Pictures	
Milk (2008 American film)	February 4, 2009	(United States)	distribution only; produced by Focus Features	
Boogeyman 3	February, 2009	(United States)	distribution only; produced by Ghost House Pictures	
The Reader	February 25, 2009	(Germany)	distribution only; produced by Mirage Enterprises and Neunte Babelsberg Film GmbH	
The Lazarus Project	February, 2009	(United States)	distribution only; produced by Inferno Distribution	
Slumdog Millionaire	April 11, 2009	(United Kingdom)	distribution only; produced by Pathé Distribution[iii], Celador Films, Film4	
Crank: High Voltage	April 18, 2009	(United States)	distribution only; produced by Lionsgate	
The Haunting in Connecticut	April 22, 2009	(United States)	distribution only; produced by Lionsgate and Gold Circle Films	
Miss Pettigrew Lives for a Day	April 29, 2009	(United States)	distribution only; produced by Focus Features	
Death Defying Acts	April 29, 2009	(United States)	distribution only; produced by Lionsgate and Myriad Pictures	
Major Movie Star	May 2, 2009	(United States)	distribution only; produced by Emmett/Furla Films	
Ip Man	May 9, 2009	(Hong Kong)	distribution only; produced by Mandarin Films	
The Accidental Husband	May 23, 2009	(United States)	distribution only; produced by Yari Film Group	
Fuera del cielo	May, 2009	(Mexico)	distribution only; produced by Argos Comunicación, Fidecine, Videocine and Cinemex Producciones and Lionsgate	
Drag Me to Hell	June 3, 2009	(United States)	distribution only; produced by Mandate International, Lionsgate and Ghost House Pictures	
Shinjuku Incident	June 10, 2009	(Hong Kong)	distribution only; produced by Emperor Motion Pictures and JCE Movies Limited	
The Loss of a Teardrop Diamond	June 17, 2009	(United States)	distribution only; produced by Screen Media Films	
My Life in Ruins	July 22, 2009	(United States)	distribution only; produced by 26 Films Kanzaman Productions	
It's Alive (2009 film)	July 22, 2009	(United States)	distribution only; produced by Millennium Films	
Ong Bak 2	August 18, 2009	(Thailand)	distribution only; produced by Sahamongkol Film International	
District 9	August 25, 2009	(United States)	distribution only; produced by WingNut Films and QED International	
The Grudge 3	September 9, 2009	(United States)	distribution only; produced by Ghost House Pictures	
Management (film)	September 9, 2009	(United States)	distribution only; produced by Samuel Goldwyn Films	
Horsemen	September 16, 2009	(United States)	distribution only; produced by Mandate Pictures	
Red Cliff	October 14, 2009	(China)	distribution only; produced by [[Beijing Film Studio China Film Group]]	
The Echo	October 7, 2009	(United States)	distribution only; produced by Vertigo Entertainment	
Battle for Terra	October 14, 2009	(United States)	distribution only; produced by Lionsgate Films	
Beyond a Reasonable Doubt (2009 film)	October 21, 2009	(United States)	distribution only; produced by Anchor Bay Films	
Law Abiding Citizen	November 4, 2009	(United States)	distribution only; produced by The Film Department	
Paranormal Activity	November 25, 2009	(United States)	distribution only; produced by IM Global	
Bad Lieutenant: Port of Call New Orleans	December 9, 2009	(United States)	distribution only; produced by Millennium Films	
The Rebound	January 8, 2010	(United States)	distribution only; produced by The Film Department	
The Spy Next Door	January 15, 2010	(United States)	distribution only; produced by Relativity Media	
From Paris with Love (film)	February 24, 2010	(France)	distribution only; produced by EuropaCorp	
The Fourth Kind	March 3, 2010	(United States)	distribution only; produced by Gold Circle Films	
Brooklyn's Finest	March, 2010	(United States)	distribution only; produced by Overture Films	
The Box	March 10, 2010	(United States)	distribution only; produced by Media Rights Capital	
Possession (2009 film)	April 2, 2010	(United States)	distribution only; produced by Yari Film Group	
Kick-Ass (film)	April 16, 2010	(United States)	distribution only; produced by Lionsgate	
Little Big Soldier	May 23, 2010	(Hong Kong)	distribution only; produced by Beijing Dragon Garden Culture & Art (co-presented by) Jackie & JJ Productions (co-presented by) Beijing Universe Starlight Culture Media (co-presented by) Talent International Film Cultural Company (co-presented by)	
Ninja (film)	June 23, 2010	(United States)	distribution only; produced by Nu Image	
Thick as Thieves (2009 film) as The Code	June, 2010	(United States)	distribution only; produced by Nu Image and Millennium Films	
StreetDance 3D	July 7, 2010	(United Kingdom)	distribution only; produced by Vertigo Films and BBC Films	
The Expendables (2010 film)	August 13, 2010	(United States)	distribution only; produced by Millennium Films and Nu Image	
The American (2010 film)	September 29, 2010	(United States)	distribution only; produced by Focus Features	
Piranha 3D	October 6, 2010	(United States)	distribution only; produced by Dimension Films	
Alpha and Omega (film)	October 13, 2010	(United States)	distribution only; produced by Lionsgate	
Skyline (2010 film)	November 24, 2010	(United States)	distribution only; produced by IM Global Rogue Relativity Media	
The Next Three Days	December 1, 2010	(United States)	distribution only; produced by Lionsgate	
Season of the Witch	January 26, 2011	(United States)	distribution only; produced by Relativity Media	
The Mechanic	February 9, 2011	(United States)	distribution only; produced by Millennium Films	
Drive Angry	February 25, 2011	(United States)	distribution only; produced by Millennium Films	
The Eagle (2011 film)	March 9, 2011	(United States)	distribution only; produced by Focus Features	
Fair Game (2010 film)	March 2011	(United States)	distribution only; produced by Summit Entertainment	
Beastly	April 23, 2011	(United States)	distribution only; produced by CBS Films	
The King's Speech	May 11, 2011	(United Kingdom)	distribution only; produced by Transmission Films	
Insidious (film)	June 1, 2011	(United States)	distribution only; produced by FilmDistrict	
Prowl	June, 2011	(United States)	distribution only; produced by After Dark Films	
Scream of the Banshee	July, 2011	(United States)	distribution only; produced by After Dark Films	
Blitz (2011 film)	July 20, 2011	(United States)	distribution only; produced by Lionsgate UK	
Larry Crowne	August 3, 2011	(United States)	distribution only; produced by Vendôme Pictures	
Ceremony (2010 film)	August, 2011	(United States)	distribution only; produced by NALA Films	
Colombiana	August 24, 2011	(United States)	distribution only; produced by EuropaCorp, TF1 Films Production, Grive Productions, Canal+	
Hoodwinked Too! Hood vs. Evil	August, 2011	(United States)	distribution only; produced by The Weinstein Company	
Trust (2010 film)	September 7, 2011	(United States)	distribution only; produced by Nu Image	
Spy Kids: All the Time in the World	September 14, 2011	(United States)	distribution only; produced by Dimension Films	
Warrior (film)	September 28, 2011	(United States)	distribution only; produced by Lionsgate	
Bunraku (film)	September, 2011	(United States)	distribution only; produced by Snoot Entertainment	
Night of the Demons (2009 film)	September, 2011	(United States)	distribution only; produced by Seven Arts International	
Apollo 18 (film)	October 5, 2011	(United States)	distribution only; produced by Dimension Films	
Killer Elite (film)	October 12, 2011	(United States)	distribution only; produced by Omnilab Media Ambience Entertainment	
Drive (2011 film)	October 26, 2011	(United States)	distribution only; produced by Bold Films, OddLot Entertainment, Marc Platt Productions, Motel Movies	
Trespass (2011 film)	November 2, 2011	(United States)	distribution only; produced by Millennium Films	
There Be Dragons	November 11, 2011	(Spain)	distribution only; produced by Samuel Goldwyn Films	
The Grey (film)	February 1, 2012	(United States)	distribution only; produced by Open Road Films, LD Entertainment Scott Free Productions 1984 Private Defense Contractors	
Dark Tide	Spring, 2012	(United States)	distribution only; produced by Wrekin Hill Entertainment	
My Week with Marilyn	February 29, 2012	(United States)	distribution only; produced by The Weinstein Company and BBC Film	
Safe (2012 film)	May 16, 2012	(United States)	distribution only; produced by IM Global and Lionsgate	
StreetDance 2	May 23, 2012	(United States)	distribution only; produced by BBC Films and Vertigo Films	
The Raven (2012 film)	June 1, 2012	(United States)	distribution only; produced by FilmNation Entertainment and Intrepid Pictures	
Lockout (film)	June 13, 2012	(United States)	distribution only; produced by Europacorp	
Magic Mike	July 10, 2012	(United States)	distribution only; produced by FilmNation Entertainment	
The Expendables 2	August 16, 2012	(United States)	distribution only; produced by Lionsgate and Nu Image	
The Raid (2011 film)	September 5, 2012	(Indonesia)	distribution only; produced by XYZ Films	
The Entitled	September, 2012	(Canada)	distribution only; produced by Anchor films	
An Invisible Sign	September, 2012	(United States)	distribution only; produced by iDeal Partners Films 120 dB Films Silverwood Films	
Quick	September 26, 2012	(South Korea)	distribution only; produced by CJ Entertainment	
Sinister (film)	October 10, 2012	(United States)	distribution only; produced by IM Global	
Arwah Goyang Karawang	October 10, 2012	(Indonesia)	distribution only; produced by Sentra Mega Kreasi Multivision Plus	
In the Land of Blood and Honey	October, 2012	(Serbia)	distribution only; produced by GK Films	
The Courier (2012 film)	October 2012	(United States)	distribution only; produced by Arclight Films	
The Reef 2: High Tide	October/Autumn, 2012	(United States)	distribution only; produced by CJ Entertainment	
Seeking Justice	October 2012	(United States)	distribution only; produced by Endgame Entertainment	
Don't Look Up	October 2012	(United States)	distribution only; produced by Reel Deal Entertainment	
Looper (film)	October 17, 2012	(United States)	distribution only; produced by Endgame Entertainment	
Arbitrage (film)	November, 2012	(United States)	distribution only; produced by Lionsgate Roadside Attractions	
Chernobyl Diaries	November 7, 2012	(United States)	distribution only; produced by FilmNation Entertainment	
Stolen	November 21, 2012	(United States)	distribution only; produced by Millennium Entertainment	
House at the End of the Street	December 5, 2012	(United States)	distribution only; produced by Relativity Media	
The Bay (film)	December 19, 2012	(United States)	distribution only; produced by IM Global	
Killing Them Softly	December 12, 2012	(United States)	distribution only; produced by Plan B Entertainment	
Red Dawn (2012 film)	January 9, 2013	(United States)	distribution only; produced by FilmDistrict	
A Haunted House	January 16, 2013	(United States)	distribution only; produced by IM Global	
Parker (2013 film)	January 23, 2013	(United States)	distribution only; produced by Current Entertainment Alexander/Mitchell Anvil Films and Sydney Kimmel Films	
Broken City	February 6, 2013	(United States)	distribution only; produced by Regency Enterprises and Emmett/Furla Films Inferno Distribution Black Bear Pictures	
Smiley (2012 film)	February 13, 2013	(United States)	distribution only; produced by Level 10 Films	
Playing for Keeps (2012 film)	February 13, 2013	(United States)	distribution only; produced by FilmDistrict	
Playback (2012 film)	March, 2013	(United States)	distribution only; produced by Emmett/Furla Films	
21 & Over (film)	March 6, 2013	(United States)	distribution only; produced by Relativity Media with IM Global	
Dead Man Down	March 20, 2013	(United States)	distribution only; produced by WWE Studios with IM Global	
Fire with Fire (2012 film)	Summer, 2013	(United States)	distribution only; produced by Emmett/Furla Films with Lionsgate	
Admission (film)	March 20, 2013	(United States)	distribution only; produced by Focus Features	
Apartment 1303 3D	March 20, 2013	(Canada)	distribution only; produced by MonteCristo International Entertainment	
Friends with Kids	Summer/ Spring season 2013	(United States)	distribution only; produced by Roadside Attractions	
The Host (2013 film)	march 30, 2013	(United States)	distribution only; produced by [[IAV International Silver Reel Nick Wechsler Productions Chockstone Pictures]]	
Olympus Has Fallen	April 10, 2013	(United States)	distribution only; produced by Millennium Films	
Spiders 3D	April 17, 2013	(United States)	distribution only; produced by Millennium Films	
Dark Skies	May 1, 2013	(United States)	distribution only; produced by Dimension Films	
Scary Movie 5	May 15, 2013	(United States)	distribution only; produced by Dimension Films	
The Objective	Summer, 2013	(United States)	distribution only; produced by IFC Films	
Side Effects	June 5, 2013	(United States)	distribution only; produced by FilmNation Entertainment	
Gambit (2012 film)	June 19, 2013	(United States)	distribution only; produced by FilmNation Entertainment	
The Place Beyond the Pines	June 26, 2013	(United States)	distribution only; produced by Sidney Kimmel Entertainment	
Erased (2012 film)	August 28, 2013	(United States)	distribution only; produced by RaDiUS-TWC	
StreetDance All Stars	September 4, 2013	(United Kingdom)	distribution only; produced by Vertigo Films	
Bitch Slap	2013	(United States)	distribution only; produced by IM Global	
Metallica: Through the Never	October, 2013	(United States)	distribution only; produced by IM Global and Blackened Recordings	
Free Birds	November 13, 2013	(United States)	distribution only; produced by Relativity Media	
As I Lay Dying (film)	November 27, 2013	(United States)	distribution only; produced by RabbitBandini Productions	
The Kane Files: Life of Trial	November, 2013	(United States)	distribution only; produced by Revel Entertainment (I)	
Ender's Game (film)	December 4, 2013	(United States)	distribution only; produced by Summit Entertainment and Oddlot Entertainment	
The ABCs of Death	Autumn, 2013	(United States)	distribution only; produced by Magnet Releasing	
The Wolf of Wall Street (2013 film)	January 9, 2014	(United States)	distribution only; produced by Red Granite Pictures	
Snowpiercer	January 29, 2014	(United States) (South Korea)	distribution only; produced by CJ Entertainment	
Ninja: Shadow of a Tear	February 26, 2014	(United States)	distribution only; produced by Nu Image	
American Hustle	February 5, 2014	(United States)	distribution only; produced by Atlas Entertainment and Annapurna Pictures	
Homefront (2013 film)	February 19, 2014	(United States)	distribution only; produced by Millennium Films	
Grand Piano	February 26, 2014	(United States)	distribution only; produced by Nostromo Pictures	
Devil's Knot (film)	March 12, 2014	(United States)	distribution only; produced by Image Entertainment	
Second Sight 3D	April 2, 2014	(Thailand)	distribution only; produced by Five Star Productions	
Transcendence	April 19, 2014	(United States)	distribution only; produced by Summit Entertainment	
Brick Mansions	May 7, 2014	(United States)	distribution only; produced by Relativity Media	
Oculus (film)	May 14, 2014	(United States)	distribution only; produced by Relativity Media	
Walk of Shame (film)	May 21, 2014	(United States)	distribution only; produced by Lakeshore Entertainment and Focus World	
Liberal Arts (film)	Summer, 2014	(United States)	distribution only; produced by Strategic Motion Ventures BCDF Pictures	
The Raid 2	June 18, 2014	(Indonesia)	distribution only; produced by XYZ Films	
Chef	July 2, 2014	(United States)	distribution only; produced by Favreau Entertainment	
3 A.M. 3D	July 16, 2014	(Thailand)	distribution only; produced by Five Star Production	
Under the Skin (2013 film)	July 23, 2014	(United States)	distribution only; produced by StudioCanal and FilmNation Entertainment	
The Bag Man	August 6, 2014	(United States)	distribution only; produced by Red Granite Pictures	
The Expendables 3	August 13, 2014	(United States)	distribution only; produced by Lionsgate and Nu Image	
Sin City: A Dame to Kill For	August 27, 2014	(United States)	distribution only; produced by Dimension Films, Aldamisa Entertainment, Demarest Films Troublemaker Studios, Miramax, Solipsist Films	
And So It Goes	September 24, 2014	(United States)	distribution only; produced by Castle Rock Entertainment and Foresight Unlimited	
Two Night Stand	October 1, 2014	(United States)	distribution only; produced by Entertainment One	
The November Man	October 8, 2014	(United States)	distribution only; produced by Relativity Media	
Detective Conan: Dimensional Sniper	October 15, 2014	(Japan)	distribution only; produced by Nippon Television International Corporation Shogakukan TMS Entertainment	
The Best of Me	October 22, 2014	(United States)	distribution only; produced by Di Novi Pictures and Relativity Media	
Stonehearst Asylum	November 5, 2014	(United States)	distribution only; produced by Di Novi Pictures and Millennium Films and Icon Productions	
Horns (film)	November 12, 2014	(United States)	distribution only; produced by Di Novi Pictures and Red Granite Pictures and VVS Films	
Alien Outpost	November 26, 2014	(United States)	distribution only; produced by Di Novi Pictures and Altitude Film Entertainment and IFC Films	
Dumb and Dumber To	December 3, 2014	(United States)	distribution only; produced by Red Granite Pictures and New Line Cinema	
Laggies	December 10, 2014	(United States)	distribution only; produced by A24 and Anonymous Content	
Before I Go to Sleep	January 8, 2015	(United Kingdom)	distribution only; produced by Red Granite Pictures and StudioCanal	
The Woman in Black: Angel of Death	January 14, 2015	(United Kingdom)	distribution only; produced by Entertainment One and Relativity Media	
See No Evil 2	January, 2015	(United States)	distribution only; produced by WWE Films	
In Secret (film)	January, 2015	(United States)	distribution only; produced by LD Entertainment	
The Face of Love (2013 film)	January, 2015	(United States)	distribution only; produced by Mockingbird Pictures	
Autómata	January 28, 2015	(United States)	distribution only; produced by Contracorrientes Films	
Reclaim (film)	February 4, 2015	(United States)	distribution only; produced by Grindstone Entertainment Group	
Only God Forgives	February, 2015	(United States)	distribution only; produced by Motel Movies, Bold Films	
The Taking of Deborah Logan	February 11, 2015	(United States)	distribution only; produced by Eagle Films	
Dragon Blade (film)	February 18, 2015	(China)	distribution only; produced by Beijing Cultural Assets Chinese Film & Television Fund Home Media and Entertainment and Shanghai Film Group	
Predestination	February 25, 2015	(United States)	distribution only; produced by Pinnacle Films	
The Humbling (film)	February, 2015	(United States)	distribution only; produced by Millennium Films	
Elsa & Fred (2014 film)	February, 2015	(United States)	distribution only; produced by Millennium Entertainment	
Gangnam Blues	March 4, 2015	(South Korea)	distribution only; produced by Showbox/Mediaplex	
Serena (2014 film)	March 4, 2015	(United States)	distribution only; produced by StudioCanal	
Exists (film)	March 11, 2015	(United States)	distribution only; produced by Miscellaneous Entertainment	
From Vegas to Macau	March 25, 2015	(Hong Kong)	distribution only; produced by Mega-Vision Pictures, Television Broadcasts Limited, Bona Film Group, Golden Pictures Entertainment, Sun Entertainment Culture	
Once Upon a Time in Shanghai (2014 film)	March 25, 2015	(Hong Kong)	distribution only; produced by Mega-Vision Pictures, See Movie Limited, Henan Film and Television Production, Henan Film Studio, Meiya Great Wall Media (Beijing)	
Clown (film)	March 25, 2015	(United States)	distribution only; produced by Cross Creek Pictures	
3 A.M. 3D part 2	April 8, 2015	(Thailand)	distribution only; produced by Five Star Production	
While We're Young (film)	May 6, 2015	(United States)	distribution only; produced by Scott Rudin Productions	
Monsters: Dark Continent	May 13, 2015	(United States)	distribution only; produced by Vertigo Films	
Mourning Grave	May 20, 2015	(South Korea)	distribution only; produced by Ghost Pictures, Jupiter Films	
Lost River (film)	May 20, 2015	(United States)	distribution only; produced by Marc Platt Productions	
Infini	May 27, 2015	(United States)	distribution only; produced by Vertical Entertainment	
Outcast (2014 film)	June 4, 2015	(United States)	distribution only; produced by Media Max Productions Notorious Films 22h22	
Ode to My Father	June 18, 2015	(South Korea)	distribution only; produced by CJ Entertainment	
Kruel	June 11, 2015	(Canada)	distribution only; produced by Sunset Undiscovered	
Stand by Me Doraemon	June 17, 2015	(Japan)	distribution only; produced by Robot Communications and Toho	
Andron (film)	Winter 2015	(United States)	distribution only; produced by Momentum Pictures	
My Love, My Bride (2014 film)	July 1, 2015	(South Korea)	distribution only; produced by Cineguru	
The Thieves	July 1, 2015	(South Korea)	distribution only; produced by Showbox/Mediaplex	
Survivor (film)	July 8, 2015	(United States)	distribution only; produced by Millennium Media	
Love Forecast	July 15, 2015	(South Korea)	distribution only; produced by Popcorn F&M	
Doraemon: Nobita's Space Heroes	July, 2015	(Japan)	distribution only; produced by Shin-Ei Animation	
The Runner (2015 film)	Autumn, 2015	(United States)	distribution only; produced by Paper Street Films	
How to Steal a Dog	August 18, 2015	(South Korea)	distribution only; produced by Samgeori Pictures	
Rise of the Legend	August, 2015	(Hong Kong)	distribution only; produced by Edko Films, Irresistible Films	
Exeter (film)	August 18, 2015	(United States)	distribution only; produced by Blumhouse Productions, Bloodline Productions	
We Are Your Friends	August 26, 2015	(United States)	distribution only; produced by Working Title Films	
As the Gods Will	October 14, 2015	(Japan)	distribution only; produced by Toho	
Revenge of the Green Dragons	October 28, 2015	(United States)	distribution only; produced by IM Global Octane	
The Demented (2013)	October, 2015	(United States)	distribution only; produced by Hollywood Media Bridge	
Little Boy (film)	Winter 2015	(United States)	distribution only; produced by Metanoia Films	
Gekijōban Zero as Fatal Frame	December 9, 2015	(Japan)	distribution only; produced by Tecmo Games	
The Hallow	December 9, 2015	(Republic of Ireland)	distribution only; produced by Entertainment One	
A Cry from Within	January 2016	(United States)	distribution only; produced by Breaking Glass Pictures	
The Occupants (2014)	January 2016	(United States)	distribution only; produced by Blood Relative Productions	
Heidi (2015 film)	January 2016	(Switzerland)	distribution only; produced by StudioCanal	
Legend (2015 film)	January 8, 2016	(United States)	distribution only; produced by StudioCanal	
The Boy (2016 film)	January 27, 2016	(United States)	distribution only; produced by STX Entertainment	
Pride and Prejudice and Zombies	February 5, 2016	(United States)	distribution only; produced by Cross Creek Pictures, Sierra Pictures, MadRiver Pictures, QC Entertainment, Allison Shearmur Productions, Handsomecharlie Films, Head Gear Films	
The Choice (2016 film)	February 17, 2016	(United States)	distribution only; produced by Nicholas Sparks Productions	
London Has Fallen	March 2, 2016	(United States)	distribution only; produced by Millennium Films and Gramercy Pictures	
Ju-On: The Final Curse as Ju On Final Grudge	March 9, 2016	(Japan)	distribution only; produced by	
The Himalayas (film)	March 9, 2016	(South Korea)	distribution only; produced by CJ Entertainment	
Norm Of The North	March 16, 2016	(United States)	distribution only; produced by Lionsgate and Splash Entertainment	
Garm Wars: The Last Druid	March 16, 2016	(United States)	distribution only; produced by Production I.G and Arc Entertainment	
My Big Fat Greek Wedding 2	April 20, 2016	(United States)	distribution only; produced by Gold Circle Films and HBO Films	
Pelé: Birth of a Legend	May, 2016	(United States)	distribution only; produced by Imagine Entertainment	
Ip Man 3	May 11, 2016	(Hong Kong)	distribution only; produced by Dreams Salon Entertainment Culture Pegasus Motion Pictures[1] Starbright Communications Super Hero Films	
The Nice Guys	May 25, 2016	(United States)	distribution only; produced by Waypoint Entertainment	
The Girl in the Photographs	june, 2016	(United States)	distribution only; produced by Vertical Entertainment	
A Bigger Splash (2015 film)	june, 2016	(United States)	distribution only; produced by StudioCanal AND Cota	
A Man and a Woman (2016 film)	june, 2016	(South Korea)	distribution only; produced by Showbox	
Fifty Shades of Black	June 22, 2016	(United States)	distribution only; produced by IM Global	
Before I Wake	June 29, 2016	(United States)	distribution only; produced by Intrepid Pictures	
Time Renegades	June, 2016	(South Korea)	distribution only; produced by CJ Entertainment	
Up for Love	June, 2016	(France)	distribution only; produced by Gaumont	
Misconduct (film)	July, 2016	(United States)	distribution only; produced by Grindstone Entertainment Group	
Ao Oni ver 2.0	July, 2016	(Japan)	distribution only; produced by	
Cell (film)	July 18, 2016	(United States)	distribution only; produced by Benaroya Pictures	
Chuck (film)	2016	(United States)	distribution only; produced by Millennium Films and IFC Films	
Sadako vs. Kayako	July 25, 2016	(Japan)	distribution only; produced by PKDN Films	
Skiptrace	August 10, 2016	(Hong Kong)	distribution only; produced by Dasym Entertainment, Talent International Film Cultural Company, Cider Mill Pictures, InterTitle Films, JC Group International Talent International Media	
Mechanic: Resurrection	August 24, 2016	(United States)	distribution only; produced by Millennium Films	
The Curse of Sleeping Beauty	August 31, 2016	(United States)	distribution only; produced by 2B Films, Briar Rose Productions, Nexus Motion Picture Company	
Sing Street	September 7, 2016	(United States)	distribution only; produced by FilmNation Entertainment	
The Infiltrator (2016 film)	September 14, 2016	(United States)	distribution only; produced by Broad Green Pictures	
Eliminators (2016 film)	September, 2016	(United States)	distribution only; produced by WWE Studios	
Masterminds (2016 film)	September 21, 2016	(United States)	distribution only; produced by Relativity Studios	
Howl (film)	September 28, 2016	(United States)	distribution only; produced by Starchild Pictures	
The Disappointments Room	October 5, 2016	(United States)	distribution only; produced by Relativity Media	
Operation Chromite (film)	October 12, 2016	(South Korea)	distribution only; produced by CJ Entertainment	
Kill Command	October, 2016	(United Kingdom)	distribution only; produced by Vertigo Films	
Eyes Japan	October 26, 2016	(Japan)	distribution only; produced by Jolly Roger Studios, PAL Entertainments	
Tunnel (2016 film)	November 2, 2016	(South Korea)	distribution only; produced by Showbox	
Seoul Station (film)	November, 2016	(South Korea)	distribution only; produced by Next Entertainment World	
The Age of Shadows	November 23, 2016	(South Korea)	distribution only; produced by Grimm Pictures and Warner Bros Pictures	
The Unspoken (film)	November, 2016	(United States)	distribution only; produced by Lighthouse Pictures, Sapphire Fire Limited	
Poveda	November 30, 2016	(Spain)	distribution only; produced by Goya Producciones and JesCom Films	
A Violent Prosecutor	January 25, 2017	(South Korea)	distribution only; produced by Showbox	
Three Summer Night	January, 2017	(South Korea)	distribution only; produced by Little Big Pictures, Invent D	
Master (2016 film)	January, 2017	(South Korea)	distribution only; produced by CJ Entertainment	
Railroad Tigers	February 18, 2017	(China)	distribution only; produced by Shanghai Film Group, Yaolai Entertainment Media, Shanghai New Culture Media Group, Beijing Motianlun Media	
The Assignment as Tomboy or Revengers	March 22, 2017	(United States)	distribution only; produced by Saban Films	
American Pastoral (film)	March 29, 2017	(United States)	distribution only; produced by Lionsgate	
Lion (2016 film)	April 5, 2017	(Australia)	distribution only; produced by Screen Australia	
You Call It Passion	Summer, 2017	(South Korea)	distribution only; produced by Banzakbanzak Film	
The Unbidden (2016)	Summer, 2017	(United States)	distribution only; produced by Margin Films Thunder Communications International	
The Zookeeper's Wife (film)	April 26, 2017	(United States)	distribution only; produced by Scion Films, Electric City Entertainment, Tollin Productions	
One Step (film)	May 3, 2017	(South Korea)	distribution only; produced by Dream Fact Entertainment	
The Big Sick	Summer, 2017	(United States)	distribution only; produced by FilmNation Entertainment	
Unlocked (2017 film)	May 17, 2017	(United States)	distribution only; produced by Di Bonaventura Pictures	
Warriors of the Dawn	June, 2017	(South Korea)	distribution only; produced by REALies Pictures	
The King's Case Note	June, 2017	(South Korea)	distribution only; produced by CJ Entertainment	
Fabricated City	June 7, 2017	(South Korea)	distribution only; produced by CJ Entertainment	
Gonin Saga	June, 2017	(Japan)	distribution only; produced by Kadokawa Corporation	
The Hitman's Bodyguard	August 23, 2017	(United States)	distribution only; produced by Millennium Media and Lionsgate	
The Battleship Island	August 30, 2017	(South Korea)	distribution only; produced by CJ Entertainment	
Real (2017 film)	August, 2017	(South Korea)	distribution only; produced by CJ E&M, Alibaba Pictures, Global Road Entertainment	
Logan Lucky	September 6, 2017	(United States)	distribution only; produced by Fingerprint Releasing	
Khali the Killer	September, 2017	(United States)	distribution only; produced by Nu Image	
Mark Felt: The Man Who Brought Down the White House	September 13, 2017	(United States)	distribution only; produced by Endurance Media Ventures and Scott Free Productions	
A Taxi Driver	September, 2017	(South Korea)	distribution only; produced by Showbox	
The Foreigner (2017 film)	October 18, 2017	(United States)	distribution only; produced by STX Films	
The Hunter's Prayer	October, 2017	(United States)	distribution only; produced by Saban Films and Vandal Entertainment	
Hostiles (film)	Autumn, 2017	(United States)	distribution only; produced by Entertainment Studios	
Midnight Runners	November 29, 2017	(South Korea)	distribution only; produced by Lotte Entertainment	
A Bad Moms Christmas	December 6, 2017	(United States)	distribution only; produced by STX Films	
Jeepers Creepers 3	January 8, 2018	(United States)	distribution only; produced by Myriad Pictures	
All the Money in the World	January 17, 2018	(United States)	distribution only; produced by STX Films TriStar Pictures, Imperative Entertainment, Scott Free Productions, RedRum Films	
Along with the Gods: The Two Worlds	February 7, 2018	(South Korea)	distribution only; produced by Lotte Entertainment	
Bleeding Steel	February 21, 2018	(China)	distribution only; produced by Heyi Pictures	
Den of Thieves (film)	March 7, 2018	(United States)	distribution only; produced by STX Films	
Escape Room (2017 film)	March, 2018	(United States)	distribution only; produced by Escape Productions, Voltage Pictures	
Selfie from Hell	March 14, 2018	(Canada)	distribution only; produced by IndustryWorks Studios	
Acts of Violence	April 11, 2018	(United States)	distribution only; produced by Grindstone Entertainment Group, Emmett/Furla/Oasis Films	
Beirut (film)	April 18, 2018	(United States)	distribution only; produced by Radar Pictures	
House on Willow Street	April 2018	(South Africa)	distribution only; produced by Darkside, Fat Cigar Productions	
Looking Glass (film)	Summer, 2018	(United States)	distribution only; produced by Highland Film Group, Kirk Shaw Productions, Prettybird, Silver State Production Services, Ingenious Media	
At First Light (film)	Summer, 2018	(United States)	distribution only; produced by Oddfellows, Bunk 11 Pictures	
1987: When the Day Comes	Summer, 2018	(South Korea)	distribution only; produced by CJ Entertainment	
Show Dogs	May 23, 2018	(United States)	distribution only; produced by Global Road Entertainment	
The Accidental Detective 2: In Action	June, 2018	(South Korea)	distribution only; produced by CJ Entertainment	
Escobar: Loving Pablo	June 20, 2018	(Spain)	distribution only; produced by Escobar Films and B2Y Productions	
Adrift	June 27, 2018	(United States)	distribution only; produced by Lakeshore Entertainment, Ingenious Media, RVK Studios, Huayi Brothers Pictures, and STXfilms	
Kickboxer: Retaliation	July 11, 2018	(United States)	distribution only; produced by Our House Films and Acme Rocket Fuel	
Billionaire Boys Club	July 18, 2018	(United States)	distribution only; produced by Armory Films	
Behind the Walls	July 25, 2018	(United States)	distribution only; produced by Dual Visions and Roaming Elephant Productions	
Kuntilanak	August 8, 2018	(Indonesia)	distribution only; produced by MVP Pictures	
Along with the Gods: The Last 49 Days	September 5, 2018	(South Korea)	distribution only; produced by Realies Pictures and Dexter Studios	
A.X.N.	September 12, 2018	(United States)	distribution only; produced by Lakeshore Entertainment	
Peppermint	September 26, 2018	(United States)	distribution only; produced by Lakeshore Entertainment, Tang Media, Huayi Brothers	
Destination Wedding	October 3, 2018	(United States)	distribution only; produced by Sunshine Pictures, Two Camel Films, and The Fyzz Facility	
Mile 22	October 10, 2018	(United States)	distribution only; produced by STXfilms and Huayi Brothers	
I Still See You	October 17, 2018	(United States)	distribution only; produced by Gold Circle Films	
Hunter Killer	October 31, 2018	(United States)	distribution only; produced by Original Film, Millennium Films, and G-BASE	
Acts of Vengeance (film)	Winter, 2018	(United States)	distribution only; produced by Millennium Films with Saban Films	
The Row	November, 2018	(United States)	distribution only; produced by Emmett/Furla Oasis	
The Cleaning Lady (2018)	Winter, 2018	(United States)	distribution only; produced by RLJE Films	
The Happytime Murders	Winter, 2018	(United States)	distribution only; produced by STX Films	
The School	November 28, 2018	(Australia)	distribution only; produced by Bronte Pictures and Head Gear Films	
Second Act	January 30, 2019	(United States)	distribution only; produced by STX Films and H. Brothers	
Serenity	February 13, 2019	(United States)	distribution only; produced by Global Road Entertainment, Starlings Entertainment, Nebulastar, and Shoebox Films	
Backtrace (film)	March 27, 2019	(United States)	distribution only; produced by Lionsgate, Grindstone Entertainment Group, Ingenious Media,	
Take Point	March 20, 2019	(South Korea)	distribution only; produced by Perfect Storm Film	
Hellboy	April 10, 2019	(United States)	distribution only; produced by Lionsgate, Millennium Films, Campbell Grobman Films, Dark Horse Entertainment, Applebox Entertainment	
UglyDolls	May 8, 2019	(United States)	distribution only; produced by STX Family, Reel FX Animation Studios, Alibaba Pictures, Original Force, Troublemaker Studios	
Poms (film)	May, 2019	(United States)	distribution only; produced by STX Films	
Accident (2017)	Summer, 2019	(United States)	distribution only; produced by Forefront Media Group	
Domino (2019 film)	Summer, 2019	(United States)	distribution only; produced by Signature Entertainment	
Stockholm (2018 film)	Summer, 2019	(United States)	distribution only; produced by Darius Films	
Dragged Across Concrete	July 17, 2019	(United States)	distribution only; produced by Unified Pictures, Assemble Media, Cinestate, Look to the Sky Films, Moot Point Productions	
Isabelle	July 24, 2019	(United States)	distribution only; produced by Lazarus Effects, Out of the Blue Entertainment, Rob Heydon Productions, The Wanting Film	
Come on Irene	July 31, 2019	(Japan)	distribution only; produced by Star Sands, The Asahi Shimbun Company, VAP	
Parasite	August 14, 2019	(South Korea)	distribution only; produced by Barunson E&A Corp	
Angel Has Fallen	August 21, 2019	(United States)	distribution only; produced by Millennium Media, G–BASE	
Polaroid	September 4, 2019	(United States)	distribution only; produced by Dimension Films, Benderspink, Eldorado Film, Vertigo Entertainment	
Rambo: Last Blood	September 20, 2019	(United States)	distribution only; produced by Millennium Media, Balboa Productions, Templeton Media	
Athlete	September 25, 2019	(Japan)	distribution only	
The Wedding Year	October 9, 2019	(United States)	distribution only; produced by Lakeshore Entertainment	
The Current War	October 16, 2019	(United States)	distribution only; produced by Bazelevs Company, Film Rites, Thunder Road Pictures	
Sadako	October 30, 2019	(Japan)	distribution only; produced by Kadokawa Pictures	
The Dude in Me	November 6, 2019	(South Korea)	distribution only; produced by The Contents On and Merry Christmas	
Cinta itu Buta (Love is Blind)	November 13, 2019	(Indonesia)	distribution only; produced by mm2 Entertainment, Reflection Pictures, and Timeless Pictures	
More than Blue	November 27, 2019	(Taiwan)	distribution only; produced by mm2 Entertainment	
Extreme Job	December 11, 2019	(South Korea)	distribution only; produced by About Film and Haegrim Pictures	
The Last Full Measure (2019 film)	Early 2020	(United States)	distribution only; produced by Foresight Unlimited SSS Entertainment BCL Finance Group Boss Collaboration Lightbox Pictures Provocator	
Exit (2019 film)	January 2020	(South Korea)	distribution only; produced by CJ Entertainment	
Kill Chain	January 15, 2020	(United States)	distribution only; produced by CineTel Films, ETA Films, Killing Link Productions, Millennium Media, Old City SAS, Saturn Films	
A Score to Settle	January, 2020	(United States)	distribution only; produced by RLJE Films Saturn Films Ingenious Media	
The Informer	January 29, 2020	(United Kingdom)	distribution only; produced by Thunder Road Pictures and The Fyzz Facility	
The Room	February 5, 2020	(France)	distribution only; produced by Bidibul Productions, Les Films du Poisson, and Versus Production	
Kim Ji-young: Born 1982	February 12, 2020	(South Korea)	distribution only; produced by Lotte Cultureworks	
Night of the Undead (2020)	February, 2020	(South Korea)	distribution only; produced by TCO	
Howling Village	March 25, 2020	(Japan)	distribution only; produced by	
Endings, Beginnings	March, 2020	(United States)	distribution only; produced by CJ Entertainment Protagonist Pictures	
Secret Zoo	Mid October 2020	(South Korea)	distribution only; produced by Acemaker movieworks	
The Last Full Measure (2019 film)	Late 2020	(United States)	distribution only; produced by Foresight Unlimited	
Search and Destroy	Late 2020	(United States)	distribution only; produced by Millennium Media	
The Bay of Silence	Late 2020	(United Kingdom)	distribution only; produced by Silent Bay Productions Media Finance Capital Vigilant Entertainment	
Ghosts of War (2020 film)	Mid Season, 2020	(United States)	distribution only; produced by Vertical Entertainment, Highlands Film Group	
Seo Bok	April 18, 2021	(South Korea)	distribution only; produced by CJ Entertainment	
Steel Rain 2: Summit	2021	(South Korea)	distribution only; produced by Lotte Cultureworks	
Pawn (2020 film)	2021	(South Korea)	distribution only; produced by CJ Entertainment	
The Cursed: Dead Man's Prey	2021	(South Korea)	distribution only; produced by CJ Entertainment Studio Dragon	
Escape from Mogadishu	2021	(South Korea)	distribution only; produced by Lotte Entertainment	
Hide and Seek (2021 film)	Autumn 2021	(United States)	distribution only; produced Saban Films and CJ Entertainment	
Hitman’s Wife’s Bodyguard	March 9, 2022	(United States)	distribution only; produced by Millennium Media, Nu Boyana Film Studios, Campbell Grobman Films, Film i Väst, and FilmGate Films	
Emergency Declaration	August 31, 2022	(South Korea)	distribution only; produced by Showbox	
In Our Prime	September, 2022	(South Korea)	distribution only; produced by Showbox	
On the Line (2021 film)	September, 2022	(South Korea)	distribution only; produced by CJ Entertainment	
Confidential Assignment 2: International	October 12, 2022	(South Korea)	distribution only; produced by CJ Entertainment	
Project Wolf Hunting	January 25, 2023	(South Korea)	distribution only; produced by Contents Panda	
Maybe I Do	February 8, 2023	(United States)	distribution only; produced by Fifth Season	
80 for Brady	March 1, 2023	(United States)	distribution only; produced by Fifth Season and 199 Productions	
Winnie-The-Pooh: Blood and Honey	March 15, 2023	(United Kingdom)	distribution only; produced by Jagged Edge Productions	
One True Loves	April 19, 2023	(United States)	distribution only; produced by R.U. Robot, Highland Film Group, BuzzFeed Studios, Volition Media, Blue Rider Media, Thomasville Pictures	
Beautiful Disaster	April 26, 2023	(United States)	distribution only; produced by Voltage Pictures	
Soft & Quiet	August 2, 2023	(United States)	distribution with Momentum Pictures; produced by Blumhouse Productions	
Ransomed	August 9, 2023	(South Korea)	distribution only; produced by Showbox	
A Man of Reason	September 6, 2023	(South Korea)	distribution only; produced by Studio Take and Ace Maker Movie Works	
Expend4bles	September 20, 2023	(United States)	distribution only; produced by Millennium Media, Nu Boyana Film Studios, Campbell Grobman Films and Balboa Productions	
The Piper (2023)	November 1, 2023	(United States)	distribution only; produced by Millennium Media	
Hopeless (film)	December 6, 2023	(South Korea)	distribution only; produced by Megabox Plus M	
The Bricklayer	January 8, 2024	(United States)	distribution only; produced by Millennium Media	
Raging Grace	January 17, 2024	(United Kingdom)	distribution only; produced by Last Conker	
12.12: The Day	February 28, 2024	(South Korea)	distribution only; produced by Megabox Plus M	
Brave Citizen	March 6, 2024	(South Korea)	distribution only; produced by Studio N, Vol Media and Oscar 10 Studio	
Our Season	March 13, 2024	(South Korea)	distribution only; produced by Showbox	
Winnie-the-Pooh: Blood and Honey - Part Two	May 22, 2024	(United Kingdom)	distribution only; produced by ITN studios	
Train to Hell/Train to Death (Kereta Berdarah)	June 5, 2024	(Indonesia)	distribution only; produced by MVP Pictures	
Citizen of a Kind	July 3, 2024	(South Korea)	distribution only; produced by C-JeS Studios, Page One Film and Showbox	
Escape	July 17, 2024	(South Korea)	distribution only; produced by The Lamp Studio and Megabox Plus M	
Project Silence	August 7, 2024	(South Korea)	distribution only; produced by Blaad Studio and CJ ENM	
Vina: Before 7 Days	October 23, 2024	(Indonesia)	distribution only; produced by Dee Company	
The Thorn: One Sacred Light	October 30, 2024	(Indonesia)	distribution only; produced by MVP Pictures	
Kang Mak	November 20, 2024	(Indonesia)	distribution only; produced by Falcon Pictures	
Death Whisperer 2	January 22, 2025	(Thailand)	distribution only; produced by Major Joint Film and BEC World	
Peter Pan's Neverland Nightmare	February 5, 2025	(United Kingdom)	distribution only; produced by Jagged Edge Productions	
Firefighters	February 5, 2025	(South Korea)	distribution only; produced by Escroad Pictures, Ascendio, Osine Films	
Secret: Untold Melody	February 26, 2025	(South Korea)	distribution only; produced by Hive Media Corp., Higround, and Solaire Partners	
Island of Death (Pulau Hantu)	March 5, 2025	(Indonesia)	distribution only; produced by MVP Pictures	
Nocturnal	March 19, 2025	(South Korea)	distribution only; produced by Eulji Planning and Sanai Pictures	
Locked	April 2, 2025	(United States)	distribution only; produced by ZQ Entertainment and Raimi Productions	
Ateez World Tour (Towards The Light: Will To Power)	May 14, 2025	(South Korea)	distribution only; produced by CJ 4DLEX Trafalgar Entertainment and ScreenX Studio	
Don't Sleep	June 4, 2025	(Thailand)	distribution only; produced by Thongkham Films	
Mumu	June 11, 2025	(China)	distribution only; produced by CKF Pictures, Shanghai Tao Piao Piao Movie & TV Culture, and iQiyi Pictures	
6 Days	August 15, 2025	(South Korea)	distribution only; produced by MBC and Dejong Film	
Bambi: The Reckoning	August 27, 2025	(United Kingdom)	distribution only; produced by Jagged Edge Productions	
Midnight Sun	September 3, 2025	(South Korea)	distribution only; produced by K-Movie Studio and Geofilm	
Charlie the Wonderdog	October 24, 2025	(Poland)	distribution only; produced by Shea Wageman, Michael Balfry, and Carson Loveday	
G-Dragon In Cinema: Übermensch	October 29, 2025	(South Korea)	distribution only; produced by CJ ENM, CJ 4DPLEX, and ScreenX Studio	
The Pout-Pout Fish	January 1, 2026	(Australia)	distribution only; produced by Nadine Bates, Madeira Ginley, Kristen Souvlis, and Cyma Zarghami	
Death Whisperer 3	January 28, 2026	(Thailand)	distribution only; produced by Major Joint Film and BEC World	
The Informant	February 4, 2026	(South Korea)	distribution only; produced by Popcorn Films	
Giant	March 18, 2026	(United Kingdom) (United States)	distribution only; produced by Balboa Productions, AGC Studios, Tea Shop Productions, White Star Productions	
The Demon Prince	May 13, 2026	(Vietnam)	distribution only; produced by CJ HK Entertainment, HKFilm, and ProductionQ	
Pinocchio: Unstrung	July 22, 2026	(United Kingdom)	distribution only; produced Jagged Edge Productions	
