= Pag Oras Mo, Oras Mo Na =

Philippine action film

- Official movie poster
- Directed by: Augusto Salvador
- Written by: Humilde "Meek" Roxas
- Produced by: Vincent del Rosario III
- Starring: Phillip Salvador; Sunshine Cruz; Joko Diaz
- Cinematography: Rey de Leon
- Edited by: Renato de Leon
- Music by: Edwin Ortega
- Production company: RS Productions
- Distributed by: Viva Films
- Release date: April 22, 2000
- Running time: 120 minutes
- Country: Philippines
- Language: Filipino

Pag Oras Mo, Oras Mo Na (transl.When It's Your Time, It's Your Time) is a 2000 Philippine action film directed by Augusto Salvador. The film stars Phillip Salvador, Sunshine Cruz and Joko Diaz.

The film is streaming online on YouTube.

== Synopsis ==
A grief-stricken detective Capt. de Leon sank into depression and alcoholism after his son was fatally shot with bullets intended to kill him. He was framed for an assassination plot by the crime syndicate . Determined to clear his name, he met a brilliant lawyer, Attorney Montero who helped him with the investigation.

== Cast ==
Main cast

- Phillip Salvador as Capt. Victor de Leon
- Sunshine Cruz as Atty. Montero
- Joko Diaz as Ferrer

Supporting cast

- Ace Espinosa as Santos
- Chuck Perez as Marko
- Jun Aristorenas as Chief Francisco Salvador
- Mandy Ochoa as Dario
- Jaime Fabregas as Señor Sanchez
- Via Veloso as Miriam
- Sylvia Sanchez as Jean de Leon
- Emil Sandoval as Maceda
- Jimwell Stevens as Recto
- Bob Soler as Gen. Montero
- Rudy Meyer as Gen. Alarcon
- Rene Hawkins as Mang Pikong
- Cris Vertido as Chinese Drug Lord
- Edwin Reyes as Reyes
- Denver Razon as Elmer
- Mark Anthony Wilson as Junior de Leon
- Crisdor Perez as Eric
- Joanne Salazar as Nenita
- Ronald Asinas as Truck Driver
- Ronnie Francisco as Miriam's Lover
- Aurora Dalay as Eric's Yaya
- Marie Punzalan as Gen. Alarcon's Mistress
- Boy Gutierrez as Doctor
- Ed Aquino as Gen. Padilla
- Genaro Punzalan as Gen. Despa

== Production ==
The film had a working title Games of the Generals.
