= Maureen Larrazabal =

Filipino actress (born 1979)

- Born: Cebu City, Philippines
- Occupation: Actress
- Years active: 1999–present

Maureen Larrazabal is a Filipino actress, best known as a cast member of Bubble Gang (since 2013) and for her role as Mara in Pepito Manaloto (since 2013), both aired on GMA Network.

== Personal life ==
During the COVID-19 pandemic, Larrazabal experienced the symptoms of COVID-19 in the last week of July 2020. She underwent self-quarantine for three weeks and her symptoms subsided. However, she tested positive on a swab test on August 25. On September 19, she announced that she tested negative for the virus.

In 2025, Larrazabal revealed that she had previously went blind for two years after having slept without removing her contact lenses, which ended after she underwent a corneal transplant.

== Career ==
Before entering the film industry, Larrazabal appeared in television commercials for Condura Refrigerators, Skin Reborn, and Gilbeys Gin.

Larrazabal began her film career with roles in adult-themed films such as Ekis: Walang Tatakas (1999), Unfaithful Wife 2 (1999), Bulaklak ng Maynila (1999), Sugo ng Tondo (2000), and Blood Surf (2000). She was the weather girl, Carrie, in a comedy sitcom on the GMA Network titled Mikee Forever (1999). Other sitcoms including Iskul Bukol and Gags Must Be Crazy on Viva TV, Home Along Da Riles on ABS-CBN, and Bubble Gang (2013) on GMA Network. She is best known for her role as Mara in Pepito Manaloto: Ang Tunay na Kuwento, which she has played since 2013.

Larrazabal has been on the covers of some of the Philippines' men's magazines such as FHM Philippines and Maxim Philippines. In 2010, she was voted as FHM Top 25 Sexiest Women of the Decade in Philippines.

== Filmography ==
=== Film ===
Year	Title	Role
1999	Ekis: Walang Tatakas	Weng
1999	Unfaithful Wife 2	
1999	Bulaklak ng Maynila	Myrna
2000	Mana-mana Tiba-tiba	Menchie
2000	Juan & Ted: Wanted	Nurse Suzy
2000	Sugo ng Tondo	
2001	Blood Surf	Lemmya Lofranco
2009	Manila Kingpin	Herself
2011	My Valentine Girls	Korean Female Soldier

=== Television ===
Year	Title	Role	Note(s)
1999	Mikee Forever	Herself	
1999–2000	Liwanag ng Hatinggabi		
2000-2001	Home Along Da Riles		
2001	Kool Ka Lang	Maina	
2002–2013; 2017	Bubble Gang	Herself	
2002	Sana ay Ikaw na Nga	Pandora	
2003–2007	Lagot Ka, Isusumbong Kita	Tisay	
2004–2005	Forever in My Heart	Vicky Abrera	
2005	Mars Ravelo's Darna	Aio	
2005–2006	My Guardian Abby	Lucy	
2006	Gulong ng Palad	Khyna	
2006	Love to Love	Thalia	
2007	Bahay Mo Ba 'To?	Nicole	
2007	Sine Novela	Betty	Episode: "Pati Ba Pintig ng Puso"
2007–2008	Sine Novela	Bunny	Episode: "Pasan Ko ang Daigdig"
2007–2008	Carlo J. Caparas' Kamandag	Cathy	
2008	Ako si Kim Samsoon	Mau Timbol	
2009	Mars Ravelo's Darna	Dina Arcilla / Babaeng Bampira	
2009	Zorro	Bella	
2010	Ina, Kasusuklaman Ba Kita?	Teenage Alvina	
2010	Pilyang Kerubin	Azura	
2010	Jillian: Namamasko Po	Lizzie	
2013	Anna Karenina	Suzana "Suzie" Zamora	
2013–2014	Adarna	Jinky	
2013–present	Pepito Manaloto: Ang Tunay na Kwento	Mariano "Mara" Quijano	
2015	Karelasyon	Herself (various roles)	Episode role
2015	Healing Hearts	Kleng Samonte	
2017	Imbestigador	Mary Grace Paz	Episode role
2017	G.R.I.N.D.	Diana Perez	
2017	Encantadia	Lanzu	
2017	Imbestigador	Beth	Episode role
2017	Mulawin vs. Ravena	Belinda	
2017	Haplos	Mama Sol Españo	
2018	Kambal, Karibal	Madam Strong Beauty	
2019	TODA One I Love	Jane Magsino	
2019	The Better Woman	Ruby	
2019–2020	One of the Baes	Carmina Rivera-Biglangdapa	
2021	Wish Ko Lang!	Mildred	Episode: "Nilapa ng Aso"
2021	The Lost Recipe	Cherry Valencia	
2021	Wish Ko Lang!	Precy	Episode: "Maling Akala"
2021	Dear Uge	Madam Hussein	Episode: "Ampon ng Kadiliman"
2022	Artikulo 247	Pinky	
2023–2024	Black Rider	Kapitana Babylyn Hilario	
2025	Tadhana	Glenda	Episode: "Family Affairs"
2025	My Father's Wife	Susan	
