= Joko Diaz =

Filipino actor

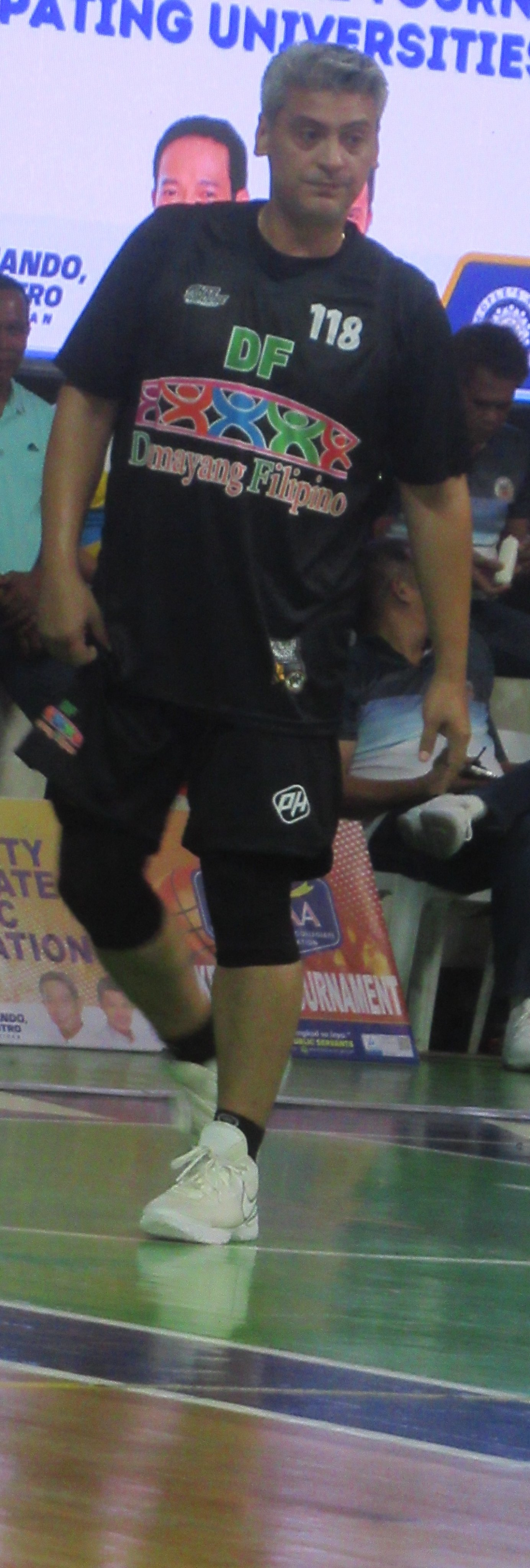
- Born: Francisco Gutierrez Diaz Jr. April 26, 1976 (age 50)
- Occupation: Actor
- Years active: 1984–present
- Agent: Viva Films
- Spouse: Abigail Diaz
- Children: 3
- Parent(s): Paquito Diaz (father); Nena Gutierrez (mother)
- Relatives: Cheska Diaz (sister); Romy Diaz (uncle); Kiko Estrada (nephew)

Francisco Gutierrez Diaz Jr. (born April 26, 1976), better known by his screen name Joko Diaz, is a Filipino actor. Throughout his career, he has won two FAP Awards and is three-time FAMAS Award nominee. He is best known for his antagonist and main villain portrayals and action movie lead roles.

== Early life and education ==
Diaz was born on April 26, 1976. He studied at the Adamson University.

== Acting career ==
Diaz began his acting career in 1984. In 1988, he became a talent of Viva Films, where he initially starred in teen comedy films, such as Estudyante Blues (1989) and Teacher's Enemy No. 1 (1990). He also had a special role in the 1988 film Boy Negro as the young titular character, in which he won as Best Child Performer in the 7th FAP Awards.

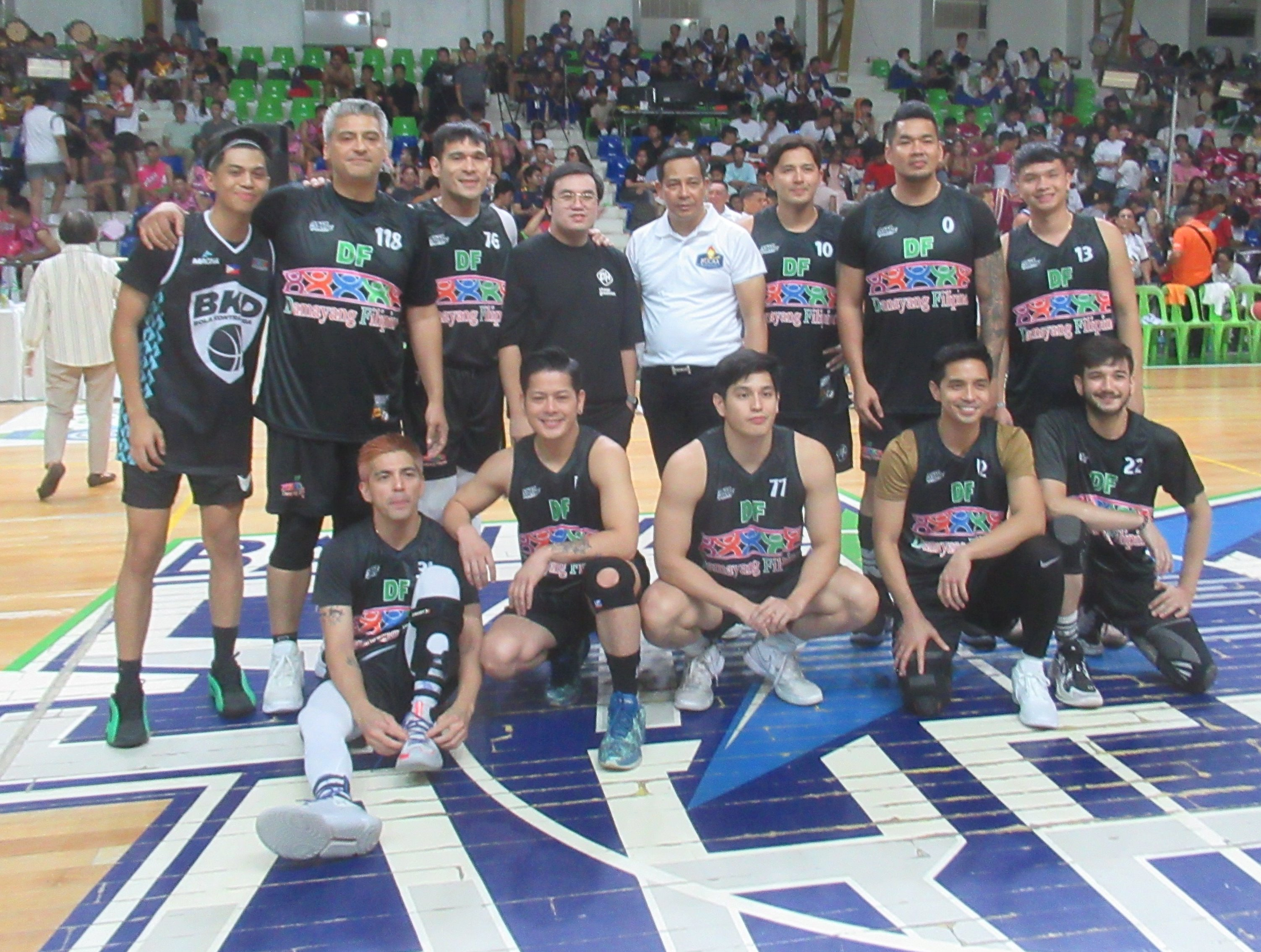
Diaz in BUCAA basketball tournament

In 1992, he was launched under Viva's action stable through Angelito San Miguel at ang Mga Batang City Jail and since bagged either co-lead or supporting roles in various action films, such as Blue Jeans Gang (1992), Pita (1993) and Brat Pack (1994). In 1995, he was launched into stardom with the biopic The Grepor Butch Belgica Story, where he portrayed the titular character. Since then, he became among the country's action stars at that time, bagging mostly lead roles in various action films, such as Masamang Damo (1996), Anak ni Boy Negro (1997), Squala (1998) and Sugo ng Tondo (2000).

Since 2009, he bags supporting roles in various TV series, notably villain roles.

Jeric Raval and Diaz, as one of the villains will be part of The Guardian (2024 film).

== Personal life ==
Diaz is married to his non-showbiz wife, Abigail, with whom he has two children: Ashley and Pacquie. He has another daughter, Nicole de Leon, from a previous relationship with actress Angelu de Leon.

He played a former high school basketball team of FEU-D Baby Tamaraws.

== Acting credits ==
=== Film ===
Key
| † | Denotes films that have not yet been released |

Joko Diaz's film credits with year of release, film titles and roles
| Year | Title | Role | Ref. |
|---|---|---|---|
| 1984 | Sigaw ng Katarungan | Bong | |
| 1984 | Basag ang Pula | Young Fernando | |
| 1984 | Idol | Child | |
| 1985 | Public Enemy No. 2: Maraming Number Two | Joko | |
| 1986 | Oras ng Kagitingan | Nestor Vargas Jr. | |
| 1988 | Boy Negro | Young Boy Negro | |
| 1988 | Kumander Bawang: Kalaban ng Mga Aswang | Kiko | |
| 1988 | Lorenzo Ruiz... The Saint... A Filipino! | Carlos Ruiz | |
| 1989 | Arrest: Pat. Rizal Alih – Zamboanga Massacre | | |
| 1989 | Mars Ravelo's Bondying: The Little Big Boy | Ronnie | |
| 1989 | Estudyante Blues | Bart | |
| 1989 | Dear Diary: Dear Killer | Bogs Quiroy | |
| 1990 | Titser's Enemi No. 1 | Goliath | |
| 1991 | Onyong Majikero | Kiko | |
| 1991 | Angelito San Miguel at ang Mga Batang City Jail | Erik | |
| 1992 | Jesus Dela Cruz at ang Mga Batang Riles | Chito | |
| 1992 | Dillinger | Berting | |
| 1992 | Andres Manambit: Angkan ng Matatapang | Tony Manambit | |
| 1993 | Pita, Terror ng Kalookan | Yoyong | |
| 1994 | Mistah | New Recruit | |
| 1994 | Bratpack (Mga Pambayad Atraso) | | |
| 1994 | The Untold Story: Vizconde Massacre II - May the Lord Be with Us! | Glen's Gang | |
| 1995 | Silakbo | Rudy | |
| 1995 | The Grepor Butch Belgica Story | Grepor "Butch" Belgica | |
| 1995 | Urban Rangers | Ding | |
| 1996 | Masamang Damo | Angel Sto. Domingo | |
| 1996 | Mahal Kita, Alam Mo Ba | Mario | |
| 1996 | Papunta Ka Pa Lang, Pabalik Na Ako | Jojo | |
| 1997 | Boy Chico: Hulihin si Ben Tumbling | Boy Chico | |
| 1997 | Anak ni Boy Negro | Nap | |
| 1998 | Ben Delubyo | Salem | |
| 1998 | Squala | Hudlo | |
| 1999 | Talahib at Rosas 2 | | |
| 1999 | Warat | | |
| 2000 | Pag Oras Mo, Oras Mo Na | Ferrer | |
| 2000 | Sagot Kita, Mula Ulo Hanggang Paa | Butch | |
| 2000 | Sugo ng Tondo | Lt. Rigor Dela Cruz | |
| 2001 | Mahal Kita... Kahit Sino Ka Pa! | Bingo Montano | |
| 2001 | Kapag Buhay ang Inutang... Buhay Din ang Kabayaran... | Daniel | |
| 2002 | Mga Batang Lansangan Ngayon | Jerry | |
| 2002 | D'Uragons | Grego | |
| 2002 | Masarap Pa sa Pugad | Burgos | |
| 2004 | Makamundo | Zaldo | |
| 2011 | Manila Kingpin: The Asiong Salonga Story | Pepeng Hapon | |
| 2012 | El Presidente | Procopio Bonifacio | |
| 2014 | Sa Ngalan ng Ama, Ina, at mga Anak | PNP leader | |
| 2015 | Manila's Finest | Brando | |
| 2017 | Carlo J. Caparas' Ang Panday | Cameo role | |
| 2018 | Jack Em Popoy: The Puliscredibles | Mr. Binuya | |
| 2019 | Bato (The General Ronald dela Rosa Story) | Terrorist | |
| 2019 | Mga Mata sa Dilim | Juancho | |
| 2022 | Siklo | Pastor Boy | |
| 2022 | Hugas | Dido | |
| 2022 | Kinsenas, Katapusan | Conardo | |
| 2022 | Sitio Diablo | Aplaon | |
| 2022 | Always | Ben | |
| 2022 | Kara Krus | Mayor | |
| 2023 | Hugot | Coach | |
| 2023 | Mary Cherry Chua | Oca Manzano | |
| 2023 | Litsoneras | Eloy | |
| 2023 | Manyak | Ken | |
| 2023 | Tuhog | Roldan | |
| 2024 | Sunny | | |
| 2024 | Praybeyt Benjamin 3 | Mr. Diaz | |
| 2025 | Minamahal | | |

=== Television ===
| † | Denotes shows that have not yet been aired |

Joko Diaz's television credits with year of release, title(s) and role
| Year | Title | Role | Notes | Ref. |
|---|---|---|---|---|
| 1998 | Ganyan Kita Kamahal | —N/a | | |
| 2008 | Obra: Rehas | Nitoy | | |
| 2010–2011 | Bantatay | Kanor | | |
| 2010–2011 | My Driver Sweet Lover | Agent Castro | | |
| 2011 | Mars Ravelo's Captain Barbell | Bong | | |
| 2011–2012 | Ikaw Lang ang Mamahalin | Berto | | |
| 2011–2012 | Glamorosa | Hernandez | | |
| 2012–2013 | Kahit Puso'y Masugatan | Eric | | |
| 2013 | Little Champ | Jose | | |
| 2013 | Mga Basang Sisiw | Tony | | |
| 2013 | Magpakailanman | Conard | Episode: "Hinagpis ng Isang Ina: The Rape of an Autistic Child" | |
| 2013 | Indio | Governador-General | | |
| 2014 | Magpakailanman | Jude | Episode: "Krimen sa Ngalan ng Puri" | |
| 2014–2015 | Ang Lihim ni Annasandra | Jose "Emong" | 54 episodes | |
| 2015 | Magpakailanman | Nestor | Episode: "Ang Bunga ng Nakaraan: The Nestor Jasm Boller Story" | |
| 2015 | Let the Love Begin | Enrico Potenciano | | |
| 2015 | Magpakailanman | Jonard | Episode: "Anak ni Mister, Kabit ni Misis" | |
| 2015–2016 | Destiny Rose | Joselito "Lito" Vergara, Sr. | | |
| 2016 | Magpakailanman | Bong | Episode: "Anak sa Mundo ng Droga" | |
| 2016 | Once Again | Lukas Carbonnel† | | |
| 2016–2017 | Alyas Robin Hood | Ramon Arguelles | | |
| 2017 | Magpakailanman | Sinon Loresca Sr. | Episode: "Ang Rampa ng Buhay Ko: The Sinon Loresca Jr. Story" | |
| 2017 | Mulawin vs. Ravena | Antonio De Leon | | |
| 2017 | Magpakailanman | Roland | Episode: "Mga Sikreto ng Aking Pamilya" | |
| 2017–2018 | FPJ's Ang Probinsyano | Mateo F. De Silva† | | |
| 2018–2020 | Kadenang Ginto | Andro Domingo† / Hector Mangubat† | | |
| 2019 | Sino ang May Sala?: Mea Culpa | Ernesto Miranda | | |
| 2019 | Maynila: Life Begins at 40 | Gil | | |
| 2020–2021 | Walang Hanggang Paalam | Nestor Elardo† | | |
| 2021–2022 | Marry Me, Marry You | Aljo Nikolas Justiniano | | |
| 2022 | It's Showtime | Himself | | |
| 2022 | Flower of Evil | Baldo Ongkiko† | | |
| 2022–2023 | Mars Ravelo's Darna | Hergis / Master Klaudio | | |
| 2023–2024 | Nag-aapoy Na Damdamin | Dr. Joaquin Eduardo D. Serrano | | |
| 2024 | Lumuhod Ka sa Lupa | Abraham "Abra" Espiritu† | | |
| 2024 | Pamilya Sagrado | Diego Salvacion† | | |
| 2024–2025 | Walang Matigas Na Pulis sa Matinik Na Misis | Diego† | | |
| 2025 | Ang Mutya ng Section E | Kaizer Watson | Episode: "Meeting the Father" | |
| 2025 | Incognito | Enrique "Lion" Agno† | Episodes: "Brand New Day" "Tropic Storm" "Storage" "Home" | |
| 2025 | Sins of the Father | Roldan Rivera | | |
| 2025 | Bad Genius | —N/a | | |
| 2025–2026 | Totoy Bato | Alan Monte† | | |
| 2026 | Sigabo | Melchor Umali | | |
