= Sugo ng Tondo =

Philippine action film

- Directed by: Jose "Kaka" Balagtas
- Written by: Jose "Kaka" Balagtas
- Produced by: Vincent del Rosario III
- Starring: Joko Diaz
- Cinematography: Claro Gonzales
- Edited by: Rene Tala
- Music by: Willie Yusi
- Production company: Viva Films
- Distributed by: Viva Films
- Release date: December 15, 2000
- Running time: 95 minutes
- Country: Philippines
- Language: Filipino

Sugo ng Tondo is a 2000 Philippine action film written and directed by Jose "Kaka" Balagtas. The film stars Joko Diaz in the title role.

The film is streaming online on YouTube.

== Cast ==
- Joko Diaz as Lt. Rigor dela Cruz
- Patricia Javier as Jenny
- Raymond Bagatsing as Lambert
- Maureen Larrazabal as Jenny
- Rommel Montano as Sgt. Montano
- Ernie Zarate as Col. Roberto Nebres
- Cris Daluz as Mang Dado
- Boy Roque as Fred
- Christian Alvear as Balong
- Jhoana Tan as Lisa
- Masuro Samba as Alden
- Levi Ignacio as Nelson
- Mike Vergel as David
