= The Grepor Butch Belgica Story =

Philippine action film

- Directed by: Toto Natividad
- Screenplay by: Butch Belgica; Ferdinand Galang
- Based on: From Darkness to Light by Butch Belgica
- Produced by: William C. Leary
- Starring: Joko Diaz
- Cinematography: Carding Herrera
- Edited by: Toto Natividad; Joyce Bernal
- Music by: Jaime Fabregas
- Production company: Viva Films
- Distributed by: Viva Films
- Release date: June 21, 1995
- Running time: 110 minutes
- Country: Philippines
- Language: Filipino

The Grepor Butch Belgica Story (also known as The Butch Belgica Story) is a 1995 Filipino biographical action film co-edited directed by Toto Natividad. The film stars Joko Diaz as Butch Belgica, the country’s most notorious delinquent during the Marcos administration. It was one of the entries in the 1995 Manila Film Festival.

The film was streaming online on YouTube but has been removed as of February 2026.

== Cast ==
- Joko Diaz as Grepor "Butch" Belgica
  - Johannes Belgica as Young Butch
- Ronaldo Valdez as Don Porfirio Belgica
- Boots Anson-Roa as Butch's Mother
- Albert Martinez as Ruben Umali
- Gary Estrada as Boy
- Kier Legaspi as Jaime
- Richard Bonnin as Lito "Tolits" Zuzuarregi
- Rommel Montano as Bingbong
- Ferdinand Galang as Butch's Friend
- Gino Ilustre as Butch's Friend
- Raul Flores as Butch's Friend
- Ara Mina as Babes
- Cristina Gonzales as Lindy
- Isabel Granada as Caroline
- Vina Morales as Dr. Carmelita "Meth" Banta
- Rufa Mae Quinto as Shirley
- Shintaro Valdez as Jun Belgica
- Rez Cortez as Benjo
- Daniel Fernando as Boy del Pan
- Gene Padilla as Butch's Enemy
- Carlos David as Butch's Enemy
- Roel de Villa as Butch's Enemy
- Mon Esguerra as Butch's Enemy
- Allan Garcia as Butch's Enemy
- Bembol Roco as Enemy in Jail
- Kate Yasay as Butch's Sister
- Angelica del Carmen as Butch's Sister
- Emma Moran as Butch's Sister
- Lucky Kristine Garcia as Butch's Sister
- Ama Quiambao as Judge
- Roldan Aquino as Capatas
- Gamaliel Viray as Mayor
- Danny Labra as Capatas' Man
- Jimmy Reyes as Capatas' Man
- Polly Cadsawan as OS Agent
- Elmer Jamias as OS Agent
- Jun De Guzman as OS Agent
- Johnny Vicar as Bert
- Cesar Iglesia as Asst. Director, Muntinlupa
- Pocholo Montes as Attorney
- Telly Babasa as Bembol's Man
- Ronald Montes as Bembol's Man
- Leo Lazaro as BMI
- Bong Gatus as BMI
- Alex Toledo as BMI
- Michael Nicor as BMI
- Romy Romulo as Butch's Friend in Jail
- Nemy Gutierrez as Butch's Friend in Jail
- Cris Daluz as National Artist
- Olive Madridejos as Dra. Alcantara
- Nanding Fernandez as Speaker

== Production ==
Grepor "Butch" Belgica brought in the idea for his biopic in 1985 with Rudy Fernandez tapped to portray him. Vic del Rosario Jr. of Viva Films stated at that time that he was interested in Belgica's story. It was only in 1991 when the project was revived, with Paquito Diaz reminding Belgica and a successful negotiation with del Rosario Jr. about it. With Fernandez being too old to portray him, Belgica chose Paquito's son Joko to portray him. This marked Joko's first major role after a string of supporting and co-lead roles in action films. Belgica co-wrote the screenplay with Ferdinand Galang.
