= Ekis (film) =

1999 Filipino film

- Film poster
- Directed by: Erik Matti
- Screenplay by: Erik Matti; Jet Orbida; Checcs Osmeña
- Story by: Erik Matti; Mark Querubin
- Produced by: Vincent del Rosario III; Veronique del Rosario-Corpus
- Starring: Sunshine Cruz; Albert Martinez
- Cinematography: Rolly Manuel
- Edited by: Danny Gloria
- Music by: Jaime Fabregas
- Production company: Viva Films
- Distributed by: Viva Films
- Release date: July 28, 1999
- Running time: 110 minutes
- Country: Philippines
- Language: Filipino

Ekis is a 1999 Philippine crime drama film co-written and directed by Erik Matti. The film stars Sunshine Cruz and Albert Martinez.

== Plot ==
A battered wife and her lover, whom she doesn't know was actually a kidnapper, want to start a new life together. Things go wrong when the police bust the ransom payoff and the wife, caught by her husband packing, kills her husband during a fight that ensues.

== Cast ==
- Albert Martinez as Gene
- Sunshine Cruz as Dolor
- Raymond Bagatsing as Roger
- Ace Espinosa as Alvaro
- Jaime Fabregas as Eliseo
- Ryan Eigenmann as Emman
- John Arceo as Pitong
- J.J. Chua as Winston
- John Arcilla as George
- Soliman Cruz as Manny
- Romeo Vasquez as Major Duterte
- William Martinez as Nilo
- Bert Martinez as Director Felizario
- Maureen Larrazabal as Weng
- Susan Enriquez as News Reporter
- Mel Kimura as Truding
- Rey Solo as SPO1 Han Solo
- Steve Salvador as Self
- Nonoy Torrente as Blindman
- Matt Fajardo as Man with Dog
