= Papunta Ka Pa Lang, Pabalik Na Ako =

Philippine action comedy film

- Directed by: Jun Aristorenas
- Written by: Humilde "Meek" Roxas; Jun Aristorenas
- Produced by: William Leary
- Starring: Eddie Garcia; Joko Diaz
- Cinematography: Ver Dauz
- Edited by: Rene Tala
- Music by: Nonong Buencamino
- Production companies: Viva Films; EG Productions
- Distributed by: Viva Films
- Release date: July 11, 1996
- Running time: 105 minutes
- Country: Philippines
- Language: Filipino

Papunta Ka Pa Lang, Pabalik Na Ako is a 1996 Philippine action comedy film co-written and directed by Jun Aristorenas. The film stars Eddie Garcia and Joko Diaz.

The film is streaming online on YouTube.

== Plot ==
Jojo (Diaz), a rookie policeman, competes with Gaston (Gracia), a veteran policeman, in arresting criminals and gets the ire of the latter for being in a relationship with his daughter Maricar (Sevilla). However, they decide to set aside their differences after being assigned to track down a notorious Drugload (Cepeda).

== Cast ==
- Eddie Garcia as Gaston
- Joko Diaz as Jojo
- Jennifer Sevilla as Maricar
- Glydel Mercado as Maira
- Ricardo Cepeda as Drug lord
- Amado Cortez as Amurao
- Michelle Parton as Drug lord's Girlfriend
- Danny Ramos as Rapist
- Rufa Mae Quinto as Rape Victim
- Paquito Diaz as Domeng
- Berting Labra as Gaston's Informer
- Ernie Zarate as Maira's Father
- Turko Cervantes as Burloloy
- Danny Labra as Jojo's Informer
- Robert Miller as Jojo's Informer
- Junar Aristorenas as Scalawag Policeman
- Angel Baldomar as Scalawag Policeman
- Gino Ilustre as Scalawag Policeman
- Mia Gutierrez as Gaston's Wife
- Arvin Cuanes as Maricar's Brother
- Jenalyn Mercado as Maricar's Sister
- Precious Valencia as Rape Victim's Friend
- Alex Cunanan as Badong
- Jerry Gonzales as Priest
