= Mary Cherry Chua =

2023 horror film directed by Roni Benaid

- Theatrical release poster
- Directed by: Roni Benaid
- Written by: Roni Benaid
- Produced by: Vincent Del Rosario III; Valerie S. Del Rosario; Veronique Del Rosario-Corpus
- Starring: Ashley Diaz; Joko Diaz; Lyca Gairanod; Kokoy De Santos; Alma Moreno
- Cinematography: Hector Calma
- Edited by: Lourence Carale; Lawrence Fajardo
- Music by: Cyril Jeru Cruz
- Production companies: Studio Viva; Viva Films
- Distributed by: Viva Films
- Release date: July 19, 2023 (Philippines)
- Running time: 120 minutes
- Country: Philippines
- Language: Filipino

Mary Cherry Chua is a 2023 Philippine supernatural horror thriller film written and directed by Roni Benaid. It stars Joko Diaz, Lyca Gairanod, Kokoy De Santos, Alma Moreno and Ashley Diaz in her first lead role. The film is based on a popular urban legend about a pretty high school lass named Mary Cherry Chua, who was reportedly raped and murdered by the school janitor. The horror film centers on Karen (Ashley Diaz), who is fond of reading campus horror tales and urban legends.

== Plot ==
Mary Cherry Chua was a student back in the 60s from Regina Caeli Academy, a prestigious school. A cheerful young girl with long black hair, Mary Cherry Chua has it all she's beautiful, rich, and smart. She is adored and envied by many and is known as their school's Miss Popular. But her seemingly perfect life is cut short when she is found lifeless on their campus grounds and declared to have been raped and murdered.

In 1995, Karen, a high school student who enjoys reading horror stories and urban legends, is so intrigued about Mary Cherry Chua's life that she decides to re-open the case to do a little investigation of her own and further strengthen the evidence about the crime.

With the help of her friends and classmates, Karen gets new information about the case. But as she digs deeper, looking for the truth, it seems that she may have also been digging her own grave after she uncovers something that could endanger her own life.

== Cast ==
- Ashley Diaz as Karen Dimaranan
- Joko Diaz as Mr. Manzano
- Abby Bautista as Mary Cherry Chua
- Lyca Gairanod as Faith
- Kokoy De Santos as Paco Martinez
- Alma Moreno as Ms. Estrella
- Krissha Viaje as Lena Dimaranan
- Migo Valid as Oca
- Rolando Inocencio as Emilio Baldonado
- Cherrylyn David as Mrs. Wong
- Maria Riya Miranda as Mrs. Liwanag
- Elia Ilano as Student

== Release ==
The film was released in the Philippines on July 19, 2023, by Viva Films. It was released alongside Oppenheimer and Barbie.

== Production ==
The filming started on October 1, 2022, and was finished in October 29 of the same year. The school Regina Caeli Academy, which served as the main setting of the film was filmed in Sacred Heart Academy of Novaliches, Quezon City.

== Reception ==
Fred Hawson of ABS-CBNnews.com gave the film 5/10 rating and wrote: There was only one ghost in the whole film, so effort had to be made to vary the ways how Mary Cherry would haunt Karen, with varying success. This led to plot holes (why haunt someone who is trying to help, instead of the perpetrator?), some simply led nowhere (what happened after the induced heart attack?).

Mario Bautista of Journal News praised the acting of the actors and actresses and he added: As a movie that aims to frighten the audience, “Mary Cherry Chua” is very commercial and has no pretensions. It has its usual share of jump scares that made the audience gasp and scream when we watched it in its premiere night at SM The Block.

Sandy Cagurangan of Random Republika gave the film a positive review and she wrote: Prepare to be enthralled by the heart-pounding jumpscares that will keep you at the edge of your seat in Mary Cherry Chua. With Ashley Diaz's exceptional debut performance, she delivers her role with astounding potential, while the rest of the cast skillfully portray their characters, adding depth to the film.
