= 35th Luna Awards =

2017 Philippine film awards ceremony

- Date: August 26, 2017
- Site: Resorts World Manila, Pasay

Highlights
- Best Picture: Die Beautiful
- Most awards: Die Beautiful (5)

The 35th Luna Awards ceremony, presented by the Film Academy of the Philippines (FAP), honored the best Filipino films of 2016. It took place on August 26, 2017 at Resorts World Manila in Pasay, Philippines.

== Winners and nominees ==
=== Awards ===
Winners are listed first, highlighted in boldface.

Best Picture	Best Direction
**Die Beautiful – Regal Films, Idea First Co., and October Train Films**; Ang Hapis at Himagsik ni Hermano Puli; Dukot; Ignacio de Loyola; Ma’ Rosa; Pamilya Ordinaryo; Saving Sally; Vince & Kath & James	**Jun Lana – Die Beautiful**; Brillante Mendoza – Ma’ Rosa; Eduardo W. Roy, Jr. – Pamilya Ordinaryo; Gil Portes – Ang Hapis at Himagsik ni Hermano Puli; Paolo Dy – Ignacio de Loyola; Paul Soriano – Dukot
Best Actor	Best Actress
**Bembol Roco – Pauwi Na**; Aljur Abrenica – Ang Hapis at Himagsik ni Hermano Puli; Joshua Garcia – Vince & Kath & James; Paolo Ballesteros – Die Beautiful; Ronwaldo Martin – Pamilya Ordinaryo	**Hasmine Kilip – Pamilya Ordinaryo**; Angeli Bayani – Ned’s Project; Cherry Pie Picache – Pauwi Na; Jaclyn Jose – Ma’ Rosa; Jaclyn Jose – Patay na si Hesus; Julia Barretto – Vince & Kath & James; Meryll Soriano – Pauwi Na
Best Supporting Actor	Best Supporting Actress
**Christian Bables – Die Beautiful**; Jerald Napoles – Pauwi Na; Ricky Davao – Dukot; Ronnie Alonte – Seklusyon	**Chai Fonacier – Patay na si Hesus**; Andi Eigenmann – Ma’ Rosa; Barbie Forteza – Tuos; Gladys Reyes – Die Beautiful; Lotlot de Leon – Mrs.; Shaina Magdayao – Dukot
Best Screenplay	Best Cinematography
**Die Beautiful – Rody Vera**; Ignacio de Loyola – Paolo Dy; Ma’ Rosa – Troy Espiritu; Pamilya Ordinaryo – Eduardo W. Roy, Jr.; Saving Sally – Charlene Sawit-Esguerra and Carlo Ledesma; Vince & Kath & James – Daisy Cayanan, Kim Noromor, and Anjanette Haw	**Ignacio de Loyola –** **Lee Briones-Meily**; Ang Hapis at Himagsik ni Hermano Puli – Albert Banzon; Die Beautiful – Carlo Mendoza; Pauwi Na – Sasha Palomares; Saving Sally – Odyssey Flores and Rommel Sales; Tuos – Mycko David
Best Production Design	Best Editing
**Ignacio de Loyola –** **Leo Velasco Jr.**; Ned’s Project – John Paul Sapitula; Saving Sally – Romel Laquian and Erik Manalo; Seklusyon – Erikson Navarro; Tuos – Steff Derej	**Die Beautiful –** **Benjamin Gonzales Tolentino**; Ang Hapis at Himagsik ni Hermano Puli – George Jarlego; Ignacio de Loyola – Sheryll Lopez; Seklusyon – Jay Halili; Vince & Kath & James – Beng Bandong
Best Musical Score	Best Sound
**Ignacio de Loyola – Ryan Cayabyab**; Ang Hapis at Himagsik ni Hermano Puli – Tonton Africa and Francis de Veyra; Die Beautiful – Richard Gonzales; Patay na si Hesus – Francis de Veyra; Seklusyon – Francis de Veyra; Vince & Kath & James – Jessie Lasaten	**Ignacio de Loyola –** **Albert Michael Idioma**; Ang Hapis at Himagsik ni Hermano Puli – Mark Laccay; Die Beautiful – Bebet Casas, Jr. and Armand de Guzman; Saving Sally – Joshua Cantillon and Mikko Quizon; Seklusyon – Lamberto Casas, Jr. and Albert Michael Idioma; Vince & Kath & James – Aurel Claro Bilbao

=== Special awards ===
The following honorary awards were also awarded.

- Golden Reel Award – Eddie Garcia
- Fernando Poe Jr. Lifetime Achievement Award – Herbert Bautista
- Manuel de Leon Award for Exemplary Achievements – Des Bautista and Bibsy Carballo
- Lamberto Avellana Memorial Award – Mario O’Hara and Lolita Rodriguez, (posthumous)
- Awards of Appreciation – Lav Diaz and Charo Santos
