= Metro Manila Film Festival Award for Best Supporting Actor =

Award presented annually by the Metropolitan Manila Development Authority (MMDA)

Metro Manila Film Festival Award for Best Actor
- Awarded for: Best Performance by an Actor in a Supporting Role
- Country: Philippines
- Presented by: MMDA
- First award: 1975
- Currently held by: Tom Rodriguez, Unmarry (2025)
- Website: www.mmda.gov.ph/mmff/

The Metro Manila Film Festival Award for Best Supporting Actor is an award presented annually by the Metropolitan Manila Development Authority (MMDA). It was first awarded at the 1st Metro Manila Film Festival ceremony, held in 1975; Vic Silayan received the award for his role in Diligan Mo ng Hamog ang Uhaw na Lupa and it is given in honor of an actor who has delivered an outstanding performance in a supporting role while working within the film industry. Currently, nominees and winners are determined by Executive Committees, headed by the Metropolitan Manila Development Authority Chairman and key members of the film industry.

== Winners and nominees ==
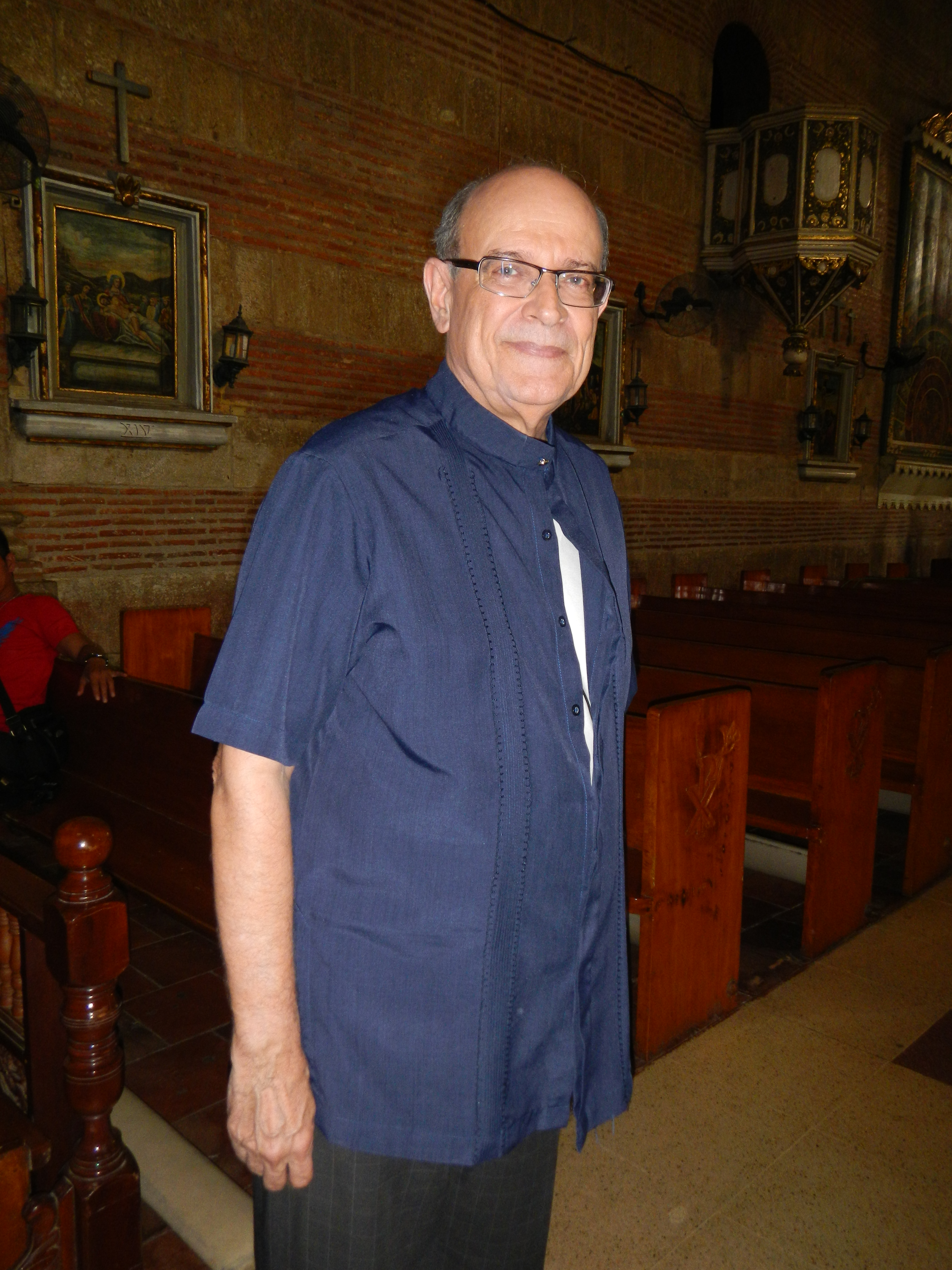
Jaime Fabregas won in 1998 for his role in José Rizal.

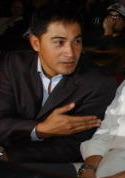
Cesar Montano won several "Best Supporting Actor" Awards including his first win in 1989 for his performance in Ang Bukas ay Akin.

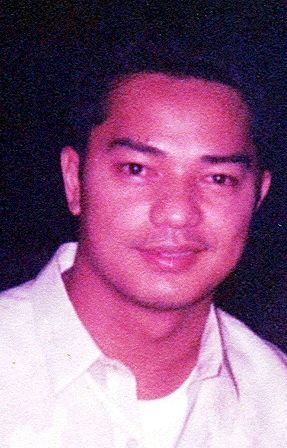
Ariel Rivera won in 1992 for his role in Bakit Labis Kitang Mahal.

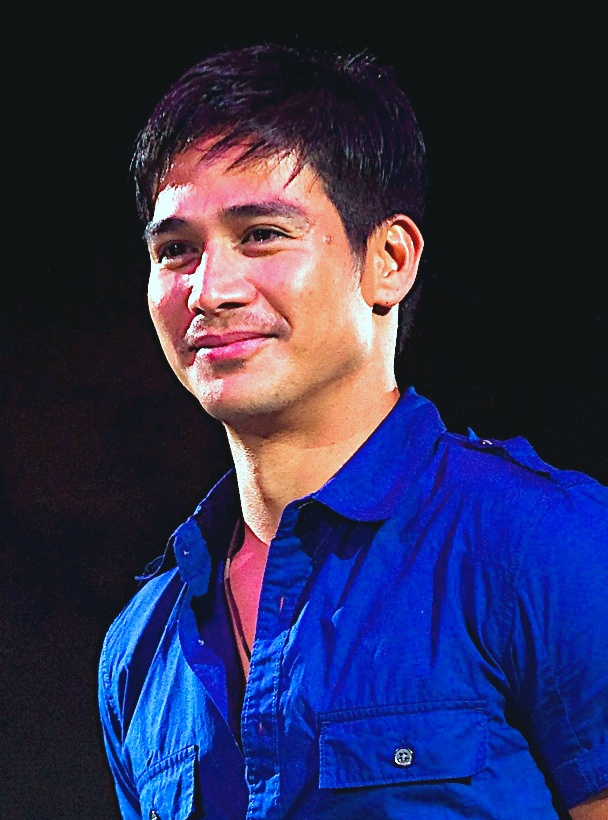
Piolo Pascual won in 2002 for his supporting acting role in Dekada '70.

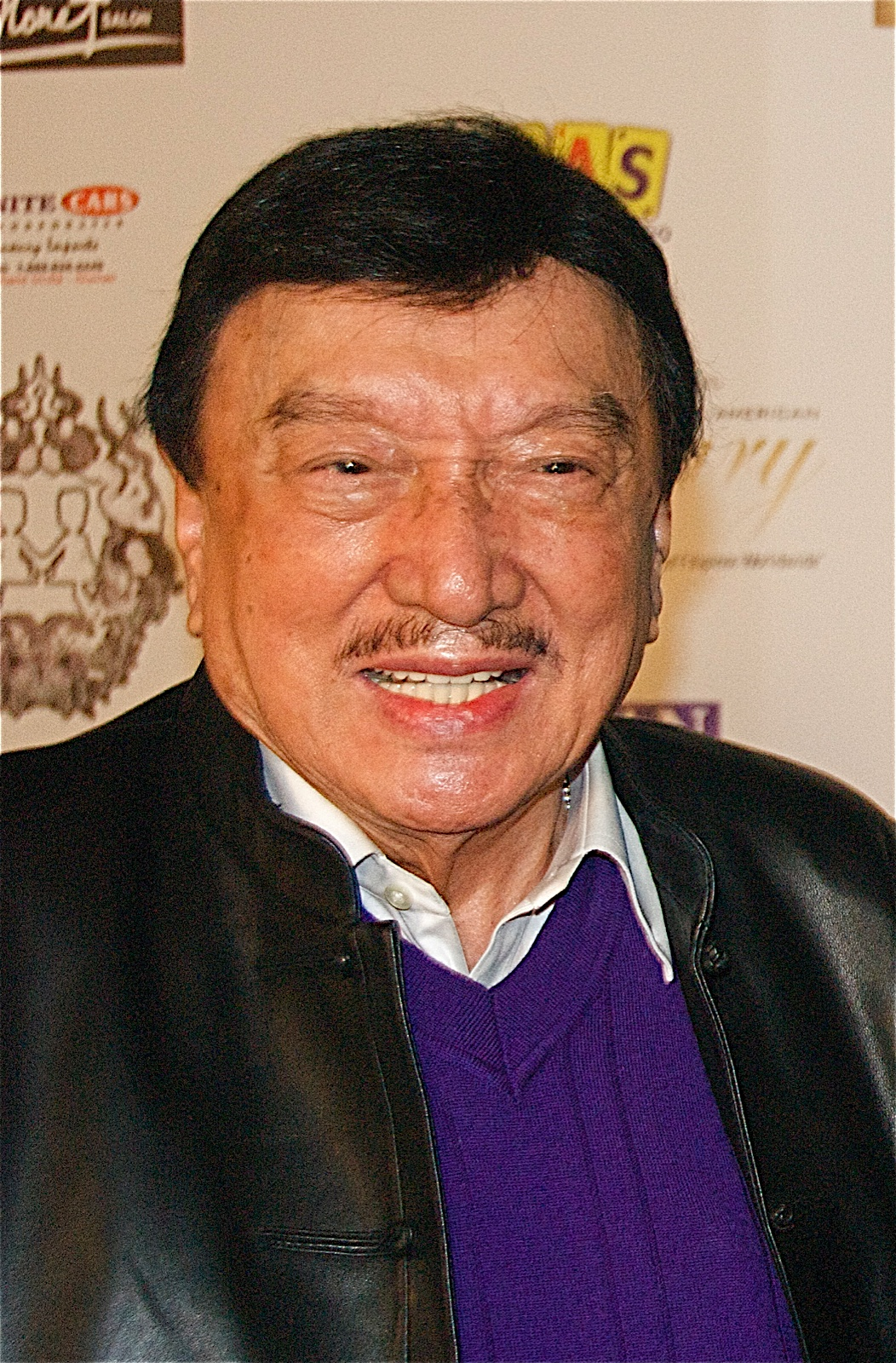
Dolphy won in 2010 for his role in Rosario

Key	Explanation
‡	Indicates the winning supporting actor

=== 1970s ===
Year	Actor	Film	Role	Ref
1975 (1st)	Vic Silayan‡	Diligan Mo ng Hamog ang Uhaw na Lupa		
1976 (2nd)	Ruel Vernal‡	Insiang	Dado	
1977 (3rd)	Joonee Gamboa ‡	Burlesk Queen	Louie	
1978 (4th)	None (Note: Only the "Best Performer" award was given.)			
1979 (5th)	Johnny Delgado‡	Ang Alamat ni Julian Makabayan		

=== 1980s ===
Year	Actor	Film	Role	Ref
1980 (6th)	None (Note: Only the "Best Actor" and "Best Actress" awards were given.)			
1981 (7th)	Jay Ilagan‡	Kisapmata	Noel Manalansan	
1982 (8th)	Spanky Manikan‡	Himala	Orly	
1983 (9th)	Dennis Roldan‡	Hot Property		
1984 (10th)	Tom Olivar‡	Bulaklak sa City Jail	Paquito	
1985 (11th)	Tommy Abuel‡	The Moises Padilla Story		
1986 (12th)	Christopher Ad. Castillo‡	Bagets Gang		
1987 (13th)	Roderick Paulate‡	(1 + 1 = 12 + 1)		
1988 (14th)	Dick Israel‡	Patrolman		
1989 (15th)	Cesar Montano‡	Ang Bukas ay Akin	Predo	

=== 1990s ===
Year	Actor	Film	Role	Ref
1990 (16th)	Robert Arevalo‡	Ama, Bakit Mo Ako Pinabayaan?		
1991 (17th)	Leo Martinez‡	Juan Tamad at Mr. Shooli: Mongolian Barbecue	Manhik-Manaog	
1992 (18th)	Ariel Rivera‡	Bakit Labis Kitang Mahal	David	
1993 (19th)	Ronaldo Valdez‡	May Minamahal	Cenon	
1994 (20th)	Dick Israel‡	Kanto Boy 2: Anak ni Totoy Guwapo	Benjie	
1995 (21st)	Albert Martinez‡	Muling Umawit ang Puso	Miguel Sanchez	
1996 (22nd)	John Arcilla‡	Mulanay		
1997 (23rd)	Ronaldo Valdez‡	Nasaan ang Puso?	Edgardo de Luna	
1998 (24th)	Jaime Fabregas‡	José Rizal	Luis Taviel de Andrade	
1999 (25th)	Pen Medina‡	Muro-ami	Dado	

=== 2000s ===
Year	Actor	Film	Role	Ref
2000 (26th)	Jeffrey Quizon‡	Markova: Comfort Gay	Young Markova	
2001 (27th)	Ronnie Lazaro‡	Bagong Buwan	Datu Ali	
2002 (28th)	Piolo Pascual‡	Dekada '70	Julian "Jules" Bartolome, Jr.	
2003 (29th)	Victor Neri‡	Filipinas	Emman Filipinas	
2004 (30th)	Dennis Trillo‡	Aishite Imasu 1941: Mahal Kita	Ignacio Basa/ Inya	
2005 (31st)	Jose Manalo‡	Enteng Kabisote: OK Ka Fairy Ko... The Legend	Jose	
2006 (32nd)	Johnny Delgado‡	Ligalig	Damian	
2007 (33rd)	Roi Vinzon‡	Resiklo	Hades	
2008 (34th)	Phillip Salvador‡	Baler	Daniel Reyes	
2009 (35th)	Phillip Salvador‡	Ang Panday	Lizardo	
2009 (35th)	John Lapus	Shake, Rattle & Roll 11	Basti	

=== 2010s ===
Year	Actor	Film	Role	Ref
2010 (36th)	Dolphy‡	Rosario	Elder Hesus	
2010 (36th)	Roy Alvarez	Father Jejemon		
2010 (36th)	Alwyn Uytingco	Ang Tanging Ina Mo (Last na 'To!)	Peter Tirso "Pip" Montecillo	
2010 (36th)	Sid Lucero	Rosario	Carding	
2011 (37th)	John Regala‡	Manila Kingpin: The Asiong Salonga Story	Carlos "Totoy Golem" Capistrano	
2011 (37th)	Baron Geisler	Manila Kingpin: The Asiong Salonga Story	Ernesto "Erning Toothpick" Reyes	
2011 (37th)	Dennis Trillo	Yesterday, Today, Tomorrow	Derek	
2011 (37th)	Jose Manalo	Enteng ng Ina Mo	Bodyguard Jose	
2012 (38th)	Cesar Montano‡	El Presidente	Andrés Bonifacio	
2012 (38th)	Zanjoe Marudo	One More Try	Tristan	
2013 (39th)	Pen Medina‡	10,000 Hours	Sebastian Jago	
2013 (39th)	Cholo Barretto	10,000 Hours	Benjo Alcaraz	
2013 (39th)	Janus del Prado	Pagpag: Siyam na Buhay	Dencio	
2013 (39th)	Baron Geisler	Boy Golden: Shoot to Kill	Datu Putla	
2013 (39th)	Christian Vasquez	Pedro Calungsod: Batang Martir	Padre Diego Luis de San Vitores	
2013 (39th)	Michael de Mesa	10,000 Hours	Dir. Dante Cristobal	
2014 (40th)	Joey Marquez‡	Kubot: The Aswang Chronicles	Nestor	
2015 (41st)	Tirso Cruz III‡	Honor Thy Father	Bishop Tony	
2016 (42nd)	Christian Bables‡	Die Beautiful	Barbs	
2016 (42nd)	Cedrick Juan	Oro	Bong	
2016 (42nd)	Joel Torre	Ang Babae sa Septic Tank 2: #ForeverIsNotEnough	Joel Torre	
2016 (42nd)	Lou Veloso	Seklusyon	Sandoval	
2017 (43rd)	Edgar Allan Guzman‡	Deadma Walking	Mark	
2017 (43rd)	Nonie Buencamino	Ang Larawan	Manolo	
2017 (43rd)	Sandino Martin	Ang Larawan	Bitoy Camacho	
2017 (43rd)	Jake Cuenca	Ang Panday	Lucifer	
2017 (43rd)	Robert Arevalo	Ang Larawan	Don Perico	
2018 (44th)	Tony Mabesa‡	Rainbow's Sunset	Fredo	
2019 (45th)	Joem Bascon‡	Write About Love	Marco	
2019 (45th)	Soliman Cruz	Miracle in Cell No. 7	Tatang Celso	
2019 (45th)	JC Santos	Sunod	Lance	

=== 2020s ===
Year	Actor	Film	Role	Ref
2020 (46th)	Michael de Mesa‡	Isa Pang Bahaghari	Rey	
2020 (46th)	Edgar Allan Guzman	Coming Home	Ned	
2020 (46th)	Zanjoe Marudo	Isa Pang Bahaghari	Andy	
2020 (46th)	John Leinard Ramos	The Boy Foretold by the Stars	Timmy	
2020 (46th)	Dante Rivero	Suarez: The Healing Priest	Bishop Antonio Palang	
2021 (47th)	John Arcilla‡	Big Night!	Donato Rapido	
2021 (47th)	John Arcilla	A Hard Day	Ace	
2021 (47th)	Nico Antonio	Big Night!	Zues	
2022 (48th)	Mon Confiado ‡	Nanahimik ang Gabi	Plays the antagonist of the film	
2022 (48th)	Nonie Buencamino	Family Matters	Kiko	
2022 (48th)	Sean de Guzman	My Father, Myself	Matthew	
2023 (49th)	JC Santos ‡	Mallari	Brother Lucas Alarcon Segundo	
2023 (49th)	Romnick Sarmenta	Becky & Badette	Pepe Feniz	
2023 (49th)	Dingdong Dantes	Firefly	Tonton	
2023 (49th)	Epi Quizon	Firefly	Louie	
2023 (49th)	Enchong Dee	GomBurZa	Jacinto Zamora	
2023 (49th)	Dante Rivero	GomBurZa	Mariano Gomez	
2023 (49th)	Pepe Herrera	Rewind	Lods	
2023 (49th)	Tommy Alejandrino	Mallari	Didi Laan	
2024 (50th)	Ruru Madrid ‡	Green Bones	Xavier Gonzaga	
2024 (50th)	Sid Lucero	Topakk	Romero	
2024 (50th)	Sid Lucero	The Kingdom	Magat Bagwis	
2024 (50th)	Jhong Hilario	And the Breadwinner Is...	Biboy Salvador	
2024 (50th)	Kokoy de Santos	And the Breadwinner Is...	Boy Salvador	
2024 (50th)	David Ezra	Isang Himala	Orly	
2025 (51st)	Tom Rodriguez ‡	Unmarry		
2025 (51st)	Will Ashley	Bar Boys: After School		
2025 (51st)	Joey Marquez	I'mPerfect		
2025 (51st)	Zaijian Jaranilla	I'mPerfect		
2025 (51st)	Cedrick Juan	Manila's Finest		
2025 (51st)	Zack Sibug	Unmarry		

== Multiple awards for Best Supporting Actor ==
Throughout the history of Metro Manila Film Festival (MMFF), there have been actors who received multiple Awards for Best Supporting Actor. As of 2021 (47th MMFF), 7 actors have received two or more Best Supporting Actor awards.

Actor	Record Set	First year awarded	Recent year awarded
Pen Medina	2	1999	2013
Cesar Montano	2	1989	2012
Phillip Salvador	2	2008	2009
Johnny Delgado	2	1979	2006
Ronaldo Valdez	2	1993	1997
Dick Israel	2	1988	1994
John Arcilla	2	1996	2021
