= 33rd PMPC Star Awards for Movies =

2017 Philippine Movie Press Club awards

33rd Star Awards for Movies
- Date: September 3, 2017
- Hosted by: Aljur Abrenica; Yassi Pressman; Daniel Matsunaga; Alex Gonzaga; Robi Domingo
- Produced by: Philippine Movie Press Club; Airtime Marketing Philippines
- Directed by: Bert de Leon

Highlights
- Best Picture: Die Beautiful (Mainstream); Pamilya Ordinaryo (Indie)
- Most awards: Die Beautiful (5) (Mainstream); Pamilya Ordinaryo (4) (Indie)
- Most nominations: Barcelona: A Love Untold and Everything About Her (Mainstream) (11)

Television coverage
- Network: ABS-CBN
- Duration: 2 hours

The 33rd PMPC Star Awards for Movies, was organized by the Philippine Movie Press Club (PMPC) and recognizes the best films and filmmakers for the past year. The awards night was held on September 3, 2017 at the Newport Performing Arts Theater, Resorts World Manila, Pasay and aired on ABS-CBN.

The awards night was hosted by Aljur Abrenica, Yassi Pressman, Daniel Matsunaga, Alex Gonzaga, and Robi Domingo with opening numbers performed by Christian Bautista featuring Isay Alvarez, Sam Concepcion, Edgar Allan Guzman featuring Darren Espanto. While the dance number was performed by Ciara Sotto, Jon Lucas, Maris Racal, Sofia Andres, Grae Fernandez and Zeus Collins.

Die Beautiful won big, bagged five awards, including Best Director, Best Picture, Best Cinematographer, Best Editor, and Best Screenwriter. Another highlight of the night was when screen legends Vilma Santos and Nora Aunor shared the top honor of Best Actress and young actor Daniel Padilla hailed as Best Actor.

== Winners and Nominees ==
These are the nominations list (in alphabetical order) for the awarding ceremony. (period of nomination: Films that have been shown from January to December 2016). Winners are listed first and highlighted with boldface.

=== Major categories ===
Movie of the Year (Mainstream)	Movie of the Year (Indie)
Winner: **Die Beautiful** (Regal Entertainment and The IdeaFirst Company): Barcelona: A Love Untold (Star Cinema); Camp Sawi (Viva Films); Dukot (TEN17P Films and Star Cinema); Everything About Her (Star Cinema); Imagine You and Me (GMA Films, APT Entertainment, MZET TV Production); Seklusyon (Reality Entertainment); The Unmarried Wife (Star Cinema); Whistleblower (Unitel Productions and Quento Media)	Winner: **Pamilya Ordinaryo**: Ang Babaeng Humayo (Cinema One Originals and Sine Olivia Pilipinas); Kabisera (Firestarters Productions); Kusina (Cinemalaya Foundation and Cinematografica Films); Ma’Rosa (Center Stage Productions); Paglipay (Universal Harvester and ZMD Productions); Patay na si Hesus (T-Rex Entertainment, Epicmedia, Above The Line, and Moira Lang); Pauwi Na (Universal Harvester and Pollen Productions); Tibak, The Story of Kabataang Makabayan (Blank Pages Productions); 1st Sem (Cine Filipino, Unitel Productions, TC Entertainment, and Kayan Film Productions)
Movie Director of the Year (Mainstream)	Movie Director of the Year (Indie)
Winner: **Jun Robles Lana** (Die Beautiful): Adolfo Borinaga Alix Jr. (Whistleblower); Joyce Bernal (Everything About Her); Maryo J. Delos Reyes (The Unmarried Wife); Olivia Lamasan (Barcelona); Jun Robles Lana (Die Beautiful); Erik Matti (Seklusyon); Paul Soriano (Dukot); Michael Tuviera (Imagine You And Me); Irene Emma Villamor (Camp Sawi)	Winner: **Eduardo Ro** (Pamilya Ordinaryo): David Corpuz and Cenón Obispo Palomares (Kusina); Arlyn Dela Cruz (Tibak, The Story of Kabataang Makabayan); Lav Diaz (Ang Babaeng Humayo); Zig Dulay (Paglipay); Real Florido and Arturo San Agustin (Kabisera); Dexter Paglinawan Hemedez and Allan Michael Ibanez (1st Sem); Brillante Mendoza (Ma’Rosa); Eduardo Roy Jr. (Pamilya Ordinaryo); Paolo Villaluna (Pauwi Na); Victor Kaiba Villanueva (Patay Na Si Hesus)
Movie Actor of the Year	Movie Actress of the Year
Winner: **Daniel Padilla** (Barcelona: A Love Untold): Tommy Abuel (Dagsin); Paolo Ballesteros (Die Beautiful); John Lloyd Cruz (Just The 3 Of Us); Dingdong Dantes (The Unmarried Wife); JC De Vera (Best Partee Ever); Ronwaldo Martin (Pamilya Ordinaryo); Zanjoe Marudo (The Third Party); Alden Richards (Imagine You And Me); Bembol Roco (Pauwi Na)	Winner: **Vilma Santos** (Everything About Her) and **Nora Aunor** (Kabisera) (Tied): Kathryn Bernardo (Barcelona); Janice De Belen (Ringgo, The Dog Shooter); Lotlot De Leon (1st Sem); Jaclyn Jose (Ma’Rosa); Hasmine Killip (Pamilya Ordinaryo); Angel Locsin (Everything About Her); Charo Santos (Ang Babaeng Humayo); Judy Ann Santos (Kusina)
Movie Supporting Actor of the Year	Movie Supporting Actress of the Year
Winner: **Xian Lim** (Everything About Her): Christian Bables (Die Beautiful); Paolo Ballesteros (Bakit Lahat ng Gwapo may Boyfriend?); John Lloyd Cruz (Ang Babaeng Humayo); Ricky Davao (Dukot); Christopher De Leon (The Escort); Bembol Roco (Ringgo, The Dog Shooter); Joel Torre (Tisay)	Winner: **Ana Capri** (Laut): Mercedes Cabral (Oro); Ana Capri (Laut); Liza Diño-Seguerra (Ringgo, The Dog Shooter); Chai Fonacier (Patay Na Si Hesus); Angelica Panganiban (Whistleblower); Cherry Pie Picache (Whistleblower); Gloria Sevilla (Kusina); Meryll Soriano (Pauwi Na)
New Movie Actor of the Year	New Movie Actress of the Year
Winner: **Joshua Garcia** (Vince & Kath & James): Ronnie Alonte (Vince And Kath And James); Christian Bables (Die Beautiful); Jameson Blake (2 Cool 2 Be 4gotten); Awra Briguela (Super Parental Guardians); Michael Pangilinan (Pare, Mahal Mo Raw Ako); Onyok Pineda (Super Parental Guardians); Darwin Yu (1st Sem)	Winner: **Hasmine Killip** (Pamilya Ordinaryo): Marion Aunor (Tibak, The Story of Kabataang Makabayan); Gabbi Garcia (Laut); Micah Oteyza (Ringgo, The Dog Shooter); Issa Pressman (Camp Sawi); Arra San Agustin (Kabisera); Natileigh Sitoy (Lily); Laila Ulao (Women Of The Weeping River)
Movie Child Performer of the Year
Winner: **Rhed Bustamante** (Seklusyon): Awra Briguela (Super Parental Guardians); Alfonso Yñigo Delen (Pitong Kabang Palay); Chunsa Jung (Just The 3 Of Us); Bon Andrew Lentejas (Pamilya Ordinaryo); Lei Navarro (The Unmarried Wife); Onyok Pineda (Super Parental Guardians); David Remo (Pilapil)

=== Technical categories ===
Movie Screenwriter of the Year (Mainstream)	Movie Screenwriter of the Year (Indie)
Winner: **Rody Vera** (Die Beautiful): Froilan Medina (Dukot); Senedy Que (The Escort); Carmi Raymundo and Olivia Lamasan (Barcelona); Anton Santamaria (Seklusyon); Vanessa Valdez (The Unmarried Wife); Rody Vera (Whistleblower); Irene Emma Villamor (Everything About Her)	Winner: **Fatrick Tabada** and **Moira Lang** (Patay Na Si Hesus): Arlyn Dela Cruz (Tibak, The Story of Kabataang Makabayan); Zig Dulay (Paglipay); Troy Espiritu (Ma’Rosa); Dexter Hemedez and Allan Ibañez (1st Sem); Cenon Obispo Palomares (Kusina); Enrique Ramos (Ang Hapis At Himagsik Ni Hermano Puli); Eduardo Roy, Jr. (Pamilya Ordinaryo)
Movie Cinematographer of the Year (Mainstream)	Movie Cinematographer of the Year (Indie)
Winner: **Carlo Mendoza** (Die Beautiful): Neil Bion (Seklusyon); Tey Clamor (Camp Sawi); Hermann Claravall (Barcelona); Mycko David and Odyssey Flores (Dukot); Lee Briones-Meily and Sherman Philip So (The Escort); Shayne Sarte (Everything About Her); Shayne Sarte (Imagine You And Me)	Winner: **Ice Idanan** (Sakaling Di Makarating): Ruel Dahis Antipuesto (Patay Na Si Hesus); Albert Banzon (Paglipay); Albert Banzon (Pamilya Ordinaryo); Neil Daza (1st Sem); Odyssey Flores (Ma’Rosa); Topel Lee (Kabisera); Sasha Palomares (Pauwi Na)
Movie Production Designer of the Year (Mainstream)	Movie Production Designer of the Year (Indie)
Winner: **Ericson Navarro** (Seklusyon): Winston Acuyong (The Unmarried Wife); Candy Reyes-Alipio (Imagine You And Me); Angel Diesta (Die Beautiful); Joey Luna (Everything About Her); Shari Marie Montiague (Barcelona); Gerry Santos (The Escort); Gerry Santos (Whistleblower)	Winner: **Arthur Nicdao** (Ang Hapis At Himagsik Ni Hermano Puli): Harley Alcasid (Pamilya Ordinaryo); Marxie Maolen Fadul (Pauwi Na); Cyrus Khan (Dagsin); Dante Mendoza (Ma’Rosa); Ericson Navarro (Kusina); Aped Santos (Paglipay); Aped Santos (Patay Na Si Hesus)
Movie Editor of the Year (Mainstream)	Movie Editor of the Year (Indie)
Winner: **Benjamin Tolentino** (Die Beautiful): Chrisel Galeno-Desuasido and Joyce Bernal (Camp Sawi); Jay Halili (Seklusyon); Marya Ignacio (Barcelona); Marya Ignacio (Everything About Her); Tara Illenberger (The Unmarried Wife); Ike Veneracion and Aleks Castañeda (Whistleblower); Mark Victor (Dukot)	Winner: **Carlo Francisco Manatad** (Pamilya Ordinaryo): Diego Dobles (Ma’Rosa); JD Domingo (Patay Na Si Hesus); Zig Dulay (Paglipay); Tara Illenberger (Kabisera); Carlo Francisco Manatad (Ringgo, The Dog Shooter); Benjamin Tolentino (Oro); Paolo Villaluna and Ellen Ramos (Pauwi Na)
Movie Musical Scorer of the Year (Mainstream)	Movie Musical Scorer of the Year (Indie)
Winner: **Carmina Cuya** (Everything About Her): Cesar Francis Concio (Barcelona); Francis De Veyra (Seklusyon); Robbie Factoran, Ricardo Jugo, and Mark Villar (Dukot); Richard Gonzales (Die Beautiful); Richard Gonzales and Jay Dominguez (Imagine You And Me); Jessie Lasaten (Whistleblower); Jesse Lucas (The Unmarried Wife)	Winner: Teresa Barrozo (Ma’Rosa); Francis De Veyra (Patay Na Si Hesus); Francis De Veyra and Tonton Africa (Ang Hapis At Himagsik Ni Hermano Puli); Erwin Fajardo (Pamilya Ordinaryo); Gian Gianan (Paglipay); Toni Muñoz (Kusina); Karl Ramirez (Tibak, The Story of Kabataang Makabayan); Pike Ramirez, Paolo Villaluna, and Veena Ramirez (Pauwi Na)
Movie Sound Engineer of the Year (Mainstream)	Movie Sound Engineer of the Year (Indie)
Winner: **lbert Michael Idioma** and **Bebet Casas** (Seklusyon): Aurel Claro Bilbao (Barcelona); Aurel Claro Bilbao (Everything About Her); Joshua Cantillon, Jason Conanan, Kimberly Ocampo (Dukot); Armand De Guzman and Lamberto Casas, Jr. (Die Beautiful); Arnel Labayo (The Unmarried Wife); Alexander Red (Whistleblower); Alex Tomboc (The Escort)	Winner: **Raffy Magsaysay** (Kusina): Jess Carlos (Oro); Corinne De San Jose (Ang Babaeng Humayo); Albert Michael Idioma (Ma’Rosa); Albert Michael Idioma and Immanuel Verona (Pamilya Ordinaryo); Andrew Millalos (Paglipay); Andrew Millalos (Pauwi Na); Nicholas Varela, Mark Laccay, and Mikko Quizon (Patay Na Si Hesus)
Movie Original Theme Song of the Year (Mainstream)	Movie Original Theme Song of the Year (Indie)
Winner: **"Imagine You and Me"** (Imagine You And Me) – lyrics by Nicomaine Mendoza, music by Marivic Sotto, music arrangement by Jimmy Antiporda, interpreted by Alden Richards and Maine Mendoza: "Bumibigay" (Bakit Lahat Ng Guwapo May Boyfriend?) – lyrics by Nica Del Rosario, music by Nica Del Rosario and Jumbo De Belen, interpreted by Shevoyz; "Dominus Miserere" (Seklusyon) – composed and arranged by Francis De Veyra, interpreted by Emma Rose Almario, Amanda Nicole Pugeda, and Joseph James Doak; "Malaya" (Camp Sawi) -- composed, arranged, and interpreted by Moira Dela Torre	Winner: **"Panata"** – lyrics by Zig Dulay, composed by Gian Gianan, interpreted by Alessandra de Rossi (Bambanti): "Liwanag Ng Iyong Halaga" – music and lyrics by Jethro Tenorio and Maynard de Guzman; interpreted by Christian Bautista (Filemon Mamon); "Love’s Melody" - lyrics by Celine Marie Flores, music by Nonong Buencamino, interpreted by Jay Marquez (Old Skool); "Walang Hanggan" – composed and interpreted by Quest (Ang Kwento Nating Dalawa); "Young Again: – composed, arranged, and interpreted by Armi Millare (Apocalypse Child)

== Special awards ==
Darling of the Press	Movie Loveteam of the Year
Winner: Luis Manzano: Harlene Bautista; Kim Chiu; KC Concepcion; Kaye Dacer; Xian Lim; Piolo Pascual; Regine Tolentino	Winner: Kathryn Bernardo and Daniel Padilla (Barcelona: A Love Untold): Maine Mendoza and Alden Richards (Imagine You And Me); Nadine Lustre and James Reid (This Time); Julia Barretto and Ronnie Alonte (Vince And Kath And James); Julia Barretto and Joshua Garcia (Vince And Kath And James); Jodi Sta. Maria and Ian Veneracion (Achy Breaky Heart); Jodi Sta. Maria and Richard Yap (Achy Breaky Heart)

- Nora Aunor Ulirang Artista Lifetime Achievement Award - Pen Medina
- Ulirang Alagad ng Pelikula sa Likod ng Kamera Lifetime Achievement Award - Joel Lamangan

== Rundown ==
Note: Except special awards.

=== Mainstream ===
Film	Winners	Nominees
Barcelona: A Love Untold	11	2
Everything About Her	11	

=== Indie ===
Film	Winners	Nominees
Bambanti	5	12
Silong	2	10
Tandem	1	8
I Love You, Thank You	1	8
Apocalypse Child	1	6
Anino sa Likod ng Buwan	1	5

== See also ==
- List of Philippine films of 2016
