= Joel Torre =

Filipino actor (born 1961)

- Torre in 2026
- Born: José Rizalino de León Torre; June 19, 1961 (age 65); Bacolod, Negros Occidental, Philippines
- Occupations: Actor; restaurateur
- Years active: 1978–present
- Spouse: Christy Azcona (m. 1990)
- Children: 2

José Rizalino "Joel" de León Torre (Tagalog: [hoˈse ɾisaˈlino de leˈon ˈtoɾe]; born June 19, 1961) is a Filipino actor. He began performing on stage at age seven and rose to fame in the 1980s for his roles in period and historical drama, including Oro, Plata, Mata (1982), Karnal (1983), and José Rizal (1998). His accolades include a Puchon International Fantastic Film Festival Award, three Gawad Urian, and a FAMAS Award.

== Early life and education ==
José Rizalino de León Torre was born on June 19, 1961, and hailed from Bacolod. He is the son of Alfonso Obregon Torre and Luz de Leon Diaz. Torre began performing in theater at the age of seven, performing with the Masskara theater group in Bacolod, which was overseen by director Peque Gallaga.

Torre studied at the University of St. La Salle in Bacolod.

== Early career ==
At age seven, Torre was a member of the Bacolod-based Masskara theater group ran by director Peque Gallaga, where his passion for acting started. He was the youngest member in the group which composed of 13 people. He then played a small role in Lino Brocka's Gumising ka, Maruja which was shot in Bacolod in 1978. A few years later, Gallaga tasked Torre to play a role for his 1982 film Oro, Plata, Mata. In 1990, Torre starred in the action drama Kunin Mo Ang Ulo ni Ismael, based on the radio drama by Rey Langit serialized in DZRH. The film reportedly earned over ₱12 million in Metro Manila.

In 2024, Torre was cast in the 2024 regional Bacolod film, Under A Piaya Moon.

== Personal life ==
Torre's middle name, Rizalino, comes from the fact that he was born exactly 100 years after the Filipino national hero José Rizal. Torre married Christy Azcona in 1990. They have two daughters, Maria "Aila" Ariela and Maria "Marela" Raphaela.

In 2003, Torres and his wife founded JT's Manukan Grille in Quezon City. It offers Bacolod-style chicken inasal, a native dish of his. Currently, it has 35 branches in the country.

In 2024, Philippines AirAsia partnered with Torre's JT's Manukan Grille to offer Bacolod chicken inasal in-flight. It also opened its first overseas restaurant in Lucky Plaza, Singapore.

== Filmography ==
=== Film ===
Year	Title	Role	Notes	Ref.
1978	Wake Up, Maruja	Joel		
1982	Oro, Plata, Mata	Miguel Lorenzo		
1983	Init sa Magdamag	Armand Javier		
1983	Karnal	Goryo	9th Metro Manila Film Festival entry	
1984	Hindi Mo Ako Kayang Tapakan	Rollan Tuazon		
1984	Bagets 2	Special Sabet		
1984	Shake, Rattle & Roll	Johnny/Juanito	Segment: Baso	
1985	Bituing Walang Ningning	Garry Diaz		
1985	Isla	Sonny		
1985	Beware: Bed Sins			
1986	Unfaithful Wife	Fidel		
1986	Bagong Hari	Rex		
1986	The Graduates			
1986	I Love You Mama, I Love You Papa	Gilbert		
1986	Evelio		Television movie	
1986	Bilanggo sa Dilim	Lito/Eddie		
1987	Once Upon a Time	Prinsipeng Bakal		
1987	Susuko Ba Ako, Inay?			
1987	Olongapo... The Great American Dream	Joel		
1988	Hiwaga sa Balete Drive	Peter/Uncle Paul	Segment: "Ikatlong Mata"	
1988	Isusumbong kita sa Diyos			
1988	Arturo Lualhati			
1988	Magkano ang Iyong Dangal?	Larry		
1989	Anak ng Demonyo	Padre Damian		
1990	Kunin Mo ang Ulo ni Ismael	Johnny Jorge		
1990	Kasalanan ang Buhayin Ka	Digs		
1990	Mana sa Ina	Rodel Sevilla		
1990	Machete: Istatwang Buhay	Eddie Boy		
1991	Umiyak Pati Langit	Anthony		
1991	McBain	Chauffeur		
1991	Shake, Rattle & Roll III	Milton	Segment: "Ate"	
1992	Okay Ka, Fairy Ko! Part 2	Jose Rizal	18th Metro Manila Film Festival entry	
1993	Pandoy: Alalay ng Panday	Redentor		
1993	Maricris Sioson: Japayuki	Alvin		
1993	Leonardo Delos Reyes: Alyas Waway	Tasan		
1994	Tunay na magkaibigan, walang iwanan... peksman	Hector		
1994	Comfort Women: A Cry for Justice	Fernando		
1994	Lipa 'Arandia' Massacre: Lord, Deliver Us from Evil	Ronald Arandia		
1994	Asian Cop: High Voltage	Billy		
1995	Eskapo	Jorge Cabardo		
1995	The Lilian Velez Story: Till Death Do Us Part	Joe Climaco		
1995	Bocaue Pagoda Tragedy	Fr. Joe		
1995	Redeem Her Honor	Daniel		
1995	Victim No. 1: Delia Maga (Jesus, Pray for Us!)	Conrado Maga		
1995	Rollerboys	Ernest		
1996	Sana Naman	Pilo		
1996	Tirad Pass: The Last Stand of Gen. Gregorio del Pilar	Emilio Aguinaldo		
1996	Mumbaki	Dr. Felix Lorenzo		
1996	DNA	Taka		
1996	Nasaan Ka nang Kailangan Kita	Bobby		
1997	Nakaw Na Sandali	Edward Romualdo		
1997	Milagros	Junie		
1997	Puerto Princesa	Legal Adviser		
1997	Wala Na Bang Pag-ibig?	Ambo		
1997	Ilaban Mo, Bayan Ko: The Obet Pagdanganan Story	Gov. Obet Pagdanganan		
1998	Berdugo	Jimmy		
1998	Masikip, Masakit, Mahapdi	Pablo		
1998	José Rizal	Crisostomo Ibarra/Simoun		
1999	Seventeen	Emong		
1999	Hubad sa Ilalim ng Buwan	Lauro Paharon		
1999	Kiss Mo 'Ko	Bart Mallari		
1999	Esperanza: The Movie	Raul Estrera		
2000	Bayaning 3rd World	Jose Rizal		
2000	Anak	Rudy		
2000	Tanging Yaman	Francis		
2000	Spirit Warriors	Roman		
2001	Taxi ni Pilo	Pilo		
2001	Batang West Side	Juan Mijares		
2002	Utang ni Tatang	Mike		
2002	Singsing ni Lola	Fidel		
2003	Sanib	Armando		
2003	Abong: Small Home	Lamot		
2003	My First Romance	Dante	Segment: "Two Hearts"	
2003	Chavit	Sotero		
2003	Ang Kapitbahay	Nicanor		
2004	Kuya	Jill's Pa		
2004	Evolution of a Filipino Family	Mayor		
2004	Panaghoy sa Suba	Damian		
2004	Lastikman: Unang Banat	Pablo		
2005	Boso	Imbestigador 1		
2005	Camiling Story	Indios Bravos		
2005	Say That You Love Me	Gabriel		
2005	Ang Anak ni Brocka			
2005	Rigodon	Dante		
2005	Beneath the Cogon	Dr. Karl Augusto		
2005	Hari ng Sablay: Isang Tama, Sampung Mali	Rodel		
2006	Umaaraw, Umuulan	Paolo's Dad		
2006	Ina, Anak, Pamilya			
2007	The Promise	Gustin		
2007	Baliw	Pablo Fernandez		
2007	Ataul: For Rent	Guido/Guidote Alejo		
2007	Green Paradise	Ronaldo		
2008	Ploning	Old Siloy		
2008	Namets!	Caveman		
2008	Yanggaw	Dulpo		
2008	Baler	Commandante Teodorico Luna Novicio		
2009	Surviving Evil	Joey		
2009	Sabungero	Paco		
2010	Amigo	Rafael Dacanay		
2010	In Your Eyes	Ronnie Delos Santos		
2011	Le Marquis	Le Commandant Du SWAT		
2011	Deep Gold 3D	Ranulfo Sanchez		
2011	Subject: I Love You	Marlon		
2011	Flight of an Angel	Guardian Angel		
2011	Siglo ng Pagluluwal	Amang Tiburcio	Cinemanila International Film Festival entry	
2012	Captive			
2012	The Healing	Melchor		
2012	The Bourne Legacy	Citrus Samaritan		
2012	Just One Summer	Daniel Cuaresma Sr.		
2012	Pridyider	Mr. Benitez		
2012	A Secret Affair	Jimmy		
2012	Huling Biyahe (2012)	Kasamahan 2/Direk Joe		
2012	Mariposa: Sa Hawla ng Gabi	Primo		
2013	On the Job	Mario 'Tatang' Maghari		
2013	Juana C. the Movie			
2013	The Diplomat Hotel			
2013	Kabisera	Andres		
2014	Ibong Adarna: The Pinoy Adventure	Sultan Mabait		
2015	Felix Manalo	Teofilo Ramos		
2016	Just the 3 of Us	Arturo Manalo		
2017	Northern Lights: A Journey to Love	Kado		
2018	Jacqueline Comes Home	Dionisio		
2019	Miracle in Cell No. 7	Soliman/Boss Sol		
2020	Circle of Bones	Realtor		
2021	Barumbadings	Mother Joy		
2021	On the Job: The Missing 8	Mario 'Tatang' Maghari		
2022	Ikaw Lang Ang Mahal	Butch Alipato		
2023	Moro	Bapa Hamid		
2024	Under a Piaya Moon	Lolo Poldo		
2024	Lolo and the Kid	Lolo		
2024	Outside	Arturo		
2024	And the Breadwinner Is...	Popshie Salvador (Bambi's father)	Special participation, 50th Metro Manila Film Festival entry	
2025	Samahan ng mga Makasalanan	Father Danny		
2025	Isolated	Peter Coleman		
2025	Everyone Knows Every Juan	Roel Sevilla		
2026	A Special Memory			

=== Television / digital series ===
Year	Title	Role
1989	Balintataw	
1991	Cebu	
1993	Noli Me Tángere	Crisostomo Ibarra
1995	Villa Quintana	Robert Quintana
1997–1999	Esperanza	Raul Estrera
1998	Wansapanataym: Chemistry	
1999	Saan Ka Man Naroroon	Juanito Ocampo
2001	Sa Puso Ko Iingatan Ka	Franco Dequiros Montecillo
2001	Maalaala Mo Kaya: Ambu Bag	Ted
2002–2004	Kapalaran	Cesar Arman
2003	A LEGACY OF HEROES: The Story of Bataan and Corregidor	Himself
2003–2004	Sana'y Wala Nang Wakas	Anton Garcia
2004	Marina	Elias Sto. Domingo
2005	Now and Forever: Mukha	Guido
2006	Gulong ng Palad	Tomas Santos
2006	Maalaala Mo Kaya: Poon	Jun
2007	Mga Kuwento ni Lola Basyang: Ang Prinsipeng Unggoy	Tinong
2007	Pangarap na Bituin	Cocoy Mendoza
2008	Iisa Pa Lamang	Rolando Ramirez
2008–2009	Sine Novela: Saan Darating ang Umaga?	Ruben Rodrigo
2009	Zorro	Don Roberto Pelaez
2010	Elena M. Patron's Momay	Donato "Donnie" Buenavidez
2010	Pilyang Kerubin	Dante Garcia
2010–2011	Grazilda	Fernando
2011	Wansapanataym: Buhawi Jack	Manuel Miranda
2011	100 Days to Heaven	Andres Delgado
2012	Walang Hanggan	William Alcantara
2012	Dahil sa Pag-Ibig	Benjamin Osorio
2012	Lorenzo's Time	Badong Gamboa
2013	Juan Dela Cruz	Jose "Mang Pepe" Guerrero
2013–2014	Honesto	Hugo Layer
2014	Ikaw Lamang	Samuel Hidalgo
2015	Wansapanataym: Remote ni Eric	Romy Gutierrez
2015–2016	On the Wings of Love	Soliman 'Sol' Olivar
2016–2021	FPJ's Ang Probinsyano	Teodoro "Teddy" Arevalo
2019–2020	Starla	Gregorio "Greggy" Dichaves
2021	It's Showtime	Magpasikat 2021 Judge
2022	One Good Day	Eddie Rodrigo
2023	Dirty Linen	Rolando Sinag / Abe Matias
2024	Pamilya Sagrado	Ernesto "Estong" Malonzo
2025	Incognito	Philip Rivera
2025—2026	Roja	Emil "Uno" Padua
2026—present	A Secret in Prague	Norberto Ruiz
2026	Kidnap Game	Miguel Garcia

=== Music video appearances ===
Year	Title	Performer	Director	Ref.
2021	Magpahinga	Ben&Ben	Jorel Lising	

== Accolades ==
Awards and NominationsAwards and nominations received by Joel Torre
Award	Year	Category	Nominated work	Result	Ref.
Cinemanila International Film Festival	2001	Best Actor	Batang West Side	Won	
Cinema One Originals Digital Film Festival	2008	Best Supporting Actor	Yanggaw	Won	
Cinema One Originals Digital Film Festival	2013	Best Actor	Kabisera	Won	
Cinema One Originals Digital Film Festival	2016	Best Supporting Actor	Tisay	Nominated	
CinePanalo Film Festival	2024	Best Supporting Actor	Under a Piaya Moon	Won	
FAMAS Award	1987	Best Actor	Unfaithful Wife	Nominated	
FAMAS Award	1989	Best Supporting Actor	Magkano ang Iyong Dangal?	Nominated	
FAMAS Award	1995	Best Actor	Lipa 'Arandia' Massacre: Lord, Deliver Us from Evil	Nominated	
FAMAS Award	1997	Best Supporting Actor	Mumbaki	Won	
FAMAS Award	1999	Best Supporting Actor	José Rizal	Nominated	
FAMAS Award	2014	Best Supporting Actor	On the Job	Nominated	
FAMAS Award	2025	Best Supporting Actor	Under a Piaya Moon	Nominated	
Gawad PASADO	2025	Best Actor (PinakaPASADOng Aktor)	Lolo and the Kid	Nominated	
Gawad Urian Award	1983	Best Actor (Pinakamahusay na Pangunahing Aktor)	Oro, Plata, Mata	Nominated	
Gawad Urian Award	1984	Best Supporting Actor (Pinakamahusay na Pangalawang Aktor)	Karnal	Nominated	
Gawad Urian Award	1987	Best Actor (Pinakamahusay na Pangunahing Aktor)	Unfaithful Wife	Nominated	
Gawad Urian Award	1987	Best Supporting Actor (Pinakamahusay na Pangalawang Aktor)	Bagong Hari	Nominated	
Gawad Urian Award	1997	Best Supporting Actor (Pinakamahusay na Pangalawang Aktor)	Mumbaki	Nominated	
Gawad Urian Award	1998	Best Actor (Pinakamahusay na Pangunahing Aktor)	Milagros	Nominated	
Gawad Urian Award	2000	Best Supporting Actor (Pinakamahusay na Pangalawang Aktor)	Bayaning 3rd World	Won	
Gawad Urian Award	2002	Best Actor (Pinakamahusay na Pangunahing Aktor)	Batang West Side	Won	
Gawad Urian Award	2011	Best Actor (Pinakamahusay na Pangunahing Aktor)	Amigo	Nominated	
Gawad Urian Award	2014	Best Actor (Pinakamahusay na Pangunahing Aktor)	On The Job	Won	
Golden Screen Awards	2014	Best Performance by an Actor in a Leading Role (Drama)	On The Job	Won	
Luna Award	2008	Best Actor	Ataul: For Rent	Nominated	
Metro Manila Film Festival	2016	Best Supporting Actor	Ang Babae sa Septic Tank 2: #ForeverIsNotEnough	Nominated	
Puchon International Fantastic Film Festival	2013	Best Actor	On The Job	Won	
PMPC Star Awards for Movies	2014	Movie Actor of the Year	On The Job	Nominated	
PMPC Star Awards for Movies	2017	Movie Supporting Actor of the Year	Tisay	Nominated	
PMPC Star Awards for Movies	2021	Movie Supporting Actor of the Year	Miracle in Cell No. 7	Nominated	
PMPC Star Awards for Movies	2025	Movie Supporting Actor of the Year	Under a Piaya Moon	Nominated	
PMPC Star Awards for Television	1991	Best Drama Actor	Boracay	Nominated	
PMPC Star Awards for Television	2014	Best Drama Supporting Actor	Ikaw Lamang	Nominated	
PMPC Star Awards for Television	2016	Best Single Performance by an Actor	Maalaala Mo Kaya: Kahon	Nominated	
PMPC Star Awards for Television	2025	Best Drama Supporting Actor	Dirty Linen	Nominated	
The EDDYS	2017	Best Supporting Actor	Die Beautiful	Nominated	
The EDDYS	2025	Best Actor	Lolo and the Kid	Nominated	
Young Critics Circle	2001	Best Performance	Tanging Yaman	Won	
