= Cedrick Juan =

Filipino actor (born 1990)

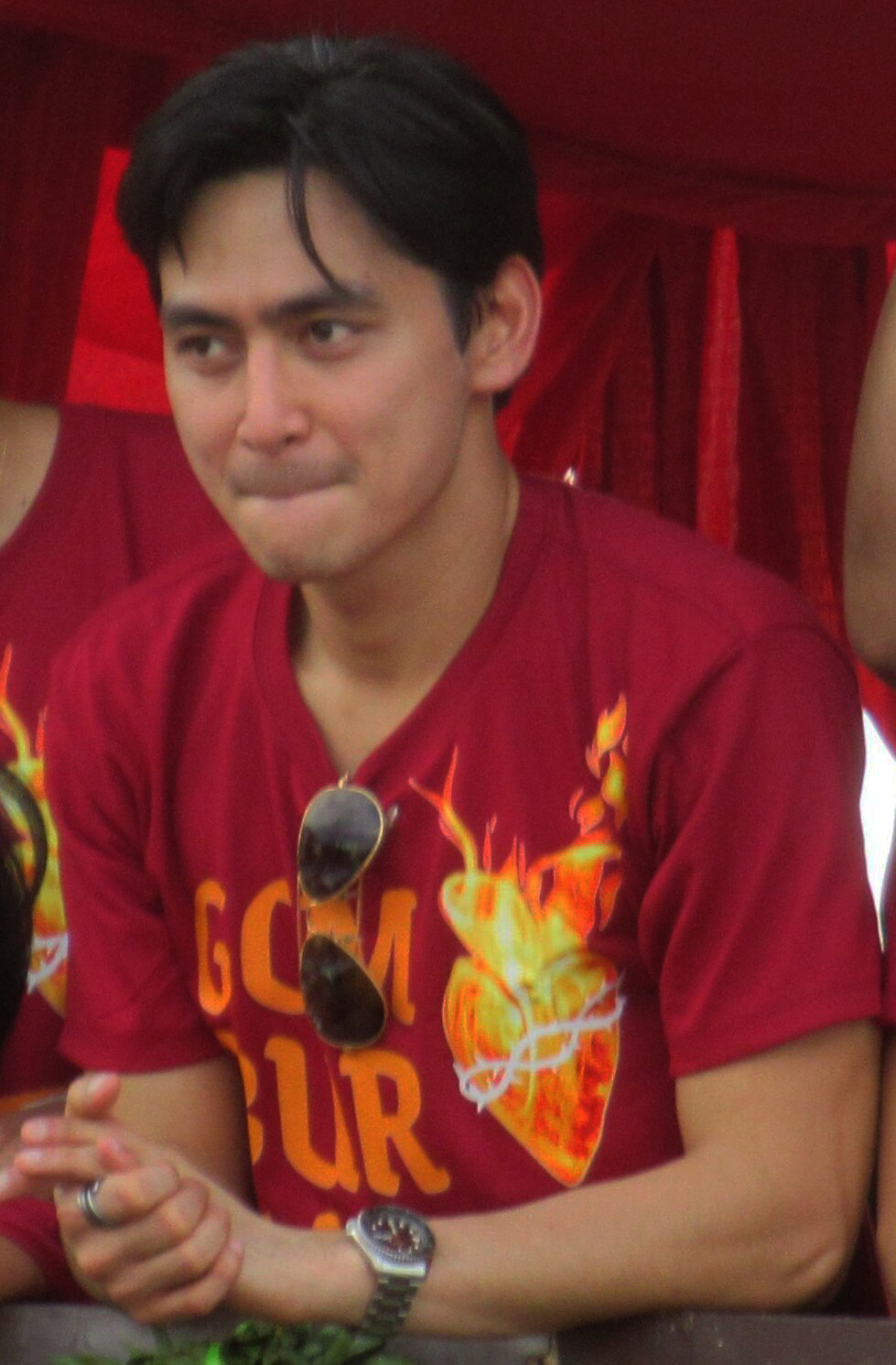
- Juan in 2023
- Born: Paul Cedrick Gutierrez Juan; June 26, 1990 (age 36); Santa Cruz, Manila, Philippines
- Occupation: Actor
- Years active: 2008–present
- Agent(s): MQuest Ventures and Star Worx (2024–present)
- Notable work: GomBurZa (2023)
- Height: 177 cm (5 ft 10 in)
- Spouse: Kate Alejandrino (m. 2025)
- Children: 1

Paul Cedrick Gutierrez Juan (born June 26, 1990) is a Filipino actor. He is best known for portraying the role of Fr. José Burgos in the historical film GomBurZa, for which he received the Best Actor award at the 2023 Metro Manila Film Festival.

== Early life and education ==
Paul Cedrick Gutierrez Juan was born on June 26, 1990, in Santa Cruz, Manila. He grew up in Santa Maria, Bulacan. He is the second eldest among eight siblings. Juan graduated from Far Eastern University with a degree in mass communication.

Juan began his career as a stage actor in 2008. His early acting work includes performances with Dulaang UP at the University of the Philippines Diliman from 2013 to 2016, as well as with the FEU-Art Theatre Clinique at Far Eastern University.

== Career ==
In 2022, Juan was cast in the musical Mula sa Buwan (From the Moon), a musical adaptation of Edmond Rostand's Cyrano De Bergerac.

In 2023, he portrayed Fr. José Burgos in GomBurZa, a historical biographical film that dramatizes the events leading to the execution of the titular martyr priests implicated in the Cavite Mutiny. He originally auditioned for the role of Cavite Mutiny leader Fernando La Madrid but was later offered the part of Fr. José Burgos by the film’s director, Pepe Diokno. For his performance, he won the Best Actor award at the 2023 Metro Manila Film Festival.

In 2024, Juan signed a contract with Manny Pangilinan's newly-launched MediaQuest Artist Agency, becoming one of 13 new artists to join TV5.

== Personal life ==
Juan married actress Kate Alejandrino in February 2025. The couple has one child.

== Filmography ==
=== Film ===
Key
†	Denotes films that have not yet been released

Year	Title	Role	Ref.
2011	Ang Sayaw ng Dalawang Kaliwang Paa	Marlon's friend	
2016	Viva Escolta	Short film	
2016	Bakit Lahat ng Gwapo may Boyfriend?	Henry's husband	
2016	Die Beautiful	Erika	
2016	Oro	Bong	
2017	Bliss	Director's boy	
2017	Last Night		
2017	Dapol tan Payawar na Tayug 1931	young Pedro Calosa	
2018	Goyo: Ang Batang Heneral	Col. Jose Leyba	
2019	The Panti Sisters	Estong	
2019	Utopia	Zed	
2019	Gitarista	Marcelo	
2019	Kalel, 15	Danny	
2020	Miss Q and A		
2021	Big Night!		
2022	Two and One	Joaquin	
2023	Fin	Isidro	
2023	Gomburza	José Burgos	
2024	The Kingdom	young Makisig Nandula	
2025	Manila's Finest	Officer Danilo Abad	
2026	Edjop	Noy Jopson	

=== Television ===
Year	Title	Role	Ref.
2014	Ilustrado	Valentin Ventura	
2015	Karelasyon	Two episodes	
2015	Single/Single	Guy at the bar	
2015–2016	Ipaglaban Mo	Three episodes	
2016	Till I Met You	Otap Miranda	
2017	Tadhana	Butchok	
2017	Wagas	Rocky	
2019	The Orbiters	Pol	
2019	Manilennials	Romeo	
2019	Uncoupling	Kurt	
2020	I Am U	Tristan	
2020–2021	Paano ang Pasko? / Paano ang Pangako?	Alex	
2021	Pearl Next Door	Linus	
2021	Now Streaming	Cedrick	
2023	Fit Check: Confessions of an Ukay Queen	Avel	
2023	Gud Morning Kapatid	Himself / Guest	
2023	TV Patrol	Himself / Star Patrol guest anchor	
2024	Eat Bulaga!	Himself / Guest / Mr. Cutie judge	
2024	Fast Talk with Boy Abunda	Himself / Guest	
2024	Tao Po!	Himself / Guest	
2024	Ang Himala ni Niño: Unang Libro ng Niña Niño	Victor Deogracia	
2025	Tropang G.O.A.T.	Coach Rom	
2026	A Secret in Prague	Sianong	
2026	Mommy Guard		

=== Theater ===
Year	Production	Role	Location	Ref.
2015	Bilanggo ng Pag-Ibig	Jacky Maglia	Wilfrido Ma. Guerrero Theater	
2022	Mula sa Buwan	Maximo	Samsung Performing Arts Theater	

== Accolades ==
Awards and NominationsAwards and nominations received by Cedrick Juan
Award	Year	Category	Nominated work	Result	Ref.
Aliw Awards	2017	Best Actor	Sakuntala: Ang Singsing ng Kapalaran sa Dusyanta	Won	
FAMAS Award	2024	Best Actor	Gomburza	Nominated	
Gawad Urian Award	2024	Best Actor	Gomburza	Nominated	
Luna Award	2024	Best Actor	Gomburza	Nominated	
Metro Manila Film Festival	2016	Best Supporting Actor	Oro	Nominated	
Metro Manila Film Festival	2023	Best Actor	GomBurZa	Won	
Metro Manila Film Festival	2025	Best Supporting Actor	Manila's Finest	Nominated	
PMPC Star Awards for Movies	2024	Movie Actor of the Year	GomBurZa	Nominated	
