= 2016 Metro Manila Film Festival =

Annual Philippine Festival edition

2016 Metro Manila Film Festival 42nd Metro Manila Film Festival
- Awards: Gabi ng Parangal (lit. 'Awards Night')
- No. of films: 8
- Festival date: December 25, 2016 to January 7, 2017

MMFF chronology
- 43rd ed. 41st ed.

The 2016 Metro Manila Film Festival (MMFF) is the 42nd edition of the annual Metro Manila Film Festival held in Metro Manila and throughout the Philippines. It is organized by the Metropolitan Manila Development Authority (MMDA). This is the first time that the festival committee required producers to submit either picture lock versions or finished films, instead of screenplays in previous editions. During the festival, no foreign films are shown in Philippine theaters (except IMAX, 4D, and large format 3D theaters), however there are some non-MMFF entries like The Super Parental Guardians, and Enteng Kabisote 10 and the Abangers shown on SM Cinema branches.

The festival began with the traditional Parada ng mga Artista (Parade of Stars) on December 23, 2016. The float parade started from Bonifacio Shrine to Plaza Miranda in Manila. Regular showing of the 8 full-feature movies and 8 short films took place from December 25, 2016 until January 7, 2017 in major cinemas across Metro Manila and other parts of the country. The Gabi ng Parangal (Awards Night) was held on December 29, 2016 in Kia Theatre.

In the awards night, the film Sunday Beauty Queen won the Best Picture award, the first documentary film to receive the top honor. EJK won the Best Short Film, while Seklusyon garnered the most major awards in the festival, with 8 awards including the Best Director award for Erik Matti.

The television coverage of the Parade of Stars and the Awards Night was produced by Viva Entertainment and it was shown via delayed basis on IBC-13.

The festival serves as the first MMFF edition under the leadership of MMDA General Manager and MMFF Overall Chairman Thomas Orbos.

== Launch and reform ==
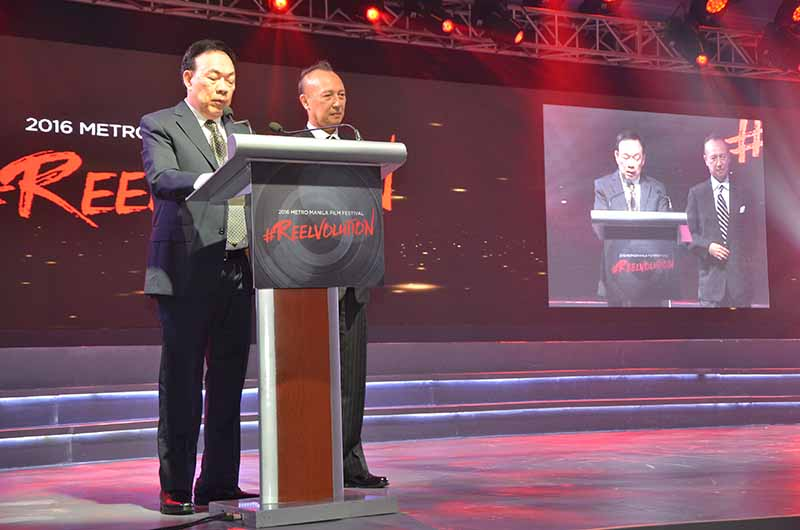
Launch of the 2016 Metro Manila Film Festival.

The 2016 Metro Manila Film Festival was formally launched on June 28, 2016 at the SMX Convention Center. It was announced that there would be major changes from the previous edition such as the criteria of choosing the final 8 films to be shown, and the awarding.

A grand launch for the film festival dubbed as "Countdown to MMFF 2016" took place on December 3, 2016 at the SM North EDSA Skydome. The MMFF Awards Night (Gabi ng Parangal) was later announced to take place on December 29, 2016, instead of January 8, 2017, the last day of the MMFF.

In the latter half of December 2016, it was announced that the 2016 MMFF will last until January 3, 2017 instead of January 8. The run will be four days shorter than the run of the last 16 editions of the film festival. Previous editions lasted 14 days and as of the 2015 edition an Implementing Rules and Regulation sets an "extended" run for the film festival until January 7. The decision to shorten the run of the MMFF was made by the executive committee citing that the executive order by Imelda Marcos mandates that the ending date of the film festival should be on January 3. But due to public demand, the MMDA has asked the owners of theaters scattered around malls in the country to extend the film showing of the 8 movies of the MMFF until January 7, 2017 while foreign films will returns on January 4 2017. Later that month, the MMFF Executive Committee was successful to extend the screenings of all entries until January 7 in selected cinemas, particularly in SM Supermalls.

== Brand image ==
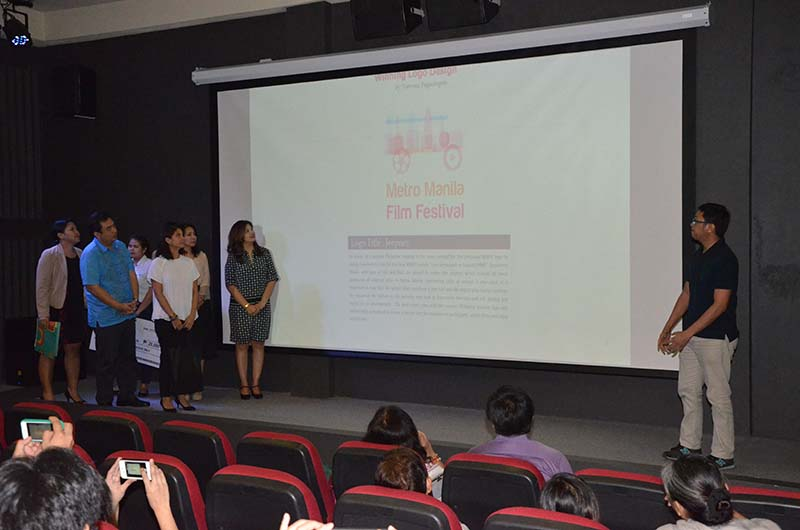
Launching of the film festival's new logo to be used starting the 2016 edition. September 2016.

It was announced in June 2016 that a logo design competition and theme song making competition was to be held. The competitions lasted from July 15 until August 31, 2016.

By September 2016, the winning logo and theme song was announced. Nawruz Paguidopon's Jeepney logo was the winning design among the about 400 entries submitted. The MMFF Executive Committee reasons that the logo was the "simplest but the most iconic logo" among the submitted entries and that it represented the film festival's new vision "CineSama para sa Bagong MMFF". The logo consists of blue and red geometric shapes which portrays an image of a jeepney along with shapes depicting select landmarks of Metro Manila. The winning theme song was "Cinesama Kayo" by Emilyn Ofindo which bested over 13 other entries.

== Entries ==
=== Feature films ===
The following was the criteria used in determining the final 8 entries:
1. Story, audience appeal, overall impact (40.0%)
2. Cinematic attributes or technical excellence (40.0%)
3. Global appeal (10.0%)
4. Filipino sensibility (10.0%)

The official list of entries was announced on November 18, 2016. From the 27 entries, 8 were chosen for the festival.

| Title | Starring | Studio | Director | Genre |
|---|---|---|---|---|
| Ang Babae sa Septic Tank 2: #ForeverIsNotEnough | Eugene Domingo, Jericho Rosales, Kean Cipriano, Cai Cortez, Khalil Ramos, Joel Torre | Martinez Rivera Films, Quantum Films, Tuko Film Productions, Buchi Boy Films, MJM Production | Marlon Rivera | Comedy |
| Die Beautiful | Paolo Ballesteros, Christian Bables, Joel Torre, Gladys Reyes, Luis Alandy, Albie Casiño | The IdeaFirst Company, Octobertrain Films, Regal Entertainment | Jun Lana | Comedy, Drama |
| Kabisera | Nora Aunor, Ricky Davao, JC De Vera, Jason Abalos, RJ Agustin, Victor Neri, Ronwaldo Martin | Firestarters Productions, Silver Story Production | Arturo San Agustin, Real Florido | Drama |
| Oro | Irma Adlawan, Joem Bascon, Mercedes Cabral | Feliz Film Productions | Alvin Yapan | Political thriller |
| Saving Sally | Rhian Ramos, Enzo Marcos | Rocketsheep Studios | Avid Liongoren | Live-action/ animation, Romance, Sci-fi |
| Seklusyon | Rhed Bustamante, Neil Ryan Sese, Ronnie Alonte, Lou Veloso, Phoebe Walker, Dominic Roque, Elora Españo, John Vic De Guzman, JR Versales | Reality Entertainment | Erik Matti | Horror |
| Sunday Beauty Queen | Rudelyn Acosta, Cherrie Mae Bretana, Mylyn Jacobo, Hazel Perdido, Leo Selomenio | Voyage Studios, Tuko Film Productions, Buchi Boy Films | Baby Ruth Villarama | Documentary drama |
| Vince & Kath & James | Julia Barretto, Joshua Garcia, Ronnie Alonte | Star Cinema | Theodore Boborol | Romantic comedy |

=== Short films ===
- Birds – Christian Paolo Lat
- EJK – Bor Ocampo
- Manila Scream – Roque Lee & Blair Camilo
- Mga Bitoon sa Siudad – Jarell Serencio
- Mitatang – Arvin Jezer Gagui
- Momo – Avid Liongoren
- Passage of Life – Renz Vincemark Cruz & Hannah Daryl Gayapa
- Heart’s All Gone – Marlontje
- Sitsiritsit – Brian Spencer Reyes

== Parade of Stars ==
The Film Development Council of the Philippine coordinated with the MMFF organizers described to be "simpler" Parade of Stars than parades of the previous editions. The parade took place in December 23, 2016. "Standard size" vehicles were used instead of grand floats.

The parade began at N. Lopez Street beside the Manila City Hall. The parade convoy passed through Taft Avenue then crossed the Jones Bridge. Quintin Paredes Street in Manila Chinatown, as well as Reina Regente Street, Recto and Rizal Avenues, Fugoso Street, and Quezon Boulevard were also part of the parade route. The parade ended at Plaza Miranda.

== Awards ==
2016 Metro Manila Film Festival Gabi ng Parangal
- Date: December 29, 2016

Highlights
- Best Picture: Sunday Beauty Queen
- Most awards: Seklusyon (8)

Television coverage
- Network: IBC 13

=== Major awards ===
Winners are listed first, highlighted with boldface and indicated with a double dagger (‡). Nominees are also listed if applicable.

| Best Picture | Best Director |
|---|---|
| **Sunday Beauty Queen – Voyage Studios, Tuko Film Productions,** **Buchi Boy Films**‡; Ang Babae sa Septic Tank 2: #ForeverIsNotEnough – Martinez Rivera Films, Quantum Films, Tuko Film Productions, Buchi Boy Films, MJM Production; Die Beautiful – The IdeaFirst Company, Octobertrain Films; Kabisera – Firestarters Productions, Silver Story Production; Oro – Feliz Film Productions; Saving Sally – Rocketsheep Studios; Seklusyon – Reality Entertainment; Vince & Kath & James – Star Cinema | **Erik Matti – Seklusyon**‡; Jun Lana – Die Beautiful; Avid Liongoren – Saving Sally; Baby Ruth Villarama – Sunday Beauty Queen |
| Best Actor | Best Actress |
| **Paolo Ballesteros – Die Beautiful**‡; Joem Bascon – Oro; Kean Cipriano – Ang Babae sa Septic Tank 2: #ForeverIsNotEnough; Joshua Garcia – Vince & Kath & James | **Irma Adlawan – Oro**‡; Nora Aunor – Kabisera; Rhed Bustamante – Seklusyon; Eugene Domingo – Ang Babae sa Septic Tank 2: #ForeverIsNotEnough |
| Best Supporting Actor | Best Supporting Actress |
| **Christian Bables – Die Beautiful**‡; Cedrick Juan – Oro; Joel Torre – Ang Babae sa Septic Tank 2: #ForeverIsNotEnough; Lou Veloso – Seklusyon | **Phoebe Walker – Seklusyon**‡; Mercedes Cabral – Oro; Cai Cortez – Ang Babae sa Septic Tank 2: #ForeverIsNotEnough; Gladys Reyes – Die Beautiful |
| Best Ensemble Cast | Best Screenplay |
| **Oro**‡; Ang Babae sa Septic Tank 2: #ForeverIsNotEnough; Die Beautiful | **Anton Santamaria – Seklusyon**‡; Chris Martinez – Ang Babae sa Septic Tank 2: #ForeverIsNotEnough; Charlene Sawit-Esguerra and Carlo Ledesma – Saving Sally; Rody Vera – Die Beautiful |
| Best Cinematography | Best Production Design |
| **Neil Bion – Seklusyon**‡; Lee Briones-Meily – Ang Babae sa Septic Tank 2: #ForeverIsNotEnough; Odyssey Flores and Rommel Sales – Saving Sally; Ronald Rebutica – Oro | **Ericson Navarro – Seklusyon**‡; Angel Diesta – Die Beautiful; Rommel Laquian and Erik Manalo – Saving Sally |
| Best Editing | Best Sound Design |
| **Chuck Gutierrez – Sunday Beauty Queen**‡; Jether Amar and Jethro Razo – Saving Sally; Jay Halili – Seklusyon | **Lamberto Casas, Jr. and Albert Michael Idioma – Seklusyon**‡; Jess Carlos – Oro; Joshua Cantillon and Mikko Quizon – Saving Sally |
| Best Original Theme Song | Best Musical Score |
| **"Dominus Miserere" from Seklusyon – Francis de Veyra**‡; "Nananaghoy ang Puso Ko" from Oro – Tonton Hernandez; "Hey Crush" from Vince & Kath & James – Volts Vallejo | **Pablo Pico – Saving Sally**‡; Francis de Veyra – Seklusyon; Jessie Lasaten – Vince & Kath & James |
| Gatpuno Antonio J. Villegas Cultural Award | Fernando Poe Jr. Memorial Award for Excellence |
| **Sunday Beauty Queen**‡ | **Oro**‡; (revoked due to dog slaughter scene issue) |
| Special Jury Prize | Best Float |
| **Rhed Bustamante – Seklusyon**‡ | **Die Beautiful**‡ |
| My Most Favorite Film | Children's Choice Award |
| **Die Beautiful**‡ | **Saving Sally**‡; **Sunday Beauty Queen**‡; **Vince & Kath & James**‡ |

==== Other awards ====
- Male Celebrity of the Night – **Ronnie Alonte**
- Female Celebrity of the Night – **Rhian Ramos**

=== Short Film category ===
- Best Picture – **EJK by Bor Ocampo**
- Special Jury Prize – **Manila Scream by Roque Lee & Blair Camilo**
- Best Director – **Jarell Serencio, Mga Bitoon sa Siudad**
- Best Screenplay – **Mitatang**
- Best Work for Children – **Passage of Life**

== Multiple awards ==
| Awards | Film |
|---|---|
| 8 | Seklusyon |
| 4 | Die Beautiful |
| 4 | Sunday Beauty Queen |
| 2 | Oro |
| 2 | Saving Sally |

== Box Office gross ==
The MMFF Executive Committee announced on December 26, that it has reached the target gross ticket sales during the opening of the festival on December 25, Christmas Day. The MMFF also announced the 4 top-grossing movies during the opening day, in alphabetical order, namely Ang Babae sa Septic Tank 2: #ForeverIsNotEnough, Die Beautiful, Seklusyon and Vince & Kath & James. However, the committee did not disclose the actual box office earnings at that time, since most of the cinemas reportedly didn't submit the full ticket gross reports. According to MMDA Chairman Thomas Orbos, the 2016 edition had grossed only half a billion pesos or half of last year's total gross. The Metropolitan Manila Development Authority was criticized for not releasing official earnings of each film. This led to some film studios releasing their own earnings.

Here are the rankings and overall gross ticket sales as of January 3, 2017:

Overall Rankings
| # | Metro Manila | Provinces |
|---|---|---|
| 1. | Die Beautiful | Vince & Kath & James |
| 2. | Seklusyon | Seklusyon |
| 3. | Vince & Kath & James | Die Beautiful |
| 4. | Saving Sally | Ang Babae sa Septic Tank 2: #ForeverIsNotEnough |
| 5. | Ang Babae sa Septic Tank 2: #ForeverIsNotEnough | Saving Sally |
| 6. | Sunday Beauty Queen | Sunday Beauty Queen |
| 7. | Oro | Oro |
| 8. | Kabisera | Kabisera |

Overall Nationwide Gross (As claimed by Star Cinema)
| # | Entry | Gross Ticket Sales January 3 |
|---|---|---|
| 1. | Vince & Kath & James | ₱ 105 million* |
| 2. | Die Beautiful | ₱ 98 million |
| 3. | Seklusyon | ₱ 82 million |
| 4. | Ang Babae sa Septic Tank 2: #ForeverIsNotEnough | ₱ 45 million |
| 5. | Saving Sally | ₱ 27 million |
| 6. | Sunday Beauty Queen | ₱ 7.8 million |
| 7. | Kabisera | ₱ 4.3 million |
| 8. | Oro | ₱ 4.2 million |
| | TOTAL | ₱ 373.3 million |

| Preceded by 2015 Metro Manila Film Festival | Metro Manila Film Festival; 2016 | Succeeded by 2017 Metro Manila Film Festival |
