= Sunday Beauty Queen =

- Theatrical release poster
- Chinese: 周日皇后
- Literal meaning: Sunday Queen
- Hanyu Pinyin: Zhōurì huánghòu
- Jyutping: Zau1 jat6 wong4 hau6
- Directed by: Baby Ruth Villarama
- Produced by: Chuck Gutierrez
- Starring: Rudelyn Acosta; Cherrie Mae Bretana; Mylyn Jacobo; Hazel Perdido; Leo Selomenio
- Cinematography: Dexter Dela Peña
- Edited by: Chuck Gutierrez
- Music by: Emerzon Texon
- Production companies: Voyage Studios; Tuko Film Productions; Buchi Boy Films
- Distributed by: Solar Pictures
- Release dates: October 7, 2016 (BIFF); December 25, 2016 (MMFF)
- Running time: 95 minutes
- Country: Philippines
- Languages: English; Filipino

Sunday Beauty Queen is a 2016 Filipino documentary film directed by Baby Ruth Villarama and follows a group of expatriate domestic workers in Hong Kong as they prepare to take part in an annual beauty pageant. It made its world premiere in the Wide Angle documentary competition at the 21st Busan International Film Festival in 2016.

The film is an official entry to the 2016 Metro Manila Film Festival.

== Plot ==
It follows a group of Filipino expatriate immigrant domestic workers in Hong Kong as they prepare their annual beauty contest.

== Cast ==
- Rudelyn Acosta
- Cherrie Mae Bretana
- Mylyn Jacobo
- Hazel Perdido
- Leo Selomenio
- Bryan Chavez

== See also ==
- Food Delivery (film)
