= Ronnie Alonte =

Filipino actor, model, dancer and endorser

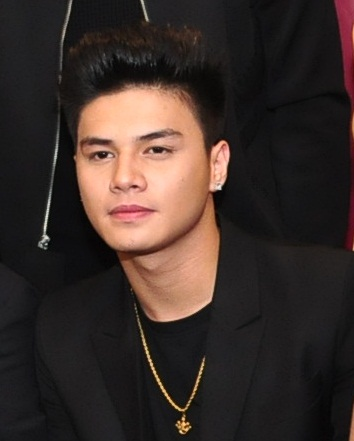
- Alonte in 2016
- Born: Ronaldo Alcantara Alonte II; October 26, 1996 (age 29); Biñan, Laguna, Philippines
- Other name: R2
- Education: University of Perpetual Help System Laguna
- Occupations: Actor, model, dancer, singer
- Years active: 2015–present
- Agents: Star Magic (2015–present); Dreamscape Entertainment (2019–present)
- Known for: Hashtags
- Spouse: Loisa Andalio (m. 2025)
- Children: 1
- Relatives: Len Alonte (first cousin once removed); Gel Alonte (first cousin once removed); Gela Alonte (second cousin); Lucas Andalio (nephew)
- Basketball career

Personal information
- Listed height: 5 ft 10 in (1.78 m)

Career information
- Playing career: 2024–present
- Number: 26

Career history
- 2024–2025: Biñan Tatak Gel

Ronaldo Alcantara Alonte II (born October 26, 1996) is a Filipino actor, singer, dancer, and basketball player. He appeared in the films Seklusyon (2016), Vince & Kath & James (2016), and its sequel James and Pat and Dave (2020).

Alonte is also a member of the dance group Hashtags and the dance group was a former cast member on the noontime variety show It's Showtime from 2015 to 2021.

== Showbiz career ==
Alonte first appeared as a member of Hashtags in 2015, a dance group in the daytime show It's Showtime. Hashtags released their debut self-titled album on May 21, 2016, with "Roadtrip" released as the album's lead single. Alonte also released a solo single entitled "Love at Website". The single was an entry to the Himig Handog P-Pop Love Songs (2016) which made it to the Top 30 of the competition. Alonte performed the song on Gandang Gabi Vice on August 21, 2016, as well as on It's Showtime.

In 2016, he made several appearances on the drama anthology Maalaala Mo Kaya, including the portrayal of his own story. In the same year, he starred in two films: Vince & Kath & James and Seklusyon directed by Erik Matti, both of which were entered into the 2016 Metro Manila Film Festival.

In 2017, Alonte and Julia Barretto, his co-star in Vince & Kath & James, appeared in the melodrama series A Love to Last, co-starring Bea Alonzo, Ian Veneracion and Iza Calzado. In the same year, he starred in Bloody Crayons as John Jose.

== Basketball career ==
In 2024, Alonte made his way to professional basketball, joining the Biñan Tatak Gel of the Maharlika Pilipinas Basketball League and Pilipinas Super League.

== Personal life ==
In November 2025, Alonte married actress and former onscreen partner Loisa Andalio, having been in a relationship with her since 2016. Their first child was born in March 2026.

== Filmography ==
=== Film ===
Year	Title	Role	Notes	Ref.
2016	Vince & Kath & James	Jaime "James" Raymundo III	Entry for the 42nd Metro Manila Film Festival	
2016	Seklusyon	Miguel	Entry for the 42nd Metro Manila Film Festival	
2017	Bloody Crayons	John Jose Abrillo	Main role	
2018	Da One That Ghost Away	Isagani	Special participation	
2018	Fantastica	Daks Padilla	Entry for the 44th Metro Manila Film Festival	
2020	James and Pat and Dave	Jaime "James" Raymundo III	Main role	
2022	My Teacher	Francis	Entry for the 48th Metro Manila Film Festival	

=== Television ===
Year	Title	Role	Note
2015	It's Showtime	Himself / Hashtag Member-Performer and Main Stay Co-Host	Main Cast
2015	Maalaala Mo Kaya: Picture	Friend	
2015	Maalaala Mo Kaya: Banana Split	John	
2016	Pinoy Big Brother: Lucky 7	Himself	Guest Housemate
2016	Maalaala Mo Kaya: Traysikel	Teen Rafael	
2016	Maalaala Mo Kaya: Motorsiklo - The Ronnie Alonte Story	Himself	
2016	Maalaala Mo Kaya: Sulat	Luis	
2017	A Love to Last	Christopher "Tupe" Dimayuga	
2017	Ipaglaban Mo: Pikon	Jun Hilario	
2018	Wansapanataym: Gelli In A Bottle	Robin	Main Cast
2019	Maalaala Mo Kaya: Jersey	Paul Desiderio	
2019	The General's Daughter	Ivan Cañega	Supporting Role
2020	Fill in the Bank	Himself / Contestant	Guest
2021	Unloving U	Alfie Almeida	Lead Role
2022	The Goodbye Girl	Gabe	
2022	Love in 40 Days	Edward Montemayor / Nathaniel Rosal	Lead Role
2023	Pira-Pirasong Paraiso	Jonathan "Jonaf" Salvador	Lead Role

== Accolades ==
Year	Award	Category	Work	Result
2016	8th PMPC Star Awards for Music	Dance Album of the Year	Hashtags	Won
2016	30th PMPC Star Awards for Television	Best New Male TV Personality	MMK: Motorsiklo	Nominated
2016	ASAP Pop Viewers' Choice Awards	Pop Hearthrob	—N/a	Nominated
2016	42nd Metro Manila Film Festival	Male Celebrity of the Night	Seklusyon	Won
2017	MYX Music Awards	Favorite Myx Celeb VJ	—N/a	Nominated
2017	35th Luna Awards	Best Supporting Actor	Seklusyon	Nominated
2017	33rd PMPC Star Awards for Movies	New Movie Actor of the Year	Vince & Kath & James	Nominated
2017	33rd PMPC Star Awards for Movies	Movie Loveteam of the Year with (Julia Barretto)	Vince & Kath & James	Nominated
2017	65th FAMAS Awards	Best Supporting Actor	Vince & Kath & James	Nominated
