= Saving Sally =

- Theatrical release poster
- Directed by: Avid Liongoren
- Screenplay by: Charlene Sawit-Esguerra; Carlo Ledesma; Avid Liongoren
- Story by: Charlene Sawit-Esguerra
- Based on: Saving Sally by Charlene Sawit-Esguerra
- Produced by: Avid Liongoren; Hervé Pennequin; Alain de la Mata; Catherine Jaques
- Starring: Rhian Ramos; Enzo Marcos
- Cinematography: Odyssey Flores; Rommel Sales
- Edited by: Jether Amar; Juliette Haubois; Avid Liongoren; Jethro Razo
- Music by: Pablo Pico
- Production companies: Rocketsheep Studios; Mandrake Films; KB Studios; Alchemedia Productions
- Distributed by: Solar Pictures
- Release date: December 25, 2016
- Running time: 94 minutes
- Country: Philippines
- Language: English
- Budget: ₱10,000.00
- Box office: ₱27 million

Saving Sally is a 2016 Philippine film (Note: See the corresponding section of this article for further information regarding the film's genre.) directed by Avid Liongoren in his directorial debut. Combining live action and animation, the film revolves around Marty (Enzo Marcos), an amateur comic book artist who falls for Sally (Rhian Ramos), a gadget inventor, and has since become her loyal protector and hero from the "monsters": her abusive parents, and her obnoxious boyfriend Nick (TJ Trinidad).

Production on Saving Sally commenced in 2005 and came to a halt for lack of financing. Liongoren co-wrote the screenplay with Charlene Sawit-Esguerra and Carlo Ledesma, based on a short story written by Sawit-Esguerra in 2002, which was titled Monster Town. French producers then took interest in funding the film and production resumed in 2010.

The film is an official entry to the 2016 Metro Manila Film Festival where it had a lackluster opening at the box office, but went on to earn ₱27 million and was one of the festival's top-grossing entries by the end of its run. Critical reception was mostly positive, with particular praise for its creativity, visual effects, and film score, while some criticized the plot for being too formulaic.

The film was streamed on YouTube on November 7, 2025.

== Plot ==
Marty is an amateur comic book artist who sees the world around him as a vivid picture book and also sees most people he dislikes or is indifferent to as monsters. When he was still a high school sophomore, Marty was often picked on by a bully until Sally, a gadget inventor intervenes and later helps Marty exact revenge by humiliating the bully in public. The two immediately become best friends, and as time passed, Marty develops an attraction for Sally, but such feelings remained unrequited.

As Marty spends time with Sally, he learns that her adoptive parents are strict and suspects that she is being physically abused by them. Sometimes Sally excuses that she is busy with a "secret project". The two develop a system utilizing a high-powered telescope and a codebook of signals using clothes, which enables them to interact than what Sally's parents would allow. After graduating from high school during the summer, Sally and Marty decide to attend the same college together as fine arts students. Marty receives a call from a comic book publisher, Renegade Komiks, and gets an opportunity to pitch a comic storyline from the eyepatch-wearing editor Toto. While the two are in a swing at the park near dusk, Marty yet attempts to reveal his feelings for Sally; Sally, however, reveals that she is in a relationship with Nick, whom Marty views as a dickhead and a monster.

Marty presents his pitch to Renegade Komiks. Stuck with his initial comic concept, Marty presents a new story to Toto which is about an astronomer who dedicates his life to a girl abducted by aliens in a prison, which is inspired by his own experiences with Sally, her parents, and Nick. While initially averse to publishing a love story, Toto decides to give it a try; the comic was a success on release.

Nick invites Marty to a rave party. Marty gets drunk, talks to a girl who compliments Nick as a friendly guy, and sees the girl dance with Nick. At Nick's car, he tells Marty his intention to wed Sally. Sally asks Marty to buy art supplies one day, and the two spot Nick dating the girl Marty met earlier across the street. Marty and Sally argue in Marty's room, and Sally finds Marty's secret drawings of her. Marty suddenly admits his feelings toward her, but Sally says she is not ready to commit to a relationship. Marty succumbs to depression and drew grim drawings, compiles them into his "Book of Sad" and sends it to Sally.

The two grew distant from each other as they both entered college; Sally had another boyfriend and Marty had a girlfriend. Nevertheless, fate continued to set them up with each other, until one day when Sally approached Marty and asked him to autograph her copy of the comics he wrote. Sally says she plans to sell the comics with his autograph when he becomes famous. Sally reveals that she broke up with her boyfriend and Marty said that his girlfriend has emigrated to Australia. Sally later sends a "Book of Happy" to Marty, an interactive pop-up book depicting their adventures, to cheer him up. Noticing a small reproduction of their old codebook containing instructions to open the book in reverse, Marty realizes that the book also functions as a flip book, which is Sally's attempt to tell him that she now returns his feelings.

This rejuvenates Marty's feelings for Sally and immediately goes to her house, but he overhears her parents physically beating her. Marty knocks on the door and sees her with a bruise on her mouth, which Sally explains was caused by an accident. Marty refuses to accept the explanation, deducing the real cause of her bruise were her parents, and he urges Sally to run away from her abusive parents. He and Sally go to her room to get her belongings and successfully escape her parents as they chase them upon leaving the house.

Sally brings Marty to a dumpster where she reveals the "secret project" that she worked on: a hideout full of gadgets with her secret project revealing to be a rocket that she planned to use to escape but no longer needs to. Marty continued working for Renegade Publishing and used that money to lend to Sally to rent her apartment which she later paid back with money she earned from her photo exhibit. They both graduate and continue their relationship together

== Cast ==
Principal characters of Saving Sally Live portrayals from bottom-left counter clockwise: Marty, Sally, Nick. The character standing on Sally's palm is Nick's illustrated monster portrayal, and the two monster characters above are Sally mother (left) and father (right) who also had live roles in the film.

- Rhian Ramos as Sally; A gadget inventor characterized as a witty and clever but vulnerable girl who exhibits a kind of melancholic loneliness. The makers of the film describes this trait as a manifestation of the character's inner turmoil or clues to her mysterious private life.

Anna Larrucea portrayed Sally in the initial 2005 shooting of the film but she was no longer available, when Liongoren made a reshoot of the film with the help of de la Mata. A long audition was held to find Larrucea's replacement which was Rhian Ramos. Ramos was not involved in an indie film or participated in an audition before her involvement with Saving Sally. TJ Trinidad who was also part of the film was the one invited Ramos to auditioned for the role.

Screenwriter Sawit stated that the film makers were deliberately avoiding to cast someone "famous" to avoid "dealing with management" but still choose to cast Ramos for the role of a character described to exhibit a combination of vulnerability, quirkiness, toughness and intelligence.

- Enzo Marcos as Marty; a comic book artist which is described by the film's main site as possessing "the innate ability to do nothing about everything despite his vivid fantasies of defending the love of his life", Sally, from the "big bad world." The character views himself as the protector and hero of Sally. The monsters which forms part of the film's universe are people which is Marty dislikes or apathetic to.

Marcos was also assigned the role of Marty through an audition like Rhian Ramos did for her role of Sally. Marcos was encourage by the film's writer who is also his mentor to audition for the role. Liongoren describes Marcos, with his expressive face and youthful energy, "was Marty".

- TJ Trinidad as Nick the Dick; Sally's boyfriend. Marty disdains Nick and is viewed by Marty as a penis monster.

Trinidad became involved in Saving Sally due to liking Liongoren's past works as an illustrator and video director.

- Archie Adamos and Shamaine Buencamino as Sally's Parents; Liongoren characterizes the two characters as "very puritan" with there residence made to resemble a church. They are unfeeling and distant towards their daughter. Marty also sees them as monsters. Adamos portrayed Sally's father while Buencamino took the role of Sally's mother.

Other members of the cast are Bodjie Pascua and Carmen Sanchez who portrayed Marty's parents and Peejo Pilar who portrayed the Toto Calasanz which was characterized as a flamboyant comic publisher who works for Renegade Publishing.

Ramos described that members of the cast did not have to "supercharacterize" explaining that she felt the same way as her character Sally, that Marcos is the same as Marty and Trinidad is the same as Nick in his "own funny way" but added during the interview done after the film's production that Trinidad "graduated a bit".

== Genre ==
Saving Sally has been described as a "teenage love story", blended with science fantasy and comedy-drama elements.

== Production ==
=== Development ===
Saving Sally was a concept by Charlene Sawit, a fine arts graduate from the University of the Philippines Diliman. Its conception dates back in 2000 when Sawit and Saving Sally director Avid Liongoren were in college, with the two having discussed the concept back then. Initially titled as Monster Town, Sawit spent two-and-a-half years writing Saving Sally as a novel. One day, however, Sawit's tote bag, which included the manuscript in it, was stolen from her car. She then took months of hiatus from writing and reconstructed Saving Sally as a short story instead. Sawit stated that she used her friends and her own experiences in coming up with the characters of the story.

Liongoren has stated that the original intent in making the film was not to submit an entry at a film festival but to post a film in the internet where the anyone can watch Saving Sally at no cost. Sawit states this, as the reason why the film is largely in English. Liongoren has stated that the film was not inspired from Scott Pilgrim vs. the World as suggested by some noting that the film was released in 2010, some years after the concept of the film was first made. He said however that if Saving Sally is to be compared to another film, it should be MirrorMask.

=== Themes and setting ===
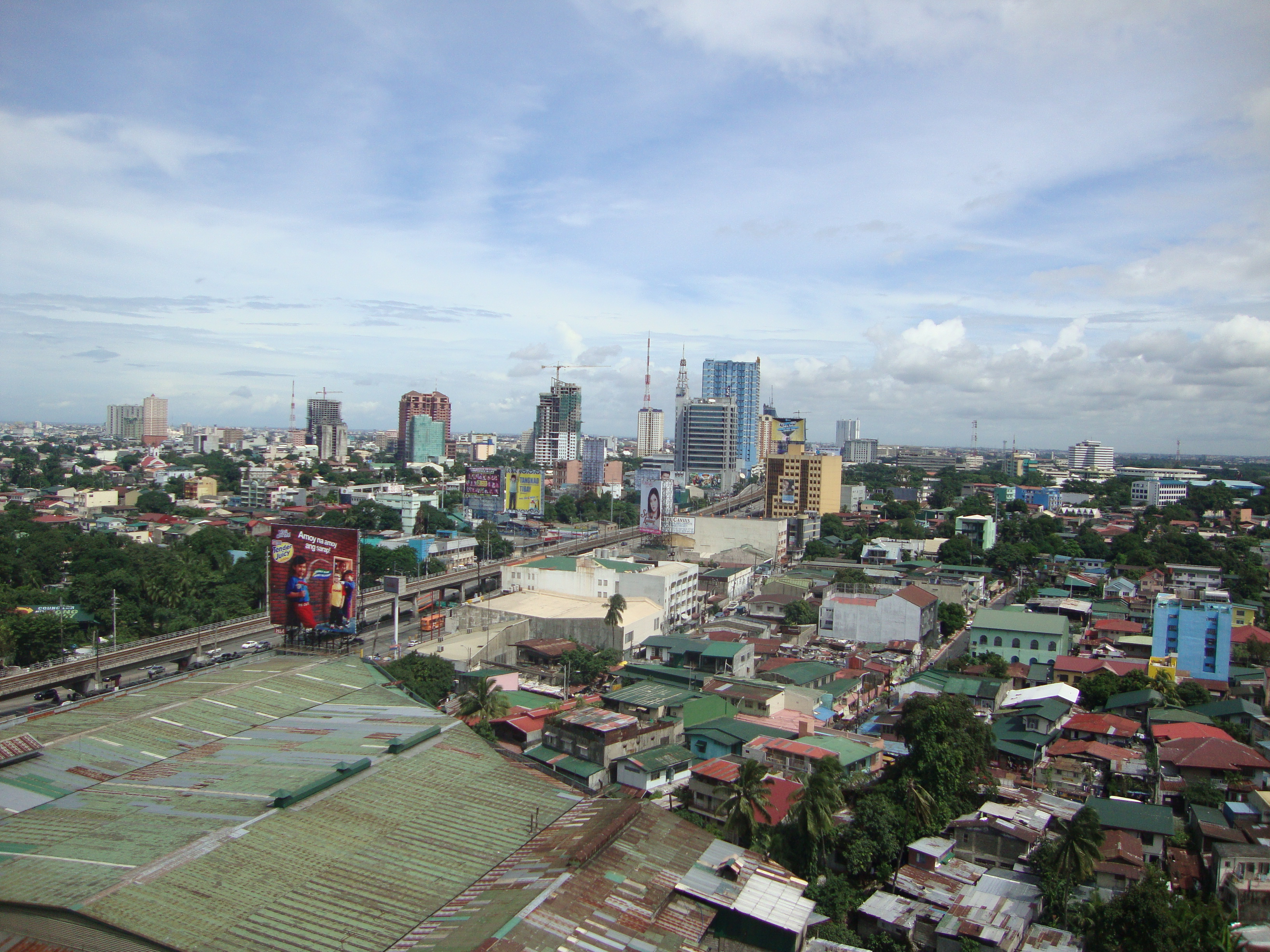
Skyline of Quezon City

Sawit describes Saving Sally as a "fun and straightforward love story, with good laughs and visual gags" on face value which makes references to both Philippine and Western pop culture but adds that it also tackles darker themes such as escapism and physical abuse.

The film's setting was largely inspired from Quezon City. The filmmakers stated that Marty's house is in Quezon City while Sally's is in Antipolo, Rizal. The park named "Sandara Park" where the two main characters frequent are set in Marikina. The park itself was inspired from the University of the Philippines, Antipolo and Marikina.

Sally's house situated on top of a cliff reflected the turmoil of her character and was patterned after a church to symbolize her parents' puritanical characterization. The view from Sally's house was based on a view of the Quezon City skyline from the small condominium building in Teacher's Village which director Liongoren used to stay. He narrated how a child who grew up with Marvel Comics would draw New York City if asked to draw a cityscape, hence they decided to learn how to draw local environments for the film.

=== Filming ===
Principal photography on the film began as early as 2005, but production came to a halt due to budgetary constraints. Two to three years into the first making of the film, French film producer Alain de la Mata decided to help Liongoren after he was impressed with the idea behind the film. De la Mata remarked that the film's sound and special effects were poor, and asked if it is possible to reshoot it again. The film originally consisted of 3D elements, devised puppets, and members of the cast dressed up as monsters, but these were later scrapped and focus on 2D animation be given instead.

The French were involved in the production of Saving Sally. The film received a grant from the government of France. The visuals of the film were entirely done by Filipinos while the French were involved in the audition process and gave consultations regarding the film's sounds. The film's producers elected to use macOS computers due to their perceived stability, but budgetary constraints forced them to make do with Hackintosh setups made from commodity Windows PCs.

Shooting works for the film were redone from scratch as production resumed in 2010. Green screen were used for the film which was later superimposed with 2D animated elements. Artists from Rocket Sheep were responsible for the creation of the futuristic Manila background, as well as the 2D animated monsters. The film was shot at KB Studios.

== Release ==
=== Theatrical run ===
Saving Sally was released in Philippine cinemas on December 25, 2016, as an official entry at the 2016 Metro Manila Film Festival. It was initially screened in 53 theaters across the Philippines but this figure increased to 65 theaters according to a December 28, 2016 report following calls and petitions for such a move. The filmmakers of Saving Sally launched an online social media campaign in Facebook calling theater owners to screen the film. Users has used the hashtags #ShowSavingSally and #ImSavingSally to show support for the film.

In a December 2016 interview with film writer, Sawit, it was mentioned that studios have approached the production team regarding the possible distribution of the film in television or online platforms similar to Netflix. In the same interview, it was revealed that the production team were invited to enter Saving Sally in four international film festivals with the first one to take place in March 2017. BBC News reports in January 2017, that distributors has offered the producers to release the film. The same reports that the film was invited to film festivals in Belgium, Spain, and Portugal.

=== Box office ===
The film was among the four least performing entries at the opening day of the 2016 Metro Manila Film Festival on December 25, 2016, in terms of box office. According to the official box office ranking released by the MMFF Executive Committee in January 2017, Saving Sally ranked fourth in Metro Manila, and fifth in the rest of the country.

On January 5, 2017, Star Cinema which is behind another entry in the MMFF, Vince and Kath and James, reported a ₱27 million overall box-office return.

=== Critical reception ===
Bubbles Salvador for Philippine Entertainment Portal wrote, "Saving Sally is the kind of film that grows on you—if you give it a chance." Jeeves de Veyra for ABS-CBN.com noted resemblance with the 2005 film MirrorMask, written by author Neil Gaiman. Furthermore, De Veyra wrote, "With its heart and brain on its sleeve, Saving Sally is like [Avid] Liongoren writing a love letter to its intended geek audience. [...] It is not a perfect movie but, in the moments where it shines, it absolutely dazzles." Arnel Ramos for Interaksyon.com wrote, "[Y]ou'll appreciate it even more if you've read The Little Prince, seen Scorsese's Hugo, and grew up loving E. B. White’s works to bits. But in the end, it is Liongoren and his team's creativity and artistry that inspire praise, that make you say, 'Great!' 'Lovely!' 'Magical,' 'A must-see.'"

Oggs Cruz of Rappler described it as "both a wonder and a rarity," and "an astounding achievement." Saving Sally was described by the critic as championing "simple love" and as an "escapist entertainment" that "doesn't pander to the most basic of sensations" noting that the film did not make use of "shortcuts with lowbrow humor or shoddy crafting". BBC News reports of Cruz's less positive yet sympathetic views for the film with Cruz reportedly saying that "the animated aspect in Saving Sally doesn't favour its commercial ability" despite noting that most Filipinos enjoy animated films. Cruz said that the animation element of the film was only adjunct to the main characters adding that this doesn't have an effect on the film's marketability. He sadly expressed his views that Saving Sally "won't entice children or adults", its filmmakers are in "a losing situation", and that the film will be pulled out in theaters in favor of "commercially viable" movies will garner more money.

The Cinema Evaluation Board of the Philippines gave Saving Sally an A grade. At the awards night of the Metro Manila Film Festival held on December 29, 2016, the film was the recipient of the "Best Musical Score" award.

=== Accolades ===
List of accolades
Award / Film Festival	Category	Recipient(s)	Result
Metro Manila Film Festival 2016
Metro Manila Film Festival 2016	Best Picture	Saving Sally	Nominated
Metro Manila Film Festival 2016	Best Director	Avid Liongoren	Nominated
Metro Manila Film Festival 2016	Best Screenplay	Saving Sally	Nominated
Metro Manila Film Festival 2016	Best Cinematography	Saving Sally	Nominated
Metro Manila Film Festival 2016	Best Production Design	Saving Sally	Nominated
Metro Manila Film Festival 2016	Best Editing	Saving Sally	Nominated
Metro Manila Film Festival 2016	Best Sound Design	Saving Sally	Nominated
Metro Manila Film Festival 2016	Best Musical Score	Saving Sally	Won
Fantasporto 2017	Special Jury Prize	Saving Sally	Won
Fantasporto 2017	Orient Express Section Special Jury Award	Saving Sally	Won
Fantasporto 2017	Audience Award	Saving Sally	Won
Asia Pacific Screen Awards 2017	Best Animated Feature Film	Saving Sally	Nominated
