= Ang Babae sa Septic Tank 2: ForeverIsNotEnough =

Ang Babae sa Septic Tank 2: Forever is Not Enough
- Theatrical release poster
- Directed by: Marlon Rivera
- Written by: Chris Martinez
- Produced by: Joji Alonso; Edgar Mangahas; Chris Martinez; Fernando Ortigas; Marlon Rivera; E.A. Rocha; John Victor Tence
- Starring: Jericho Rosales; Kean Cipriano; Cai Cortez; Khalil Ramos; Joel Torre; Eugene Domingo
- Cinematography: Lee Briones
- Edited by: Marya Ignacio
- Music by: Von de Guzman
- Production companies: Martinez Rivera Films; Quantum Films; Tuko Film Productions; Buchi Boy Films; MJM Productions
- Distributed by: Quantum Films (Philippines); ABS-CBN International (USA)
- Release date: December 25, 2016
- Running time: 90 minutes
- Country: Philippines
- Language: Filipino

Ang Babae sa Septic Tank 2: Forever is Not Enough (transl. The Woman in the Septic Tank 2; its subtitle stylized as #ForeverIsNotEnough) is a 2016 Filipino comedy film distributed by Quantum Films. It is the sequel to the 2011 film Ang Babae Sa Septic Tank. The film was directed by Marlon Rivera, written by Chris Martinez, and stars Eugene Domingo, Jericho Rosales, Kean Cipriano (as film director Rainier de la Cuesta), Cai Cortez (as Rainier's line producer, Jocelyn), Khalil Ramos and Joel Torre. While the first film was a satire on the Philippine indie film industry and the dishonesty of Filipino filmmakers participating in foreign film festivals, Ang Babae sa Septic Tank 2 satirizes the mainstream film industry.

The film was an official entry to the 2016 Metro Manila Film Festival.

== Cast ==
- Eugene Domingo as a fictionalized version of herself, an eccentric and demanding actress. Domingo also plays Romina, the lead in Rainier's new film The Itinerary.
- Jericho Rosales as a fictionalized version of himself, who Domingo wants as her love interest, Cesar, in The Itinerary.
- Joel Torre as himself, a renowned film actor who Rainier and Jocelyn want to portray Cesar.
- Kean Cipriano as Rainier de la Cuesta, a director who previously worked with Domingo in his independent film Walang Wala (With Nothing).
- Cai Cortez as Jocelyn, Rainier's line producer for The Itinerary and former production manager of Walang Wala.
- Khalil Ramos as Lennon, the young and silent production assistant of The Itinerary.
- Hannah Ledesma as Riza, Rainier's wife.
- Gui Adorno as Facundo, Domingo's Spanish assistant.
- Agot Isidro and Ricci Chan portray themselves as potential cast members of The Itinerary.
- Iñigo Pascual as himself as Domingo's final love interest in The Itinerary
- Joyce E. Bernal as herself as the rehashed The Itinerary's new director.

== Reception ==
Oggs Cruz of Rappler praised lead star Eugene Domingo stating that "Domingo, who plays the same hilariously histrionic version of herself from the first movie, wholeheartedly commits to Chris Martinez’s cleverly designed script that spells out his stark observations on how commercial romantic movies are so formulaic that even the performances in those films can be categorized." Bubbles Salvador of PEP commented that "despite using the same old formula for the sequel, the movie sees Eugene at her best, never appearing self-conscious about purposely overacting or contorting her body to deliver her exaggerated lines." Salvador concluded that "without being preachy, Ang Babae Sa Septic Tank 2 #ForeverIsNotEnough serves as an eye opener about the diversity of movie audiences, and that the conflict between commercial value and film quality is one that is not impossible to resolve over a period of time."

== Sequels ==
A third installment, titled Ang Babae sa Septic Tank 3: The Real Untold Story of Josephine Bracken, was released as a mockumentary TV series on ABS-CBN's streaming platform iWant, The series continues the story of Domingo as she creates her directorial debut film.

A fourth installment, titled Ang Babae sa Septic Tank 4: Oh Sh*t! It's Live sa Cheter!, was adapted as a stage play at the Philippine Educational Theater Association, and again stars Domingo in the same role.
