= Oro (film) =

- Theatrical release poster
- Directed by: Alvin Yapan
- Written by: Alvin Yapan
- Produced by: Feliz Guerrero; Mark Shandii Bacolod
- Starring: Irma Adlawan; Mercedes Cabral; Joem Bascon
- Cinematography: Ronald Rebutica
- Edited by: Benjamin Tolentino
- Music by: Harold Andre Cruz Santos; Hiroko Nagai
- Production company: Feliz Film Productions
- Distributed by: Solar Pictures
- Release date: December 25, 2016
- Running time: 110 minutes
- Country: Philippines
- Language: Filipino

Oro (transl. Gold) is a 2016 Filipino film written and directed by Alvin Yapan, starring Irma Adlawan, Mercedes Cabral, and Joem Bascon. The film, which was produced by Feliz Film Productions and distributed by Solar Pictures, was an official entry to the 2016 Metro Manila Film Festival. The film was based on the 2014 murder of four miners in Sitio Lahuy, Barangay Gata, Caramoan, Camarines Sur by armed members of Sagip Kalikasan Task Force, an environmental group formed in 2004 by former Camarines Sur governor Luis Villafuerte.

During its screening in the 2016 Metro Manila Film Festival, the film was criticized for scenes of animal cruelty, wherein a dog was shown beaten to death, disemboweled, cooked and eaten by the actors. An investigation conducted by the festival's executive committee found that a dog was indeed killed and disemboweled during filming but was not eaten by the actors. The executive committee ordered the producers to edit out the scenes of animal cruelty from the film. It also ordered the film's withdrawal from movie theaters and banned the film's director and producers from participating in the festival for one year. The animal welfare group Philippine Animal Welfare Society (PAWS) also filed a lawsuit against the film director and production company for violating the Philippine Animal Welfare Law.

== Plot ==
A secluded community dependent on mining is disrupted by an armed group who claims to be a representative of the government which causes a change in the traditional way of life of the community's residents. The community is led by a Barangay chairperson (Irma Adlawan) who decides to deal with the armed group exploiting their simple and previously undisturbed community.

== Cast ==
- Irma Adlawan as Kapitana
- Joem Bascon as Elmer
- Mercedes Cabral as Linda
- Nora Aunor as old Kapitana
- Sandino Martin as Cesar
- Sue Prado as Letty Razon
- Biboy Ramirez as Lando
- Cedrick Juan as Bong
- Timothy Castillo as Boy

== Production ==
=== Development and writing ===
Oro is largely based on a true story on killings which took place in 2014. The real life event now dubbed as the "Gata Four Massacre" involved the killing of four miners in Barangay Gata, Caramoan, Camarines Sur. In a March 2016 Bicol Today report, the alleged perpetrators were described as "enjoying freedom as employees of the Sagip Kalikasan Task Force" (SKTF). Alvin Yapan, the film's writer and director stated that significant parts of the event were fictionalized as a move of sensitivity to the case of the families of the victims. The SKTF for example, was fictionalized as the Patrol Kalikasan.

Camarines Sur Representative and Oro producer Wimpy Fuentebella approached Yapan to direct Oro. Yapan initially refused saying that he doesn't want to be involved in politics but later accepted the project after Fuentebella approached him again at the Ateneo de Manila University where Yapan teaches. Fuentebella appealed to Yapan to direct the film to advance an advocacy as an Atenean and Bicolano. Yapan asked for full creative control over the production of Oro and was assured that the film isn't a propaganda or a smear campaign.

=== Filming ===
The film was shot in the Sitio Lahuy, Barangay Gata, Caramoan, Camarines Sur, where the 2014 killings took place. Both residents and non-residents participated as extras in the making of the film. Some of the extras were later found out by Yapan to be relatives of the victims and the director expressed reluctance saying that their participation may worsen their trauma from the killings. The victims' relatives insisted to be part of the film saying to the production team that it is their story and the film is them. Yapan described the experience of the victims' relatives working with the film as seemingly therapeutic adding that they "kept silent about the entire thing and now people are actually interested in the material so this is their chance to speak. And their way of speaking is to act a particular thing that they actually experienced"

== Reception ==
=== Box office ===
Oro is among the four least performing films in terms of box office sales during the opening day of the 2016 Metro Manila Film Festival on 25 December 2016. After reports of animal cruelty in the film came out, the festival's executive ordered the movie withdrawn from movie theaters beginning 4 January 2017.

=== Critical response ===
Notwithstanding scenes of animal cruelty in the film, the film received positive reviews from several movie critics. Oggs Cruz of Rappler called the film a "power discourse". He writes: "The film, however, is not just about injustice, which is quite an obvious concept. It is about the fickle nature of justice, of the impossibility of organized society to pinpoint with exactitude what equates as just in a world of multiple advocacies and perspectives. This is what makes the film overwhelmingly compelling."

Don Jaucian, writing for CNN Philippines said, "Yapan skillfully weaves the details of the town’s life through little stories of faith and redemption, stories that build up to a riveting portrait of greed, corruption, and helplessness."

Camille Anne Arcilla, writing for BusinessWorld said, "Heavy as it may seem for Christmas entertainment, but it leaves a mark to the audience, not just as a moviegoer, but also as a member of a society."

Bubbles Salvador of the Philippine Entertainment Portal called the film "intelligent, relevant, real" and adds that Yapan brilliantly tackles the issues that need to be brought to light in a film that has the elements an ordinary moviegoer looks for: a tight storyline, characters one can relate to, and a lesson at the end.

=== Accolades ===
The film was nominated for 10 awards in the 2016 Metro Manila Film Festival. During the festival's awards night on 29 December 2016 held at the Kia Theater in Quezon City, the film's lead actress, Irma Adlawan won the Best Actress award for her role as Kapitana. The film's cast also won Best Ensemble while the film received the Fernando Poe, Jr. Memorial Award for Excellence, which was later revoked after reports of animal cruelty in the film surfaced.

Award	Recipient	Result
Best Picture		Nominated
Best Actor	Joem Bascon	Nominated
Best Actress	Irma Adlawan	Won
Best Supporting Actor	Cedrick Juan	Nominated
Best Supporting Actress	Mercedes Cabral	Nominated
Best Ensemble Cast		Won
Best Cinematography	Roland Rebutica	Nominated
Best Sound Design	Harold Andre Cruz Santos and Hiroko Nagai	Nominated
Fernando Poe Jr. Memorial Award		Won (Withdrawn)
Best Original Theme Song	Nananaghoy ang Puso Ko by Tonton Hernandez	Nominated

== Criticism ==
=== Animal cruelty during filming ===
The scene in the film which depicts members of Patrol Kalikasan taking a dog of a villager to later slaughter and cook it elicited controversy. Animal rights group Philippine Animal Welfare Society (PAWS) criticized the inclusion of the scene and alleged that the dog was actually killed in real life. PAWS called for an investigation regarding the certain scene saying that those involved are liable under Republic Act 8485 or the Animal Welfare Act. They pointed out that there was no permit application filed to the Bureau of Animal Industry and the Committee on Animal Welfare by either the filmmakers or the indigenous community. PAWS also added that if the dog slaughter was not deliberately filmed by the filmmakers, they said that the production team of Oro should have reported the incident instead of using the footage as part of their feature film.

Yapan stated that neither he or a member of the film's cast were involved in the killing of the dog and that the production team only documented a "culture of violence" in a remote portion of the country.

Following a closed-door meeting with the MMFF Executive Committee, the filmmakers and PAWS decided to censor or edit out the scene in question, as well as include an advisory warning viewers of graphic content, which they described as a "compromise". PAWS expressed disappointment in the decision, saying that the move "does not change the fact that a dog was killed" for the film describing the events in the scene as "a crime committed". The group also criticized the MMFF committee for not pulling out the film entirely alleging that they hide under a "technicality" in such that the production team of Oro was not directly involved in the killing of the dog. PAWS said that a "degree of ethics" dictates that the film makers should not have used the footage for their work.

Yapan expressed disappointment and noted that public attention regarding the film would be more directed to the dog slaughter scene rather than the case of the Gata 4 Massacre.

On 3 January 2017, the MMFF Executive Committee revoked the Fernando Poe Jr Memorial Award from Oro after a consultation with the family of Fernando Poe Jr. They said that "without making any judgment on the artistic merit of the film or cinematic depiction", the controversy regarding the alleged killing of a dog in the making of Oro "effectively casts a doubt on the movie's ability to exemplify the human and cultural values espoused by the late Fernando Poe, Jr."

On 24 January 2017, veteran actress Nora Aunor denounced the filmmakers by calling them "liars" for denying that a dog was killed during the shooting of the film. Both Aunor and Yapan attended the hearing of the Senate committee on public information and mass media over different issues concerning the Metro Manila Film Festival (MMFF). Yapan said nobody from the crew killed a dog. Aunor, however, refuted Yapan's statement, saying it was stated in the script that one dog will be killed. She earlier said that two dogs will be killed but then clarified the matter later on during the hearing. The actress also complained of not receiving a formal notice from the director nor the producer that she will no longer continue on with the project, despite already having attended a story conference.

Senator Grace Poe, chair of the Senate panel conducting the hearing, gave Yapan an opportunity to apologize over the incident.
