= Kabisera =

- Theatrical release poster
- Directed by: Arturo San Agustin; Real Florido
- Written by: Real Florido
- Produced by: Arturo San Agustin; RJ Agustin
- Starring: Nora Aunor; Ricky Davao; JC de Vera; Jason Abalos
- Cinematography: Topel Lee
- Edited by: Tara Illenberger
- Music by: Vincent de Jesus
- Production companies: Firestarters Productions; Silver Story Entertainment
- Release date: December 25, 2016
- Running time: 110 minutes
- Country: Philippines
- Language: Filipino

Kabisera (English: The Seat) is a 2016 Filipino sociopolitical drama film starring Nora Aunor and Ricky Davao. The film is directed by Arturo San Agustin and Real Florido, and was produced under Silver Story Entertainment and Fire Starters Productions.

The film was selected to be an official entry to the 2016 Metro Manila Film Festival.

== Plot ==
A Filipino family deals with hooded people who are involved in extra-judicial killings and other abuses in Philippine society.

== Cast ==
- Nora Aunor
- Ricky Davao
- JC de Vera
- Jason Abalos
- RJ Agustin
- Victor Neri
- Ronwaldo Martin
- Ces Quesada
- Perla Bautista
- Menggie Cobarrubias
- Alex San Agustin
- Kiko Matos
- Karl Medina
- Edwin Reyes
- Coleen Perez
- Rhen Escaño
