= Die Beautiful =

2016 LGBT drama film by Jun Robles Lana

- Theatrical release poster
- Directed by: Jun Robles Lana
- Screenplay by: Rody Vera
- Story by: Jun Robles Lana
- Produced by: Jun Robles Lana; Ferdinand Lapuz
- Starring: Paolo Ballesteros; Christian Bables; Joel Torre; Gladys Reyes; Luis Alandy; Albie Casiño
- Cinematography: Carlo Mendoza
- Edited by: Benjamin Tolentino
- Music by: Richard Gonzales
- Production companies: Octobertrain Films; The IdeaFirst Company
- Distributed by: Regal Entertainment
- Release dates: October 27, 2016 (Tokyo); December 25, 2016 (MMFF)
- Running time: 120 minutes
- Country: Philippines
- Languages: Filipino; English
- Budget: ₱15 million
- Box office: ₱98 million (Official 2016 MMFF run) ₱110 million (Official Worldwide Run)

Die Beautiful is a Filipino LGBT comedy-drama film co-produced and directed by Jun Robles Lana and written by Rody Vera from Lana's story concept. It stars Paolo Ballesteros as Trisha, a trans woman who suddenly died after she was crowned winner of a gay beauty pageant, and her friends, who transform her into a different person on each night of her wake in a different location as a way to avoid being buried as a man by her father. It also tackles her whole life when she felt and dealt with problems and successes in living as a Filipina transgender, as well as controversy in her family.

Produced by Octobertrain Films and The IdeaFirst Company and distributed by Regal Entertainment, the film premiered in Tokyo, Japan, on October 27, 2016, as a competing entry for the 29th Tokyo International Film Festival. It received a domestic theatrical release on December 25, as an official entry to the 42nd Metro Manila Film Festival.

== Plot ==
Trisha Echevarria is a trans woman whose sexuality is greatly opposed by her father, causing her to leave their house and live with her best friend, Barbs.

The film starts at Trisha's wake. She died after she was crowned as Binibining Gay Pilipinas. Every day during her wake, Trisha transforms into a different female celebrity through Barbs's skills in putting makeup. When Trisha was alive, the two enjoyed doing makeup transformations together.

Iza Calzado, who crowned Trisha during her final pageant, visits the wake at the time when Trisha is wearing makeup that depicts her. During Trisha's transformation as Miley Cyrus, the funeral parlor owner, Flora, takes a selfie with her and uploads it online. The photo goes viral, inadvertently making Trisha's wake an attraction, much to Barbs's disapproval. Couturier Maumau Zaldriaga also visits the wake and brings a white gown for Trisha to wear during her transformation as Julia Roberts from Runaway Bride.

Throughout the film, several flashbacks of Trisha's life are shown. During her teenage years, Trisha, then using the name Patrick, studied at the same school as Barbs. Patrick has a crush on Migs, a basketball player, and goes out with him one night after Barbs' encouragement. There, he is gangraped by a drunk Migs and his friends, causing anal bleeding on Patrick. His father visits him in the hospital together with his sister Beth, and finds out about what happened. Enraged, Patrick's father slaps him.

Patrick's relationship with his father is further strained as Patrick begins entering gay beauty pageants in secret. This leads his father to disown him. As he leaves, Patrick announces his new identity: Trisha Echeverria.

With nowhere else to go, Trisha moves in with Barbs, with Ruby, Barbs's mother's approval. She adopts an orphaned child named Adora, giving her a new name, Shirley Mae. Jobless, Trisha and Barbs continued to enter different pageants. Trisha often loses during the question-and-answer portion of these pageants. She then gets breast implants, thinking that it will help her win pageants.

Trisha dates a young gay club dancer named Miko. She even pays for Miko's rhinoplasty, but soon learns that Miko is having an affair with a gay beauty parlor owner, ending their relationship.

Trisha meets Jesse at a bar. Although Jesse is married, they start dating. On their sixth monthiversary, Jesse fails to arrive. A month later, Jesse's wife Diana, invites Trisha to the hospital where Jesse was confined due to leukemia. Jesse tells Trisha about his condition and confesses that their meeting was not accidental. His conscience urges Jesse as he was part of the group who gangraped Trisha during their teenage years. Although he tells Trisha that he grew to love her, Trisha is left distraught by the revelation and promptly leaves.

Trisha then joined Binibining Gay Pilipinas and picked a question she had encountered before. She delivers her memorized answer well: saying that if she dies and gets to live again, she would choose to be nobody but herself. While backstage, Trisha jokingly tells Barbs that if she won the pageant, she is ready to die. She further envisions her wake to have a makeover as different celebrities every day. Trisha finally wins but dies shortly of cerebral aneurysm.

In the morgue, Trisha's father and sister arrive. Her father orders Trisha's breast implants removed. Beth disagrees. Their father ends up having Trisha dressed in a barong Tagalog, a traditional men's garment. Barbs, Paola, and Erica are disappointed at the sight of their friend and ask for Beth's help to sneak out Trisha's corpse and give her the burial she wished for.

On the last day of her wake, Barbs announces that the final makeover of Trisha is who she really is: the Trisha they knew, who lived a glamorous life. The movie ends with Trisha's final walk message, showing a younger version of herself.

Other celebrity transformations of Trisha during her wake are Angelina Jolie, Lady Gaga, and Beyoncé.

== Cast ==
=== Main cast ===
- Paolo Ballesteros as Trisha Echevarria/Patrick Villar
- Christian Bables as Barbs Cordero, Trisha's best friend and make-up artist

=== Supporting cast ===
- Joel Torre as Mr. Villar, Patrick's father
- Gladys Reyes as Beth Villar, Patrick/Trisha's older sister
- Luis Alandy as Jesse
- Albie Casiño as Migs
- Faye Alhambra as Adora/Shirley Mae - Ella's daughter and Trisha's adoptive daughter
- Inah de Belen as teenaged Shirley Mae
- IC Mendoza as Paola
- Cedrick Juan as Erika
- Lou Veloso as Mama Flora
- Mimi Juareza as Mother Celine

=== Guest cast ===
- Iza Calzado as herself
- Eugene Domingo as Maumau Zaldriaga, a famous couturier
- Mel Martinez as gay parlor owner
- Jade Lopez as Diana, Jesse's ex-wife
- Adrianna So as Malak, Migs’ girlfriend
- Lao Rodriguez as Badong, Maumau Zaldriaga's security guard
- Kokoy de Santos as Michael Angelo or "Miko", Trisha's ex-boyfriend
- Lui Manansala as Ruby Cordero, Barbs's mother
- Erlinda Villalobos as Aling Vargie, Ella's mother and Adora/Shirley Mae's grandmother

== Production ==
Die Beautiful is a film funded by Hong Kong – Asia Financing Forum and produced by Regal Entertainment, The IdeaFirst Company, and Octobertrain Films. The film was directed by Jun Robles Lana and produced by Lily Monteverde, Roselle Monteverde and Perci Intalan.

== Release ==
Die Beautiful was selected in the Main Competition of the Tokyo International Film Festival, which ran from October 25, 2016, to November 3, 2016.

The film is an official entry to the 42nd Metro Manila Film Festival, and was screened at the 2017 Luang Prabang Film Festival.

== Reception ==
At the awarding ceremony at the Tokyo International Film Festival, which was held on November 3, 2016, at the Toho Cinemas in Roppongi Hills in Japan, Paolo Ballesteros was named the festival's Best Actor. The film also won the Audience Choice Award.

The jury was headed by French director Jean-Jacques Beineix, and included Hong Kong director Mabel Cheung, U.S. producer Nicole Rocklin, Italian actor Valerio Mastandrea, and Japanese director Hideyuki Hirayama.

A total of 16 films, with Die Beautiful being the only one from the Philippines, competed.

=== Accolades ===
Year	Award	Category	Recipient	Result
2016	29th Tokyo International Film Festival	Audience Choice Award	Die Beautiful	Won
2016	29th Tokyo International Film Festival	Best Actor	Paolo Ballesteros	Won
2016	21st International Film Festival of Kerala	Special Jury Award for Outstanding Performance	Paolo Ballesteros	Won
2016	2016 Metro Manila Film Festival	Best Picture	Die Beautiful	Nominated
2016	2016 Metro Manila Film Festival	Best Director	Jun Lana	Nominated
2016	2016 Metro Manila Film Festival	Best Actor	Paolo Ballesteros	Won
2016	2016 Metro Manila Film Festival	Best Supporting Actor	Christian Bables	Won
2016	2016 Metro Manila Film Festival	Best Supporting Actress	Gladys Reyes	Nominated
2016	2016 Metro Manila Film Festival	Best Ensemble Cast	Die Beautiful	Nominated
2016	2016 Metro Manila Film Festival	Best Screenplay	Rody Vera	Nominated
2016	2016 Metro Manila Film Festival	Best Production Design	Angel Diesta	Nominated
2016	2016 Metro Manila Film Festival	Best Float	Die Beautiful	Won
2016	2016 Metro Manila Film Festival	MMFF My Most Favorite Film	Die Beautiful	Won
2017	Film Development Council of the Philippines	Film Ambassadors Awardee	Paolo Ballesteros and Jun Lana	Won
2017	19th Gawad Pasado Awards	Pinakapasadong Pelikula sa Kamalayang Pagkakapantay-pantay ng mga Kasarian	Die Beautiful	Won
2017	19th Gawad Pasado Awards	Natatanging Gawad Pasado para sa Taong 2016	Paolo Ballesteros	Won
2017	15th Gawad Tanglaw Awards	Best Actor	Paolo Ballesteros	Won
2017	Guild of Educators, Mentors and Students	Best Actor	Paolo Ballesteros	Won
2017	Gawad Bedista Awards 2017	Actor of the Year (Film)	Paolo Ballesteros	Won
2017	48th GMMSF Box-Office Entertainment Awards	Global Achievement by a Filipino Artist (Tokyo Best Actor)	Paolo Ballesteros	Won
2017	1st Eddys Awards (Entertainment Editors' Choice Awards for Movies)	Best Actor	Paolo Ballesteros	Won
2017	1st Eddys Awards (Entertainment Editors' Choice Awards for Movies)	Best Editing	Die Beautiful	Won
2017	1st Eddys Awards (Entertainment Editors' Choice Awards for Movies)	Best Production Design	Die Beautiful	Won
2017	40th Gawad Urian Awards	Best Actor	Paolo Ballesteros	Won
2017	40th Gawad Urian Awards	Best Supporting Actor	Christian Bables	Won
2017	40th Gawad Urian Awards	Best Production Design	Angel Diesta	Nominated
2017	40th Gawad Urian Awards	Best Editing	Benjamin Gonzales Tolentino	Nominated
2017	33rd PMPC Star Awards for Movies	Movie of the Year	Die Beautiful	Won
2017	33rd PMPC Star Awards for Movies	Movie Director of the Year	Jun Lana	Won
2017	33rd PMPC Star Awards for Movies	Movie Actor of the Year	Paolo Ballesteros	Nominated
2017	33rd PMPC Star Awards for Movies	Movie Supporting Actor of the Year	Christian Bables	Nominated
2017	33rd PMPC Star Awards for Movies	New Movie Actor of the Year	Christian Bables	Nominated
2017	33rd PMPC Star Awards for Movies	Movie Screenwriter of the Year	Rody Vera	Won
2017	33rd PMPC Star Awards for Movies	Movie Cinematographer of the Year	Carlo Mendoza	Won
2017	33rd PMPC Star Awards for Movies	Movie Production Designer of the Year	Angel Diesta	Nominated
2017	33rd PMPC Star Awards for Movies	Movie Editor of the Year	Benjamin Tolentino	Won
2017	33rd PMPC Star Awards for Movies	Movie Musical Scorer of the Year	Richard Gonzales	Nominated
2017	33rd PMPC Star Awards for Movies	Movie Sound Engineer of the Year	Armand De Guzman and Lamberto Casas Jr.	Nominated
2018	5th Paragala Central Luzon Media Awards	Best Film	Die Beautiful	Won
2018	5th Paragala Central Luzon Media Awards	Best Actor	Paolo Ballesteros	Won
2018	Newcastle International Film Festival	Best Feature Prize	Die Beautiful	Won

== Sequel ==
It was announced that a sequel was in production to be a 12-part spin-off television series to be aired on Cignal Play entitled Born Beautiful with Paolo Ballesteros reprising his role and Martin del Rosario picking up the role of Barbs which was originally portrayed by Christian Bables. Instead, the producers decided to make it into a full-length film with the majority of the story focusing on Barbs.

A musical adaptation of the film, titled Die Beautiful: The Musical, is scheduled for release in 2026. Drag Race Philippines alumni Maxie Anderson and Viñas Deluxe are double-cast to star as the lead Trisha.
