= Seklusyon =

2016 film by Erik Matti

- Theatrical release poster
- Directed by: Erik Matti
- Written by: Anton C. Santamaria
- Produced by: Erik Matti; Ronald Stephen Monteverde
- Starring: Rhed Bustamante; Neil Ryan Sese; Ronnie Alonte; Lou Veloso; Phoebe Walker; Dominic Roque; Elora Españo; John Vic De Guzman; JR Versales; Jerry O'Hara; Sherry Lara; Teroy Guzman
- Cinematography: Neil Bion
- Edited by: Jay Halili
- Music by: Francis de Veyra
- Production company: Reality Entertainment
- Release date: December 25, 2016
- Running time: 90 minutes
- Country: Philippines
- Language: Filipino
- Box office: ₱100 million

Seklusyon (lit. 'Seclusion') is a 2016 Filipino Gothic supernatural horror film co-produced and directed by Erik Matti. The film is under the production of Reality Entertainment. It stars Rhed Bustamante, Neil Ryan Sese, Ronnie Alonte, Lou Veloso, Phoebe Walker, Dominic Roque, Elora Españo, John Vic De Guzman, JR Versales, Jerry O'Hara, Sherry Lara and Teroy Guzman. The film follows a group of deacons who undergo a week of seclusion in a remote monastery, where a mysterious girl's supposed miracles test their faith and reveal hidden evils.

The film is Erik Matti's third MMFF entry in recent years after his 2014 film Kubot: The Aswang Chronicles 2, and 2015 film Honor Thy Father which was the subject of controversy that year when it was disqualified from the "Best Picture" category of the festival's award. It is an official entry to the 2016 Metro Manila Film Festival, where it won 9 categories, including "Best Director" award for Erik Matti.

== Plot ==
In 1947, Padre Ricardo arrives at a marketplace to investigate people whose ailments were miraculously healed by a child named Anghela Santa Ana, who is assisted by a mysterious nun, Sister Cecilia. Ricardo becomes suspicious of Anghela's powers as every time she heals someone, a black liquid drips from her mouth.

Miguel, a deacon, arrives at a monastery and meets Sandoval, a former priest who was excommunicated. Sandoval tells him about an old custom where temporary deacons and aspiring priests are sequestered at the very end of their training, as it is believed in the last seven days they are most vulnerable to demonic influence. While in seclusion, Miguel meets his fellow deacons, Carlo, Fabián, and Marco.

While in a church, Padre Ricardo discovers a bloodied Anghela, her parents having been murdered. The local bishop orders that Anghela and Sister Cecilia be housed in the same monastery as the secluded deacons, despite Ricardo's protests due to his suspicions of Sister Cecilia. However, the bishop allows Ricardo to continue his investigation. Sandoval at first refuses to let Anghela and Sister Cecilia stay, saying they will disturb the deacons’ training, but later begrudgingly agrees when told the bishop orders their stay. Anghela uses her powers to make their bread edible again after it had gone moldy and stale, as well as turning tap water into wine. The deacons, except Miguel, are amazed by her powers, deeming them miraculous.

During their stay, the deacons are plagued by recurring nightmares based on their sins: Marco's gluttony caused his siblings to die from starvation in the recently ended Second World War; Fabián's entry into the priesthood was his escape from a physically abusive mother; and Miguel is taunted by his dead ex-lover, Erina, in a grotesque form of Our Lady of Sorrows. One night, Anghela goes to the kitchen to ask Sandoval for food and water, and later on, discusses his excommunication. As Anghela convinces him that he was innocent of his sins, Sandoval departs the next morning, thanking the girl and leaving the deacons under her charge.

In the course of his investigation, Padre Ricardo arrives at a convent to question its Mother Superior about Sister Cecilia. Despite her rudeness, the Mother Superior willingly gives him Cecilia's records, but warns him to stop investigating and never return. The records state that Cecilia was gang raped during the War, and part of her face was burned. She later became Anghela's teacher; it is implied that Anghela healed her wounds. He also discovers that Anghela was raised in an orphanage and was adopted. To Ricardo's surprise, one document appeared to have the name "NgaHela" written on it, an anagram of “Anghela” and is said to be the name of the Devil incarnate. The document further explains that Anghela's healing and miraculous powers come not from God, but the Devil. With this evidence of Anghela as a false prophet and Cecilia being one of her minions, Ricardo visits the bishop to warn him of Anghela's true nature, but at the same moment, Sandoval bursts into the room and shoots the bishop dead. He informs a shocked Ricardo about Anghela's whereabouts and that she is waiting for him.

As the deacons finish their training, Anghela convinces them to redeem themselves from their sins by feeding their vices, sometimes using Sister Cecilia as a pawn for her schemes. Marco indulges his gluttony; Fabián is revealed to be abusive towards women due to the abuse he received from his mother; while Carlo is revealed to be a pedophile. During a Black Mass held by Anghela in the monastery chapel, Miguel unsuccessfully tries to convince the other deacons that she must not be trusted. He angrily denounces Anghela a false prophet and runs into the woods, where he is followed by Anghela, Cecilia, and the three deacons. During the chase, Miguel trips and is knocked unconscious. A flashback shows Miguel's relationship with Erina, whom he left pregnant with their child to enter the priesthood. Betrayed and heartbroken, Erina hanged herself after giving birth. Anghela sees Miguel and heals his head wound, and on waking he realizes she is his daughter. At the chapel, Anghela resumes her satanic liturgy and has the four deacons drink from a chalice filled with the black liquid. Miguel does so, but is still doubtful.

Padre Ricardo finally confronts Anghela and tries to exorcise her, only to be burned to death by her powers. Miguel seizes Anghela, takes her to the chapel, and barricades the door. There, Anghela reveals herself as the demon NgaHela, who plots to control the Catholic Church; those whom she has healed become her disciples and worshippers. As Sister Cecilia and the three deacons try to break down the door, Miguel grabs a knife and stabs Anghela several times. Black liquid drips out from her mouth as she slowly dies, while Miguel escapes, never to be seen again.

The film ends with Fabián, Carlo, and Marco being ordained to the priesthood by a new bishop, who is unaware they were consecrated not to God, but the Devil.

== Cast ==
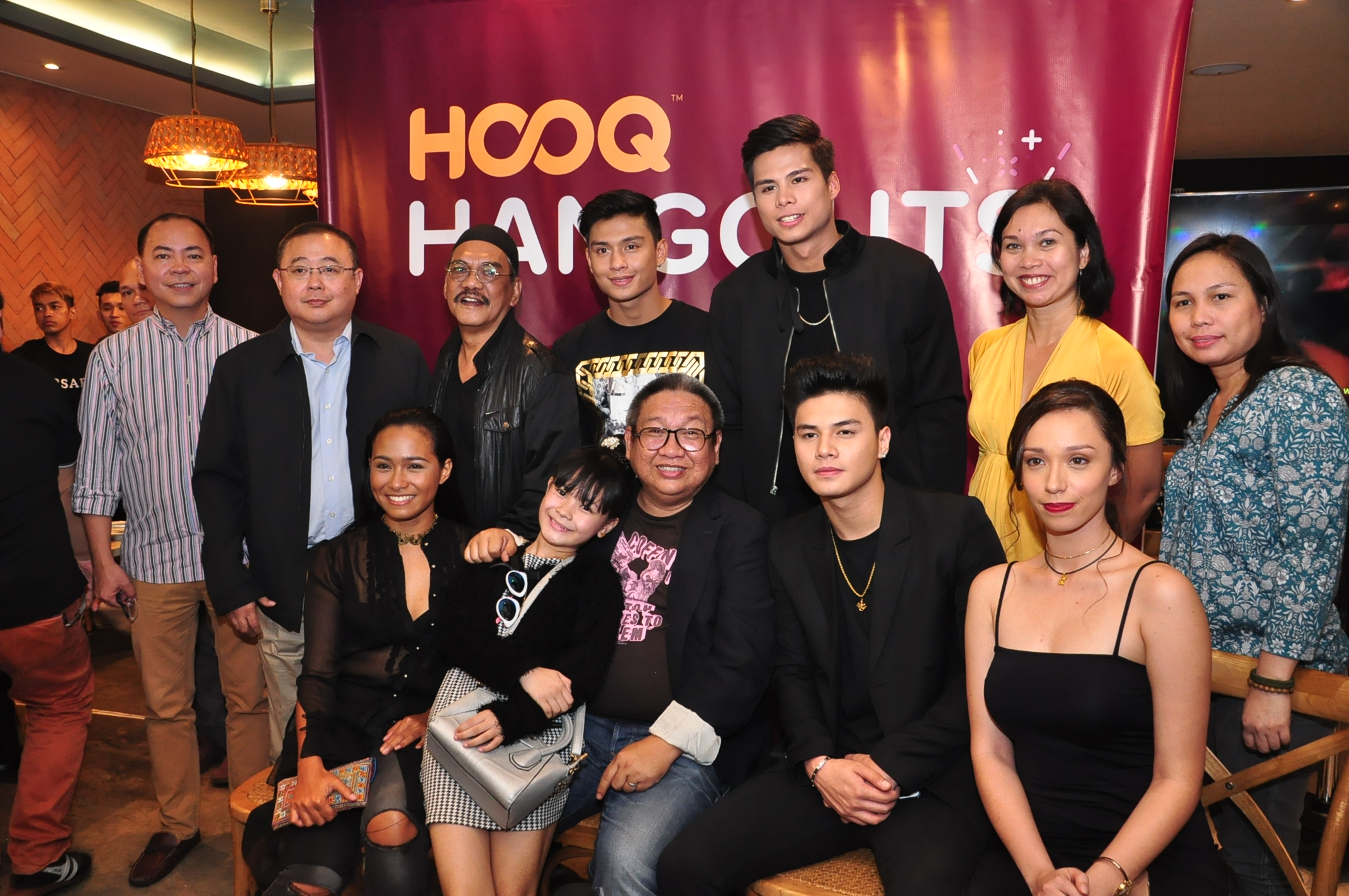
The cast of Seklusyon with director Erik Matti (middle).

- Ronnie Alonte as Miguel
- Rhed Bustamante as Anghela Santa Ana / Anghela
- Neil Ryan Sese as Father Ricardo
- Lou Veloso as Sandoval
- Phoebe Walker as Sister Cecilia
- Dominic Roque as Fabián
- Elora Españo as Erina
- John Vic De Guzman as Marco
- JR Versales as Carlo
- Teroy Guzman as Father Francisco
- Jerry O'Hara as Obispo
- Sherry Lara as Mother Superior

== Production ==
The production team of Seklusyon avoided special effects to make the film as realistic as possible.

Touch hubs were used, but no computer-generated characters were used for the film.

== Reception ==
Jill Tan Radovan of Interaksyon.com writes, "Seklusyon succeeds at being the ‘real horror movie’ that its creators—Reality Entertainment and Eric Matti [sic]—intended it to be [...] Taken literally, it sends goosebumps up one’s spine." Mari-an Santos for Philippine Entertainment Portal writes, "The undeniable Erik Matti ending makes [Seklusyon] worth the time, making audiences think and see the world outside with a new set of eyes."

Clarence Tsui for The Hollywood Reporter writes, “Seclusion drips with a ferocity about how false messiahs manipulate meek minds who, as the film's finale suggests, then propel even more malicious pretenders onto the pedestals of power. The film is Matti's call for an awakening, and it certainly stirs with spine-tingling moments aplenty."

Oggs Cruz of Rappler gave a balanced review. While praising the film as being "immensely intriguing" and "curiously elegant", he feels that the screenplay is awkwardly paced and Ronnie Alonte's performance was wanting.

== See also ==
- List of ghost films

== Accolades ==
Awards
Year	Award	Category	Recipient(s)	Outcome
2016	42nd Metro Manila Film Festival	Best Director	Erik Matti	Won
2016	42nd Metro Manila Film Festival	Best Child Actress	Rhed Bustamante	Nominated
2016	42nd Metro Manila Film Festival	Best Supporting Actress	Phoebe Walker	Won
2016	42nd Metro Manila Film Festival	Best Supporting Actor	Lou Veloso	Nominated
2016	42nd Metro Manila Film Festival	Best Cinematography	Neil Bion	Won
2016	42nd Metro Manila Film Festival	Best Screenplay	Anton Santamaria	Won
2016	42nd Metro Manila Film Festival	Best Sound Design	Albert Michael Idioma & Lamberto Casas Jr.	Won
2016	42nd Metro Manila Film Festival	Best Production Design	Ericson Navarro	Won
2016	42nd Metro Manila Film Festival	Best Editing	Jay Halili	Nominated
2016	42nd Metro Manila Film Festival	Best Musical Score	Francis de Veyra	Nominated
2016	42nd Metro Manila Film Festival	Best Original Theme Song	"Dominus Miserere" by Francis De Veyra	Won
2016	42nd Metro Manila Film Festival	Special Jury Prize	Rhed Bustamante	Won
2016	42nd Metro Manila Film Festival	Male Celebrity of the Night	Ronnie Alonte	Won
