= List of Philippine films of 2016 =

This is an incomplete list of Filipino full-length films, both mainstream and independently produced, released in theaters and cinemas in 2016.

== Box office ==
The highest-grossing Filipino films released in 2016, are as follows:

- – a Metro Manila Film Festival entry film

Rank	Title	Distributor	Box office
1	The Super Parental Guardians	Star Cinema	₱598 million
2	Barcelona: A Love Untold	Star Cinema	₱321 million
3	The Unmarried Wife	Star Cinema	₱246.3 million
4	Just the 3 of Us	Star Cinema	₱230 million
5	Everything About Her	Star Cinema	₱208 million
6	Imagine You and Me	GMA Pictures, APT Entertainment, M-Zet Productions	₱198 million
7	Vince and Kath and James	Star Cinema	₱123 million
8	This Time	Viva Films	₱120 million
9	Camp Sawi	Viva Films, N^{2} Productions	₱120 million
10	Die Beautiful	Regal Entertainment, Octobertrain Films, The IdeaFirst Company	₱110 million
11	The Third Party	Star Cinema	₱110 million
12	Always Be My Maybe	Star Cinema	₱105 million
13	Seklusyon	Reality Entertainment	₱100 million
14	#WalangForever	Quantum Films, Star Cinema	₱100 million

== Films ==
=== January–March ===
Color key

- – a Singkwento International Film Festival film
- – a CineFilipino entry film

Opening	Title	Production outfit	Cast and crew	Genre	Source
January 13	Lumayo Ka Nga Sa Akin	Viva Films, Heaven's Best Entertainment	Andoy Ranay, Chris Martinez, Mark Meily (directors); Cristine Reyes, Maricel Soriano, Herbert Bautista, Benjie Paras, Candy Pangilinan	Comedy	
January 27	Everything About Her	Star Cinema	Joyce Bernal (director); Vilma Santos, Angel Locsin, Xian Lim	Comedy, Drama	
February 3	#Lakbay2Love	Erasto Films	Ellen Ongkeko-Marfil (director); Solenn Heussaff, Dennis Trillo, Kit Thompson	Romance	
February 10	Girlfriend for Hire	Viva Films	Vanessa De Leon (director); Yassi Pressman, Andre Paras	Romantic comedy	
February 10	Love is Blind	Regal Entertainment	Jason Paul Laxamana (director); Derek Ramsay, Solenn Heussaff, Kean Cipriano, Kiray Celis	Romantic comedy	
February 12	Butanding	Cinemaworld International	Ed Palmos (director); Lourdes Duque-Baron; Precious Lara Quigaman	Drama	
February 17	Tupang Ligaw	BG Productions International	Rod Santiago (director); Matteo Guidicelli, Rico Barrera, Paolo Contis, Ara Mina, Suzette Ranillo	Action	
February 19	Laut	BG Productions International	Louie Ignacio (director); Barbie Forteza, Gabbi Garcia, Rodjun Cruz	Biographical	
February 20	Beyond The Door	GroundHit Productions	Franco Arce (director); Mara Lopez, Ervic Vijandre, Archie Alemania, Cholo Barretto, Alvin Anson	Thriller, Mystery	
February 20	Padre de Familia	CCM Creatives, Outpost Visual Frontier, Toast Productions Inc., Imaginary Friends Studios, Star Cinema	Adolfo Alix Jr. (director); Coco Martin, Nora Aunor, Julia Montes	Drama	
February 20	Pisara	D' Great Rovers Entertainment	DA Palagtiw (director); Ritz Azul, Ahron Villena, Regine Angeles, Ruby Ruiz	Biographical	
February 21	Ang Sugarol	Shooting Up Productions	Jojo Nadela (director); Flora Gasser, Jennifer Dabu, Salvador Arguelles, Roden Araneta	Biographical	
February 22	Partee	365 Dragon Films	Jill Urdaneta (director); Felix Roco, Kiko Matos, Angela Cortez	Drama	
February 24	Always Be My Maybe	Star Cinema	Dan Villegas (director); Gerald Anderson, Arci Muñoz, Jane Oineza, Cacai Bautista, Ricci Chan, TJ Trinidad	Romantic comedy	
February 26	Atras		Johnny Mahinay (director); Matt Mabagal, Raycien Caberte, Badidi Labra, Jepjep de Paula, Dulcita Batausa Siroy	Thriller, Suspense	
February 25	Ligaw	Light Cinema	Paolo Tesico (director); Melissa Ricks, Eva Darren, Crispin Pineda, Zeppi Borromeo	Thriller, Mystery	
February 27	Sekyu	BG Productions International	Joel Lamangan (director); Allen Dizon, Sunshine Dizon, Melai Cantiveros, Rez Cortez	Drama	
March 9	Iadya Mo Kami	BG Productions International	Mel Chionglo (director); Allen Dizon, Eddie Garcia, Aiko Melendez, Ricky Davao, Diana Zubiri	Drama, Religious	
March 16	1st Sem	Team Campry Entertainment	Dexter Hemedez, Allan Ibañez (directors); Lotlot De Leon, Allan Paule, Darwin Yu, Miguel Bagtas, Sebastian Vargas, Jr., Karen Romualdez, Teri Lacayanga, Maddie Martinez, Sachie Yu, Marc Paloma	Drama	
March 16	A Lotto Like Love		Carla Baful (director); Isabelle de Leon, Martin Escudero	Romance	
March 16	Ang Taba Ko Kasi	Kamaru Productions	Jason Paul Laxamana (director); Cai Cortez, Ryan Yllana, Mark Neumann	Romantic comedy	
March 16	Ang Tulay ng San Sebastian	Rolyo Productions, Black Maria Pictures	Alvin Yapan (director); Joem Bascon, Sandino Martin	Horror, Suspense	
March 16	Buhay Habangbuhay	Meganon Comics, OLE ELITE Entertainment, HUB2.0	Paolo Herras (director); Iza Calzado, Jake Macapagal, Meryll Soriano, Rocky Salumbides	Comedy	
March 16	Ned's Project		Lemuel Lorca (director); Angeli Bayani, Max Eigenmann, Lui Quiambao-Manansala, Biboy Ramirez	Drama	
March 16	Sakaling Hindi Makarating	Media East Productions	Ice Idanan (director); Alessandra de Rossi, Therese Malvar, Pepe Herrera	Drama	
March 16	Star na si Van Damme Stallone		Randolph Longjas (director); Candy Pangilinan, Paolo Pinggol, Neil Ryan Sese, Erlinda Villalobos	Drama, Comedy	
March 16	Straight to the Heart	Visioncapture Media, Creative Minds, Creative Saints	Dave Fabros (director); Carl Guevara, Gwen Zamora, Ricci Chan, Vincent de Jesus, Kiko Matos, Nico Antonio	Drama, Comedy	
March 26	Hele Sa Hiwagang Hapis	Star Cinema, Ten17P, Epicmedia, Sine Olivia Pilipinas	Lav Diaz (director); John Lloyd Cruz, Piolo Pascual, Susan Africa, Hazel Orencio, Alessandra de Rossi, Angel Aquino	Drama, Fantasy	

=== April–June ===
Color key

- – a Sinag Maynila Film Festival entry film

Opening	Title	Production outfit	Cast and crew	Genre	Source
April 6	Whistleblower	Unitel Productions, Quento Media	Adolfo Alix Jr. (director); Nora Aunor, Cherry Pie Picache, Angelica Panganiban	Drama	
April 6	Elemento	Viva Films, Thriverion Media Production	Mark Meily (director); Cristine Reyes, Jake Cuenca, Albert Silos, Elizabeth Oropesa, Cholo Barretto	Horror, drama	
April 13	Echorsis	Insight 360	Lemuel Lorca (director); John Lapus, Kean Cipriano, Alex Medina, Kiray Celis, Mich Liggayu, Chokoleit, Alessandra de Rossi	Horror, comedy	
April 22	Dyamper	Solar Entertainment Corporation, Centerstage Productions	Mes de Guzman (writer & director); Carlo Aquino, Alchris Galura, Tim Mabalot, Kristoffer King, Debbie Garcia, Liza Diño	Crime, drama	
April 22	Expressway	Solar Entertainment Corporation, Centerstage Productions	Ato Bautista (director); Shugo Praico (screenplay); Alvin Anson, Aljur Abrenica	Crime, thriller	
April 22	Lila	Solar Entertainment Corporation, Centerstage Productions	Gino Santos (director); Janine Gutierrez, Enchong Dee, Sherry Lara	Horror, drama	
April 22	Mrs.	Solar Entertainment Corporation, Centerstage Productions	Adolf Alix Jr. (director); Elizabeth Oropesa, Lotlot de Leon, Rosanna Roces, Anita Linda, Mark Herras	Biographical drama	
April 22	T.P.O.	Solar Entertainment Corporation, Centerstage Productions	Joselito Altarejos (writer & director); Oliver Aquino, Mara Lopez, Micko Laurente, Menggie Cobarrubias, Lui Manansala	Drama	
May 4	Just the 3 of Us	Star Cinema	Cathy Garcia-Molina (director); Jennylyn Mercado, John Lloyd Cruz	Romantic comedy	
May 4	This Time	Viva Films	Nuel Naval (director); James Reid, Nadine Lustre	Romance, drama	
May 4	Diyos-Diyosan	LEB Telon Film Production	Cesar Buendia (director); John Prats, Princess Punzalan, Tirso Cruz III, Kiko Estrada	Drama	
May 11	My Candidate	Quantum Films	Quark Henares (director); Derek Ramsay, Shaina Magdayao, Iza Calzado	Romantic comedy	
May 25	Love Me Tomorrow	Star Cinema	Gino M. Santos (director); Piolo Pascual, Dawn Zulueta, Coleen Garcia	Romantic comedy	
June 1	Teniente Gimo	Viva Films, KIB Productions, RMS Productions	Roland M. Sanchez (director); John Regala, Suzelle Ranillo, Julio Diaz, Eliza Pineda, Mon Confiado, Joshua Dionisio, Kate Brios	Horror, Romance	
June 1	Tatay Kong Sexy	Largavista Entertainment	Jose Javier Reyes (director); Jinggoy Estrada, Maja Salvador	Comedy, Drama	
June 8	Pare Mahal Mo Raw Ako	Viva Films, Scenema Concepts International	Jovan Tan (director); Edgar Allan Guzman, Michael Pangilinan, Nora Aunor, Joross Gamboa, Matt Evans, Ana Capri, Nikko Seagal, Miggy Campbell, Katrina Legaspi	Romance	
June 8	Magtanggol	Felix and Bert Film Productions	Sigfreid Barrios Sanchez (director); Joonee Gamboa, Dina Bonnevie, Ejay Falcon, Albie Casiño, Denise Laurel, Tom Rodriguez, Yam Concepcion	Drama	
June 22	The Story of Love	ABJ Productions	GM Aposaga (director); Ma. Isabel Lopez, Kylene Alcantara, Aj Ocampo, Princess Flores at Dianne Medina	Drama	
June 29	The Achy Breaky Hearts	Star Cinema	Antoinette Jadaone (director); Jodi Sta. Maria, Richard Yap, Ian Veneracion	Romantic-comedy, drama	

=== July–September ===
Color key

- – a ToFarm (The Outstanding Farmers in the Philippines) Film Festival entry film
- – a Cinemalaya Philippine Independent Film Festival entry film

Opening	Title	Production outfit	Cast and crew	Genre	Source
July 2	Curiosity, Adventure & Love	Tamed Rose Productions	Sunshine Lichauco de Leon, Suzanne Richiardone (directors); Jessie Lichauco	Documentary	
July 6	I Love You to Death	Regal Entertainment, The IdeaFirst Company	Miko Livelo (director); Kiray Celis, Enchong Dee	Horror, Romantic-comedy	
July 6	Ma' Rosa	Center Stage Productions	Brillante Mendoza (director); Jaclyn Jose, Julio Diaz, Baron Geisler	Drama, Action	
July 13	Imagine You and Me	APT Entertainment, GMA Films, M-Zet Productions	Mike Tuviera (director); Alden Richards, Maine Mendoza	Romance; Drama	
July 13	Dukot	Star Cinema, Ten17P	Paul Soriano (director); Enrique Gil, Shaina Magdayao, Ricky Davao, Bing Pimentel	Action, Suspense	
July 13	Free Range	ToFarm	Dennis Marasigan (director); Paolo O' Hara, Jackie Rice, Mads Nicolas	Drama	
July 13	Kakampi	ToFarm	Victor Acedillo, Jr. (director); Neil Ryan Sese, Felix Roco, Gloria Sevilla, Suzette Ranillo, Kate Brios	Fantasy, Drama	
July 13	Paglipay	ToFarm	Zig Dulay (director); Garry Cabalic, Anna Luna, Joan de la Cruz	Romance, Drama	
July 13	Pauwi Na	ToFarm	Paulo Villaluna (director); Bembol Roco, Cherry Pie Picache, Meryll Soriano, Chai Fonacier	Comedy, Drama	
July 13	Pilapil	ToFarm	Jose Johnny Nadela (director); James Blanco, David Remo, Pancho Magno, Diva Montelaba	Action. Thriller	
July 13	Pitong Kabang Palay	ToFarm	Maricel Cariaga (director); Arnold Reyes, Sue Prado, Micko Laurante	Family, Drama	
July 20	Anino sa Likod ng Buwan *(2016 commercial release)	Octobertrain Films, The IdeaFirst Company	Jun Lana (director); LJ Reyes, Luis Alandy, Anthony Falcon	Drama	
July 27	Ignacio de Loyola	Jesuit Communications Foundation	Paolo Dy (director); Andreas Muñoz	Biographical	
July 27	How to Be Yours	Star Cinema	Dan Villegas (director); Bea Alonzo, Gerald Anderson	Romantic, Drama	
August 6	Ang Bagong Pamilya Ni Ponching	Cinemalaya	Inna Salazar, Dos Ocampo (directors); Janus Del Prado, Ketchup Eusebio, Odette Khan, Lollie Mara, Jojo Alejar, Joyce Burton-Titular, Jackie Lou Blanco, Alibreza Libre, Phynne Barnett, Richard Manabat, Mimi Juareza, Sam Thurman, Ria Garcia, Joanna Bago, Manuel Velasco, Ricky Sanchez	Dark comedy, Family drama	
August 6	Dagsin	Cinemalaya	Atom Magadia (director); Tommy Abuel, Lotlot De Leon, Benjamin Alves, Janine Gutierrez, Alex Diaz, Sue Prado, Marita Zobel, Rolando Inocencio, Yoshihiko Hara, Arpee Bautista	Drama, Suspense	
August 6	Hiblang Abo	Cinemalaya	Ralston Jover (director); Lou Veloso, Jun Urbano, Leo Rialp, Nanding Josef, Matt Daclan, Lui Manansala, Flor Salanga, Cherry Malvar, Angela Cortez, Mike Liwag, Rommel Luna, Rener Concepcion, Anna Luna	Drama	
August 6	I America	Cinemalaya	Ivan Andrew Payawal (director); Bela Padilla, Rob Rownd, Matt Evans, Thou Reyes, Sheena Ramos, Joe Vargas, Raflesia Bravo, Julz Savard, Lui Manansala, Elizabeth Oropesa, Kate Bautista, Rhyzza Kafilas	Drama, Comedy	
August 6	Kusina	Cinemalaya	David Corpuz, Cenon Palomares (directors); Judy Ann Santos, Gloria Sevilla, Joem Bascon, Luis Alandy, Elora Españo, Mike Liwag, Bong Cabrera, Karen Gaerlan, Jane Biton, Isha Salic, Trina Legaspi, Lala Padilla, Czarina Yecla, Princess Ortiz	Drama	
August 6	Lando at Bugoy	Cinemalaya	Vic Acedillo, Jr. (director); Allen Dizon, Gold Azeron, Roger Gonzales, Rachel Anne Ang Rosello, Maricar Semitara, Carlos Penaloza, Benjie Criss Estrella, Reynald Mangao, Camilo Apugan	Drama	
August 6	Mercury Is Mine	Cinemalaya	Jason Paul Laxamana (director); Pokwang, Bret Jackson, Vincent de Jesus, Lee O'Brian, Maey Bautista, Bea Vega, Mitzi Ong, Leo Sarmiento, Justine Dizon, Waka Hasegawa, Uzziel Delamide, Kristof Garcia	Drama, Comedy	
August 6	Pamilya Ordinaryo	Cinemalaya	Eduardo Roy, Jr. (director); Ronwaldo Martin, Hasmine Killip, Maria Isabel Lopez, Sue Prado, Ruby Ruiz, Moira Lang, Karl Medina, Erlinda Villalobos, Domingo Cobarrubias, Paolo Rodriguez, John Bon Andrew Lentejas, John Vincent Servilla, Rian Magtaan, Myla Monido, Alora Sasam, Ruth Alferez	Drama	
August 6	Tuos	Cinemalaya	Derick Cabrido (director); Nora Aunor, Barbie Forteza, Flor Salanga, Ron Martin, Elora Españo, Ronnie Martinez, Al Bernard Garcia, Elora Españo, Casimira Cabilitasan	Drama	
August 10	That Thing Called Tanga Na	Regal Entertainment	Joel Lamangan (director); Eric Quizon, Angeline Quinto, Billy Crawford, Martin Escudero, Kean Cipriano,	Comedy	
August 24	Camp Sawi	Viva Films	Irene Villamor (director); Andi Eigenmann, Bela Padilla, Yassi Pressman, Arci Muñoz, Kim Molina, Sam Milby	Romantic-comedy	
September 14	Barcelona: A Love Untold	Star Cinema	Olivia Lamasan (director); Kathryn Bernardo, Daniel Padilla	Romantic, Drama	
September 21	Hermano Puli (Ang Hapis at Himagsik ni Apolinario Dela Cruz)	Teamwork Film Productions	Gil Portes (director); Aljur Abrenica, Alessandra de Rossi	Historical	
September 28	My Rebound Girl	Regal Entertainment	Emmanuel dela Cruz (director); Alex Gonzaga, Joseph Marco	Romantic	
September 28	The Woman Who Left	Cinema One Originals, Sine Olivia Pilipinas	Lav Diaz (director); Charo Santos-Concio, John Lloyd Cruz	Drama	

=== October–December ===
Color key

- – a QCinema International Film Festival entry film
- – a Cinema One Originals Film Festival entry film
- – a Metro Manila Film Festival entry film

Opening	Title	Production outfit	Cast and crew	Genre	Source
October 5	Siphayo	BG Productions International	Joel Lamangan (director); Nathalie Hart, Luis Alandy, Joem Bascon	Drama, thriller	
October 12	The Third Party	Star Cinema	Jason Paul Laxamana (director); Angel Locsin, Zanjoe Marudo, Sam Milby	Comedy, romance	
October 13	Ang Manananggal sa Unit 23B	QCinema	Prime Cruz (director); Ryza Cenon, Martin del Rosario, Cholo Barretto, Vangie Labalan	Dark romance	
October 13	Baboy Halas	QCinema	Bagane Fiola (director); Omeles Laglagan, Ailyn Laglagan, Vangelyn Panihao, Jhea Mae Laglagan	Drama	
October 13	Best. Partee. Ever.	QCinema	Howard Yambao (director); JC De Vera, Mercedes Cabral, Jordan Herrera, Kristoffer King, Aaron Rivera, Angela Cortez	Drama	
October 13	Hinulid	QCinema	Kristian Sendon Cordero (director); Nora Aunor, Jess Mendoza, Raffi Banzuela, Jesus Volante, Delia Enverga, Ken Balmes	Drama	
October 13	Patay na si Hesus	QCinema	Victor Villanueva (director); Jaclyn Jose, Chai Fonacier, Melde Montañez, Vincent Viado, Mailes Kanapi, Olive Nieto, Sheenly Gener	Black comedy	
October 13	Purgatoryo	QCinema	Roderick Cabrido (director); Bernardo Bernardo, Kristoffer King, Jess Mendoza, Arnold Reyes, Rollie, Innnocencio, Elora Españo	Drama	
October 13	Women of the Weeping River	QCinema	Sheron Dayoc (director); Laila Putli Ulao, Sharifa Pearlsia Ali-Dans, Taha Daranda, Dalma Baginda, Hasim Kasim, Mohammad Yusop Hajiraini	Drama	
October 19	Bakit Lahat ng Gwapo may Boyfriend?	Viva Films	Jun Robles Lana (director); Anne Curtis, Dennis Trillo, Paolo Ballesteros	Comedy, Romance	
November 2	The Escort	Regal Entertainment	Enzo Williams (director); Lovi Poe, Derek Ramsay, Christopher de Leon, Jean Garcia	Erotic thriller	
November 14	2 Cool 2 Be 4gotten	Cinema One Originals	Petersen Vargas (director); Khalil Ramos, Ethan Salvador, Jameson Blake	Teen drama	
November 14	Baka Bukas	Cinema One Originals	Samantha Lee (director); Jasmine Curtis-Smith, Louise delos Reyes	Romance	
November 14	Every Room is a Planet	Cinema One Originals	Malay Javier (director); Rap Fernandez, Valeen Montenegro, Antoinette Taus	Romance	
November 14	Forbidden Memory	Cinema One Originals	Teng Mangansakan (documentarist)	Documentary	
November 14	Lily	Cinema One Originals	Keith Deligero (director), Shaina Magdayao, Rocky Salumbides, Natileigh Sitoy	Suspense	
November 14	Malinak Ya Labi	Cinema One Originals	Jose Abdel Langit (director); Angeline Quinto, Allen Dizon, Richard Quan, Menggie Cobrarrubias, Luz Fernandez, Raquel Villavicencio	Drama	
November 14	People Power Bombshell: The Diary of Vietnam Rose	Cinema One Originals	John Torres (documentarist)	Documentary	
November 14	Piding	Cinema One Originals	Paolo Picones, Gym Lumbera (documentarists)	Documentary	
November 14	Si Magdalola at ang mga Gago	Cinema One Originals	Jules Katanyag (director), Peewee O'Hara, Rhen Escaño, Gio Gahol, Josh Bulot	Horror	
November 14	Tisay	Cinema One Originals	Borgy Torre (director); Nathalie Hart, JC de Vera, Joel Torre	Drama	
November 9	Area	BG Productions International	Louie Ignacio (director); Ai-Ai delas Alas, Allen Dizon, Sue Prado	Erotic, Drama	
November 9	Upline Downline	Alliance for Networkers of the Philippines Organization	George Vail Cabrisante (director); Matt Evans, Ritz Azul, Alex Castro	Drama	
November 16	The Unmarried Wife	Star Cinema	Maryo J. de los Reyes (director); Dingdong Dantes, Paulo Avelino, Angelica Panganiban	Drama	
November 23	Working Beks	Viva Films	Jose Javier Reyes (director); John Lapus, TJ Trinidad, Joey Paras, Edgar Allan Guzman, Prince Stefan, Marlon Rivera	Comedy	
November 30	The Super Parental Guardians	Star Cinema	Joyce Bernal (director); Vice Ganda, Coco Martin, Awra Briguela, Onyok Pineda	Action, Comedy	
November 30	Enteng Kabisote 10 and the Abangers	OctoArts Films, M-Zet Productions, APT Entertainment	Marlon N. Rivera, Tony Y. Reyes (directors); Vic Sotto, Epi Quizon, Oyo Sotto	Comedy, Fantasy	
December 14	Mano Po 7: Chinoy	Regal Entertainment	Ian Loreños (director); Richard Yap, Jean Garcia, Janella Salvador, Marlo Mortel, Enchong Dee, Jessy Mendiola, Jake Cuenca, Kean Cipriano, Jana Agoncillo	Family drama	
December 25	Ang Babae sa Septic Tank 2: ForeverIsNotEnough	Martinez Rivera Films, Quantum Films, Tuko Film Productions, Buchi Boy Films, MJM Production	Marlon Rivera (director); Eugene Domingo, Jericho Rosales, Kean Cipriano, Cai Cortez, Khalil Ramos, Joel Torre	Comedy	
December 25	Die Beautiful	The IdeaFirst Company, Octobertrain Films	Jun Lana (director); Paolo Ballesteros, Joel Torre, Gladys Reyes, Luis Alandy, Albie Casiño	Comedy	
December 25	Kabisera	Firestarters Productions, Silver Story Production	Arturo San Agustin, Real Florido (directors); Nora Aunor, Ricky Davao, JC De Vera, Jason Abalos, RJ Agustin, Victor Neri, Ronwaldo Martin	Drama	
December 25	Oro	Feliz Film Productions	Alvin Yapan (director); Irma Adlawan, Joem Bascon, Mercedes Cabral	Political thriller	
December 25	Saving Sally	Rocketsheep Studios	Avid Liongoren (director); Rhian Ramos, Enzo Marcos	Live-action/ animation, Romance, Sci-fi	
December 25	Seklusyon	Reality Entertainment	Erik Matti (director); Rhed Bustamante, Neil Ryan Sese, Ronnie Alonte, Lou Veloso, Phoebe Walker, Dominic Roque, Elora Españo, John Vic De Guzman, JR Versales	Horror	
December 25	Sunday Beauty Queen	Voyage Studios, Tuko Film Productions, Buchi Boy Films	Babyruth Villarama Gutierrez (director); Rudelyn Acosta, Cherrie Mae Bretana, Mylyn Jacobo, Hazel Perdido, Leo Selomenio	Documentary drama	
December 25	Vince and Kath and James	Star Cinema	Theodore Boborol (director); Julia Barretto, Joshua Garcia, Ronnie Alonte	Romantic comedy	

== Awards ==
=== Local ===
The following first list shows the Best Picture winners at the four major film awards: FAMAS Awards, Gawad Urian Awards, Luna Awards and Star Awards; and at the three major film festivals: Metro Manila Film Festival, Cinemalaya and Cinema One Originals. The second list shows films with the most awards won from the four major film awards and a breakdown of their total number of awards per award ceremony.

Award/Festival	Best Picture		Ref.
65th FAMAS Awards	Barcelona: A Love Untold		
40th Gawad Urian Awards	Women of the Weeping River		
35th Luna Awards	Die Beautiful		
33rd Star Awards for Movies	Die Beautiful	Pamilya Ordinaryo	
27th Young Critics Circle Citations	Women of the Weeping River		
19th Gawad PASADO	(tie) Ang Babaeng Humayo, Tuos, Hele Sa Hiwagang Hapis, Iadya Mo Kami, Ma'Rosa		
15th Gawad Tanglaw	Ang Babaeng Humayo, Hele Sa Hiwagang Hapis, Pamilya Ordinaryo		
1st Eddy's Awards	Ang Babaeng Humayo		
41st Metro Manila Film Festival	Sunday Beauty Queen		
12th Cinemalaya Independent Film Festival	Pamilya Ordinaryo		
12th Cinema One Originals Film Festival	2 Cool 2 Be 4gotten		
4th QCinema Film Festival	Women of the Weeping River		
2nd Sinag Maynila Film Festival	Mrs		
2nd CineFilipino Film Festival	Ned's Project		
1st ToFarm Film Festival	Paglipay		

Film	Total	FAMAS	Urian	Luna	Star
Die Beautiful	12	0	2	5	5
Barcelona: A Love Untold	6	4	0	0	2
Pamilya Ordinaryo	6	0	1	1	4
Women of the Weeping River	6	0	6	0	0
Everything About Her	4	1	0	0	3
Ignacio de Loyola	4	0	0	4	0
Ringgo: The Dog Shooter	3	3	0	0	0
Seklusyon	3	0	0	0	3

=== International ===
The following list shows Filipino films (released in 2016) which were nominated or won awards at international industry-based awards and FIAPF-accredited competitive film festivals.

Award	Category	Nominee	Result	Ref.
11th Asian Film Awards	Best Director	Lav Diaz, Ang Babaeng Humayo (The Woman Who Left)	Nominated	
11th Asian Film Awards	Best Actress	Charo Santos-Concio, Ang Babaeng Humayo (The Woman Who Left)	Nominated	
11th Asian Film Awards	Best Screenplay	Lav Diaz, Ang Babaeng Humayo (The Woman Who Left)	Nominated	
10th Asia Pacific Screen Awards	Best Performance by an Actress	Hasmine Killip, Pamilya Ordinaryo (Ordinary People)	Won	
73rd Venice International Film Festival	Golden Lion	Lav Diaz, Ang Babaeng Humayo (The Woman Who Left)	Won	
69th Cannes Film Festival	Best Actress	Jaclyn Jose, Ma' Rosa	Won	
66th Berlin International Film Festival	Silver Bear Alfred Bauer Prize	Lav Diaz, Hele sa Hiwagang Hapis (A Lullaby to the Sorrowful Mystery)	Won	
29th Tokyo International Film Festival	Best Actor	Paolo Ballesteros, Die Beautiful	Won	
29th Tokyo International Film Festival	Audience Award	Die Beautiful	Won	
