= 40th Gawad Urian Awards =

2017 Philippine film awards ceremony

- Official poster featuring Vilma Santos in Mike de Leon's Sister Stella L. (1984).
- Date: July 20, 2017
- Site: ABS-CBN Studio 10, South Triangle, Quezon City
- Hosted by: Billy Crawford; Butch Francisco; Jodi Sta. Maria

Highlights
- Best Film: Women of the Weeping River
- Most awards: Women of the Weeping River (6)
- Most nominations: Women of the Weeping River (12)

Television coverage
- Network: Cinema One

The 40th Gawad Urian Awards or Ika-40 na Gawad Urian was held on July 20, 2017 at Studio 10 of ABS-CBN. They honored the best Filipino films for the year 2016. It aired live at Cinema One channel.

Nominations were announced on June 27. Women of the Weeping River received the most nominations with twelve.

Women of the Weeping River won the most awards with six awards, including Best Film. The Natatanging Gawad Urian was awarded to Vilma Santos.

== Winners and nominees ==
| Best Film Pinakamahusay na Pelikula | Best Direction Pinakamahusay na Direksyon |
|---|---|
| Women of the Weeping River; Ang Babaeng Humayo; Baboy Halas; Ma' Rosa; Paglipay; Pamilya Ordinaryo | Sheron Dayoc – Women of the Weeping River; Lav Diaz – Ang Babaeng Humayo; Zig Dulay – Paglipay; Bagane Fiola – Baboy Halas; Avid Liongoren – Saving Sally; Lemuel Lorca – Ned's Project; Brillante Mendoza – Ma' Rosa; Eduardo Roy, Jr. – Pamilya Ordinaryo; Paolo Villaluna – Pauwi Na |
| Best Actor Pinakamahusay na Pangunahing Aktor | Best Actress Pinakamahusay na Pangunahing Aktres |
| Paolo Ballesteros – Die Beautiful; Tommy Abuel – Dagsin; Garry Cabalic – Paglipay; Ronwaldo Martin – Pamilya Ordinaryo; Khalil Ramos – 2 Cool 2 Be 4gotten; Bembol Roco – Pauwi Na; Pepe Smith – Singing in Graveyards | Hasmine Kilip – Pamilya Ordinaryo; Irma Adlawan – Oro; Nora Aunor – Hinulid; Angeli Bayani – Ned's Project; Ai-Ai delas Alas – Area; Jaclyn Jose – Ma' Rosa; Elizabeth Oropesa – Mrs.; Cherry Pie Picache – Pauwi Na; Charo Santos – Ang Babaeng Humayo; Laila Ulao – Women of the Weeping River |
| Best Supporting Actor Pinakamahusay na Pangalawang Aktor | Best Supporting Actress Pinakamahusay na Pangalawang Aktres |
| Christian Bables – Die Beautiful; Nonie Buencamino – Ang Babaeng Humayo; John Lloyd Cruz – Ang Babaeng Humayo; Taha Daranda – Women of the Weeping River; Julio Diaz – Ma' Rosa; Jess Mendoza – Hinulid | Sharifa Pearlsia Ali-Dans – Women of the Weeping River; Rhed Bustamante – Seklusyon; Joan Dela Cruz – Paglipay; Lotlot de Leon – Mrs.; Barbie Forteza – Tuos; Janine Gutierrez – Dagsin; Anna Luna – Paglipay; Lui Manansala – Ned's Project; Mariam Zimadar Caranay-Raper – Women of the Weeping River; Meryll Soriano – Pauwi Na |
| Best Screenplay Pinakamahusay na Dulang Pampelikula | Best Cinematography Pinakamahusay na Sinematograpiya |
| Sheron Dayoc – Women of the Weeping River; John Paul Bedia – Ned's Project; Lav Diaz – Ang Babaeng Humayo; Zig Dulay – Paglipay; Troy Espiritu – Ma' Rosa; Eduardo Roy, Jr. – Pamilya Ordinaryo; Paolo Villaluna & Ellen Ramos – Pauwi Na | Rommel Sales – Women of the Weeping River; Albert Banzon – Paglipay; Albert Banzon – Pamilya Ordinaryo; Mycko David – Tuos; Lav Diaz – Ang Babaeng Humayo; Odyssey Flores – Ma' Rosa; Raphael Meting & Mark Limbaga – Baboy Halas |
| Best Production Design Pinakamahusay na Disenyong Pamproduksyon | Best Editing Pinakamahusay na Editing |
| Erik Manalo, Rommel Laquian & Rocketsheep Studio – Saving Sally; Harley Alcasid – Pamilya Ordinaryo; Harley Alcasid – Women of the Weeping River; Ryan Cuatrona & Celine Belino – Hinulid; Angel Diesta – Die Beautiful; Joel Geolamen – Baboy Halas; Brillante Mendoza – Ma' Rosa; Aped Santos – Paglipay; John Paul Sapitula – Ned's Project | Carlo Francisco Manatad – Women of the Weeping River; Lav Diaz – Ang Babaeng Humayo; Zig Dulay – Paglipay; Diego Marx Dobles – Ma' Rosa; Carlo Francisco Manatad – Pamilya Ordinaryo; Ellen Ramos & Paolo Villaluna – Pauwi Na; Benjamin Tolentino – Die Beautiful |
| Best Music Pinakamahusay na Musika | Best Sound Pinakamahusay na Tunog |
| Jema Pamintuan – Tuos; Gian Gianan – Paglipay; Kit Mendoza – Women of the Weeping River; Pablo Pico – Saving Sally; Pike Ramirez, Paolo Villaluna & Veena Ramirez – Pauwi Na | Mark Laccay – Hinulid; Willie Apa, Jr. & Charlie Daclan – Baboy Halas; Corinne de San Jose, Mark Locsin & Che Villanueva – Ang Babaeng Humayo; Albert Michael Idioma – Ma' Rosa; Albert Michael Idioma & Immanuel Verona – Women of the Weeping River; Albert Michael Idioma & Immanuel Verona – Pamilya Ordinaryo; Andrew Milallos – Paglipay |
| Best Short Film Pinakamahusay na Maikling Pelikula | Best Documentary Pinakamahusay na Dokyumentaryo |
| Arvin Belarmino & Noel Escondo – Nakaw; Mon Garilao – Fish Out of Water; Raymund Ribay Gutierrez – Imago; Ryanne Murcia – Entre Medio Del Fin; Jarell Serencio – Mga Bitoon Sa Siyudad; Isabel Quesada – Pektus | Baby Ruth Gutierrez – Sunday Beauty Queen; Gutierrez Mangansakan II – Forbidden Memory; Racquel Zaballero-Sanchez & Glenn Ternal – Forever Bridgeless |

== Multiple nominations and awards ==
| Nominations | Film |
|---|---|
| 12 | Women of the Weeping River |
| 11 | Paglipay |
| 9 | Ang Babaeng Humayo |
| 9 | Ma' Rosa |
| 9 | Pamilya Ordinaryo |
| 7 | Pauwi Na |
| 5 | Baboy Halas |
| 5 | Ned's Project |
| 4 | Die Beautiful |
| 4 | Hinulid |
| 3 | Saving Sally |
| 3 | Tuos |
| 2 | Dagsin |
| 2 | Mrs. |

| Awards | Film |
|---|---|
| 6 | Women of the Weeping River |
| 2 | Die Beautiful |
