= Too Cool to Be Forgotten =

Too Cool to Be Forgotten may refer to:

- "2 Kool 2 Be 4-gotten", a 1998 song by Lucinda Williams from her album, Car Wheels on a Gravel Road
- Too Cool to Be Forgotten, a 2008 graphic novel written by Alex Robinson
- 2 Cool 2 Be 4gotten, a 2016 film directed by Petersen Vargas
