= Lichauco =

Lichauco is a surname. Notable people with the surname include:

- Alejandro A. "Ka Ding" Lichauco (1927–2015), Filipino economist, nationalist, and lawyer
- Jessie Lichauco (1912–2021), American centenarian, wife of Marcial
- Marcial Lichauco (1902–1971), Filipino lawyer and diplomat
