= List of naturalized Filipino citizens =

The following is a list of notable Filipinos who have acquired Philippine citizenship through naturalization. In contrast, natural-born Filipinos, are individuals who have one or both parents who were Philippine citizens at the time of the birth of that individual.

== List ==
The following is a list of people who acquired Filipino citizenship through naturalization.

Name	Born	Origin nation	Naturalized	Notes
Andray Blatche	1986	United States	2014 (Republic Act No. 10636)	American-born player who played for the Philippines men's national basketball team.
Justin Brownlee	1988	United States	2023 (Republic Act No. 11937)	American-born player who played for the Barangay Ginebra San Miguel of the Philippine Basketball Association.
Malick Diouf	1999	Senegal	2026 (Republic Act No. 12318)	Senegalese-born player who played for UP Fighting Maroons in the UAAP.
Marcus Douthit	1980	United States	2011 (Republic Act No. 10148)	American-born player who played for the Philippines men's national basketball team.
Chip Engelland	1961	United States	–	American-born coach who was a member of the Philippine national basketball team under the sponsorship of Northern Cement Corporation that captured the 1985 Jones Cup Championship.
Francis Burton Harrison	1873	United States	1936 (Commonwealth Act No. 79)	Former Governor-General of the Philippines and U.S. House of Representatives member.
Jessie Lichauco	1912	Cuba; United States	2013 (Republic Act No. 10356)	Cuban-born American philanthropist.
Aleksandr Korovin	1994	Russia	2024 (Republic Act No. 12115)	Russian-born pair figure-skater; partner of Isabella Gamez.
Angelo Kouame	1997	Côte d'Ivoire	2021 (Republic Act No. 11543)	Ivorian-born player who played for the Ateneo Blue Eagles basketball team and plays for the Philippines men's national basketball team.
Kulas (Kyle Jennermann)	1987/1988	Canada	2023 (Republic Act No. 11955)	Canadian-born vlogger who often covers Filipino travel and culture content.
Basel Manadil	1993	Syria	2019	Syrian vlogger who runs the YouTube channel The Hungry Syrian Wanderer which documents his experiences in the Philippines.
Bienvenido Marañón	1986	Spain	2021 (Republic Act No. 11570)	Spanish-born footballer.
Elizabeth Means	2002	United States	2026 (Republic Act No. 12319)	American-born player who played for Westminster (UT) Griffins in NCAA Division II.
Bruce McTavish	1939/1940	New Zealand	2018 (Republic Act No. 11161)	New Zealand-born boxing referee.
Ronnie Nathanielsz	1935	Sri Lanka	1973 (Presidential Decree No. 192)	Sri Lankan-born sports journalist, commentator and analyst.
Hans Smit	1958	Indonesia	2016 (Republic Act No. 10914)	Football coach who was born in Indonesia but grew up in the Philippines.
Akiko Thomson	1985	United States	1985 (Presidential Decree No. 1983)	American-born swimmer who grew up in the Philippines and took part in the Summer Olympics.
Peter Leslie Wallace	1939	Australia	2015 (Republic Act No. 10685)	Australian-born businessman.
George J. Willmann	1897	United States	1975 (Presidential Decree No. 740)	American Jesuit priest who had resided in the Philippines since 1936.

== See also ==
- Philippine nationality law
