= Peter Wallace =

Peter Wallace may refer to:

- Peter Wallace (rugby league) (born 1985), Australian rugby league footballer
- Peter Wallace (civil servant), Canadian public servant
- Peter Wallace (cricketer) (born 1946), New Zealand cricketer
- Peter Leslie Wallace (born 1939), Australian/Filipino businessman and newspaper columnist
- Peter Margetson Wallace (1780–1864), general officer in the British Army
- Peter Rudy Wallace (born 1954), American politician
- Peter Wallace (buccaneer), 17th century buccaneer in the Bay of Honduras
