= Alvin Aragon =

Filipino actor (born 1989)

- Born: Alvin Aragon; October 28, 1989 (age 36); Pasay, Philippines
- Occupations: Actor, model, social media personality
- Years active: 2003–present
- Spouse: Izzy Trazona (m. 2012)
- Children: 3
- Relatives: Sofia Trazona (stepdaughter)

Alvin Aragon (born October 28, 1989) is a Filipino actor and a social media personality. His controversial takes on homosexuality sparked online debates and were criticized by LGBTQ people, among them was TV host and talent manager Boy Abunda.

== Early life ==
Aragon was born on October 28, 1989 at the San Juan De Dios Hospital in Pasay. His mother died of ovarian cancer when he was five years old. He was then raised by his father until his father's death when Alvin was in the third grade. From the age of 10 to 14, he lived with his maternal grandmother. After entering show business at age 14, he stayed with relatives and friends because he did not have a permanent home.

== Career ==
Aragon first gained national attention as one of the contestants in GMA Network's talent search StarStruck (Season 1) whose winners were Mark Herras and Jennylyn Mercado. After his early exit in Starstruck, Aragon appeared in GMA7's series such as Ilumina (2010), and The Good Daughter (2012). He also appeared in the movie Kilig… Pintig… Yanig… (2004).

== Personal life ==
Aragon is married to former Sexbomb Girls member Izzy Trazona. They have three children, including one from Trazona's previous relationship.

== Controversy ==
In February 2026, Aragon drew public criticism for his anti-LGBTQ statements. He further received backlash after questioning celebrity parents who publicly support and accept their LGBTQIA+ children. During an interview, he cited several celebrities and argued that accepting a child's LGBTQIA+ identity was inconsistent with his interpretation of Christian teachings. Following Aragon's remarks about parents of LGBTQIA+ children, Tal Brosas, the daughter of actress-comedian K Brosas, criticized his comments on social media, questioning his authority to judge other parents.

Amid the negative feedback, Aragon received public support from Christian pastor Nixon Ng, who said that Aragon's views reflected the beliefs of many Christians. Ng also urged the public to respond with grace, adding that new Christians can sometimes be overly zealous in expressing their faith.

During the heat of the controversy, Aragon's stepdaughter Sofia Trazona recalled during a public interview that he had physically assaulted her when she was about 12 years old.

A few weeks later, Aragon revealed that he had experienced sexual abuse during childhood. He also said that he had previous sexual relationships with men before converting to Christianity.
