= So Connected =

- Theatrical release poster
- Directed by: Jason Paul Laxamana
- Screenplay by: Jason Paul Laxamana
- Produced by: Lily Y. Monteverde; Roselle Y. Monteverde
- Starring: Janella Salvador; Jameson Blake
- Cinematography: Rommel Sales
- Edited by: Chrisel Desuasido
- Music by: Paulo Protacio
- Production companies: Regal Films; LargaVista Entertainment
- Distributed by: Regal Entertainment
- Release date: 23 May 2018
- Country: Philippines
- Language: Filipino

So Connected is a 2018 Filipino film directed by Jason Paul Laxamana, starring Janella Salvador and Jameson Blake. It is produced by LargaVista Entertainment and Regal Films. It was released on May 23, 2018, by Regal Entertainment.

== Plot ==
Trisha (Janella Salvador) is a struggling waitress who buys a cellphone from a black market seller. Karter (Jameson Blake), a love-starved boy who uses a cloud-based media-storing app to spy on his stolen cellphone's buyer, Trisha, who by then had broken up with her boyfriend, soon becomes enamored by Trisha.

Karter proceeds to locate her through the various clues he gathers from the media she unknowingly shares to him. When their paths finally cross, Trisha feels she has so many things in common with Karter that she somehow believes they are connected as soulmates.

== Cast ==
=== Main ===
- Janella Salvador as Trisha Biscocho
- Jameson Blake as Karter Calma

=== Secondary ===
- Ruby Rodriguez as Lea
- Krystal Brimner as Kate Calma
- Paulo Angeles as Lorenzo
- Rolando Inocencio as Conrad
- Cherise Castro as Jasmine
- Chai Fonacier as Heidi
- Marnie Lapus as Marissa
- VJ Mendoza as Ben
- Paeng Sudayan as Dig
- Vance Larena as Simon
- Basti Santos

== Release ==
The film, had its red-carpet premiere at SM Megamall on Tuesday May 22, 2018, and opened in theaters nationwide the following day.

== Critical reception ==
The film had generally positive reviews. Nestor Cuartero of The Manila Bulletin highlighted the chemistry of Salvador and Blake and praised the timely message the film aims to impart to viewers, "It tells us how to use social media properly." Rappler's Oggs Cruz says: "Jason Paul Laxamana’s So Connected is different in the sense that its protagonists are laced with a slivers of darkness that is rare in commercial love stories."

Meanwhile, Salvador was particularly commended for portraying an off-beat role. The Manila Feed posted about Janella, “She perfectly captured the essence of the character—her desperation, her longing to escape and her playful personality.” Inquirer's Joseph R. Atilano also praised, "Janella Salvador has a rare and inherent quality about her that not a lot of her contemporaries coming from any age group possesses [...] Brilliant acting is what she is becoming known for and she does it very, very well – and consistently."
