= 2016 Cinemalaya =

Filipino film festival in 2016

12th Cinemalaya Independent Film Festival
- Official festival poster
- Opening film: 1-2-3 by Carlo Obispo
- Closing film: Ang Hapis at Himagsik ni Hermano Puli by Gil Portes
- Location: Metro Manila, Philippines
- Film titles: 19
- Festival date: August 5, 2016–August 14, 2016
- Website: Official Website

Cinemalaya chronology
- 2017 2015

The 12th Cinemalaya Independent Film Festival was held from August 5–14, 2016 in Metro Manila, Philippines. This marks the return of full-length films after their absence in last year's edition. A total of nine full-length features and ten short films competed. The festival was opened by Carlo Obispo's 1-2-3 and was closed by Gil Portes' Ang Hapis at Himagsik ni Hermano Puli. At the awards night, both Pamilya Ordinaryo and Tuos dominated, with each receiving five awards. Pamilya Ordinaryo won Best Film.

== Entries ==
The winning film is highlighted with boldface and a dagger.

=== Full-Length Features ===
Title	Director	Cast	Genre
Ang Bagong Pamilya ni Ponching	Inna Miren Salazar and Dos Ocampo	Janus del Prado, Ketchup Eusebio, Odette Khan, Lollie Mara and Jojo Alejar	Dramedy
Dagsin	Atom Magadia	Tommy Abuel, Lotlot de Leon, Benjamin Alves and Janine Gutierrez	Drama, Suspense
Hiblang Abo	Ralston Jover	Lou Veloso, Jun Urbano, Leo Rialp and Nanding Josef	Drama
I America	Ivan Andrew Payawal	Bela Padilla, Rob Rownd, Matt Evans, Thou Reyes and Sheena Ramos	Dramedy
Kusina	David Corpuz and Cenon Palomares	Judy Ann Santos, Gloria Sevilla, Joem Bascon and Luis Alandy	Drama
Lando at Bugoy	Vic Acedillo, Jr.	Allen Dizon, Gold Azeron, Roger Gonzales and Rachel Anne Rosello	Drama
Mercury Is Mine	Jason Paul Laxamana	Pokwang, Bret Jackson, Vincent de Jesus and Lee O'Brian	Dramedy
**Pamilya Ordinaryo** ^{†}	Eduardo Roy, Jr.	Ronwaldo Martin, Hasmine Killip and Maria Isabel Lopez	Drama
Tuos	Derick Cabrido	Nora Aunor and Barbie Forteza	Drama

=== Short films ===
Title	Director
Bugtaw	Noah del Rosario
Butas	Richard Cawed
Fish Out of Water	Ramon A.L. Garilao
Forever Natin	Cyrus Valdez
Get Certified	Isaias Herrera Zantua
Ang Hapon ni Nanding	Rommel Tolentino
Ang Maangas, Ang Marikit at Ang Makata	Jose Ibarra Guballa
Mansyong Papel	Ogos Aznar
Nakauwi Na	John Relano; Patrick Baleros; Luis Hidalgo
**Pektus** ^{†}	Isabel Quesada

== Awards ==
The awards ceremony was held on August 14, 2016 at the Tanghalang Nicanor Abelardo, Cultural Center of the Philippines.

=== Full-Length Features ===
- Best Film – Pamilya Ordinaryo by Eduardo Roy, Jr.
  - Special Jury Prize – Mercury is Mine by Jason Paul Laxamana
  - Audience Choice Award – Tuos by Derick Cabrido
- Best Direction – Eduardo Roy, Jr. for Pamilya Ordinaryo
- Best Actor – Tommy Abuel for Dagsin
- Best Actress – Hasmine Kilip for Pamilya Ordinaryo
- Best Supporting Actor – Lou Veloso, Jun Urbano, Leo Rialp and Nanding Josef for Hiblang Abo
- Best Supporting Actress –
  - Lollie Mara for Ang Bagong Pamilya ni Ponching
  - Elizabeth Oropesa for I America
- Best Screenplay – Jason Paul Laxamana for Mercury is Mine
- Best Cinematography – Mycko David Tuos
- Best Editing – Carlo Francisco Manatad for Pamilya Ordinaryo
- Best Sound – Monoxide Works for Tuos
- Best Original Music Score – Jema Pamintuan for Tuos
- Best Production Design – Steff Dereja for Tuos
- NETPAC Award – Pamilya Ordinaryo by Eduardo Roy, Jr.

=== Short films ===
- Best Short Film – Pektus by Isabel Quesada
  - Special Jury Prize – Fish Out of Water by Ramon A.L. Garilao
  - Audience Choice Award – Forever Natin by Cyrus Valdez
- Best Direction – Ramon A.L. Garilao for Fish Out of Water
- Best Screenplay – Isabel Quesada for Pektus
- NETPAC Award – Ang Maangas, Ang Marikit, at Ang Makata by Jose Ibarra Guballa
