= University of Perpetual Help System DALTA =

Private university in Las Piñas, Philippines

- Pamantasan ng Laging Saklolo Sistemang DALTA (Filipino)
- Former names: Perpetual Help College of Rizal (1975–1997); University of Perpetual Help Rizal (1997–2004); University of Perpetual Help DALTA System (2004–2005)
- Motto: Character Building is Nation Building
- Type: Private
- Established: February 5, 1975; 51 years ago
- Founder: Dr./BGen Antonio L. Tamayo
- Academic affiliations: Association of Southeast Asian Institutions of Higher Learning; Catholic Educational Association of the Philippines (CEAP); Philippine Association of Colleges and Universities (PACU); Philippine Accrediting Association of Schools, Colleges, and Universities
- President: Anthony Jose M. Tamayo
- Faculty: 1,500 (all campuses)
- Students: 18,500 (all campuses)
- Location: Alabang-Zapote Road, Pamplona 3, Las Piñas, Metro Manila, Philippines; 14°27′02″N 120°59′06″E (Las Piñas Main campus)
- Campus: Urban Main; Las Piñas Kilometer 17, Alabang-Zapote Road, Brgy. Pamplona III, Las Piñas City, NCR Satellite; Calamba Barangay Paciano Rizal, Calamba, Laguna; Molino Salawag-Zapote Road, Brgy. Molino III, City of Bacoor, Cavite
- Alma Mater song: Perpetual Help Hymn
- Colors: Maroon gold
- Nickname: Altas
- Sporting affiliations: NCAA (Philippines)
- Website: www.perpetualdalta.edu.ph
- Location in Metro Manila Location in Luzon Location in the Philippines

The University of Perpetual Help System DALTA (UPHSD) (Filipino: Pamantasan ng Laging Saklolo Sistemang DALTA; Perpetual or Perps) is a privately owned, non-sectarian co-educational institution of higher learning run by the DALTA Group of Companies with campuses at Las Piñas, NCR; Bacoor, Cavite; and Calamba, Laguna in the Philippines. The university offers programs in preschool, primary, secondary, tertiary and graduate levels, as well as short term vocational, technical, and special programs.

== History ==
University of Perpetual Help DALTA Medical Center in Las Piñas

The story of the University of Perpetual Help System DALTA started in 1968 when Jose de Guzman Tamayo and his wife, Josefina "Nena" Laperal Tamayo, both doctors, founded a school system which is now known as the University of Perpetual Help System JONELTA, which has five campuses. The first campus, the Perpetual Help College and Hospital, was established in Manila to meet the local and international demand for nurses. Two years later, the Perpetual Help College and Hospital in Malasiqui, Pangasinan, was founded in response to the "government's program to promote health and educational development in the rural areas". This was followed by the founding of the third Campus at Perpetual Help School of Laguna, in Biñan, Laguna in 1976, and its medical school, the Perpetual Help School of Laguna Foundation. Thereafter, the Perpetual Help Campus at General Mariano Alvarez in Cavite and the Perpetual Help Campus in Cauayan, Isabela were established, bringing the number of campuses to five.

Inspired by the noble cause of his parents, businessman and former Vice Mayor of Las Piñas Dr./BGen. Antonio "Tony" Laperal Tamayo (born October 24, 1945, Malasiqui, Pangasinan) alongside his wife, Dr. Daisy Moran Tamayo (born June 10, 1942, Manila), and a business associate, Dr. Ernesto Palanca Crisostomo, founded their own school, the Perpetual Help College of Rizal (PHCR) along Alabang-Zapote Road, in the municipality of Las Piñas, which was then a part of the province of Rizal. The school was housed in a four-story building constructed in just four months.

One year after opening of the PHCR, they established the Perpetual Help Medical Center (PHMC) about 200 meters from the school grounds.

The initial academic offering of PHCR is Bachelor of Science in nursing. Upon opening of the program, 700 students immediately enrolled. This humble beginning opened the way for the infant school to expand in terms of curricular programs, faculty, research, community service, infrastructure, and professional development. Such developments gave recognition to the college, and on April 20, 1997, the Commission on Higher Education granted PHCR university status, leading to its name being changed as University of Perpetual Help Rizal (UPHR), achieving the distinction of being the first and university in the recently chartered City of Las Piñas.

To reflect the distinction of leadership between the DALTA System (led by Dr./BGen. Tony, and Dr. Daisy Tamayo), and the JONELTA System (led by Jose, and Nena Tamayo), UPHR was rechristened as the University of Perpetual Help DALTA System (UPHDS) in 2004, making a slight reorganization a year later, leading to its official and business name of University of Perpetual Help System DALTA (UPHSD).

The term DALTA in the name of the university is the acronym for Daisy [and] Antonio Laperal TAmayo, the conjugal founders.

On February 5, 2026, in coincidence of the institution's 50th academic year (Academic Year 2025 - 2026), UPHSD celebrated its 50th founding anniversary, with the theme: Celebrating DALTA: Diversity, Altruism, Leadership, Technology, and Adaptability.

=== Administration of UPHSD ===
Complementing the leadership and management functions of Dr./BGen. Tony, and Dr. Daisy Tamayo are their two sons:

- Dr. Anthony Jose Moran Tamayo, CPA, MBA, Ed.M.
- LTC Richard Antonio Moran Tamayo, MBA-H, REB, GSC, PAF(Res)

==== Board of Directors ====
- Chairman of the Board, and chief executive officer (CEO): Dr./BGen Antonio Laperal Tamayo, FPCHA, AFP(Res)
- Vice Chairman, and Treasurer: Dr. Daisy Moran Tamayo, RN, MAN, Ph.D.
- President, UPHSD: Dr. Anthony Jose Moran Tamayo, CPA, MBA, Ed.M.
- Secretary, UPHSD; President UPHMC: LTC Richard Antonio Moran Tamayo, MBA-H, REB, GSC, PAF(Res)
- Board Members
  - Antonio Romulo G. Tamayo (Executive Vice President for Sports and Athletics, UPHSD)
  - Rachel Antonette G. Tamayo
  - Josefina Virginia G. Tamayo

== Campuses ==
=== Las Piñas campus ===

The Las Piñas Campus, which is the site of the former Perpetual Help College of Rizal, is the largest among the three campuses of UPHSD, and is the flagship campus of the entire University of Perpetual Help System. It has a student population of around 14,000 students and employs about 1,370 teaching and non-teaching staff. It offers more than 70 undergraduate and more than 10 postgraduate academic programs in addition to its Basic Education Department (Grade School, Junior Business High School, and Senior High School) offerings, which is among the largest in the Philippines.

The Las Piñas Campus houses multiple academic buildings and open spaces, namely:

- The Old Grade School Building (OGSB), which is actually the very first building of the entire campus, built in just four months; it houses the following offices and colleges:
  - the Office of the School Director,
  - the Graduate School,
  - DALTA Executive Academic, Audit, and Accreditation Center (DEAC),
  - the Office of Safety and Health (OSH),
  - the College of Arts and Sciences,
  - the headquarters of The Perpetualite (official student publication)
  - the Expanded Tertiary Education Equivalency and Accreditation Program (ETEEAP) Office
  - the Human Resources Department (HRD) offices
  - the Senior High School Office
  - the University Research and Development Center (URDC)
- Dr. Josefina Laperal Tamayo Building (Dr. JLTB), named after the mother of Dr./BGen Tamayo; formerly known as the New College Building (NCB), it houses the following offices and colleges:
  - the University Clinic
  - the Accounting Office
  - the Admissions Office
  - cashiers
  - the College of Radiologic Technology (RadTech) X-ray room
  - the College of Nursing (CON) simulation rooms
  - the College of Dentistry (COD) simulation rooms
  - the College of Arts and Sciences-Education (CAS-ED) Learning Center
  - the Alumni Affairs Office
  - the College of Maritime Education (CME) (and its bridge simulator)
  - the Senior High School Faculty Rooms
  - the Technical-Vocational Education and Training (TVET) Office
- Jose Moran Building (JMB), which houses the College of Engineering, Architecture, and Technology (CEAT); named after the father of co-founder Dr. Daisy Moran Tamayo
- Guadalupe Moran Building (GMB), which houses the College of International Tourism and Hospitality Management (CITHM), and the Science Laboratories (Biology, Chemistry, and Physics); named after the mother of co-founder Dr. Daisy Moran Tamayo
- The Administration Building, which houses the following offices and colleges:
  - the Office of the University Registrar (OUR)
  - the Admissions Office
  - the College of Dentistry
  - the College of Law (and its proprietary Library)
  - the College of Computer Sciences (CCS)
  - the College of Communication (including its studios)
  - ALTACOMM (the strategic communications arm of UPHS)
- The Criminology Building, which houses the following colleges:
  - the Gerardo G. Tamayo Memorial College of Criminology, and
  - the College of Business Administration, and Accountancy (CBAA)
- The Junior Business High School Building (JBHS), which houses the students enrolled in the Junior High School program. Facilities include a mini auditorium, a Home Economics Room, a Robotics Room, a basketball court, an open-air event hall, a canteen, the Basic Education Department Guidance Office, the CAT Headquarters and Armory, and the Office of the Basic Education Director
- The Grade School Building (GSB), which houses the students enrolled in the Grade School/Elementary program. Facilities include a mini-basketball court, a proprietary canteen, and ALTA's Green Field Zone, a play park floored with artificial turf.
- The Ernesto Palanca Crisostomo Hall, the primary multi-purpose use function hall of the university; named after the third co-founder of the university who is a good friend of the Tamayos; colloquially referred to as the "Auditorium", or simply "Audi" (pronounced /OH-dee/)
- The ALTAS Food Hub, containing in-house, and third-party concessionaire food stands
- The University Supply Center (Bookstore)
- The University Learning Resource Center (Library)
- The University Chapel, which also houses the Office for Religious Affairs
- The University Sports Complex, which is composed of the following facilities:
  - a naturally ventilated volleyball court (Gym 1)
  - the air-conditioned "Home of the ALTAS" basketball court (Gym 2)
  - Athletes' Quarters, and shower rooms
  - trophy cabinets
- a European Garden, inside the Dr. JLTB
- a Japanese Garden, beside the Ernesto Palanca Crisostomo Hall, and the ALTAS Food Hub
- Acacia Lane, the main road of the entire University complex; named as such because it is lined with acacia trees
- The University Lane, fondly referred by students and employees as U-Lane
- AUTOBACS Building, where aspiring automotive mechanics learn servicing programs, and learn Nihongo as part of a deployment program to Japan

The Las Piñas Campus can be accessed from two (2) entrances:

- the Alabang-Zapote Road entrance (accessed by pedestrians through the University Lane/U-Lane), and
- the F. Ocampo Avenue entrance (the de jure entrance of the campus; the main thoroughfare for all vehicles)

A third entrance, the Manila Times Village entrance (colloquially referred to as "Times"), was closed after complaints of noise from residents of the namesake of the entrance. A special access gate was later opened just at the end of the University Lane for students and employees who live in the said village.

=== Molino campus ===
The Molino campus was founded in May 1995 on a 6-hectare property along Barangay Molino III, Bacoor, Cavite, with an initial enrollment figure of 700. It caters to an estimated student population of 6,000.

=== Calamba campus ===
The Calamba campus was established in 1996 in Barangay Paciano Rizal, Calamba, Laguna, with an initial enrollment figure of 360 students. To date, UPHSD-CAL's enrollment has increased to 7,500 enrollees.

== Student Life (Las Piñas Campus) ==
Students and employees of the institution refer to themselves as Perpetualite(s) (Filipino: Perpetualista). It is with this united identity that all stakeholders are geared and focused to strive and achieve its primary principle of Character Building is Nation Building, and of being Helpers of God.

=== Student Personnel Services ===
Assistance for tertiary students at the university are the primary concern of the Student Personnel Services Office.

- Supreme Student Council (SSC)

The SSC, through its Officers from various colleges, and its Adviser, is geared towards student empowerment and self-reliance. It aims to help the student voice out their concerns and express themselves in the proper way. They enjoin students in civic and social affairs, harnessing pure Filipino culture. The officers of the SSC are elected on a yearly basis.

=== Arts and Culture Office ===
The ACO is the umbrella organization of all artistic activities in the field of performing arts for student-artists from various colleges of UPHSD.

- Perpetual Chorale

The Perpetual Chorale is the official chorale group of the UPHSD-LP. It is composed of student-artists from various colleges of the university. It aims to propagate, preserve and develop Philippine culture and arts through music. The Perpetual Chorale performs different genres of choral pieces such as Broadway, Classical, Foreign and Local Folk songs, Philippine Ethnic Songs, Contemporary Music, OPM and Sacred Music.

The Perpetual Chorale has been invited and performed in several events, and has made it to the stages of the Cultural Center of the Philippines for its open house festival: PASINAYA 2010 and PASINAYA 2011. The group has also been invited on many occasions to perform in the popular morning TV show Umagang Kay Ganda on ABS-CBN and also performed during the plenary session of the Senate of the Philippines in 2016 and 2017. This has been a venue for the group to showcase their talent in a televised setting.

- Sanlahi Pangkat Mananayaw (Folk Dance Troupe)

The Sanlahi Pangkat Mananayaw takes its name from two coined words, Isang Lahi (One Race). Composed of students from various colleges of the university.

- Dulaang Perpetual (Theater Arts Guild)

Dulaang Perpetual is the official resident student theater organization of UPHSD-LP. It is a collective of young Perpetualiate artists and performers who create stage plays from different theatrical genres, from contemporary to classical, and from experimental to guerilla performances (street performances) which shows the flexibility of the company and its student-actors.

- Perpetual Dance Company (PDC)

The PDC is the official street/hip-hop dance team & representative of UPHSD-LP. The team was formed on August 20, 2015, and was founded by Mr. Bobby John H. Salinas the Performing Arts Group Coordinator, and their current moderator, Coach Cristin Cruz Gapasin.

=== Student Publications (Las Piñas Campus) ===
- The Perpetualite - the official student publication of the Las Piñas Campus; content is primarily contributed by college students
- The Senior High School Perpetualite Gazette - the official student publication of the Senior High School Department
- The Junior Perpetualite - the official student publication of the Junior Business High School Department

=== Student Organizations ===
- 279th Naval Reserve Officer Training Corps (NROTC) Unit
- 136th Air Force Reserve Officer Training Corps (AF ROTC) Unit
- 1001st National Service Reserve Corps (NSRC)
- Red Cross Youth - Perpetual Chapter

== Athletics ==
UPHSD colors

UPHSD is a member of the National Collegiate Athletic Association (NCAA) since 1984, bearing the sports team moniker Perpetual Altas. As an active member of the NCAA, UPHSD seeks and trains young athletes to compete in all sports events of the league, representing the entire DALTA system, including the Molino, and Calamba campuses.

The moniker Altas comes from a Latin word that translates to English as “high,” symbolizing UPHSD's aspirations for further greatness. At the same time, it comes from the initials of the school founder, Dr./BGen Antonio L. Tamayo.

The senior varsity teams for men are named Perpetual Altas. The junior teams are the Junior Altas, while the women's teams are the Lady Altas.

=== Basketball ===
Since it has joined the league, the Altas basketball team had won two General Championships in two consecutive seasons from 1995–1996 to 1996–1997. They were able to reach the final four in the semifinals of Season 80, and Season 88 under coach Januario “Aric” del Rosario. The most recent time that UPHSD hosted the tournament was Season 94, in the 2018–2019 school year.

=== Cheerleading ===
The Altas Perpsquad nabbed the 1st Runner Up position in the National Cheerleading and Dance Championship National Capital Regional Qualifiers College Coed Division held from February 2 to 3, 2013 at the Music Hall of SM Mall of Asia in Pasay.

They also hold the most win in NCAA Cheerleading Competition with a total of 9 wins, 2 back-to-back wins and a three peat wins. They also won in the South East Asian Cheer Open in 2015 bagging a gold medal.

=== Pep band ===
Aside with the Altas Perpsquad, The Altas Perpscussionists serves as the school's main pep band and is highly involved during basketball and volleyball tournaments in the NCAA, and during cheerleading competitions. The band celebrated its 21st anniversary in 2019.

=== Beach volleyball ===
The Altas men's pair, Jay Dela Cruz and Sandy Montero, seized their first ever championship crown. The Junior Team, Jherald Martinez and Cristopher Soriano, placed second in their barefoot fight in the beach volleyball finals.

=== Volleyball ===
In Season 88, the ALTAS and Lady ALTAS grab its two-peat Back to Back Championship. The Lady Altas nabs its back-to-back championship and the ALTAS continued its reign of the Championship crown for three consecutive years (NCAA Volleyball Season 86th, 87th, and 88th).

== UPHSD-Bilibid Extension School ==
The University of Perpetual Help System DALTA-Bilibid Extension School at the New Bilibid Prison in Muntinlupa is one of the major corporate social responsibility programs of UPHSD and the Bureau of Corrections. The program was founded by Dr./BGen. Antonio Laperal Tamayo, chairman of the board and CEO, and former Bureau of Corrections director Vicente Eduardo in 1984. Throughout its run, it has produced more than 400 inmate-graduates, many of which have been released from prison and are now gainfully employed.

As of May 2025, it currently has 124 college students, and 98 Senior High School students, being taught by a total of 37 faculty members.

The Bilibid Extension School held its very first alumni homecoming on January 16, 2025, which was attended by 76 alumni, and faculty.

Currently, the UPHSD Extension school offers academic programs in Bachelor of Science in entrepreneurship, Bachelor of Science in Business Administration Major in Marketing Management, and Computer Hardware Servicing Course, as well as a full Senior High School Program (Grades 11 and 12) catering juvenile and coming-of-age detainees.

== University of Perpetual Help Mindoro Mission School ==
Another of UPHSD's corporate social responsibility programs is the University of Perpetual Help Mindoro Mission School, located in Sitio Lawaan, Lumangbayan, Abra de Ilog, Occidental Mindoro. It provides the Mangyan indigenous people in the area with free education, inclusive of their uniforms, school supplies, learning materials, clothing and other personal necessities.

It was envisioned by Dr./BGen Antonio Laperal Tamayo to help the Mangyan people gain an upper hand in the social ladder of life. Thus, instilling in them ideas of citizenship and promote further social and intellectual development.

The school has embarked into a Functional Literacy Program last June 9, 2012 and officially received its Certificate of Recognition last September 13, 2012 from the Department of Education (DepED) of Region IV – MIMAROPA Division of Occidental Mindoro, Mamburao, thereby becoming a part of the Alternative Learning System (ALS) and Projects.

As of October 2024, it now has five classrooms, and has an enrollment rate of 124 students for the School Year 2024 - 2025.

== Notable alumni ==
- Richard Gomez (Master in Business Administration) – athlete, television presenter, director and politician, currently representative of Leyte's 4th district
- Scottie Thompson (BS Business Administration, major in Marketing Management) – active professional basketball player of the PBA with Barangay Ginebra San Miguel
- Ely Buendia (Junior High School) – singer, songwriter, director, lead vocalist of Eraserheads
- Ted Failon (Junior High School) – politician and journalist
- Shaira Diaz (BS Business Administration, major in Marketing Management) – actress, television personality
- Joyce Pring (AB Communication, through ETEEAP) – television personality
- Arwen Ashley Sarmiento (Senior High School - Media Arts and Design Track) - actress; housemate, Pinoy Big Brother: Celebrity Collab Edition 2.0
- Basel Manadil (BS Computer Engineering) - aka. The Hungry Syrian Wanderer; Syrian-born naturalized Filipino content creator
- Sofia Trazona – drag performer and former P-pop singer

== See also ==
- University of Perpetual Help System DALTA - Molino Campus
- University of Perpetual Help System DALTA - Calamba Campus
- University of Perpetual Help System
