= Kulas (vlogger) =

Canadian-Filipino travel vlogger

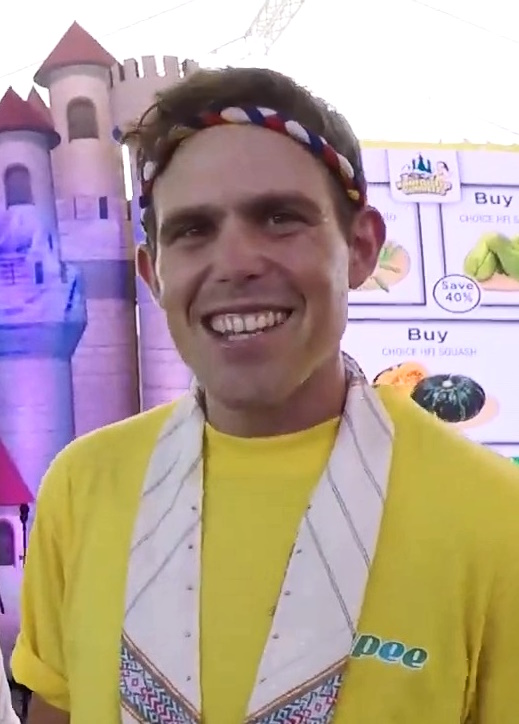
- Kulas in 2019
- Born: Kyle Douglas Jennerman; 1987/1988 (age 38–39); Vancouver Island, Canada
- Other name: Kulas
- Citizenship: Canadian / Filipino

YouTube information
- Channel: BecomingFilipino
- Years active: 2014–present
- Genre: Vlog
- Subscribers: 1.15 million
- Views: 318 million
- Last updated: November 25, 2025
- Website: www.becomingfilipino.com (archived)

Kyle Douglas Jennermann, better known as Kulas, is a Filipino and Canadian travel vlogger.

== Life prior to living in the Philippines ==
Before settling in the Philippines, Jennermann traveled to 29 countries in Europe and Southeast Asia. He last worked as an outdoor recreation educator in Hong Kong, where he became interested in the Philippines through stories shared with him by Filipino colleagues. Initially, Jennermann continued to work in Hong Kong while making repeated trips to the country, with his colleagues inviting him to stay and live with them during his visits. “I kind of got really immersed because I was living in a compound with families—like you have titas and titos, manangs, and manongs—these colleagues and families kind of took me in.”

The impetus for his decision to permanently move to the Philippines came in the wake of Typhoon Haiyan. Of his decision, he explained, “... one of our friends who I worked with was from Tacloban. So, it hit me really hard because I’m becoming quite inspired by the country that year.” He then spent a month in typhoon-hit Tacloban, an experience he described as “a really big eye-opener”, crediting his time spent there with inspiring him to start his vlog. By 2015, he had completely quit his job in Hong Kong, deciding to commit fully to his vlogging activities.

== BecomingFilipino ==
=== Social media platforms ===
BecomingFilipino, Kulas' vlog project, documents his travels across the Philippines, with the goal of introducing Filipino culture to a broader audience, educating foreign tourists, fighting misconceptions and stigmas around Filipino travel (especially to Mindanao), and promoting "better intentions that could benefit both Filipinos and foreigners". As of 2023, his YouTube channel and Instagram account have combined for a total of over 1.1 million subscribers and 229,000 followers. He has also previously maintained a standalone blog where his followers can suggest activities for him to experience.

=== Television ===
Kulas has featured in his own television show, Becoming Filipino Your Travel Blog which first airied on ABS-CBN News Channel in August 2016.

=== Life in the Philippines ===
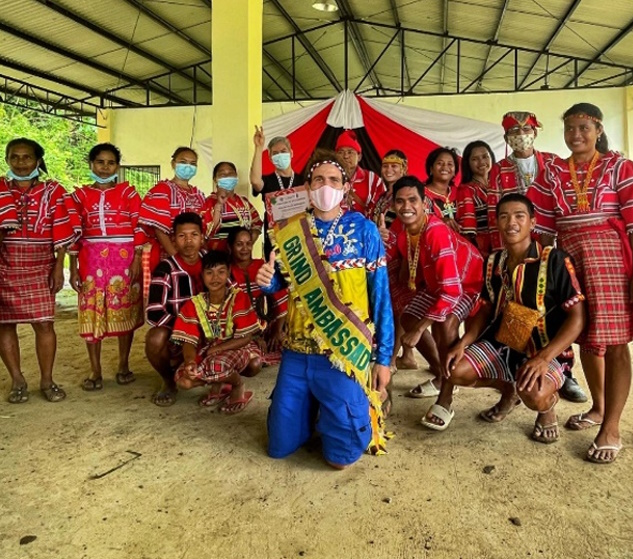
Kulas acting as an ambassador for a grassroots community-led innovation program by the Department of Science and Technology. May 2021

Settling in Cagayan de Oro, a hub for much of his activities, Kulas' channels document his experiences as a traveler to different parts of the Philippines as he immerses himself in the local cultures. By February 2023, he had visited 81 of the Philippines' 82 provinces, the lone exception being the province of Sulu.; by March 2024, he had accomplished this visit. One of his most viewed videos features the lantaka.

Kulas has helped in relief operations for the victims of various other typhoons that have impacted the Philippines, as he did for Haiyan back in 2013.

== Personal life ==
Jennerman is a native of Comox Valley in British Columbia, Canada. Having been born around 1987 or 1988 in Vancouver Island, he has Canadian citizenship.

While Kulas has stated that at the outset of his vlogging activities he had not originally aimed to become a Filipino citizen, he was later encouraged by a local congresswoman, Rep. Marlyn Alonte of Biñan, to consider the possibility. Alonte would later sponsor a naturalization bill in the Philippine House of Representatives, complementing an equivalent bill in the Senate filed by Senator Joel Villanueva that proposed to confer Filipino citizenship on him. He became a naturalized Filipino as a result of this process in 2023 with the passing of Republic Act No. 11955, which implemented a later consolidation of the two bills into law. Alonte would later administer his oath of allegiance at his swearing-in ceremony on September 13, 2023, formalizing his citizenship. Under Canadian and Philippine laws, Jennerman is permitted to hold dual citizenship of both countries.
