= Marcial Lichauco =

Filipino lawyer and diplomat

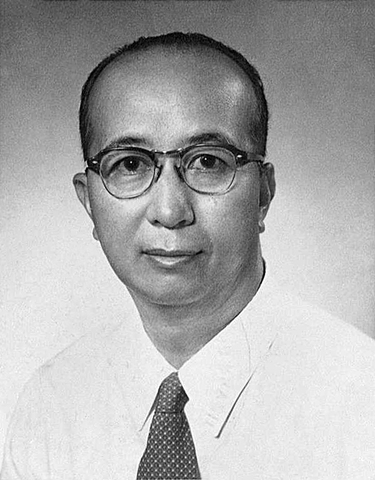

Ambassador Extraordinary and Plenipotentiary of the Republic of the Philippines to the United Kingdom
- In office 1963–1966
- President: Diosdado Macapagal; Ferdinand Marcos
- Preceded by: Melquiades J. Gamboa
- Succeeded by: Narciso G. Reyes

Personal details
- Born: Marical Primitivo Fernandez Lichauco; November 27, 1902 San Miguel, Manila, Philippine Islands, U.S.
- Died: March 4, 1971 (aged 68)
- Spouse: Jessie Coe (m. 1933)
- Children: 7
- Education: Harvard University

Marcial Primitivo Fernandez Lichauco (November 27, 1902 – March 4, 1971) was a Filipino lawyer and diplomat.

== Career ==
Lichauco was born to Faustino Lichauco (1870–1930), a member of Emilio Aguinaldo's Philippine Revolution, and Luisa Fernández y Arcinas (1873–1959). He studied at the American-established Central School in Manila, where he graduated as valedictorian. Lichauco then received his Bachelor of Arts from Harvard University in 1923 as the first Filipino graduate of Harvard College. He lived in Grays Hall during freshman year. He later studied at Harvard Law School and graduated in 1926.

Lichauco traveled throughout the United States delivering speeches to promote the idea of Philippine independence. He collaborated with Moorfield Storey to publish "The Conquest of the Philippines by the United States," which drew attention to the Philippine-American war.

In the 1930s, Lichauco was secretary to the OsRox Mission, which traveled to the United States Congress to urge passage of a bill granting independence to the Philippines. This ultimately became the Hare-Hawes-Cutting Act.

Lichauco spent World War II in occupied Manila. After the war, Lichauco published his memoir "Dear Mother Putnam" to document day-to-day life in Japanese-occupied Manila.

In 1963, President Diosdado Macapagal appointed Marcial Lichauco as Philippine Ambassador to the United Kingdom, Denmark, Norway and Sweden. Lichauco served in that post until 1966.
