= Petersen Vargas =

Filipino filmmaker

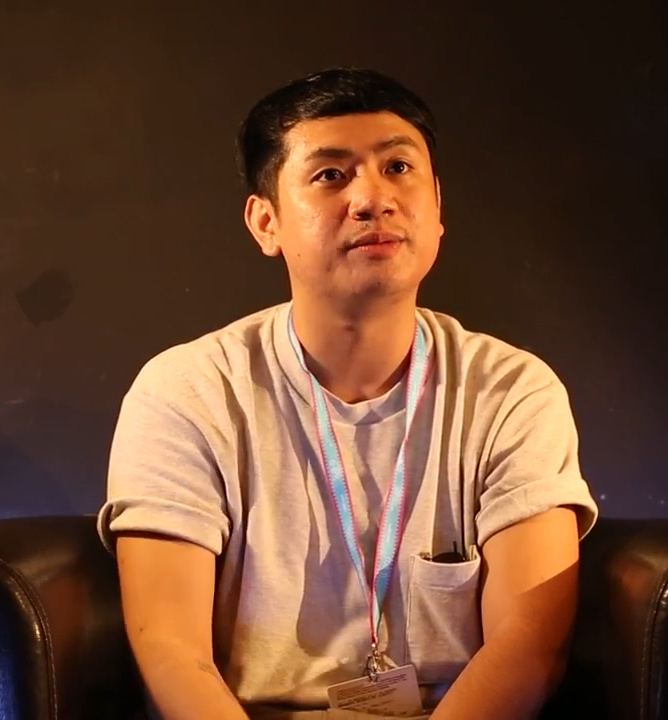
- Petersen Vargas in 2017
- Born: Hil Petersen Miranda Vargas; August 2, 1992 (age 34); Pampanga, Philippines
- Education: University of the Philippines
- Occupation: Film director
- Years active: 2015–present

Hil Petersen Miranda Vargas (born August 2, 1992) is a Filipino filmmaker. He is best known for directing the Cinema One Originals Best Picture winner 2 Cool 2 Be 4gotten (2016) and the web series Hello Stranger (2020).

== Early life and education ==
Hil Petersen Miranda Vargas was born on August 2, 1992 and raised in Pampanga, Philippines. Coming from a family of lawyers, he majored in political science at the University of the Philippines Diliman, but eventually switched to film after one year. During his time in university, Vargas' work in short films had attracted buzz among his peers and local indie movie enthusiasts. He graduated cum laude from the University of the Philippines Film Institute in 2014.

== Career ==
Vargas first received notice with his short film Lisyun qng Geografia, which won the Best Direction award at the 11th Cinemalaya Independent Film Festival in 2015. The following year, at the age of 24, Vargas directed his debut feature 2 Cool 2 Be 4gotten (2016), which was written by fellow Kampampagan filmmaker Jason Paul Laxamana. The film starred Khalil Ramos, Ethan Salvador, and was the film debut of Jameson Blake. The film premiered at the Cinema One Originals film festival, where it won Best Picture, Best Cinematography, and Best Supporting Actor (for Blake).

In January 2019 Vargas was selected to be a part of the Southeast Asia Fiction Film Lab (SEAFIC), a script and development lab for Southeast Asian filmmakers. He would go on to win the lab's grand prize, the SEAFIC Award. The prize will go towards the production of Vargas's second feature, a road movie tentatively titled Some Nights I Feel Like Walking, to be produced by Alemberg Ang and Jade Castro. The film was also selected to be a part of the Locarno Film Festival's Open Doors Hub. Later in the year, the Vargas-directed music video of Nadine Lustre's single St4y Up won Music Video of the Year at the Myx Music Awards 2019.

In 2020, Vargas directed the web series Hello Stranger, starring Tony Labrusca and JC Alcantara. In the same year, Some Nights I Feel Like Walking was selected to be a part of the 16th edition of the Cinéfondation's Atelier, a program under the auspices of the Cannes Film Festival which aims to encourage a new generation of filmmakers. Vargas also directed the short film How to Die Young in Manila (2020), which was spun off from his yet to be released second feature. The film had its world premiere at the 25th Busan International Film Festival and was later screened at the Singapore International Film Festival.

Aside from his work directing films, Vargas has also directed music videos, commercials, and has been a creative producer for the movie production company T-Rex Entertainment.

== Filmography ==
=== Feature films ===
Table featuring feature films directed by Petersen Vargas
Year	Title	Director	Writer	Producer	Ref.
2016	Sakaling Hindi Makarating	No	Yes	No	
2016	2 Cool 2 Be 4gotten	Yes	No	No	
2018	Billie and Emma	No	No	Yes	
2019	Open	No	No	Yes	
2021	Hello Stranger: The Movie	No	No	Yes	
2022	An Inconvenient Love	Yes	No	No	
2023	A Very Good Girl	Yes	No	No	
2024	Un/Happy For You	Yes	No	No	
2024	Some Nights I Feel Like Walking	Yes	Yes	No	

=== Short films ===
Table featuring short films directed by Petersen Vargas
Year	Title	Director	Writer	Producer	Ref.
2012	5 Ning Gatpanapun	Yes	Yes	Yes	
2013	Coup de Grace	Yes	Yes	Yes	
2013	Ito Ang Huling Araw	Yes	Yes	Yes	
2014	Lisyun qng Geografia	Yes	Yes	No	
2014	Swirl	Yes	Yes	Yes	
2016	Teka Lang, Uwi Na Tayo	Yes	Yes	Yes	
2020	How To Die Young in Manila	Yes	Yes	No	

=== Digital series ===
Table featuring digital series directed by Petersen Vargas
Year	Title	Director	Writer	Ref.
2017	Hanging Out	Yes	Yes	
2020	Hello Stranger	Yes	No	

=== Television series ===
Year	Title	Director	Writer	Ref.
TBA	Juan and Lily Run for SK	Yes	No	

=== Music videos ===
Year	Title	Artist	Ref.
2015	"Steady"	BP Valenzuela	
2017	"What Went Wrong"	Rusty Machines	
2017	"Autumn"	LONER	
2017	"The Life"	James Reid	
2018	"St4y Up"	Nadine Lustre	
