= The Woman Who Left =

2016 film by Lav Diaz

- Film poster
- Filipino: Ang Babaeng Humayo
- Directed by: Lav Diaz
- Screenplay by: Lav Diaz
- Based on: God Sees the Truth, But Waits by Leo Tolstoy
- Produced by: Lav Diaz
- Starring: Charo Santos-Concio
- Cinematography: Lav Diaz
- Edited by: Lav Diaz
- Production companies: Cinema One Originals; Sine Olivia Pilipinas
- Distributed by: ABS-CBN Film Productions
- Release dates: 9 September 2016 (Venice); 28 September 2016 (Philippines)
- Running time: 228 minutes
- Country: Philippines
- Language: Filipino

The Woman Who Left (Filipino: Ang Babaeng Humayo) is a 2016 Philippine drama film written, produced, directed, and edited by Lav Diaz. Starring Charo Santos-Concio in her first film since her return to acting after she stepped down as president and CEO of ABS-CBN Corporation, the story, inspired by Leo Tolstoy's 1872 short story God Sees the Truth, But Waits, follows a woman, who was released from imprisonment, decided to take revenge against the man who framed her.

Filmed entirely in black-and-white, it was selected to compete in the main competition section at the 73rd Venice International Film Festival where it won the Golden Lion. Although it has received a minimal release, the film has received acclaim from critics.

== Plot ==
Horacia Somorostro was released in 1997 after being imprisoned for a crime she did not commit. Although Somorostro reunites with her daughter, she learns that her husband is now deceased and her son is missing. She realized that a thing remains unchanged - the power and privilege of the elite. This belief was cemented when Somorostro later found out that her former rich lover, Rodrigo Trinidad, was the one who framed her for a crime. She learns that Trinidad is forced to stay within his house like his friends due to kidnapping incidents targeting the rich. To the ruling class, the kidnappings are the most serious problem in the country's history. Somorostro begins to plot her revenge amidst the crisis.

== Cast ==
- Charo Santos-Concio as Horacia Somorostro / Renata
- John Lloyd Cruz as Hollanda
- Nonie Buencamino as Magbabalot
- Shamaine Buencamino as Petra
- Michael de Mesa as Rodrigo Trinidad
- Kakai Bautista as Dading
- Marjorie Lorico as Minerva
- Mayen Estanero as Nena
- Lao Rodriguez as Father
- Jean Judith Javier as Mameng
- Mae Paner as Warden
- Jo-Ann Requiestas as Taba
- Daniel Palisa as Harry
- Romelyn Sale

== Production ==
The Woman Who Left was written and directed by Lav Diaz, who also served as producer, editor, and cinematographer. It was produced by Sine Olivia and Cinema One Originals, with the latter's head, Ronald Arguelles, being the film's executive producer. According to Diaz the film was made not for a film festival. The film was planned to have a duration of four hours, and by June 2016, the film was already in the editing process.

The film was primarily shot in Calapan, Oriental Mindoro, which is the hometown of lead actress Charo Santos-Concio. According to Diaz, the film was inspired by the 1872 short story "God Sees the Truth, But Waits" by Leo Tolstoy. Diaz, reflecting on the story and how it relates to his work, said that life is not truly understood by anyone and that more often people "abide and succumb to life's randomness." Charo Santos-Concio, the lead actress, described the film as "a story of forgiveness, of transcendence."

== Release ==
While the film was not made for a particular film festival, director Diaz is open to the idea of screening The Woman Who Left in film festivals. In June 2016, it was reported that talks were ongoing for the film to be screened locally in the Philippines and overseas. There were also talks for the film to be screened at the 2016 Metro Manila Film Festival.

The Woman Who Left was screened at the 73rd Venice International Film Festival held in September 2016 as the lone entry produced entirely by an Asian production film company. The 2016 Venice Film Festival marks the third time director Lav Diaz has entered a work at the film festival.

The Woman Who Left was also screened at the 2016 Cinema One Originals Film Festival. The film's local commercial theatrical release was initially set on 23 September 2016 to run for at least a week so it could be eligible to be submitted as a Philippine entry for the Best Foreign Language Film award at the 89th Academy Awards. The playdate of The Woman Who Left was moved to 28 September 2016 after Ma' Rosa was selected as the Philippine submission for the award instead.

== Reception ==
=== Critical response ===
On the review aggregator website Rotten Tomatoes, The Woman Who Left holds an approval rating of 80% based on 20 reviews, and an average rating of 7.3/10. On Metacritic, the film has a weighted average score of 83 out of 100, based on 13 critics, indicating "universal acclaim".

=== Accolades ===
Award	Date of ceremony	Category	Recipient(s) and nominee(s)	Result
Venice Film Festival|	10 September 2016	Golden Lion	Lav Diaz	Won
Asian Film Awards	21 March 2017	Best Director	Lav Diaz	Nominated
Asian Film Awards	21 March 2017	Best Actress	Charo Santos-Concio	Nominated
Asian Film Awards	21 March 2017	Best Screenwriter	Lav Diaz	Nominated
