= 2015 Cinemalaya =

2015 film festival edition

11th Cinemalaya Independent Film Festival
- Official festival poster
- Opening film: Taklub by Brillante Mendoza
- Closing film: Silong by Jeffrey Hidalgo & Roy Sevilla Ho
- Location: Metro Manila, Philippines
- Film titles: 10
- Festival date: August 7–15, 2015
- Website: Official Website

Cinemalaya chronology
- 2016 2014

The 11th Cinemalaya Independent Film Festival was held from August 7–15, 2015 in Metro Manila, Philippines. This is the first time that only short films would be presented. Feature films would be presented in next year's edition. Brillante Mendoza's Taklub opened the festival.

== Entries ==
The winning film is highlighted with boldface and a dagger.

=== Short films ===
Title	Director
Apasol	Ryan Joseph Murcia
Gatilyo ng Baril	Eero Yves Francisco; Glenmark Doromal
Kyel	Arvin Belarmino
Lisyun qng Geografia	Petersen Vargas
Mater	Annemikami Pablo
Nenok	Rommel Tolentino
Papetir	Darwin Novicio
**Pusong Bato** ^{†}	Martika Ramirez Escobar
Sanctissima	Kenneth Dagatan
Wawa	Angelie Mae Macalanda

== Awards ==
The awards ceremony was held on August 15, 2015 at the Tanghalang Aurelio Tolentino, Cultural Center of the Philippines.

=== Short films ===
- Best Short Film – Pusong Bato by Martika Ramirez Escobar
  - Special Jury Prize – Wawa by Angelie Mae Macalanda
  - Audience Choice Award – Sanctissima by Kenneth Dagatan
- Best Direction – Petersen Vargas for Lisyun qng Geografia
- Best Screenplay – Darwin Novicio for Papetir
- NETPAC Award – Wawa by Angelie Mae Macalanda
