= 2 Cool 2 Be 4gotten =

- Theatrical release poster
- Directed by: Petersen Vargas
- Written by: Jason Paul Laxamana; Petersen Vargas
- Produced by: Alemberg Ang
- Starring: Khalil Ramos; Ethan Salvador; Jameson Blake
- Cinematography: Carlos Mauricio
- Edited by: Mark Cyril Bautista
- Music by: Alyana Cabral; Christopher Flores
- Production companies: Cinema One Originals; VY/AC Productions
- Distributed by: Star Cinema
- Release dates: November 17, 2016 (Cinema One Originals); March 15, 2017 (Commercial release)
- Running time: 95 minutes
- Country: Philippines
- Languages: English; Filipino; Kapampangan

2 Cool 2 Be 4gotten is a 2016 Filipino coming-of-age drama film directed by Petersen Vargas in his feature-length directorial debut and written by Jason Paul Laxamana. The film stars Khalil Ramos, Ethan Salvador and Jameson Blake. It depicts the mysterious coming-of-age tale of Felix after he met half-American Snyder brothers, Magnus and Maxim.

The film premiered on November 17, 2016, at the 2016 Cinema One Originals Film Festival, where it won three awards, including Best Picture. It was commercially released by Star Cinema on March 15, 2017, in selected theaters nationwide.

== Synopsis ==
The film depicts the coming-of-age story of Felix (Khalil Ramos), a friendless and smart high school sophomore, who lives in post-lahar Pampanga in the late 1990s. His life takes a turn after the two new half-American students, the Snyder brothers, Magnus (Ethan Salvador) and Maxim (Jameson Blake), transfer to his school. He finds himself drawn toward them, especially Magnus, who becomes his classmate. Magnus befriends him and he infiltrates the private lives of the Snyder brothers. He interweaves himself to the dark and mysterious motives of the Snyder brothers and at the same time, his interactions with them uncover desires within him that he has never confronted before.

== Cast ==
=== Main ===
- Khalil Ramos as Felix Salonga
- Ethan Salvador as Magnus Snyder
- Jameson Blake as Maximilian "Maxim" Snyder

=== Supporting ===
- Ana Capri as Demetria
- Peewee O'Hara as Mrs. Salvacion
- Meann Espinosa as Ms. Echiverri
- Joel Saracho as Mr. Pangan
- Ruby Ruiz as Felix's mom
- Badjun Lacap as Felix's dad
- Jomari Angeles as Spencer
- Jerom Canlas as Leon
- Dylan Talon as Arwin

== Production ==
Director Petersen Vargas started his career in filmmaking by producing short films and shooting music videos. He became prominent after he won the Best Direction award for his short film, Lisyun qng Geografia, in the 2015 Cinemalaya Film Festival. In early 2016, Vargas approached fellow Kapampangan filmmaker Jason Paul Laxamana to collaborate for an entirely different story concept he had in mind. But instead, Laxamana offered him to direct a script he has written which was originally entitled Dos Mestizos. Laxamana's script focused on the effect of the arrival of the half-American Snyder brothers in their new school and Vargas made some revisions to this script to focus on their relationship with Felix. Later on, Vargas and the film's creative consultant, Jade Castro, decided to change its title from Dos Mestizos to 2 Cool 2 Be 4gotten to reflect the youthful spirit of the film. The title was inspired by Lucinda Williams' 1998 song, "2 Kool 2 Be 4-gotten".

They finished filming the film in just 8 days in order for it to be completed in time for the 2016 Cinema One Originals Film Festival.

== Release ==
The film originally received a R-13 rating during its screenings at the 2016 Cinema One Originals Film Festival. When it was submitted for a review for its nationwide commercial release, the Movie and Television Review and Classification Board (MTRCB) gave it a R-16 rating. The producers appealed the rating but instead, the MTRCB slammed the film with a R-18 rating as it said that “the film lacks any social redeeming value.” This caused an outrage from some netizens and filmmakers.

== Critical reception ==
Maridol Ranoa-Bismark of Philippine Entertainment Portal writes, "2 Cool has the potential to affect viewers with its versions of unconditional love." Philbert Dy of The Neighborhood gave it 4.5 out of 5 stars, commending the cinematography and the acting of the ensemble cast. Oggs Cruz of Rappler praised Laxamana's screenplay by describing it "as intelligent as it is emotionally potent." Cruz further described the film as "a work of gorgeous sentimentality."

Rito Asilo of the Philippine Daily Inquirer highlighted the performances of Ramos and Salvador by saying that the film "gets its main thespic tag-team boost from Salvador and Ramos’ complementary portrayals, each in thoughtful sync with the other." Status Magazine stated that it would "keep the audience on their toes with gripping scenes and a conflicted narrative." Prominent writer J. Neil Garcia described the film as "textured and outstanding". Furthermore, he praised the "deft and beautiful direction" of Vargas and the "comparably strong and noteworthy" performances of Ramos, Salvador and Blake. Movies for Millennials calls it "...sweet, humorous, romantic... An experience that's too cool to be forgotten. No pun intended."

== Awards and nominations ==
Year	Association	Award	Category	Nominee	Result	Source
2016	Cinema One Originals	12th Cinema One Originals Film Festival	Best Picture	2 Cool 2 Be 4gotten	Won	
2016	Cinema One Originals	12th Cinema One Originals Film Festival	Best Director	Petersen Vargas	Nominated	
2016	Cinema One Originals	12th Cinema One Originals Film Festival	Best Actor	Khalil Ramos	Nominated	
2016	Cinema One Originals	12th Cinema One Originals Film Festival	Best Supporting Actor	Jameson Blake	Won	
2016	Cinema One Originals	12th Cinema One Originals Film Festival	Best Supporting Actor	Ethan Salvador	Nominated	
2016	Cinema One Originals	12th Cinema One Originals Film Festival	Best Supporting Actress	Ana Capri	Nominated	
2016	Cinema One Originals	12th Cinema One Originals Film Festival	Best Screenplay	Jason Paul Laxamana	Nominated	
2016	Cinema One Originals	12th Cinema One Originals Film Festival	Best Cinematography	Carlos Mauricio	Won	
2016	Cinema One Originals	12th Cinema One Originals Film Festival	Best Editing	Mark Cyril Bautista	Nominated	
2016	Cinema One Originals	12th Cinema One Originals Film Festival	Best Music	Alyana Cabral; Christopher Flores	Nominated	
2016	Cinema One Originals	12th Cinema One Originals Film Festival	Best Sound	Monoxide Works	Nominated	
2017	Young Critics Circle	27th Young Critics Circle Awards	Best First Feature	2 Cool 2 Be 4gotten	Won	
2017	National Museum of Cinema	32nd Lovers Film Festival - Torino LGBTQI Visions	Audience Choice Award	2 Cool 2 Be 4gotten	Won	
2017	Manunuri ng Pelikulang Pilipino	40th Gawad Urian Awards	Best Actor	Khalil Ramos	Nominated	
2017	Philippine Movie Press Club	33rd Star Awards for Movies	New Movie Actor of the Year	Jameson Blake	Nominated	
