= Pamilya Ordinaryo =

- Directed by: Eduardo W. Roy Jr.
- Written by: Eduardo W. Roy Jr.
- Produced by: Ferdinand Lapuz: John Joseph Tan
- Starring: Ronwaldo Martin; Hasmine Killip; Maria Isabel Lopez
- Cinematography: Albert Banzon
- Edited by: Carlo Francisco Manatad
- Music by: Erwin Fajardo
- Production companies: Cinemalaya; Outpost Visual Frontier; Found Films
- Release date: 6 August 2016 (12th Cinemalaya Independent Film Festival)
- Running time: 107 minutes
- Country: Philippines
- Language: Tagalog

Pamilya Ordinaryo (lit. ' Ordinary Family') is a 2016 Philippine drama directed and written by Eduardo W. Roy Jr., and starring Ronwaldo Martin, Hasmine Kilip and Maria Isabel Lopez.

The film won the 12th Cinemalaya Independent Film Festival as a full-length feature film, and also was screened at local and international film awards.

== Synopsis ==
The movie is set in Manila, and revolves around two street children named Jane Ordinaryo (Hasmine Kilip) and Aries Ordinaryo (Ronwaldo Martin) who recently had a baby named Arjan, nearly one month old. They are married, but are homeless and live in poverty, so they resort to pickpocketing and use the stolen money and other items to care for their child.

Jane and Aries try to make the best of what they have, even stealing a foreigner's phone to take pictures of themselves and their baby, and printing the pictures that would later serve as the only records of Arjan.

One evening while Jane is at a wake, a transsexual named Ertha (Moira Lang) offers her a loan so she can buy some diapers. Jane refuses at first, saying that she knows she is unable to afford the payment, but the next day when Ertha offers to buy clothes for Jane, she agrees to go to the supermarket with her, taking Arjan with them.

While at the supermarket, Ertha offers to hold the baby, and says that she was going to withdraw some cash. However, a security camera shows her leaving with baby Arjan, never to be seen again. Jane immediately consults the security guard on duty however she is disregarded, and breaks down while another woman files a complaint for her in the local police station.

Jane and Aries, along with their friends search through avenues searching for witnesses, but to no avail. When Jane goes to the local police station, the officer assigned to her takes advantage and attempts to sexually harass her, leading her to break down more.

Later, the partners have an idea to make a public announcement at a radio station, hoping to receive more information. While the announcement did gather loads of attention, one message claimed to be the kidnapper's mother, and arranged a meetup with the partners. Claiming that she knew where Ertha was, she told Jane and Aries to collect ₱10,000 to order a fare for her, and so they obtained it through pickpocketing. Although they were not able to meet the goal, the woman accepted it anyway and left.

Their search attempts soon followed with a television interview from a local channel, hoping to document their life in poverty. Jane and Aries received hateful messages blaming them on the loss of their baby Arjan because of their carelessness, however receives a message at the end claiming that their baby was sold to a location far away. By this point, Aries was losing hope, and slowly accepted that they couldn't find Arjan, and even suggested that they should replace the baby, and to exacerbate their frantic situation, the television station had lost the only three pictures that the partners had of Arjan.

With the money they have left, they go to the specified address, which was in a well-secured neighbourhood. While Jane waits outside a security fence, Aries sneaks in the house and steals the baby, without the homeowner's notice. Though he managed to sneak the baby out, Jane later realised that the baby that Aries stole was the wrong one, and both of them frantically return it, in fear and guilt. They encounter a large crowd gathered around the homeowner's house, who was in distress. Feeling guilty, Jane and Aries place the stolen baby on the side of the road, and run off after being chased by police.

In the end of the film, Jane and Aries hitch a ride on a bus, presumably heading back to Manila, however the whereabouts of baby Arjan still remain unknown. With no record left of their baby and his kidnapper never identified, it's presumed that their search efforts have ultimately failed.

== Cast ==
=== Main cast ===
- Hasmine Kilip as Jane
- Ronwaldo Martin as Aries
- Moira Lang as Ertha (kidnapper)
- John Kenji Montoro as Baby Arjan

=== Supporting roles ===
- Maria Isabel Lopez as Cess
- Erlinda Villalobos as Helen
- Sue Prado as Alma
- Bon Andrew Lentejas as Edong
- Lao Rodriguez as Head Guard (supermarket)
- Karl Medina as Male Announcer (radio station)
- Alora Sasam as Female Announcer (radio station)

== Release ==
Pamilya Ordinaryo was first screened at the 12th Cinemalaya Independent Film Festival where it was selected as the winner for a full-length feature film on 6 August 2016. It was released to the Philippines on 31 August 2016.

On 12 June 2020, the film was added to the streaming service Netflix.

== Reception ==
The film generally received positive reviews.

Oggs Cruz from Rappler states in his film review that "Eduardo Roy Jr's third film feels like an exhausting, meandering piece of poverty propaganda, but it is undeniable that the film resonates on an emotional level.

The Film Development Council of the Philippines described the protagonists in an article: "Jane and Aries are just one of the many who have been lost, disenfranchised and ignored by the available structures and resources", calling it a "grim, undeniable reality". They also state that the film reveals some aspects of blatant corruption from the police, systemic incompetence and misfortune hindering the support of the most powerless in Philippine society.

Actors Hasmine Kilip and Ronwaldo Martin would go on to win many awards for their performance in this film, and would win several film festivals such as in Hanoi and Harlem. The film was also nominated in local film awarding ceremonies.
