= Women of the Weeping River =

- Directed by: Sheron Dayoc
- Written by: Sheron Dayoc
- Produced by: Fernando Ortigas; E. A. Rocha; Sheron Dayoc; Vincent Nebrida
- Starring: Laila Ulao; Sharifa Pearlsia Ali-Dans; Taha G. Daranda Tan; Miriam Zimadar-Raper
- Cinematography: Rommel Sales
- Edited by: Carlo Francisco Manatad
- Music by: Kit Mendoza
- Production companies: Southern Lantern Studios; TBA Productions
- Release date: October 15, 2016 (QCinema International Film Festival)
- Running time: 146 minutes
- Country: Philippines
- Language: Tausug

Women of the Weeping River is a 2016 drama film directed by Sheron Dayoc. It is set in Jolo, Sulu, with an ensemble cast of non-actors from the Western Mindanao region.

== Plot ==
Two women in a remote Muslim community confront an escalating blood feud and reach deep into themselves in hopes to undo the feud stretching back generations.

== Production ==
The film was shot over two weeks in July 2016, in Zamboanga City, and Jolo. The film was shot in 4K resolution with Sony A7S-II, and Panasonic Varicam LT cameras, with Leica Summicron-C lenses. The production is one of the first films using the Varicam LT. It was later presented in cinemas at 2.35 aspect ratio.

== Awards and honors ==
=== QCinema International Film Festival 2016 ===
The film won:

- Best Picture
- Best Actress (Laila Ulao)
- Best Supporting Actor (Taha Daranda)

=== 40th Gawad Urian Awards ===
It led with 12 nominations at the 40th Gawad Urian Awards, held at ABS-CBN Studio 10 on July 20, 2017. It won six awards including:

- Best Picture
- Best Director (Sheron Dayoc)
- Best Screenplay (Sheron Dayoc)
- Best Supporting Actress (Sharifa Pearlsia Ali-Dans)
- Best Cinematography (Rommel Sales)
- Best Editing (Carlo Francisco Manatad)

== Critical reception ==
Critics have praised the film for its portrayal of conflicts in Mindanao.

== See also ==
- Musmos na Sumibol sa Gubat ng Digma
