= Sofia Trazona =

Filipino drag performer and content creator (born 2002)

- Born: January 16, 2002 (age 24)
- Education: University of Perpetual Help System DALTA
- Occupations: Drag performer; dancer; content creator
- Years active: 2021–present
- Musical career
- Instrument: Vocals
- Formerly of: Beyond Zero

Sofia Trazona (born January 16, 2002) is a Filipino drag performer, dancer, content creator, and former singer. In 2021, she debuted in the P-pop idol group Beyond Zero, consisting of fellow content creators. In July 2023, she joined her first drag competition Bunganga Battle Royale, hosted by Viñas DeLuxe. In that year, she began performing in various nightclubs such as Nectar.

== Early life and education ==
Sofia Trazona was born on January 16, 2002. Her mother, Izzy Trazona-Aragon, is a former member of the Filipino girl group SexBomb Girls, while her biological father is Michael Navarro, founder of Filipino dance group Philippine Island Assassins. In a vlog interview with Ogie Diaz, she recalled that when she was around 12 years old, her stepfather Alvin Aragon allegedly hit her after she came home late during the holidays. She later clarified that Aragon choked her, but she withheld the full details to "protect" her mother. Trazona has two younger sisters and grew up with her grandmother. She studied at the University of Perpetual Help System DALTA in Bacoor, Philippines, pursuing a degree in accountancy. However, she did not graduate due to difficulties caused by the COVID-19 pandemic.

== Career ==
Trazona was a content creator with reportedly more than 100,000 followers on Instagram and accumulated more than 44.8 million likes on TikTok as of January 2021. On November 2, she was introduced as a member of the P-pop boy group Beyond Zero under the production company House of Mentorque. The group consisted of content creators with pre-existing fan bases on social media.

In July 2023, Trazona joined her first drag competition Bunganga Battle Royale, which was hosted by Viñas DeLuxe. She introduced her drag persona under the name Sofia, giving her the moniker "SexBomb Royalty".

As of September 2023, Trazona performed as a drag queen at various nightclubs, including Nectar Nightclub. She has named Plastique Tiara as her inspiration for her drag performances. As of February 2026, Trazona has been a regular performer at the Rampa (transl. Catwalk) Drag Club in Quezon City, Philippines.

On February 24, 2026, she was interviewed by Boy Abunda on his talk show Fast Talk with Boy Abunda.

On May 2, she made her runway debut for the Stiletto Walk at SM City Marikina, a fashion event to promote The Devil Wears Prada 2 in the Philippines.

== Personal life ==
Trazona is a trans woman. She came out in January 2025. She has been estranged from her mother Izzy by February 2026. Her biological father Michael Navarro however is supportive of her gender identity and her career as a drag artist.

== Filmography ==
=== Television ===
Year	Title	Role	Ref.
2026	Fast Talk with Boy Abunda	Herself	
