= Curiosity, Adventure & Love =

- Directed by: Sunshine Lichauco de Leon; Suzanne Richiardone
- Written by: Justin Weinrich; Sunshine Lichauco de Leon
- Produced by: Sunshine Lichauco de Leon; Suzanne Richiardone
- Starring: Jessie Lichauco
- Cinematography: Arturo Prins
- Edited by: Justin Weinrich
- Music by: Baptise Charvet
- Production company: Tamed Rose Productions
- Release date: July 2, 2016
- Running time: 62 minutes
- Country: Philippines
- Language: English

Curiosity, Adventure & Love is a 2016 Philippine documentary film produced and directed by Sunshine Lichauco de Leon and Suzanne Richiardone which centers around a 105-year-old Jessie Lichauco Cuban-born American who migrated to the Philippines in the 1930s as well as the migrant's insights on Philippine history.

== Synopsis ==
Curiosity, Adventure & Love weaves together 3 threads — the life of a 104-year-old American who journeys to the Philippines alone in the 1930s at age 18, the history of the country that she has witnessed and the insights and wisdom of a woman whose indomitable spirit has evoked inspiration for the thousands who have known her.

Sitting alone in her 250-year old Spanish colonial home, Jessie Lichauco’s poetic soul draws comfort from the ebb and flow of the river outside her window and protection from an ancient banyan tree while sharing stories with others of a life guided by fate, and where her innate sense of adventure, curiosity and compassion for others knows no boundaries.

Jessie's husband Marcial Lichauco, whom she met while he was working for the Philippine colonial government lobbying for independence in Washington DC, was among the country's most prominent lawyers of that era and this allowed her a front row seat to witness the rebirth of a nation. In time, Jessie's conviction to help her fellow man in every way possible led her to be granted Philippine citizenship for her profound contributions to the Filipino people. Bridging the past, the present and future, it's an amazing journey of a century of humankind, of love and finding home, of the cruelty of war and deprivations of a hostile occupation, and the rebuilding of a nation while living a life that restores our faith in the power of our own humanity.

== Cast ==
- Jessie Lichauco as herself

== Production ==
The film was directed and produced by Sunshine Lichauco de Leon and Suzanne Richiardone. Curiosity, adventure, and love is what has driven Jessie Lichauco on her life, according to Lichauco de Leon who is also Lichauco matriarch's granddaughter saying that this is the reason why the title of the film. Lichauco de Leon further explains that her film's goal is to emphasize the importance of personal life experience among the present generation at a time where technology and computers has become a significant part of people's lives.

The film which took 8 years to produce. The cinematography was done by Arturo Prins who also incorporated old prints and historical footage to the film.

Curiosity, Adventure & Love was originally planned to be published as biographical book but Lichauco de Leon was advised to make the project into a film instead since she was told that it would be more compelling if Jessie Lichauco herself could "speak and tell her own story" through a film format.

== Release ==
Curiosity, Adventure & Love had a gala premiere night on July 2, 2016, at the World Premieres Philippines Film Festival.

Following positive reception from the film's viewers and press, the production team is currently submitting it to festivals worldwide and working on theatrical and TV distribution. The film will eventually also be available through DVD and online.

== Reception ==
Rito Asilo for Inquirer.net wrote positively about the film describing the recollection of the protagonist as lucid ad precise. He notes that the film "neither proselytizes nor indulges in schmaltz" as it recalls the struggles of the Filipino as a people and took note of Jessie Lichauco's energy and Joie de vivre in doing narration for the film.

At the 2016 World Premieres Philippines Film Festival, Curiosity, Adventure & Love received the Special Jury Prize and in 2017, won Best Documentary at the SOHO International Film Festival, Best Documentary Feature at the NYLA (New York Los Angeles) International Film Festival, Best Documentary Feature at the Los Angeles Independent Film Festival (LAIFFA), and an Excellence Award for the categories of Human Spirit and Biography and Exceptional Merit for sub-categories of Viewer Impact: Motivational/inspirational and Editing in the Docs Without Borders Film Festival (DWBFF).

List of accolades
| Award / Film Festival | Category | Recipient(s) | Result |
|---|---|---|---|
World Premieres Philippines Film Festival 2016
| World Premieres Philippines Film Festival 2016 | Special Jury Prize | Curiosity, Adventure & Love | Won |
| World Premieres Philippines Film Festival 2016 | Best Picture | Curiosity, Adventure & Love | Nominated |
| Soho International Film Festival, New York | Best Documentary | Curiosity, Adventure & Love | Won |
| Docs Without Borders (Online) Festival | Excellence Award for the categories of Human Spirit & Biography | Curiosity, Adventure & Love | Won |
| Docs Without Borders (Online) Festival | Exceptional Merit Awards for the sub-categories of Viewer Impact: Motivational/Inspirational & for Editing | Curiosity, Adventure & Love | Won |
| NYLA (New York Los Angeles) International Film Festival | Best Documentary Feature | Curiosity, Adventure & Love | Won |
| Los Angeles Independent Film Festival Awards | Best Documentary Feature | Curiosity, Adventure & Love | Won |
