= The Hungry Syrian Wanderer =

Syrian vlogger (born 1993)

- Born: Basel Manadil; 11 November 1993 (age 32); Homs, Syria
- Citizenship: Syrian / Filipino
- Education: University of Perpetual Help (B.S.)
- Occupations: Blogger; YouTuber
- Years active: 2016–present
- Children: 2

YouTube information
- Channel: The Hungry Syrian Wanderer
- Years active: 2016–present
- Genre: Vlog
- Subscribers: 5.2 million
- Views: 493.9 million
- Last updated: 28 March 2026

Basel Manadil (Arabic: باسل مناديل; born 11 November 1993), also known as The Hungry Syrian Wanderer, is a Syrian-born Filipino vlogger and content creator, noted for his positive views on the Philippines and work to provide aid to victims of natural disasters. He is of pure Syrian descent and he obtained his Filipino citizenship via naturalization in 2019.

== Early life ==
Manadil was born to a Syrian father and mother. During the outbreak of the Syrian Civil War, his family were forced to evacuate individually on their own, as harassment from the Mukhabarat became worse whenever they learn that he was from Homs. His parents moved to Lebanon along with his sister and their dog, while he fled to the Philippines alone. He studied Computer Engineering at the University of Perpetual Help in Las Piñas, where he graduated.

== YouTube career ==
On 21 December 2016, he started his own YouTube channel where he drew attention in July 2019 for a video he released that praised the Philippines and its economy. Due to his popularity and his positive views on the country, Manadil has been dubbed the "adopted son of the Philippines".

He is known for his videos on his efforts to provide relief for victims of natural disasters, such as donating 1000 blankets to victims of the 2019 Cotabato earthquakes or cooking kabsa and other foods for people affected by the 2020 Taal Volcano eruption. Manadil owns a diner in Las Piñas, named the "YOLO Retro Diner". On 12 March 2021, he reported in a YouTube video that one YOLO Retro Diner location was robbed.

In mid-2021, Manadil first made public through his vlog about the fact that he acquired Filipino citizenship in 2019. He reasoned to his audience that he wanted to "cherish the moment" in regards to why he only announced the information two years later.
