= Peter Leslie Wallace =

Australian businessman

Peter Wallace
- Peter Wallace (2014)
- Born: Peter Leslie Wallace; June 3, 1939 (age 85)
- Citizenship: Australia (birthright), Philippines (naturalized, 2015)
- Occupation(s): Businessman, columnist

Peter Leslie Wallace is an Australian-born Filipino businessman and business columnist who started his professional career as an electrical engineer. He built a factory manufacturing maintenance products in the Philippines in 1975 for an American multi-national company. Subsequently, he accepted the position of Chairman of a conglomerate, Columbian Philippines, Inc., and later was CEO of Getz Corporation, the largest trading company at the time.

In 1982, he founded his own company, the Wallace Business Forum. He became a Filipino citizen in 2015. He is a regular opinion columnist for the Philippine Daily Inquirer since 2012.

In 2019, Wallace was appointed by President Rodrigo Duterte as member of the Ease of Doing Business and Anti-Red Tape Council of the Department of Trade and Industry (DTI).

== See also ==
- List of naturalized Filipino citizens
