= Ned's Project =

- Theatrical film poster
- Directed by: Lemuel Lorca
- Written by: John Bedia
- Produced by: Toni Co; Ice Millado
- Starring: Angeli Bayani; Max Eigenmann; Biboy Ramirez; Ana Abad-Santos
- Cinematography: Tey Clamor
- Edited by: Lawrence Fajardo
- Music by: Jonathan Ong
- Release date: March 16, 2016 (CineFilipino Film Festival)
- Running time: 90 minutes
- Country: Philippines
- Languages: English; Filipino

Ned's Project is 2016 Filipino independent LGBT comedy-drama film directed by Lemuel Lorca with written and screenplay by John Bedia. The film stars Angeli Bayani, Max Eigenmann, Biboy Ramirez and Ana Abad-Santos. In the film, Bayani plays the role of Ned, a lesbian who has harbored a desire to have a baby. It is an official entry to the 2nd CineFilipino Film Festival.

The film has won Best Production Design, Best Actress, Best Screenplay, Best Picture, Best Supporting Actress and Best Cinematography at the 2016 Cinefilipino film festival. It has also been nominated for Best Sound, Best Scoring, Best Editing and another Best Supporting Actress.

== Rating ==
The film got an X rating from the Movie and Television Classification Ratings Board on first review. This was later upgraded to Parental Guidance (PG) on the second submission. The film itself was rated R-18 by the MTRCB.

== Critical reception ==
"My Movie World'" blogger gave a rating of 3.5 out of 5 stating that, "Ned's Project is a powerful and original romance that finally portrays the homosexual romance as two humans falling in love and never plays it for cliches, stereotypes, or comedy." Oggs Cruz from Rappler praised Bayani and Eigenmann's performance in the film stating that, "Bayani is impressive. She bathes the typical gestures that are expected of her character with tenderness. Maxene Eigenmann, who plays the woman who cures Ned of her heart's pain, injects her character with enough charm and appeal to make her role in Ned's life both believable and relatable." Arnel Ramos from Glitter.ph gave a positive review saying that "Ned's Project was a cinematic journey that needed to be experienced over and again." While LCN (Latest Celebrity News Philippines) criticized Bayani on her role stating that, "Sorry to say but Angeli Bayani failed to convince us that she's a lesbian in this film"
