= Jameson Blake =

Filipino-American actor, dancer, model, and television personality

- Born: Jameson Andrew Blake (Note: Jameson Blake was born in Hongkong. Thus, he does not possess his mother's maiden name which is Gibbs.); June 17, 1997 (age 29); British Hong Kong
- Occupations: Actor; dancer; model
- Years active: 2015–present
- Agent(s): Star Magic (2015–present); Regal Entertainment (2017–present)
- Known for: Hashtags
- Height: 5 ft 9 in (1.75 m)

Jameson Andrew Blake (born June 17, 1997) is a Filipino-American actor, dancer, and model based in the Philippines. He is best known for his roles in the films 2 Cool 2 Be 4gotten (2016), So Connected (2018), and Ang Babaeng Allergic sa WiFi (2018).

== Early life ==
Jameson Andrew Blake was born in British Hong Kong on June 17, 1997, to Filipina mother Clarissa Gibbs and American father Robin Blake. He has an older brother and a younger sister. Blake's parents separated, with his father remaining in Hong Kong, while he and his siblings moved to the Philippines with their mother.

== Career ==
Blake began appearing in television commercials for brands such as Monde Nissin Bingo Cookie Sandwich, Coca-Cola, and Jollibee.

In 2015, he auditioned for Pinoy Big Brother: 737 as a teen housemate. He joined the second leg of the season, the Regular Edition, under the moniker "Ang Responsible Son ng Pampanga." Blake entered the house on Day 81 and was evicted on Day 112. Later that year, Blake joined the all-male dance group Hashtags on the noontime variety show, It's Showtime.

In 2016, Blake made his cinematic debut in the coming-of-age film 2 Cool 2 Be 4gotten. For his portrayal of Maxim, he won Best Supporting Actor at the 12th Cinema One Originals Film Festival and received a nomination for New Movie Actor of the Year at the 33rd PMPC Star Awards for Movies.

In 2017, Blake was part of the 13th Cinemalaya Independent Film Festival entry Nabubulok, where he portrayed Paul Harper. He shared in an interview that the role was somewhat less daring compared to his previous ones. That same year, he starred in Kip Oebanda's horror film Nay, which was an official entry to the 13th Cinema One Originals Film Festival. Blake also appeared in the 43rd Metro Manila Film Festival entry Haunted Forest as RJ.

Blake has also had roles Mama's Girl (2018), and So Connected (2018), as well as one of the 20 celebrity contestants (lucky stars) in Kapamilya Deal or No Deal (2026).

== Filmography ==
=== Film ===
Key
†	Denotes films that have not yet been released

Jameson Blake's film credits with year of release, film titles and roles
Year	Title	Role	Notes	Ref.
2016	2 Cool 2 Be 4gotten	Maximilian "Maxim" Snyder	Cinema One Originals Digital Film Festival entry	
2017	Nabubulok	Paul Harper	13th Cinemalaya Independent Film Festival entry	
2017	Nay	Francis	Cinema One Originals Digital Film Festival entry	
2017	Unexpectedly Yours	Kurt		
2017	Haunted Forest	RJ	43rd Metro Manila Film Festival entry	
2018	Mama's Girl	Zak Montañez		
2018	So Connected	Karter Calma		
2018	Ang Babaeng Allergic sa WiFi	Aristotle "Aris" Miller		
2019	Hello, Love, Goodbye	Edward Del Rosario		
2019	G!	Dom	3rd Pista ng Pelikulang Pilipino entry	
2019	The Mall, The Merrier	Tanacio Molina	45th Metro Manila Film Festival entry	
2020	My Lockdown Romance	Tom Amorado		
2020	Four Sisters Before the Wedding	Jeremy Yulo		
2021	Huwag Kang Lalabas	Jeric	Segment: "Hotel"; 47th Metro Manila Film Festival entry	
2024	Hello, Love, Again	Edward Del Rosario		
2024	Guilty Pleasure	Matthew		
2025	Co-Love	Clyde	CinePanalo Film Festival entry	
2025	Flower Girl	Dick	New York Asian Film Festival entry	
2025	Kontrabida Academy	Arnaldo		

=== Television ===
Key
†	Denotes shows that have not yet been aired

Jameson Blake's television credits with year of release, title(s) and role
Year	Title	Role	Notes	Ref.
2015	Pinoy Big Brother: 737	Himself / Housemate		
2015–2021; 2023–present	It's Showtime	Himself		
2016	Maalaala Mo Kaya: Boxing Ring	Xavier	1st MMK appearance	
2017	Wansapanataym: My Hair Lady	Ruben	1st Wansapanataym guesting	
2017	My Dear Heart	Dominic Divinagracia	1st Primetime TV series on ABS-CBN	
2017	A Love to Last	Andres Bonifacio "Fort" Gonzales	2nd Primetime TV series on ABS-CBN	
2018	Ipaglaban Mo: Hazing	Alvin	1st Ipaglaban Mo! guesting	
2018	Maalaala Mo Kaya: Ukelele	Boom	2nd MMK Appearance	
2018	Home Sweetie Home	Luke	Special Guest	
2018–2019	Ngayon at Kailanman	Oliver "Oli" Cortes	3rd Primetime TV series on ABS-CBN	
2019	Maalaala Mo Kaya: Dance Floor	RJ Cunanan	3rd MMK Appearance	
2020	24/7	Young Claudio		
2020	Loving Emily	Vince	First miniseries of iWantTFC	
2020	Bawal Na Game Show	Himself / Player		
2020–present	ASAP XP	Himself / Performer		
2021	Maalaala Mo Kaya: Planner	Gerard Santos	4th MMK Appearance	
2021	My Sunset Girl	Lucas	Second miniseries of iWantTFC	
2021–2022	Viral Scandal	Axel Matteo	4th Primetime TV series on ABS-CBN	
2022	A Family Affair	Drew Estrella	5th Primetime TV Series on ABS-CBN	
2022	Maalaala Mo Kaya: Engagement Ring	Nick	5th MMK Appearance	
2023	The Chosen One	Himself / Host		
2023	Jack and Jill sa Diamond Hills	Asyong	First Teleserye of TV5	
2024	Padyak Princess	Wesley		
2025	How to Spot a Red Flag	JR	6th Primetime TV Series on ABS-CBN	
2025	Incognito	Franco	7th Primetime TV Series on ABS-CBN	
2025	Rainbow Rumble	Himself / Contestant		
2025–2026	What Lies Beneath	Anton Montenegro	8th Primetime TV Series on ABS-CBN	
2026	Love Is Never Gone	Ace Verona		
2026	Kapamilya Deal or No Deal	Briefcase Number 8	Selected as contestant on the episode aired May 16, 2026; won ₱1.	

== Awards and nominations ==
Award	Year	Category	Nominated work	Result	Ref.
Box Office Entertainment Awards	2019	Most Promising Male Star for Television	Ngayon at Kailanman	Won	
Box Office Entertainment Awards	2017	Most Popular Recording/Performing Group	Hashtags	Won	
Cinema One Originals Film Festival	2016	Best Supporting Actor	2 Cool 2 Be 4gotten	Won	
Cinema One Originals Film Festival	2017	Best Supporting Actor	Nay	Nominated	
CinePanalo Film Festival 2025	2025	Best Actor	Co-Love	Nominated	
Pista ng Pelikulang Pilipino	2019	Best Supporting Actor	G!	Nominated	
PMPC Star Awards for Music	2016	Dance Album of the Year	Hashtags	Won	
PMPC Star Awards for Movies	2017	New Movie Actor of the Year	2 Cool 2 Be 4gotten	Nominated	
PMPC Star Awards for Movies	2019	Glowing Guy of the Night	—N/a	Won	
PMPC Star Awards for Television	2019	Best Drama Supporting Actor	Ngayon at Kailanman	Nominated	
