= Hasmine Kilip =

Filipino actress

Hasmine Killip (born Hasmine Bulaong Formalejo) is a Filipino actress. Killip starred in the film "Ordinary People," a performance that garnered her critical acclaim and multiple awards, including "Best Actress" at the 2016 Asia Pacific Screen Awards.

Killip has also won the Best Actress award at the Cinemalaya Festival, where "Pamilya Ordinaryo" was declared the best film. Additionally, she received a special citation for her acting from the London East Asia Film Festival and won the Best Actress award at the Hanoi International Film Festival.

Killip is married to her British husband, Anthony Killip.

== Filmography ==
=== Movies ===
Year	Title	Role	Notes
2015	Junilyn Has	Junilyn	
2016	Pamilya Ordinaryo	Jane	Won Best Actress
2021	Holy Emy	Teresa	
