= Jessie Lichauco =

Cuban-born Filipino philanthropist (1912–2021)

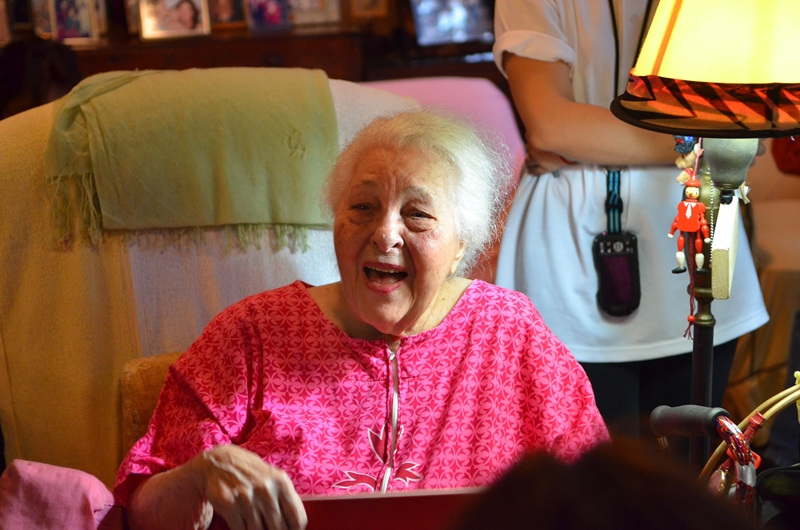
- Lichauco in 2014
- Born: Jessie Coe; January 10, 1912; Isla de los Pinos, Cuba
- Died: November 1, 2021 (aged 109)
- Citizenship: American, Filipino
- Spouse: Marcial Lichauco (m. 1933; died 1971)
- Children: 7

Jessie Lichauco (née Coe; January 10, 1912 – November 1, 2021) was a Cuban–Filipino philanthropist and activist.

== Early life ==
Jessie Coe was born in Isla de los Pinos, Cuba on January 10, 1912. Her father settled in Cuba after the Spanish–American War where he met Jessie's mother. She was later sent to St. Augustine, Florida, where she was raised in a convent school after she lost her parents as a young girl.

While working in Washington D.C., Coe met Marcial P. Lichauco, a Filipino lawyer who was working as a secretary for the OsRox Mission, which was seeking Philippine independence from the United States. She came to the Philippines upon Lichauco's invitation in the 1930s at the age of 18, marrying him on December 29, 1933, at the University of Santo Tomas Chapel. She and her husband were the first couple to be wed in the newly constructed chapel. After their marriage, Lichuaco lived almost continually in the Philippines.

== Social work ==
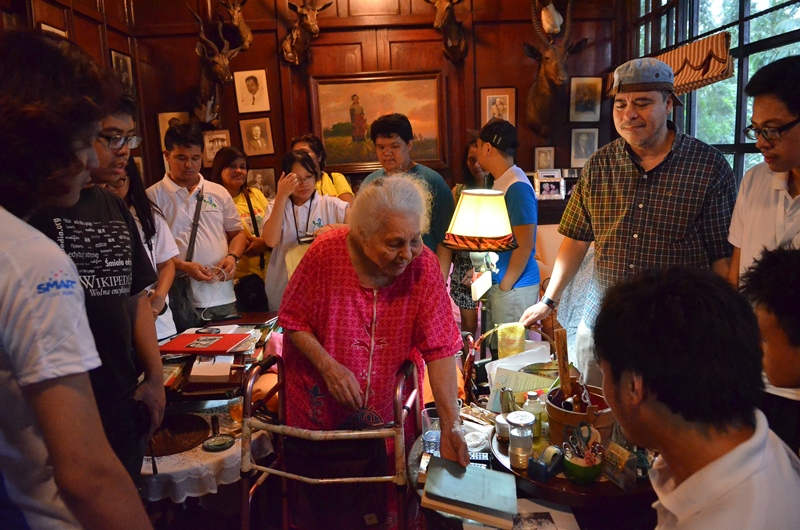
Jessie Lichauco entertaining participants of the 2014 WikiExpedition Santa Ana.

Lichauco joined the Asociación de Damas de Filipinas and devoted time to Settlement House, which was run by the Asociación. Together with her husband, she opened their temporary shelter in Santa Ana to war refugees, transforming it into a makeshift hospital during World War II. The facility served at least 2,000 people. After the war, she continued her devotion towards Settlement House and became its president for nine years.

Lichauco was one of the founders of the Red Feather Agency, later known as Community Chest, which raises funds for member charities. She also supported about 100 youth in completing their education in her own capacity.

From 1963 to 1966, her husband served as Philippine Ambassador to the United Kingdom, Denmark, Norway, and Sweden, appointed by then-President Diosdado Macapagal. Jessie Lichuaco served as the Ambassador's hostess, representing the Philippines in international organizations and events. The Ambassador's residence in Palace Green was open to Filipino businesspeople, students, workers, and tourists.

After her husband's death in 1971, Lichuaco spent a few years in the United States. She opened her house in Massachusetts to Filipino scholars and students needing a place to stay.

== Later life and death ==
In 2010, the family house in Santa Ana, Manila, was declared a Heritage House by the National Historical Commission of the Philippines.

Lichauco was granted Philippine citizenship in 2013 through Republic Act No. 10356 which was signed into law by President Benigno Aquino III. She was cited in the law for her social contributions to the country, adopting the Philippines as her home, speaking the Filipino language, and embracing Filipino culture.

She died on November 1, 2021, at the age of 109.

== In popular media ==
Lichauco was the subject of the documentary film Curiosity, Adventure, & Love, in which she portrayed herself. The film includes her migration to the Philippines, the meeting with her husband, Philippine history from her perspective, and her insights on the Filipino people during World War II. Curiosity, Adventure & Love has received several awards:

- Special Jury Prize, 2016 World Premieres Philippines Film Festival
- Best Documentary, 2017 SOHO International Film Festival
- Best Documentary Feature, 2017 NYLA (New York Los Angeles) International Film Festival
- Best Documentary Feature, 2017 Los Angeles Independent Film Festival
- Excellence Award for the categories of Human Spirit and Biography, Exceptional Merit for sub-categories of Viewer Impact: Motivational/inspirational and Editing, 2017 Docs Without Borders Film Festival.
