= Ma' Rosa =

2016 drama film by Brillante Mendoza

- Film poster
- Directed by: Brillante Mendoza
- Written by: Troy Espiritu
- Produced by: Larry Castillo
- Starring: Jaclyn Jose
- Cinematography: Odyssey Flores
- Edited by: Diego Marx Dobles
- Music by: Teresa Barrozo
- Production company: Center Stage Productions
- Distributed by: Solar Pictures
- Release dates: 18 May 2016 (Cannes); 6 July 2016 (Philippines)
- Running time: 110 minutes
- Country: Philippines
- Language: Filipino

Ma' Rosa is a 2016 Filipino drama film directed by Brillante Mendoza and written by Troy Espiritu. Starring Jaclyn Jose in the title role, the story follows a woman who was arrested with her husband for selling illegal drugs, while their children decided to bail them out of incompetent cops.

Produced by Center Stage Productions, the film was first premiered on May 18, 2016, at the 69th Cannes Film Festival in France, where it was selected to compete for the Palme d'Or. Jaclyn Jose won the award for Best Actress. It was selected as the Filipino entry for the Best Foreign Language Film at the 89th Academy Awards but it was not nominated.

== Plot ==
Rosa is married to Nestor, with whom she has three children. Rosa's family runs a sari-sari store in a neighborhood in Manila. The income from the small convenience store business alone isn't enough to meet the family's daily needs, so illegal drugs, particularly "ice" or crystal meth are also sold at Rosa's store. One day, police officers arrest Rosa and Nestor for selling drugs and ask them for "bail money" or a bribe for the couple's release. Rosa's children, left on their own to deal with the struggles of daily life, find a way to free their detained parents.

== Cast ==
- Jaclyn Jose as Rosa Reyes
- Julio Diaz as Nestor Reyes
- Baron Geisler as Sumpay
- Jomari Angeles as Erwin Reyes
- Neil Ryan Sese as Olivarez
- Mercedes Cabral as Linda
- Andi Eigenmann as Raquel Reyes
- Mark Anthony Fernandez as Castor
- Felix Roco as Jackson Reyes
- Mon Confiado as Sanchez
- Maria Isabel Lopez as Tilde
- Kristoffer King as Jomar

== Production ==
Director Brillante Mendoza decided to make the film to tackle the issue of small-scale drug selling in the Philippines, which he says is happening in the country, and described the situation as alarming. Mendoza noted that the concept of corruption, a subject of the film, appeals to a worldwide audience because it is a global issue, affecting many countries on varying scales.

Ma' Rosa was originally titled Palit Ulo. The film was shot in Mandaluyong during the rainy season of 2015 and was supported by the French distributor firm, Film Distribution.

== Reception ==
=== Critical reception ===
The film holds 78% rating on Rotten Tomatoes. Maggie Lee of Variety reviewed the film and said "Boasting a simple, coherent plot shot with real-time, handheld verismo, it’s a work of understated confidence that will not disappoint his festival acolytes, but probably won’t win many new converts". Peter Bradshaw of The Guardian stated that "Ma'Rosa is made with control and clarity, a narrative purpose which is held on to despite an apparently aimless docu-style, and a clear sense of jeopardy".

=== Accolades ===
Award	Date of ceremony	Category	Recipient(s)	Result
Cannes Film Festival	May 22, 2016	Best Actress Award	Jaclyn Jose	Won
Cannes Film Festival	May 22, 2016	Palm d'Or	Brillante Mendoza	Nominated
Gijón International Film Festival	November 26, 2016	Best Director	Brillante Mendoza	Won
Gijón International Film Festival	November 26, 2016	Grand Prix Asturias	Brillante Mendoza	Nominated

== In popular culture ==
During the final scene, Jaclyn Jose's character is seen eating fish balls while tearing up. This scene has become an iconic meme in Philippine internet culture, referencing “petsa de peligro” — the period when one is in financial distress before their next salary.

== See also ==
- List of submissions to the 89th Academy Awards for Best Foreign Language Film
- List of Philippine submissions for the Academy Award for Best Foreign Language Film
