= Let Us Through, Dear Ancestors =

2026 Philippine historical drama film

- Filipino: Makikiraan Po
- Directed by: Lav Diaz
- Written by: Lav Diaz
- Produced by: Bianca Balbuena; Montgomery Blencowe
- Starring: Bart Guingona; Ronnie Lazaro; Isabel Sandoval; Yul Servo; Christian Bables; Bong Cabrera
- Cinematography: Lav Diaz
- Edited by: Lav Diaz
- Production companies: C'est Lovi Productions; Epicmedia Productions; Sine Olivia Pilipinas
- Release date: September 11, 2026 (Venice)
- Running time: 151 minutes
- Country: Philippines
- Languages: Filipino; Spanish

Let Us Through, Dear Ancestors (Filipino: Makikiraan Po; lit. '[I am/we are] passing through') is a 2026 Philippine historical drama film written, shot, edited and directed by Lav Diaz. Set in 1617 during the Spanish colonial period in the Philippines, it stars Bart Guingona, Ronnie Lazaro, Isabel Sandoval, Yul Servo, Christian Bables and Bong Cabrera.

The film premiered out of competition at the 83rd Venice International Film Festival on September 11, 2026.

== Plot ==
In 1617, a Spanish friar and encomendero oversees the construction of a church in the Philippines while attempting to bring the native population under Catholic rule. He instructs his son Dungwen to supervise the transportation of limestone required for the church's construction, despite the possibility of attacks during the journey.

The story is set against the forced construction of churches during the Spanish colonial period, when thousands of native Filipinos were compelled to provide labor. The film presents the surviving churches as reminders of colonial violence, religious conversion, plunder and suffering.

== Cast ==
- Bart Guingona as Padre Enciso, a Spanish friar and encomendero
- Christian Bables as Dungwen
- Ronnie Lazaro as Himamat
- Isabel Sandoval as Babayeng Indimatandog
- Yul Servo as Baribari
- Bong Cabrera as Mang Tugis
- Rafa Siguion-Reyna as Higante
- Amado Arjay Babon as Diego
- Hazel Orencio

== Production ==
=== Development ===
The film was initially developed under the title Dungwen, after the character portrayed by Christian Bables. It was produced by Bianca Balbuena and Montgomery Blencowe, with Lovi Poe serving as an executive producer through her company, C'est Lovi Productions. The other participating production companies were Epicmedia Productions and Diaz's Sine Olivia Pilipinas. In an interview with FRED Film Radio, Lav Diaz discussed that one of the original producing team dropped out and producer "Monty saved the film".

Hazel Orencio, a frequent collaborator of Diaz, also worked as the film's line producer. The project marked the first collaboration between Diaz and both Bables and Isabel Sandoval. It was Yul Servo's first film role in nine years, having focused on his political career as Manila's third district representative and vice mayor; it also reunited him with Diaz, who had previously directed him in Batang West Side.

=== Filming ===
Principal photography took place in Sampaloc, Quezon. Diaz was also the director of photography and shot the film in digital black-and-white.

=== Themes ===
The original Filipino title, Makikiraan Po, comes from a phrase still used today by Filipino Malays passing through places believed to hold ancestral spirits.

== Release ==
Let Us Through, Dear Ancestors premiered out of competition of the 83rd Venice International Film Festival on September 11, 2026 winning the Premio Brian award

The film will be screened for Japanese Premiere on 30 October 2026 in the World Focus section of the 39th Tokyo International Film Festival. It will also have its Asian Premiere at the Busan International Film Festival. The film won the Critics Award at the 2026 Filmfest Hamburg

With a runtime of 151 minutes, it is Diaz's shortest feature film since Elegy to the Visitor from the Revolution in 2011.
