= Makronisos =

Island off Attica in the Aegean Sea

Native name: Μακρόνησος
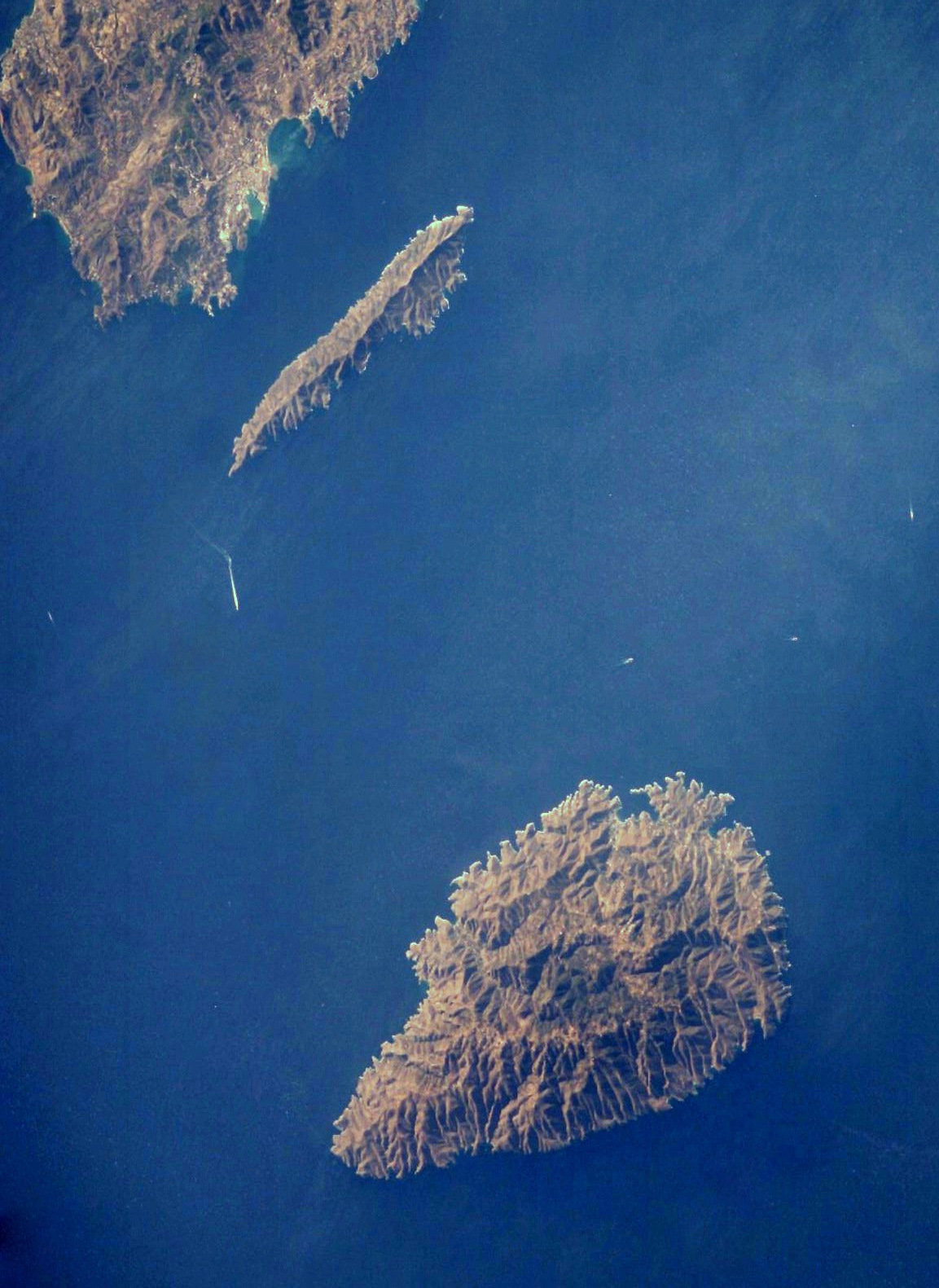
- Makronisos from space: Attica to the NW; Kea to the SE

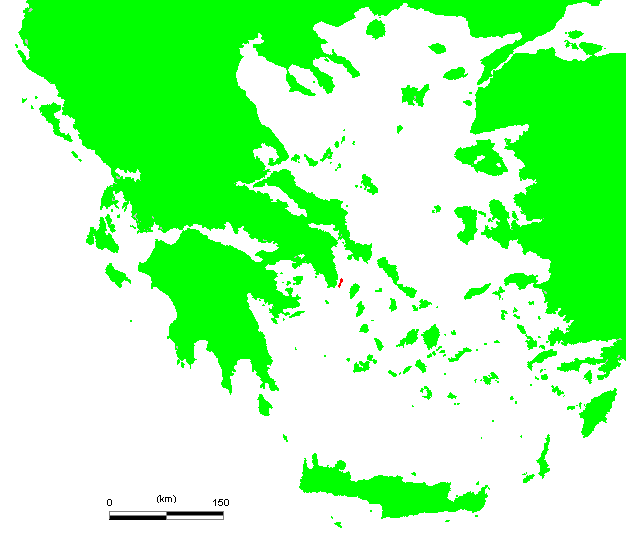

Geography
- Coordinates: 37°42′04″N 24°07′29″E
- Archipelago: None
- Area: 20 km^{2} (7.7 sq mi)
- Highest elevation: 281 m (922 ft)

Administration
- Greece
- Region: South Aegean
- Regional unit: Kea-Kythnos

Demographics
- Population: 5 (2001)

Additional information
- Postal code: 840 02
- Area code: 22880

Makronisos (Greek: Μακρόνησος, lit. Long Island), or Makronisi, is an island in the Aegean Sea, in Greece, notorious as the site of a political prison from the 1920s to the 1970s. It is located close to the coast of Attica, facing the port of Lavrio. The island has an elongated shape, 13 km (8 mi) north to south and 2.5 km (1.6 mi) east to west at its widest point, and its terrain is arid and rocky. It is the largest uninhabited Greek island.

It is part of the Kea-Kythnos regional unit and in the municipality of Kea.

== History ==
In ancient times the island was called Helene (Ancient Greek: Ἑλένη). It protected the ancient harbours of Thorikos and Sounion. It was also called Macris (Μάκρις), from its length. Strabo describes it as 60 stadia (9.4 km) in length; but its real length is seven geographical miles (12 km). It was uninhabited in antiquity, as it is at the present day; and it was probably only used then for the pasture of cattle. Both Strabo and Pausanias derive its name from Helen of Troy, the wife of Menelaus: the latter writer supposes that it was so called because Helen landed here after the capture of Troy; but Strabo identifies it with the Homeric Cranae, to which Paris fled with Helen, and supposes that its name was hence changed into Helena. There cannot, however, be any doubt that the Homeric Cranaë was opposite Gythium in Laconia.

The Kea Channel between Makronisos and neighbouring Kea was the site of the sinking of HMHS Britannic, sister ship of the RMS Olympic and RMS Titanic. She sank after striking a mine on 21 November 1916 with the loss of thirty lives. She was the largest ship lost during World War I.

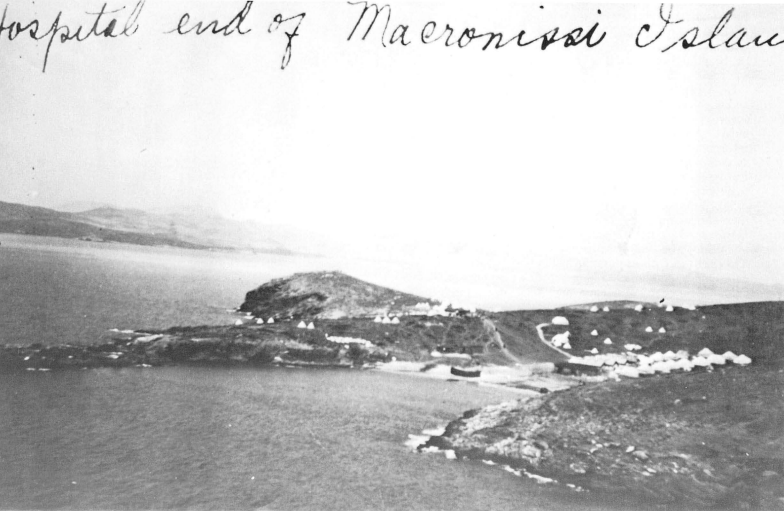
1924 photograph of Makronissos

After the Burning of Smyrna in 1922 and the population exchange between Greece and Turkey, Greek refugees from the Ottoman Empire were transferred to Makronisos, where a quarantine station (to minimize the spread of smallpox and typhus infection) was established. Between 1922 and 1923, 12,295 refugees, mostly women, children, and the elderly, passed through Makronisos.

=== Prison camp ===
Makronisos was used as a military prison island and concentration camp from the time of the Greek Civil War until the restoration of democracy, following the collapse of the Regime of the Colonels in 1974. Torture methods were used among others. Because of its history, it is considered a monument of the civil war era; therefore the island and the original structures on it are protected from alteration.

Among the prisoners of Makronisos were Apostolos Santas, Nikos Koundouros, Mikis Theodorakis, Leonidas Kyrkos, Yannis Ritsos, Manos Katrakis, Thanasis Vengos, and Georgios Varoufakis, the father of future Greek finance minister Yanis Varoufakis.

== Films ==
- Le Nouveau Parthénon (1975) by Kostas Chronopoulos and Giogos Chrysovitsianos.
- Happy Day (1976) by Pantelis Voulgaris.
- Makronissos (2008), by Ilias Giannakakis and Evi Karabatsou.
- Like Stone Lions at the Gateway into Night (2012), by Olivier Zuchuat
