= 1997 Palanca Awards =

Philippine literary award

47th Palanca Awards

The 47th Don Carlos Palanca Memorial Awards for Literature was held to commemorate the memory of Don Carlos Palanca Sr. through an endeavor that would promote education and culture in the country.

LIST OF WINNERS

The 1997 winners were divided into 22 categories, with the short story, short story for children, poetry, essay, one-act play, and full-length play open to both English and Filipino Divisions, and the Dulang Pantelebisyon and Dulang Pampelikula open only for the Filipino Division, and the short stories in Cebuano, Hiligaynon, and Iluko in the Regional Language Division.

== English Division ==
=== Short Story ===
- First Prize: David C. Martinez, "The Amulet"
- Second Prize: Clinton Palanca, "The Window"
- Third Prize: Ma. Romina M. Gonzales, "Welostit"

=== Short Story for Children ===
- First Prize: Natasha Vizcarra, "How My Sister Turned Me Into a Worm"
- Second Prize: Victoria Estrella C. Bravo, "Fetch"
- Third Prize: Jeanne Lim, "Speedy and Jet"

=== Poetry ===
- First Prize: Ma. Luisa A. Igloria, "Presence"
- Second Prize: David C. Martinez, "Shadow in the Sun"
- Third Prize: Francis C. Macasantos, "The Assassin and Other Poems"

=== Essay ===
- First Prize: Manuel L. Quezon III, "On Presidential Portraits"
- Second Prize: Melba Padilla Maggay, "Mother of Stories"
- Third Prize: Tomas C. Boquiren, "The Inner Life"

=== One-Act Play ===
- First Prize: No Winner
- Second Prize: Jose Victor Z. Torres, "A Daughter's Seed"
- Third Prize: Felix A. Clemente, "The Guest is Reluctant But..."

=== Full-Length Play ===
- First Prize: Crispin Ramos, "Return to Santander"
- Second Prize: Jorshinelle T. Sonza, "Dog Days in America"
- Third Prize: Behn Cervantes, "Istorya ni Bonipasyo: Kasla Gloria Ti Hawaii"

== Filipino Division ==
=== Maikling Kwento ===
- First Prize: Alvin B. Yapan, "Nang Gabing Mamatay ang Nana Soling"
- Second Prize: Mayette Bayuga, "Ang Baliw"
- Third Prize: Libay Linsangan Cantor, "Si Joe Cool Kasi"

=== Maikling Kwentong Pambata ===
- First Prize: Susie R. Baclagon-Borrero, "Salu-salo"
- Second Prize: Teresita G. Hizon, "May Lugar Kaya sa Langit Para sa Asong Batik-batik?"
- Third Prize: Libay Linsangan Cantor, "Si Totoy sa Gubat ng Diwata"

=== Tula ===
- First Prize: Roberto T. Añonuevo, "Pink Guba at Iba Pang Alinignig"
- Second Prize: Khavn De La Cruz, "Larombata"
- Third Prize: Roberto Ofanda Umil, "Pagkapaso ng Puso, Mga Tula ng Pagsuyo"

=== Sanaysay ===
- First Prize: Luis P. Gatmaitan, "Reseta at Letra: sa Daigdig ng Isang Doktor-Manunulat"
- Second Prize: Glecy C. Atienza, "Sa Aking Pinipintuho, Isang Sayaw ng Paghuhubad"
- Third Prize: Ma. Josephine Barrios, "Chapter Eight"

=== Dulang May Isang Yugto ===
- First Prize: Allan L. Palileo, "Lakhan Bini"
- Second Prize: Josephine Barrios, "Despidida"
- Third Prize: Jun F. Flavier Pablo, "Rogad por Nosotros"

=== Dulang Ganap ang Haba ===
- First Prize: Aurora D. Yumul, "In Karakter"
- Second Prize: John Iremil Teodoro, "Unang Ulan ng Mayo"
- Third Prize: Sid Gomez Hildawa, "Macho Motel"

=== Dulang Pantelebisyon ===
- First Prize: Rodolfo Lana Jr. and Peter Ong Lim, "Pula"
- Second Prize: Rodolfo Lana Jr., "23rd Floor"
- Third Prize: Edzel Cardil, "Par"

=== Dulang Pampelikula ===
- First Prize: Al A. Puedan, "Daluyong sa Dibdib"
- Second Prize: Rodolfo Lana Jr. and Peter Ong Lim, "Barber's Cut"
- Third Prize: Lav Indico Diaz, "West Side Avenue, JC"'

== Regional Division ==
=== Short Story [Cebuano] ===
- First Prize: Ernesto D. Lariosa, "Bugti"
- Second Prize: Ricardo I. Patalinjug, "Hangtod Matapos Ang Gabi"
- Third Prize: Genaro Enad Tanudtanud, "Sa Sabakan Sa Bukid"

=== Short Story [Hiligaynon] ===
- First Prize: Alfredo R. Siva, "Kami nga Waay Diri, Waay Didto"
- Second Prize: Alice Tan Gonzales, "Mga Luha Para Kay Tatay Jose"
- Third Prize: Alice Tan Gonzales, "Isa Ka Pompong Nga Rosas"

=== Short Story [Iluko] ===
- First Prize: Reynaldo A. Duque, "Colorum"
- Second Prize: Aurelio S. Agcaoili, "Ti Ligsay, Ti Anniniwan, Ken Ti Daton"
- Third Prize: Reynaldo A. Duque, "Gita Dagiti Ledda"

== Sources ==
- "The Don Carlos Palanca Memorial Awards for Literature | Winners 1997". Archived from the original on 2009-10-22.
