= Tamara Benitez =

Filipina cinematographer

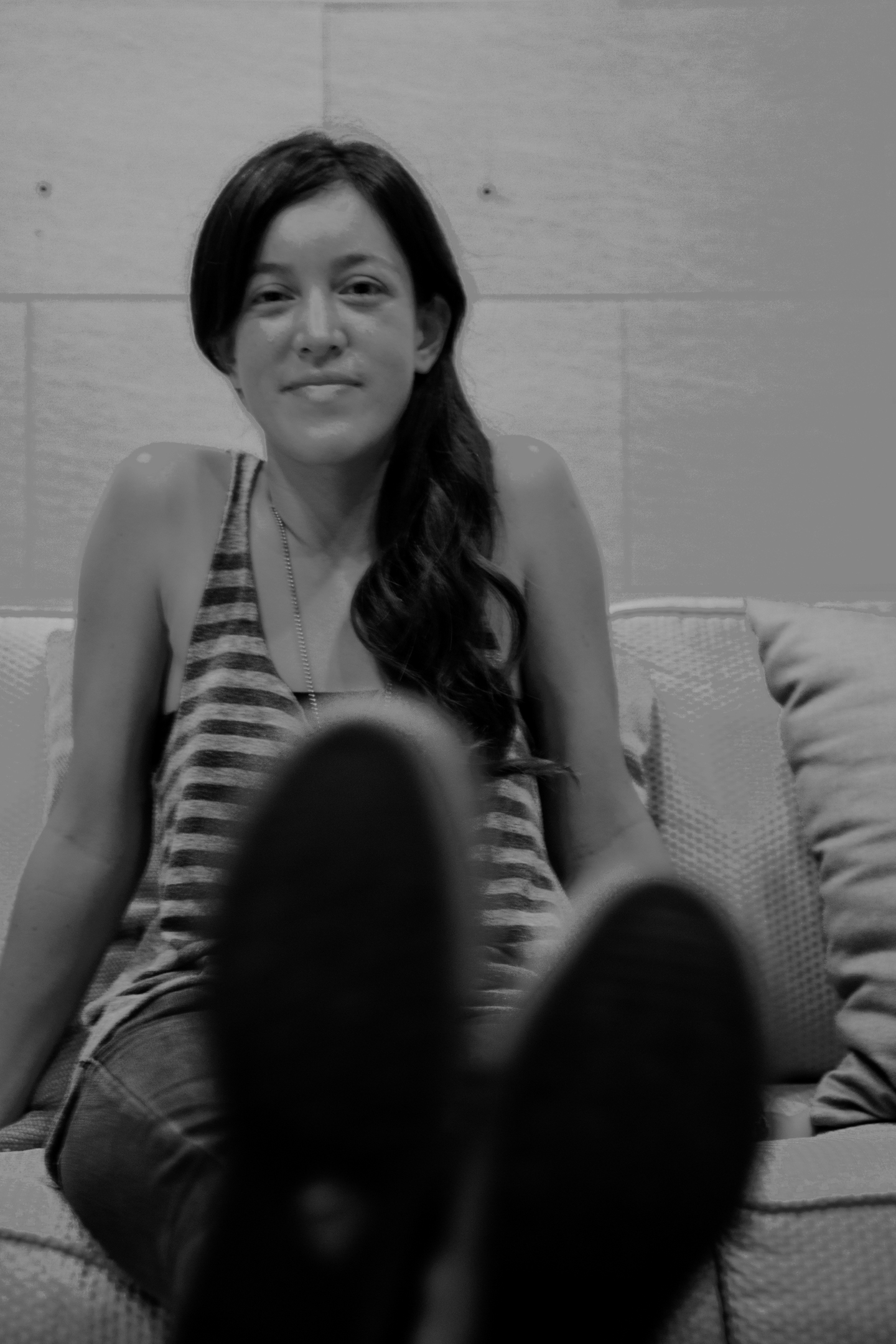
- Tamara Benitez by Martin Rey Aviles
- Born: October 14, 1983 (age 42); San Juan, Metro Manila, Philippines
- Occupations: Cinematographer, Producer, Surfer
- Known for: Underwater Cinematography

Tamara Benitez (also Mara Benitez) (born 14 October 1983) is a Filipina Cinematographer and camera operator, based in Metro Manila, Philippines. Known primarily for her underwater videography, Benitez has worked extensively for the ABS-CBN Corporation and under its production companies Star Cinema and VIVA Films, and has worked with such directors as Lav Diaz, Wenn Deramas, Sig Sanchez, Paolo Herras, and Martin Aviles. She has also worked with Cinematographer Arvin Viola on numerous occasions. Benitez is one of few female Cinematographers working in the cinema of the Philippines. In 2006 she was Director of Photography for the featured pictures Heremias and Lambanog, and in 2011 shot footage for the TV series Survivor India and served as Director of Photography for the TV series Where's Tony.

== Biography ==
Tamara Isabel Escudero Benitez was born on 14 October 1983 in San Juan, Metro Manila, Philippines. She is the daughter of a well-known Underwater Cinematographer. She is of mixed Spanish and Filipino heritage; her father is Filipino and her mother mestiza. She studied Cinematography at the Mowelfund Film Institute in 2003, where she was taught how to use a film camera by Larry Manda. In 2004, Benitez gained her first experience in filming as an assistant on the set of Laurenti Dyogi's romantic drama Now That I have You. Later that year she shot footage for Jeffrey Jeturian's major hit Minsan Pa (2004), as well as having a minor role as an American backpacker in it. A reviewer of Minsan Pa in the Manila Bulletin talked of "beautiful cinematography that makes much of Cebu's beautiful tourist spots (such as its famous dive sites in Moalboal)." Liz Braun of the Toronto Sun also praised the cinematography in Minsan Pa.

She made the 161 minute film Ang Anak ni Brocka in 2005 as a Berlinale Talent Campus project. It explores the life of Filipino director Lino Brocka. In 2006, Benitez was a cinematographer on the epic nine-hour 2006 film Heremias. Discussing Heremias, a reviewer was impressed by the work of Tamara Benitez, calling her "so young and so talented". later that year she was director of photography Lambanog, which featured Luis Alandy, John Lapus and C.J. Mercado. Benitez collaborated with director Paolo Herras, a third prize winner of Star Cinema's first scriptwriting contest, in shooting Lambanog, his first full-length digital film. The Manila Bulletin described the film as "a potent mix of innovative storytelling, anguished acting, and the supreme promise that films can go heretofore uncharted directions." She was also a camera operator for the Star Cinema and Viva Films vehicle Wag Kang Lilington, a horror movie starring Anne Curtis and Kristine Hermosa, in which she supported cinematographers Christopher Manjares and Lyle Sacris.

In 2007, Benitez served as a Second Unit Cinematographer/2nd Camera Operator on Wenn Deramas's comedy picture Pasukob, featuring Ai-Ai Delas Alas. The Manila Bulletin praised the makers of the film, saying "Indeed, "Pasukob," showing on Nov. 28, is a gathering of winners and is guaranteed to translate to success via the excellent production." In 2008, she again worked as a camera operator for a Deramas and Alas romantic comedy movie Ikaw pa rin: Bongga ka boy!. She shot footage in Vista Valley, Marikina and in Manila. In 2009, Benitez was camera operator for Ted Manotoc's film 69 1/2, a film billed as "The Making of the Most Artistic Filipino Pornographic Film Ever Made". She also served as a Second Unit Cinematographer on Mel Chionglo's Bente, supporting cinematographer Arvin Viola.

In 2010, Benitez was 2nd Camera Operator for Arvin Viola again on Gil Portes's Two Funerals, described by the Manila Bulletin as the "quintessential Filipino black comedy, a quirky road movie combining melodrama with satire." Footage for the film was shot in Antipolo, Rizal and the film scooped numerous awards, including the Balanghai Trophy for Best Cinematography - Directors Showcase at the Cinemalaya Independent Film Festival. In 2011, Benitez was employed as an underwater camera assistant in the shooting of Survivor India and also served as Director of Photography for Season 1 of the TV series, Where's Tony.

At present, Benitez is working as a producer under her brand ByTheSea, creating surf films for popular surfing brand Roxy Philippines, among others.

== Filmography ==
=== Film ===
- 2004 Now That I have You (2nd Gaffer)
- 2004 Minsan Pa (2nd Camera Operator)
- 2005 Ang Anak ni Brocka (Director of Photography)
- 2006 Heremias (Director of Photography)
- 2006 Lambanog (Director of Photography)
- 2006 Wag Kang Lilingon (Camera Operator)
- 2007 Ang Cute Ng Ina Mo! (Camera Operator)
- 2007 Four in One (Camera Operator)
- 2007 Pasukob (Second Unit Cinematographer/2nd Camera Operator)
- 2008 My Big Love (Camera Operator)
- 2008 Ikaw Pa Rin, Bongga Ka Boy! (Camera Operator)
- 2008 Ang Tanging Ina N'yong Lahat (Second Unit Cinematographer/2nd Camera Operator)
- 2009 69 1/2 (Camera Operator)
- 2009 Bente (Second Unit Cinematographer)
- 2010 Two Funerals (2nd Camera Operator)
- 2012 Ang Bangka Sa Pagitan ng Dalawang Ilog

=== Television shows ===
- 2009 Laf and Roll Pranks (Director of Photography)
- 2010 Channel [v] Encore (Lighting Director)
- 2011 Where's Tony Season 1 (Director of Photography)
- 2011 Survivor India Season 1 (Underwater Camera Assistant)
