= Death in the Land of Encantos =

- Official movie poster
- Tagalog: Kagadanan sa banwaan ning mga engkanto
- Directed by: Lav Diaz
- Screenplay by: Lav Diaz
- Produced by: Lav Diaz
- Starring: Roeder Camanag; Angeli Bayani; Perry Dizon; Dante Perez
- Cinematography: Lav Diaz
- Edited by: Lav Diaz; Jay Ramirez
- Music by: Lav Diaz
- Production company: Sine Olivia Pilipinas Production
- Release date: 2007 (Venice Film Festival)
- Running time: 9 hours
- Languages: Filipino, Tagalog

Death in the Land of Encantos (Tagalog: Kagadanan sa banwaan ning mga engkanto) is a Filipino experimental film co-produced, edited, written and directed by Lav Diaz. At 540 minutes (9 hours), it is among the longest films ever made. Awarded the NETPAC Prize, Best Asian Feature at the Jogja Asian Film Festival, the Jeonju FIPRESCI Prize, and Orizzonti Prize (Special Mention) at Venice Film Festival.

== Synopsis ==
After spending years in Russia, Benjamin, a Filipino poet returns to Bicol, his hometown after it has been devastated by super typhoon. He is horrified to discover that the entire village has been buried under the landslide. He wanders through the countryside, meeting old friends and former lovers while burying his dead.

== Cast ==
- Roeder Camanag as Benjamin
- Angeli Bayani as Catalina
- Perry Dizon as Teodoro
- Dante Perez as Mang Claro / Interviewer
- Sophia Aves as Amalia
- Soliman Cruz as Torturer
- Gemma Cuenca as Carmen
- At Maculangan as Father

== Reception ==
Writing for Cinema Scope Magazine, Robert Koehler praised the film, stating "It’s a cinema viewing experience without parallel, exactly recreating what happens if one were to stand in a large landscape and wait for a person to arrive from the extreme distance."

== Awards and nominations ==
| Year | Event | Category | Recipient | Result |
|---|---|---|---|---|
| 2007 | Venice Film Festival | Venice Horizons Award - Special Mention | Death in the Land of Encantos | Won |
| 2007 | Venice Film Festival | Venice Horizons Award | Lav Diaz | Nominated |
| 2008 | 31st Gawad Urian Awards | Best Film | Death in the Land of Encantos | Nominated |
| 2008 | 31st Gawad Urian Awards | Best Direction | Lav Diaz | Nominated |
| 2008 | 31st Gawad Urian Awards | Best Screenplay | Lav Diaz | Nominated |
| 2008 | 31st Gawad Urian Awards | Best Production Design | Lav Diaz; Dante Perez | Won |
| 2008 | 31st Gawad Urian Awards | Best Actor | Roeder Camanag | Nominated |

== See also ==
- List of longest films
