= Heremias =

2006 Filipino indie crime drama film

Heremias: Book One – The Legend of the Lizard Princess
- Official movie poster
- Unang Aklat: Ang Alamat ng Prinsesang Bayawak
- Directed by: Lav Diaz
- Written by: Lav Diaz
- Produced by: Celso De Guzman
- Starring: Ronnie Lazaro
- Cinematography: Tamara Benitez
- Edited by: Lia Martinez
- Music by: Earl Drilon
- Production companies: Sine Olivia; Hubert Bals Fund; Göteborg Film Festival; Cinemanila International Film Festival; National Commission for Culture and the Arts
- Release dates: 15 April 2006 (Hong Kong); 3 November 2006 (Cinemanila)
- Running time: 519 minutes
- Countries: Philippines; Netherlands; Sweden
- Languages: Filipino; Tagalog

Heremias: Book One – The Legend of the Lizard Princess (also Unang Aklat: Ang Alamat ng Prinsesang Bayawak) is a 2006 Filipino crime drama film written and directed by Lav Diaz. It stars Ronnie Lazaro and Sid Lucero, alongside a cow named Jordan. The 8-hour digital film (519 minutes) was produced by Celso De Guzman, with principal cinematography by Tamara Benitez, and was shot in Pililla, Rizal, Luzon. The film is "the story of a farmer who makes a pact with God to save a girl from rape."

== Plot ==
Heremias is a poor farmer who travels with a group of salesmen who sell appliances to people from their wagons. Heremias works with these salesmen in making their sales, but grows dissatisfied with the monotonous life that comes with this job. The other salesmen start noticing Heremias' unenthusiastic attitude while on the job, and Heremias eventually tells them that he wishes to leave the group of salesmen. The other salesmen attempt persuading him to come back, but they eventually realize that he wishes to travel on his own.

Heremias leaves the group on one of the wagons, and starts traveling on his own. As he continues traveling, he encounters a harsh rainstorm as he is traveling. The rainstorm uproots some tree branches, causing them to fall in his wagon's path. Heremias has to clean the path so him and his cow can go through the path. He manages to clean out the path and him and his cow are eventually able to get through after a difficult struggle to clean the path out. Heremias then continues traveling with his cow and then finds a place to stay for the night.

The next day, he decides to stay there and tend to his cow. That night, while he is resting, Heremias meets two men who are staying for the night. He talks with the two men, along with another man who comes along, and they have dinner together as they talk. Heremias then goes to sleep, complaining that he feels tired and "dizzy". The two men then continue talking as Heremias goes to sleep.

The next day, Heremias wakes up, only to find that his cow has been stolen and his cart was burned the other night by the two men. He also finds that all the appliances in the cart were taken by the two men. Heremias breaks down crying at this realization, and then realizes he must walk for the rest of his journey. He takes his remaining belongings with him and leaves, continuing his journey.

Heremias then asks to meet with Chief Fredo, one of the town officials, and Fredo sends his men out to search through the house to try to find the stolen belongings. However, they cannot find them, and the search proves unsuccessful. However, Heremias attempts to prove his case by recounting the story from that night to the officials. The other prime suspects, including the two men who were there that night, give their own accounts of what happened that night.

After this, Chief Fredo tells Heremias that it is best he leave the barrio and go someplace else where it is safe. Heremias tells Fredo that he will be leaving soon, and prepares to leave. However, before Heremias leaves, one of the officers, Sgt. Querubin asks him to consider paying him 50,000 pesos to support his case, that way the officials can resolve the case. However, Heremias tells Querubin that he doesn’t have money, and won’t be able to pay. Querubin tells him to consider paying the money, though.

Heremias then takes a bus, and, while on the bus, has a conversation with a man who tells him a legend of a “lizard princess” who supposedly controls one of the villages by keeping criminals out of the village. After Heremias takes the bus, he meets up with his salesmen again.

He then tells them about what happened while he was out—-his cart and cow having been stolen. However, they are unable to do anything about it, unfortunately. Heremias then tells one of the salesmen that night that he will be leaving the next morning. The salesman offers him some money, but he refuses it. Later that night, another salesman offers it to him, and Heremias finally accepts it before leaving.

Heremias then continues his journey, and first walks along several roads—-after walking these roads, he decides to go through the forest. After he goes through the forest, he continues walking along some of the roads—after this, he then stops at another forest and sleeps there for the night. As he stays there for a couple days, he finds an abandoned house there and observes several people staying there and their interactions.

That night, he observes a group of hooligans entering the abandoned house to stay there for the night, and they trip out on hallucinogens. As they trip out, they grow more aggressive and one of them starts beating the walls. They then become completely exhausted by the end of the trip—after this, the hooligans then reveal their plan to rape a young girl named Helena and then throw her in the river. Heremias overhears this plan, and, now shocked, then leaves the abandoned house.

Heremias then goes to Sgt. Querubin about the situation, and tells him about what happened at the abandoned house. Querubin questions Heremias about what happened, and Heremias explains more about what happened there. However, when Heremias tells him the name of the mastermind behind it, Bong Samson, Querubin tells him that Samson is the son of a powerful Congressman in office. Querubin warns him that if he were to tell anyone about what happened, he would be killed, since Congressman Samson is a powerful man. Heremias protests to Querubin that they must save the young girl, but is then shooed away by Querubin.

Heremias then finds a nearby church and goes in there to talk to the priest. He tells the priest about what happened at the abandoned house and tells him to pray for the young girl, Helena. The priest tells him to trust in God and that He will save Helena from the rape. Heremias then thanks the priest, and, before leaving, breaks down in tears for a moment and then leaves the church.

After he leaves the church, he goes back to Sgt. Querubin and tells him that he told the priest and that the priest said that it is the police's responsibility to save Helena from the men. However, Querubin becomes frustrated with Heremias over this and drives him to the forest. There, Querubin confronts Heremias and beats him in frustration—Querubin then leaves in anger, leaving Heremias laying there.

Heremias manages to recover from his injuries, and cries out to God in the forest. He promises God that he will sacrifice himself for Helena by walking for forty days and not eating for forty days, despite knowing that he will die doing so. He humbly asks God to save Helena, and cries out to Him in one last plea.

The next morning, Heremias leaves to begin his forty-day walk, and starts his journey.

== Cast ==
- Ronnie Lazaro as Heremias
- Jordan as The Cow
- Sid Lucero as Sgt. Querubin
- Dante Balois as Mang Tinong
- Roeder Camanag as Jerry
- Perry Dizon as Mando
- Simon Ibarra as Ed
- Mayen Estanero as Wife
- Aero Joy Damaso as Little Girl
- Winston Maique as Allan
- Bart Guingona as Diego
- Yul Servo as Tonio
- Noel Millares as Priest
- Lou Veloso as Mang Teban
- Fonz Deza as Kapitan Fredo

== Release ==
Heremias was first screened at the Hong Kong International Film Festival in April 2006 before running at various film festivals, including the Fribourg International Film Festival (FIFF) in Switzerland, the Cinemanila International Film Festival in the Philippines, the Göteborg Film Festival in Sweden, and the São Paulo International Film Festival in Brazil.

In the Philippines, the film was screened by organisers of the Bagong Agos Film Festival at a theater in Robinsons Galleria on January 23, 2007.

=== Reception ===
At FIFF, Diaz won the Special Jury Award and was nominated for the Grand Prix Award. Discussing Heremias, a reviewer was impressed by the work of Tamara Benitez, calling her "so young and so talented". Hayley Scanlon summarized: "With long sections playing out in near real time, extreme long distance shots often static in nature, and black and white photography captured on low res digital video which makes it almost impossible to detect emotional subtlety in the performances of its cast, Heremias is a challenging prospect yet an oddly hypnotic, ultimately moving one."

== Sequel ==
Since the completion of Book One, Diaz has been working on a sequel titled Heremias: Book Two – The Legend of the Invisible Island. As of March 2024, it remains incomplete.

== See also ==
- List of longest films
