= Lav Diaz =

Filipino film director (born 1958)

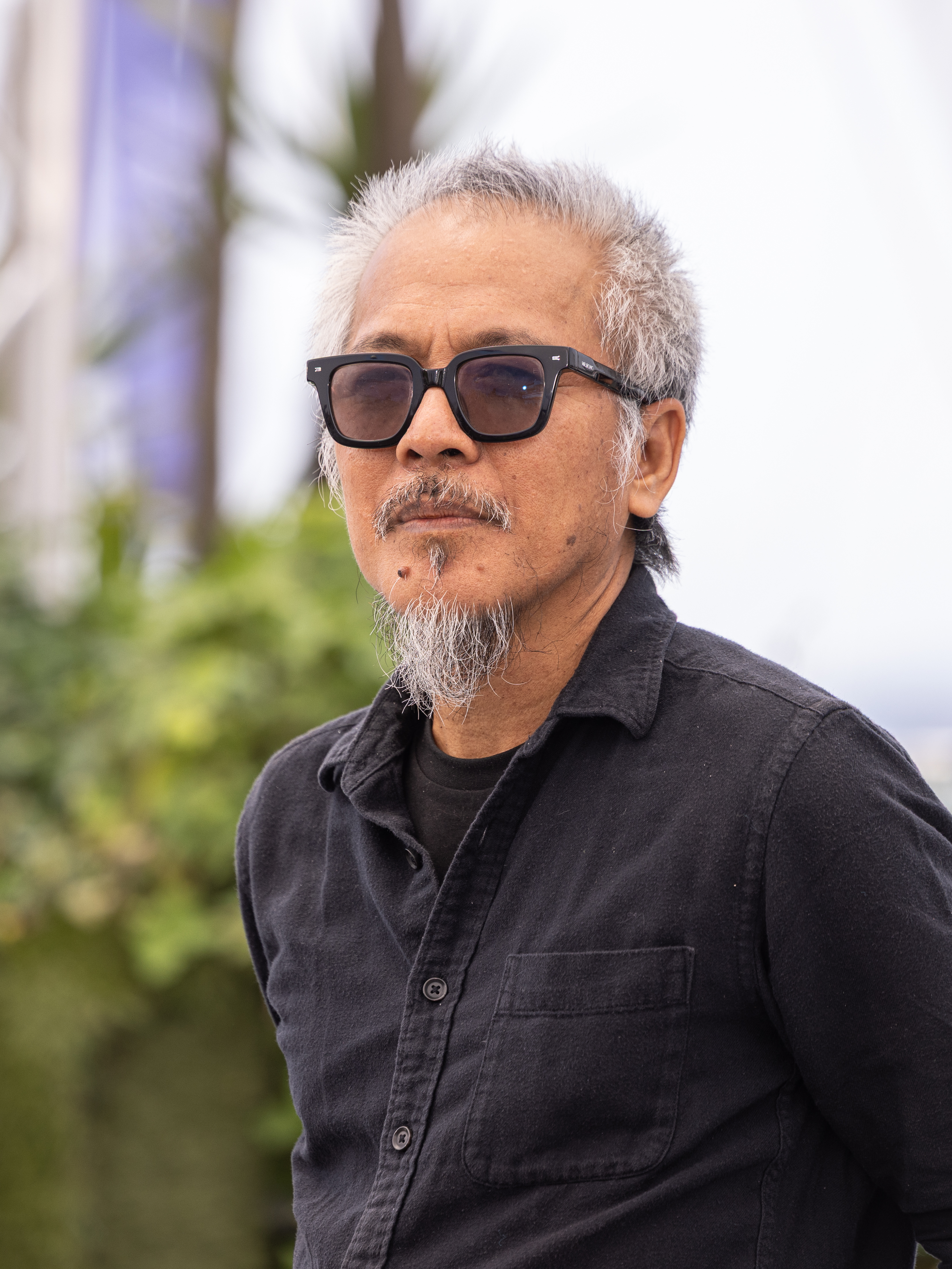
- Diaz at the 2025 Cannes Film Festival
- Born: Lavrente Indico Diaz; December 30, 1958 (age 67); Columbio, Cotabato, Philippines (Note: Sources frequently mentioned Datu Paglas in Maguindanao del Sur as his birthplace but Diaz's birth preceded its split from Columbio.)
- Other name: Bahagharing Timog
- Occupations: Filmmaker; film critic
- Notable work: Evolution of a Filipino Family; Norte, the End of History; From What Is Before; The Woman Who Left; Magellan
- Children: 3

Lavrente Indico Diaz (born December 30, 1958) is a Filipino filmmaker, actor, and former film critic. He is known as one of the key figures in the slow cinema genre, directing a diverse range of long narrative films that explore Philippine social and political themes with minimalist storytelling and long takes.

Diaz made his feature directorial debut with Serafin Geronimo: Ang Kriminal ng baryo Concepcion, released in 1998. Initially making low budget films within the Philippine studio system, he first came to prominence with Batang West Side (2001) and Evolution of a Filipino Family (2004), which both feature long running times that have become his trademark. Most of Diaz's work, which include Melancholia (2008), From What Is Before (2014), A Lullaby to the Sorrowful Mystery and The Woman Who Left (2016), have garnered critical acclaim at international film festivals such as Venice, Berlin, Cannes, and Locarno. Two of his films, Norte, the End of History (2013) and Magellan (2025), have been submitted by the Philippines for the Academy Award for Best International Feature Film.

== Early life and education ==
Diaz was born on December 30, 1958 in Columbio, Cotabato to Mario Diaz, an Ilocano from Guimba, Nueva Ecija, and Maria Indico, from Lambunao, Iloilo; both of his parents are teachers who had previously decided to volunteer for a government program and travel to Mindanao to assist in building schools. Lav Diaz was initially meant to be named "José", but his father Mario, whom he described as "a hardcore socialist" who loved Russian literature, settled on naming him after Lavrentiy Beria, the head of Joseph Stalin's secret police in the Soviet Union during World War II. According to his father, Diaz's family descended from Valentín Díaz, one of the founders of the Katipunan that initiated the Philippine Revolution in 1896. Diaz had a total of four siblings; an older brother, Bonifacio Diaz, died as an infant upon being given the wrong medication for his sickness at a hospital.

At the age of four, Diaz was nearly paralyzed by a sickness initially diagnosed as a rare form of polio (later discovered to be dystonia), and was bed-ridden for a year while his parents sought help from faith healers and doctors. He later recalled that "[the doctor] would dip me in very hot water with oil for hours, and I would be screaming and wailing all the time, in pain and in fear". After some time, Diaz's sickness began to subside, and he proceeded to relearn how to walk beginning with crawling. His motor functions never fully returned to its initial state, and Diaz grew to be shy and reclusive.

Diaz's childhood was marked by the presence of violent conflicts between Muslim armed groups and the Philippine government, although Diaz himself did not personally witness the conflict. Due to the dangerous situation, his family moved to the more peaceful town of Tacurong in what is now Sultan Kudarat where he finished his high school education. Diaz has cited his father Mario, a cinephile, as one of his influences in cinema, having spent time watching double features with his father at a cinema in Tacurong growing up. Diaz graduated in 1980 with an economics degree from Notre Dame University in Cotabato City.

== Film career ==
=== Early career ===
Diaz moved to Manila, where he wrote for various publications, including the Manila Standard, Ang Masa and We Forum. His short story "Pula, Puti at Saka Blu, at Marami Pang Kolor", which he wrote under the pseudonym Bahagharing Timog, won second place at the 1990 Palanca Awards in the Short Story - Filipino category. Diaz also became a production assistant for Philippine Educational Theater Association (PETA)'s TV show Balintataw.

After attending multiple film workshops, Diaz made two short films, Banlaw (1985) and Step No, Step Yes (1988). He later moved to New York City to study filmmaking.

Diaz’s first feature films were produced by Lily Monteverde’s Good Harvest Productions, which specialized in ultra-low-budget “pito-pito” films. His debut, Serafin Geronimo: Ang Kriminal ng baryo Concepcion (1998), starred Raymond Bagatsing and was said to be inspired by Fyodor Dostoyevsky’s novel Crime and Punishment. It was followed by 1999’s Hubad sa Ilalim ng Buwan, an erotic drama starring Klaudia Koronel and Joel Torre, and Burger Boys, also released in the same year.

Batang West Side, a five-hour epic depicting the Filipino diaspora in the United States, was the longest Filipino film at its release in 2001 and became Diaz’s breakthrough. Starring Joel Torre, Gloria Diaz, and Yul Servo, it won 10 Gawad Urian Awards in 2002 and won Best Asian Feature Film at the Singapore International Film Festival in the same year. Batang West Side was restored in 2015 by the Austrian Film Museum and re-released by North American distributor Kani Releasing in 2025 as part of its 25th anniversary. In between making Batang West Side, Diaz made another film for Good Harvest, the dystopian action film Hesus, Rebolusyonaryo (2002).

Diaz started filming Evolution of a Filipino Family in 1994, continuing sporadically over the next ten years as he sought funding. An epic about a rural family dealing with changes in Philippine society brought by President Ferdinand Marcos’s martial law rule, it premiered at the 2004 Toronto International Film Festival with a runtime of ten hours, surpassing Batang West Side as the longest Filipino film of all time.

In 2006, Diaz premiered the eight-hour epic Heremias, Book One: The Legend of the Lizard Princess, the first in a planned diptych starring Ronnie Lazaro, at Hong Kong International Film Festival. Death in the Land of Encantos, a nine-hour epic set in the aftermath of Typhoon Durian in Bicol, received a Special Mention award at the 64th Venice International Film Festival in 2007 as part of the Orizzonti section. In 2008, the seven-hour Melancholia won Best Film in the same section at the 65th Venice International Film Festival.

=== 2010s ===
In 2011, the six-hour epic Century of Birthing premiered at the 68th Venice International Film Festival as part of the Orizzonti section. Diaz also released the 80-minute film Elegy to the Visitor from the Revolution, his shortest feature to date.

Florentina Hubaldo, CTE won the NETPAC-Eastar Jet award at the 13th Jeonju International Film Festival in 2012. Diaz reshot the film from a prior cut titled Agonistes, Myth of a Nation in 2009. An Investigation on the Night That Won’t Forget, released in the same year, is a documentary centering on the 2009 murders of film critic Alexis Tioseco, who had championed Diaz’s work, and his girlfriend Nika Bohinc.

Norte, the End of History, a four-hour loose adaptation of Crime and Punishment, premiered at the 2013 Cannes Film Festival as part of the Un Certain Regard section. It was selected as the Philippines’ submission at the 87th Academy Awards for Best International Feature Film, but was not nominated.

In 2014, From What Is Before, a five-hour historical epic set a few days before President Marcos declared martial law in 1972, premiered at the 67th Locarno Film Festival, where it won the Golden Leopard award. It was later acquired by Mubi for global distribution. In the same year, Storm Children: Book One, a documentary about the aftermath of Typhoon Haiyan in the city of Tacloban, premiered at the DMZ International Documentary Film Festival in 2014.

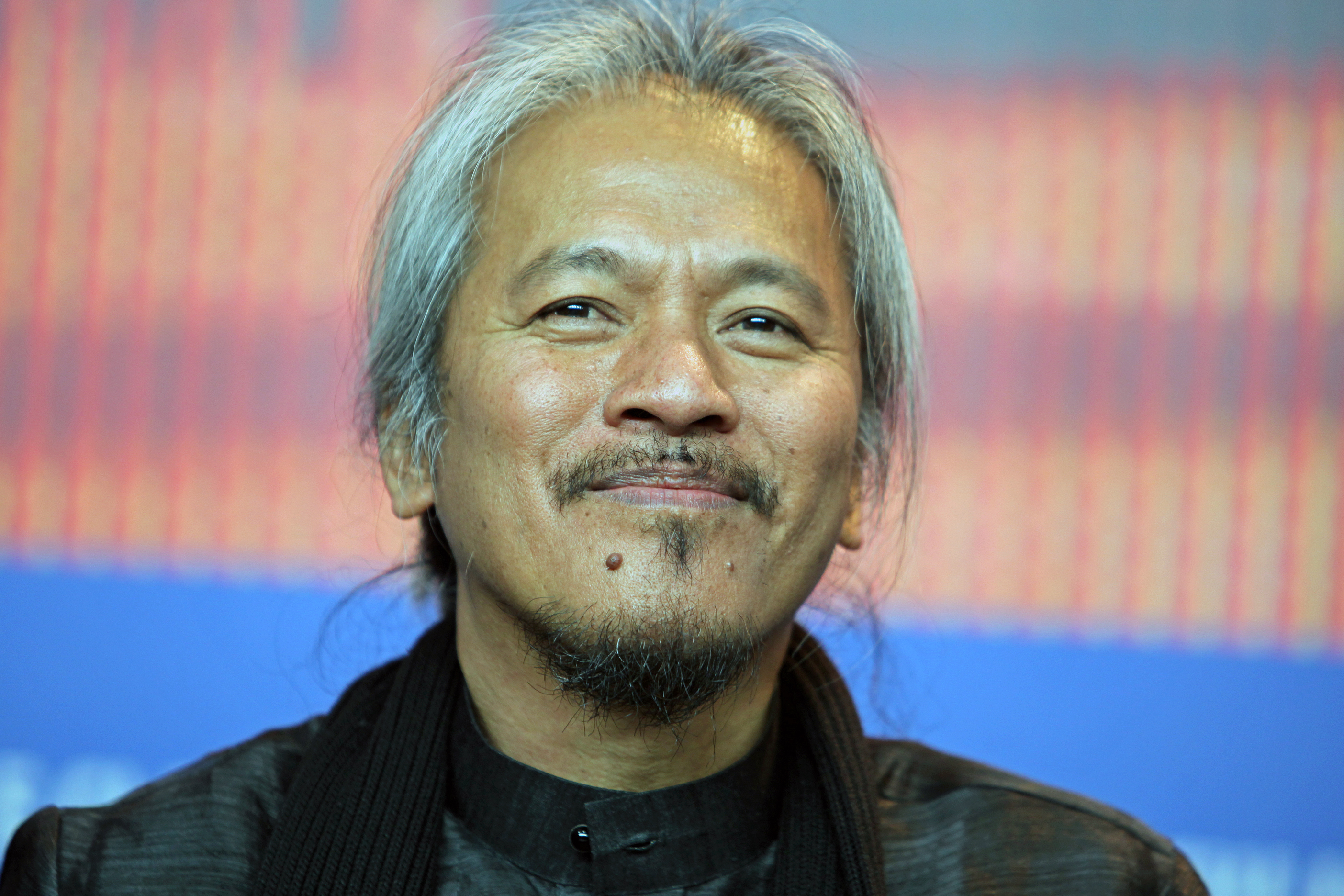
Diaz in 2016

Diaz released two films in 2016. A Lullaby to the Sorrowful Mystery, an eight-hour historical epic set during the Philippine Revolution, competed for the Golden Bear at the 66th Berlin International Film Festival, where it won the Alfred Bauer Prize. The Woman Who Left, a four-hour drama inspired by Leo Tolstoy’s short story “God Sees the Truth, But Waits”, starred Charo Santos and John Lloyd Cruz. It won the Golden Lion award at the 73rd Venice International Film Festival.

Diaz was invited by the Academy of Motion Picture Arts and Sciences to join as a member in July 2017.

Season of the Devil, a four-hour musical film set during the martial law era, premiered at the 68th Berlin International Film Festival in 2018, where it competed for the Golden Lion. The film starred Piolo Pascual and Shaina Magdayao, who also starred in The Halt, a four-hour dystopian drama, which premiered at the 2019 Cannes Film Festival as part of the Director’s Fortnight lineup.

=== 2020s ===
Genus Pan premiered at the 77th Venice International Film Festival in 2020 as part of the Orizzonti section, where Diaz won the Best Director award. An expanded version of Diaz’s segment “Hugaw” from the omnibus film Lakbayan (2018), which also featured segments by Kidlat Tahimik and Brillante Mendoza, it is his shortest feature since Elegy to the Visitor from the Revolution at 157 minutes.

History of Ha, a four-hour period drama set after the death of President Ramon Magsaysay in a plane crash in 1957, marked Diaz’s fourth collaboration with John Lloyd Cruz. It premiered at the BFI London Film Festival in 2021. Cruz also starred in Diaz’s seven-hour historical epic A Tale of Filipino Violence, an adaptation of Ricky Lee's short story and screenplay “Servando Magdamag”, which premiered at FIDMarseille in 2022. Plans for an eight-part television series to be streamed at iWantTFC were later scrapped as of 2026.

Later in 2022, When the Waves Are Gone, also starring Cruz as detective Hermes Papauran, premiered out of competition at the 79th Venice International Film Festival. It was followed by the prequel Essential Truths of the Lake, which premiered at the 76th Locarno Film Festival in 2023.

In 2024, Diaz’s four-hour drama Phantosmia premiered out of competition at the 81st Venice International Film Festival. In 2025, Magellan, an international production starring Gael Garcia Bernal as Portuguese explorer Ferdinand Magellan, premiered out of competition at the 78th Cannes Film Festival. It was selected as the Philippines’ submission at the 98th Academy Awards for Best International Feature Film, Diaz's second after Norte, the End of History.

In 2026, the historical epic Let Us Through, Dear Ancestors premiered out of competition at the 83rd Venice International Film Festival.

=== Upcoming projects ===
Henrico’s Farm, Diaz’s second collaboration with Charo Santos, was first announced in 2017 and filmed in Singapore. It remains unreleased as of 2026.

In 2019, Beatriz, The Wife was announced as a nine-hour film centering on Ferdinand Magellan’s titular spouse, before a shorter cut focusing on the explorer was eventually released as Magellan in 2025. In the same year, Diaz was announced to direct Ang Araw ng Itim na Nazareno as a co-production with Spring Films, starring Piolo Pascual.

Kawalan, a historical drama set during World War II, was first announced as a work-in-progress in 2024 and is in post-production as of 2026.

In 2025, Diaz was announced to direct An Amazon, based on a short story by Alexandre Dumas and slated to be his first film in the English language.

The Sadness of the Portuguese Woman, the third entry in Diaz’s Hermes Trilogy, is set in Portugal and stars Monica Calle as detective Ines Horta. As of 2026, it is in post-production.

In an interview with Variety at the Venice premiere of Let Us Through, Dear Ancestors in 2026, Diaz revealed that he is developing two projects, one on “false prophets” and the other on the making of Jose Rizal’s 1887 novel Noli Me Tangere.

== Political views ==
Similar to his father, Diaz is a socialist, having expressed admiration for Filipino revolutionaries such as New People's Army leaders Bernabe "Kumander Dante" Buscayno and Gregorio "Ka Roger" Rosal. He has described himself as a "Malay" instead of a Filipino (although he shared in an interview that "Maybe I'm just rhetorical about it"), and wishes to deemphasize national borders in his filmmaking ("I'm branding it as Malay cinema, but it's just about cinema."). Diaz stated that he holds a fatalistic view of life.

In December 2023, alongside 50 other filmmakers, Diaz signed an open letter published in Libération demanding a ceasefire and an end to the killing of civilians amid the 2023 Israeli invasion of the Gaza Strip, and for a humanitarian corridor into Gaza to be established for humanitarian aid, and the release of hostages.

== Personal life ==
Diaz has three children. One of his daughters experienced the same disease he had during his childhood, which was soon diagnosed as a condition called dystonia after she enrolled in a study at Columbia University.

In late 2003, he underwent an operation to remove a mass of cancer between his lungs and above his heart, and was assisted by actor Joel Torre in raising funds for his treatment.

== Filmography ==
=== Feature films ===
Year	English title	Original title	Credited as					Notes	Length
Year	English title	Original title	Director	Writer	Producer	Editor	Cinematographer	Notes	Length
1998	The Criminal of Barrio Concepcion	Serafin Geronimo: Ang Kriminal ng Baryo Concepcion	Yes	Yes	No	No	No	Directorial debut	132 min (2:12)
1999	Burger Boys		Yes	No	No	No	No		112 min (1:52)
1999	Naked Under the Moon	Hubad sa Ilalim ng Buwan	Yes	Yes	No	No	No		110 min (1:50)
2001	West Side Avenue	Batang West Side	Yes	Yes	No	No	No		315 min (5:15)
2002	Hesus the Revolutionary	Hesus, Rebolusyonaryo	Yes	Yes	No	No	No		112 min (1:52)
2004	Evolution of a Filipino Family	Ebolusyon ng Isang Pamilyang Pilipino	Yes	Yes	Yes	Yes	No		624 min (10:24)
2006	Heremias (Book One: Legend of the Lizard Princess)	Heremias (Unang Aklat: Ang Alamat ng Prinsesang Bayawak)	Yes	Yes	No	No	No		519 min (8:39)
2007	Death in the Land of Encantos	Kagadanan sa Banwaan ning Mga Engkanto	Yes	Yes	Yes	Yes	Yes		541 min (9:01)
2008	Melancholia		Yes	Yes	Yes	Yes	Yes	Also composer	447 min (7:27)
2009	Butterflies Have No Memories	Walang Alaala ang mga Paru-Paro	Yes	Yes	Yes	Yes	Yes		61 min (1:01)
2011	Century of Birthing	Siglo ng Pagluluwal	Yes	Yes	Yes	Yes	Yes	also composer	359 min (5:59)
2011	Elegy to the Visitor from the Revolution	Elehiya sa Dumalaw Mula sa Himagsikan.	Yes	Yes	Yes	Yes	Yes		80 min (1:20)
2012	Florentina Hubaldo, CTE		Yes	Yes	Yes	Yes	No		366 min (6:06)
2013	Norte, the End of History	Norte, Hangganan ng Kasaysayan	Yes	Yes	No	Yes	No	co-written with Rody Vera; Nominated - Best International Film at the 2015 Independent Spirit Awards. Nominated - Un Certain Regard at the 2013 Cannes Film Festival.	250 min (4:10)
2014	From What Is Before	Mula sa Kung Ano ang Noon	Yes	Yes	Yes	Yes	Yes	Winner Golden Leopard at the 2014 Locarno Film Festival	339 min (5:39)
2014	Storm Children: Book One	Mga Anak ng Unos: Unang Aklat	Yes	Yes	Yes	Yes	Yes	Documentary	143 min (2:23)
2016	A Lullaby to the Sorrowful Mystery	Hele sa Hiwagang Hapis	Yes	Yes	Yes	Yes	No	Premiered at 2016 Berlin Film Festival In Competition	489 min (8:09)
2016	The Woman Who Left	Ang Babaeng Humayo	Yes	Yes	Yes	Yes	Yes	Adapted from the short story "God Sees the Truth, But Waits" by Leo Tolstoy. Winner Golden Lion at the 2016 Venice Film Festival	229 min (3:49)
2018	Season of the Devil	Ang Panahon ng Halimaw	Yes	Yes	Yes	Yes	No	Also composer. Premiered at 2018 Berlin Film Festival in Competition	234 min (3:54)
2019	The Halt	Ang Hupa	Yes	Yes	Yes	Yes	No		283 min (4:43)
2020	Genus Pan	Lahi, Hayop	Yes	Yes	Yes	Yes	Yes	Re-edited material from an abandoned 2014 feature film.	157 min (2:37)
2021	History of Ha	Historya ni Ha	Yes	Yes	Yes	Yes	Yes		273 min (4:33)
2022	A Tale of Filipino Violence	Isang Salaysay ng Karahasang Pilipino	Yes	Yes	Yes	Yes	Yes	Adapted from Ricardo Lee's short story and screenplay of "Servando Magdamag"; premiered at FIDMarseille.	409 min (6:49)
2022	When the Waves Are Gone	Kapag Wala Nang Mga Alon	Yes	Yes	Yes	Yes	No	Premiered at the 79th Venice International Film Festival, out of competition	187 min (3:07)
2023	Essential Truths of the Lake		Yes	Yes	No	Yes	Yes	Premiered at the 76th Locarno Film Festival	215 min (3:35)
2024	Phantosmia		Yes	Yes	Yes	Yes	Yes	Premiered at the 81st Venice International Film Festival, out of competition	245 min (4:05)
2025	Magellan	Magalhães	Yes	Yes	No	Yes	Yes	Premiered at the 2025 Cannes Film Festival	156 min (2:36)
2026	Let Us Through, Dear Ancestors	Makikiraan po	Yes	Yes	TBA	TBA	TBA	Premiere at the 83rd Venice International Film Festival	147 min (2:27)
TBA	Kawalan		Yes	Yes	—N/a	Yes	Yes	Post-production	
TBA	Henrico's Farm	Ang Saka ni Henrico	Yes	Yes	—N/a	Yes	Yes	Post-production	
TBA	An Amazon		Yes	Yes	—N/a	—N/a	—N/a	Pre-production, first work in English	

=== Omnibus films ===
Year	Title	Segment	Notes
2006	Imahe Nasyon	"Nang Matapos ang Ulan"	Anthology film to commemorate the 20th anniversary of the People Power Revolution, with all segments starring Pen Medina.
2009	Visitors	"Walang Alaala ang Mga Paruparo"	A short version was commissioned for the 2009 Jeonju International Film Festival. Visitors also features segments by Naomi Kawase and Hong Sang-soo.
2013	Venice 70: Future Reloaded	"Ang Alitaptap"	Commissioned for the 70th Venice International Film Festival.
2015	Fragment	"Ang Araw Bago ang Wakas"	Commissioned by the Asian Film Archive for their 10th anniversary.
2018	Lakbayan	"Hugaw"	Also features segments by Brillante Mendoza and Kidlat Tahimik
2019	30th anniversaire of FIDMarseille	"Marta"	Commissioned for the 30th anniversary of FIDMarseille
2020	Liminal	"Malamig ang Mundo"	Commissioned by the UNAM International Film Festival (FICUNAM) alongside Manuela de Laborde, Oscar Enriquez, and Philippe Grandrieux.

=== Short films ===
Year	English title	Original title	Notes
2013	Prologue to the Great Desaparecido	Prologo sa ang Dakilang Desaparecido	Preview for Diaz's then-upcoming feature film The Great Desaparecido, elements of which were later included in A Lullaby to the Sorrowful Mystery, about Gregoria de Jesus's search for her husband Andres Bonifacio's remains.
2018	The Boy Who Chose the Earth		Two-minute trailer for the 56th Vienna International Film Festival.
2020		Himala: Isang Diyalektika ng Ating Panahon	Eight-minute reaction video to the 1982 film Himala, screened during the Gabi ng Himala online fundraising event to help Filipino film crew affected by the COVID-19 pandemic.
2024	Faith	Faith	One-minute trailer for the Austrian Film Museum on its 60th anniversary.

=== Writer only ===
Year	Title	Notes
1991	Mabuting Kaibigan, Masamang Kaaway	Co-written with Tony Mortel, Jose F. Bartolome and Manny Buising; directed by Augusto Salvador
1991	Daddy Goon	Co-written with Jose F. Bartolome and Rodolfo T. Meyer; directed by Rudy Meyer
1993	Galvez: Hanggang sa Dulo ng Mundo Hahanapin Kita	Co-written with Henry Nadong; directed by Manuel Fyke Cinco
2013	Alamat ni China Doll	Directed by Adolfo Alix Jr.
2019	Mañanita	Directed by Paul Soriano

=== Selected acting roles and documentary appearances ===
==== Film ====
Year	Title	Role	Notes
2004	Pugot	Taga	Directed by Khavn
2004	Todo Todo Teros	Himself	Directed by John Torres
2007	Green Rocking Chair	Himself	Directed by Roxlee
2009	Independencia	Townspeople	Directed by Raya Martin
2009	Manila	Director	Directed by Adolfo Alix Jr. and Raya Martin
2009	Himpapawid	Cameo	Directed by Raymond Red
2010	Philippine New Wave: This Is Not a Film Movement	Himself	Documentary
2012	Colossal	Shaman	Directed by Whammy Alcazaren
2014	Echoserang Frog	Himself	Directed by Joven Tan
2014	Lorna	Rodolfo	Directed by Sigrid Andrea Bernardo
2015	The Last Pinoy Action King	Himself	Documentary
2015	Salvage	Nilalang	Directed by Sherad Anthony Sanchez
2016	Singing in Graveyards	Paul	Directed by Bradley Liew
2016	Lily	Drunk Man	Directed by Keith Deligero
2019	Habambuhay: Remembering Philippine Cinema	Himself	Documentary
2024	Schirkoa: In Lies We Trust	Poet (voice)	Directed by Ishan Shukla
2024	Makamisa: Phantasm of Revenge	Kristo Kastrado	Directed by Khavn
2024	Real Life Fiction	Pawnshop Owner	Directed by Paul Soriano
2024	Moneyslapper	Lucas	Directed by Bor Ocampo
2024	Cinemartyrs	Kristo	Directed by Sari Dalena
TBA	The Sacrifice	Pilo	Post-production

==== Television ====
Year	Title	Role	Notes
2026	Call My Manager	Self	Episode 5

=== Television ===
Year	Title	Credited as		Notes	Ref(s).
Year	Title	Director	Writer	Notes	Ref(s).
1989, 1991	Balintataw	No	Yes	"Iskolar" two-part episode; "Lenny" episode	

== Awards and nominations ==
Year	Film	Film festival	Category	Result	Refs.
2002	Batang West Side	2002 Brussels International Film Festival	Golden Iris (Best Film)	Won	
2002	Batang West Side	15th Singapore International Film Festival	Best Asian Feature Film	Won	
2006	Heremias (Book One: Legend of the Lizard Princess)	20th Fribourg International Film Festival	Grand Prix	Nominated	
2006	Heremias (Book One: Legend of the Lizard Princess)	20th Fribourg International Film Festival	Special Jury Award	Won	
2007	Death in the Land of Encantos	64th Venice International Film Festival	Best Film (Horizons)	Nominated	
2007	Death in the Land of Encantos	64th Venice International Film Festival	Special Mention (Horizons)	Won	
2008	Melancholia	65th Venice International Film Festival	Best Film (Horizons)	Won	
2012	Florentina Hubaldo, CTE	25th Images Festival	On Screen Award	Won	
2012	Florentina Hubaldo, CTE	13th Jeonju International Film Festival	NETPAC Easter Jet Award	Won	
2013	Norte, the End of History	66th Cannes Film Festival	Prix Un Certain Regard	Nominated	
2014	From What Is Before	67th Locarno Film Festival	Golden Leopard	Won	
2016	A Lullaby to the Sorrowful Mystery	66th Berlin International Film Festival	Golden Bear	Nominated	
2016	A Lullaby to the Sorrowful Mystery	66th Berlin International Film Festival	Alfred Bauer Prize (Silver Bear)	Won	
2016	The Woman Who Left	73rd Venice International Film Festival	Golden Lion	Won	
2018	Season of the Devil	68th Berlin International Film Festival	Golden Bear	Nominated	
2020	Genus, Pan	77th Venice International Film Festival	Best Director (Horizons)	Won	
2022	When the Waves Are Gone	53rd International Film Festival of India	Special Jury Award and Special Mention	Won	
2025	Magellan	70th Valladolid International Film Festival	Golden Spike	Won	
2026	Let Us Through, Dear Ancestors	83rd Venice International Film Festival	Brian Award	Won	

== Further publications ==
- Diaz, Lav. Batang West Side, Edition Filmmuseum, 2-disc set, 2022 Österreichisches Filmmuseum
- Guarneri, Michael. Conversations with Lav Diaz. Piretti - Bologna - 2021
- Corinne Maury, Olivier Zuchuat (dir.), Lav Diaz : faire face, Paris, Post Editions, 2022, 365 p.
- Corinne Maury, Olivier Zuchuat (eds.), The Transformative Cinema of Lav Diaz. Aesthetics, Resistance and Resilience, Routledge, coll. "Critical Asian Cinema", 2026, 188 p.
