= Miguel/Michelle =

1998 Philippine drama film

- Directed by: Gil Portes
- Written by: Gil Portes; Ricky Lee
- Starring: Romnick Sarmenta; Gloria Diaz
- Release date: July 8, 1998
- Running time: 107 minutes
- Country: Philippines
- Language: Tagalog

Miguel/Michelle is a 1998 Philippine drama film starring Romnick Sarmenta and Gloria Diaz which tells a story about a man who leaves the Philippines and comes back as a woman, challenging her family to reexamine their feelings about homosexuality/transsexuality along with family values and religion.

== Plot ==
Miguel, a young man from Quezon province, leaves the Philippines for the U.S. After seven years, he returns home, and his family discovers he has had a sex change operation and is now Michelle. Her father is stunned by this development, and other hostile reactions erupt. She declares she will stay until her family accepts her. She has also caused a crisis for an old friend who was going to get married without ever admitting he was gay. Michelle's bravery makes him think again.

== Cast ==
- Romnick Sarmenta as Miguel/Michelle de la Cruz
- Gloria Diaz as Tinang
- Ray Ventura as Nano
- Cris Villanueva as Julio
- Mylene Dizon as Sonia
- Gandong Cervantes as Fr. Rav
