= Corinne Maury =

French lecturer in film studies

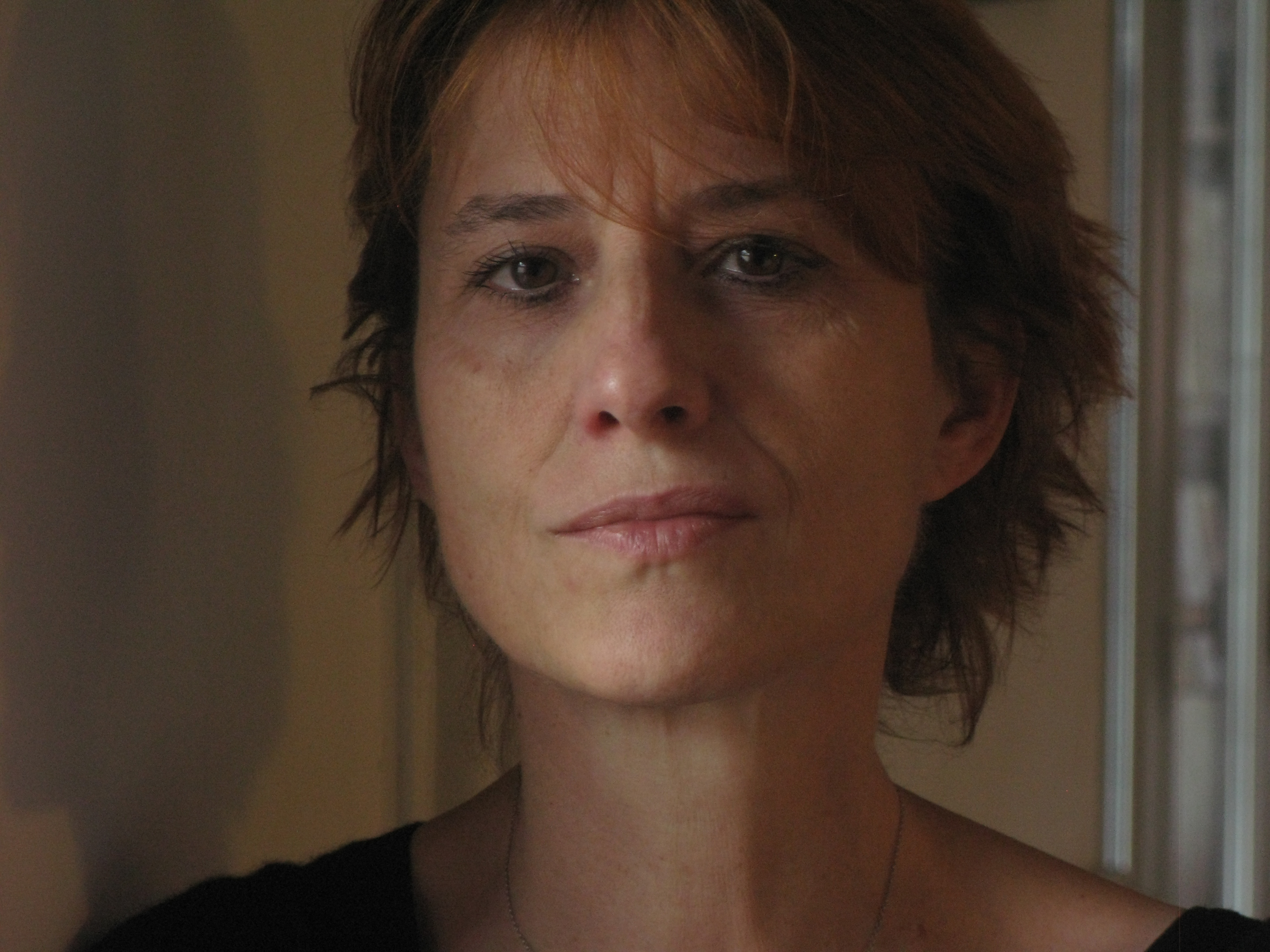
Corinne Maury in 2018

Corinne Maury is a professor in film studies at University of Poitiers as well as a film director.

== Career ==
Maury defended her doctoral thesis Habiter le monde : figures poétiques dans le cinéma du réel at the University of Paris III: Sorbonne Nouvelle in 2008.

From 2009 to 2025, she has been a teacher-researcher at the University of Toulouse-Jean Jaurès. In 2008-2009 she taught at the Sorbonne Nouvelle University - Paris 3 and from 2005 to 2008 at the University of Paris-Est Marne-la-Vallée. She is also an associate researcher with the IRCAV – Paris III Sorbonne Nouvelle.

Her research focuses mainly on contemporary cinema, the relationship between literature and cinema, the forms of everyday life in cinema and the aesthetics of images.

She has directed several documentary essays.

She co-edited a collective book on the Hungarian filmmaker Béla Tarr.

== Publications ==
=== General books ===
- Corinne Maury (2022). The Sense of Place in Contemporary Cinema. Edinburgh: Edinburgh University Press. p. 245. ISBN 9781399501408.
- Corinne Maury (2018). Du parti pris des lieux dans le cinéma contemporain (Akerman, Alonso, Costa, Dumont, Huillet & Straub, Mograbi, Tarr...) (in French). Paris: Hermann, series "L’esprit du cinéma". p. 266. ISBN 978-2-7056-9529-3.
- Corinne Maury (2014). L'attrait de la pluie. Crisnée: Yellow Now, series "Côté Cinéma / Motifs". p. 89. ISBN 978-2-87340-334-8.
- Corinne Maury (2011). Habiter le monde. Éloge du poétique dans le cinéma du réel. Crisnée: Yellow Now, series "Côté Cinéma". p. 192. ISBN 978-2-87340-275-4.
- Anne Immelé; Corinne Maury (2009). Les Antichambres (Photographs: Anne Immelé & Text: Corinne Maury) (in French). Trézélan: Éditions Filigranes. p. 69. ISBN 978-2-35046-166-3.

=== Scientific editions ===
- 2016: Béla Tarr. De la colère au tourment, under the direction of Corinne Maury and Sylvie Rollet, Crisnée, Editions Yellow Now, Series "Côté Cinéma", 166 pages, 2016
- 2016: Filmer les frontières, under the direction of Corinne Maury and Philippe Ragel, Saint-Denis, Presses Universitaires de Vincennes, series "Esthétiques hors cadre", 208 pages, 2016
- 2016: Raymonde Carasco and Régis Hébraud à l'Œuvre, under the direction of Nicole Brenez and Corinne Maury, Aix-en-Provence, Presses Universitaires de Provence, series "Arts", 212 pages.
- 2022 : Lav Diaz : faire face, under the direction of Corinne Maury and Olivier Zuchuat, Paris, Post Editions, 365 p.

=== Films ===
- 2001: Mah Damba, une griotte en exil, documentary about the griot Mah Damba, co-directed with Olivier Zuchuat (57 min).
- 2000: André de Richaud, l'homme abreuvoir, (experimental video, Super 8 and 16mm - 6 min)
- 1999: Le Saigneur de la Rivière du Haut, (documentary essay – video 13 min.)
- 1998: Gira Amahoro , (documentary essay, video, 13 min.)
