= Batang West Side =

- Official movie poster
- Directed by: Lav Diaz
- Written by: Lav Diaz
- Produced by: Joey Gosiengfiao
- Starring: Yul Servo; Joel Torre; Gloria Diaz; Angel Aquino
- Cinematography: Miguel V. Fabie III
- Edited by: Ron Dale
- Music by: Joey Ayala
- Production companies: JMCN Productions; Hinabing Pangarap Productions
- Release date: December 2001 (Cinemanila)
- Running time: 315 minutes
- Country: Philippines
- Languages: Filipino; Tagalog; English

Batang West Side (also known as West Side Avenue and West Side Kid) is a 2001 Philippine crime film. The film written and directed by Lav Diaz based on his 1997 Palanca Award winning screenplay. Its cast includes Gloria Diaz, Raul Arellano, Joel Torre and Angel Aquino. The film gives an inside look at the life of Filipinos in America. With this murder mystery set against the idea of the American Dream, Filipino director Lav Diaz broke into the worldwide arthouse film market.

== Synopsis ==
One winter night, Hanzel, a Filipino teenager immigrant has been fatally shot on West Side Avenue, New Jersey. Detective Mijares is assigned to investigate the teen's murder. As the investigation continues, he unravels not only the death of Hanzel but also the struggles of Filipino-American community including the destructive effects of methamphetamine on the youth.

== Cast ==
- Yul Servo as Hanzel Harana
- Joel Torre as Juan Mijares
  - Ron Solis as Young Juan Mijares
- Gloria Diaz as Lolita Fordham
- Angel Aquino as Elvira Pareño
- Arthur Acuña as Bartolo
- Ruben Tizon as Lolo Abdon
- Arianne Recto as Dr. Santos
- Michelle Salvador as Dahlia
- Jomar Roldan as Frederick
- Raul Arellano as Dindo
- Ged Merino as Adan
- Joseph Pe as Tong
- Eric Celerio as the Filmmaker Taga Timog
- Malik Walton as Falcon
- Luis Salvador as Gary
- Lisa Deocampo as a Filmmaker's subject
- Gina Alajar as Helena, a Filmmaker's subject
- Ingrid Constantine as Dr. Janetzko
- Mac Alejandre as Hanzel's father
- Linda Mayo as Dolores's mother
- Preston Barnes as Gordon Fordham
- Antonio Tomahawk as Roberto
- Kenneth Karim and Baritt Constantine as "Bum witnesses"
- Goldie Masaoy as Frederick's friend, Goldie
- Mohammed Ibrahim, Ahmed Aly, Kamal Gedalal and Mohammed Gadalla as "Arab witnesses"
- Anna Okeyo as the Blind Woman
- Marjorie Dubreus as the Blind Woman's daughter
- Cristeta Garcia as Mijares's mother in hospital
  - Leonora Villaroman as Mijares's mother in dreams
- Michael Scarpa and John Ransom as Policemen
- Josephine Demangone as a Nurse
- Allan Santos, Bong Manansala and Rusty Fabunan as "Tong's Men"
- Perry Mamaril, Jojo Gajilan, Je de la Cruz, Jason Baquilod, John Ynayan, Ruben Lee and Mon Mappala as "Adan's Men"
- Danny Pagsambugan, Sheila Lina and Katherine Kate Angeles as Massacre victims
- Bantay as Bartolo's dog

== Release ==
Batang West Side was restored in 2015 by the Austrian Film Museum. The restoration was later picked up by Kani Releasing for a North American theatrical release in April 2025 as part of its 25th anniversary. About the re-release, Kani Releasing co-founder Ariel Esteban Cayer added: "Our goal was to make the film more widely available and put it back in the theaters, where the conditions are ideal for it, as it is five hours long. People who love Batang West Side have managed to see it in various ways throughout the years, but I hope giving it an official re-release outside of Austria elevates its profile even more, which is a great honor to work on." Kani later released the film on Blu-ray.

== Accolades ==
The film won several awards at the Urian Honors, including Best Picture, Best Director (Lav Diaz), Best Screenplay (Lav Diaz), Best Cinematography, Best Actor (Joel Torre), Best Supporting Actress (Gloria Diaz), Best Supporting Actor, Best Production Design, Best Sound, and Best Score (Joey Ayala). It won Best Picture at the Singapore International Film Festival and the Belgium Independent Film Festival.

== See also ==
- List of longest films
