= Serafin Geronimo: Ang Kriminal ng baryo Concepcion =

Philippine action film

- Directed by: Lav Diaz
- Written by: Lav Diaz
- Produced by: Ronald Stephen Monteverde; Richard Goldwyn Monteverde
- Starring: Raymond Bagatsing
- Cinematography: Ariel Reyes
- Edited by: Randy Brien
- Music by: Blitz Padua
- Production company: Good Harvest Unlimited
- Distributed by: Good Harvest Unlimited
- Release date: October 21, 1998
- Running time: 122 minutes
- Country: Philippines
- Languages: Filipino; English

Serafin Geronimo: Ang Kriminal ng baryo Concepcion (transl. Serafin Geronimo: The Criminal of Barrio Concepcion) is a 1998 Philippine action crime film written and directed by Lav Diaz in his directorial debut. The film stars Raymond Bagatsing in the title role.

== Cast ==
- Raymond Bagatsing as Serafin Geronimo
- Tonton Gutierrez as Sarge
- Angel Aquino as Elvira Camandero
- Ana Capri as Estella
- Dindi Gallardo as Marietta
- Raymond Keannu as Dionisio
- Richard Joson as Miguel
- Lawrence David as Antonio
- Lorli Villanueva as Bella
- Dessa Quesada as Nitz
- Joe Gruta as Ponso
- Jomar Roldan as Antonio
- Francis Flores as Quintin
- Horacio Mendoza as Ace

== Awards ==
Year	Awards	Category	Recipient	Result	Ref.
1998	22nd Gawad Urian Awards	Best Actor	Raymond Bagatsing	Won	
