= Minsan Pa =

Minsan pa
- Directed by: Jeffrey Jeturian
- Written by: Armando Lao
- Produced by: Joji Alonso
- Starring: Jomari Yllana; Ara Mina; Christian Vasquez
- Cinematography: Larry Manda
- Music by: Arnel de Pano; Lucien Letaba
- Production company: MLR Films
- Release date: November 24, 2004 (Philippines)
- Languages: Tagalog and Japanese with English subtitles

Minsan Pa (One Moment More) is a 2004 Filipino indie drama film directed by Jeffrey Jeturian, and written by Armando Lao. It stars Jomari Yllana, Ara Mina and Christian Vasquez. The film was critically acclaimed and garnered numerous awards in the Philippines. With a soundtrack by Arnel de Pano and Lucien Letaba, the song Minsan itself was performed by Jonathan Badon. The film was produced by lawyer Joji Alonso under the MLR Films studio.

== Synopsis ==
Jerry is a wide-awake tourist guide in Cebu who knows all the angles, and who has supported his divorced mother and younger brother and sister since their musician father deserted the family for a younger woman. Jerry guides tour buses, taking the mostly Japanese tourists boating, golfing and to strip shows. Jerry also acts as a pimp, and even prostitutes himself. As the breadwinner he makes sacrifices for his family but wields control over his siblings and mother in return.

Luna is a young woman who joins one of the tours. She always carries a camera. Her boyfriend, Alex, follows her. While they are on a boat trip Luna lets her camera fall into the sea. Alex proposes to Luna but has an accident that causes him to start losing his vision, and he withdraws the proposal. Luna returns with Jerry to try to recover the camera, which has taken on symbolic value as a store of memories of past happiness. Jerry becomes increasingly attracted to Luna, but his feelings are not reciprocated as he is unable to give except in exchange for some reward. Eventually Luna is able to make both Jerry and Alex recover from their handicaps and become emotionally mature. The camera is recovered from the sea, and the images captured on it end the film.

== Cast ==
- Jomari Yllana as Jerry
- Ara Mina as Luna
- Christian Vasquez as Alex
- Tirso Cruz III as Jeremiah Toledo Jr.
- Rio Locsin as Pacing
- Dimples Romana as Cristy
- Criselda Volks as Minda
- R.U. Miranda as Aning
- Malu Barry as Mama Love
- Dulce as Female Blind Soloist
- Anna Fegi as Piano Bar Singer
- Nico Antonio as Pablo
- Jonathan Badon as Wedding Singer
- Marru Hadraki as Mr. Watanabe
- R.R. Jacob as Matthew
- Natasha Denser as Noemi

== Production ==
The movie was shot by MLR Films in the tourist area of Cebu, including the Argao Church, Kawasan Falls and Moalboal diving sites. It originally was going under the title of Usahay. The two leads, Jomari Yllana and Ara Mina, were a couple in real life, but split up soon after the movie was completed. The resulting gossip helped publicize the movie. The film was Yllana's comeback after an absence of four years from the big screen since Gatas: Sa Dibdib ng Kaaway (2004). which he did in 2000. The film includes underwater scenes shot by Tamara Benitez, who also had a small role as an American backpacker. The budget was reportedly high given that the photography involved complicated underwater and aerial shots, such as the sweeping opening footage taken from a helicopter. Yllana has said that the film was exceptionally difficult to make, and he not only had to learn how to speak Visayan, Japanese, Korean and Spanish in his portrayal of the tour guide, but being naturally adverse to the water, he also had to take a crash course in diving to be able to accomplish some of his dives up to 40 feet (12 m) in the film, amongst dolphins, swordfish and whale sharks. With a soundtrack by Arnel de Pano and Lucien Letaba, the song Minsan itself was performed by Jonathan Badon.

== Reception ==
The film opened commercially in Metro Manila theaters on November 24, and had its premiere night on November 22 at SM Megamalls Cinema 1 and 2. The film was a major critical success in the Philippines, garnering 8 awards and 4 nominations in 2005. The film was originally submitted to be showcased at the Metro Manila Film Festival (MMFF) in December 2004. Minsan Pa won Best Director, Best Motion Picture (Drama), Best Original Screenplay, Best Original Song, Best Performance by an Actress in a Supporting Role (Drama, Musical or Comedy) (Ara Mina) and was nominated for Best Performance by an Actor in a Leading Role (Drama) (Jomari Yllana) at the Golden Screen Awards. It also received awards for Best Film, Best Performance by Male or Female, Adult or Child, Individual or Ensemble in Leading or Supporting Role (Jomari Yllana) and Best Screenplay at the Young Critics Circle Awards. At the Gawad Urian Awards, the film received nominations for Best Actor (Jomari Yllana), Best Music (Lucien Letaba and Arnel de Pano) and Best Supporting Actress (Ara Mina).

The Filipino Reporter cited the film as one of the best Filipino movies of 2004. The Manila Bulletin described the film as a "must-see movie", "a love story with an unusual twist in that the two main characters do not end up with each other", and said "with its tight direction and beautiful cinematography that makes much of Cebu's beautiful tourist spots (such as its famous dive sites in Moalboal), the movie is expected to break attendance records once more like Jeturian did with Bridal Shower that was both a critical and box-office success. Liz Braun of the Toronto Sun said of this movie, "Minsan Pa has all the requisite tears and drama and reconciliation to qualify as melodrama, but there is a lot more going on in the film about relationships in general and the passage of time... Minsan Pa is beautiful to look at, and not just for the cinematography." The Filipino Express said "Ara Mina's role in this Jeffrey Jeturian film actually lies in the borderline of lead and supporting actress. Although she is the leading lady of Jomari Yllana and is, in fact, billed alongside his name, her character is basically secondary to the flow of the story (her first scene, in fact, comes much later in the movie). But whether lead or support, Ara Mina had already proven her worth as an actress in films like Mano Po 2 and Huling Birhen sa Lupa—the two films that had already given her acting trophies in the past. In Minsan Pa, she delivers another fine performance that is worth of more acting awards.
