= Like Stone Lions at the Gateway into Night =

Like Stone Lions at the Gateway into Night (French: Comme des lions de pierre à l'entrée de la nuit) is a 2012 documentary film by Olivier Zuchuat.

== Summary ==
Between 1947 and 1950, more than 80,000 Greek citizens were imprisoned on the isle of Makronisos in reeducation camps created to "fight the spread of communism". Among these exiles were a number of writers and poets, including Yannis Ritsos and Tassos Livaditis. Despite the deprivation and torture, these prisoners succeeded in composing poems that describe their struggle for survival in this world of internment. These texts, some of them buried in the camps, were later found. Like Stone Lions at the Gateway into Night blends these poetic writings with the reeducation propaganda constantly piped through the camps' loudspeakers. Long tracking shots take the view on a trance-like journey through the camp ruins, interrupted along the way by segments from photographic archives. It is a cinematic essay that revives the memory of forgotten ruins and a battle lost.

== Festivals ==
- Visions du réel - NYON 2012 (International Competition)
- DOK Leipzig 2012 (International Competition)
