= Melba Padilla Maggay =

Filipina writer and social anthropologist

Melba Padilla Maggay (born 1951) is a Filipina writer, social anthropologist, and social activist best known for her academic work and books on culture, social change and development issues, and as the founder of the Institute for Studies in Asian Church and Culture (ISACC).

== Early life and education ==
Maggay was the ninth child, with a mother of Spanish-Filipino mestizo background and father of Cavite origins. She completed her A.B. in Mass Communication from the University of Philippines in 1972, a few months before Ferdinand Marcos declared Martial Law. She later completed a M.A. in English Literature and a PhD in Philippine Studies at the University of Philippines. During her university education, she was strongly shaped by InterVarsity Christian Fellowship (IVCF), later establishing the ISACC as a kind of daughter organization of IVCF.

== Ministry and social activism ==
=== Evangelism and social activism ===
Maggay is known for her work as a social activist, advocating for evangelicalism to have an integral mission, that brings together evangelism and social activism.

In 1978, Maggay co-founded the Institute for Studies in Asian Church and Culture (ISACC) in response to the crisis posed by the dictatorship of Ferdinand Marcos.

=== During the 1986 People Power Revolution ===
Dr. Maggay's Institute for Studies in Asian Church and Culture (ISACC) and Dr. Isabelo Magalit's congregation at the Diliman Bible Church (DBC) were the main groups that came together to form Konsensiya ng Febrero Siete (KONFES) and participate in the EDSA People Power Revolution of 1986. It was one of the early groups to man the barricades at Gate 2 of Camp Aguinaldo, which the Marcos military had identified as an entry point for storming the camp. In doing so, Maggay and Magalit joined the People Power Revolution earlier than other churches and organizations such as the Philippine Council of Evangelical Churches.

== Works ==
- Maggay, Melba Padilla (1987). The Gospel in Filipino Context. OMF Literature. ISBN 978-971-511-105-8.
- Maggay, Melba Padilla (1999). Filipino Religious Consciousness: Some Implications to Missions. PhilAm Books. ISBN 978-971-8743-07-2.
- Maggay, Melba Padilla (2011). Transforming Society. Wipf and Stock Publishers. ISBN 978-1-7252-2922-8.
- Maggay, Melba Padilla (2017). Global Kingdom, Global People: Living Faithfully in a Multicultural World. Langham Publishing. ISBN 978-1-78368-199-0.
