= Raymond Bagatsing =

Filipino actor

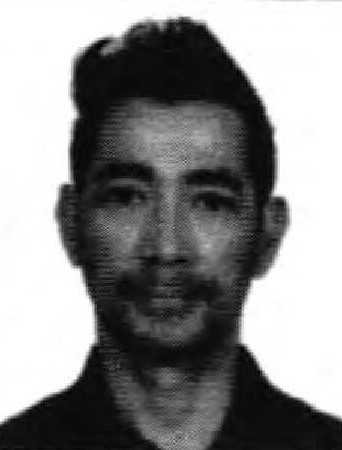
- Bagatsing's certificate of candidacy photo in 2024
- Born: Ramon JR San Diego Bagatsing III; September 15, 1967 (age 59); Tondo, Manila, Philippines
- Occupations: Actor, model
- Years active: 1990–present
- Height: 5 ft 10 in (178 cm)
- Political party: PFP (since 2024)
- Other political affiliations: KBL (2021–2024)
- Spouses: Lara Fabregas (m. 2001–2002) Cora Pastrana (m. 2008–2009)
- Relatives: Ramon Bagatsing (grandfather); RK Bagatsing (brother)

Ramon JR San Diego Bagatsing III, known professionally as Raymond Bagatsing (born 15 September 1967), is a Filipino actor. Having jumpstarted his acting career in the early 1990s, he is most notable for the roles of Jaime Laurel in the hit ABS-CBN series Pusong Ligaw, and Edgardo Magallanes in the GMA action-drama series Black Rider.

== Early life ==
Raymond is the grandson of Ramon D. Bagatsing, Sr., a former Mayor of Manila. His parents are actor Ramon "Boy" B. Bagatsing， Jr. and Marilou San Diego-Bagatsing. His mother hails from Santa Rosa, Nueva Ecija, where Bagatsing spent part of his childhood and grew up exposed to local provincial life and traditional beliefs.

He is the older brother of actress Monina Bagatsing and actor Ramon Khino "RK" Bagatsing.

== Acting career ==
Throughout the 1990s, he starred in several action movies, notably Buenaventura Daang: Bad Boys Gang and Bastardo. He was part of the long-time drama series Mula sa Puso from 1997 to 1999. Since then, he starred in some drama series. In 2019, Bagatsing portrayed Manuel L. Quezon in Quezon's Game. He also played corrupt governor Arturo "Art" Alcantara in an iWant digital series Bagman with Arjo Atayde.

== Political career ==
=== Vice mayoralty bid ===
Bagatsing ran for vice mayor of Manila in 2022 under Kilusang Bagong Lipunan with former Mayor Mel Lopez's son Alex (of Partido Federal ng Pilipinas) as his running mate. However, he lost to Manila's 3rd district representative Yul Servo Nieto.

=== Mayoralty bid ===
Bagatsing filed his candidacy for mayor of Manila in 2025 under Partido Federal ng Pilipinas, but later lost to former Mayor Isko Moreno, placing fourth.

== Filmography ==
=== Film ===
Year	Title	Role
1990	Sgt. Clarin: Bala para sa Ulo Mo	
1990	Kahit Singko Ay Di Ko Babayaran ang Buhay Mo	
1992	Tondo: Libingan ng Mga Siga	Bombay
1993	Tikboy Tikas at Mga Khroaks Boys	Khroaks Member
1993	Buenaventura Daang: Bad Boys Gang	Buenaventura Daang
1994	Silang Matatapang Walang Atras sa Laban	
1995	Tagos sa Laman	
1995	Nena	Caloy
1995	Hatulan: Bilibid Boys 2	
1995	Dog Tag	Eric
1995	Delinkwente	Rodel
1996	SPO4 Santiago	Boy's men
1996	Sgt. Pantaleon	Sgt. Marcelino Pantaleon
1996	Sa Bingit Ng Kamatayan	
1996	Kara Kaakit-akit	Armand
1996	Room for Rent	Johnny
1997	Goodbye America	Jess Santiago
1997	Milagros	Benneth
1997	Halik ng Bampira	
1997	Bastardo	Leonardo "Leo" Cuevas
1998	April, May, June	Rupert
1998	Marahas: Walang Kilalang Batas	Atty. Russell Miranda
1998	Bata, Bata... Pa'no Ka Ginawa?	Johnny Deogracias
1998	Serafin Geronimo: Ang Kriminal ng Baryo Concepcion	Serafin Geronimo
1998	Kung Tawagin Sila Ay Sexy	
1999	Bayad Puri	
1999	Burlesk King	Mario
1999	Ms. Kristina Moran: Babaeng Palaban	
1999	Ibibigay Ko ang Lahat	Mark
1999	Soltera	Dr. Jojo Morales
1999	Ekis: Walang Tatakas	Roger
1999	Suspek	Ric Valiente
1999	Malikot na Mundo	
2000	Sugo ng Tondo	Lambert
2001	Tabi Tabi Po!	Priest
2001	Ooops, Teka Lang... Diskarte Ko 'To!	Ronnie
2001	Buhay Kamao	Edwin
2001	Kamo	Benici
2001	Sisid	Nonoy
2001	Marital Rape	Brian
2001	Huwag Kang Kikibo	Dimas
2001	Tatarin	Entoy
2001	Di Kita Ma-reach	Rufo
2001	Kung Mawawala Ka	Alberto Montemayor
2002	Hunger Strike	
2003	Sukdulan	Miguel
2003	Sanib	
2003	Crying Ladies	Ipe
2003	Filipinas	Ramesh
2013	The Guerrilla Is a Poet	Major Miguel Aure
2014	Mumbai Love	Rashid
2014	The Janitor	
2015	Of Sinners and Saints	Father Carlos
2015	Felix Manalo	Carling
2015	Dahling Nick	Nick Joaquin
2016	1898, Our Last Men in the Philippines	Cdr. Teodoro Luna
2017	Corpus Delicti	Bert Corpuz
2017	AWOL	
2018	Quezon's Game	Manuel L. Quezon
2019	Hellcome Home	Nandy Domingo
2021	Nelia	Dr. Rey

=== Television series ===
Year	Title	Role
1996	Bayani	Dagohoy
1997–1999	Mula sa Puso	Nardo
1999–2001	Marinella	Leo Rodríguez / Jake Arcellana-Rodríguez
1999–2000	Liwanag ng Hatinggabi	
1999–2001	Kirara, Ano ang Kulay ng Pag-ibig?	Miguel
2000	Maalaala Mo Kaya: Wedding Cake	Himself
2002–2003	Kung Mawawala Ka	Alberto Montemayor
2003–2004	Narito ang Puso Ko	Joaquin San Victores
2005	Saang Sulok ng Langit	Vergel
2005–2006	Etheria: Ang Ikalimang Kaharian ng Encantadia	Emre
2006–2009	Komiks Presents: Agua Bendita	Dr. Rodrigo Cristi
2006	Encantadia: Pag-ibig Hanggang Wakas	Emre
2007	Maalaala Mo Kaya: Sigarilyo	Albert
2010–2011	Sabel	Jimmy Sandoval
2011	Time of My Life	Fred
2011–2012	Amaya	Datu Bugna
2012	The Good Daughter	Rico Guevarra
2012	One True Love	Carlos Samonte
2012–2013	Temptation of Wife	Romeo Salcedo
2013	Magpakailanman: Sinunog ng Bahay	Dario
2013	Mga Basang Sisiw	Froilan Santos
2013	Genesis	Oliver Romualdez
2014	Carmela: Ang Pinakamagandang Babae sa Mundong Ibabaw	Dante Hernando
2014	Magpakailanman: Persia: Asong Kanal	Doc Leo
2014	Magpakailanman: Tatay Na si Totoy, Nanay Na si Nene	Mando
2014	Strawberry Lane	Hector Rosales
2015	Baker King	President Johnny Lee
2016	Ipaglaban Mo!: Lason	Narsing
2017	Maalaala Mo Kaya: Gatas	Roy
2017–2018	Pusong Ligaw	Jaime Laurel
2018	Bagani	Bathala
2018	Precious Hearts Romances Presents: Araw Gabi	Virgilio De Alegre
2019	TODA One I Love	Jessie Magsino
2019	Maalaala Mo Kaya: Kadena	Genaro
2020	Maalaala Mo Kaya: Mata	Wilfred
2020	A Soldier's Heart	Col. Melicio Adriano
2020	Almost Paradise	Cesar Rabara
2020–2022	La Vida Lena	Lukas Narciso
2021	Tadhana: Daddy's Girl	Kiko
2022	FPJ's Ang Probinsyano	Lucio "Supremo" Santanar
2022	Tadhana: Baliw na Puso	Dennis
2023–2024	Good Will	Atty. Joe Ferrer
2023–2024	Black Rider	Edgardo "Señor" Magallanes / Carlos Legaspi
2025	Incognito	Amb. Jigme Rai
2025–2026	Roja	Magnus Roja
2026	Magpakailanman: Amo ko, Mahal ko	Wilmar

=== Television shows ===
Year	Title	Host/Guest
2003–04	Nginiiig!	Host
2006	Ripley's Believe It or Not! Philippine Edition	Host
2021	Magandang Buhay	Guest

=== Web series ===
Year	Title	Role
2019–	Bagman	Arturo Alcantara

== Awards and nominations ==
Year	Award-giving body	Category	Work	Result	Ref.
1998	21st Gawad Urian Awards	Best Actor (Pinakamahusay Na Pangunahing Aktor)	Milagros	Won	
1999	22nd Gawad Urian Awards	Best Actor (Pinakamahusay Na Pangunahing Aktor)	Serafin Geronimo: Ang Kriminal ng Baryo Concepcion	Won	
2000	18th FAP Awards	Best Supporting Actor	Soltera	Won	
2000	49th FAMAS Award	Best Supporting Actor	Soltera	Won	
2001	6th Asian Television Awards	Best Actor in a Leading Role	Maalaala Mo Kaya: "Wedding Ring"	Won	
2004	1st Golden Screen TV Awards	Best Supporting Actor in a Drama Series	Narito ang Puso Ko	Won	
2012	35th Gawad Urian Awards	Best Actor (Pinakamahusay Na Pangunahing Aktor)	Boundary	Nominated	
2018	Cinema World Fest Awards	Award of Excellence for Actor	Quezon's Game	Won	
2020	7th Urduja Heritage Film Awards	Best Actor	Quezon's Game	Won	

Awards
Preceded by Tonton Gutierrez	Gawad Urian for Best Actor; 1998, 1999	Succeeded by Ricky Davao
Party political offices
Vacant	Kilusang Bagong Lipunan nominee for Vice Mayor of Manila; 2022	Succeeded by Remedios Oyaldes
Preceded by Alex Lopez	Partido Federal ng Pilipinas nominee for Mayor of Manila; 2025	Most recent
