= Olivier Zuchuat =

Swiss film director (born 1969)

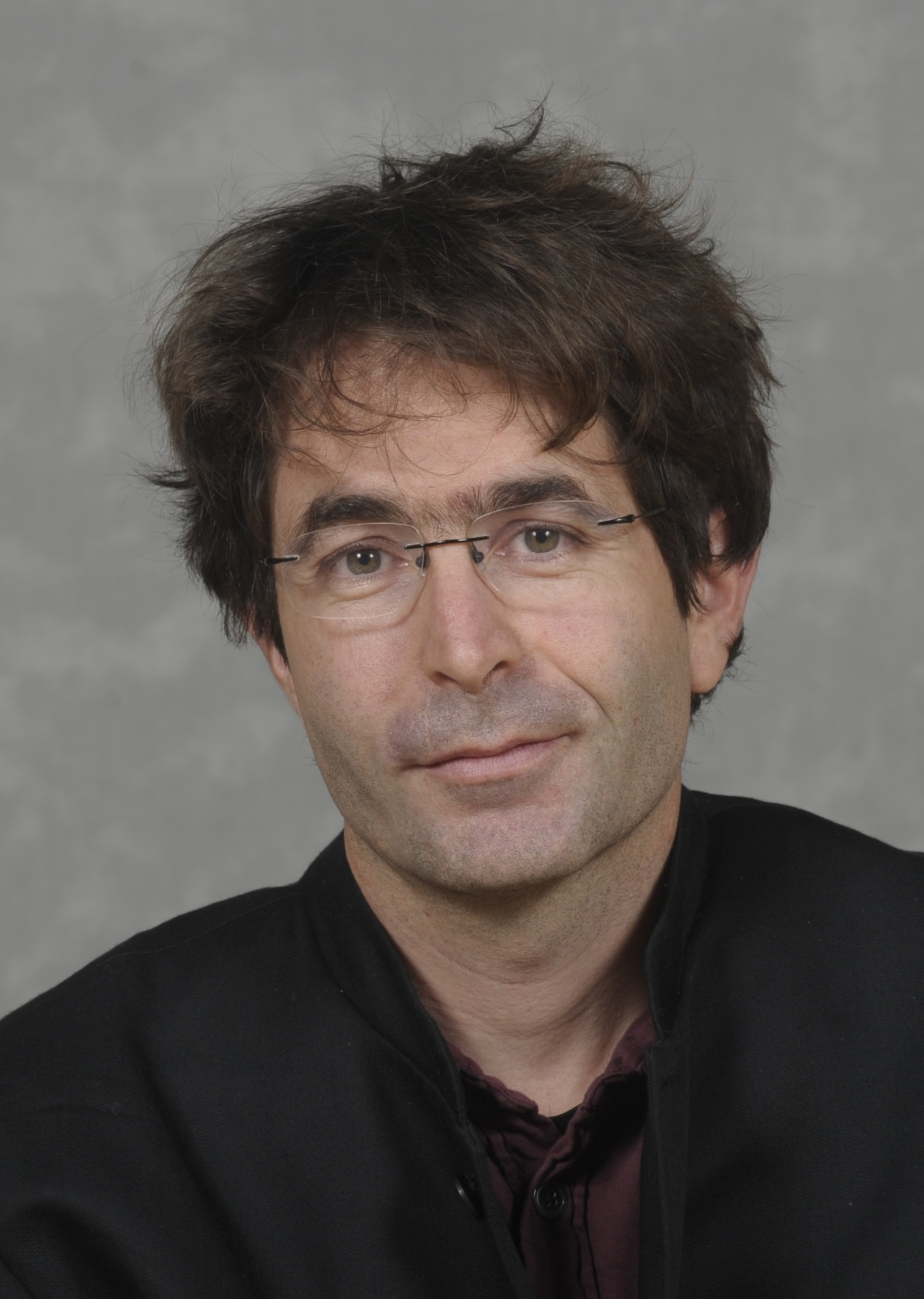
- Born: 1969 (age 56–57); Geneva, Switzerland
- Education: Trinity College Dublin; École Polytechnique Fédérale de Lausanne (BA); Université de Lausanne (BSc); University of Paris 8 (PhD)
- Occupation: Film director
- Scientific career
- Institutions: Geneva University of Art and Design
- Thesis: Esthétiques de montage contemporaines. Attrait de la durée et dyslinéarités
- Doctoral advisor: Christa Blümlinger

Olivier Zuchuat (born 1969) is a Swiss film director.

Zuchuat was born in 1969 in Geneva. After studying theoretical physics at EPFL and Trinity College and literature he became a teaching assistant at the University of Lausanne (Switzerland). He directed several theatrical productions of works by Bertolt Brecht and Heiner Müller and also worked as assistant with the German theater director Matthias Langhoff (Théâtre Nanterre-Amandiers). Since 2001, he dedicates himself mainly with cinema as an editor or a film director. Since 2006, he has been teaching film studies at the Université de Paris-Est Marne la Vallée and at La Fémis (French: École Nationale Supérieure des Métiers de l'Image et du Son – Paris". He received his PhD in Film studies at University of Paris 8 with his thesis titled "Esthétiques de montage contemporaines : attrait de la durée et dyslinéarités". Since 2015, he is professor at the cinema department of Geneva University of Art and Design.

== Filmography ==
- 2020: The Perimeter of Kamsé (93 minutes, DCP).
- 2012: Like Stone lions at the gateway into night (86 minutes, DCP)
- 2008: Far from the villages (75 minutes, 35mm), documentary film on a refugees camp in Chad Darfur
- 2005: Djourou, a rope round your neck (63 minutes), documentary film on the debt crisis in Mali
- 2001: Mah Damba, une griotte en exil (57 minutes), documentary film on the singer Mah Damba, co-directed with Corinne Maury

== Awards ==
- Best documentary "Regard sur le monde" – Festival Vues d’Afriques, Montréal 2005
- Médiathèques Award, FIDMarseille 2008
- Quartz 2009 – Swiss Cinema Award, Nomination for best documentary film
- International Film Festival Innsbruck 2009 – Best Documentary
- Nuremberg International Human Rights Film Award 2009 – Nomination
- DOK Leipzig 2013 – Oecumenical Jury Award (International Competition)
- Festival International du Film Méditerranéen de Tétouan 2013 – Jury Award
- Festival International du film Insulaire (Groix 2014) – Jury Award (special mention)

=== Publications ===
- Bertrand Bacqué, Lucrezia Lippi, Serge Margel, Olivier Zuchuat (eds.), Montage, une anthologie (1913–2018), Genève-Dijon, Les Presses du réel – MAMCO, co-édition avec HEAD (Geneva University of Art and Design), 2018, 576 p.
- Corinne Maury, Olivier Zuchuat (eds.), Lav Diaz : faire face, Paris, Post Editions, 2022, 365 p.
