= Gloria Diaz =

Filipino actress and model

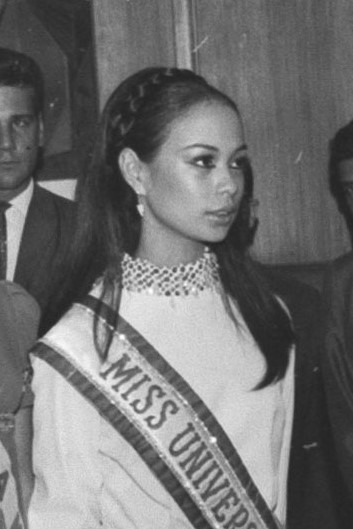
- Diaz in 1969
- Born: Gloria Maria Aspillera Diaz; April 5, 1951 (age 75); Manila, Philippines
- Education: St. Scholastica's College, Manila (BBA)
- Occupation: Actress
- Height: 5 ft 5 in (165 cm)
- Spouse: Gabriel "Bong" Daza III (m. 1986; sep. 1995)
- Partner: Mike de Jesus
- Children: 3, including Isabelle Daza
- Relatives: Georgina Wilson (niece)
- Beauty pageant titleholder
- Title: Binibining Pilipinas Universe 1969; Miss Universe 1969
- Years active: 1969–present
- Hair color: Dark brown
- Eye color: Brown
- Major competitions: Binibining Pilipinas 1969; (Winner – Binibining Pilipinas Universe 1969); Miss Universe 1969; (Winner); (10 Best in Swimsuit)

Gloria Maria Aspillera Diaz (Tagalog: [ˈɡloɾja ˈdɪas]; born April 5, 1951) is a Filipino actress, model, socialite, and beauty queen who won Miss Universe 1969, making history as the first Filipino Miss Universe. Her acting accolades include 3 FAMAS Awards.

== Early life and family ==
Diaz is one of 12 children of lawyer Jaime Diaz and model and socialite Teresa Aspillera. Her sister, Rio Díaz, was also an actress and beauty queen.

== Pageantry ==
Aged 18, while studying at the St. Scholastica's College in Manila, Díaz entered and won Binibining Pilipinas 1969.

Díaz then entered and won Miss Universe 1969, at Miami Beach, Florida, U.S. on July 19, 1969. In the final question round, her answer to the question regarding "men in the moon" charmed the audience and the judges. She was the first Filipina to win the Miss Universe crown. News of her victory (and her measurements) were communicated to the Apollo 11 crew members during their space mission.

During her reign, Díaz travelled through several countries to promote the advocacies supported by the Miss Universe Organization as well as appeared in many public and television events in the United States.

== Acting career ==
=== Beginnings ===
Shortly after her reign as Miss Universe, she pursued an acting career in the Philippines, and in 1975, she was cast in her breakthrough performance as Isabel in the critically acclaimed Ang Pinakamagandang Hayop sa Balat ng Lupa. Her performance in the film was met with praise by film critics and was considered one of the most promising breakthroughs of any actress in Philippine cinema. Later that year, she was nominated for a FAMAS Award for Best Performance by an Actress in a Lead Role.

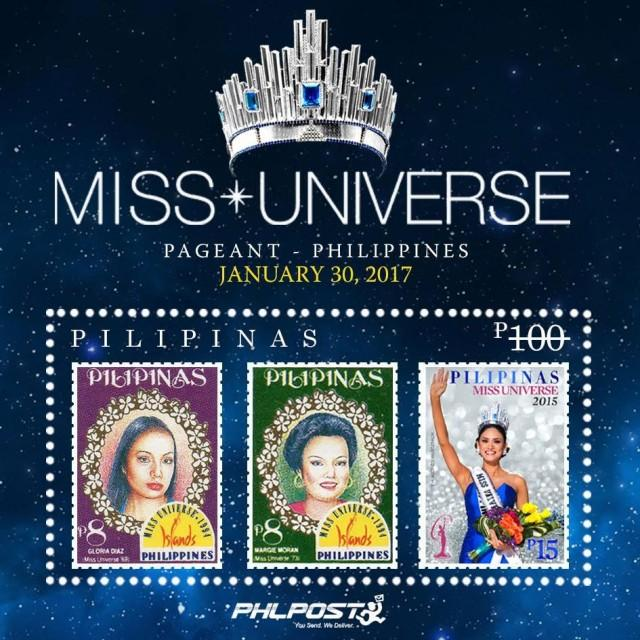
Commemorative stamps featuring the first three Filipino winners of the Miss Universe pageant (Diaz, left)

Díaz continued acting in film for many years before trying out starring in television. It was in 1996 when she first appeared in the drama series Anna Karenina. She garnered popularity after appearing in the sitcom Kool Ka Lang on GMA Network in 1998. That same year, she appeared in the biopic film Jose Rizal where she played Rizal's mother Dona Teodora Alonso. Her portrayal of Rizal's mother won a Best Supporting Actress award at the 1998 Metro Manila Film Festival.

In 2006, Díaz was cast in the psychological thriller Nasaan Ka Man alongside award-winning actress Hilda Koronel, Claudine Barretto, Diether Ocampo and Jericho Rosales. For her role as Lilia, a woman trying to suppress her distraught as she tries to keep her family together, Díaz was once again nominated and eventually awarded as FAMAS Best Supporting Actress.

In 2009, she once again won a FAMAS Award for Best Supporting Actress for her role in the highly acclaimed film Sagrada Familia.

In 2010, she starred in two GMA projects, Beauty Queen and Diva. She returned to GMA for Mistaken Identity after a brief stint in 100 Days to Heaven.

In 2011, she played a supporting role in her first TV5 project, Glamorosa, as Dra. Claudia Montesilva-Herrera.

=== Recent works ===
Díaz in 2026

From 2012 to 2018, Díaz appeared in several ABS-CBN television dramas including Kung Ako'y Iiwan Mo, May Isang Pangarap, Mirabella, Dream Dad and had roles in MMK and an appearance in Ipaglaban Mo. She returned to GMA again in 2018 to play an evil mother role on Pamilya Roces. She also appeared in the comedy films Sisterakas and Kung Fu Divas.

In 2019, Díaz returned to ABS-CBN and was recently cast in the afternoon drama series Los Bastardos where she portrayed the role of Soledad Cardinal, the long-lost wife of Don Roman Cardinal (Ronaldo Valdez), and Consuelo Cuevas, the mother of Lorenzo Cuevas (Joseph Marco). She also appeared as a fictional version of herself in the second season of the Netflix series Insatiable with Dallas Roberts and Debby Ryan.

In 2020, Díaz returned to TV5 to play the role of Belinda "Tyang Bella" Vasquez on Oh My Dad!.

In 2022, Díaz returned to ABS-CBN to play the role of Helena "Helena Agcaoili-Wilson" on 2 Good 2 Be True. Via Kapamilya Channel And A2Z

In 2023, Díaz was a guest judge In Drag Race Philippines on HBO Go And WOW Presents Plus

== Personal life ==
Diaz married businessman and heir Gabriel Daza III in 1986, and had three children, including Isabelle Daza. They separated in 1995, and she has since been in a relationship with Michael Osmeña de Jesus, a Filipino banker.

In 2010, the Cebu chapter of the Vice Mayors League declared Gloria Diaz persona non grata after her Miss Universe comments on Cebuano models.

Through her sister, Diaz is an aunt of model and socialite Georgina Wilson.

== Filmography ==
=== Film ===
Year	Title	Role
1974	Ang Pinakamagandang Hayop sa Balat ng Lupa	Isabel
1974	Amor	Amor
1975	Ang Nobya Kong Sexy	
1975	An Affair in Tahiti	
1975	Sa Pag-ikot ng Mundo	
1975	Balakyot	
1975	Sa Ibabaw ng Lahat	
1975	Diligin Mo ng Hamog ang Uhaw Na Lupa	
1976	Pugad ng Agila	
1976	Brutus	
1976	Putik Ka Man... Sa Alabok Magbabalik	
1976	Andalucia	Dolores
1976	Ganito Kami Noon... Paano Kayo Ngayon?	Diding
1977	Wanakosey	
1977	Babae!	
1977	Sinong Kapiling? Sinong Kasiping?	
1977	Namangka sa Dalawang Ilog	
1977	Bawal: For Men Only	
1977	Babae... Ngayon at Kailanman	
1978	Ibalik Mo ang Araw sa Mundong Makasalanan	
1979	Ikaw ang Miss Universe Nang Buhay Ko	
1980	Andres de Saya	Matilde
1980	Wild Animals	
1981	Uhaw Na Dagat	Magda
1982	Five and the Skin	
1982	Andres de Saya (Mabagsik Na Daw)	Matilde
1983	Palabra de Honor	Victoria
1983	Macho-nurin	
1983	Hayop sa Ganda	
1983	Nagalit ang Buwan sa Haba ng Gabi	Stella de Joya
1983	Karibal Ko ang Aking Ina	
1983	Minsan Isang Tag-init	
1984	Hawakan Mo at Pigilan ang Kahapon	
1984	May Lamok sa Loob ng Kulambo	Ellen Rivas
1984	May Daga sa Labas ng Lungga	Ellen Rivas
1985	Lalakwe	Bea Vergo
1985	Goat Buster sa Templo ni Dune	Jane
1985	Sa Totoo Lang!	Amy
1985	Momooo	
1985	Menudo at Pandesal	
1986	Anomalya ni Andres de Saya Part III	Matilde
1986	Mga Anghel ng Diyos	
1986	Ang Daigdig Ay Isang Butil Na Luha	
1987	Working Girls 2	Gabriela
1988	Sa Likod ng Kasalanan	
1989	My Pretty Baby	Chiara/Biata
1990	Sagot ng Puso	
1990	Love at First Sight	
1990	Mga Birhen ng Ermita	
1990	Island of Desire	
1990	Trese	
1991	My Pretty Baby	
1991	Ang Utol Kong Hoodlum	Dexter
1992	Miss Na Miss Kita (Utol Kong Hoodlum II)	Dexter
1993	Maj. Napoleon Velasco: Kumander Kalbo	
1993	Abel Morado, Ikaw ang Maysala	
1993	Dalawa Laban sa Mundo: Ang Siga at ang Beauty	Gladys' mother
1994	Alyas Boy Ama: Tirador	
1996	Dyesebel	Banak
1997	Reputasyon	
1997	Kirot sa Puso	
1998	Miguel/Michelle	Tinang
1998	José Rizal	Teodora Alonzo
1999	Dahil May Isang Ikaw	Nanay Ruby
2000	Bob, Verushka and the Pursuit of Happiness	Botanica Vendor
2001	Bakit 'Di Totohanin	Isabel
2002	Milagro's Calling	Milagro
2002	Batang West Side	Lolita Fordham
2003	Nympha	Nana Issa
2003	Captain Barbell	Cielo's mom
2004	So Happy Together	Daisy
2005	Nasaan Ka Man	Lilia
2006	Kasal, Kasali, Kasalo	Charito
2007	Sakal, Sakali, Saklolo	Charito
2008	Ang Tanging Ina N'yong Lahat	Pres. Hillary Dafalong
2012	The Mommy Returns	Mabel
2012	Sisterakas	Maria Laurel
2013	Kung Fu Divas	Charlotte's adoptive mother
2017	Si Chedeng at si Apple	
2019	Unbreakable	Helen Saavedra
2023	Mallari	Doña Facunda Mallari
2025	Rekonek	Cory

=== Television ===
Year	Title	Role
1969	Miss Universe 1969	Herself / Contestant / Winner
1970	Miss Universe 1970	Herself / Reigning Miss Universe
1974	Miss Universe 1974	Herself
1991	Maalaala Mo Kaya: Punyal	
1995	Kapag May Katwiran... Ipaglaban Mo!: "Ang Kay Pedro'y kay Pedro"	
1996–2002	Anna Karenina	
1998–2003	Kool Ka Lang	Nadia
2002–2003	Kung Mawawala Ka	Czarina Montemayor
2004	Sarah the Teen Princess	Wendy
2004	Star Circle National Teen Quest	Judge
2007	Sana Maulit Muli	Monica Johnson
2009–2010	Nagsimula sa Puso	Pinky Ortega
2010	Diva	Paula Fernandez
2010–2011	Beauty Queen	Madame Yuri Sandoval
2011	100 Days to Heaven	Dolores Bustamante
2011	Mistaken Identity	Queen Mercedes
2011–2012	Glamorosa	Claudia Montesilva-Herrera
2012	Kung Ako'y Iiwan Mo	Elvie Raymundo
2013	May Isang Pangarap	Olivia Rodriguez
2014	Mirabella	Lucia Magnolia Flores
2014	Maalaala Mo Kaya: Seashells	Adora
2014–2015	Dream Dad	Nenita Viray-Javier
2017	Maalaala Mo Kaya: Salamin	Helen Vela
2017	Maalaala Mo Kaya: Sumbrero	Mommy
2018	Ipaglaban Mo: Daya	Juanita
2018	Dear Uge: Mommy Pasaway	Remedios
2018	Magpakailanman: The Ups and Downs of Snooky Serna	Mila Ocampo
2018	Pamilya Roces	Natalia Austria-Roces
2019	Precious Hearts Romances Presents: Los Bastardos	Soledad de Jesus-Cardinal / Consuelo Cuevas
2019	Insatiable (season 2)	Gloria Reyes
2020	Beauty Queens	Dahlia Rodriguez-De Veyra
2020–2021	Oh My Dad!	Belinda "Tyang Bella" Vasquez
2022	2 Good 2 Be True	Helena Agcaoili-Wilson
2023	Drag Race Philippines	Herself / Guest judge
2025	Walang Matigas na Pulis sa Matinik na Misis	Nadia Hernando
2025	Beauty Empire	Clara Imperial

== Awards and nominations ==
Year	Film/TV Show	Category	Organization	Results
1975	Ang Pinakamagandang Hayop sa Balat ng Lupa	Best Actress	FAMAS Awards	Nominated
1998	Jose Rizal	Best Supporting Actress	Metro Manila Film Festival	Won
1999	Jose Rizal	Best Supporting Actress	FAMAS Awards	Nominated
1999	Miguel/Michelle	Best Actress	FAMAS Awards	Nominated
2002	Batang West Side	Best Supporting Actress	Gawad Urian Awards	Won
2006	Nasaan Ka Man	Best Supporting Actress	Gawad Urian Awards	Nominated
2006	Nasaan Ka Man	Best Supporting Actress	FAMAS Awards	Won
2006	Nasaan Ka Man	Best Performance by Male or Female, Adult or Child, Individual or Ensemble in Leading or Supporting Role	Young Critics Circle	Nominated
2006	Nasaan Ka Man	Movie Supporting Actress of the Year	PMPC Star Awards for Movie	Won
2006	Nasaan Ka Man	Best Performance by an Actress in a Supporting Role (Drama, Musical or Comedy)	Golden Screen Awards for Movies	Nominated
2007	Kasal, Kasali, Kasalo	Best Supporting Actress	Gawad Urian Awards	Nominated
2008	Sakal, Sakali, Saklolo	Movie Supporting Actress of the Year	PMPC Star Awards for Movies	Nominated
2010	Sagrada Familia	Movie Supporting Actress of the Year	PMPC Star Awards for Movies	Won
2010	Sagrada Familia	Best Actress for a Supporting Role	FAMAS Awards	Won
2010	Sagrada Familia	Best Performance by an Actress in a Supporting Role (Drama, Musical or Comedy)	Golden Screen Awards for Movies	Nominated
2024	Mallari	Best Supporting Actress	FAMAS Awards	Won

== Controversy ==
In a TV Patrol interview shortly after the Miss Universe 2010 pageant on August 23, Díaz commented on Binibining Pilipinas contestant Venus Raj becoming 4th runner-up. She suggested in the interview that perhaps Raj and other Philippine representatives would benefit from answering pageant questions via the use of an interpreter rather than in English. Díaz further said that:

"Because when you think about a Cebuana can hardly speak English and of course Tagalog. Maybe she should answer in Bisaya."

Her remark sparked outrage amongst many Cebuanos, who felt that Díaz insulted their English proficiency by championing the controversial issue of Tagalog imperialist culture in the Philippines. Cebuano politicians such as Cebu Governor Gwendolyn Garcia and Congresswoman Rachel del Mar called on her to apologise. In response to the controversy, Díaz declared there was no need to apologize and instead clarified her remarks:

Let me clarify it once and for all. People should have the right to say or to answer (questions) in whatever language they want to say it in. If they're Cebuanos, they can say it in Cebuano. I did not say that they did not speak English. If you're Ilocano, say it in Ilocano. But if you're Ilocano who speaks good English, say it in English. If you're Cebuano who can speak Spanish, if you're comfortable with Spanish, say it in Spanish. That's what I said and that's what I meant.

— Gloria Díaz

On September 1, 2010, the Vice Mayors' League of the Philippines-Cebu passed a resolution declaring Díaz a persona non grata within Cebu City.

== See also ==
- Margie Moran
- Pia Wurtzbach
- Catriona Gray
- Binibining Pilipinas
- Philippines at Major Beauty Pageants

Awards and achievements
Preceded by (Brazil) Martha Vasconcellos	Miss Universe; 1969	Succeeded by (Puerto Rico) Marisol Malaret
Preceded by Charina Zaragoza	Binibining Pilipinas Universe; 1969	Succeeded by Simonette Delos Reyes
