= Santa Ana Heritage Zone =

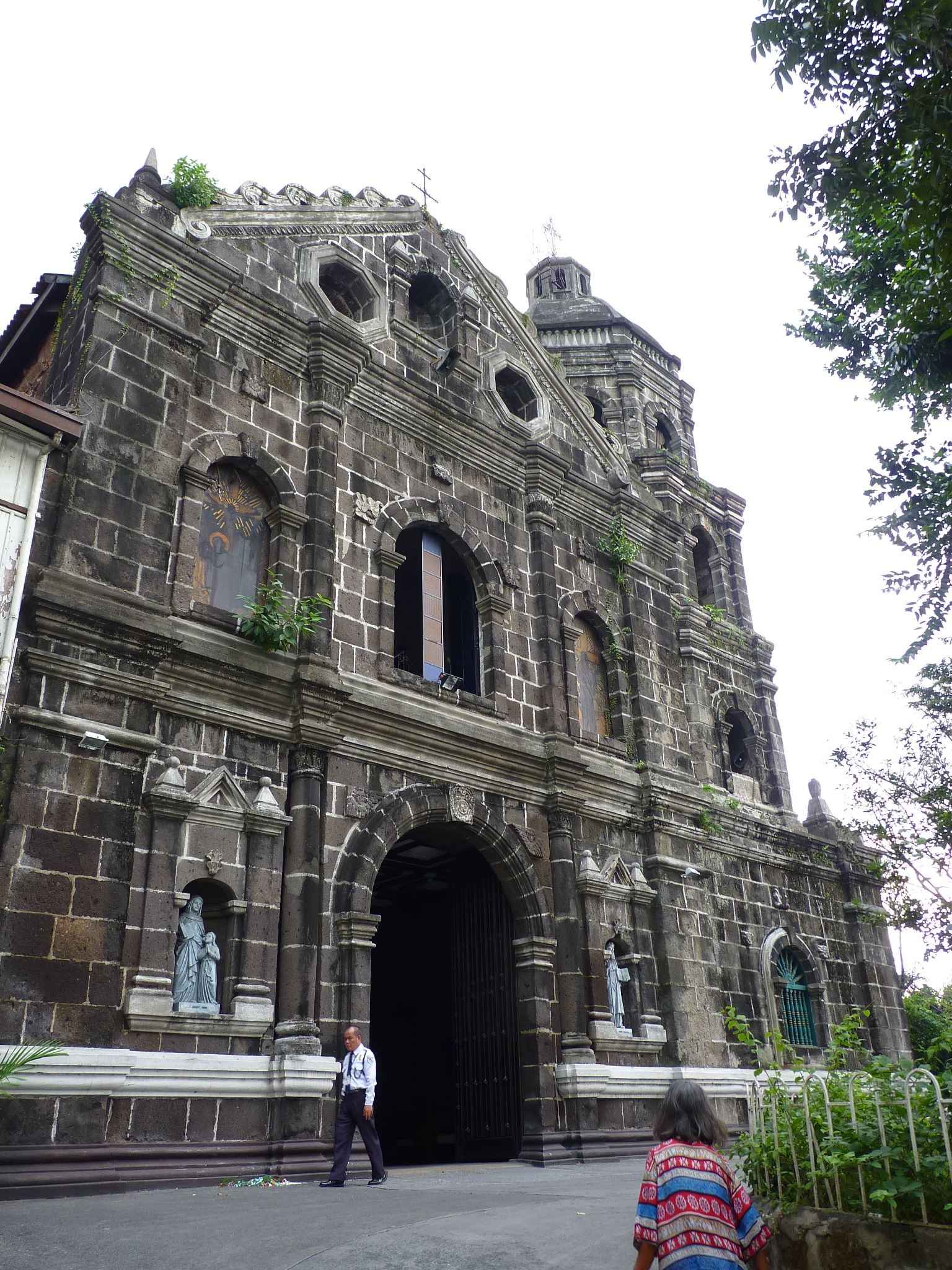
- Facade of the Santa Ana Church

- Location within Metro Manila Location within Philippines
- 14°34′49.1″N 121°0′45.0″E
- Type: Heritage Zone
- Location: Santa Ana, Manila

Site notes
- Governing body: National Historical Commission of the Philippines

The Santa Ana Heritage Zone is a portion of the district of Santa Ana, Manila, Philippines, that was declared a heritage zone in 2014 by the National Historical Commission of the Philippines (NHCP). A larger portion of district was previously declared a histo-cultural heritage/overlay zone by the city government of Manila in 2011.

Among the heritage structures in the zone is the Lichauco Heritage House, a residential building that was declared a heritage house by the National Historical Commission of the Philippines on July 10, 2010, and the Santa Ana Church, which houses two National Cultural Treasures declared by the National Museum of the Philippines: the Camarín de la Virgen, a chapel room located behind the church altar which contains the oldest dateable oil paintings in the country, and the Santa Ana Site Museum, which contains archaeological objects discovered by excavations conducted by the National Museum in 1966.

== Heritage designation ==
Owing to its historic nature and archaeological value, the city council of Manila passed Ordinance no. 8244 on September 22, 2011, declaring a portion of Santa Ana a histo-cultural heritage/overlay zone (O-HCH). This zone is bounded by Philippine National Railways on the north, the Pasig River on the east, Del Pan Street on the south, Tejeron Street on the southwest, and Carreon Street on the west. This declaration by the city government is a requirement for it to be declared a heritage zone by the National Historical Commission of the Philippines.

On May 12, 2014, the Board of the NHCP approved Resolution No. 01, S. 2014, which declared a smaller portion of Santa Ana a heritage zone, under the provisions of Republic Act No. 10066, or the National Cultural Heritage Act. Among the many reasons mentioned by the NHCP in support of its declaration is the historicity of the area as the site where Lakantagkan ruled, the location of Panday Pira's foundry for cannon-making, the Santa Ana Church, and various other structures, including Jesuit retreat houses, a Taoist temple, and a sacred well.

== Issues ==
In 2013, a real estate developer started excavation works for the construction of a residential condominium tower within the histo-cultural heritage/overlay zone. The National Museum claimed that the developer did not perform an Archaeological Impact Assessment (AIA) which is required by the National Cultural Heritage Act while a local heritage group tried to stop the excavation. The site was inspected in 2014 which uncovered damaged pieces of pottery and other artifacts.

== See also ==
- Historic houses in Santa Ana, Manila
