= Cobangbang Ancestral House =

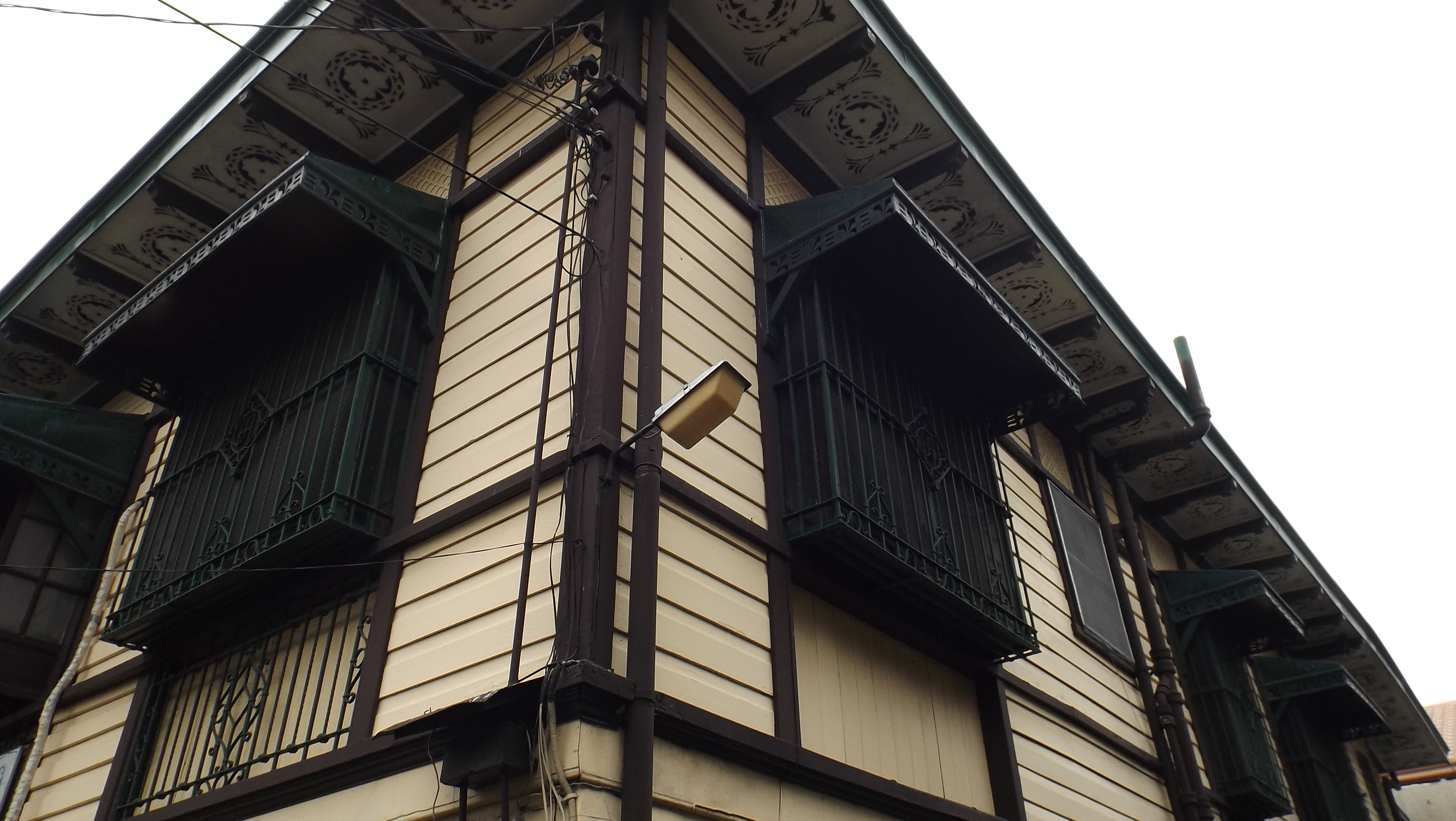
- A two-point view of the house
- Interactive map of the Cobangbang Ancestral House area

General information
- Location: 2289 Syquia Street, Santa Ana, Manila, Philippines
- Coordinates: 14.578721°N 121.009825°E

The Cobangbang Ancestral House is a heritage house in Manila, Philippines built in 1930 by Aurelio Cobangbang. It is located within the heritage zone of Santa Ana, the only district in Manila which was spared from destruction during World War II.

== Architecture ==
The two-storey ancestral house has a mezzanine (entresuelo) on the ground floor. Board panels at the facade of the house were arranged horizontally, while the walls on the lateral part was made of reinforced concrete. Galvanized iron sheets were utilized as main roof and canopies, and eaves have cut-and-pierced metal coffers. Soffits were pierced for ventilation and add a decorative function.

The entrance to the mezzanine is in the right lateral part of the house, at the side of the garage. An antique bed made from Narra tree as well as cabinets made of hardwood can be found inside.

Terrazzo stairs lead to the second level porch. Three steps of the stairs have been buried over time due to road elevation.

The porch has two wooden framed glass swing-out windows facing the street and another at the lateral side. Glass transoms were installed above the windows while metal grills are attached to the walls underneath each window. Ornamental brackets are noticeable on posts at the entrance to the second floor.

Original machuca tiles are laid on the second floor. More antique furnitures and furnishings can be found. One of the most remarkable furniture found inside is the round dining table - made from the root of a Narra tree, and was built the same time the ancestral house was constructed.

Aside from the traditional capiz windows at the left lateral portion of the house, rare patterned glass windows are also displayed. A tracery transom sets the dining area apart from the receiving area.

Since its construction in 1930, no renovations have been made to the house, according to Dr. Amelia Cobangbang, the daughter of Engr. Aurelio Cobangbang.

== Gallery ==
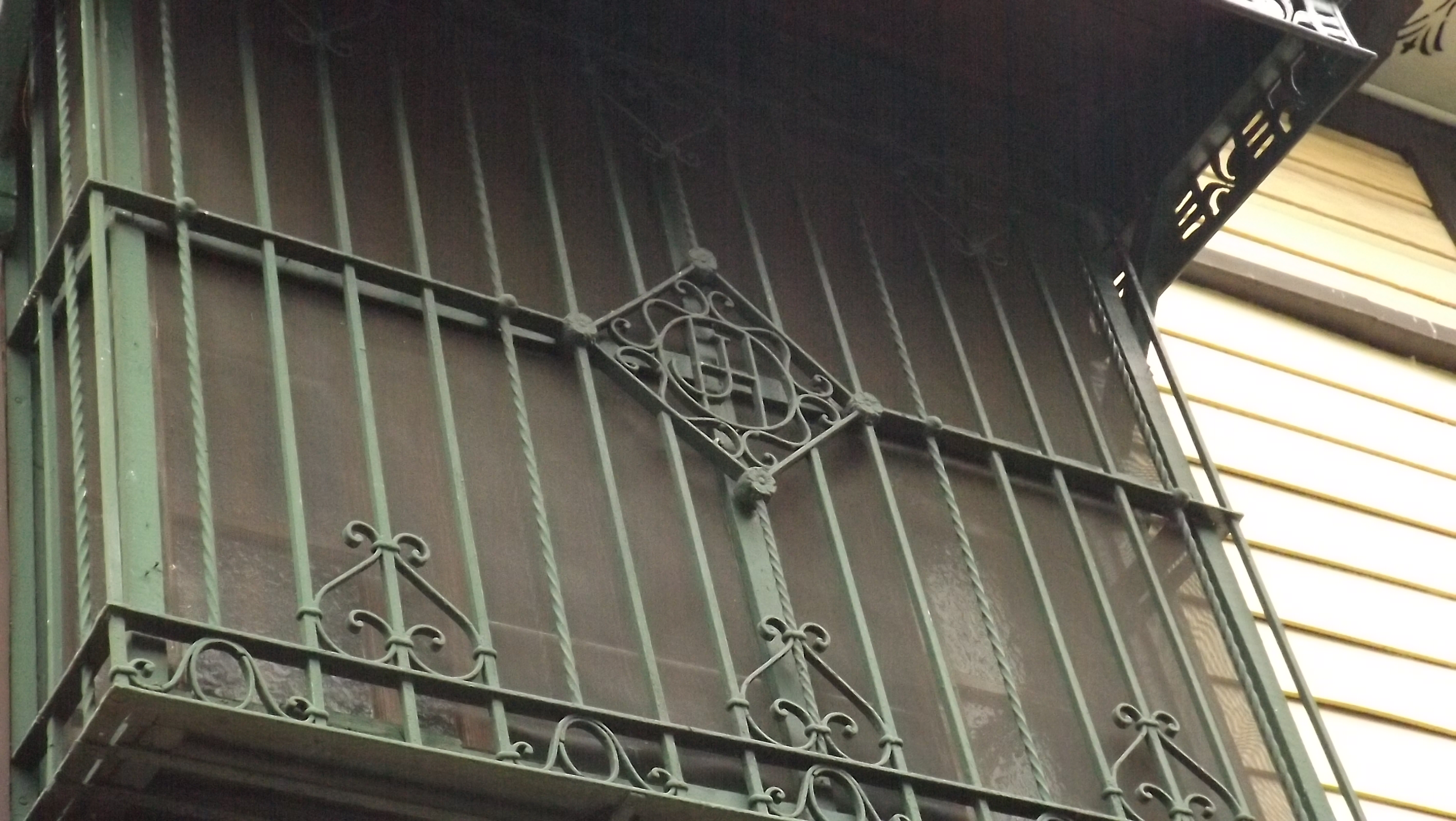
Details of the window grills

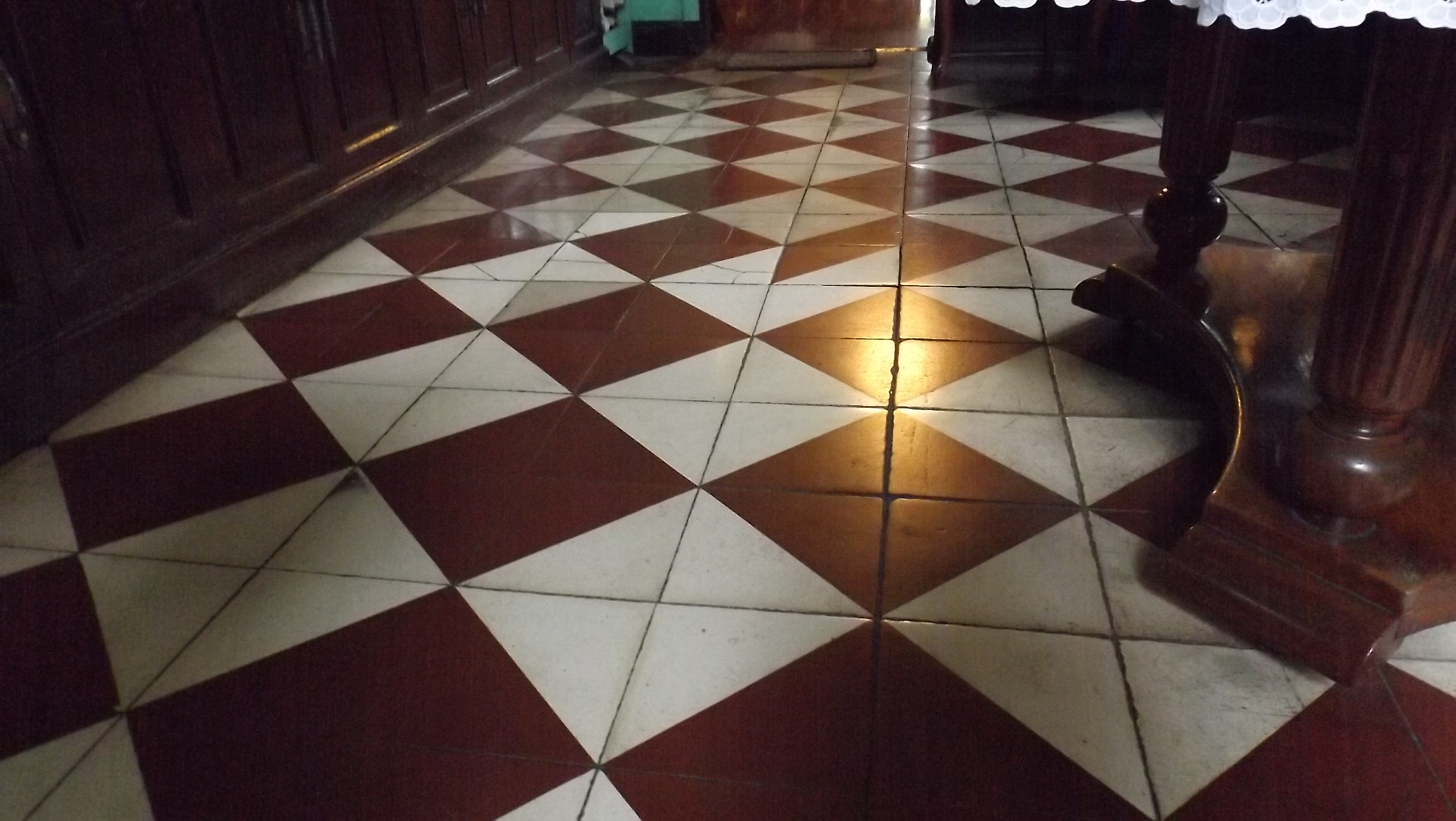
Machuca tiles of the dining area

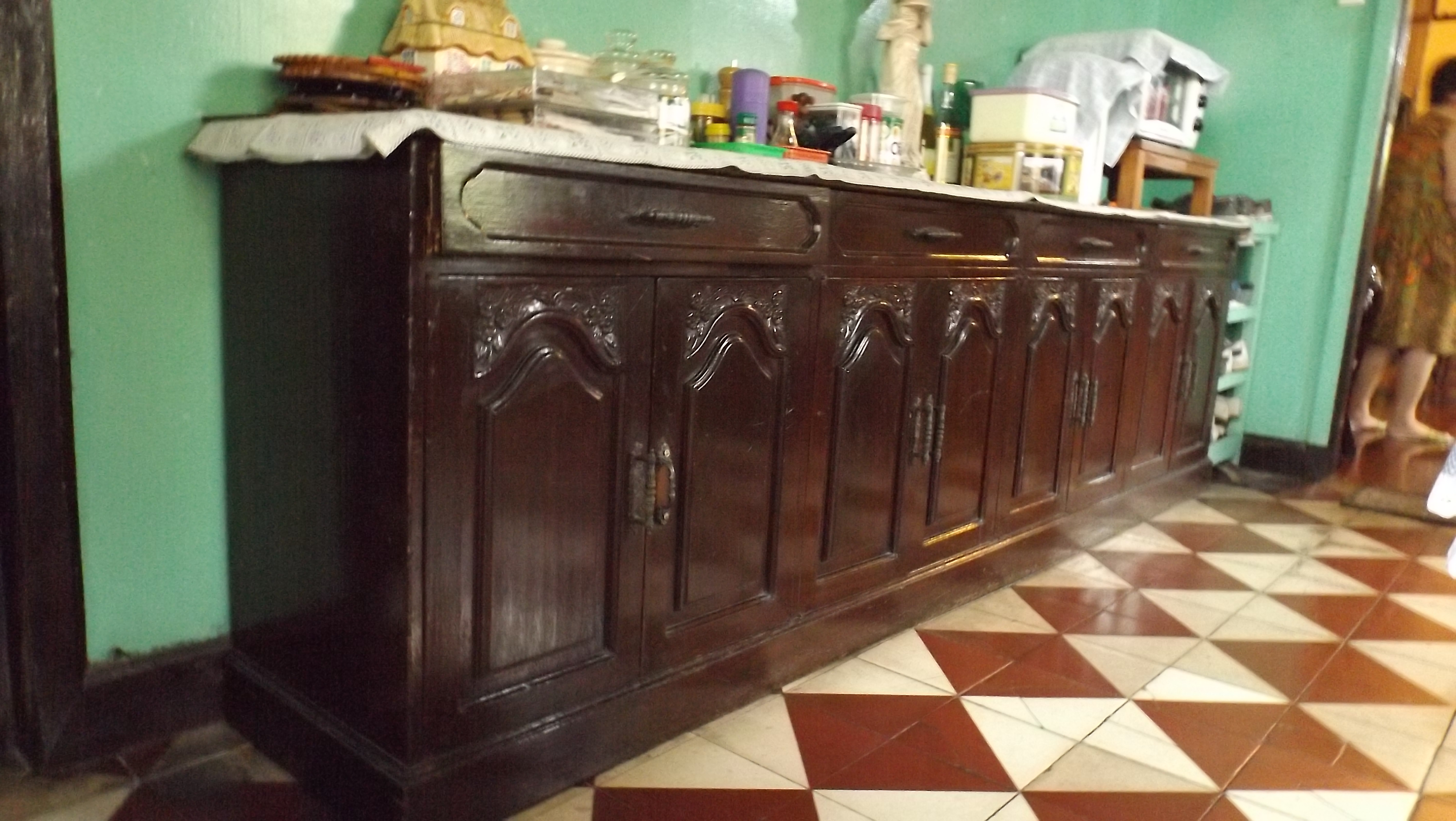
Antique cabinet in the dining area

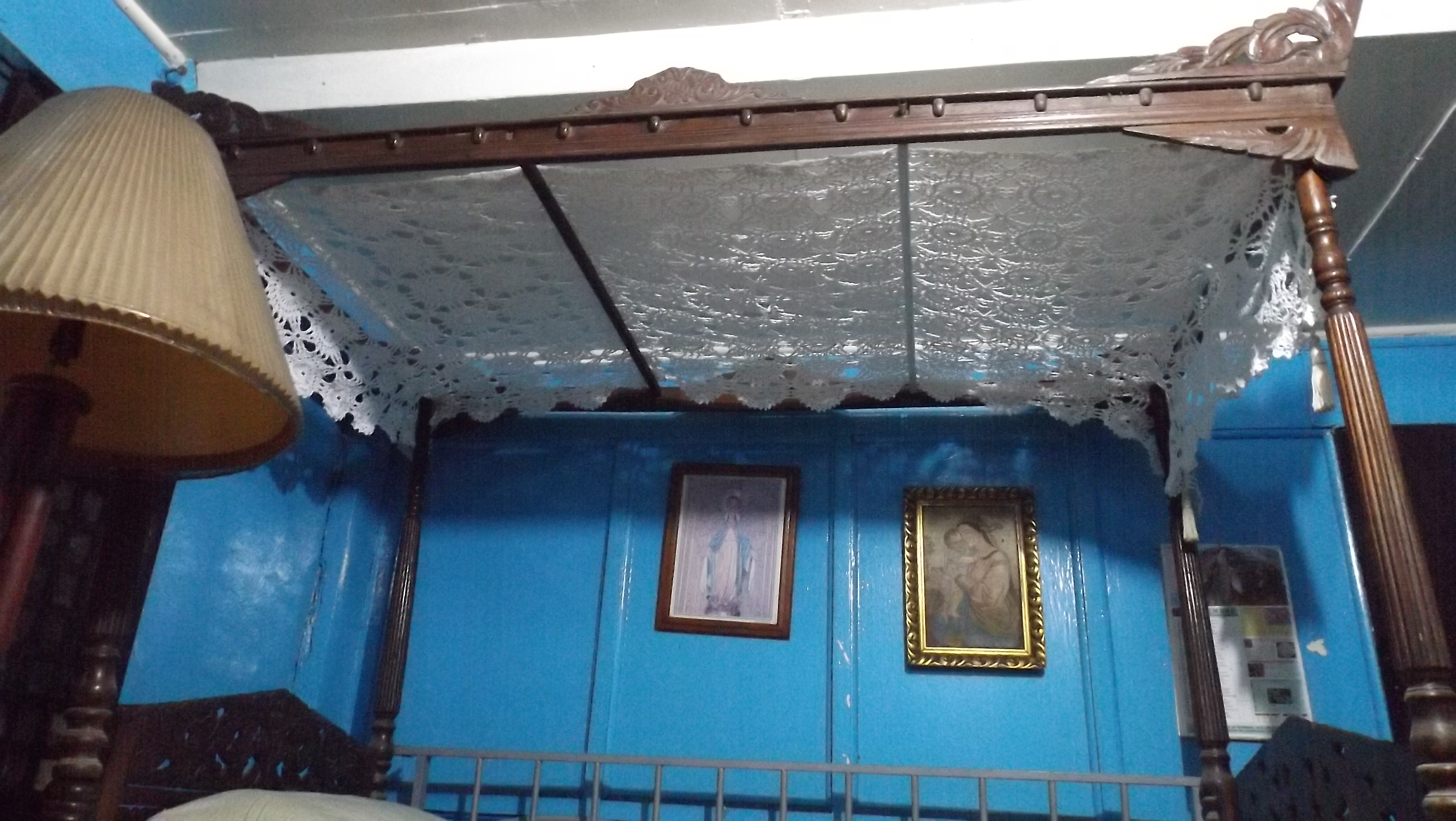
Antique bed
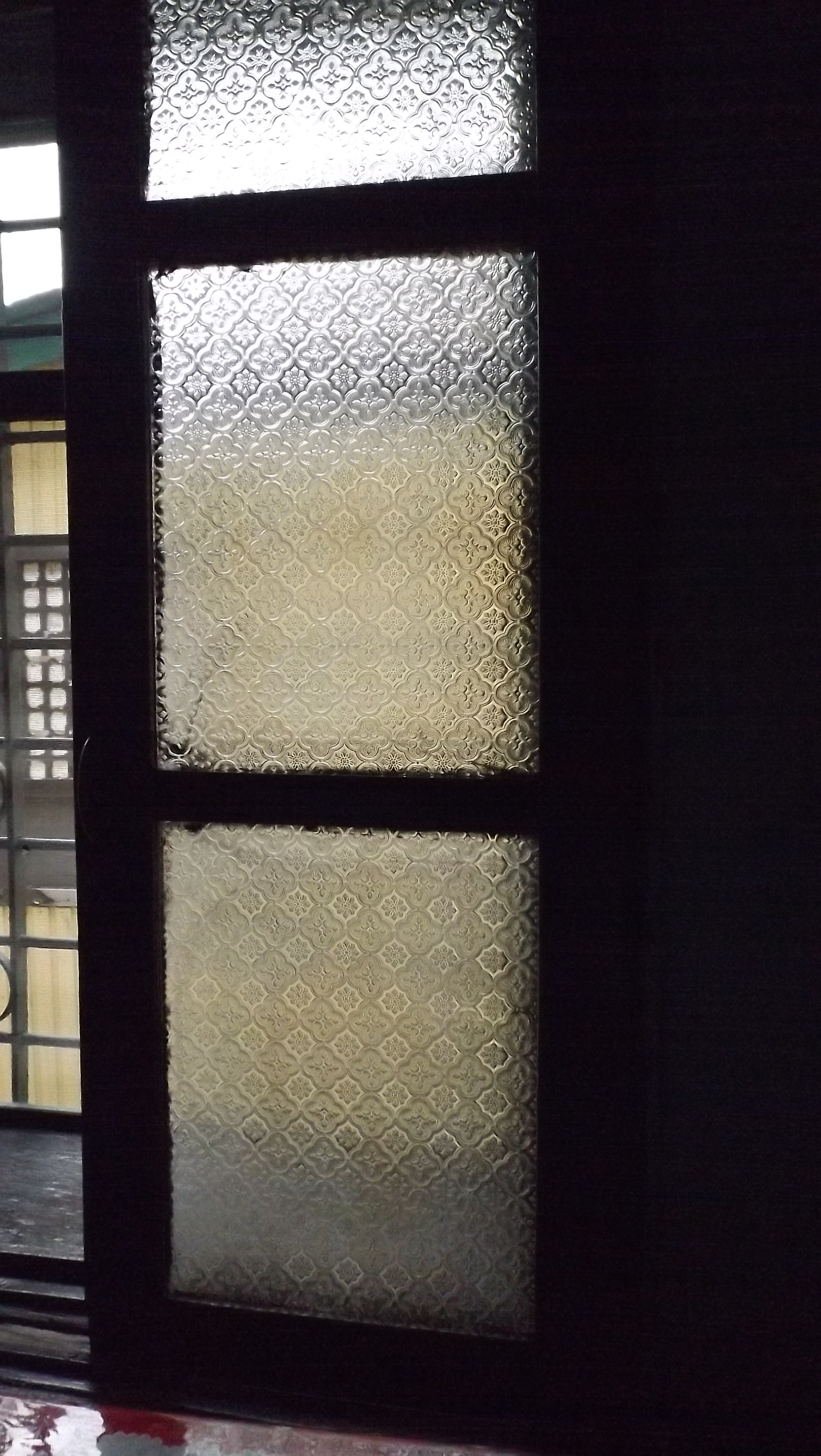
Patterned glass windows at the dining area

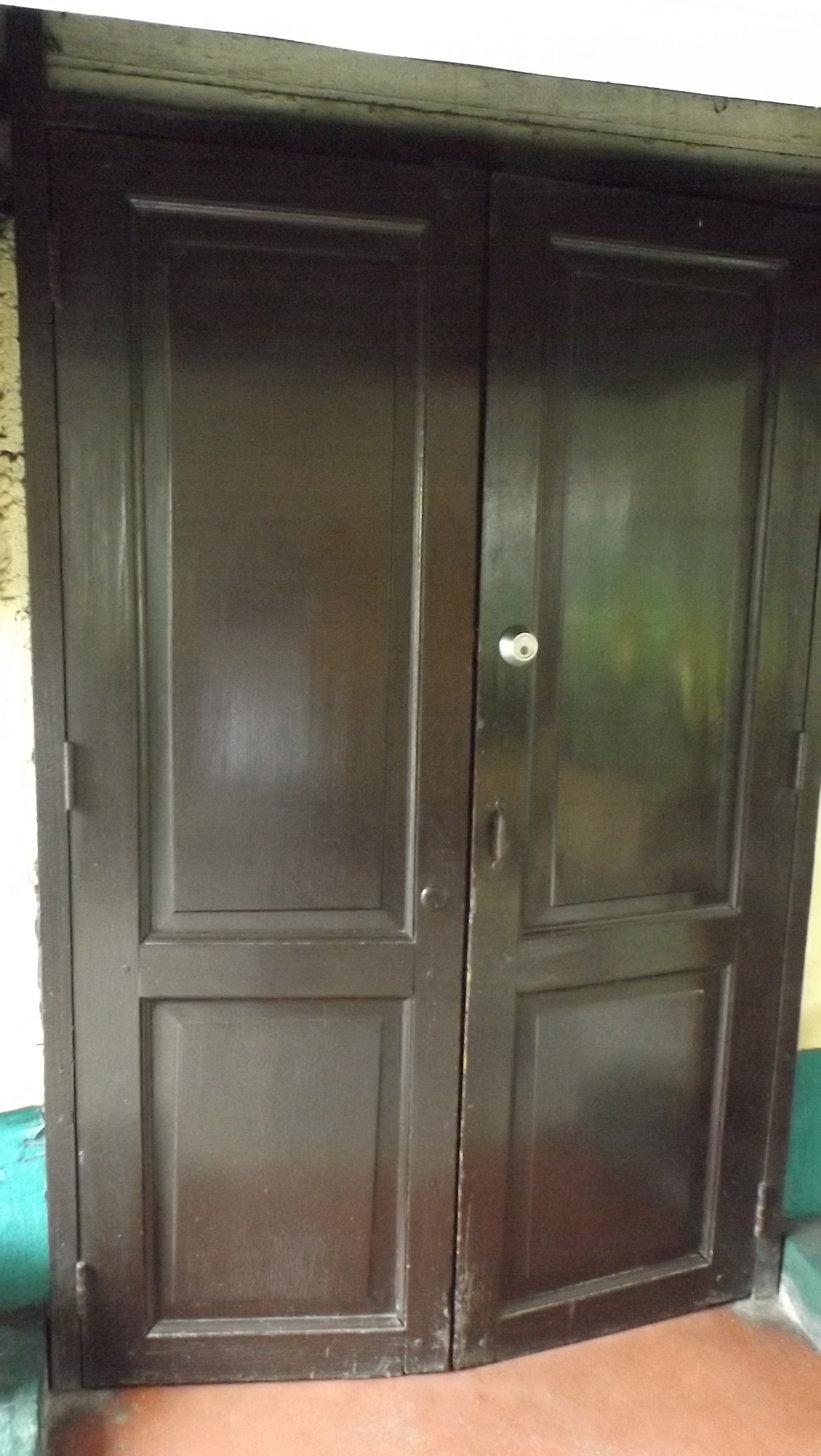
Double slab doors at the mezzanine

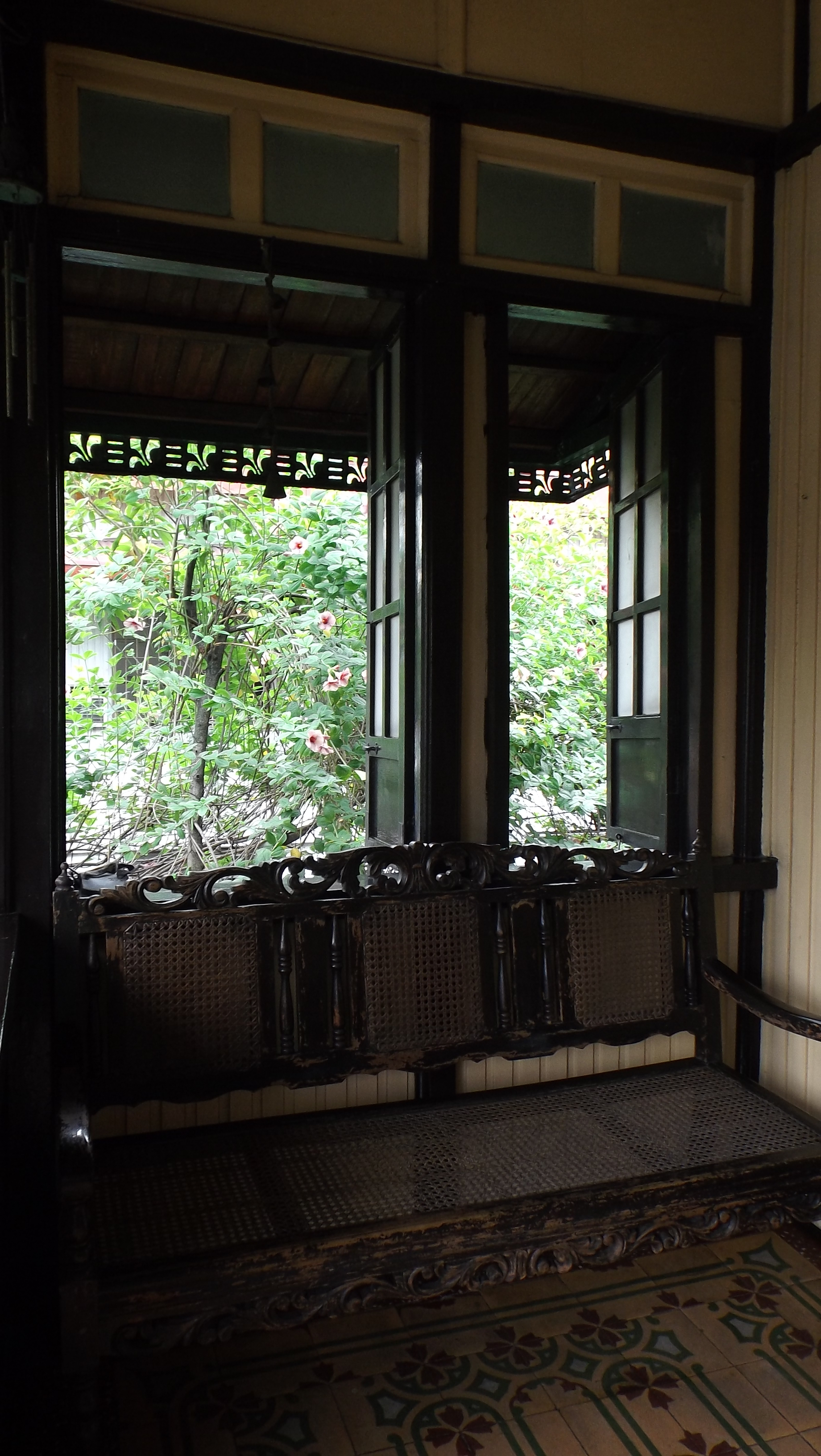
Part of the porch showing the glass transom, canopy, glass windows and antique furniture

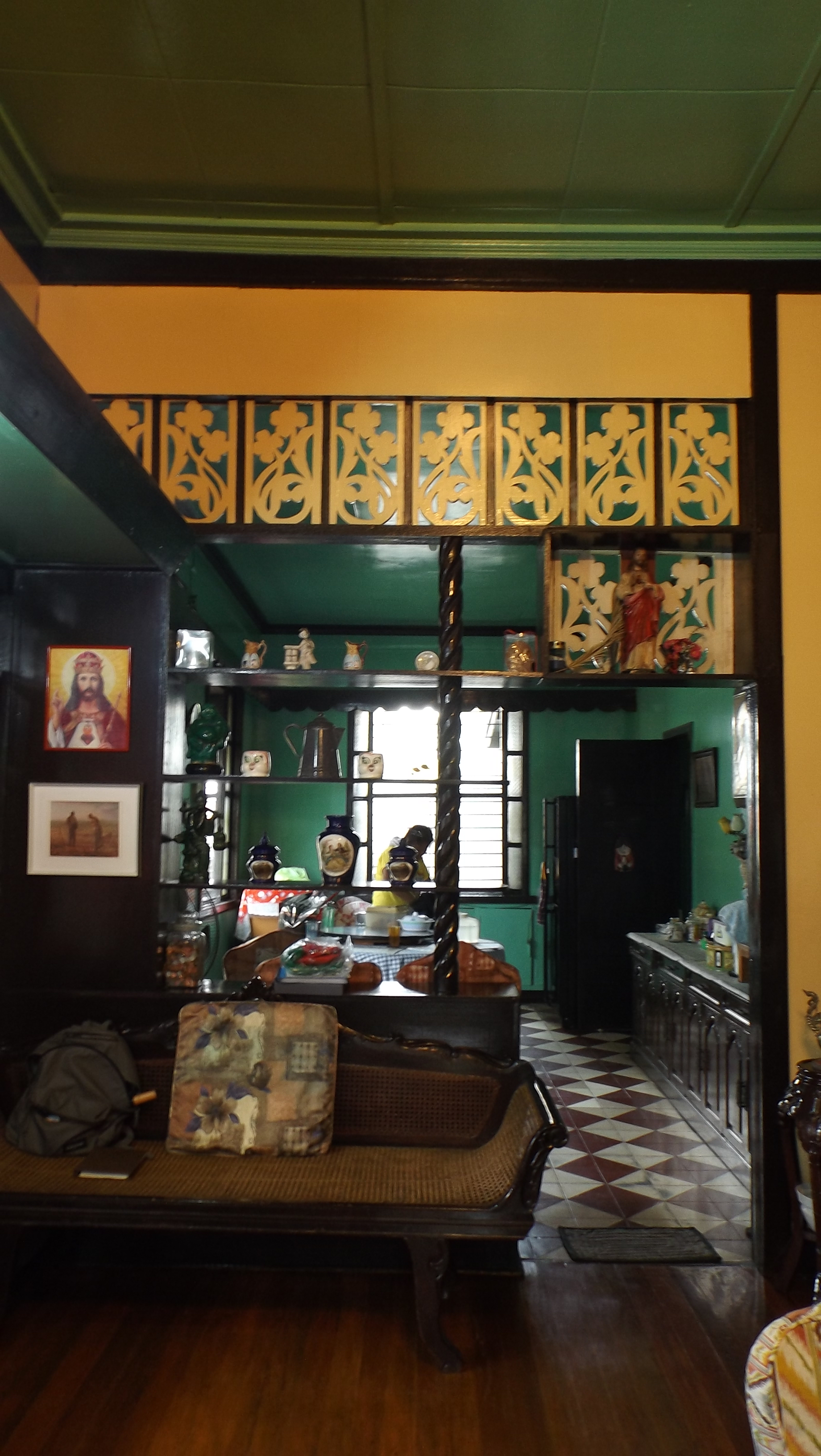
Tracery (calado) transom the divides the receiving area and dining area

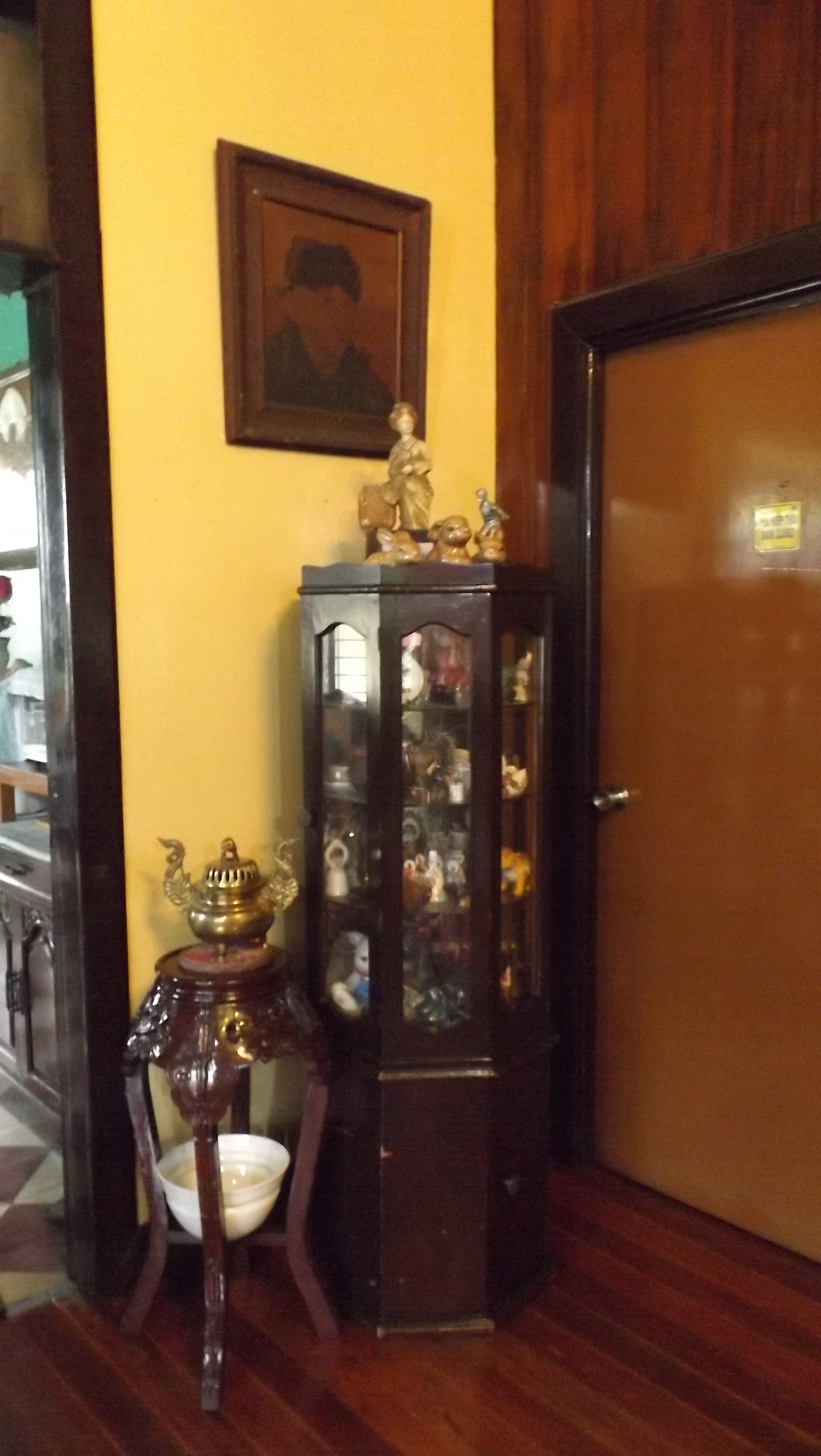
Antique furnishings

== See also ==
- Historic houses in Santa Ana, Manila

== Sources ==
- Francisco, Katerina (November 23, 2013). "Fighting to preserve heritage in Santa Ana, Manila". Rappler.com. Archived from the original on November 10, 2015.
- Haligui (March 7, 2009). "Metro Manila Project, 1571-1961". Haligui.net. The Architectural Heritage of Manila. Archived from the original on November 10, 2015.
- "Metro Manila Project, 1571-1961". Haligui.net. The Architectural Heritage of Manila. April 22, 2009. Archived from the original on November 10, 2015.
