= Historic houses in Santa Ana, Manila =

Santa Ana is the only district in Manila which was spared from destruction during World War II. Civilians fleeing other parts of Manila sought refuge in this district during the war. Thus, many ancestral houses are still standing up to the present time. Dubbed as the "Forbes Park of Manila", some houses were owned by prominent personalities and wealthy families. The following is a list of historic houses in Santa Ana.

== List of historic houses in Santa Ana ==
Declared as a Heritage House by the National Historical Commission of the Philippines

Image	Name	Location	Coordinates
	Amparo-Santos Ancestral House	2324 Isabel Street	14°34′50″N 121°00′50″E
	Areopagita Ancestral House	Lamayan Street	14°34′53″N 121°00′54″E
	Batungbacal Ancestral House	2251 Revellin Street, Brgy. 874 Zone 96	14°34′41″N 121°00′41″E
	Bautista-Rodil Ancestral House	2225A Tejeron Street	14°34′44″N 121°00′28″E
	Bernardo Ancestral House	Isabel Street	14°34′49″N 121°00′49″E
	Cahayon Ancestral House	2421 Leiva Street, Brgy. 873	14°34′48″N 121°00′47″E
	Cobangbang Ancestral House	2289 Syquia Street	14°34′43″N 121°00′35″E
	Cojuangco-Ocampo Ancestral House	Lamayan Street	14°34′59″N 121°01′05″E
	De la Merced - Panis Ancestral House	Plaza Hugo	14°34′52″N 121°00′49″E
	Fernandez Ancestral House	2254 Revellin Street, Brgy. 874 Zone 96	14°34′40″N 121°00′42″E
	Gawat Residential House	2307 Medel Street	14°34′48″N 121°00′39″E
	Leiva-Syquia Ancestral House	2411 Leiva Street, Brgy. 873	14°34′47″N 121°00′46″E
	Lichauco Heritage House	2315 Pedro Gil Street	14°34′53″N 121°00′39″E
	Morales Ancestral House	2233 Dela Rosa Street.	14°34′41″N 121°00′39″E
	Nerecina Ancestral House	Old Panaderos Street corner Embarcadero Street	14°34′57″N 121°00′48″E
	Pascual Modernist House	2138 Dr. M.L. Carreon Street	14°34′52″N 121°00′26″E
	Perez Ancestral House	Plaza Hugo	14°34′53″N 121°00′49″E
	San Juan Ancestral House	Patino Street	14°35′00″N 121°00′47″E
	Santaromana Ancestral House	Plaza Hugo	

=== Amparo-Santos Ancestral House ===
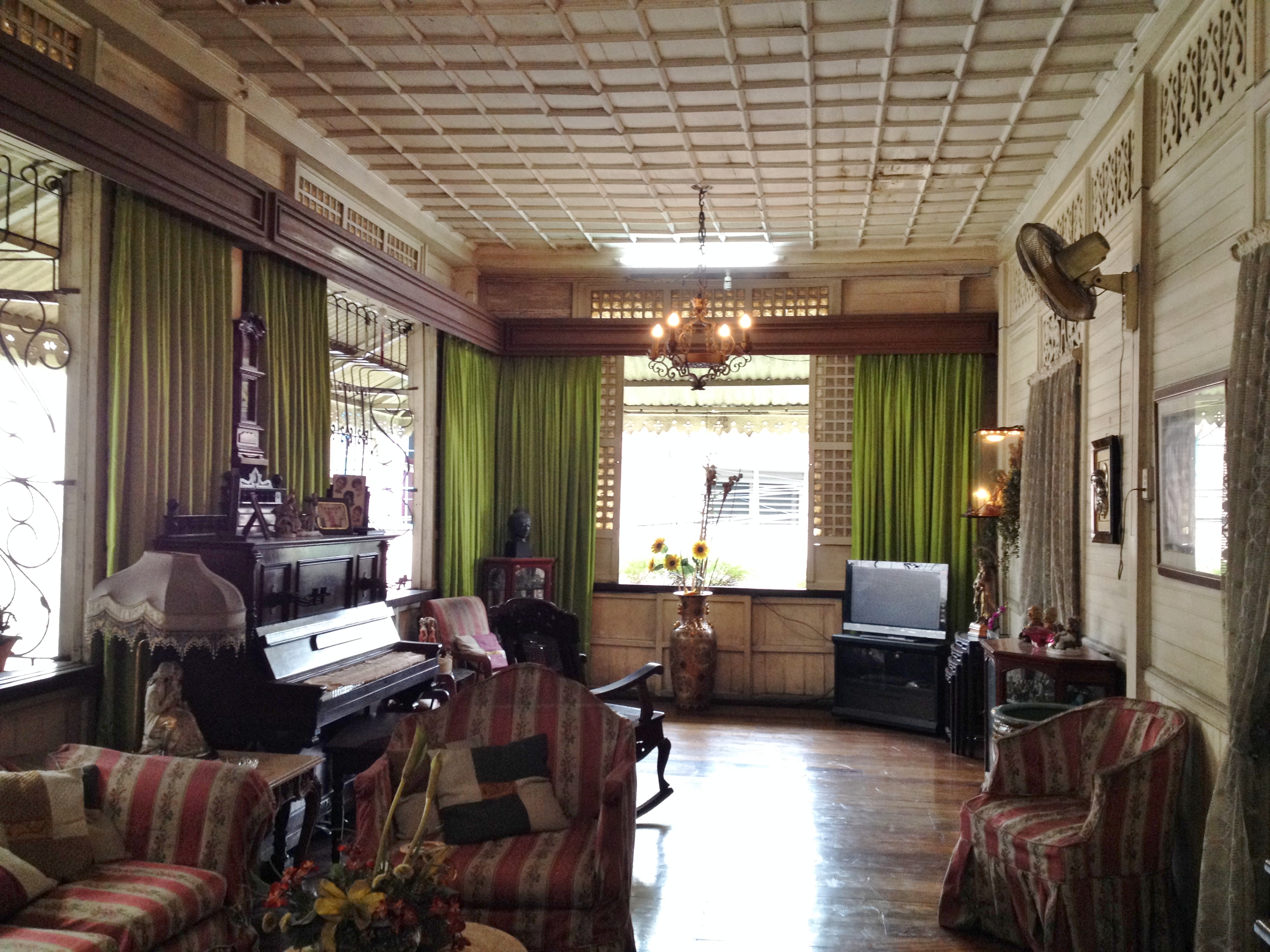
View from the sala

The Amparo-Santos House was built around 1931–1932, along Isabel Street. The original owners of the house were Amparo Lucero, who became Miss Cebu in 1907, and Valentin Santos Sr., who was the first Filipino manager of Manila Electric Company or Meralco. One of the famous personalities related to the Santos family was Jon Santos, a Filipino comedian and total entertainer.

Letter "A" carvings were eminent within the house, specifically at the entrance porch and into the doorways of each bedrooms inside the living room. Circular amulets of St. Benedict could also be noticed at each doors, windows, and eaves of the house. The house was 2nd Transition, Post 1860s, Bahay na Bato, wherein the ground floor was made out of masonry, second floor was made out of wood, and the roofing is in galvanizes iron sheet, with very thick gauge.

=== Areopagita Ancestral House ===
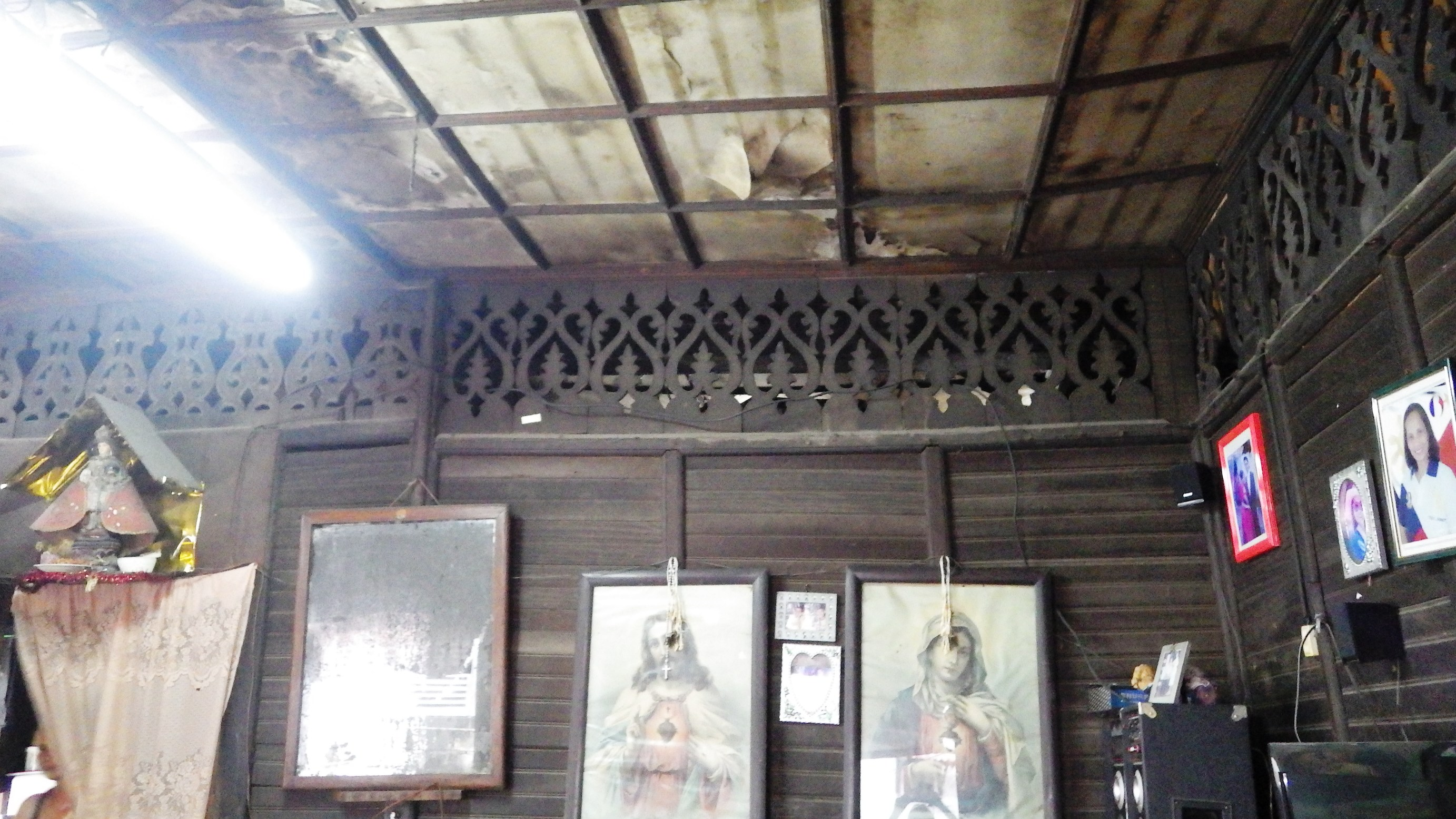
Interior of Areopagita Ancestral House

The Areopagita Residence was built by Leopoldo Areopagita during the early 1900s. Built in the typical bahay na bato fashion, the house has survived the war and a fire. It retained its original wooden windows with capiz shells, as well as the wooden carvings in the interiors. Original large wooden planks with wooden pegs remained intact as flooring in the dining room. Galvanized iron sheets form the roof. The lower exterior of the house is covered with linoleum with brick designs.

=== Batungbacal Ancestral House ===
Across the Fernandez Ancestral House is the mission-style Batungbacal Ancestral House built in the 1930s.

=== Rodil-Bautista Ancestral House ===
Built in 1932, the Rodil-Bautista Residence's original design is reminiscent to a typical bahay na bato elevated flooring in which the original owners used to keep their livestock at the silong or the lower portion of the house. However, the house has undergone a drastic change in the 1960s (as shown in the picture) by having a concrete foundation to accommodate the growing Bautista family. Its owner was Maria Esperanza Rodil-Bautista whose husband, Feliciano Magsalin Bautista, a medical surgeon from Santa Ana was acclaimed to be one of the first 100 licensed physicians in the country after the Physician Licensure Exam was introduced in the Philippines by our American colonizers during the early 1900s. He later practiced his profession in his hometown of Santa Ana in the 1920s until his demise in 1929. In the present time, the house is being maintained by Feliciano and Maria's grandchildren as heritage house to keep the rich memory of the past alive in their hearts and descendants. The house has retained most of its original materials and furniture because of the family's desire to retain its pre-war history. Prior to its first renovation in the 1960s, its most striking features are the arch-shaped arcade situated at the facade, its style borrowing heavily from Mission-styled house common during the Commonwealth period. It is also characterized by ornamental eaves of each of the house's window. In its early years, the house is raised on stilts with a hallowed space under it. Two decades later, the house was extended to the right side and the original silong became a habitable part of the house. It is located inside a compound at the Tejeron Street in Santa Ana. Another renovation started in 2017 as Feliciano and Maria's grandchildren try to bring back the splendor of the Rodil-Bautista ancestral home.

=== Bernardo Ancestral House ===
The Bernardo House was originally built in 1928 along Isabel Street. The two-storey house underwent series of restoration works. This could be observed with the replacement of capiz windows into colored glass, re-painting works, and re-assessment of wooden structural members. At present, the house was converted as one of the main amenities of the events place, Jardin de Isabel. Auxiliary facilities were added such as bahay-kubo-inspired club house and covered car park.

=== Cahayon Ancestral House ===
The Cahayon – Lopez Ancestral House is an American-era ancestral house built in 1937. Much of the two-storey structure, with its furniture, is still intact save for some windows on the first level that were replaced with jalousie windows.

=== Cobangbang Ancestral House ===
Another prewar structure in the district is the house built by Aurelio Cobangbang on Syquia Street is the Cobangbang Ancestral House. The two-storey ancestral house was spared from destruction during World War II.

=== Cojuangco-Ocampo Ancestral House ===
Built around the 1930s, the house used to be owned by Eduardo Cojuangco Sr. and his wife, Josephine Murphy. The property was eventually bought by the family of Pablo V. Ocampo, who served as councilor and representative of the old Fourth Legislative District of Manila and a grandson of Pablo de Leon Ocampo, who was a member of the Malolos Congress. It currently serves as residence of the representative of Manila's Sixth Legislative District Rosenda Ann Ocampo, the daughter of Pablo V. Ocampo.

The house features a vast garden at the back of the structure which includes a gazebo facing the Pasig River. It is one of the few surviving Santa Ana structures found along the river.

=== De la Merced - Panis Ancestral House ===
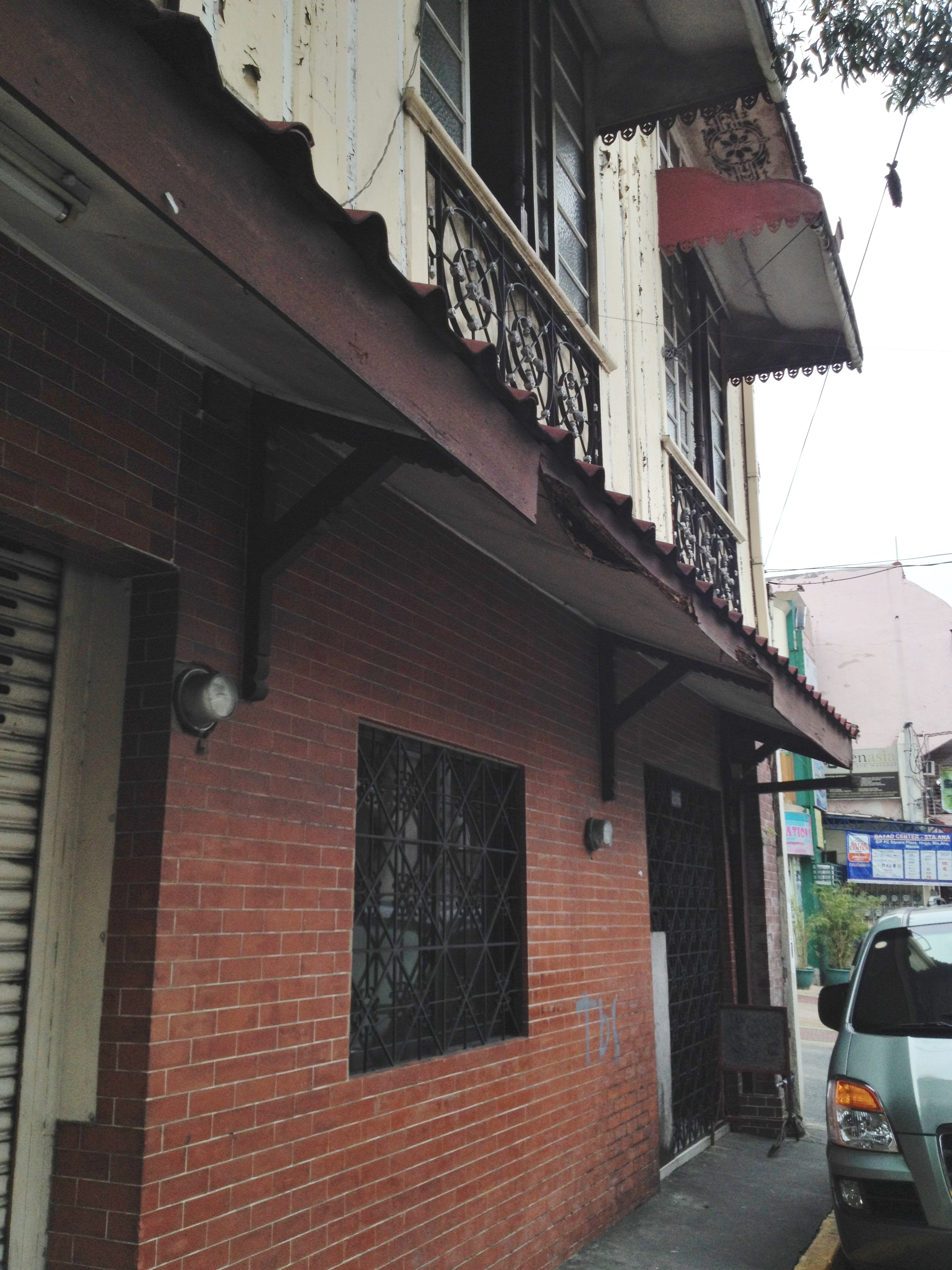
View of the De la Merced-Panis Ancestral house

The De la Merced - Panis House resembles the architectural style of Perez House because of its near proximity to Santa Ana Church and Plaza Hugo. It was built during the 1920s. The present owner of the house was a relative of Ernest Panis, one of the members of Santa Ana Heritage Tourism Association (SAHTA).

Just like the Perez House, it served as an apartment-type house. It utilized its ground floor as a commercial space before, and its second floor as a residential space. Compared to the Perez House, its original features remained intact, including its ventanillas' iron works, galvanized iron canopy roofing along each window accentuated with concave designs, and carvings at the eaves which also serves as openings for efficient cross-ventilation within the house.

=== Fernandez Ancestral House ===
The Fernandez House, along Revellin street, was built sometime between the 1890s to the 1900s. The two-storey house is undergoing renovations. The house, reminiscent of a typical bahay na bato in the Philippines, has a first level of wood and bricks and a wooden second floor. Another noteworthy feature of the house is its original piedra china pavement on its driveway.

=== Garzon - Diaz De Rivera Ancestral House ===
The Diaz De Rivera House was demolished. It was right next to the then St Anne Academy along Pedro Gil.

The Diaz de Rivera family is a prominent Filipino family known for their contributions to the arts, culture, and heritage conservation in the Philippines. They have a long and storied history in Santa Ana, Manila, where they own several ancestral homes and properties.

The Diaz de Rivera family is descended from Don Jose Diaz de Rivera, who served as the governor of the Province of Bulacan during the Spanish colonial period. The family's ancestral home in Santa Ana, known as the Casa Blanca, was built in the 1800s and has been preserved as a cultural landmark.

In addition to their contributions to heritage conservation, the Diaz de Rivera family has also been active in the arts and culture scene in the Philippines. Several members of the family have pursued careers in music, theater, and the visual arts.

The family is also known for their philanthropic work. They have supported various charitable causes and organizations over the years, including those that promote education and the arts.

Today, the Diaz de Rivera family continues to be an important part of the cultural and social fabric of Santa Ana, Manila, and the wider Philippines. They have made significant contributions to the development and preservation of the district's heritage and cultural legacy.

=== Gawat Residential House ===
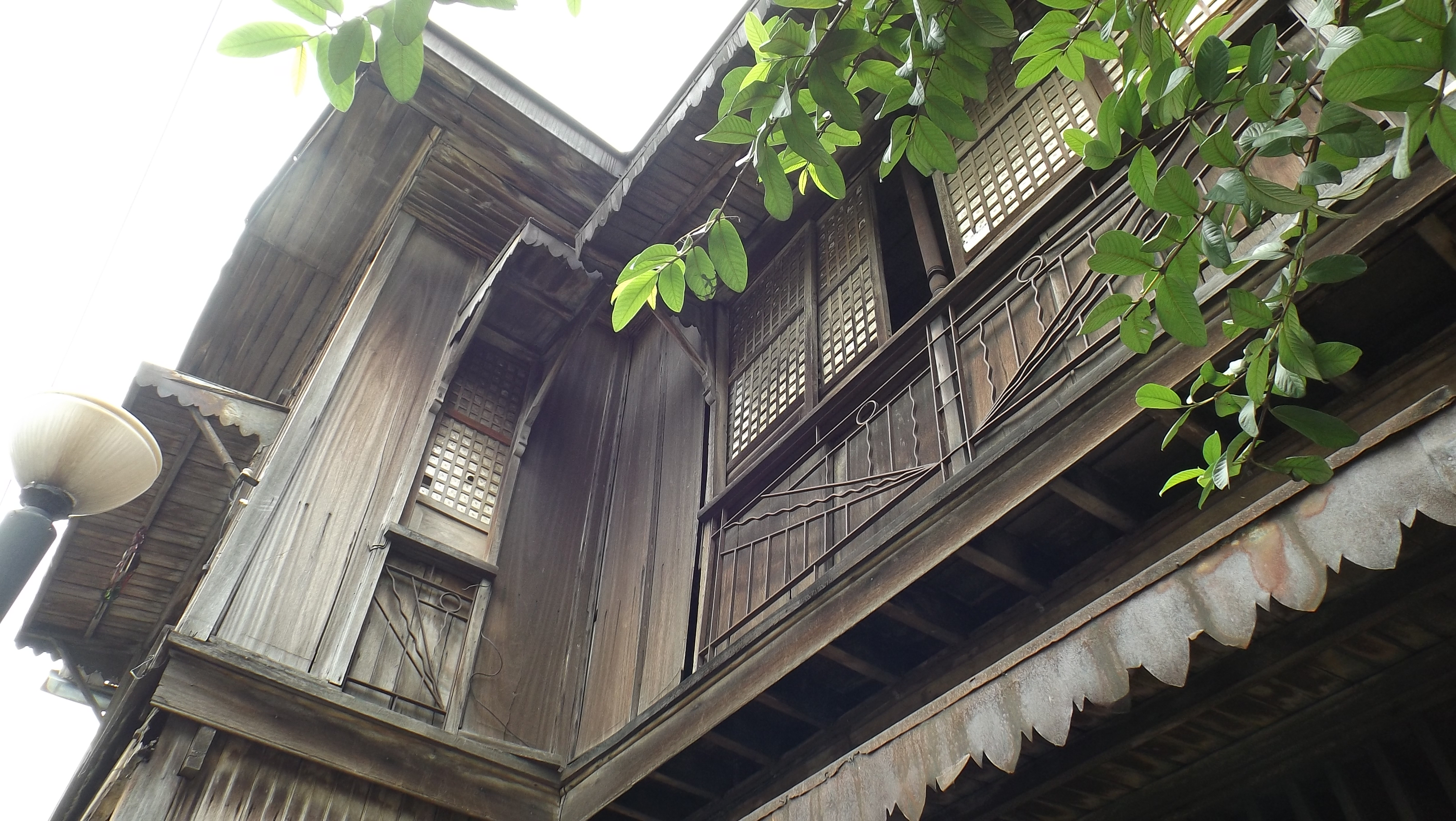
A closer look at the windows and canopies of Gawat Residential House

This two-storey villa was constructed in 1923 after Andres Gawat, a police captain, won in a lottery. It is located at 2307 Medel Street. The house is characterized by having a plain exterior, exhibiting walls made of hardwood and the traditional sliding capiz windows with iron grills. Board panels around the house were arranged vertically and horizontally. Repairs have been made to the walls to replace decayed panels. Galvanized iron sheets were utilized as main roof and canopies. Poured concrete was used on the floor on the first storey while hardwood board panels were installed on the floor on the second storey of the house.

=== Leiva-Syquia Ancestral House ===
A few steps away from the Cahayon Ancestral House is the Leiva-Syquia Ancestral House built also in the 1930s. The two-level house of the Syquia family, according to oral history, used to house the clinic of Dr. Pio Valenzuela while on his stay at Santa Ana, Manila. The house was occupied by the Agham Theater Company sometime in the 1990s before moving their headquarters to the University of Makati. Significant renovations were done by Engr. Solomon A. Provido and his wife Ethelina Provido (née Mendoza) who occupied the home with their family in the late 1990s to early 2000s. This included rehabilitation of two kitchens, three bathrooms, and addition of upstairs and downstairs bedrooms. The exterior of the house was kept as close as possible to original to pay respect to the home's history. Roof and gates were painted green as this is the family's lucky color.

=== Lichauco Heritage House ===
The Lichauco Heritage House is one of the surviving old house structures located along Pedro Gil Street. Built around the mid-19th century, its general structure reflects the architectural style of houses common during the Spanish Colonial period. On July 10, 2010, by virtue of the National Historical Commission of the Philippines (then National Historical Institute) Resolution No. 5, the Lichauco House was declared a Heritage House, the first to receive such distinction in Santa Ana.

=== Morales Ancestral House ===
This chalet-type house was built in 1932. Unlike any other houses, the facade has a striking appearance, showing its walls and pediment with geometric designs. A variety of windows can be seen. There is a glass-on-wood sliding frame window, a ventanilla with wood sliding panels and iron grills, and a window with diagonal iron window grills on the facade with the "GM" initials. There is also a capiz-shell window and one with iron window grills on the lateral part of the house. Its exterior walls are made of wood panels on the front and horizontal clapboards on the sides. The house is located at 2233 Dela Rosa Street.

=== Nerecina Ancestral House ===
The Nerecina Ancestral House is located in Old Panaderos Street corner Embarcadero Street. Built in 1930 by Julio G. Nerecina, MD, the house is a mixture of masonry and wood following the typical bahay-na-bato fashion of the American Period houses. Notable features of the exterior are the staircase of adobe stones and its veranda. The house has a plain exterior, showing walls made of masonry and hardwood on its first and second levels respectively and the traditional sliding capiz-shell windows with ventanillas and iron grills.

=== Pascual Modernist House ===
The Pascual House is located in 2138 Dr. M.L. Carreon Street. Like a number of older prominent houses in the district, this 3-storey structure enjoys the view of the nearby Pasig River which is located on the east, as well as the Estero de Pandacan farther up on the northeast. These riverside houses have verandas and wide opening to frame the river views as well as catch the breeze.

The Pascual House is a modernist style house built in April 1948, using a mixture of reinforced concrete, masonry and wood. A notable feature of the exterior are the three reinforced concrete pylons on the façade of the house. The mirador or watchtower is also a notable feature of the exterior that adorns the corner mass of the whole house. Vertical and horizontal design elements complement the whole massing of the house. On the interiors, notable features are the built-in cabinetry, niches and the cove ceilings. All are in stylized geometric form. Granolithic flooring can still be found on the first three steps of the stairs and main entrance steps. The whole ground floor is covered in “Machuca” tiles. On the second floor, geometric stylized ventilation panels with the initials of the original owner (V) embellish the wall partitions. Plumbing fixtures are all original from the 1940s.

Originally the house was owned by Mr. Jose Velo, the house is occupied by its second owner Engr. Rodolfo C. Pascual who bought the property in 1984. According to its present owner, the house was sometimes used as a location for some movies during the 1950s and has managed to survive even as many neighboring older structures, mostly vacation houses built in other architectural styles, eventually decayed through the years and are now being demolished to give way to modern developments.

=== Perez Ancestral House ===
The Perez House is a two-storey apartment-type structure, built between 1931 and 1932 located in Plaza Hugo. It was originally owned by Jaime S. Perez, an en kargador or tax collector during the pre-war. It is within near proximity to the Santa Ana Church and Plaza Hugo, the former center of main activity in Santa Ana, Manila. The ground floor was utilized before as a commercial space, exhibiting ecclesiastical sculptures and art. The second floor was utilized as a residential space for owner/s and bed spacers. At present, the ground floor was still used as a commercial space (sari-sari store) while the second floor was converted into one-room bedroom. This utilization of spaces was an example of adaptive re-use, least option in Heritage Conservation.

=== San Juan Ancestral House ===
The San Juan Ancestral House is one of the old structures located along Patino Street. Constructed in 1937, the two-story wood-and-stone house became the home of the San Juan Clan after Pablo San Juan, Sr and his wife got married. One can hardly notice this old house because of a big Alagao Tree that stands in front of its facade. Generally, most of the components of the house were kept untouched from renovation. However, several portions of the back part of the house were damaged by a fire that occurred on December 23, 2006. These remained unrepaired up to this day.

=== Santaromana Ancestral House ===
The Santaromana House was built at around 1920s along the Plaza Hugo. It gained recognition before as a famous bakery within Santa Ana, Manila. At present, the ground floor was still used as a bakery while the second floor was used as a residential space.

== See also ==
- Santa Ana Church (Manila)
- Santa Ana Heritage Zone
- Heritage houses of the Philippines
