= Lichauco Heritage House =

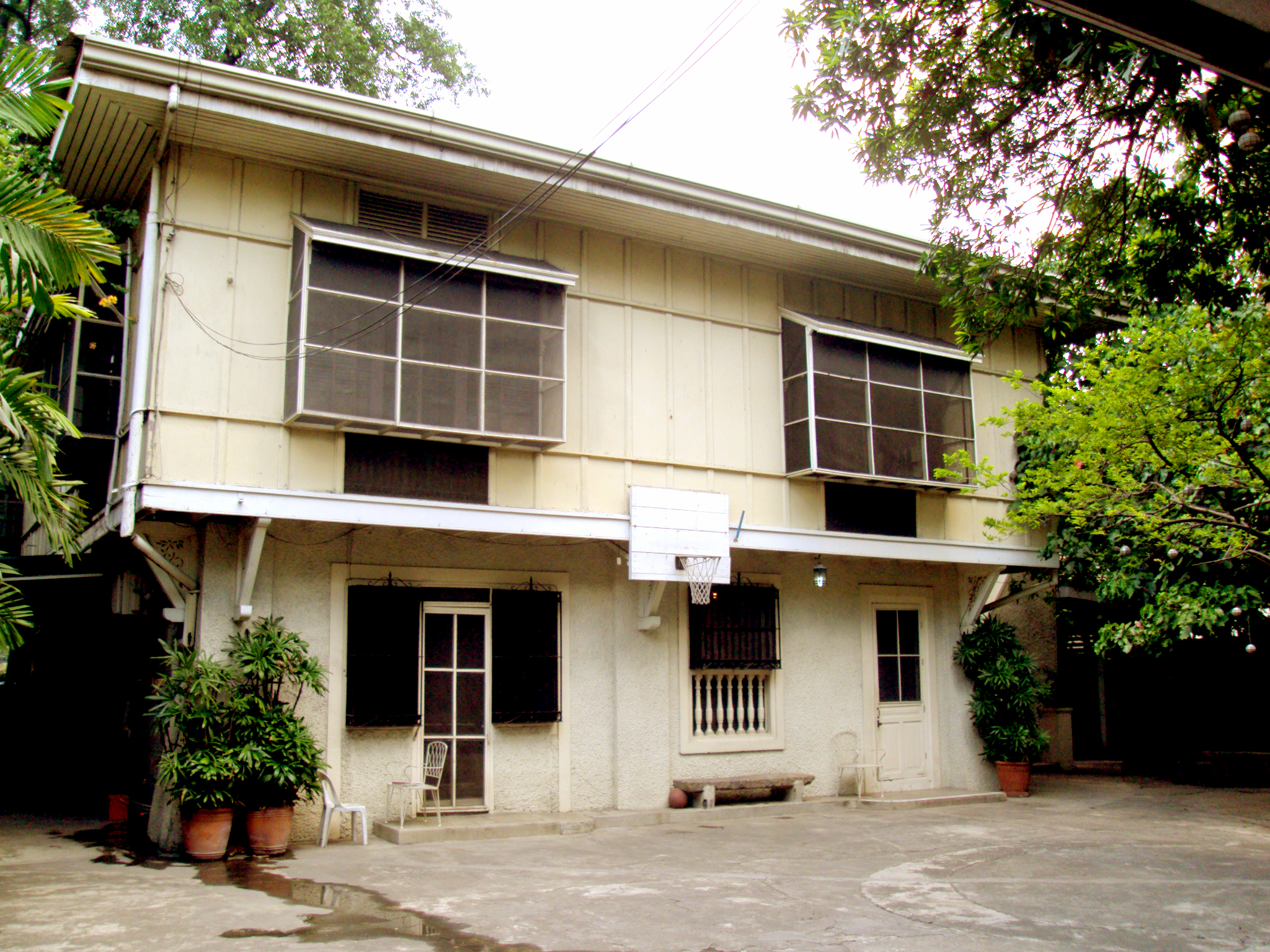
- The Lichauco Heritage House in Santa Ana facing Pedro Gil Street

- Location within Metro Manila

General information
- Type: Residential House
- Architectural style: Bahay na Bato
- Location: 2315 Pedro Gil Street, Santa Ana, Manila, Philippines
- Coordinates: 14.5815°N 121.0109°E
- Owner: Lichauco Family

Technical details
- Material: Stones, Bricks, and Wood

The Lichauco Heritage House, formally known as the O'Brien-Lichauco Heritage House is one of the oldest surviving houses in Santa Ana, Manila, Philippines. The house was purchased in the late 1940s by a prominent Filipino lawyer and dignitary, Marcial Lichauco from a European family who had fled the Japanese occupation in the Philippines. The house was declared as a heritage house by the National Historical Commission on July 10, 2010. The Lichauco Heritage house is located along Pedro Gil Street. It is the only declared Heritage House in Santa Ana, and one of the only two declared heritage houses in Metro Manila along with Mira-Nila House in Quezon City.

== History ==
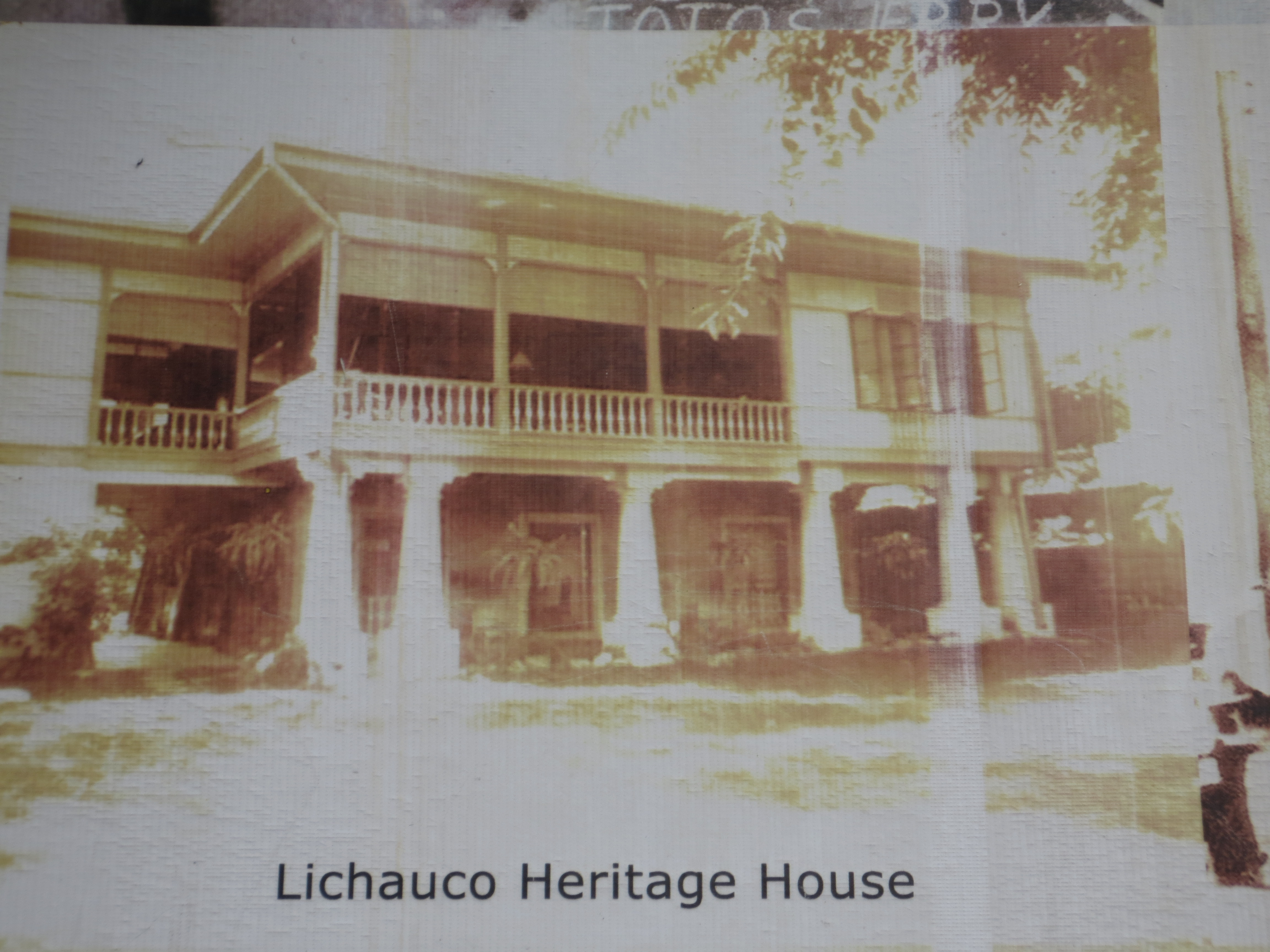
An old picture of the Lichauco Heritage House taken prior to extensive postwar reconstruction.

Although the house has undergone significant postware renovation, initial surveys of the house suggest that at least some parts may have been constructed during the 1850-1860s during the late Spanish period. However, only a small fraction of the original construction remains. It was deliberately constructed facing the Pasig River because at the time, the river was an avenue for a flourishing market and a major transport route for visitors travelling in Manila.

Prior to World War II, the house was owned by the O'Brien family who fled Manila when Japanese troops invaded the capital. Unlike the other towns in Manila, Santa Ana was spared from much of the destruction.

It was at one time believed that the house became a place of refuge for those fleeing the destruction downtown. However, this theory has been debunked. According to "Dear Mother Putnam," a war diary published by Marcial P. Lichauco, the property owner, the place of refuge was in fact closer to Santa Ana church on the opposite side of the street.

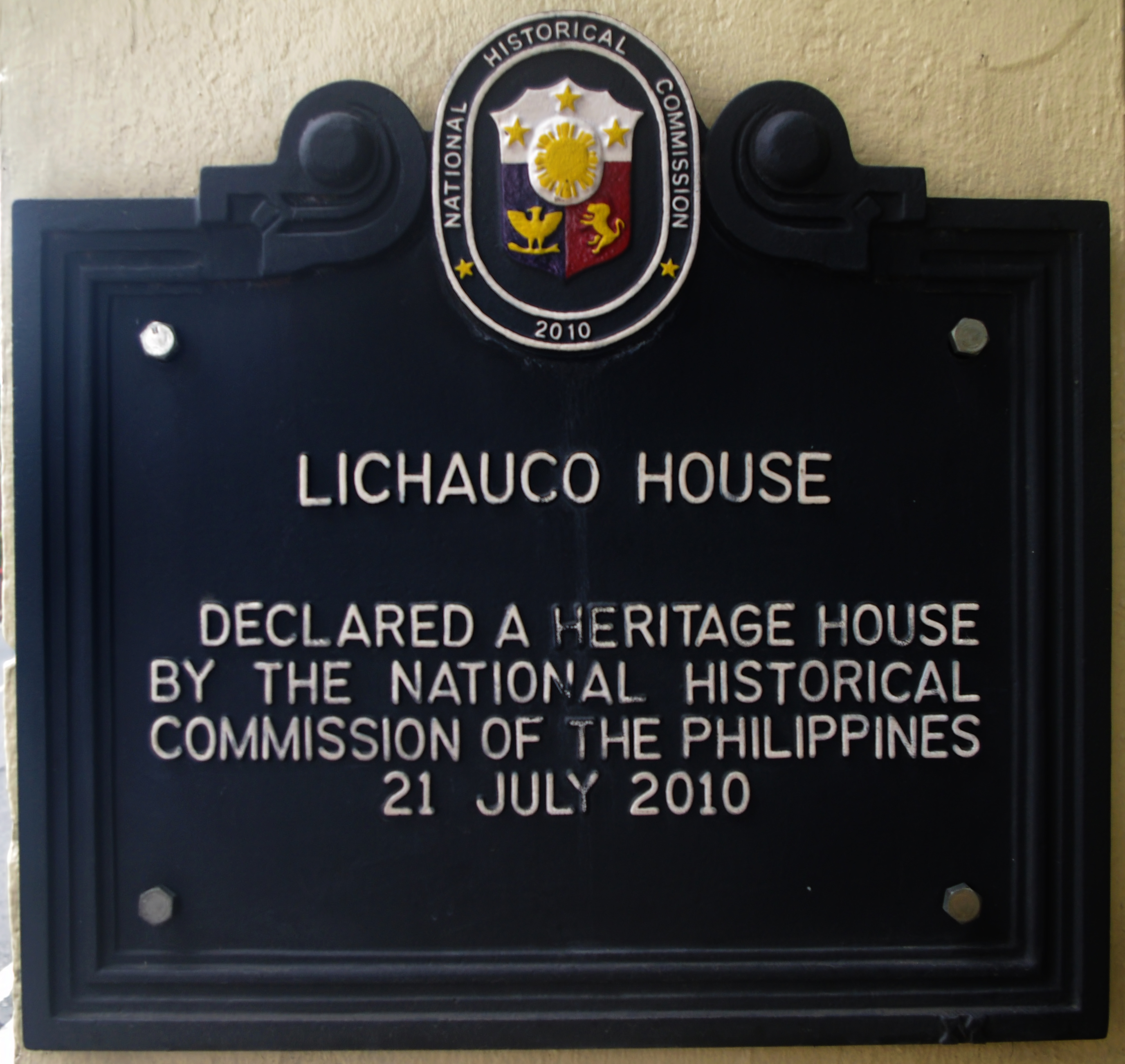
Historical marker declaring the residence as a Heritage House in 2010

Following the Allied liberation of Manila, Marcial Lichauco bought the house from the O'Briens. In recent years, the house has become an important remnant of Santa Ana's rich history when at June 10, 2010, it was declared to be the first heritage house by the virtue of Resolution 5 by the National Historical Commission.

== Architecture and style ==
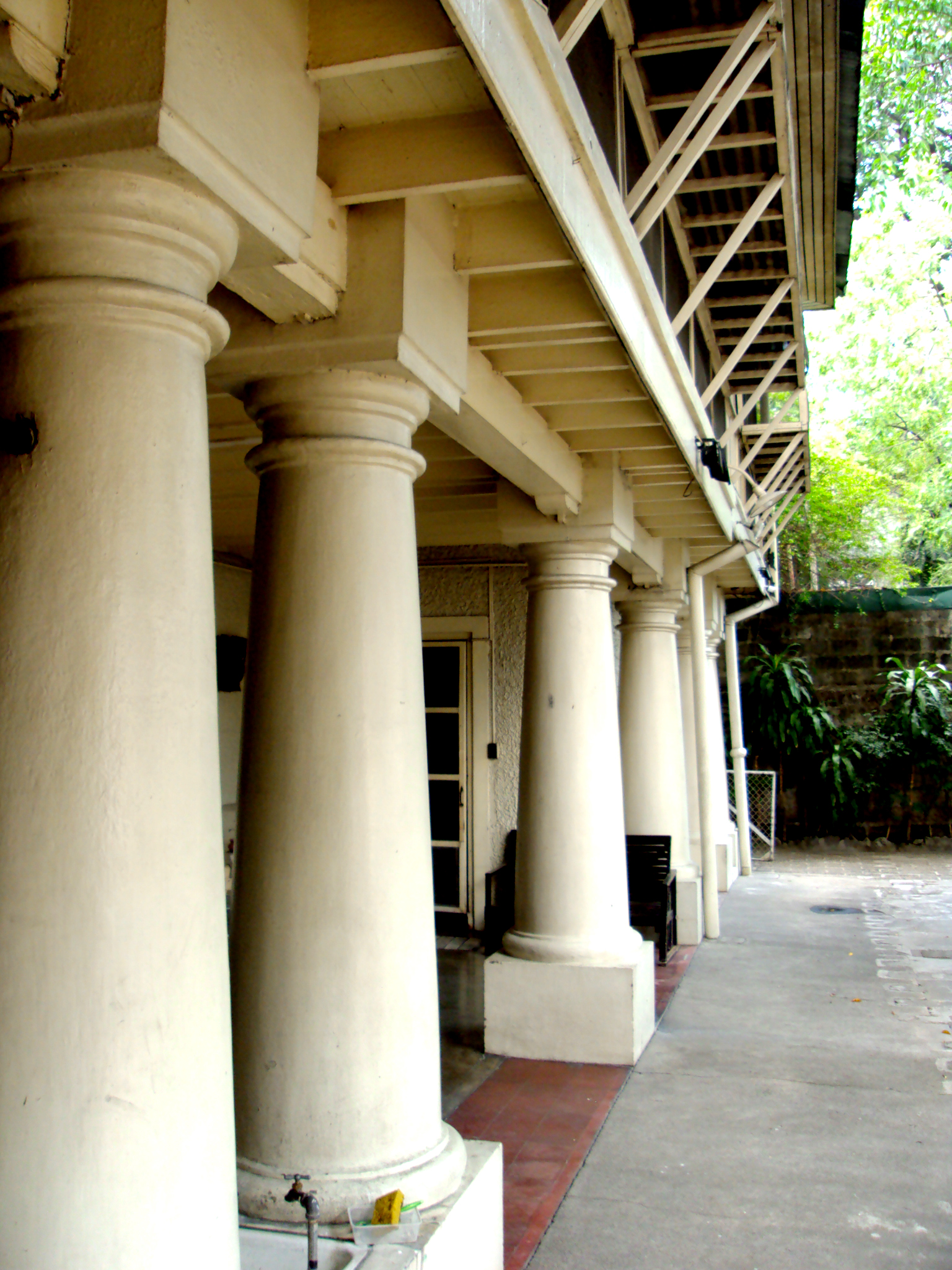
The Tuscan columns of the Lichauco Heritage House in Santa Ana facing Pasig River

In a style reminiscent of the Bahay na Bato of pre-1860s heavily influenced by Spanish-style architecture, concrete materials are used on the ground floor, varnished wood on the second floor, and capiz for windows and other decorations. As a result of extensive postwar renovations and repairs, the house retains only a small fraction of its original materials and architecture. All that remains are the molave stairs, the adobe walls, some wooden panels, and one small bedroom that features the original machuca tiles. In other rooms, the original machuca tiles have been replaced with a simpler checkerboard pattern common during the postwar renovation. Much of the original varnished wood flooring on has been replaced by parquet tiles. The house features a spacious second floor to accommodate social gatherings. The second floor been separated from a no-longer extant outdoor veranda by sliding doors to permit air conditioning. A row of thick, plaster-coated Tuscan columns supports the veranda on the side facing the Pasig River. The house faces the Pasig River because at the time it was built, most guests arrived by boat. However, the boat landing has been lost and the original river view has been obscured by a dyke. The original open veranda on the side facing the Pasig river has been enclosed with similar box screens. A second floor “Juliet balcony” that originally faced the river was torn down during addition of a new wing in the postwar period. A connecting corridor with steel-framed windows and cantilevered box screens now covers the original second-floor façade. The formerly open east-facing veranda was enclosed to protect the interior against typhoons and to also permit indoor air conditioning. The original river view from this veranda has been blocked as a result of the new wing.

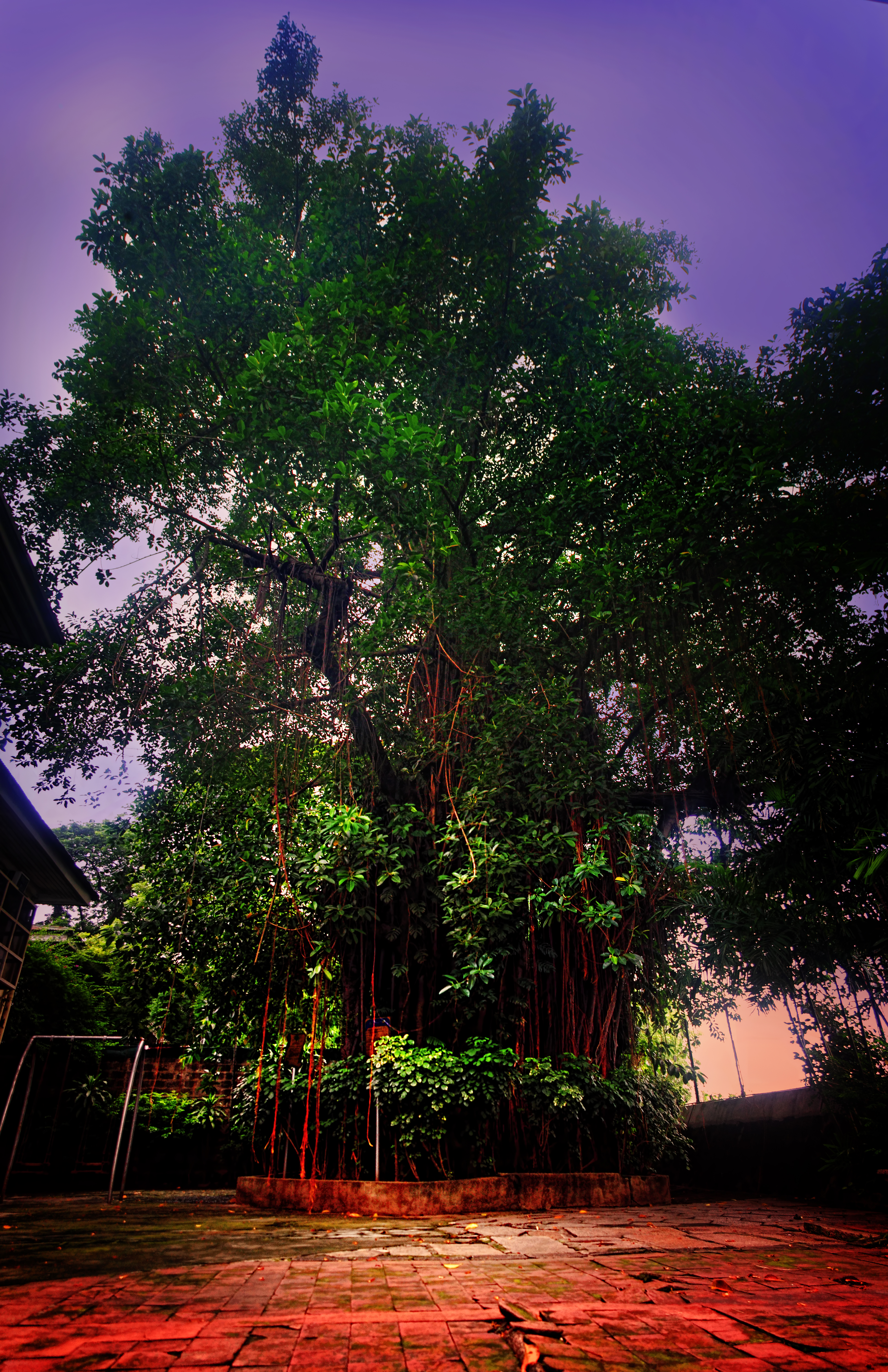
The Banyan (Balete) tree beside the Pasig River, showing the paved surroundings that now prevent vines from taking root and thus impede natural growth. Also visible in the photo is the dike that eliminated the original boat landing.

Standing between the river and the house is a balete tree (strangler fig) of uncertain age. This tree was declared by the Department of Environment and Natural Resources as the second heritage tree within Manila. The Lichauco balete tree is the eighth Heritage Tree proclaimed in Metro Manila, However, it is the first heritage tree to be declared inside a residential compound.

As can be seen in the photo, the original natural surroundings have been paved over, thus preventing the vines from taking root and impeding the tree's natural tendency to expand its footprint.

== Controversy ==
Whether the Lichauco Heritage House meets the requirements for being a "Heritage House" has been called into question for two reasons: (1) the lack of historicity for the occurrence of certain events and (2) the loss of significant original structure due to renovation and repair.

According to a primary source, namely the owner's war diary "Dear Mother Putnam," the house that served as a refuge for those fleeing the Battle of Manila was on the opposite of Herran Street (now Pedro Gil). The Lichauco Heritage House was in fact used by Japanese military personnel who looted it during the Battle of Manila.

In addition, while the house retains a fraction of original material, postwar renovation and reconstruction have arguably reduced that fraction to levels found in many houses that were built in the late Spanish Period.

== See also ==
- Historic houses in Santa Ana, Manila
